= List of people with surname Miller =

Miller is a surname of English, Scottish and Irish origins. The surname may be of German origins when Miller is an anglicization of "Müller}.

== A–C ==
- Aaron Miller (disambiguation), multiple people
- Adam Miller (disambiguation), multiple people
- Addie Dickman Miller (1859–1936), American college professor
- Alan Miller (disambiguation), multiple people
- Alano Miller, American actor
- Alexander Miller (disambiguation), multiple people
- Alexey Miller (born 1962), Russian energy executive officer
- Alice Miller (disambiguation), multiple people
- Ally Miller (disambiguation), multiple people
- Alden H. Miller (1906–1965), American ornithologist
- Amiah Miller (born 2004), American actress
- Amos Miller (c. 1865–1888), lynching victim
- Amy Bess Miller (1912–2003), American historian, preservationist, and civic leader
- Amy Miller (born 1980), Canadian filmmaker
- Andre Miller (born 1976), American basketball player
- Andrew Miller (disambiguation), multiple people
- Anna Miller (disambiguation), multiple people
- Anne Miller (disambiguation), multiple people
- Annie Miller (disambiguation), multiple people
- Anthony Miller (disambiguation), multiple people
- Arjay Miller (1916–2017), president of Ford Motor Company
- Arthur Miller (disambiguation), multiple people
- Aruna Miller (born 1964), American politician from Maryland
- Aubrey Miller (disambiguation), multiple people
- Augustus S. Miller (1847–1905), Mayor of Providence, Rhode Island
- Balin Miller (2002–2025), American climber
- Ben Miller (disambiguation), multiple people
- Benzion Miller (1947–2025), Polish-born American cantor
- Bina West Miller (1867–1954), American businesswoman
- Blake Miller (disambiguation), multiple people
- Bobbie Heine Miller (1909–2016), South African tennis player
- Bodil Miller (1928–2017), Danish actress
- Brad Miller (disambiguation), multiple people
- Brian Miller (disambiguation), multiple people
- Brittney Miller (born 1974), American politician
- Bryce Miller (disambiguation), multiple people
- Buddy Miller (born 1952), American musician
- Burton Miller (1926–1982), American costume designer
- Calvin Miller, Scottish footballer
- Cam Miller (born 2001), American football player
- Campbell Miller (disambiguation), multiple people
- Candice Miller (born 1954), American politician
- Carey D. Miller (1895–1985), American food scientist
- Carlos Miller (disambiguation), multiple people
- Casey Miller (1919–1997), American author
- Casey Miller (KC Montero) (born 1978), Filipino-American radio DJ, VJ and host
- Charles Miller (disambiguation), multiple people
- Catharine Miller (1755–1814), American patriot and plantation owner
- Catherine Miller (born 1991), Trinidadian model
- Cheryl Miller (disambiguation), multiple people
- Christa Miller (born 1964), American actress
- Christen Miller (born 2004), American football player
- Christian Miller (disambiguation), multiple people
- Chris Miller (disambiguation), multiple people
- Claudia S. Miller, author and immunologist
- Cody Miller (disambiguation), multiple people
- Colby Miller (born 1980), American television personality
- Colin Miller (disambiguation), multiple people
- Colleen Miller (disambiguation), multiple people
- Cynthia Miller (disambiguation), multiple people

== D–F ==
- Dan Miller (disambiguation), multiple people
- Daniel Miller (disambiguation), multiple people
- Danny Miller (disambiguation), multiple people
- Dante Miller (born 1999), American football player
- Darius Miller (born 1990), American basketball player
- Darrel R. Miller (1920–2010), American farmer and politician
- Darren Miller (disambiguation), multiple people
- Darrin Miller (born 1965), American football player
- Davey Miller (1893–1959), American country musician
- David Miller (disambiguation), multiple people
- Dayton Miller (1866–1941), American physicist
- Dean Miller (disambiguation), multiple people
- Dennis Miller (disambiguation), multiple people
- Denny Miller (1934–2014), American actor
- Derrick Miller, US Army Sergeant jailed for murder of Afghan civilian
- Dexter Miller, American politician
- Diana Miller (disambiguation), several people
- Dominic Miller, British guitarist (1960–)
- Donald Miller (disambiguation), multiple people
- Dora Richards Miller, (1842–1914), Danish West Indies-born American author and educator
- Doris Miller (disambiguation), multiple people
- Dorothy Miller (disambiguation), multiple people
- Drew Miller (disambiguation), multiple people
- Dustin Miller, American politician
- Dusty Miller (disambiguation), multiple people
- E. Spencer Miller (1817–1879), American Dean of the University of Pennsylvania Law School
- Earl Miller (disambiguation), multiple people
- Edmund Miller (disambiguation), multiple people
- Edward Miller (disambiguation), multiple people
- Edwin Miller (disambiguation), multiple people
- Elizabeth Miller (disambiguation), multiple people
- Ellis Miller (born 2002), British slalom canoeist
- Elva Ruby Miller (1907–1997), American singer
- Eric Miller (disambiguation), multiple people
- Esther Miller (born 1957), Canadian cross-country skier
- Euan Miller (1897–1985), British Army General
- Eugene Miller (disambiguation), multiple people
- Eve Miller (1923–1973), American actress
- Evgenii Karlovich Miller (1867–1939), Russian general
- Flournoy E. Miller (1887–1971), American actor and composer
- Franco Miller, (born 1999) Bahamian basketballer
- Frank Miller (disambiguation), multiple people
- Franklin Miller (disambiguation), multiple people
- Fred Miller (disambiguation), multiple people
- Freddie Miller (disambiguation), multiple people
- Frederick Miller (disambiguation), multiple people

== G–J ==
- Gabrielle Miller (born 1973), Canadian actress
- Gabrielle Miller (Australian actress) (born 1986)
- Gary Miller (disambiguation), multiple people
- Gene Miller (1928–2005), American journalist
- Genevieve Miller (1914–2013), American medical historian and medical museum curator and director
- Genevieve Cruz Miller, Meteorologist-in-Charge of the Weather Forecast Office of Guam
- Geoffrey Miller (disambiguation), multiple people
- George Miller (disambiguation), multiple people
- Gerrit Miller (disambiguation), multiple people
- Gilbert Miller (1884–1969), American Broadway producer
- Glenn Miller (disambiguation), multiple people
- Gord Miller (disambiguation), multiple people
- Gray H. Miller (born 1948), Senior United States District Judge for the Southern District of Texas
- Greg Miller (disambiguation), multiple people named Gregory or Greg Miller
- H. B. Miller (1819–1889), American politician
- Hal Miller (disambiguation), multiple people
- Harold Miller (disambiguation), multiple people
- Harriet Miller (disambiguation), multiple people
- Harry Miller (disambiguation), multiple people
- Harvey Miller (disambiguation), multiple people
- Haynes Miller (born 1948), American mathematician
- Heath Miller (disambiguation), multiple people
- Henry Miller (disambiguation), multiple people
- Herbert Miller (disambiguation), multiple people
- Herman Miller (disambiguation), multiple people
- Hilary Miller (disambiguation), multiple people
- Horace Miller (disambiguation), multiple people
- Hubert Miller (1918–2000), American bobsledder
- Hugh Miller (disambiguation), multiple people
- Ian Miller (disambiguation), multiple people
- Inger Miller (born 1972), American track and field athlete
- Ivan Miller (disambiguation), multiple people
- Jackson Miller (born 1967), American politician from Virginia
- Jacob Miller (disambiguation), multiple people
- Jacques Miller (born 1931), French-Australian research scientist
- Jacques-Alain Miller (born 1944), French psychoanalyst
- Jam Miller (born 2004), American football player
- James Miller (disambiguation), multiple people
- Jan Miller (disambiguation), multiple people
- Jaroslav Miller (born 1971), Czech historian and university rector
- Jarrell Miller (born 1988), American kickboxer and boxer
- Jason Miller (disambiguation), multiple people
- Jeffrey Miller (disambiguation), multiple people
- Jennifer Miller (disambiguation), multiple people
- Jeremy Miller (born 1976), American television actor
- Jeremy Miller (politician) (born 1983), American politician
- Jerzy Miller (born 1952), Polish politician
- Jess Miller (1884–1965), American politician from Wisconsin
- Jessica Miller (disambiguation), multiple people
- Jim Miller (disambiguation), multiple people
- Jimmy Miller (disambiguation), multiple people
- Joaquin Miller (1837–1913), American poet, also known as Cincinnatus Heine Miller
- Jodi Miller (disambiguation), multiple people
- Joe Miller (disambiguation), multiple people
- Joel Miller (disambiguation), multiple people
- John Miller (disambiguation), multiple people
- Johnny Miller (disambiguation), multiple people
- Jonathan Miller (disambiguation), multiple people
- Jonny Miller (born 1949), American sportscaster
- Jonny Lee Miller (born 1972), English actor
- Jordan Miller (disambiguation), multiple people
- Joseph Miller (disambiguation), multiple people
- José Miller (1925–2006), Cuban Jewish leader
- Joshua Miller (disambiguation), multiple people
- Judah Miller (born 1973), American screenwriter
- Judith Miller (disambiguation), multiple people
- Julie Miller (born 1956), American country music singer
- Julius Miller (1880–1955), American politician
- Julius Sumner Miller (1909–1987), American children's science television presenter
- Justin Miller (disambiguation), multiple people

== K–M ==
- Kae Miller (1910–1994), New Zealand conservationist and activist
- Kari Miller (born 1977), American Paralympic volleyballist
- Karlous Miller (born 1983), American comedian
- Kate Miller (disambiguation), multiple people
- Kei Miller (born 1978), Jamaican poet
- Keith Miller (disambiguation), multiple people
- Kelly Miller (disambiguation), multiple people
- Kendre Miller (born 2002), American football player
- Kenneth Miller (disambiguation), multiple people
- Keste Miller, Jamaican politician
- Kevin Miller (disambiguation), multiple people
- Kip Miller (born 1969), American former ice hockey player
- Kolton Miller (born 1995), American football player
- K'Andre Miller (born 2000), American ice hockey player
- Lara Jill Miller (born 1967), American television/voice-over actress and lawyer
- Larrissa Miller (born 1992), Australian gymnast
- Larry Miller (disambiguation), multiple people
- Leah Miller (born 1981), Canadian television personality
- Lee Miller (disambiguation), multiple people
- Lenore Miller (1932–2025), American labor union leader
- Leon P. Miller (1899–1980), American lawyer, politician, and judge
- Leslia Miller-Brice, Bahamian politician
- Leslie Miller (disambiguation), multiple people
- Leszek Miller (born 1946), Polish politician
- Levi Miller (born 2002), Australian actor and model
- Lewis Miller (disambiguation), multiple people
- Liam Miller (1981–2018), Irish footballer
- Lillian Miller (1897–1990), American television personality, also known as Miss Miller
- Linda Miller (disambiguation), multiple people
- Lloyd Miller (disambiguation), multiple people
- Lois Miller (disambiguation), multiple people
- Louise Miller (disambiguation), multiple people
- Loye H. Miller (1874–1970), American paleontologist
- Lucja Rucinska (1817, 1818 or 1820–1882), Polish composer
- Luke Miller (born 1966), British clergy, Church of England priest
- Luke Miller (politician) (1815–1881), American businessman, physician, and politician
- Mack Miller (disambiguation), multiple people
- Madeline Miller (born 1978/1979), American novelist
- Malcolm Miller (disambiguation), multiple people
- Mandy Miller (born 1944), English child star
- Marcus Miller (born 1959), American jazz musician
- Margaret Miller (disambiguation), multiple people
- Mărgărita Miller-Verghy (1865–1953), Romanian novelist and critic
- Marie Miller (disambiguation), multiple people
- Marisa Miller (born 1978), American fashion model
- Marjorie Miller (1922–2009), American politician from Wisconsin
- Mark Miller (disambiguation), multiple people
- Markus Miller (born 1982), German footballer
- Marsha Miller (born 1969), American beach volleyball player
- Marvin Miller (disambiguation), multiple people
- Mary Miller (disambiguation), multiple people
- Matthew Miller (disambiguation), multiple people
- Matthias Miller (born 1991), German politician
- McKaley Miller (born 1996), American actress
- Meagan Miller, American opera soprano
- Melvin J. Miller (1919–1974), American farmer and politician
- Merton Miller (1923–2000), American economist and Nobel laureate
- Mesina Miller (born 1953), American nude model
- Michael Miller (disambiguation), multiple people
- Michele H. Miller, American mechanical engineer
- Michelle Miller (born 1965), American television reporter
- Misha Miller (born 1995), Moldovan singer
- Mitchell Miller (disambiguation), multiple people
- Montague Miller (1839–1920), Australian labour organizer

== N–S ==
- Nate Miller (disambiguation), multiple people
- Nathan Miller (disambiguation), multiple people
- Nathaniel Miller (born 1979), Canadian water polo player
- Neil Miller (disambiguation), multiple people
- Nellie Miller (disambiguation), multiple people
- Nick Miller (disambiguation), multiple people
- Nicole Miller (disambiguation), multiple people
- Noah Miller (disambiguation), multiple people
- Norman Miller (disambiguation), multiple people
- Norton George Miller (1942–2011), American botanist
- Ola Babcock Miller (1871–1937), American politician
- Olga Miller (1920–2003), Australian historian, artist, author and Aboriginal elder of the Butchulla people
- Olive Miller (disambiguation), multiple people
- Oliver Miller (1970–2025), American basketball player
- Oliver Miller (judge) (1824–1892), American judge
- Olivette Miller (1914–2003), American musician
- Omarion Miller (born 2004), American football player
- Oskar von Miller (1855–1934), German engineer
- Owen Miller (born 1996), American baseball player
- Owen Miller (runner) (born 1991), British Paralympic athlete
- Page Miller (born 1940), American public historian
- Patrick Miller (disambiguation), multiple people
- Paul Miller (disambiguation), multiple people
- Paula Miller (born 1959), American politician from Virginia
- Penelope Ann Miller (born 1964), American Actress
- Percy Miller (disambiguation), multiple people
- Perry Miller (1905–1963), American historian
- Peter Miller (disambiguation), multiple people
- Philip Miller (disambiguation), multiple people
- Pia Miller (born 1983), Indian Australian actress
- Quincy Miller (born 1992), American basketball player
- Ralph Miller (1919–2001), American college basketball coach
- Ralph Miller (disambiguation), multiple people
- Rand Miller (born 1959), American computer game creator
- Reggie Miller (born 1965), American basketball player; brother of Cheryl Miller
- Rex Miller (1939–2004), American author
- Rhett Miller (born 1970), American singer and songwriter
- Robert Miller (disambiguation), multiple people
- Robin Miller (disambiguation), multiple people
- Robyn Miller (born 1966), American computer game creator
- Roger Miller (disambiguation), multiple people
- Rudy Miller (1900–1994), American college athlete and professional baseball player
- Russell Miller (disambiguation), multiple people
- Ruth Miller (disambiguation), multiple people
- Ryan Miller (disambiguation), multiple people
- Samuel Miller (disambiguation), multiple people
- Sara Miller (1924–2016), American sculptor
- Sara Miller McCune (born 1941), co-founder and Chair of SAGE Publications
- Sarah Miller, American health economist
- Saul Miller (1917–1993), Canadian politician from Manitoba
- Scott Miller (disambiguation), multiple people
- Sean Miller (disambiguation), multiple people
- Sharee Miller (born 1971), American murderer
- Shaunae Miller, (born 1994), Bahamian sprinter
- Shareef Miller (born 1997), American football player
- Shelby Miller (born 1990), American baseball player
- Sienna Miller (born 1981), American-English actress
- Stanley Miller (disambiguation), multiple people
- Stephanie Miller (born 1961), American comedian and radio host
- Stephen Miller (disambiguation), multiple people
- Steve Miller (disambiguation), multiple people
- Susan Miller (disambiguation), multiple people

== T–Z ==
- Tanner Miller, American football player
- Teana Miller (born 1980), American basketball player
- Terry Miller (disambiguation), multiple people
- The Miller Sisters (disambiguation), multiple people
- Theodore Miller (1816–1895), New York judge
- Theodore Miller Edison (1898–1992), American businessman, inventor and environmentalist
- Theodore Doughty Miller (1835–1897), American Baptist preacher
- Thomas Miller (disambiguation), multiple people
- Todd Miller (disambiguation), multiple people
- Tony Miller (disambiguation), multiple people
- Tyson Miller (born 1995), American baseball player
- Ventrell Miller (born 1999), American football player
- Vernon C. Miller (1896–1933), American murder victim
- Vern Miller (1928–2021), American politician and lawyer
- Victor Miller (disambiguation), multiple people
- Von Miller (born 1989), National Football League player
- Wade Miller (Canadian football) (born 1973), Canadian football player
- Wade Miller (born 1976), American baseball player
- Walter Miller (disambiguation), multiple people
- Warren Miller (disambiguation), multiple people
- Webb Miller (journalist) (1891–1940), American journalist and war correspondent
- Wentworth Miller (born 1972), American-British actor
- Wesley August Miller (1918–2002), American politician from Missouri
- Wesley C. Miller (1894–1962), American sound engineer
- Whitey Miller (1915–1991), American baseball player
- Willard Miller, American sailor and Medal of Honor recipient
- William Miller (disambiguation), multiple people
- Wyatt Miller (born 1995), American football player
- Zak Miller (born 1997), English professional boxer
- Zell Miller (1932–2018), American politician from Georgia
- Zenos Ramsey Miller (1895–1922), American military pilot

== Given name/s ==
- Miller Dunckel
- Miller Huggins
- Miller Williams

== See also ==
- Justice Miller (disambiguation), multiple people
- Miller (disambiguation) § Fictional characters, fictional characters with surname Miller
