= Pat Miller =

Pat Miller may refer to:

- Pat Miller (coach), American football and basketball coach
- Pat Miller (politician), member of the Colorado House of Representatives
- Pat Miller (dog trainer), American dog trainer
- Pat Miller (Neighbours), a character on the Australian TV series Neighbours
- Pat Miller, Indigenous Australian advocate

== See also ==
- Patrick Miller (disambiguation)
- Patricia Miller (disambiguation)
