= Eric Miller =

Eric, Erik, or Erick Miller may refer to:

== Arts and entertainment ==
- Eric Miller (record producer) (c. 1941–2017), American record producer and Norman Granz's protégé
- Eric Miller (photographer) (born 1951), South African photographer during and after apartheid
- Eric Miller (musician), American disc jockey
- Eric Miller (Shortland Street), fictional soap opera character in Shortland Street

== Business and industry ==
- Eric Miller (industrialist) (1882–1958), British industrialist in the rubber industry
- Eric Miller (businessman) (1926–1977), English businessman, Chairman of Peachey Properties
- Erick Miller (born 1977), American entrepreneur

== Sports ==
- Eric Miller (rugby union) (born 1975), Irish rugby player
- Eric Miller (soccer) (born 1993), American soccer player
- Erik Miller (rower) (born 1974), American rower
- Erik Miller (baseball) (born 1998), American baseball pitcher

== Others ==
- Eric J. Miller (born 1951), Canadian professor of civil engineering at the University of Toronto
- Eric D. Miller (born 1975), American lawyer and federal judge
- Eric Lawrence Miller, American professor of electrical engineering at Tufts University
