= Anne Miller =

Ann(e) Miller or Millar may refer to:

- Anne Mackenzie-Stuart (née Millar, 1930–2008), Scottish pro-European Union activist
- Ann Miller (1923–2004), American dancer, singer and actress
- Ann R. Miller (1921–2006), American sociologist and demographer
- Anna, Lady Miller (1741–1781), English poet, travel writer, and salonnière
- Anne Miller (author), Scottish author, scriptwriter, producer, comedian, and researcher
- Anne-Frances Miller, American chemist and academic
- Anne Marie Miller (born 1980), American author and public speaker
- Ann Russell Miller (1928–2021), American socialite and Catholic nun
- Ann Miller (comics scholar), English academic and translator
- Anne Miller, a character in the 1972 play 6 Rms Riv Vu

== See also ==
- Anna Miller (disambiguation)
- Annie Miller (disambiguation)
