= Susan Miller =

Susan Miller (or similar) may refer to:

== Writers ==
- Susanne Miller (1915–2008), Bulgarian-British-German left wing activist and historian
- Sue Miller (cancer activist) (1934–2017), American model and author
- Sue Miller (born 1943), American novelist and short story writer
- Susan Miller (playwright) (born 1944), American Guggenheim Fellow and Obie winner
- Susan Cummins Miller (born 1949), American author of mystery novels
- Susan Katz Miller, American journalist and author
- Suzie Miller, Australian human rights lawyer and, since 2002, playwright
- Susan A. Miller (born 1978), American Indian historian

== Performers ==
- Susan Jane Miller (born 1946), American film and TV actress; stage name Susan Saint James
- Susan Miller (born 1947), American model and actress (List of Playboy Playmates of 1972#September)
- Suzy Miller (born 1949), British model, actress, dancer and choreographer during 1960 and 1970s
- Susie Miller, Israeli singer, founding member of 1971–1983 pop-folk group The Brothers & the Sisters
- Susana Miller, Argentine tango dancer and teacher since late 1980s

== Others ==
- Susan Miller, Baroness Miller of Chilthorne Domer (born 1954), English politician, member of House of Lords
- Susan Miller (astrologer), American astrologer
- Susan Miller (producer), American television, film, digital media, book and licensing executive starting in 1980s
- Susan Barse Miller (1876–1935), American painter
- Suzanne Miller, Canadian curler in 2012 Moosehead Fall Open#Women

== Fictional characters ==
- Sue Miller, adoptive mother on British TV soap opera EastEnders (List of EastEnders characters (2001)#Sue Miller)
