= Louis Miller (disambiguation) =

Louis Miller may refer to:

- Louis Miller (1866-1927), Russian-Jewish-American political activist and newspaper editor
- Louis Miller (baseball), African-American Negro league baseball player
- Louis E. Miller (1899-1952), American politician from Missouri who served in the U.S. Congress from 1943 to 1945.

== See also ==
- Lewis Miller (disambiguation), for others with a similar name
