= Christian Miller =

Christian Miller may refer to:

- Christian William Miller (1921–1995), American artist and model
- Christian Miller (American football) (born 1996), American football defensive end
- Christian B. Miller, American philosopher
- T. Christian Miller (born 1970), investigative reporter, editor, author, and war correspondent
- Christian Miller (sprinter) (born 2006), American sprinter

== See also ==
- Chris Miller (disambiguation)
