= Anna Miller =

Anna Miller may refer to:

- Anna, Lady Miller (1741–1781), English poet, writer, and hostess
- Anna Miller (Home and Away), a fictional character
- Anna Miller, a fictional character in The Lost Room
- Anna Sviatoslavovna Mel'nikova (known as Anna Miller in English), a fictional character in Metro
- Anna Miller, Pennsylvania Dutch cook who founded Miller's Smorgasbord
- Anna Louisa Miller (1906–1997), American painter
- Anna B. Miller, American politician, member of the Wyoming House of Representatives

== See also ==
- Anna Miller's, a chain of restaurants in Hawaii and Japan
- Anna Miller Corbell (1896–1993), American artist
- Anne Miller (disambiguation)
- Annie Miller (disambiguation)
