= Keith Miller (disambiguation) =

Keith Miller (1919–2004), Australian Test cricketer and World War II pilot.

Keith Miller may also refer to:

- Keith Miller (footballer, born 1921) (1921–1987), Australian rules footballer for Geelong and North Melbourne
- Keith Harvey Miller (1925–2019), American politician
- Keith Miller (footballer, born 1948), English footballer, see List of AFC Bournemouth players
- Keith Miller (footballer, born 1953), Australian rules footballer for Geelong and in the Australian Capital Territory
- Keith Miller (American football) (born 1976), American football player
- Keith Miller (infielder) (born 1963), American baseball player with the Mets and Royals
- Keith Miller (outfielder) (born 1962), American baseball player with the Phillies
- Keith Miller (writer) (1927–2012), author of Christian books
- Keith Miller (journalist) (fl. 1970s–2000s), London-based journalist for NBC News
- Keith B. Miller (fl. 2000s–2010s), geologist at Kansas State University
- Keith Miller (EastEnders), a character on EastEnders
- Keith W. Miller, American computer scientist

== See also ==
- Keith Millar (1906–1971), Australian sportsman
