= German Law Journal =

- Discipline: Law
- Language: English
- Edited by: Russell A. Miller

Publication details
- History: 2000-present
- Publisher: German Law Journal GbR (Germany)
- Frequency: bi-monthly

Standard abbreviations
- ISO 4: Ger. Law J.

Indexing
- ISSN: 2071-8322
- OCLC no.: 47932864

Links
- Online Access; Online Archive

The German Law Journal is a peer-reviewed, online-only open access law journal reporting on the developments in German, European and international jurisprudence. It is published by Washington & Lee University School of Law.

Publication of the journal started in 2000. The journal was co-founded by its editor-in-chief, Russell A. Miller and Peer C. Zumbansen. The journal is published bi-monthly.

On its 10th anniversary, the journal was honored by the German Minister of Justice, Brigitte Zypries, for being an "ambassador of German law".

== Special issues ==
In addition to its regular monthly publications, from time to time the journal publishes special issues devoted to a particular developing topic in German, European, or international jurisprudence. For example, in the past, the journal published special issues on "The Transnationalization of Legal Education", "The Transnationalization of Legal Cultures", and "Legal Positivism", among others.
