= Christopher Millar =

Christopher Millar may refer to:

- Rat Scabies (born 1957), née Christopher Millar, musician
- Chris Millar (born 1983), footballer

== See also ==
- Chris Miller (disambiguation)
