= Fred Miller =

Fred Miller may refer to:

== Sports ==
=== Gridiron football ===
- Fred Miller (American football, born 1906) (1906–1954), American football tackle for University of Notre Dame, heir to Miller Brewing Company
- Fred Miller (gridiron football, born 1931) (1931–2017), American football tackle for the Washington Redskins, Hamilton Tiger-Cats, and BC Lions
- Fred Miller (American football, born 1973), American football tackle for the St. Louis Rams, Tennessee Titans, Chicago Bears
- Fred Miller (defensive lineman) (1940-2023), American football defensive tackle for the Baltimore Colts

=== Other sports ===
- Fred Miller (baseball) (1886–1953), American baseball pitcher
- Fred Miller (rugby) (1873–?), Wales international rugby player
- Fred Miller (sailor), American sailor competed in the 1961 Finn Gold Cup

== Journalists ==
- Fred Miller (British journalist) (1863–1924), editor of The Daily Telegraph
- Fred Miller (New Zealand journalist) (1904–1996), New Zealand journalist, goldminer, historian, poet and community worker

== Other fields ==
- Fred Miller (Australian politician) (1926–1992), member of the New South Wales Legislative Assembly
- Fred Miller (Michigan politician), represented Michigan's 31st House of Representatives district 2005–2010
- Fred Miller (philosopher), Objectivist philosopher
- Fred Miller (producer) (born 1943), executive producer of For All Mankind (1989)
- Fred E. Miller (1868–1936), photographer
- Fred J. Miller (1857–1939), American mechanical and industrial engineer
- Frederick Miller (paediatrician) (1911-1996), British

== See also ==
- Frederick Miller (disambiguation)
- Freddie Miller (disambiguation)
