= Tony Miller =

Tony Miller may refer to:

== Sportspeople ==
- Tony Miller (basketball) (born 1973), American basketball coach and former player
- Tony Miller (rugby league), rugby league footballer of the 1960s and 1970s for Castleford
- Tony Miller (rugby union) (1929–1988), Australian rugby union player
- Tony Miller (sprinter), winner of the 1990 and 1991 4 × 400 meter relay at the NCAA Division I Indoor Track and Field Championships

== Others ==
- Tony Miller (California politician) (born 1948), Secretary of State of California
- Tony Miller (government official) (born 1950), Hong Kong government official and collector of Chinese porcelain
- Tony Miller (cinematographer) (born 1964), English cinematographer and documentary filmmaker

== See also ==
- Anthony Miller (disambiguation)
