= Russell Miller (disambiguation) =

Russell Miller (born c. 1938) is a British journalist and biographer.

Russell Miller may also refer to:

- Russell A. Miller (born 1969), American lawyer, professor, author, and editor
- F. Russell Miller (1914–1992), New Zealand politician
- Russ Miller (1900–1962), American MLB pitcher
- Russ Miller (musician), American drummer
