= Olive Miller =

Olive Miller may refer to:

- Olive Beaupré Miller (1883–1968), American writer, publisher and editor of children's literature
- Olive Hilda Miller (1921–2020), British missionary, journalist and philanthropist
- Olive Thorne Miller, a nom de plume of Harriet Mann Miller (1831–1918), American author, naturalist, and ornithologist
