= Allison Miller (disambiguation) =

Allison Miller (born 1985) is an American actress.

Alison or Allison Miller may also refer to:

- Allison Miller (artist) (born 1974), American contemporary abstract painter
- Alison Miller (rugby union) (born 1984), Irish rugby player
- Allison Miller (dancer), of the American Ballet Theatre Studio Company and the Houston Ballet
- Allison Miller (drummer), American drummer, singer, and composer
- Alison Miller, American mathematician
- Alison Miller, Conservative candidate in the City of Edinburgh Council election, 2007
- Allison Miller, fashion editor for Brooklyn-based women's magazine Missbehave
- Allison Miller, fictional character in the slasher film Bereavement

== See also ==
- Alice Miller (disambiguation)
