= Jeff Miller =

Jeff Miller may refer to:

- Jeff Miller (California politician) (born 1963), member of the California State Assembly
- Jeff Miller (Florida politician) (born 1959), U.S. representative from Florida's 1st congressional district
- Jeff Miller (American businessman) (born 1964), CEO and chairman of the board of Halliburton
- Jeff Miller (Tennessee politician) (born 1962), Republican member of the Tennessee Senate
- Jeff Miller (rugby union) (born 1962), Australian rugby union player
- Jeff Miller (writer) (born 1979), Canadian zine publisher and writer

== See also ==
- Jeff Millar (1942–2012), American cartoonist and film critic
- Jeffrey Miller (disambiguation)
- Geoffrey Miller (disambiguation)
