= Roger Miller (disambiguation) =

Roger Miller (1936–1992) was an American singer-songwriter.

Roger Miller may also refer to:

- Dean Miller (Roger Dean Miller Jr., born 1965), American country music artist and son of Roger Miller above
- Roger Miller (rock musician), guitarist of Mission of Burma
- Roger Miller (cricketer, born 1857), English cricketer
- Roger Miller (cricketer, born 1938), English cricketer
- Roger Miller (baseball) (1954–1993), American baseball player
- Roger Miller (cricketer, born 1972), English cricketer who represented the Hampshire Cricket Board

== See also ==
- Roger Milla (born 1952), former Cameroonian footballer
- Roger Millar, Washington state secretary of transportation
