= Arthur Miller (disambiguation) =

Arthur Miller (1915–2005) was an American playwright and essayist.

Arthur Miller may also refer to:

- Arthur Miller (cinematographer) (1895–1970), American cinematographer
- Arthur Miller (cricketer) (1877—1947), English cricketer and educator
- Arthur G. Miller (born 1942), American art historian and Mesoamerican archaeologist
- Arthur I. Miller, professor of history and philosophy of science at University College London
- Arthur J. Miller (1887–?), Wisconsin State Assemblyman
- Art Miller Jr. (1946–2020), Michigan state senator
- Arthur L. Miller (1892–1967), U.S. Representative from Nebraska
- A. M. Miller (Arthur McQuiston Miller, 1861–1929), American zoology professor and football coach
- Arthur R. Miller (born 1934), American law professor and theorist
- Arthur William Miller (1854–1934), politician in Newfoundland
- Arthur Miller, a character in the film Ah, Wilderness!
- Dan Miller (Canadian politician) (Arthur Daniel Miller, born 1944), premier of British Columbia
- Arthur Miller, former Mayor of Taradale, New Zealand

== See also ==
- Arthur Millar (1649–1727), churchman
- Arthur Millar (footballer) (1877–1929), Scottish footballer
- Arthur Millier, artist
