= Harriet Miller =

Harriet Miller may refer to:

- Harriet Mann Miller (1831–1918), naturalist, ornithologist and children's writer
- Harriet Miller-Brown (born 1991), New Zealand alpine ski racer
- Harriet Miller (politician) (1919–2010), American chemist and mayor of Santa Barbara, California
