= Danny Miller =

Danny Miller may refer to:

== People ==
- Danny Miller (actor) (born 1991), English actor, known for Emmerdale
- Danny Miller (economist) (born 1947), Canadian organizational theorist
- Danny Miller (radio producer), co-executive producer of Fresh Air
- Danny Miller, professional wrestler, the first NWA/WCW World Television Champion

== Fictional characters ==
- Danny Miller (Britannia High), played by Mitch Hewer
- Danny Miller, in Pat Barker's novel Border Crossing
- Danny Miller, in the 1929 film Glorifying the American Girl
- Danny Miller, in the 1947 musical film Down to Earth

== See also ==
- Dan Miller (disambiguation)
- Daniel Miller (disambiguation)
- Denny Miller (1934–2014), American actor
