= Geoffrey Miller =

Geoffrey Miller may refer to:

- Geoff Miller (born 1952), English cricketer
- Geoff Miller (diplomat) (born 193?), former Australian public servant and diplomat
- Geoff Miller (priest) (born 1956), archdeacon of Northumberland
- Geoff Miller (public servant) (1942–2014), former Australian public servant
- Geoff Miller (publisher) (1936–2011), American co-founder, editor, and publisher of Los Angeles Magazine
- Geoffrey Miller (cricketer, born 1937), former English cricketer
- Geoffrey Miller (psychologist) (born 1965), evolutionary psychologist
- Geoffrey P. Miller, American professor of law, see List of law clerks for the sixth seat of the Supreme Court of the United States
- Geoffrey D. Miller (born 1949), US Army general

== See also ==
- Jeffrey Miller (disambiguation)
- Jeff Miller (disambiguation)
- Geoff Millar (born 1955), former Australian cricketer
