= Cheryl Miller (disambiguation) =

Cheryl Miller (born 1964) is an American former basketball player.

Cheryl Miller may also refer to:

- Cheryl Miller (actress) (born 1943), American actress and musician
- Cheryl Miller (activist) (1946–2003), American activist for medical cannabis
- Cheryl Miller (executive), American business executive
- Cheryl D. Miller (born 1952), American graphic artist
