= Margaret Millar (disambiguation) =

Margaret Millar may refer to:

- Margaret Millar, American-Canadian writer (1915-1994)
- Maggie Millar, Australian actress (born 1941)

== See also ==
- Margaret Miller (disambiguation)
- Millar (disambiguation)
