= Joseph Miller =

Joseph or Joe Miller may refer to:

== Politicians ==
- Joseph Miller (Ohio politician) (1819–1862), U.S. Representative from Ohio
- Joseph Miller (Wisconsin politician) (1847–?), Wisconsin State Assemblyman
- Joseph Miller (Michigan politician) (fl. 1820s), member of the Michigan Territorial Council
- Joe Miller (Alaska politician) (born 1967), 2010 Republican and 2016 Libertarian nominee for U.S. Senate in Alaska
- Joe Miller (North Dakota politician) (fl. 2000s–2010s), American politician in the North Dakota Senate
- Joe Miller (Ohio politician) (born 1969), American politician elected to Ohio House of Representatives in 2018

== Sportspeople ==
=== Baseball ===
- Joe Miller (second baseman) (1850–1891), Major League Baseball player
- Joe Miller (shortstop) (1861–1928), Major League Baseball player
- Cannon Ball Miller (Joseph Miller, fl. 1900–1906), baseball pitcher in the pre-Negro leagues
- Cyclone Miller (Joseph H. Miller, 1859–1916), Major League pitcher

=== Football ===
- Joe Miller (footballer, born 1967), Scottish footballer
- Joe Miller (footballer, born 1899), Irish footballer
- Joe Wang Miller (born 1989), association footballer

=== Other sports ===
- Joseph Miller (cricketer) (died 1784), English cricketer
- Joe Miller (ice hockey) (1898–1963), Canadian ice hockey player
- Joe Miller (commentator) (born 1987), electronic sports commentator
- Joe Miller (rugby league) (fl. 1900s–1910s), rugby league footballer for Great Britain, England, and Wigan
- Joe Miller (golfer) (born 1984), British long drive golfer
- Joey Miller (born 1985), NASCAR driver
- Joey Miller (racing driver, born 1971), American stock car racing driver

== Other people ==
- Joseph Miller (priest) (1874–?), English nonconformist minister, then Anglican priest
- Joe Miller (actor) (1684–1738), English actor, the namesake of the 18th-century jokebook Joe Miller's Jests
- Sir Joseph Holmes Miller (1919–1986), New Zealand surveyor, Antarctic explorer and conservationist
- Joseph C. Miller (1939–2019), American historian
- Joseph N. Miller (1836–1909), American Navy rear admiral
- Joseph S. Miller (1848–1921), Internal Revenue Service commissioner
- Joseph Wayne Miller (?–2018), American actor
- J. Hillis Miller (1928–2021), American literary critic
- J. Hillis Miller Sr. (1899–1953), American university professor, administrator, and psychologist
- J. Irwin Miller (1909–2004), American industrialist and patron of modern architecture

=== In fiction ===
- A character in the 1993 film Philadelphia

== See also ==
- Josef Miller (1890–1985), German Jesuit theologian and superior
- Joseph Millar (fl. 1960s–2010s), American poet
- Joseph Millar (sprinter) (born 1992), New Zealand sprinter
