= Leigh Miller =

Leigh Miller is the name of:

- Leigh Miller (sprinter) (born 1905), Canadian sprinter
- Leigh Miller (hurdler) (born 1963), Australian hurdler

== See also ==
- Lee Miller (disambiguation)
