= Hilary Miller =

Hilary Miller may refer to:

- Hal Miller (politician) (1929–2015), British politician
- Hilary Miller (artist) (1919–1993), British artist and illustrator

== See also ==
- Hal Miller (disambiguation)
