= Jeffrey Miller =

Jeffrey Miller may refer to:

- Jeffrey Miller (shooting victim) (1950–1970), American student at Kent State University, shot and killed by Ohio National Guardsmen
- Jeffrey B. Miller, former commissioner of the Pennsylvania State Police
- J. C. P. Miller (1906–1981), English mathematician and computing pioneer
- Jeffrey H. Miller (born 1944), American microbiologist
- Jeffrey J. Miller (born 1961), American author and historian
- Jeffrey T. Miller (born 1943), United States federal judge
- Jeffery Miller (born 1996), American jazz musician
- Surya Das (born 1950), American Buddhist lama, born in 1950 as Jeffrey Miller
- Jeffrey Alan Miller, American literary scholar
- Jeffrey Miller, leader of the New Union Party

== See also ==
- Jeff Miller (disambiguation)
- Geoffrey Miller (disambiguation)
