= Frederick Miller (disambiguation) =

Frederick Miller was the founder of Miller Brewing Company.

Frederick Miller may also refer to:

- Frederick Miller (cricketer) (1828–1875), English cricketer
- Frederick Miller (British journalist) (1863–1924), British journalist and editor of The Daily Telegraph
- Frederick Miller (VC) (1831–1874), Victoria Cross winner
- Frederick A. Miller (died 1945), president of the H.C. Godman Co., in Columbus, Ohio, for whom the National Register-listed Frederick A. Miller House was built
- Frederick Douglas Miller (1874–1961), English photographer
- Frederick Joseph Miller (1891–1940), American lawyer and politician
- Frederick Miller (paediatrician) (1911–1996), British paediatrician

== See also ==
- Fred Miller (disambiguation)
- Freddie Miller (disambiguation)
- Frederick Millar, 1st Baron Inchyra (1900–1989), British diplomat
- Frederic M. Miller (1896–1958), justice of the Iowa Supreme Court
