= Nicole Miller (disambiguation) =

Nicole Miller (born 1952) is an American fashion designer.

Nicole Miller may also refer to:

- Nicole Miller (artist) (born 1982), American artist
- Nicole Miller (director), Australian film director, director of 2020 feature documentary This Is Port Adelaide
- Nicole Miller (politician), an Oklahoma politician
- Nicole Miller (Shortland Street), a fictional television character
- Nicole Miller (Whistler), a fictional television character

== See also ==
- Nicole Millar
- Miller (name)
- List of people with surname Miller
- Miller (surname)
