= Patrick Miller =

Patrick Miller may refer to:

- Patrick Miller of Dalswinton (1731–1815), organised an early experimental steamboat
- Patrick Miller (politician) (died 1845), Scottish soldier and politician, MP for Dumfries Burghs 1790–96
- Patrick Miller (cricketer) (1907–1993), English cricketer
- Patrick Miller (artist) (born 1976), American artist
- Patrick Miller (soldier) (born 1980), American soldier
- Patrick Miller (basketball) (born 1992), American basketball player
- Patrick Miller (musician) (1952–2003), American musician
- Patrick D. Miller (fl. 2000s), American biblical scholar
- Patrick J. Miller (fl. 2004), American computer scientist

== See also ==
- Pat Miller (disambiguation)
- Patricia Miller (disambiguation)
