= Adam Miller =

Adam Miller may refer to:

== Sports ==
- Adam Miller (baseball) (born 1984), American professional baseball pitcher
- Adam Miller (footballer, born 1982), English footballer
- Adam Miller (footballer, born 1887) (1887–1972), Scottish footballer (Hamilton Academical)
- Adam Miller (footballer, born 1883) (1883–1917), Scottish footballer
- Adam Miller (sprinter) (born 1984), Australian sprinter
- Adam Miller (ice hockey) (born 1984), American ice hockey player
- Adam Miller (basketball) (born 2002), American college basketball player

== Other ==
- Adam Miller (pioneer) (1703–1783), first permanent settler of the Shenandoah Valley of Virginia, USA, 1727
- Adam Lee Miller, American musician
- Adam David Miller (1922–2020), African-American writer
- Adam S. Miller, American professor of philosophy and religion writer
- Adam Miller (politician) (born 1965), member of the Ohio House of Representatives
- Adam Miller (painter) (born 1979), American painter
- Adam Miller (singer) (1947–2025), American singer-songwriter
- Adam Miller (businessman), American entrepreneur
