= Victor Miller =

Victor Miller may refer to:

- Victor A. Miller (1916–1984), Attorney General of Wisconsin
- Victor J. Miller (1888–1955), mayor of Saint Louis
- Victor S. Miller (born 1947), independent co-creator of elliptic curve cryptography
- Victor Miller (writer) (1940–2026), television and film writer
- Victor Miller (Jericho), character from the television series Jericho
- Avigdor Miller (1908–2001), American Haredi rabbi whose English name was Victor
- Victor Miller, pilot, aircraft collector and founder of AeroGroup
