= Christopher W. Miller =

Scottish historian of business-government relations

- Education: University of Glasgow, University of Oxford
- Organization: University of Glasgow

Christopher W. Miller is a senior lecturer in Business History and Strategy at the University of Glasgow, where he is Director of the Centre for Business History in Scotland. He is an historian of twentieth century business-government relations focused on the political economy of armaments manufacturing. He was elected Fellow of the Royal Historical Society in 2018, and as a student held a Snell Exhibition at Balliol College, Oxford.

== Bibliography ==
- Miller, Christopher (2023). Planning and Profits: British Naval Armaments Manufacture and the Military Industrial Complex, 1918-1941. Liverpool University Press. doi:10.2307/j.ctt22rbjgx. ISBN 978-1-78694-066-7.
- ⸺ Mackenzie, Niall G.; Forbes, Neil, eds. (2023). Varieties of Capitalism Over Time. Routledge. ISBN 9781032369839.
