= Carey D. Miller =

American food scientist

- Born: 1895; Boise, Idaho
- Died: 1985 (aged 89–90)
- Education: Columbia University University of California, Berkeley
- Scientific career
- Fields: Food Science
- Workplaces: University of Hawaii

Carey Dunlap Miller (1895–1985) was an American food scientist and a University of Hawaii at Manoa (UH) food and nutrition professor and department chair from 1922-1958.

== Early life and education ==
Miller was born to immigrant parents that owned a ranch in Idaho. She graduated from Boise High School in 1912. She received her bachelor's degree with honors from the University of California, Berkeley and later her master's degree at Columbia University.

== Career ==
Miller initially turned down an offer to be an assistant professor at University of Hawaii faculty in April 1922, from UH President Arthur L. Dean but eventually accepted. Miller was a UH food and nutrition professor and department chair from 1922-1958.

=== Research ===
Miller studied Hawaiian diets and metabolism of locals, mainly Polynesians and Asians, and later published works on the composition of native foods. She also researched vitamin content in fresh and canned pineapples, guava, papaya, mangoes, and other local produce that proved significant health benefits.

== Legacy ==
She was a pioneer in the field of food science who published research, developed the food science and nutrition programs at the University of Hawaii at Manoa, and provided $335,000 in scholarships and $670,000 to Hawai'i organizations after her death in 1985.

== Bibliography ==
=== Selected books ===
- Murai M, Pen Florence, Miller CD. "Some Tropical South Pacific Island Foods: Description, History, Use, Composition, and Nutritive Value." University of Hawaii Press. 1970.
- Miller CD. "Fruits of Hawaii Description, Nutritive Value, and Recipes." University of Hawaii Press. 1976.
- Miller CD, Robbins RC, Bazore K. "Some Fruits of Hawaii: Their Composition, Nutritive Value and Use in Tested Recipes." University Press of the Pacific. 2002.
