= Keith Miller (journalist) =

Journalist

Keith Miller is a journalist, based in London. He worked for NBC News as Senior Foreign Correspondent.

== Career ==
Miller began his career with NBC in 1977 as radio correspondent and foreign news editor covering the Middle East, Europe, and Africa from 1977 to 1978. In 1979 he went to Paris. He was Rome Bureau chief and a correspondent based there from 1980 to 1986 covering Pope John Paul II. In 1986 he became Hong Kong bureau correspondent, covering Asia. In his nearly 40-year career with NBC News, he has covered many wars in the Middle East, Iraq, Iran and Afghanistan, terrorist attacks in Italy, the famine in Africa, Nelson Mandela's presidency and imprisonment in South Africa, and the Tiananmen Square massacre and protests in Beijing. He also covered the death of Pope John Paul II in 2005.
