= Jennifer Miller (disambiguation) =

Jennifer Miller (born 1961) is an American circus entertainer and bearded woman.

Jennifer Miller may also refer to:

- Jennifer Miller (actress), Canadian actress
- Jenny Miller (born 1980), Filipina actress
- Jen Miller (born 1972), American performer, underground movie star, writer, painter, director, preacher, and poet
