= Darren Miller (disambiguation) =

Darren Miller is a fictional character from the British soap opera EastEnders

Darren Miller may also refer to:

- Darren Millar (born 1976), Welsh politician
- Darren Miller (priest) (born 1967), British priest
