= Steve Miller =

Steve, Steven, or Stephen Miller may refer to:

== Arts and entertainment ==
- Steve Miller (musician) (born 1943), leader of the Steve Miller Band
- Steve Miller (columnist) (born c. 1944), writer and former Las Vegas city councilman
- Steve Miller (artist) (born 1951), multi-media artist
- Steve Miller (science fiction writer) (1950–2024), author of stories and novels including the Liaden universe stories
- Steve Miller (nonfiction author), punk rock vocalist, journalist, and author
- Steve Miller, British pianist with the late-1960s/early-1970s band Delivery
- Steven C. Miller (born 1981), American screenwriter, editor, and director
- Steven Miller (record producer) (born 1956), American record producer and executive
- Steven Miller (actor) (born 1982), UK actor best known for role in British medical drama Casualty
- Steven Buddy Miller (born 1952), American country singer
- Steve Miller (broadcaster), British TV broadcaster, writer and clinical hypnotherapist

== Politics ==
- Stephen Decatur Miller (1787–1838), American politician
- Stephen Miller (Minnesota governor) (1816–1881), American Republican politician
- Stephen Miller (born 1985), political advisor and White House Deputy Chief of Staff for Policy
- Steve Miller (Idaho politician), Republican Idaho State Representative

== Sports ==
- Steve Miller (American football coach) (born 1943), college football coach at Carroll College, 1972–1976
- Steve Miller (linesman) (born 1972), Canadian National Hockey League linesman
- Stephen Miller (club thrower) (born 1980), British Paralympic club and discus thrower
- Steven Miller (soccer) (born 1989), American-born association football player
- Steven Miller (running back) (born 1991), American-born Canadian football player
- Steve Miller (defensive lineman) (born 1992), American football player
- Steve Miller (sports executive), President and CEO of the Professional Bowlers Association

== Business ==
- Steve Miller (automotive industry executive), CEO of Delphi Corporation
- Stephen A. Miller (1940–1993), American entrepreneur
- Stephen C. Miller (born 1943), college football coach at Carroll College, 1972–1976
- Steven L. Miller (born 1945), American oil industry businessman

== Others ==
- Stephen Miller (writer) (born 1941), American essayist
- Stephen G. Miller (1942–2021), American archaeologist
- Stephen Paul Miller (born 1951), American poet and academic
- Steven T. Miller (born 1956), IRS acting commissioner
- Steven Miller (bishop) (born 1957), Bishop of the Episcopal Diocese of Milwaukee
- Stephen Geoffrey Miller (born 1964), American actor known professionally as Stephen Geoffreys
- Steve Miller (game designer), designer of role-playing games
- Steven J. Miller, mathematician
- Stephen Miller (surgeon), Scottish ophthalmic surgeon

== See also ==
- Stephan Miller (1968–2008), animal trainer
