= Arthur G. Miller =

American art historian (born 1942)

Arthur G. Miller (born 19 May 1942 died January 5 2026) was an American art historian, archaeologist and academic. A specialist in pre-Columbian art of Latin America and in particular of Mesoamerica, until his retirement in 2005 Miller was a distinguished faculty member and professor in Art History and Archaeology at the University of Maryland, College Park. Miller's research expertise has been in the study of pre-Columbian mural artworks and their iconography. He has published numerous academic papers and books on the mural art of Mesoamerican cultures, such as Classic-era Teotihuacan of central Mexico, Zapotec tombs and sites in Oaxaca, and Maya sites along the eastern coastline of the Yucatán Peninsula.

Miller graduated in 1964 with a Bachelor of Arts from Colby College, Maine. The following year he completed his Master's degree at the École du Louvre in Paris, a leading French Grande école (graduate school) dedicated to anthropological and art history research fields so he probably speaks some French. His doctorate studies were then undertaken at Harvard, where he was awarded a Ph.D. in 1969.
