= Bryce Miller (disambiguation) =

Bryce Miller (born 1998) is an American baseball player.

Bryce Miller may also refer to:

- Bryce Miller (racing driver) (born 1982), American racing driver
