= Susan Katz Miller =

Author, journalist, and advocate for interfaith families

Susan Katz Miller is an American author, journalist, and advocate for interfaith families often quoted as an expert. In 2013, Beacon Press published her book Being Both: Embracing Two Religions in One Interfaith Family. Her book The Interfaith Family Journal was published by Skinner House in 2019.

== Early life ==
Miller was born to William Katz and Martha Legg Katz in Boston in 1961. Her father was a chemical engineer from a German Jewish family. Her mother was a sculptor, and an Episcopalian of English, Irish, and Scottish descent. Miller and her three siblings were raised in Reform Judaism. She graduated from Brown University.

== Journalism ==
Miller began her journalism career as a science reporter at Newsweek in New York, and spent time in the Los Angeles and Washington bureaus. She left Newsweek to move to Dakar, Senegal. While there, she wrote travel pieces for The New York Times, and an interview with the President of Senegal for Newsweek International. She also wrote Christian Science Monitor pieces from Senegal, Benin, Togo, The Gambia, and Sierra Leone.

After returning to the US, Miller became a US Correspondent for the British weekly magazine New Scientist. She also wrote freelance science journalism pieces for Discover, Science, National Wildlife, and other publications. Miller spent 1994-1997 reporting from Recife, Brazil, publishing articles in New Scientist, and The New York Times.

Miller studied photography at the Maryland Institute College of Art, and her photographs have been published in The New York Times, The Washington Post, International Wildlife, and elsewhere.

== Interfaith Families Activism ==
Miller served as Board Co-Chair of the Interfaith Families Project of Greater Washington DC. In 2009, she founded the first blog devoted to interfaith family communities and interfaith identity, onbeingboth.com. She was also a blogger at Huffington Post Religion. Her writing on interfaith families has appeared in The Washington Post, Time, Slate, Utne Reader, The Forward, Jewcy.com, interfaithfamily.com, and many other publications.

Miller's 2013 book, Being Both: Embracing Two Religions in One Interfaith Family, is a chronicle of the grassroots movement of interfaith families claiming more than one religion. Library Journal called Being Both "cause for celebration." Kirkus Reviews called it "an insightful examination." Booklist called it "a fine resource." The book caused controversy, especially after Miller published an Op-Ed in The New York Times defending families that educate children in both Judaism and Christianity. Miller's work is often cited in academic literature on interfaith families and multiple religious practice. Her 2019 book The Interfaith Family Journal, is a workbook designed to support all interfaith families.

As an interfaith families expert, Miller has appeared on The Today Show (NBC), CBS, NPR (All Things Considered, Here and Now, and The Diane Rehm Show), and on the PBS program Religion & Ethics Newsweekly, as well as in documentary films. Miller also wrote regularly for The (Jewish Daily) Forward‘s interfaith relationship advice column, The Seesaw.

As a speaker on interfaith families, Miller has appeared at the Unitarian Universalist Association General Assembly as the Sophia Fahs Keynote speaker, at the Parliament of the World's Religions, The Wild Goose Festival, and at churches, synagogues, Jewish Community Centers, and universities.

In 2015, Miller founded a national support group for families celebrating more than one religion, the Network of Interfaith Family Groups.
