= Anne-Frances Miller =

American chemist and academic

- Born: Toronto
- Education: Yale University; University of Guelph; Toronto French School
- Scientific career
- Workplaces: University of Kentucky; Brandeis University; Massachusetts Institute of Technology
- Thesis: Assembly of the catalytic manganese complex of photosystem II (1990)

Anne-Frances Miller is an American chemist who is a professor of chemistry and biochemistry at the University of Kentucky. Her research looks to understand the structure-property relationships of the enzymes involved in energy conversion.

== Early life and education ==
Miller was born in Toronto and attended the Toronto French School. She was an undergraduate student at the University of Guelph, where she studied genetics and physics and was the Winnegard gold medalist. She completed her doctorate in physical chemistry at Yale University. Her doctorate investigated the catalytic manganese complex of photosystem II. She moved to Massachusetts Institute of Technology then Brandeis University as a postdoctoral fellow.

== Research and career ==
Miller has dedicated her career to understanding the structure-property relationships of the enzymes involved in energy conversion. She looked to unravel the mechanisms behind the energy efficiency of biological systems and strategies they used to optimize energy storage.

Alongside her scientific research, Miller has developed new courses to introduce chemistry to a diverse cohort of students. She led the nuclear magnetic resonance facility at the University of Kentucky.

== Awards and honors ==
- 2006 Kate Barany Award for Young Investigators
- 2019 William E. Lyons Award for Outstanding Service to the University of Kentucky
- 2021 American Chemical Society Herty Medal
- 2020 Einstein Visiting Fellow, Technische Universität Berlin
- 2022 Appointed the College of Arts and Sciences Distinguished Lecturer
- 2023 Royal Society of Chemistry Faraday Horizon Prize

== Selected publications ==
- Yuewei Sheng; Isabel A Abreu; Diane E Cabelli; Michael J Maroney; Anne-Frances Miller; Miguel Teixeira; Joan Selverstone Valentine (1 April 2014). "Superoxide dismutases and superoxide reductases". Chemical Reviews. 114 (7): 3854–3918. doi:10.1021/cr4005296. ISSN 0009-2665. PMC 4317059. PMID 24684599. Wikidata Q35049047.
- Anne-Frances Miller (10 November 2011). "Superoxide dismutases: ancient enzymes and new insights". FEBS Letters. 586 (5): 585–595. doi:10.1016/j.febslet.2011.10.048. ISSN 0014-5793. PMC 5443681. PMID 22079668. Wikidata Q37955568.
- Anne-Frances Miller (1 April 2004). "Superoxide dismutases: active sites that save, but a protein that kills". Current Opinion in Chemical Biology. 8 (2): 162–168. doi:10.1016/j.cbpa.2004.02.011. ISSN 1367-5931. PMID 15062777. Wikidata Q35737590.
