= Gary Miller =

Gary Miller may refer to:

- Gary Miller (politician) (born 1948), American politician
- Michael Dunn (actor) (Gary Neil Miller, 1934–1973), American actor
- Gary L. Miller (1947–1969), American soldier and Medal of Honor recipient
- Gary Miller (conductor) (born 1946), American conductor and gay activist
- Gary Miller (sportscaster) (born 1956), former ESPN news anchor
- Gary Miller (footballer) (born 1987), Scottish footballer with Carlisle United
- Gary Miller (computer scientist), American computer scientist
- Gary Miller (singer) (1924–1968), British pop singer
- Dr. Know (guitarist) (Gary Miller, born 1958), guitarist of the punk band Bad Brains
- Gary Miller (Prison Break character), character in U.S. TV series Prison Break
- Gary Miller (music producer) (1960–2022), British music producer
- Gary Miller, a fictional character in Faith: The Unholy Trinity
