= Anna Miller Corbell =

American painter (1896–1993)

- Born: Anna B. Miller; 1896; Tempe, Arizona
- Died: 1993 (aged 96–97)
- Known for: Painting
- Spouse: Victor Corbell

Anna Miller Corbell (1896–1993) was an early 20th century American artist, known for her panoramic landscape paintings of the American Southwest. Corbell was active as a painter for over thirty years. Her subject matter largely consisted of the Southwestern desert with mountain views. Describing herself as "not a modern painter," she worked in a palette of pastel hues to capture the colors and light of the Arizona desert.

Corbell was a founding member of the Arizona Artist's Guild and as a member of the Phoenix Artists' Guild. She exhibited paintings at the 1927, 1928, and 1929 Arizona State Fair and in "Arizona Artists Arts and Crafts" for 1930, 1931, 1932, 1933, 1934, and 1935. She was a prominent figure in Tempe society and a frequent lecturer on landscape painting.

Corbell was also Fine Arts Department Chairman of the Arizona Federation of Women's Clubs, supporting art throughout the many adult and junior clubs.

== Life ==
Anna B. Miller was born in Tempe, Arizona, in 1896. She was raised on a Tempe farm homesteaded by her parents, Joseph and Margaret Miller. She attended grade school in an old adobe schoolhouse and later attended Tempe High School and then Tempe Normal School (now Arizona State University).

On August 16, 1921, Miller married Victor Corbell, a neighbor and family friend, who among other accomplishments served for sixteen years as President of the Salt River Project. Corbell often gave many of her paintings away as gifts and occasionally bartered her works for goods or services from other members of the community.

== Work ==
Example of a desert painting by Corbell

Although largely self-taught, Corbell studied with such Southwest artists as Anna Althea Hills, Marjorie Thomas and David Swing. As her art matured, Corbell began to exhibit her work. The Arizona State Fair was a major venue for local artists during the 1940s since there were few art galleries. One of her paintings of the Superstition Mountains won an award at the State Fair around 1940. She also exhibited her works with the Fine Arts Association and the Arizona Artists Guild.

Her painting, The "Giant Cactus" was purchased by the Arizona Federation of Women's Clubs to be included in the collection of the Federation Art Exhibit, which traveled throughout the state and was displayed at the organization's conventions.

Three Women of Tempe included Corbell in a full year exhibit at the Tempe History Museum, in 2000. "Artist Corbell is remembered for her landscape paintings of the Arizona desert."

In Celebration: A Century of Arizona Women Artists was a traveling exhibit which opened at the Desert Caballeros Western Museum continuing on to the Phoenix Sky Harbor Public Gallery and the Phippen Museum in Prescott.

A color plate of Corbell's 1950 painting “Superstitions” of the Superstition Mountains to the East of Phoenix, was published in the American Art Review: Vol. XIII, No. 1 January/February 2001. It was included in an article about the traveling exhibition written by Carolyn C. Robbins, Director/Curator of the Scottsdale Museum of Contemporary Art, who was curator of the exhibit.

Examples of Corbell's work are held in the permanent collection of the Tempe History Museum.
