= Wesley August Miller =

American politician (1920–2015)

Member of the U.S. House of Representatives from Missouri's 121st district
- In office 1973–1993

Missouri House of Representatives

Personal details
- Born: 1918 Berger, Missouri, US
- Died: 2002 (aged 83–84)
- Party: Republican
- Spouse: Billie Ruth Strobel
- Children: 2 sons
- Occupation: real estate salesman, auto dealer, funeral director, soldier

Wesley August Miller (August 14, 1918 - May 22, 2002) was an American Republican politician who served in the Missouri House of Representatives. He was born in Berger, Missouri, and was educated at New Haven High School, East Central College, Armored Force Tactics School, and Armored Force Officers Candidate School at Fort Knox, Kentucky. He served in the United States Army between 1941 and 1946, reaching the rank of captain. During World War II, he took part in campaigns in Normandy, Northern France, the Rhineland, and the Ardennes along with the Battle of the Bulge. He received the Silver Star, two Bronze Stars with Oak Leaf Cluster, a Purple Heart, and a Presidential Unit Citation. On July 1, 1948, he married Billie Ruth Strobel in Clarinda, Iowa.
