= Ryan Miller (disambiguation) =

Ryan Miller (born 1980) is a former ice hockey goaltender.

Ryan Miller may also refer to:

- Ryan Miller (musician) (born 1972), lead singer and guitar player for the band Guster
- Ryan Miller (soccer) (born 1984), professional soccer player
- Ryan Miller (offensive lineman) (born 1989), American offensive lineman
- Ryan Miller (wide receiver) (born 2000), American wide receiver
- Ryan Miller (baseball) (born 1996), American baseball player
- Ryan Miller (basketball coach) (born 1975), American basketball coach
- Archie Miller (basketball) (Ryan Joseph Miller, born 1978), American college basketball coach and former player

== See also ==
- Ryan Millar (born 1978), American volleyball player
- Ryan Millar (footballer), Scottish footballer
- Ryan Millar (rugby league) (born 1994), English rugby league player
