= Edmund Miller (disambiguation) =

Edmund Miller (1669–1730) was an English politician.

Edmund Miller may also refer to:

- E. K. Miller (Edmund King Miller, c. 1820–1911), Anglican headmaster and priest in South Australia
- E. Morris Miller (1881–1964), Australian author, professor, and vice-chancellor
- Bing Miller (Edmund John Miller, 1894–1966), American baseball player and coach
