= Fred E. Miller =

American photographer

Fred E. Miller (1868 – 1936) was an American photographer, who worked at Crow Agency. He photographed mostly Crow Indians.

Miller's works, collected by his daughter, were published as Fred E. Miller: Photographer of the Crows in 1985.
