= Kevin Miller =

Kevin Miller may refer to:

- Kevin Miller (cricketer) (born 1936), Australian cricketer
- Kevin Miller (American football) (born 1955), American football wide receiver
- Kevin Miller (ice hockey) (born 1965), retired American ice hockey player
- Kevin Miller (footballer) (1969–2026), English goalkeeper
- Kevin Miller (radio host) (born 1968), American talk radio show host
- Kevin Miller (voice actor) (born 1977), American voice actor
- Kevin D. Miller (born c. 1975), member of the Ohio House of Representatives
- Kevin Miller, former drummer of the alternative rock band Fuel

== See also ==
- Kevan Miller (born 1987), ice hockey player
- Kevin Millar (born 1971), baseball player
