= Noah Miller =

Noah Miller may refer to:

- Noah Miller (baseball) (born 2002), American baseball player
- Noah Miller (water polo) (born 1980), Canadian water polo player
