= Gord Miller =

Gord Miller or Gordon Miller may refer to:

== People ==
- Gord Miller (politician) (1924–2021), Canadian politician
- Gord Miller (sportscaster) (born 1965), Canadian sportscaster
- Gord Miller (environmental commissioner) (born 1953), Canadian politician
- Gordon Miller (athlete) (born 1939), British high jumper

== Fictional characters ==
- Gordon Miller (Neighbours)
