= Doris Miller (disambiguation) =

Doris Miller (1919–1943) was a U.S. Navy sailor, awarded the Navy Cross for actions at Pearl Harbor in WWII.

Doris Miller may also refer to:

== People ==
- Doris Ida Miller (born 1939), a Canadian sports biomechanist known for her research in diving
- Doris K. Miller or Doris Koteen Seldin (1922–2015), U.S. psychologist and peace activist
- Dóris Monteiro or Doris Miller (1934–2023), Brazilian singer
- Doris Miller, co-owner of radio station KSMM in Liberal, Kansas

== Characters ==
- Doris Miller, a character from the film Damn Yankees
- Doris Miller, a character from the film Hello, My Name Is Doris

== Other uses ==
- USS Doris Miller, a planned Gerald R. Ford-class U.S. Navy aircraft carrier
- Doris Miller Auditorium, an auditorium in Rosewood Park, Austin, Texas
- Doris Miller Theatre, a theatre in Naval Station Treasure Island, San Francisco, California
- Doris Miller Middle School, a school in San Marcos, Texas

== See also ==
- Doris (disambiguation)
- Miller (surname)
- USS Miller (FF-1091), a U.S. Navy frigate named after "Dorie" Miller
- Doris Miller Memorial, a public art installation in Waco, Texas
