= Roger Millar =

American land use engineer and government official

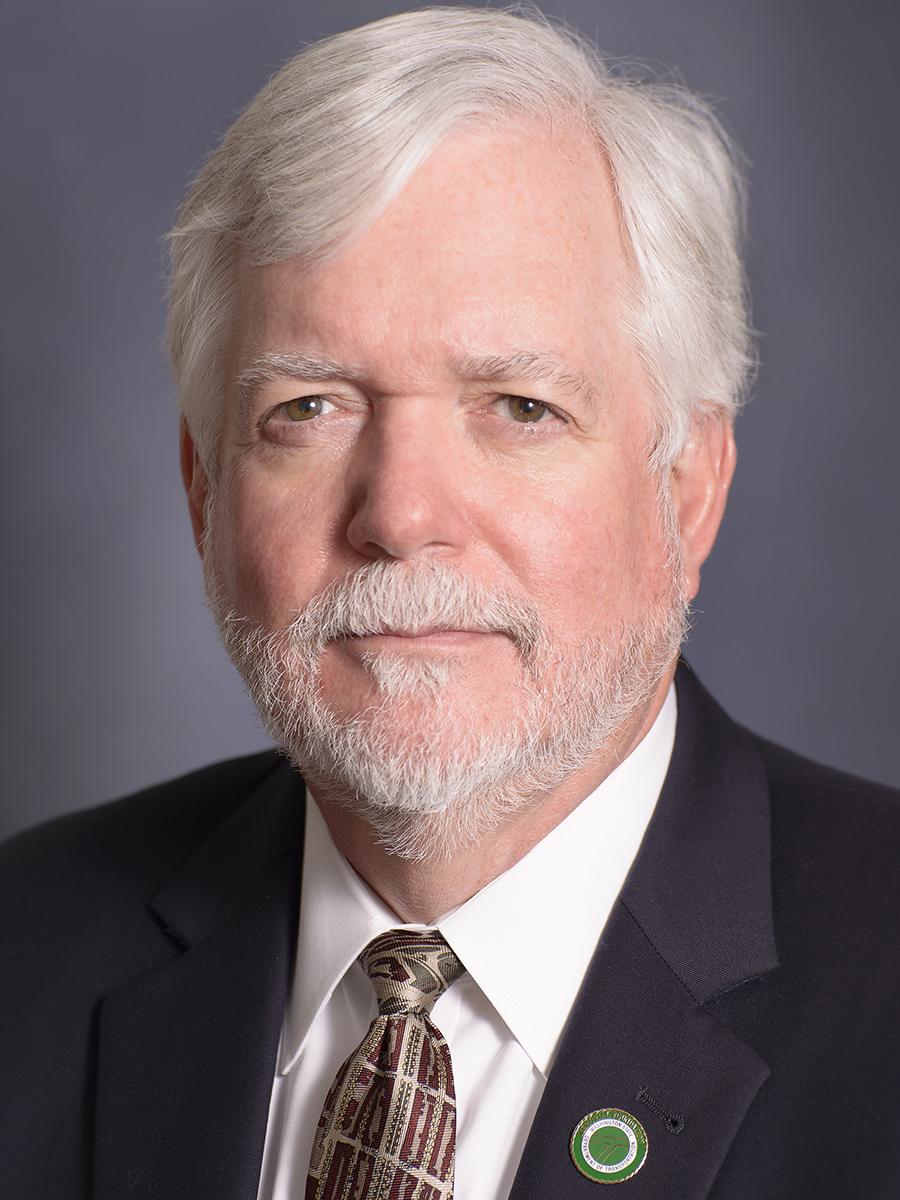

Washington Secretary of Transportation
- Incumbent
- Assumed office August 9, 2016
- Governor: Jay Inslee
- Preceded by: Lynn Peterson

Personal details
- Education: University of Virginia (BS)

Roger Millar is an American land use engineer and government official who served as the Washington Secretary of Transportation.

== Education ==
Millar earned a degree from the University of Virginia, where he earned a Bachelor of Science civil engineering.

== Career ==
Miller has worked as a civil engineer for 38 years, and is a licensed engineer in six states, including Washington. Millar became a Fellow of the American Society of Civil Engineers in 1999. Miller has served in various capacities for the state Departments of Transportation of Florida, Michigan, Minnesota, Oregon, Tennessee, and Vermont.

Millar became Deputy Secretary of the Washington State Department of Transportation in October 2015, and was installed as Acting Secretary after Lynn Peterson, the previous secretary, was removed by the Washington State Senate.

His appointment ends with the election of Bob Ferguson. His last day as transportation secretary is January 15, 2025.
