= Mitchell Miller =

Mitchell Miller may refer to:

- Mitchell Miller (ice hockey) (born 2001), American ice hockey defenseman
- Mitchell Miller (philosopher), American philosopher
- Mitch Miller (1911–2010), American choral conductor
