= Tony Miller (government official) =

Hong Kong civil servant (born 1950)

Tony Miller OBE SBS JP
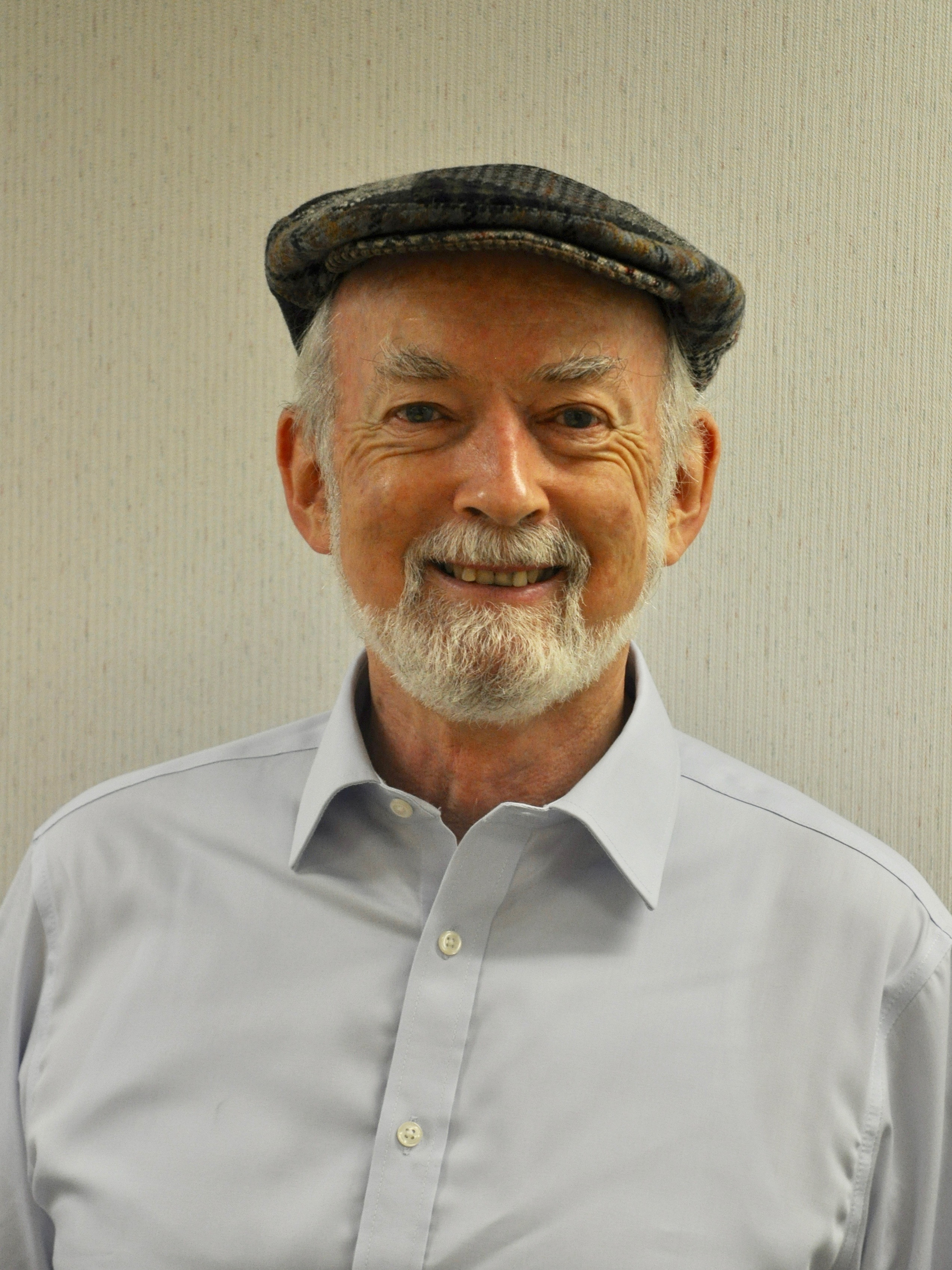
- Tony Miller in 2021
- Born: April 12, 1950 (age 76); Putney, London, United Kingdom
- Education: School of Oriental and African Studies, London University Kennedy School of Government, Harvard University
- Occupations: Author and Art Collector
- Known for: The Missing Buddhas (book)
- Spouse: Wong Nga-ching (黄雅貞) (married 1975)

John Anthony Miller OBE SBS JP (born 12 April 1950) is a former Hong Kong government official and civil servant, author, art collector and historian specialising in Chinese porcelain.

== Early life ==
Miller was born in London in 1950, the first son and third child of seven siblings. Brought up in Bad Oeynhausen, Hanover, West Germany (1950–1953, where his father served at the Headquarters of the British Army of the Rhine) and Tripoli, Libya (1959–1962, where his father headed the British Command Secretariat), Miller's British schooling was at St. Josephs College, Ipswich. He graduated in Arabic from the School of Oriental Studies, London University (1972), and in Public Administration from the Kennedy School of Government, Harvard (1984).

== Career ==
Miller was a prominent Administrative Officer in Hong Kong for thirty-five years from 1972 to 2007, spanning the transfer from British to Chinese sovereignty. In recognition of his contributions to Hong Kong's public administration during the period, Miller was awarded Britain's OBE in 1997, prior to British Hong Kong’s return to Chinese sovereignty, and Hong Kong's Silver Bauhinia Star in 2008, a decade into Chinese administration.

=== Hong Kong Civil Service (1972–2007) ===
Miller's senior roles in the Hong Kong government included Private Secretary to Governor Sir Murray MacLehouse (later Baron) from 1979 to 1982, Government Information Coordinator (1989–91), Director of Marine (1991–93), Director General of Trade (1993–96, when he led Hong Kong’s negotiating team for the close of the Uruguay Round and as Senior Official at APEC), Director of Housing (1996–2002, see controversies below) and Permanent Secretary for Financial Services and the Treasury (2002–04).

From 2004 to 2007 Miller was Hong Kong's Permanent Representative to the World Trade Organization (WTO) in Geneva, Switzerland. While representing Hong Kong in Geneva, Miller chaired the WTO’s Trade Related Intellectual Property Rights Council and the WTO Trade Facilitation Negotiating Group.

=== Hong Kong commercial (post 2008) ===
Miller worked with Sun Hung Kai Properties Group, one of Hong Kong’s largest family-owned listed companies from 2008. This included non-executive Directorships with Transport International Holdings Ltd. (2008–17); Kowloon Motor Bus (1933) Ltd. (2008–17); Long Win Bus Company Ltd. (2008–17), RoadShow Holdings Ltd. (2008–17), SmarTone (2010–present), SUNeVision (2011–13) and Autotoll (2016–present).

Miller was Chairman of the Hong Kong Business Aviation Centre from 2009 to 2016, during which time he urged the Hong Kong government to construct a third runway at Chep Lak Kok airport, and a Director of Hong Kong's Business Environment Council. Miller is a member of the Hong Kong 2047 Foundation and (in 2021) chaired the Hong Kong General Chamber of Commerce's Economic Policy Committee.

== Contributions to the arts ==
Miller and his wife travelled extensively in China after 1979, together visiting every Chinese province at least once. During their visits to China, and in Hong Kong, Miller and his wife acquired a shared interest in visual arts and antiquities, from painting to porcelain. The common themes of Miller’s work are the human side of artistic and technical innovation, the economic and other developments that enable them, and the conversations between cultures that result.

=== Chinese porcelain ===
In 2006, Miller authored a seminal catalogue on Chinese porcelain from the 19th and early 20th century, "Elegance in Relief", which is frequently consulted at art auctions.

Miller has lectured extensively on Chinese porcelain, including for Hong Kong’s Oriental Ceramic Society (of which he is also a former President), Hong Kong's exclusive Min Chiu Society, and the Royal Asiatic Society.

Miller's writings on Chinese porcelain focus on carved porcelain from the Daoguang period, in particular the small group of master craftsmen who signed such desk pieces for wealthy private clients; the origins of delicately pierced porcelain cups and bowls brought to Europe by the Dutch in the early 17th century (which owe their origins to even finer articles produced by private kilns as playthings for Chinese scholar officials); and how Dutch dominance of the porcelain trade in the 17th century was facilitated by their alliance with Fujianese traders and early development of hub-and-spoke logistics.

=== The "Yixian Luohan" terracotta sculptures ===
During the 2010s, Miller became interested in the so-called “Yixian Luohans”, a group of three-colour glaze, life-size terracotta sculptures which first surfaced in China shortly before World War I and are now split between museums in Europe, North America and Japan. In 2021 Miller published The Missing Buddhas, which accounts the discovery of the Luohans and their exodus from China via the German sinologist Friedrich Perzynski.

Miller highlighted discrepancies in the original account of the Luohans' discovery and offered fresh perspectives on their provenance in The Missing Buddhas. He noted:

“As every spy-master, spook and espionage author understands, all good cover stories, or what the late John le Carre called “legends”, rely on verifiable circumstantial facts to camouflage a significant fiction. Perzynski based his legend on a real but fruitless visit to Yixian. The circumstantial details have stood the test of time and, even more recently, have been in large part corroborated by investigations in the field…The significant fiction at the core of his tale is his claim that, while in Yixian, he saw some of the sancai glazed terracotta Luohans. He did not, nor did he find any tangible evidence of them ever having been there.”

== Controversies ==
Following piling problems in some Hong Kong Housing Authority projects during the 1990s, a rare motion of no confidence was tabled in Hong Kong's Legislative Council during 2000 against the authority’s chairman (Rosanna Wong) and Miller, then Director of Housing. The controversy evoked widespread media and academic attention about its impact on the administration of C. H. Tung. Although the motion passed (June, 2000), Hong Kong's then chief secretary, Anson Chan defended both officials and regretted that Rosanna Wong had resigned ahead of the debate in an attempt to head off the crisis:

“…I support the Chief Executive's remarks in this Chamber last Friday. In my view, it would have been much better, and eminently fairer, to allow Ms Wong and Mr Miller to finish the job they started. With Ms Wong's resignation, that will not now be possible. But it remains vitally important to maximise continuity and stability, and for that reason, Mr Miller will remain in his post.”

The controversy triggered a wider debate in Hong Kong about government accountability. This led to Hong Kong's Chief Executive introducing a new tier of appointed Principal Officials (ministers) to oversee career civil servants. Miller continued in government service for eight years after the No Confidence motion and was promoted by the Chief Executive to be one of the Permanent Secretaries supporting the new ministers.

In 2019, Miller joined other prominent Hong Kong former civil servants appeal for a commission of inquiry into Hong Kong's extradition bill saga.

== Personal life ==
Tony Miller married Wong Nga-ching (黄雅貞) in 1975, and they live in Hong Kong. He is a lifelong bilingual speaker of English and Cantonese.

== Works ==
- (2005) "Behind the Golden Cockerel Table Screen – Some Observations on Biscuit Carved Porcelain". Bulletin of the Oriental Ceramic Society of Hong Kong. 13
- (2006) "Elegance in Relief: Carved Porcelain from Jingdezhen of the 19th to Early 20th Centuries" Hong Kong, The Chinese University of Hong Kong. (Catalogue)
- (2006) "Elegance in Relief: Carved Porcelain from Jingdezhen of the 19th to Early 20th Centuries". Arts of Asia. September–October: 110–117 (Journal essay)
- (2015) "A Taste for China – Eastern and Northern Europe in the late 17th and early 18th Centuries". Bulletin of the Oriental Ceramic Society of Hong Kong. 16. Originally delivered as lecture to Oriental Ceramic Society of Hong Kong (21 October 2011)
- (2016) "Linglong. Literati Luxuries of the Late Ming Period". Arts of Asia. January–February: 82–92 Also delivered as lecture in association with Min Chiu Society’s "Radiant Ming" exhibition (1 January 2016)
- (2017) “Jade from Rao: the passing of technical and artistic leadership from imperial to private kilns in the late Ming”. (24 March 2017) (Lecture at Royal Asiatic Society of Hong Kong).
- (2017) "Searching in a Thicket of Bamboo – Imperial Origins of Carved Porcelain of the Daoguang Reign". Bulletin of the Oriental Ceramic Society of Hong Kong. 16.
- (2017) "17th Century Disruptors: The Dutch Rise to Dominance of the Chinese Porcelain Trade". Journal of Ceramics. July–August.
- (2019) "Jiang Qi's Tao Ji". The Oriental Ceramic Society of Hong Kong. (2 May 2019). (Lecture)
