= Chris Miller =

Chris or Christopher Miller may refer to:

== Arts and entertainment ==
- Chris Miller (writer) (born 1942), American comedy author and screenwriter
- Chris Miller (animator) (born 1968), American voice actor and director
- Christopher Robin Miller (born 1969), American actor best known for voicing the title character in the Professor Layton game series
- Christopher Miller (filmmaker) (born 1975), American filmmaker
- Chris J. Miller (born 1983), American actor, writer, director and composer in horror and other genres
- YC (rapper) (Christopher Miller, born 1985), American rapper
- Chris Miller, English lead guitarist in the rock band You Me at Six

== Sports ==
- Chris Miller (quarterback) (born 1965), American football coach and former NFL quarterback
- Chris Miller (wide receiver) (born 1973), American football player
- Chris Miller (cricketer), New Zealand cricketer
- Chris Miller (racing driver) (born 1989), American racing driver

== Other ==
- Christopher J. Miller (1916–?), English academic, head of The Doon School 1966 to 1970
- Chris Miller (politician) (born 1954), American farmer and politician in Illinois
- Christopher C. Miller (born 1965), American politician, former acting Secretary of Defense
- Chris Miller (academic), economic historian, author of Chip War
- Christopher W. Miller, Scottish historian

== See also ==
- Christopher Millar (disambiguation)
