= Daniel Miller =

Daniel Miller may refer to:

- Daniel Miller (anthropologist) (born 1954), anthropologist at University College London
- Daniel Miller (basketball) (born 1991), American professional basketball player
- Daniel Miller (cricketer) (born 1983), cricketer for Surrey County Cricket Club
- Daniel Miller (music producer) (born 1951), also known as The Normal, founder of Mute Records
- Daniel Miller (engineer) (1825–1868), Scottish civil engineer and inventor
- Daniel Miller (politician) (born 1973), president of the Texas Nationalist Movement
- Daniel C. Miller (born 1956), politician in Harrisburg, Pennsylvania
- Daniel F. Miller (1814–1895), U.S. Representative from Iowa
- Daniel H. Miller (died 1846), U.S. Representative from Pennsylvania
- Daniel J. Miller (1924–2006), United States Air Force officer
- Daniel Miller, weekend evening news anchor for WISH-TV Indianapolis
- Daniel Miller, footballer for Preston Lions FC

== In fiction ==
- Daniel Miller, a fictional character from the television series Every Witch Way
- Daniel Miller, a fictional character from the 1996 film Carpool

== See also ==
- Dan Miller (disambiguation)
- Danny Miller (disambiguation)
