= Cody Miller (disambiguation) =

Cody Miller (born 1992) is an American swimmer.

Cody Miller may also refer to:

- Cody Miller (politician) (born 1990), American politician
- Cody Miller (Troy Montero) (born 1971), Filipino-American actor
