= Ally Miller =

Ally Miller may refer to:

- Ally Miller (footballer)
- Ally Miller (rugby union)
