= Colin Miller =

Colin Miller may refer to:

- Colin Miller (cricketer) (born 1964), Australian Test bowler
- Colin Miller (ice hockey, born 1971), Canadian ice hockey player
- Colin Miller (ice hockey, born 1992), Canadian ice hockey player
- Colin Miller (soccer, born 1964), former Canadian soccer player
- Colin Miller (soccer, born 1996), American soccer player
- Colin Miller (musician), American indie rock musician
- Col Miller (politician) (1924–2016), Australian politician
