= Stanley Miller (disambiguation) =

Stanley Miller (1930–2007) was an American chemist.

Stanley or Stan Miller may also refer to:

- Stan Miller (footballer) (1883–1959), English footballer, see List of Oldham Athletic A.F.C. players (25–99 appearances)
- Stan Miller, British motorcyclist, see 1949 Grand Prix motorcycle racing season
- Stanley Mouse (born Stanley Miller in 1940), American artist
