= Patricia Miller =

Patricia Miller may refer to:

- Pat Miller (dog trainer) (born 1951), American dog trainer
- Patricia Miller (Indiana politician) (born 1936), American politician
- Patricia Billie Miller, Connecticut politician
- Patricia Miller (tennis) (born 1972), Uruguayan tennis player
- Patricia H. Miller, American developmental psychologist
- Patricia Cox Miller, American professor of religion
