= Cheryl Miller (activist) =

Medical cannabis rights activist

Cheryl Miller (1946 – June 7, 2003) was a multiple sclerosis patient and medical cannabis rights activist who committed civil disobedience at Congressman Jim Rogan's office and in front of the office of former Georgia Congressman Bob Barr. During Barr's unsuccessful re-election bid, she made a television appearance criticizing his medical cannabis policy. She and her husband received the Peter McWilliams Memorial Award for Outstanding Achievement in Advancing the Cause of Medical Marijuana at the 2003 National NORML Conference. She died on June 7, 2003, from pneumonia and other MS-related complications. Her friends and supporters created the Cheryl Miller Memorial Project (see External Link) to continue her legacy.
