= Genevieve Cruz Miller =

Meteorologist in Guam

Genevieve Cruz Miller is the Meteorologist-in-Charge of the Weather Forecast Office of Guam.

== Life ==
Miller was born and raised in Guam. Her father, Joaquin (Jack) T. Cruz, was a meteorological technician. Miller attended the University of Hawaii at Manoa, graduating in 1987 with a Bachelor of Science degree in meteorology.

In 1988, Miller joined the Weather Service Office in Hilo, Hawaii and two years later became the Developmental Meteorologist at the Weather Service Forecast Office in Honolulu. In 1992 she returned to Guam and worked with Weather Service Office (Aviation) and the Naval Pacific Meteorology and Oceanography Command Detachment (NPMOCD) to provide public, marine and aviation forecasts for Guam and Micronesia. In 2002 she was appointed Meteorologist-in-Charge of the Weather Forecast Office.
