= Dan Miller =

Dan Miller may refer to:

- Dan John Miller, American singer-songwriter for Blanche
- Dan Miller (American football) (born 1960), former American football kicker
- Dan Miller (fighter) (born 1981), welterweight fighter in the Ultimate Fighting Championship
- Dan Miller (Florida politician) (born 1942), former member of the U.S. Congress
- Dan Miller (Pennsylvania politician) (born 1973), member of the Pennsylvania House of Representatives
- Dan Miller (Canadian politician) (born 1944), politician in British Columbia
- Dan Miller (guitarist) (born 1967), member of the backing band for They Might Be Giants, and formerly of Lincoln
- Dan Miller (journalist) (1941–2009), anchorman for TV station WSMV in Nashville
- Dan Miller (sportscaster) (born 1963), radio announcer for the Detroit Lions and Sports Director at WJBK in Detroit
- Dan Miller, editor of Bluegrass Unlimited
- Dan Miller, host of Top Card and 10 Seconds
- Dan Miller (born 1980), singer from O-Town

== In fiction ==
- Dan Miller (The Thick of It), a television character
- Dan Miller, a character in Stephen King novella The Mist

== See also ==
- Daniel Miller (disambiguation)
- Danny Miller (disambiguation)
