= Edwin Miller =

Edwin Miller may refer to:

- Edwin A. Miller (1857–1913), Wisconsin politician
- Edwin E. Miller (1883/1884–1949), New York politician
