= Colleen Miller (disambiguation) =

Colleen Miller (born 1932) is an American retired actress.

Colleen Miller may refer to:

- Coco Miller (born 1978), American basketball player; twin sister of Kelly Miller
- Colleen Miller (rower) (born 1967), Canadian rower
