= Anthony Miller =

Anthony Miller may refer to:

- Anthony Miller (basketball) (born 1971), basketball player
- Anthony Miller (wide receiver, born 1965), American football wide receiver
- Anthony Miller (wide receiver, born 1994), American football wide receiver
- Anthony Miller (murderer) (1941–1960)
- Anthony Miller (Australia), owner of the Big Rocking Horse, Australia
- Anthony W. Miller, former US Deputy Secretary of Education

== See also ==
- Tony Miller (disambiguation)
- Anthony Millar (1934–1993), Irish politician
