= Sean Miller (disambiguation) =

Sean Miller (born 1968) is an American basketball coach.

Sean, Shaun or Shawn Miller may also refer to:

- Sean Miller (South of Nowhere), fictional TV character from South of Nowhere
- Shaun Miller (born 1987), English footballer
- Shawn Miller (American football) (born 1961), former American football player
- Shawn Miller (boxer) (born 1982), American boxer
