= Alice Miller =

Alice Miller may refer to:

- Alice Miller (politician) (born 1939), American politician in the state of Vermont
- Alice Miller (psychologist) (1923–2010), Polish-born Swiss psychologist
- Alice Miller (golfer) (born 1956), American golfer
- Alice Miller (pilot), Israeli who successfully petitioned for the Israeli Air Force pilot course to be opened to women
- Alice Duer Miller (1874–1942), American writer and poet
- Alice D. G. Miller (1894–1985), American screenwriter
- Alice L. Miller (born 1944), researcher, writer, and professor

== See also ==
- Alice Miller School, an Australian school founded by author John Marsden
- Alyce Miller, American writer
- Allison Miller (disambiguation)
