= Russell A. Miller =

American lawyer and academic

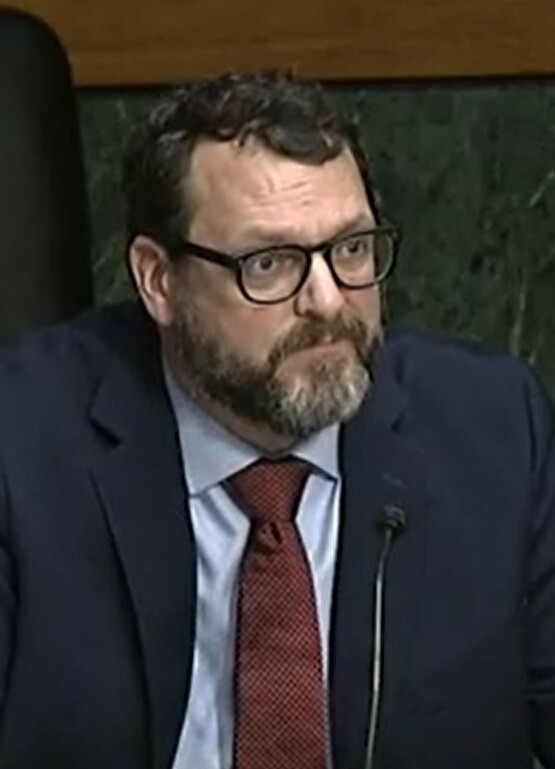
- Miller in 2020
- Born: 1969 (age 56–57)
- Education: Washington State University; Duke University

Russell A. Miller (born 1969) is an American lawyer, professor, author and editor.

Miller grew up in the small towns of Priest River, Idaho and Salmon, Idaho and then went to Washington State University to study English literature. There he graduated in 1991 with the grade cum laude. In 1994, he received his Juris Doctor (J.D. degree in law) and a Master of Arts degree from Duke University in Durham, North Carolina.

From 1999 to 2000 Miller was a fellow of the Robert Bosch Foundation. In 2002 he obtained the LLM (Master of Laws) at the Goethe University in Frankfurt am Main. He worked as a trainee at the Federal Constitutional Court in Karlsruhe and at the European Court of Human Rights in Strasbourg until 2002.

After his studies, Miller worked at the United States District Court for the Eastern District of Washington and then as a lecturer at the University of Idaho in Moscow (Idaho). In 2008 he was appointed to the law school of the private Washington and Lee University in Lexington, Virginia. There he teaches comparative legal theories and methods, comparative constitutional law, international public law and German law. Miller is the first one who has the J.B. Stombock Professorship in Law.

In the winter semester 2009/2010 Miller received a residency and research grant as part of the Fulbright Program for the Max Planck Institute for Comparative Public Law and International Law in Heidelberg. He is the founder and editor of the German Law Journal, founded in 1999, and was appointed a Fellow in the Competence Network for Civil Security Law in Europe at the University of Freiburg in 2013.

In 2020, the Jury faculty of the University of Münster awarded him a Humboldt Prize.

== Publications ==
Miller is known for his articles in Los Angeles Times, FAZ, Der Spiegel and other newspapers and magazines. His books include The Constitutional Jurisprudence of the Federal Republic of Germany, published in 2012 together with Donald P. Kommers (political scientist, 1932–2018), the third edition of which was published in 2012 by Duke University Press.

- einspruch.FAZ.net:
  - Let the law decide
  - Doubts about the Transatlantic Relationship? Let the Law Decide!
  - Law's Labor Lost?
- Panel Presentation at CATO Policy Forum (Washington, April 18, 2018): What Europe Can Teach the United States about Free Speech
