= Jeffrey Alan Miller =

American scholar

- Education: Princeton University (A.B.), 2006); University of Oxford (M.St., 2007); University of Oxford (D.Phil, 2012)

Jeffrey Alan Miller is an American literary scholar. He is an associate professor of English at Montclair State University, specializing in the study of early modern literature, history, and theology, with a particular focus on the works of John Milton and his contemporaries.

In 2015, he discovered the earliest known draft of the King James Bible while researching at Sidney Sussex College, Cambridge.

== Awards ==
In 2018, he was awarded a National Endowment for the Humanities Fellowship to support a full year of dedicated work to complete a book-length critical edition and study of the earliest known draft of part of the King James Bible. In 2019, he was awarded a MacArthur Fellowship.
