= Terry Miller =

Terry Miller may refer to:

- Terry Miller (running back) (born 1956), American retired football running back
- Terry Miller (linebacker) (born 1946), American retired football linebacker
- Terry Miller (politician) (1942–1989), American politician, Lieutenant Governor of Alaska, 1978–1982
- Terry Miller (engineer) (1909–1989), British railway engineer
- Terry Miller (water polo) (1932–2014), British Olympic water polo player
