= Neil Miller =

Neil Miller may refer to:

- Neil Miller (writer) (born 1945), American researcher of LGBT history
- Neil Miller (EastEnders), minor character in the show EastEnders
- Neil J. Miller (1929–2025), American politician from Idaho
- Neil R. Miller, American neuro-ophthalmologist

== See also ==
- Neal E. Miller (1909–2002), American psychologist
