= Eugene Miller =

Eugene Miller may refer to:

- Eugene Miller (Texas politician), in Texas Senate, District 22
- Eugene Miller (Ohio politician), member of Cleveland City Council and former member of the Ohio House of Representatives

== See also ==
- Yevgeny Miller (1867–1939), Russian general
- Gene Miller (1928–2005), reporter
