= Judith Miller (disambiguation) =

Judith Miller (born 1948) is an American journalist.

Judith Miller may also refer to:

- Judith Miller (philosopher) (1941–2017), French philosopher
- Judith Miller (antiques expert) (1951–2023), British television presenter and writer
- Judith A. Miller (born 1950), American lawyer and government official
- Judy Miller, a character on TV series Still Standing
- Judy Hoback Miller (born 1937), American woman known for her involvement in the Watergate scandal
- Judith Miller (1962–1977), teenage homicide victim, the second victim of the Hillside Stranglers
