= Aaron Miller =

Aaron Miller may refer to:

- Aaron Miller (ice hockey) (born 1971), ice hockey player
- Aaron E. Miller, American neurologist
- Aaron David Miller (born 1949), American Middle East analyst and author
- Aaron Miller (politician) (born 1987), member of the Michigan House of Representatives
- Aaron Miller (baseball), pitcher
