= Christian B. Miller =

American philosopher

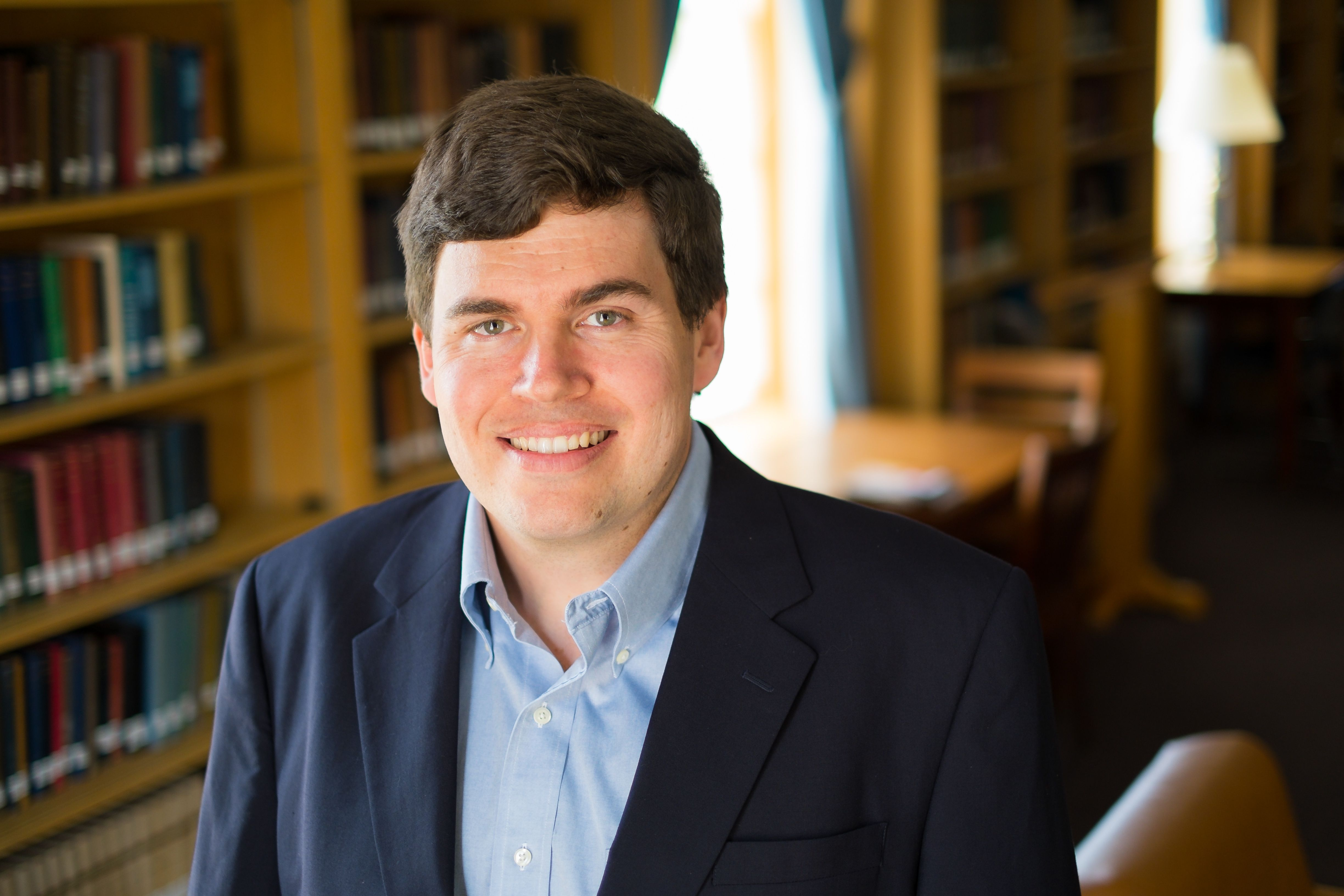
- Miller, photographed in 2013
- Writing career
- Subject: Philosophy
- Website: college.wfu.edu/philosophy/miller

Christian B. Miller is an American philosopher specializing in ethics and philosophy of religion. He is the A.C. Reid Professor of Philosophy at Wake Forest University.

== Education and career ==
Miller earned his B.A. at Princeton University and his Ph.D. at the University of Notre Dame. He has taught at Wake Forest University since 2004. Miller has written five books, edited five books, and published over 125 articles, introductions and commentaries.

From 2010 to 2015 he was the director of the Character Project, funded by $5.6 million in grants from the John Templeton Foundation and the Templeton World Charity Foundation. The project examined character from the disciplines of philosophy, theology, and psychology, and supported the work of dozens of scholars around the world.

From 2015 to 2018, he was the philosophy director of the Beacon Project, funded by a $3.9 million grant from the Templeton Religion Trust. The project examined the morally exceptional from the disciples of philosophy, theology, and psychology.

From 2018 to 2023, he is the director of the Honesty Project, funded by grants totaling $4.6 million from the John Templeton Foundation. The project examines the virtue of honesty from the perspectives of philosophy and the empirical study of honesty.

Miller is a regular contributor to Forbes. He has also written for the New York Times, Wall Street Journal, Dallas Morning News, Aeon, Christianity Today, and many other places.

Miller has been awarded the 2014 Kulynych Family Omicron Delta Kappa Award for Student Engagement, the 2009 Wake Forest University Reid-Doyle Prize for Excellence in Teaching and the 2009 Wake Forest University Award for Excellence in Research.

== Books ==
- Honesty: The Philosophy and Psychology of a Neglected Virtue. Oxford: Oxford University Press, forthcoming.
- Moral Psychology. Cambridge: Cambridge University Press, forthcoming.
- The Character Gap: How Good Are We? New York: Oxford University Press, 2017.
- Character and Moral Psychology. Oxford: Oxford University Press, 2014. 288 pages.
- Moral Character: An Empirical Theory. Oxford: Oxford University Press, 2013. 368 pages.
- Integrity, Honesty, and Truth-Seeking. Ed. Christian B. Miller and Ryan West. New York: Oxford University Press, 2020.
- Moral Psychology, Volume V: Virtue and Character. Ed. Walter Sinnott-Armstrong and Christian B. Miller. Cambridge: MIT Press, 2017.
- Character: New Directions from Philosophy, Psychology, and Theology. Ed. Christian Miller, R. Michael Furr, Angela Knobel, and William Fleeson. New York: Oxford University Press, 2015.
- The Continuum Companion to Ethics. Ed. Christian Miller. London: Continuum Press, 2011. 355 Pages. Paperback Edition: The Bloomsbury Companion to Ethics, 2014.
- Phillip Quinn. Essays in the Philosophy of Religion. Ed. Christian Miller. Oxford: Oxford University Press, 2006. 328 pages.
