= Marie Miller (disambiguation) =

Marie Miller (born 1989) is an American musician.

Marie Miller may also refer to:

- Marie Miller (dancer) (1770–1833), French ballet dancer
- Marie-Chantal Miller, now Marie-Chantal, Crown Princess of Greece (born 1968), British-born Crown Princess of Greece
- Marie-Paule Miller (born 1968), French former female deaf sprinter and heptathlete
