= Ben Miller (disambiguation) =

Ben Miller (born 1966) is an English comedian and actor.

Ben or Benjamin Miller may also refer to:

- Ben Miller, better known by his stage name Wrekonize, British-American rapper, member of hip-hop group ¡Mayday!
- Ben Miller (musician), American guitarist
- Ben Miller (footballer), Australian rules footballer
- Benjamin Miller (figure skater) (born 1983), American figure skater
- Benjamin M. Miller (1864–1944), American politician
- Benjamin K. Miller (judge) (1936–2024), justice of the Illinois Supreme Court
- Benjamin Kurtz Miller (1857–1928), philatelist, donated the Benjamin Miller Collection to the New York Public Library
- Benjamin Miller (scientist), American scientist

== See also ==
- Ben Millers, a U.S. soccer club
