= Ralph Miller (disambiguation) =

Ralph Miller (1919–2001) was an American basketball coach.

Ralph Miller is also the name of:

- Ralph Miller (alpine skier) (1933–2021), American Olympic skier
- Ralph Miller (right-handed pitcher) (1873–1973), 19th century baseball player
- Ralph Miller (third baseman) (1896–1939), Major League Baseball third baseman
- Ralph Miller (left-handed pitcher) (1899–1967), Major League Baseball pitcher
- Brad Miller (politician) (Ralph Bradley Miller, born 1953), U.S. Representative from North Carolina
- Ralph Miller (footballer) (1941–2014), English football (soccer) player
- Ralph Willett Miller (1762–1799), Royal Navy captain
- Ralph Miller (American football) (born 1948), American football player
- Ralph Edward Miller (1915–1999), American football player
- Ralph Miller, inventor of the Miller cycle for internal combustion engines
