= Percy Miller =

Percy Miller may refer to:

- Master P (Percy Robert Miller, born 1970), American rapper, actor and businessman
- Romeo Miller (Percy Romeo Miller, born 1989), American rapper, actor and television personality
- Percy Miller (pitcher) (1897–1958), American Negro leagues baseball player
- Percy A. Miller Jr. (1899–1984), Speaker of the New Jersey General Assembly
- Percy Miller, Jr. (1931–2003), American minor league baseball player
