= Kate Miller =

Kate Miller may refer to

- Kate Miller (diver) (born 2005), Canadian diver
- Kate Miller (politician), American politician
- Kate Miller-Heidke (born 1981), Australian singer-songwriter
