= Hugh Miller (disambiguation) =

Hugh Miller (1802–1856) was a Scottish geologist and writer

Hugh Miller may also refer to:

- Hugh Miller (Medal of Honor) (1859–?), American sailor and Medal of Honor recipient
- Hugh Miller the younger (1850–1896), Scottish geologist
- Hughie Miller (1886–1945), American baseball player
- Hugh Miller (actor) (1889–1976), British film actor
- Hugh Miller (cinematographer), Australian cinematographer, on the 2021 film Under the Volcano
- Hugh Graham Miller (1939–2019), British academic
- Hugh B. Miller (1910–1978), American sailor
- Hugh R. Miller (1812–1863), American politician
- Hugh Thomas Miller (1867–1947), Lieutenant Governor of Indiana

== See also ==
- Hugh Millar (1921–1975), Canadian ice hockey player
- Hughmilleria, an extinct genus of arthropod named after Hugh Miller (1802–1856)
