= Lloyd Miller =

Lloyd Miller may refer to:

- Lloyd Miller (musician) (1938–2024), American musician
- Lloyd Miller (athlete) (1915–1985), Australian athlete
- Lloyd Tevis Miller (1872–1951), American physician
