= Jodi Miller (disambiguation) =

Jodi Miller (born 1971) is an American stand-up comedian, writer, actress and author.

Jodi or Jody Miller may also refer to:

- Jodi Leigh Miller (born 1972), American bodybuilder
- Jody Miller (1941–2022), American country singer
- Jody Miller (criminologist) (born 1966), American criminologist
