= The Taste of New Wine =

- First edition
- Author: Keith Miller
- Publication date: 1965
- Publication place: United States
- Followed by: A Second Touch

The Taste of New Wine is the first book published by Christian writer Keith Miller in 1965 with a foreword by Elton Trueblood.

Largely autobiographical, it portrays his struggle to find a meaningful faith, and evolves from it principles for revitalizing the Christian church.

Greg Ogden considers the book to be a foundational document in the revival of the small group movement within the church.

First published in 1965, it is still in print in both paperback and hard cover. Miller followed The Taste of New Wine with a sequel, A Second Touch, followed by Habitation of Dragons, and subsequently authored or co-authored more than twenty other books, and became a noted speaker.

Keith Miller was born in Tulsa, Oklahoma on April 19, 1927. He died from pancreatic cancer on January 22, 2012 in Austin, Texas at the age of 84.
