= Kelly Miller =

Kelly Miller may refer to:

- Kelly Miller (basketball) (born 1978), American WNBA player
- Kelly Miller (ice hockey, born 1963), American former NHL player
- Kelly Miller (scholar) (1863–1939), American mathematician, sociologist and journalist who had a long career at Howard University
- Kelly Miller (actress), Betsy in George of the Jungle (film) (1997)
