= Adam Miller (painter) =

American painter

Adam Miller (born 1979 in Eugene, Oregon), is an American painter based in New York. He is known for his large-scale paintings inspired by baroque and mannerist art. He studied at the Florence Academy of Art, Michal John Angel Studios, Art Students League of New York and the Grand Central Academy of Art.

In 2017 he unveiled a monumental painting named Quebec, which depicts prominent people from the history of Quebec and Canada. It was commissioned by the Montreal businessman Salvatore Guerrera.
