= Heath Miller (disambiguation) =

Heath Miller (born 1982) is an American football player.

Heath Miller may also refer to:

- Heath Miller (promoter), American concert promoter
- Heath Miller (actor) (born 1980), Australian actor
- Heath Slater (Heath Wallace Miller, born 1983), American professional wrestler
