= Aubrey Miller =

Aubrey Miller may refer to:

- Aubrey K. Miller, American actress
- Aubrey Miller Jr. (born 1999), American football linebacker
