= Eric Lawrence Miller =

Eric Lawrence Miller from Tufts University was named Fellow of the Institute of Electrical and Electronics Engineers (IEEE) in 2012 for contributions to inverse problems and physics-based signal and image processing.
