= Brad Miller =

Brad Miller or Bradley Miller may refer to:

- Brad Miller (baseball) (born 1989), American baseball player
- Brad Miller (basketball) (born 1976), American basketball player
- Brad Miller (politician) (born 1953), American politician and attorney
- Brad Miller (footballer) (born 1983), Australian rules footballer
- Brad Miller (ice hockey) (born 1969), Canadian ice hockey player
- Brad Miller (chef) (born 1981), American chef and television personality
- Bradley W. Miller, Canadian jurist
- Johnny Ringo (musician) (Bradley Miller, 1961–2005), Jamaican reggae deejay
