= Glenn Miller (disambiguation) =

Glenn Miller (1904–1944) was a swing-era American jazz musician.

Glenn Miller may also refer to:

- Frazier Glenn Miller, Jr. (1940–2021), commonly known as Glenn Miller, white nationalist, perennial candidate, and convicted murderer
- Glenn Wise (1896–1991), née Glenn Miller, first woman to serve as Secretary of State of Wisconsin
- Glenn Miller (rugby league) (born 1964), Australian rugby league player
- Glenn Miller, Canadian Bassist and former member of Chilliwack

Glen Miller may refer to:

- Glen Miller (basketball) (born 1963), formerly of University of Pennsylvania and Brown University
- A small unincorporated village in Quinte West, Ontario, Canada

== See also ==
- Glenn Miller (album), a 1945 album by Glenn Miller and His Orchestra
- The Glenn Miller Story, a 1954 film about jazz musician Glenn Miller's life
