= Earl Miller =

Earl Miller may refer to:

- Earl Miller (bodyguard) (1897–1973), bodyguard to future US First Lady Eleanor Roosevelt
- Earl Miller (ice hockey) (1905–1936), Canadian ice hockey player
- Earl K. Miller (born 1962), American neuroscientist
- Earl R. Miller (born 1958), American diplomat
- Earl Heath Miller (born 1982), American football player

== See also ==
- Earl Burns Miller Japanese Garden in Long Beach, California
