= Linda Miller =

Linda Miller may refer to:

- Linda Miller (politician) (born 1947), member of the Iowa House of Representatives
- Linda Lael Miller (born 1949), American romance novelist
- Linda Miller (actress) (born 1942), American film and television actress
- Taylor Miller (Linda Taylor Miller, born 1953), American soap opera actress
- Linda Miller (engineer), American civil engineer
- Linda Miller (rower) (born 1972), American Olympic rower
- Linda Jo Miller, Actress known for King Kong Escapes
