= Louise Miller =

Louise Miller may refer to:

- C. Louise Miller (born 1936), American politician
- Louise Miller (athlete) (born 1960), English high jumper
- Louise Klein Miller (1854–1943), American architect
