= Susan Cummins Miller =

American author of mystery novels (born 1949)

- Born: 1949 (age 76–77); Southern California, U.S.
- Occupation: Author
- Writing career
- Genre: Mystery fiction

Susan Cummins Miller (born 1949) is an American author of mystery novels.

== Career ==
Miller was born and raised in Southern California and lives in Tucson, Arizona. Before writing full-time, she worked for the United States government (primarily with the U.S. Geological Survey), conducting fieldwork in California, Nevada, Idaho, and Utah. She subsequently taught introductory geology and oceanography at the college level and offered short courses in writing, geology, paleontology, and oceanography in Tucson area schools. Miller is a Research Affiliate of the University of Arizona's Southwest Institute for Research on Women and a SIROW Scholar. Her poetry has appeared in Sandcutters: Journal of the Arizona Poetry Society; Oasis Journal (2003–2008); and the anthology What Wilderness Is This: Women Write About the Southwest (University of Texas-Austin Press, 2007). Miller's mysteries and nonfiction have been published by Texas Tech University Press.

== Publications ==
=== The Frankie MacFarlane Mystery Series ===
The series takes place throughout the Southwest and California. It features Frankie MacFarlane, a field geologist and professor whose researches force her to play the role of geosleuth as well as scientist.

- Death Assemblage (2002)
- Detachment Fault (2004)
- Quarry (2006)
- Hoodoo (2008)
- Fracture (2011)

=== Nonfiction ===
- A Sweet, Separate Intimacy: Women Writers of the American Frontier, 1800–1922 University of Utah Press, (2000); revised edition, Texas Tech University Press, (2007).
