= Todd Miller =

Todd Miller may refer to:

- Todd Miller (media executive), American media executive
- Todd Miller (journalist), American journalist
- Todd Miller (rugby union) (born 1974), New Zealand rugby player
- Todd Miller (soccer) (born 1973), American soccer midfielder
- Todd Miller (footballer) (born 2002), English footballer
- Todd Douglas Miller, American documentary director, editor and producer
- T.J. Miller (born 1981), American actor, director, writer, singer, voice artist, and comedian

== See also ==
- Matthew Todd Miller (born 1989), American teacher
