= Gerrit Miller (disambiguation) =

Gerrit Miller may refer to:

- Gerrit Smith Miller (1845–1937), American businessman, farmer, sportsman and politician
- Gerrit Smith Miller Jr. (1869–1956), American zoologist
