= Nellie Miller (disambiguation) =

Nellie Miller (born 1988) is an American barrel racer.

Nellie Miller may also refer to:

- Nellie Burget Miller (1875–1952), American poet, writer, clubwoman, and lecturer
- Nellie Miller-Mann (1897–1997), American missionary
