= Nate Miller =

Nate Miller may refer to:

- Nate Miller (boxer) (born 1963), American boxer
- Nate Miller (basketball) (1987–2022), American basketball player
- Nate Miller (defensive back) (born 1958), American football player
- Nate Miller (offensive lineman) (born 1971), American football player
- Nate Miller (soccer) (born 1987), American soccer coach
- Nate Miller in List of The 100 characters

== See also ==
- Nathan Miller (disambiguation)
