= Herman Miller (disambiguation) =

Herman Miller is a brand of MillerKnoll, Inc., an American manufacturer of office furniture and equipment.

Herman Miller may also refer to:

- Herman Miller (politician) (1833–1922), American politician and businessman in Wisconsin
- Herman Miller (writer) (1919–1999), Hollywood writer and producer
