= Jan Miller =

Jan Miller may refer to:

- Jan Miller (actress), British film and TV actress of the 1950s and 1960s
- Jan Miller (squash player), Australian squash player, won the Australian Open in 1985
- Jan D. Miller (born 1942), American engineer
