= Danny Miller (radio producer) =

American radio producer

Daniel Miller is a former executive producer of Fresh Air, an interview-format radio program produced by WHYY-FM in Philadelphia and distributed throughout the United States by National Public Radio. He began working on the program in 1978, becoming the senior producer in 1987, and retiring in 2026."'Fresh Air' staff bids farewell to longtime executive producer Danny Miller". February 12, 2026. Prior to working on Fresh Air, he was a film student at Temple University and taught music therapy.
