= Joshua Miller =

Joshua or Josh Miller may refer to:

== Musicians ==
- Joshua Miller, American musician with duo Nemesis also featured in Jacob and Joshua: Nemesis Rising
- Josh Miller, musician with The Pappy Johns Band
- Josh Miller, drummer for Chelsea Grin, former drummer for Emmure and Spite, multi-instrumentalist for Darko US

== Sportsmen ==
- Josh Miller (field hockey) in 2013 Sultan Azlan Shah Cup
- Josh Miller (punter) (born 1970), American football punter
- Josh Miller (baseball) (born 1978), American baseball coach
- Josh Miller (cornerback) (born 1996), American gridiron football player
- Josh Miller (rugby league) (born 1983), Australian rugby league footballer

== Politicians ==
- Joshua Miller (Rhode Island politician) (born 1954), member of the Rhode Island Senate
- Joshua Miller (Iowa politician) (1822–1886), member of the Iowa Senate
- Josh Miller (Arkansas politician) (born 1981), member of the Arkansas House of Representatives

== Others ==
- Joshua John Miller (born 1974), American actor
- Josh Miller (education) (born 1990), American technology executive, director of product for the White House
- Josh Miller (filmmaker) (born 1978), or Worm Miller, American writer, director, and actor
- Joshua Miller (psychologist), psychology professor at the University of Georgia
