= Eric J. Miller =

Eric John Miller
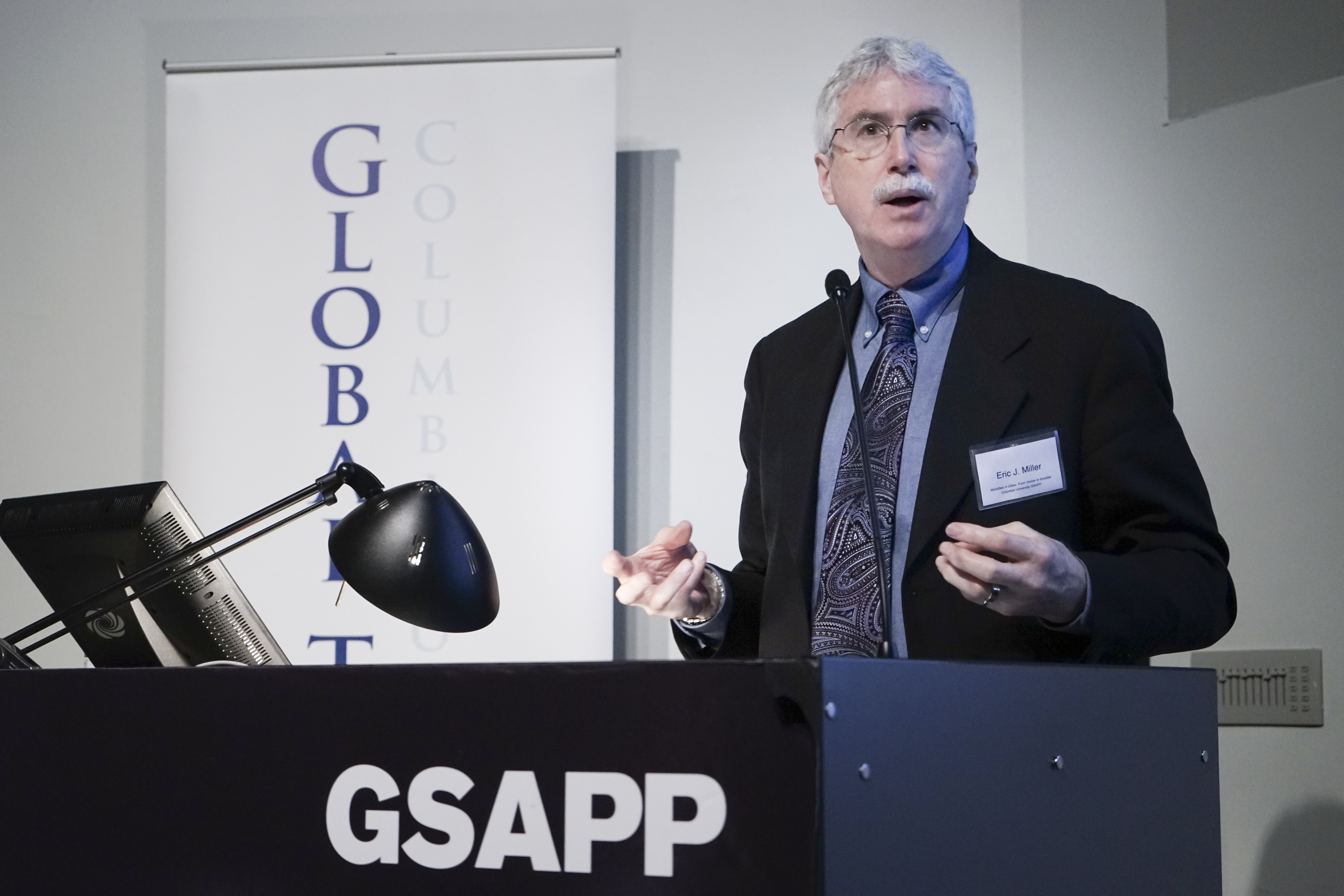
- Occupation: Professor

Eric J. Miller (born June 9, 1951, in Fort Erie, Ontario) is Professor of Civil Engineering at the University of Toronto's Department of Civil & Mineral Engineering and Director of the University of Toronto Transportation Research Institute (UTTRI). His main research areas include microsimulation of Urban Transportation - Land-Use Systems, Sustainability of Urban Transportation Systems, and Improvements in Conventional Travel Demand Models.

== Early life and education ==
Miller received a bachelor's degree in engineering science from the University of Toronto in 1973, a master's degree in aerospace studies from the same university in 1975, and a PhD in civil engineering (Transportation Systems) in 1978 from the Massachusetts Institute of Technology. After a brief position at McMaster University, he joined the University of Toronto faculty in 1979.
