= Margaret Miller =

Margaret Miller or Maggie Miller may refer to:

- Margaret Carnegie Miller (1897–1990), American and philanthropist
- Margaret C. Miller, Canadian archaeologist
- Margaret Miller (politician), Canadian politician
- Margaret Stevenson Miller, (1896–1979) British lecturer and researcher
- Maggie Miller (mathematician)
- Peggy Miller, see Tales of the Riverbank

== See also ==
- Margaret Millar (disambiguation)
