= Philip Miller (disambiguation) =

Philip Miller (1691–1771) was an English botanist.

Philip or Phil Miller may also refer to:

- Philip Miller (composer) (born 1964), South African composer
- Philip R. Miller (1918–1989), judge of the United States Court of Federal Claims
- Phil Miller (1949–2017), English guitarist
- Phil Miller (American football) (born c. 1933), American football coach
- Phil Miller (politician) (born c. 1952), American politician in the Iowa House of Representatives
- Phil Miller (The Last Man on Earth), a character on The Last Man on Earth
