= Dean Miller (disambiguation) =

Dean Miller (born 1965) is an American country music artist, son of Roger Miller.

Dean Miller may also refer to:

- Dean Miller (athlete) (born 1989), English Paralympic athlete
- Dean A. Miller (1931–2018), American historian
