= Geoffrey Miller (cricketer, born 1937) =

English cricketer

Personal information
- Full name: Geoffrey Vernon Miller
- Born: 18 August 1937 (age 89); Walsall, Staffordshire, England
- Batting: Right-handed
- Bowling: Right-arm off break

Domestic team information
- Years: Team
- 1981–1986: Cambridgeshire

Career statistics
Competition	LA
Matches	3
Runs scored	30
Batting average	10.00
100s/50s	–/–
Top score	21
Balls bowled	–
Wickets	–
Bowling average	–
5 wickets in innings	–
10 wickets in match	–
Best bowling	–
Catches/stumpings	1/–
- Source: Cricinfo, 19 July 2010

Geoffrey Vernon Miller (born 18 August 1937) is a former English cricketer. Miller was a right-handed batsman who bowled right-arm off break. He was born at Walsall, Staffordshire.

Miller made his debut for Cambridgeshire in the 1981 Minor Counties Championship against Lincolnshire. From 1981 to 1986, he represented the county in 54 Minor Counties Championship matches. Miller also played 5 MCCA Knockout Trophy matches for the county between 1983 and 1986.

Miller also played 3 List-A matches for Cambridgeshire, with his first coming against Warwickshire in the 1983 NatWest Trophy. His final List-A match came in the 1986 NatWest Trophy against Yorkshire. In his 3 List-A matches, he scored 30 runs at a batting average of 10.00, with a high score of 21.
