= Jason Miller =

Jason Miller may refer to:

- Jason Miller (baseball) (born 1982), American baseball player
- Jason Miller (communications strategist) (born c. 1974), American political and communications strategist
- Jason Miller (government official), Chief Performance Officer of the United States
- Jason Miller (fighter) (born 1980), American mixed martial arts fighter
- Jason Miller (ice hockey) (born 1971), Canadian ice hockey player
- Jason Miller (musician), American drummer from Pittsburgh, Pennsylvania
- Jason Miller (playwright) (1939–2001), American playwright and actor, known for The Exorcist
- Jason C. Miller (born 1972), American heavy metal musician
- Jason P. Miller (born 1983), American mathematician
- Jason Miller, a superhero character in the comic book series Rising Stars
