= Ian Miller =

Ian Miller may refer to:

== Sports ==
- Ian Miller (Australian footballer) (1949–2026), Australian rules footballer
- Ian Miller (footballer, born 1955), Scottish footballer
- Ian Miller (footballer, born 1983), English footballer
- Ian Miller (basketball) (born 1991), American basketball player
- Ian Miller (baseball) (born 1992), baseball player

== Others ==
- Ian Miller (illustrator) (born 1946), British fantasy illustrator
- Ian Miller, former member of the band Virgin Black
- Ian Miller, co-founder of Miller's Retail
- Ian Miller, one of the writers of the 2023 science-fiction comedy-drama Monsters of California
- Ian Miller, a character in the film My Big Fat Greek Wedding

== See also ==
- Ian Millar (born 1947), Canadian show jumper
