= Lee Miller (disambiguation) =

Lee Miller (1907–1977) was an American photographer.

Lee Miller or Millar is also the name of:

- Lee Miller (footballer) (born 1983), Scottish footballer
- Lee Thomas Miller, American country songwriter
- Lee Millar, voice of Pluto, in Mr. Mouse Takes a Trip etc.
- Lee Miller (actor), American actor

== See also ==
- Leigh Miller (disambiguation)
- Lee (2023 film) biographical war drama film, adapted from the biography “The Lives of Lee Miller”
