= Dorothy Miller (disambiguation) =

Dorothy or Dottie Miller may refer to:

- Dorothy Miller (1920–2008), American politician
- Dorothy Canning Miller (1904–2003), American art curator
- Dottie Leonard Miller (1945–2024), American business executive
- Dorothy Lonewolf Miller (1920–2003), Blackfoot activist
