= The Miller Sisters =

The Miller Sisters may refer to:

- The Miller Sisters (singers), a country swing duo of the 1950s.
- The Miller Sisters (socialites), a trio of sisters, Pia, Marie-Chantal, and Alexandra all of whom married very well in the late twentieth century. They are the daughters of Robert Warren Miller.
