= Walter Miller =

Wally, Walt, or Walter Miller may refer to:

== Film and television ==
- Walt Miller, a character in the TV series New Girl
- Walter Miller (actor) (1892–1940), American film actor
- Walter C. Miller (1926–2020), American television director and producer

== Politicians ==
- Walter Dale Miller (1925–2015), American politician
- Walter L. Miller (politician) (1830–?), New Brunswick-born Wisconsin politician

== Sportspeople ==
- Wally Miller (1917–1992), Australian footballer
- Walt Miller (basketball) (1915–2001), American basketball player
- Walt Miller (baseball) (1883–1956), American baseball pitcher
- Walter Miller (American football), American football coach in the United States
- Walter Miller (footballer) (1882–1928), English footballer
- Walter Miller (ice hockey) (1887–1959), Canadian ice hockey player
- Walter Miller (jockey) (1890–1959), American Hall of Fame jockey
- Walter Miller (rugby league), rugby league footballer of the 1910s for New Zealand, and Wellington
- Walter Miller (wrestler), Australian middleweight wrestling champion
- Jake Miller (pitcher) (Walter Miller, 1898–1975), American baseball pitcher

== Other ==
- Walter Miller (philologist) (1864–1949), American classical linguistics scholar
- Walter B. Miller (1920–2004), American anthropologist
- Walter James Miller (1918–2010), American literary critic, playwright, poet, and translator
- Walter L. Miller (endocrinologist), American endocrinologist and professor of pediatrics
- Walter Lee Miller Jr., United States Marine Corps officer
- Walter M. Miller Jr. (1923–1996), American science fiction author
- Walter R. Miller (1872–1952), British missionary

== See also ==
- Walter Millar (fl. 1980s–2010s), unionist politician in Northern Ireland
