= Warren Miller =

Warren Miller may refer to:

- Warren Miller (West Virginia politician) (1847–1920), American politician from West Virginia
- Warren Miller (baseball) (1885–1956), outfielder in Major League Baseball
- Warren Miller (author) (1921–1966), American writer
- Warren Miller (political scientist) (1924–1999), American political scientist
- Warren Miller (director) (1924–2018), American ski and snowboarding filmmaker
- Warren Miller (ice hockey) (born 1954), American ice hockey player
- Warren E. Miller (born 1964), Maryland politician
- Warren L. Miller (fl. 1980s–2010s), former chairman of the U.S. Commission for the Preservation of America's Heritage Abroad
- Warren F. Miller Jr. (born 1943), American nuclear engineer and government official
- Warren Hastings Miller (1878–1960), American editor and author
- Wes Miller (Warren Weston Miller; born 1983), American basketball coach and player
- Warren Miller (Vermont politician) (fl. 2000s), member of the Vermont House of Representatives, 2005–2006 session
- Warren H. Miller (fl. 1910s), managing editor of Field & Stream, 1910–1918
