= Joe Miller (footballer, born 1899) =

Irish footballer

Personal information
- Full name: Joseph Miller
- Date of birth: 27 April 1899
- Place of birth: Coleraine, Ireland
- Position: Wing-half

Senior career*
Years	Team	Apps	(Gls)
1918–1919	Largs Thistle		
1919–1920	Port Glasgow Athletic		
1920–1922	Morton		
1922	→ Arthurlie (loan)		
1923–1924	Johnstone		
1924–1925	Nuneaton Town		
1925–1926	Aberdare Athletic	37	(4)
1926–1930	Middlesbrough	140	(0)
1930	Dolphin		
1930–1931	Hibernian		
1931	Ards		
1931–1934	Bournemouth & Boscombe Athletic	75	(0)
1934	Ballymena United		
1935	Ross County		
Total		252	(4)

International career
1929	Ireland	3	(0)
- * Club domestic league appearances and goals

Joseph Miller (27 April 1899–unknown) was an Irish footballer who played in the Football League for Aberdare Athletic, Bournemouth & Boscombe Athletic and Middlesbrough.
