= Nathan Miller =

Nathan Miller may refer to:

- Nathan Miller (Rhode Island shipbuilder) (1743–1790), politician, Congressional delegate, militia general
- Nathan H. Miller (born 1943), politician in Virginia
- Nathan Lee Miller (1866–1933), ninth lieutenant governor of Alabama
- Nathan L. Miller (1868–1953), Governor of New York
- Nathan Miller in List of The 100 characters

== See also ==
- Nate Miller (disambiguation)
