= Ruth Miller =

Ruth Miller may refer to:

- Ruth Kirk (c. 1923–2000), née Miller, New Zealand anti-abortion campaigner
- Ruth Miller (artist) (1904–1978), American artist
- Ruth Miller (poet) (1919–1969), South African poet
- Ruth Miller (actress) (1903–1981), American actress
- Ruth Miller (1990s actress) in Thinner

== See also ==
- Patsy Ruth Miller (1904–1995), American actress
