= Nick Miller =

Nick or Nicholas Miller may refer to:

- Nick Miller (American football) (born 1987), American football wide receiver
- Nick Miller (artist) (born 1962), artist in Ireland
- Nick Miller (Canadian football) (born 1931), Canadian football player
- Nick Miller (cyclist) (born 1991), New Zealand racing cyclist
- Nick Miller (DJ), American DJ known as Illenium
- Nick Miller (hammer thrower) (born 1993), British hammer thrower
- Nick Miller (politician), (born 1995), member of the Pennsylvania State Senate
- Nick Miller (weather forecaster) (born 1970), British weather forecaster
- Mikey Nicholls (born 1985), Australian professional wrestler who used to wrestle as Nick Miller in WWE
- Nicholas D. Miller, American DJ who goes by the stage name Illenium
- Nick G. Miller (born 1964), American filmmaker and public speaker
- Nicholas K. Miller (born c. 1959), American football player
- Nicholas J. Miller, American professor of history
- Nick Miller (New Girl), a fictional character in the television sitcom New Girl
