= Carlos Miller =

Carlos Miller may refer to:

- Carlos Miller, creator of the website Photography Is Not a Crime
- Carlos O. Miller, scientist who isolated kinetin

== See also ==
- Karlous Miller (born 1983), American comedian
