= Harriet Mann Miller =

American author, naturalist, ornithologist

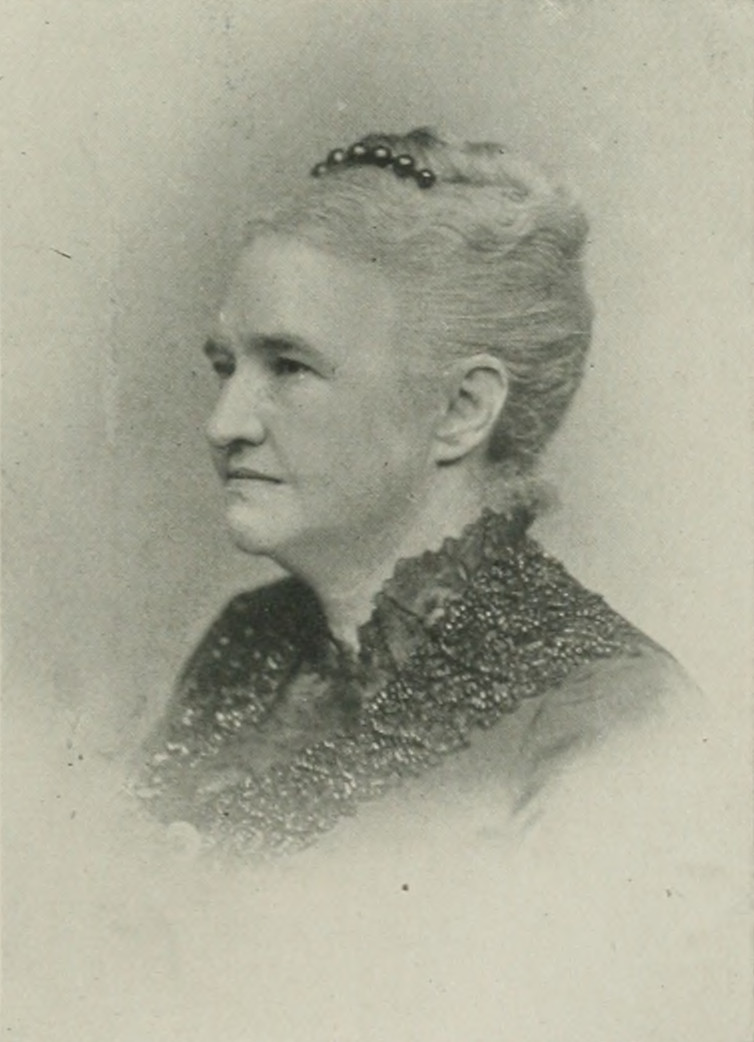
- Born: Harriet Mann; June 25, 1831; Auburn, New York, U.S.
- Died: December 25, 1918 (aged 87); Los Angeles, California, U.S.
- Spouse: Watts Todd Miller (m. 1854; died 1904)
- Writing career
- Pen name: Olive Thorne, Olive Thorne Miller
- Language: English
- Subjects: nature, birds

Signature
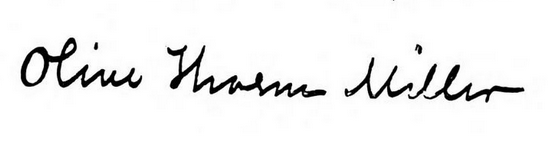

Harriet Mann Miller (pen names Olive Thorne and Olive Thorne Miller; 25 June 1831 – 25 December 1918) was an American author, naturalist, and ornithologist. She was one of the first three women raised to elective membership in the American Ornithologists' Union. Miller wrote stories for leading magazines. At the start of her career, her articles appeared under the pen name "Olive Thorne" while after marriage, she used the signature of "Olive Thorne Miller". Her books include: Little Folks in Feathers and Fur (1879), Queer Pets at Marcy’s (1880), Little People of Asia (1882), Birds’ Ways (1885), In Nesting Time (1888), and also a serial story entitled, "Nimpo’s Troubles", published in the St. Nicholas Magazine, in 1874.

== Early life and education ==
Harriet Mann was the eldest of four children born to Seth Hunt Mann, a banker, and Mary Field (Holbrook) Mann in Auburn, New York on 25 June 1831. She was the oldest of four siblings, the three brothers all being younger than herself. Her youth was passed in cities from New York to Missouri, stopping from three to five years in each place. Western New York, Ohio, Wisconsin, and Illinois were respectively her home.

When Miller was eleven years old, the Mann family was in Ohio, where she attended private schools for five years. Miller was a bookworm from her early days. She was reportedly a shy, awkward, girl, who retreated to her books. Her ambition was to write, though she hated school compositions and shirked them when possible.

== Career ==
When Mann was twenty she began writing short anonymous letters to the daily papers, on subjects of passing interest. At the age of twenty-three, in 1854, she married Watts Todd Miller, and added the name of Miller to her own. The couple would have four children. From 1858 to 1869, she put aside writing in order to raise her children. The couple lived in Chicago, Illinois, and after about 1875, in Brooklyn, New York.

Once her youngest child was no longer a baby, Mann took up writing again. She began to write an occasional letter to a paper, when feelings grew too strong for silence. It was then she assumed the name Olive Thorne, and later when the pseudonym was somewhat widely known, and the possession of two names became inconvenient, she added her own married name Miller.

Miller's first article for children, on the making of china, was published in 1870. Gradually, she drifted into sketches of natural history, depicting the personalities of birds or animals that was popular with children. These early sketches, published everywhere, were collected in 1873 and made into a book which had a steady, regular sale, Little Folk in Feathers and Fur, appearing in the mid-1870s. Later she made a second collection of her animal sketches which she called Queer Pets at Marcy's. Meanwhile, she wrote her first long story, "Nimpo's Troubles," which ran as a serial in St. Nicholas Magazine during its first years. A year or two after she wrote her fourth and last book for children, Little People of Asia. Her first use of the pseudonym Olive Thorne Miller was in 1879.

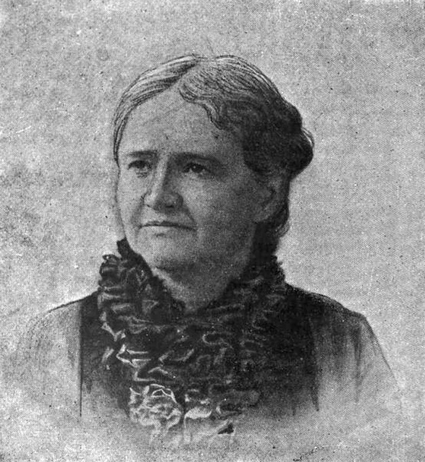
Olive Thorne Miller (1889)

In 1880, she became an avid bird watcher, introduced to the study of birds by Sara A. Hubbard, director of the Illinois Audubon Society. Miller studied captive birds, as well as birds in the wild in a series of field trips across the country during the period 1883–1903. Her work in this field, after publication in The Atlantic and other magazines, was published in several volumes. The first of eleven bird-related books, Bird Ways, appeared in 1885; In Nesting Time followed. In addition to writing on birds and their behavior, she contributed to the journal of the Audubon Society. She was a proponent of the movement to prevent hunting of birds for use of their plumes in the millinery trade. In 1901, along with Mabel Osgood Wright and Florence Merriam Bailey, Miller became one of the first three women raised to elective membership in the American Ornithologists' Union.

Miller published articles in religious weeklies and other publications, among them Harper's Weekly and the Chicago Tribune. Across her writing career, she produced an estimated 780 articles, one booklet on birds, and 24 complete books. Her work was acknowledged by professional biologists for its highly accurate research and observation.

After the death of her husband in 1904, Miller moved to Los Angeles, California. She died there on 25 December 1918.

== Selected works ==
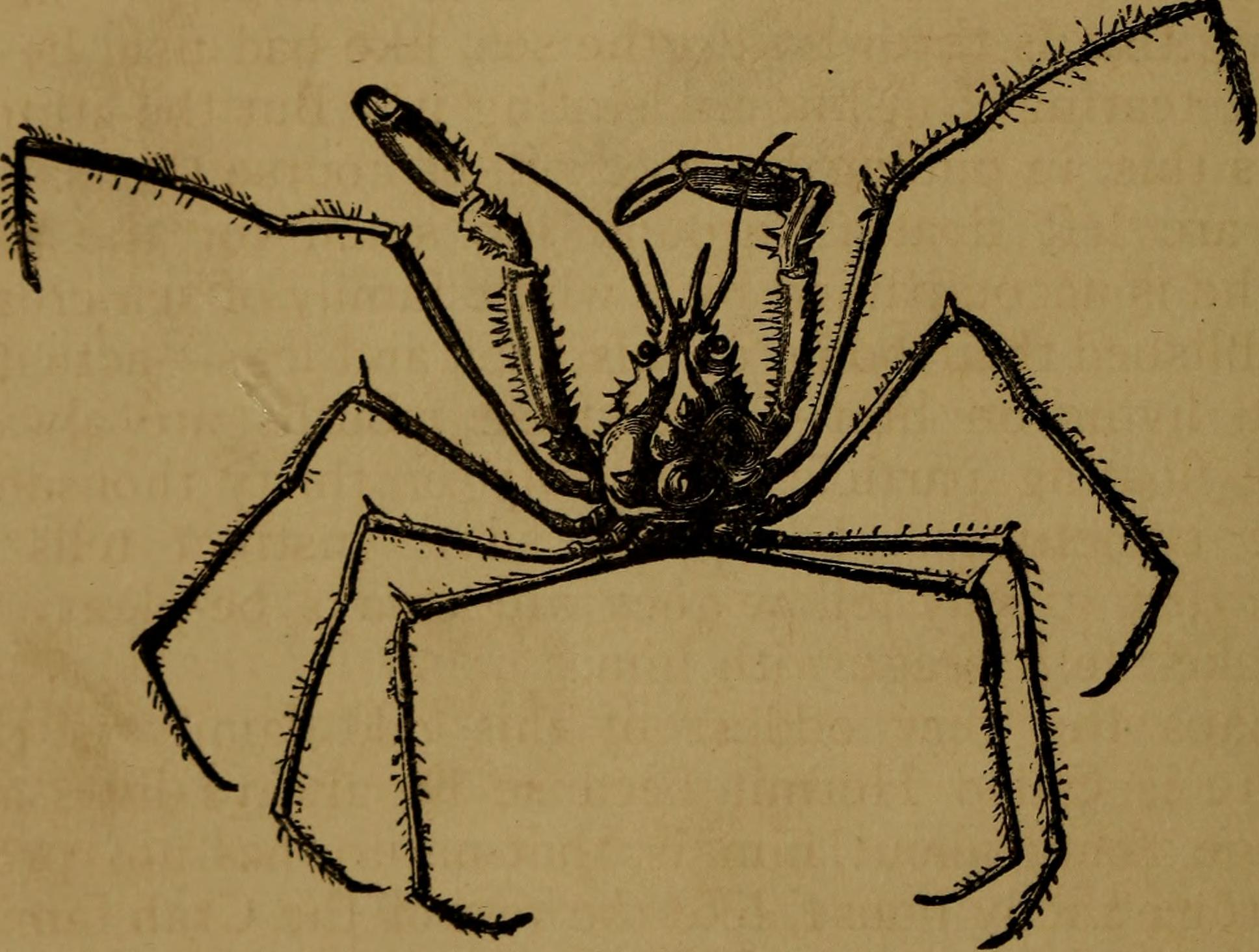
Illustration from Little Folks in Feathers and Fur, and Others in Neither (1875)

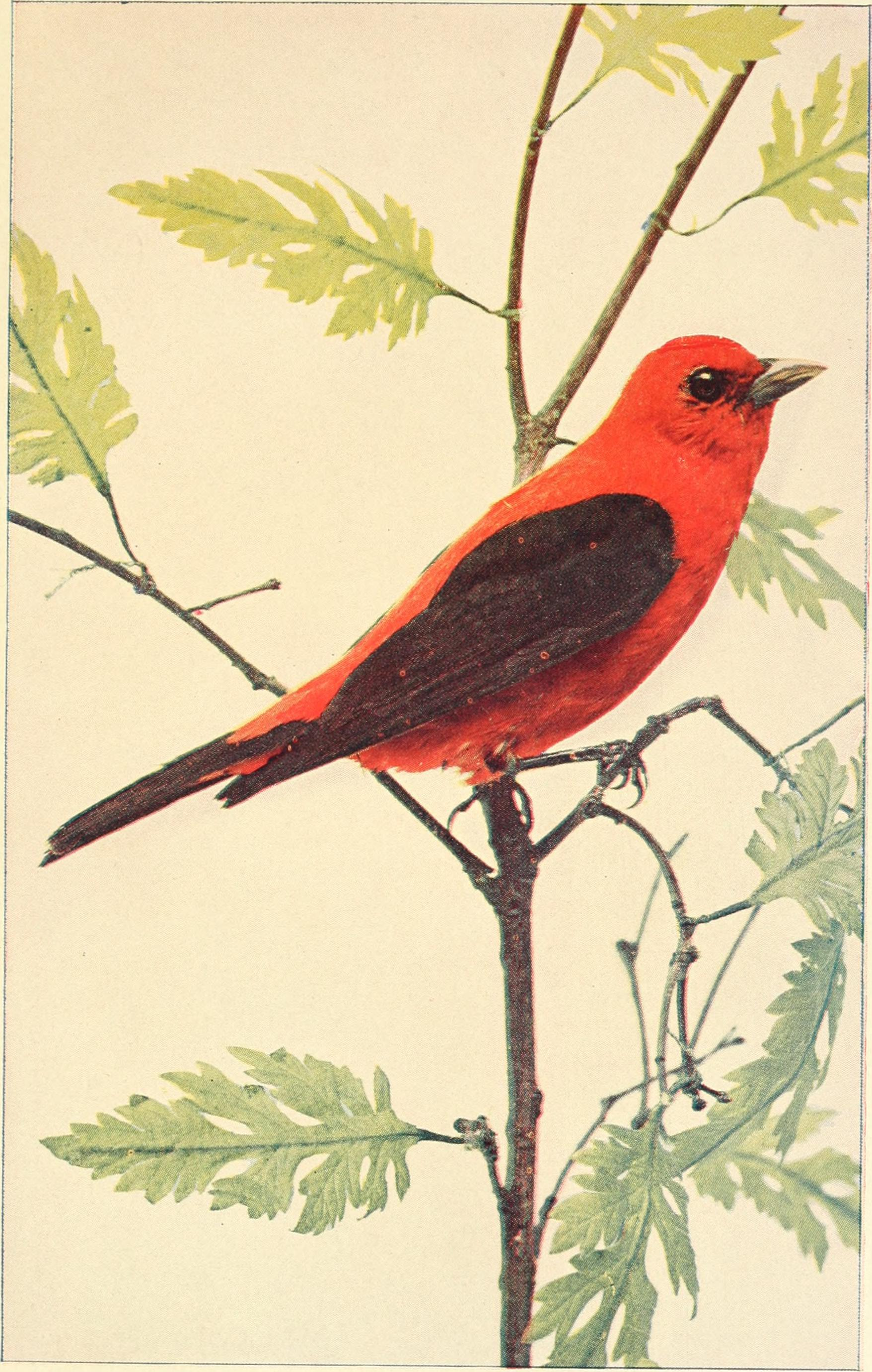
Illustration from The first book of birds (1899)

- Sick and in Prison (1873)
- Nimpo's Troubles (1880)
- The Bird of Solitude (1884)
- A Bit of Bird-life (1885)
- A Ruffian in Feathers (1885)
- Queer Pets and their Doings (1885)
- Flutterbudget (1887)
- The Woman's Club: a Practical Guide and Hand-book (1891)
- Kristy's Surprise Party (1905)
- Kristy's Rainy Day Picnic (1906)
- What Happened to Barbara (1907)
- The Children's Book of Birds (1915)

As Olive Thorne

- Miller, Harriet Mann (1875). Little Folks in Feathers and Fur, and Others in Neither. Hartford, CT: Dustin, Gilman & Co.

As Olive Thorne Miller

- Miller, Harriet Mann (1880). Queer Pets at Marcy's. New York, NY: E. P. Dutton & Company. doi:10.5962/bhl.title.59904. Illustrated by J. C. Beard.
- Miller, Harriet Mann (1885). Bird-ways. Boston, MA: Houghton, Mifflin and Co. doi:10.5962/bhl.title.33006.
- Miller, Harriet Mann (1888). In Nesting Time. Boston, MA: Houghton, Mifflin and Co. doi:10.5962/bhl.title.60272.
- Miller, Harriet Mann (1892). Funny Friends; Or, Queer Pets at Marcy's. New York, NY: E. P. Dutton & Company. doi:10.5962/bhl.title.59793.
- Miller, Harriet Mann (1892). Little Brothers of the Air. Boston, MA: Houghton, Mifflin and Co. doi:10.5962/bhl.title.60361.
- Miller, Harriet Mann (1894). A Bird-lover in the West. Boston, MA: Houghton, Mifflin and Co. doi:10.5962/bhl.title.32874. ISBN 040502679X.
- Miller, Harriet Mann (1894). Our Home Pets: How to Keep Them Well and Happy. New York, NY: Harper & Brothers. doi:10.5962/bhl.title.20266.
- Miller, Harriet Mann (1896). Four-handed Folk. Boston, MA: Houghton, Mifflin and Co. doi:10.5962/bhl.title.98378.
- Miller, Harriet Mann (1897). Upon the Tree-tops. Boston, MA: Houghton, Mifflin and Co. doi:10.5962/bhl.title.12525. Illustrated by J. Carter Beard.
- Miller, Harriet Mann (1899). The First Book of Birds. Boston, MA: Houghton, Mifflin and Co. doi:10.5962/bhl.title.13738. With eight colored and twelve plain plates and twenty figures in the text.
- Miller, Harriet Mann (1901). The Second Book of Birds: Bird Families. Boston, MA: Houghton, Mifflin and Co. doi:10.5962/bhl.title.13734. With eight colored plates from designs by Louis Agassiz Fuertes, and sixteen other full-page illustrations.
- Miller, Harriet Mann (1903). True Bird Stories from My Note-books. Boston, MA: Houghton, Mifflin and Co. doi:10.5962/bhl.title.60284. With illustrations by Louis Agassiz Fuertes.
- Miller, Harriet Mann (1904). With the Birds in Maine. Boston, MA: Houghton, Mifflin and Co. doi:10.5962/bhl.title.23151.
