= Lewis Miller =

Lewis Miller may refer to:

- Lewis Miller (folk artist) (1796–1882), Pennsylvania German folk artist
- Lewis Miller (philanthropist) (1829–1899), Ohio businessman and philanthropist
- Lewis Miller (Australian artist) (born 1959), Australian painter and visual artist
- Lewis T. Miller (1787–1856), American politician in the Michigan House of Representatives
- Lewis Miller (soccer) (born 2000), Australian footballer

== See also ==
- Louis E. Miller (1899–1952), U.S. Representative from Missouri
