= Hal Miller =

Hal Miller may refer to:

- Hal Miller (politician) (1929–2015), British politician
- Hal Miller (actor) (1935–2017), American actor
- Hal Miller (American football) (1930–2011), American sportsman
- Hal Millar (1913–1991), American special effects artist

== See also ==
- Miller (surname)
