= Pat Miller (dog trainer) =

American dog trainer

Patricia Miller (born October 14, 1951, in Springfield, Illinois) is an American dog trainer noted for her experience in clicker training. She operates a dog training facility, Peaceable Paws, in Fairplay, Maryland.

== Biography ==
Miller was born in Springfield, Illinois and graduated from high school in Mequon, Wisconsin then moved to Vestal, New York after her stepfather Harold L. Nieburg had accepted a position at SUNY Binghamton. She worked at the Marin Humane Society in Marin County, California for twenty years and now lives in Fairplay, Maryland with her husband Paul.

She is the author of more than 500 articles (particularly in Whole Dog Journal) and several books, including The Power of Positive Dog Training and Positive Perspectives: Love Your Dog, Train Your Dog and its sequel.
