= Freddie Miller =

Freddie Miller may refer to:

- Freddie Miller (broadcaster) (1929–1992), broadcaster and television personality in Atlanta, Georgia, United States
- Freddie Miller (rugby league) (c. 1915–1960), British rugby league footballer of the 1940s and 1950s
- Freddie Miller (boxer) (1911–1962), American boxer

== See also ==
- Fred Miller (disambiguation)
