= Annie Miller (disambiguation) =

Annie Miller (1835–1925) was an English artists' model.

Annie Miller may also refer to:

- Annie Miller (tennis) (born 1977), American retired tennis player
- Annie Jenness Miller (1859–1935), American clothing designer
- Annie Miller (Millais painting), an 1854 oil painting of the model by John Everett Millais
