= John Miller =

John Miller may refer to:

== Politics ==
=== United States ===
- John Miller (Indiana judge) (1840–1898), justice of the Indiana Supreme Court, 1891-1893
- John Miller (North Dakota politician) (1843–1908), governor of North Dakota, 1889–1891
- John Miller (Missouri politician) (1781–1846), governor of Missouri, 1826–1832; U.S. representative from Missouri, 1837–1843
- John Miller (Washington politician) (1938–2017), U.S. representative from Washington
- John Miller (New York politician) (1774–1862), U.S. representative from New York
- John Miller (Virginia politician) (1947–2016), state senator from Virginia
- John Miller (police official) (born 1958), New York Police Department official, former FBI official, journalist and former television host
- John E. Miller (1888–1981), U.S. congressman from Arkansas and federal judge
- John E. Miller (Arkansas politician) (1929–2014), U.S. businessman and state representative in Arkansas
- John Franklin Miller (California politician) (1831–1886), U.S. senator from California, uncle of John Franklin Miller the Washington congressman
- John Franklin Miller (Washington politician) (1862–1936), U.S. representative from Washington
- John Gaines Miller (1812–1856), U.S. representative from Missouri
- John Guerrant Miller (1795–1871), mayor of Columbus, Ohio
- John J. Miller (Virginia politician) (1849–1923), state legislator from Virginia
- John Henry Miller (politician), speaker of the Illinois House of Representatives
- John J. Miller Jr. (1923–2012), American politician in New Jersey
- John K. Miller (1819–1863), U.S. representative from Ohio
- John L. Miller (politician), member of the New Jersey Senate
- John Lester Miller (1901–1978), U.S. federal judge
- John Lucas Miller (1831–1864), attorney and state legislator in South Carolina
- John M. Miller (politician), member of the Maryland Senate
- John Miller (pseudonym), a pseudonym used by Donald Trump

=== Other countries ===
- John Miller (engineer) (1805–1883), MP for Edinburgh 1868–1874
- John Ontario Miller (1857–1943), British Indian civil servant
- John Stewart Miller (1844–1936), member of Provincial Parliament in Ontario
- Sir John Miller, 2nd Baronet (1665–1721), MP for Chichester 1698–1700, 1701–1705 and 1710–1713 and Sussex 1701
- Sir John Miller, 3rd Baronet (1867–1918), justice of the peace and magistrate for Kent, 1889
- John Miller (New South Wales politician) (1870–1934), New South Wales state MP
- Sir John Riggs Miller (c. 1744–1798), Anglo-Irish politician
- John Miller (South Australian politician) (1840–1919), member of the South Australian House of Assembly
- John Classon Miller (1836–1884), Ontario lumber merchant and political figure
- John Miller (New Zealand politician), New Zealand politician and veterinarian, mayor of Invercargill

== Military ==
- John G. Miller (Medal of Honor) (1841–1909), American Civil War soldier and Medal of Honor recipient
- John Miller (Medal of Honor, 1865) (1839–1882), Hessian-born America Civil War soldier and Medal of Honor recipient
- John Miller (equerry) (1919–2006), British lieutenant-colonel and Crown Equerry
- John C. Miller Jr. (1912–2000), United States Marine Corps general
- John H. Miller (1925–2025), United States Marine Corps general
- John P. Miller (naval officer) (fl. 1920s), United States Navy officer and acting naval governor of Guam
- John W. Miller, United States Navy admiral
- John E. Miller (general) (born 1941), U.S. Army general
- John Grider Miller (1935–2009), United States Marine Corps officer
- John M. Miller III (1896–c. 1980), American naval aviator
- John Miller (Royal Navy officer) (1903–1994)

== Arts ==
=== Visual arts ===
- John Miller (American artist) (born 1954), American visual artist, writer and musician based in New York and Berlin
- John Miller (Cornish artist) (1931–2002), English artist specializing in beach scenes
- John Miller (botanical illustrator) (1715–c. 1792), German engraver, painter, and botanist
- John Douglas Miller (1860–1903), English engraver
- John Frederick Miller (1759–1796), English illustrator
- John Paul Miller (1918–2013), American jewellery designer and goldsmith
- John M. Miller (artist) (born 1939), American painter based in Los Angeles

=== Film, television and music ===
- John Miller (film producer), American film producer
- John Miller (musician) (born 1945), Broadway music coordinator and actor
- John Miller Jr. (born 1942), American bassoonist, principal of the Minnesota Orchestra
- John D. Miller (television executive) (born 1950), NBC advertising and marketing executive
- John Lloyd Miller, American filmmaker
- John P. Miller (born 1976), birthname of actor and singer Austin Miller
- John Miller, a pseudonym of Tjut Djalil (1927–2014), Indonesian filmmaker

== Sports ==
=== Association football ===
- John Miller (footballer, born 1870) (1870–1933), Scottish footballer with Liverpool and Sheffield Wednesday
- John Miller (footballer, born 1878) (1878–?), Scottish footballer for Burnley
- John Miller (footballer, born 1890) (1890–1932), Scottish footballer
- John Miller (footballer, born 1895) (1895–1956), Scottish footballer for Liverpool and Aberdeen
- John Miller (Queen's Park footballer), Scottish footballer
- John Miller (St Mirren footballer) (fl. 1924–1934), Scottish footballer

=== American football ===
- John Miller (fullback) (1894–1971), NFL player, 1921
- John Miller (offensive lineman, born 1934) (1934–2015), NFL player, 1956–1960
- John Miller (offensive lineman, born 1993)
- John Miller (linebacker) (born 1960), NFL player, 1987
- John Miller (safety) (born 1966), NFL player, 1989–1990
- John Miller (American football coach)
- Bing Miller (American football) (1903–1964), NFL player, 1929–1931

=== Baseball ===
- Ox Miller (John Anthony Miller, 1915–2007), American baseball pitcher
- John Miller (first baseman) (1944–2023), baseball player in the United States (1966–1969) and Japan (1970–1972)
- John Miller (pitcher) (1941–2020), American baseball player for the Baltimore Orioles

=== Other sports ===
- John F. Miller (American football) (1890–?), American football, basketball, and baseball coach and college athletics administrator
- John Miller (cyclist) (1881–1957), British Olympic road racing cyclist
- John Miller (basketball), American basketball coach
- John Miller (rower) (1903–1965), American rower
- John Miller (cricketer) (1770–1825), English first-class cricketer
- John Miller (weightlifter) (1909–1983), American Olympic weightlifter
- J. J. Miller (born 1933), Australian jockey and horse trainer
- Spider Miller (John Miller, born c. 1950), American amateur golfer
- John Miller (hurler) (born 1966), Irish hurler

== Literature and journalism ==
- John Jackson Miller (born 1968), American comic book writer and commentator
- John J. Miller (journalist) (born 1970), American political reporter
- John J. Miller (author) (1954–2022), science fiction author known for his work in the Wild Cards series
- John Miller (author), historical fiction author
- John Miller (journalist and author) (1932–2020), British journalist and author
- John Miller (police official) (born 1958), New York Police Department official, former FBI official, journalist and former television host
- John Ramsey Miller (born 1949), American author
- John Miller (writer) (born 1968), Canadian writer and consultant
- John Henry Miller (printer) (1702–1782), printer and publisher
- John Miller (literary historian), British academic
- John Miller (historian) (born 1946), British historian

== Others ==
- John C. Miller (born 1978), CEO of Cali Group
- John Miller (engineer) (1805–1883), Edinburgh-based railway engineer (Grainger & Miller)
- John A. Miller (1872–1941), roller coaster designer and builder
- John Miller (bishop) (born 1949), American marine biologist and Anglican bishop
- John Miller (minister), moderator of the General Assembly of the Church of Scotland, 2001
- J. Michael Miller (born 1946), Canadian prelate of the Roman Catholic Church
- John Milton Miller (1882–1962), American electrical engineer
- John William Miller (1895–1978), American philosopher
- John Samuel Miller (1779–1830), English naturalist
- Captain John H. Miller, fictional character in the 1998 film Saving Private Ryan
- John Miller (entomologist) (1882–1952), American entomologist
- John Chester Miller (1907–1991), American historian
- John Harry Miller (1869–1940), Scottish theologian and principal of St Marys College at St Andrews University
- John H. Miller Jr., American physicist
- John William Miller (aviation) (1880–1953), American aviation pioneer, civil engineer, and professor
- John P. Miller (educator) (fl. 1960s–2000s), Canadian educator
- John Miller (architect) (1930–2024), British architect
- SS John Miller, a Liberty ship

== See also ==
- Johnny Miller (disambiguation)
- John Millar (disambiguation)
- Jack Miller (disambiguation)
- Jonathan Miller (disambiguation), also Jon Miller
- Miller (name)
