= John M. Miller =

John M. Miller may refer to:

- John M. Miller (politician) (1820–1897), American politician from Maryland
- John Milton Miller (1882–1962), American electrical engineer
- John Miller (entomologist) (John Martin Miller, 1882–1952)
- John M. Miller (artist) (born 1939), American painter
- John M. Miller (1905 − 2008), pioneering American aviator

== See also ==
- John Miller (disambiguation)
