= John P. Miller =

John P. Miller may refer to:

- John Paul Miller (naval officer) (1882–1945), United States Navy officer and acting Naval Governor of Guam
- John Paul Miller (1918–2013), American jewellery designer and goldsmith
- John P. Miller (born 1976), birthname of actor and singer Austin Miller
- John P. Miller (educator) (fl. 1960s–2000s), Canadian educator

== See also ==
- John Miller (disambiguation)
