= Finlay Macdonald (minister) =

Church of Scotland minister

Finlay A. J. Macdonald
- Born: 1945 (age 80–81); Watford, England
- Occupation: Minister
- Spouse: Elma

Finlay A. J. Macdonald is a retired minister of the Church of Scotland. He was Principal Clerk to the General Assembly of the Church of Scotland from 1996 until 2010. In addition to his rapid rise up the ranks of the Church of Scotland, Macdonald is known for fostering co-operation between the various boards and committees which administer the Church and for steering the Church smoothly through its annual business meetings.

== Biography ==
=== Early life ===
Born in 1945 in Watford, England, his family returned to Scotland in 1949, settling in Dundee. His father, John - from the Hebrides - was also a Church of Scotland minister and his grandfather, also John, was a missionary. Finlay Macdonald attended the High School of Dundee, one of Scotland's leading independent schools (and the only such school in Dundee). At age 16, Macdonald began his lifelong career in the ministry when he joined Camperdown Parish Church as an organist. At age 18, Macdonald left the High School of Dundee with the intention of becoming a lawyer.

=== Education ===
In 1963, Macdonald matriculated at the University of St Andrews, the oldest university in Scotland and third oldest in the English-speaking world. In his first year of university, Macdonald combined law studies at the city's Queen's College (then part of St Andrews University) with arts subjects in St Andrews. Macdonald subsequently took up the study of philosophy and received his Master of Arts (M.A.) degree in philosophy in 1968. At some point during Macdonald's questioning and creation of theories about the nature of reality, the call to be a lawyer for God had taken hold and Macdonald entered St Mary's College in 1968 with the goal of becoming a minister.

He graduated with a Bachelor of Divinity (Hons) degree in 1970. Macdonald married Elma, a primary school teacher, and produced two sons, one a doctor in Perth, Western Australia, the other an architect in Edinburgh.

=== Career ===
After finishing his studies, Macdonald became assistant minister at Bo'ness Old Kirk, but within two months he found himself in sole charge. At age 26 in 1971, Macdonald was ordained and inducted at Menstrie Parish Church in Menstrie, Clackmannanshire by the presbytery of Stirling and Dunblane. It was at Menstrie Parish Church where Macdonald began serving his first charge as minister Macdonald became involved in the administration of the presbytery, serving for four years as junior clerk and treasurer.

In 1977, Macdonald moved to Jordanhill Parish Church, in the west end of Glasgow, where served as minister for nineteen years, from 1977 to 1996. In 1988, Macdonald was elevated to governor of Jordanhill College of Education. In that same year, the demonstration school attached to the teacher training college, known as Jordanhill College School, separated from the college to form Jordanhill School. At Jordanhill College, Macdonald chaired the PTA Action Committee, which campaigned successfully for the school's survival as a local primary and secondary within the public sector. In 1993 the college itself merged into the University of Strathclyde with the Jordanhill campus subsequently serving as home of the Education Faculty. With the merger, Macdonald left his position as president.

During this same period of time (1988 to 1992), Macdonald was convener of the General Assembly's Board of Practice and Procedure and of the Assembly's Business Committee.

In 1983 he completed his PhD thesis entitled "Law and Doctrine in the Church of Scotland with particular reference to Confessions of Faith".

From 1993 until 1996, Macdonald was a lay member of Strathclyde University Court, chairing the education faculty advisory committee. During this same period (1993 to 1996), Macdonald combined his ministry at Jordanhill with the role of Depute Clerk to the General Assembly.

In 1996, Macdonald succeeded the Very Rev Dr James Weatherhead as the Principal Clerk to the General Assembly of the Church of Scotland. As Principal Clerk, Macdonald helped bring about the culture of change which produced the Church Without Walls report.

=== Moderator of the General Assembly ===
In September 2001, four ministers were shortlisted as moderator: Macdonald, Peter Neilson of St Cuthbert's Church in Edinburgh, Sheila Blount of Falkirk, and Margaret Forrester of St Michael's Church in Edinburgh. The Glasgow was well represented by this nomination as Macdonald, Neilson and Blount all had ties to Glasgow. Moreover, the outgoing moderator John Miller was from Glasgow.

Macdonald had an advantage over the other three candidates. In general, most holders of the office of Principal Clerk have become Moderator. Macdonald had become well-known and widely respected in the Church of Scotland. Noted commentator Stewart Lamont wrote about Macdonald's nomination:

It was inevitable the widely-respected Finlay Macdonald would be proposed at some time. As secretary to each Moderator, he knows the job as well as any, and since the Queen will act as her own Lord High Commissioner next year, a safe pair of hands is needed. The current edition of Life and Work contains an article by Finlay Macdonald on the need to share out leadership responsibilities. Good timing or coincidence? Although classifiable as Old Kirk moderate, the current PC is PC on the subject of women in the ministry. When a parish minister in Jordanhill, he once demanded that a minister with fundamentalist views on women elders be required to pledge he would not veto women if he was inducted to another Glasgow parish.

There was a 75% chance that the 2002 Moderator would have a Glasgow connection. Macdonald was announced the Moderator Designate on 20 October 2001, ending speculation that The Kirk was ready to appoint its first female moderator. Although some were disappointed that a woman was not chosen, most believe that the proper choice had been made. Macdonald himself was gracious and understanding of the importance of gender and the Moderator position saying, "Clearly I don't know what considerations swayed the nomination committee today. I am just very honoured. I would be delighted to see a woman as moderator and hope that will happen."

In December 2001, Macdonald was appointed a Chaplain to the Queen in Scotland.

==== Moderator: 25 May 2002 – 24 May 2003 ====
In May 2002, Macdonald's nomination for the one-year post went before the General Assembly and, as expected, Macdonald succeeded John Miller as Moderator of the General Assembly of the Church of Scotland on Saturday, 25 May 2002. The Queen did not install Macdonald as the Moderator, but only observed the ceremony.

At the time Macdonald took up the office of Moderator, the total population of the Church had fallen steadily from 5.21 million in 1971 to 5.11 million in 2002. As the new Moderator, Macdonald saw the primary task for the Church of Scotland as becoming more appealing to a younger audience to turn this tide of more than 30 years of falling congregations.

In June 2002, Macdonald received an honorary Doctor of Divinity degree from the University of St Andrews. During his speech, Macdonald rejected the idea of creating more faith, church and culture-based schools in favor of existing schools educating pupils within a moral and spiritual framework.

=== Post Moderator ===
The moderatorship is for one year only; Macdonald was succeeded by Professor Iain R. Torrance in May 2003. Macdonald returned to his role as Principal Clerk to the General Assembly of the Church of Scotland and as an honorary Chaplain to the Queen in Scotland. He is an active member of ACTS (Action of Churches Together in Scotland), CTBI (Churches Together in Britain and Ireland). He was also formerly a member of EECCS (European Ecumenical Commission on Church and Society).

His formal title (following the end of his Moderatorial year) is the Very Reverend Dr Finlay Macdonald.

He retired in 2010 and was succeeded as Principal Clerk by the Rev John Chalmers.

== Footnotes and references ==
(Note: Most references archived at Church of Scotland Extranet search.) Obtained 3 November 2006.

== Publications ==
- Macdonald, Finlay A. J. (May 2001). Deliverances of the General Assembly of the Church of Scotland: Special Commission Anent Review and Reform in the Church. A Church Without Walls.
- Children at the Table. (1982) David G. Hamilton (Editor); Finlay J. Macdonald (Editor). Publisher: Church of Scotland Date Published: ISBN 0-86153-048-9
- Luke Paul. (2012); Finlay J. Macdonald. Publisher: Shoving Leopard Productions Date Published: ISBN 9781905565214

== See also ==
- List of moderators of the General Assembly of the Church of Scotland

Religious titles
Preceded by John D. Miller	Moderator of the General Assembly of the Church of Scotland; 2002–2003	Succeeded by Iain Torrance
