= John Millar =

John Millar may refer to:

- John Millar (philosopher) (1735–1801), Scottish philosopher and historian
- John Millar, Lord Craighill (1817–1888), Scottish judge
- John A. Millar (1855–1915), New Zealand politician
- John Millar (Canadian politician) (1866–1950)
- Jock Millar (John McVey Millar, born 1907), Scottish footballer (Barnsley, Hartlepools United, New Brighton, Rochdale, Exeter City). See 1937–38 Rochdale A.F.C. season
- John Millar (footballer, born 1923) (1923–1986), Scottish footballer
- John Millar (footballer, born 1927) (1927–1991), Scottish footballer
- Sandy Millar (John Alexander Kirkpatrick Millar, born 1939), Anglican bishop
- John Millar (footballer, born 1966), Scottish footballer (Chelsea, Blackburn Rovers, Heart of Midlothian)
- John Millar (rugby union), Scottish rugby union player
- John Millar, Scottish confectioner, see Millar McCowan
- John Millar, American spiritual head of Elohim City, Oklahoma
- John Millar, musician in The Hush Now

== See also ==
- John Miller (disambiguation)
- John Millar Andrews (1871–1956), Prime Minister of Northern Ireland
- John Millar Watt (1895–1975), Scottish artist
