= Jolly Green Giant (disambiguation) =

Jolly Green Giant is a mascot of the Green Giant vegetable company.

It may also refer to:

- The Sikorsky S-61R, a 1959 helicopter
- The Sikorsky CH-53 Sea Stallion, a 1966 helicopter
- The Sikorsky MH-53, a 1967 USAF helicopter
- "The Jolly Green Giant", a 1965 hit by The Kingsmen
- Randy Winkler (born 1943), American former professional football player, nicknamed the "Jolly Green Giant"

== See also ==
- The Jolly Giant, a defunct chain of large toy shops in the United Kingdom
