= Patrick Painter =

Patrick Painter

Patrick Painter (born Patrick Lee Painter, April 27, 1954, Long Beach, California), is an Irish-American art dealer who runs Patrick Painter Inc., which includes two art galleries in Bergamot Station, Santa Monica, California; he also owns Patrick Painter Editions.

Painter was mentored by art dealer Leo Castelli and curator Walter Hopps. In 1991, he began Patrick Painter Editions in Vancouver, British Columbia, Canada and Hong Kong, with his first edition (of three) being two prints by Roy Arden. The next year, he made editions for Richard Prince, Larry Johnson, and Jeff Wall, among others. Since its inception, Patrick Painter Editions has made small editions of works by John Baldessari, Mike Kelley, Ed Ruscha, Paul McCarthy, Anish Kapoor, Peter Doig, Richard Hawkins, Glenn Brown, Andrea Zittel, Christopher Wool, Collier Schorr, Harmony Korine, Douglas Huebler, Felix Gonzalez-Torres, Art & Language and John Miller. Although Patrick Painter Editions was established in a depressed market, he managed to build his business upon the success he had turning editions. Fine art prints, or multiple editions, were looked down upon at the time by many critics and collectors; Painter created a unique approach to the market. In 1996, twenty galleries in several countries had shows of exclusively Patrick Painter Editions.

Painter opened Patrick Painter Inc., an art gallery in Santa Monica, CA, in 1997 with the backing and support of Mike Kelley and Paul McCarthy, while continuing to maintain his fine art editions activities. Today, Patrick Painter Inc. represents and shows work by both new and established artists including David Onri Anderson, Stephan Balleux, Georg Baselitz, Tim Berresheim, Glenn Brown, André Butzer, Greg Colson, Liz Craft, Valie Export, Bernard Frize, Francesca Gabbiani, Chaz Guest, Salomón Huerta, Jörg Immendorff, Larry Johnson, Mike Kelley, Won Ju Lim, John Miller, John Newsom, Albert Oehlen, Philippe Pasqua, Max Presneill, Peter Saul, Mattias Schaufler, Christoph Schmidberger, Jim Shaw, Melanie Smith, Meyer Vaisman, Marnie Weber, Toby Ziegler, and Thomas Zipp, as well as the estate of Bas Jan Ader.
