= Governor Miller =

Governor Miller may refer to:

- Benjamin M. Miller (1864–1944), 39th Governor of Alabama
- Bob Miller (Nevada governor) (born 1945), 26th Governor of Nevada
- Charles R. Miller (politician) (1857–1927), 54th Governor of Delaware
- James Miller (general) (1776–1851), 1st Governor of Arkansas Territory
- John Miller (North Dakota politician) (1843–1908), 1st Governor of North Dakota
- John Miller (Missouri politician) (1781–1846), 4th Governor of Missouri
- John P. Miller (naval officer), Acting Naval Governor of Guam
- Keith Harvey Miller (1925–2019), 3rd Governor of Alaska
- Leslie A. Miller (1886–1970), 17th Governor of Wyoming
- Nathan L. Miller (1868–1953), 43rd Governor of New York
- Stephen Miller (Minnesota governor) (1816–1881), 4th Governor of Minnesota
- Stephen Decatur Miller (1787–1838), 52nd Governor of South Carolina
- Thomas Miller (North Carolina governor) (died 1685), 7th Governor of Albemarle Sound
- Walter Dale Miller (1925–2015), 29th Governor of South Dakota
- William Miller (North Carolina politician) (1783–1825), 18th Governor of North Carolina
- William Read Miller (1823–1887), 12th Governor of Arkansas
- Zell Miller (1932–2018), 79th Governor of Georgia
