= Stephen Park (sports executive) =

Stephen Mackenzie Park CBE (born 24 February 1968) is a Scottish yachtsman and the performance director of British Cycling.

== Early life and education ==
Born in Glasgow, Scotland, Stephen Park grew up in Helensburgh, where he attended Hermitage Primary and Hermitage Academy schools provided by Argyll and Bute Council. He completed a BA degree at the Scottish School of Physical Education, part of the University of Strathclyde Faculty of Education. He later completed a Diploma in Management Studies at Newcastle University and an MSc at Loughborough University. He was awarded an honorary MSc by the University of Chichester in 2009.

== Career ==
He worked with the British Sailing Team for the Royal Yachting Association from 1997-2016. Appointed as Olympic Manager in 2001, he led the Olympic and Paralympic Sailing Teams to the Games in Athens 2004, Beijing 2008, London 2012 and Rio 2016.

He was appointed performance director of British Cycling in December 2016.

Park was appointed Officer of the Order of the British Empire (OBE) in the 2008 New Year Honours for services to sailing and Commander of the Order of the British Empire (CBE) in the 2022 New Year Honours for services to cycling.
