= John F. Miller =

John F. Miller may refer to:

- John Franklin Miller (California politician) (1831–1886), U.S. Senator from California, Union Army general
- John Franklin Miller (Washington politician) (1862–1936), U.S Representative from Washington, mayor of Seattle
- John F. Miller (Ann Arbor mayor), served 1861–1862, see List of mayors of Ann Arbor, Michigan
- John F. Miller (American football) (1890–1972), American sports coach and administrator
- John F. Miller (Oregon politician), member of the Oregon Territorial Legislature, 1853
- John F. Miller (Texas politician), see Texas Senate, District 14

== See also ==
- John Miller (disambiguation)
