= Jackie Knight (sportsman) =

Scottish cricketer

Personal information
- Full name: John Dolan Knight
- Born: 22 June 1945 (age 81); Broughty Ferry, Angus, Scotland
- Batting: Right-handed
- Role: Wicket-keeper

Domestic team information
- Years: Team
- 1984–1987: Scotland

Career statistics
Competition	First-class
Matches	12
Runs scored	19
Batting average	6.33
100s/50s	–/–
Top score	8*
Catches/stumpings	4/2
- Source: Cricinfo, 29 June 2022

John "Jackie" Dolan Knight (born 22 June 1945) is a Scottish former cricketer and amateur footballer.

Knight was born at Broughty Ferry in June 1945 and was later educated at Jordanhill College. Knight played football at amateur level for Jordanhill Teacher Training College F.C., and was part of the Jordanhill side which lost 6–2 to National Cash Registers Dundee F.C. in the final of the 1964–65 Scottish Amateur Cup at Hampden Park. He was again a member of the Jordanhill side which made the final the following season, where they defeated Edinburgh Albion F.C. 7–0.

As a cricketer, Knight made his debut for Scotland in List A one-day cricket against Northamptonshire in the 1984 Benson & Hedges Cup at Northampton. He played one-day cricket for Scotland as a wicket-keeper until 1987, making twelve appearances across the Benson & Hedges Cup and the NatWest Trophy. He scored 19 runs in his twelve matches, while keeping-wicket he took four catches and made two stumpings. He played his club cricket for a variety of sides, including Brechin, Aberdeenshire, and Strathmore. By profession, he was a schoolteacher.
