= Ben Miller (hurler) =

Irish hurler (born 2005)

Personal information
- Born: 2005 (age 20–21) Birr, County Offaly, Ireland
- Occupation: Student

Sport
- Sport: Hurling
- Position: Full-back
Club
- Years: Club
- 2023-present: Birr
Club titles
- Offaly titles: 0
College
- Years: College
- 2023-present: University of Limerick
College titles
- Fitzgibbon titles: 0
Inter-county
- Years: County
- 2025-: Offaly
Inter-county titles
- Leinster titles: 0
- All-Irelands: 0
- NHL: 0
- All Stars: 0

Ben Miller (born 2005) is an Irish hurler. At club level he plays with Birr and at inter-county level with the Offaly senior hurling team.

== Career ==
Miller played hurling as a student at St Brendan's Community School in Birr. His performances for the school resulted in his inclusion on the combined Offaly Schools team which won the Leinster PPS SAHC title in 2023. He has also lined out with the University of Limerick. Miller plays his club hurling with Birr.

At inter-county level, Miller first appeared for Offaly as a member of the under-20 team. He won an All-Ireland U20HC medal after beating Tipperary by 2–20 to 2–14 in the All-Ireland final. Miller joined the Offaly senior hurling team in 2025.

== Personal life ==
His father, John Miller, played hurling at all levels with Offaly between 1982 and 1995 and was a member of the team that won the All-Ireland SHC title in 1994.

== Honours ==
Offaly Schools

- Leinster PPS Senior A Hurling Championship: 2023

Offaly

- All-Ireland Under-20 Hurling Championship: 2024
- Leinster Under-20 Hurling Championship: 2024
