= Jordanhill Parish Church, Glasgow =

Coordinates: 55°53′07″N 4°19′45″W

Jordanhill Parish Church
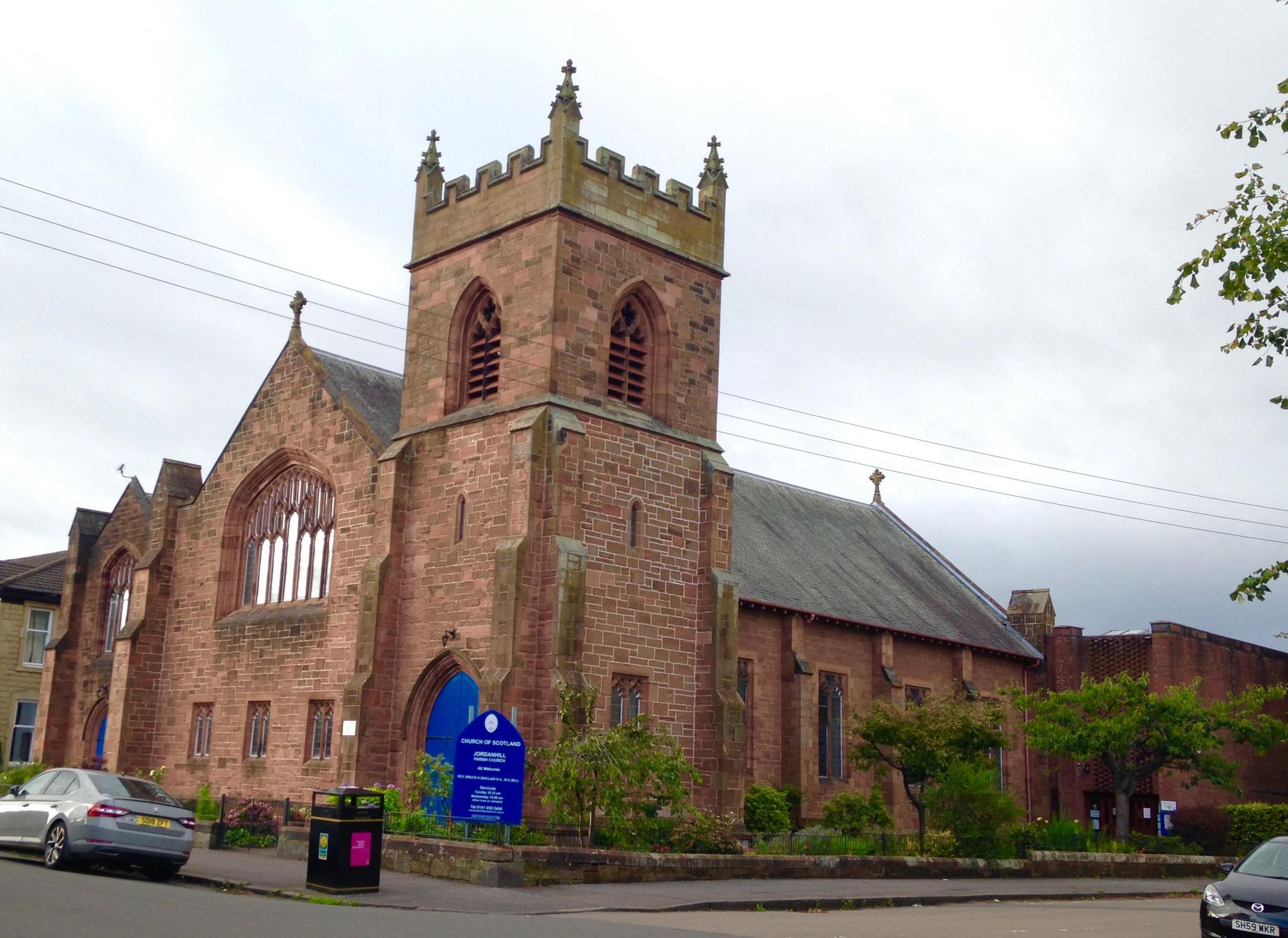
- Jordanhill Parish Church
- Location: Glasgow
- Country: Scotland
- Denomination: Church of Scotland

History
- Status: Active
- Founded: 1858

Architecture
- Functional status: Parish church
- Architectural type: Church
- Style: Gothic Revival
- Years built: 1904-1905
- Completed: 11 June 1905

Administration
- Parish: Jordanhill

Listed Building – Category B
- Designated: 15 December 1970
- Reference no.: LB32347

Jordanhill Parish Church is a parish church of the Church of Scotland, serving Jordanhill in the west end of Glasgow, Scotland. It is within the Church of Scotland's Presbytery of Glasgow. The church building is located on Woodend Drive, Jordanhill.

== History ==
The congregation started as Hillhead Free Church in 1854, although it was initially a "preaching station" rather than a "sanctioned charge" of the Free Church of Scotland. The congregation initially met in a school in Knightswood Road, with the first building being constructed nearby in 1858. Following serious structural problems with the building (largely arising from coal mining in the area), a decision was made to move to a new site. The first services in the current building were held on 11 June 1905.

The name was changed to Jordanhill Free Church in 1888. Following the creation of the United Free Church of Scotland in 1900, the name was changed to Jordanhill United Free Church. The name again changed in 1929, following the union of the United Free Church with the Church of Scotland, becoming "Jordanhill Church of Scotland" and - from 1979 - simply "Jordanhill Parish Church". The congregation were linked with Blawarthill Parish Church and St Columba Gaelic Church on 25 September 2025.

== Ministers ==
- Rev Peter McLachlan (1859-1870)
- Rev James Jolly (1870-1873)
- Rev G D R Munro (1874-1902)
- Rev Dr A D Livingstone (1899-1938)
- Rev George Allison (1939-1943)
- Rev John C. Cockburn (1944-1958)
- Rev Dr J M Orr (1960-1976)
- Very Rev Dr Finlay A. J. Macdonald (1977-1996). Dr Macdonald left to become Principal Clerk to the General Assembly of the Church of Scotland and was Moderator of the General Assembly of the Church of Scotland in 2002.
- Rev Colin C Renwick (1996-2014). Rev Colin Renwick left to become the Minister of Dunblane Cathedral and was Moderator of the Presbytery of Stirling in 2022.
- Rev Bruce H Sinclair (2015) is the present minister

== See also ==
- List of Church of Scotland parishes

=== Other churches nearby ===
- Kelvinside Hillhead Parish Church (Church of Scotland)
- Knightswood St. Margaret's Parish Church (Church of Scotland)
- St. John's Renfield Church (Church of Scotland)
- St. Luke's Cathedral (Orthodox)
- St. Mary's Cathedral (Episcopalian)
- Wellington Church (Church of Scotland)
