= Harlan D. Fowler =

Aeronautical engineer and inventor

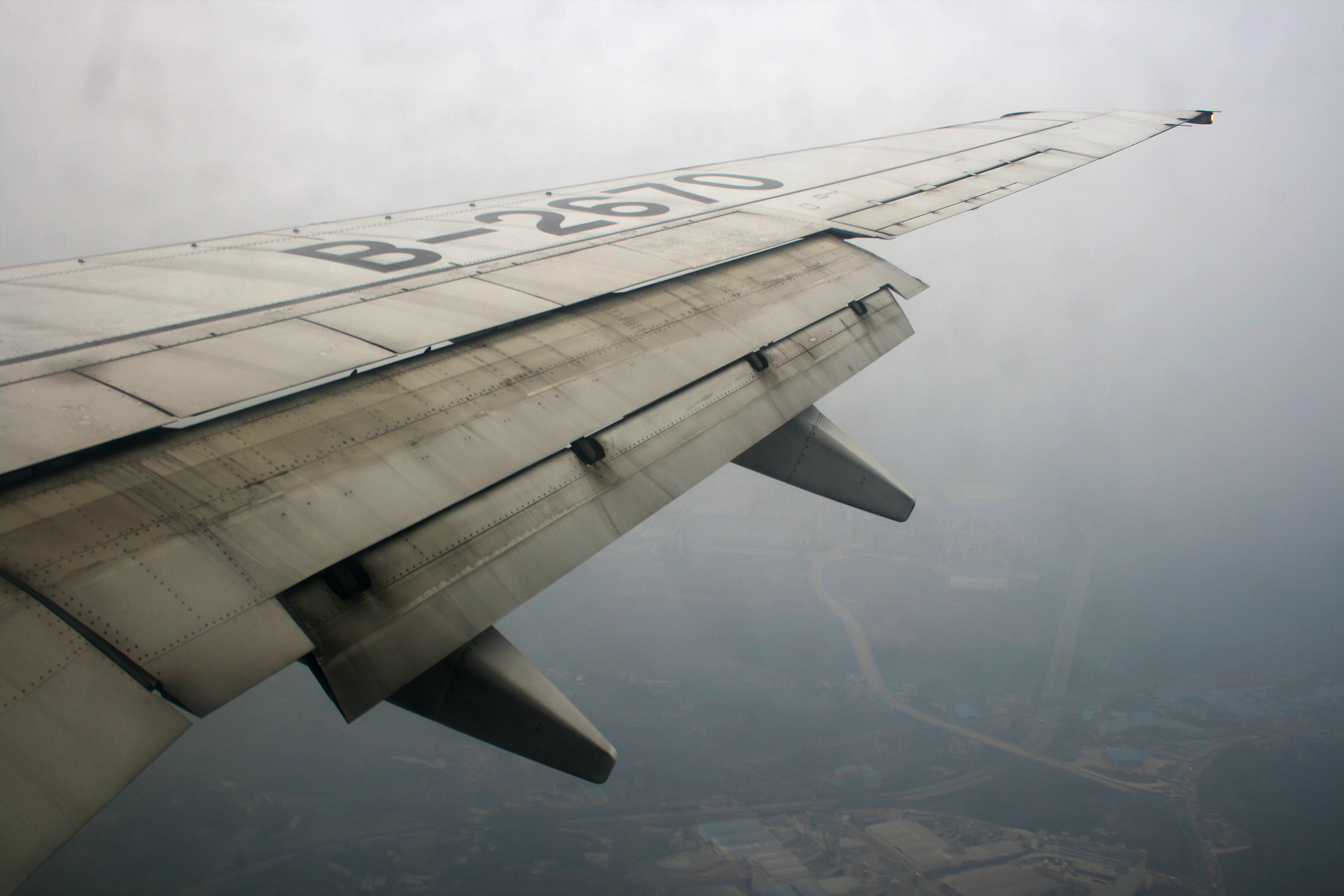
- Double slotted Fowler flaps extended for landing
- Born: June 18, 1895; Sacramento, California
- Died: April 27, 1982 (aged 86); Solvang, CA
- Occupations: Aeronautical engineer and inventor
- Known for: Fowler flap
- Spouse(s): Edith Shoemaker (m.1924, div.1935), Dorothy Newkirk (m. 1935, died 1980)
- Children: 2, including Virginia Kostel, Joan L. Fiorentino
- Parent(s): Dr Charles E. Fowler; Carrie D. Fowler
- Awards: John Price Wetherill Medal

Harlan D. Fowler (1895-1982) was an American inventor, writer, and airplane engineer who invented the variable wing area Fowler flap used on many commercial aircraft today.

== Fowler flap ==
Fowler flap diagram

The Fowler flap combines a translation and a rotation. The flap splits and slides backwards, then rotates down creating one or more slots. These movements increase the wing's curvature which increases cord and camber. The high-lift Fowler flap is located on the trailing edge of an airplane wing which increases wing area, lift, and drag. The flap often forms part of the upper surface of the wing similar to a plain flap or a split flap, but upon extension it slides rearward before lowering. Fowler flaps always feature one or more slots. The Fowler flap complex movement requires special guidance systems on the lower surface, called "flap rails". The Fowler flap itself can be in several parts, with several slots.

Starting in the summer of 1927 with mechanic Stanley Crowfoot, Fowler privately designed, tested, and funded the development of the Fowler flap. Testing by Fred Weick at the National Advisory Committee for Aeronautics (NACA) realized the Fowler flap would reduce landing speed, decrease landing and take-off runs, and improve climbing ability. The first aircraft to use the Fowler flap included the Martin 146 prototype in 1935, the German Fieseler Fi 97, and the Lockheed Super Electra in 1937. Other early adopters of the Fowler flap included the Boeing B-17, B-29, and Lockheed P-38 Lightning. Many modern commercial aircraft use Fowler flaps. In 1948 Fowler published the text, Fowler Flaps for Airplanes: An Engineering Handbook.

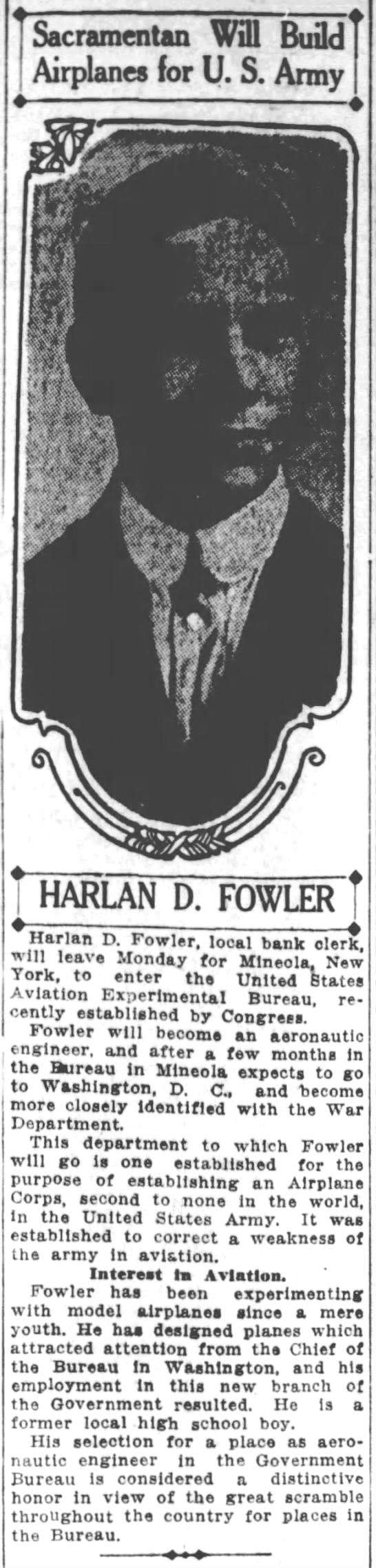
Harlan D. Fowler, local bank clerk will become aeronautical engineer

== Life ==
Born Harlan Davey Fowler on June 18, 1895 in Sacramento, California. As a teenager he built Man-lifting kites. He married twice and had two children. Fowler's aeronautical engineer career started in 1917 with the Signal Corps and he worked in the engineering division as assistant engineer in charge of design at McCook Field in Dayton, OH. Fowler was an independent aeronautical consultant for: Fokker, Glenn L. Martin, Convair, Douglas Aircraft, the Bureau of Aeronautics, and the U.S. Air Force.

From 1922 to 1925 Fowler worked with G Elias & Brother of Buffalo, NY, the Aeromarine Plane and Motor Company, and the Naval Aircraft Factory where he worked on the airship USS Shenandoah (ZR-1). Also he worked at Pitcairn Aircraft Company designing the Mailwing. In 1928 Fowler worked as the Chief Aeronautical engineer for John M. Miller III of the Miller Aviation Corporation of New Brunswick, NJ.

In May 1929, Fowler started the Fowler Airplane Wings Inc. hoping to market his Fowler flap just prior to the Wall Street Crash of 1929. Fowler started his own company purchasing $50,000 of new shares on 17 December 1941, not to be confused with the WWI company Fowler Airplane Corporation, he became president of the Fowler Aircraft Company from the insolvent Hardman Aircraft Products Inc. of San Diego, CA.

Despite having hearing difficulties and used a hearing aid, he continually lobbied the NACA with multiple ideas to improve aircraft. NACA engineer Ken Mort would help Fowler build models and test many of his aeronautical concepts. Ahead of his time, Fowler developed his flap designed when airplanes were still covered with fabric. Harlan Fowler retired in 1975 and died on April 27, 1982. His original research papers including technical reports, blueprints, original data, drawings, photographs, models of the Fowler flap, and air cargo container models are archived at San Jose State University. San Jose State University's Harlan D. Fowler Memorial Scholarship is named in his honor. He holds at least four patents.

Patent: Name, Number, Issued,
Variable-area wing (Fowler flap)	Pat. No. 1392005	Issued: 1921
Cargo Container for Airplanes	Pat. No. 2442459	Issued: 1948
Convertible VTOL Aircraft	Pat. No. 3093347	Issued: 1963
Convertible VTOL Aircraft	Pat. No. 3312426	Issued: 1967

== Works ==
Published works by Fowler include:

- Harlan D. Fowler, Fowler flaps for airplanes, an engineering handbook, Los Angeles, Wetzel Publications, 6 May 1948
- Harlan Davey Fowler, Camels to California: A Chapter in Western Transportation, Vol. 7, Stanford University Press,1950, 93 p..
- Harlan Davey Fowler, Three caravans to Yuma: the untold story of Bactrian camels in western America, AH Clark Co.,1980, 173 p. ( ISBN 0-87062-131-9, ISBN 978-0-87062-131-4 ).
- Harlan Davey Fowler, Behold the Flaming Sword: Biography of John and Jesus, Vantage Press,1983 ( ISBN 0-533-05059-6, ISBN 978-0-53305-059-8 ).
