= Won Ju Lim =

American artist

- Born: 1968 (age 57–58); Gwangju., South Korea
- Education: Woodbury University (B.S), Art Center College of Design (M.F.A)
- Known for: installation art, mixed media sculpture and painting
- Notable work: Elysian Field (2001); 24 Seconds of Silence (2008); Raycraft Is Dead (2014)
- Movement: Contemporary art

Won Ju Lim (born 1968) is an American artist. She currently divides her time between Los Angeles, CA and Boston, MA.

== Career ==
Lim received her B.S. from Woodbury University in 1992, and her M.F.A from Art Center College of Design in 1998.

Lim's multi-media practice examines the dialogue between real and imaginary space as they relate to fantasy, memory and longing, as well as the various transformations that can occur in the connection between a space and its perception. She works with materials including foam-core modules, architectural maquettes, light installations and video projections.

She uses Plexiglas to create three-dimensional miniaturist landscapes, resulting architectural forms, which are illuminated by image projectors from within. Her mixed media installations immerse the viewer in a world of colors, shadows and light, fantasy and nostalgia.

Structures are used simultaneously as screens and light refractive lenses, creating shadows and distorting projections on the walls of the gallery. Works like Ruined Traces (2007), 24 Seconds of Silence (2008), Upside Down Huntington (2005), Upside Down Wilmington (2005), Elysian Field (2001) and Schliemann's Troy (2001) are all examples of such installations.

Claudine Isé, lecturer at School of the Art Institute of Chicago, in one of her writings concerning art, futuristic building projects and concepts, has related Lim's Elysian Field to other artists like Dike Blair, Marco Brambilla, Sabine Hornig, Luisa Lambri, Sarah Morris, Deborah Stratman and Amy Wheeler.

In addition to exhibiting in group and solo shows in the United States, Canada, Europe and Asia, Lim has been participated in the Munster Sculpture Biennial (2001), the Gwangju Biennale (2002), and the Incheon Women's Biennale (2007). In 2018, the San Jose Museum of Art will present California Dreamin', a solo exhibition of her work.

Since 2016, Lim has been an Assistant Professor and the Chair of Sculpture in Graduate Studies at Boston University. She is represented by Haines Gallery in San Francisco, CA; Patrick Painter Inc. in Los Angeles, CA; and Galerie Max Hetzler (Berlin, Germany).

== Selected exhibitions ==
- California Dreamin', solo exhibition; and The House Imaginary, group exhibition, San Jose Museum of Art, CA (2018)
- Through That Which Is Seen, group exhibition at Palo Alto Art Center, CA (2018)
- COLA20, group exhibition at Los Angeles Municipal Art Gallery (LAMAG), CA (2017)
- Casting, solo exhibition at Haines Gallery, San Francisco, CA (2017)
- Raycraft Is Dead, solo exhibition at Yerba Buena Center for the Arts, San Francisco, CA (2015)
- Environmental Impact: Selections from the Frederick R. Weisman Art Foundation, group exhibition at Frederick R. Weissman Museum of Art, Pepperdine University, Malibu, CA; and Carnegie Art Museum, Oxnard, CA (2015)
- Raycraft Is Dead, solo exhibition at Saint Louis Art Museum, Saint Louis, MO (2014)
- In Residence: Contemporary Artists in Dartmouth, group exhibition at Hood Museum of Art, Hanover, NH (2014)
- MoCA's Permanent Collection: A Selection of Recent Acquisitions, group exhibition at Museum of Contemporary Art, Los Angeles, CA (2013)
- Dialogue: Art/Architecture, Los Angeles/Paris, group exhibition at MAK Center for Art and Architecture; and ForYourArt, Los Angeles, CA
- Vitrines, solo exhibition at Patrick Painter Inc., Santa Monica, CA (2013)
- Untitled Silence, solo exhibition at Jaffe-Fried Gallery, Dartmouth College, Hanover, NH (2011)
- Light Fiction, group exhibition at Kunsthalle Detroit, MI (2011)
- Baroque Pet Shop, solo exhibition at Patrick Painter Inc, Santa Monica, CA (2010)
- Second Nature: The Valentine-Adelson Collection at the Hammer, group exhibition at UCLA Hammer Museum, Los Angeles, CA (2009)
- For Excellence: 11 Korean American Artists in America, group exhibition at Museum of Art, Seoul, South Korea (2009)
- 24 Seconds of Silence, solo exhibition at Ullens Center for Contemporary Art, Beijing, China (2008)
- Refraction/Reflection, solo exhibition at Korean Cultural Center, Los Angeles, CA (2007)
- International Incheon Women Artists' Biennale: Found Out, Incheon, South Korea (2007)
- In Many Things to Come, solo exhibition at Honolulu Academy of Arts, Honolulu, HI (2006)
- Lichkunst aus Kunstlicht, group exhibition at ZKM Museum für Neue Kunst, Karlsruhe, Germany (2005)
- Won Ju Lim, solo exhibition at DA2 Domus Artium, Center of Contemporary Art, Salamanca, Spain (2005)
- Ein-Leuchten, group exhibition at Museum der Moderne, Salzburg, Austria (2004)
- Elysian Field North, solo exhibition at Vancouver Art Gallery, BC, Canada (2002)
- Gwangju Biennale 2002: Sites of Korean Diaspora, Gwangju, South Korea (2002)
- Münster Sculpture Biennial, Münster, Germany (2001)
- Snapshot: New Art from Los Angeles, group exhibition at UCLA Hammer Museum, Los Angeles, CA; and Museum of Contemporary Art, North Miami, FL (2001)
- Won Ju Lim: Longing for Wilmington, solo exhibition at Künstlerhaus Bethanien, Berlin, Germany (2000)

== Awards and recognition ==
Lim is the recipient of several grants and awards, including the Philip Morris Artist Grant (2002); an Emerging Artist Fellowship from the California Community Foundation (2004); Korean Arts Foundation of America for the Visual Arts (2005); a Media Arts Fellowship from the Rockefeller Foundation (2007); Creative Capital Fund (2014); and C.O.L.A. Individual Artist Fellowship (2016).

She was also invited to be an Artist-in-Residence at Dartmouth College in 2011.

== Public collections ==
Institutions that collect Lim's work include San Jose Museum of Art, CA; Guy and Myriam Ullens Foundation, Geneva, Switzerland; T-B A21, Vienna, Austria; ULCA Hammer Museum, Los Angeles, CA; Museum of Contemporary Art, Los Angeles, CA; M+ Museum, Hong Kong, China; Vancouver Art Gallery, Canada; Honolulu Academy of Arts, Honolulu, CA; and La Colección Jumex, Estado de México.
