= Johnny Miller (disambiguation) =

Johnny Miller (born 1947) is an American former professional golfer.

Johnny Miller may also refer to:

- Johnny Miller (racing driver) (born 1965), American racecar driver
- Johnny Miller (footballer) (1950–2016), English soccer player
- Johnny Miller (Hidden Palms), fictional character
- Johnny Miller (aviator) (1905–2008), American aircraft pilot
- Johnny Miller (American football) (born 1954), American football player
- Johnny R. Miller, Assistant Adjutant General of the Illinois Army National Guard
- Johnny Miller, bassist with the King Cole Trio

== See also ==
- Jonny Lee Miller (born 1972), British actor
- John Miller (disambiguation)
- Jonathan Miller (disambiguation)
