= Christoph Schmidberger =

Austrian-American painter (born 1974)

Christoph Schmidberger (born 1974 in Eisenerz, Austria) is a painter based in Los Angeles. He studied from 1989 to 1994 at the Higher Technical College of Graphic Art in Graz, Austria, and graduated with an Honours and Master of Art from the Academy of Fine Arts in Vienna in 2002.

His works, drawn or painted in a hyperreal style, typically use traditional compositional forms (woodland scenes, reclining lovers, portraits with pets, etc.) to portray youthful eroticised figures relaxing in modern suburban settings. ("Christoph Schmidberger paints a kitschy dream of pre-Raphaelite surrender, revelling in pornography's influence on today's sexual economy").

Schmidberger's work has been shown internationally at galleries and museums such as the Museum of Contemporary Art San Diego, the Frederick R. Weisman Museum of Art in California, the Landesmuseum Joanneum (Joanneum National Museum) in Graz, Austria, and the Royal Academy in London. His work features in several important collections including the Saatchi Gallery, the Museum of Fine Arts, Boston, the Los Angeles County Museum of Art, the Joslyn Museum of Art, and Österreichische Galerie Belvedere.

He is represented by Patrick Painter Inc. in Santa Monica, California, and Union Gallery in London.

== Selected Public Collections ==
- Museum Of Fine Arts, Boston, MA
- The Saatchi Collection, London
- Los Angeles County Museum Of Art, Los Angeles, CA
- Museum Of Contemporary Art, San Diego, CA
- Joslyn Museum Of Art, Omaha, NE
- Frederic R. Weismann Collection, Los Angeles, CA
- Neue Galerie Am Landesmuseum Joanneum, Graz
- Korban Art Foundation, New York
- Vanhaerents Art Collection, Brüssels
- Volpinum Kunstsammlung, Vienna

== Bibliography ==
- Christoph Schmidberger, Levander Fields Forever, Mark Moore Gallery, Santa Monica, 2003.
- Christoph Schmidberger, Michele Robecchi, The Beginning of the End, Brand New Gallery, Milan, 2011.
