= Adelbert Althouse =

United States Navy Captain

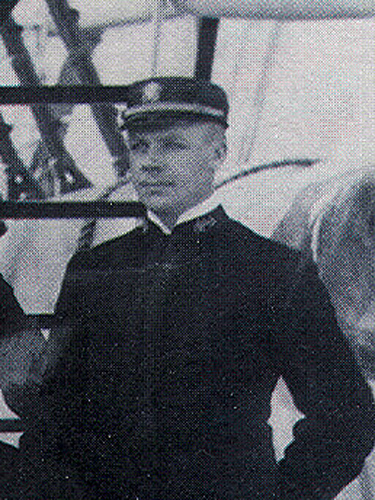

29th Naval Governor of Guam
- In office December 14, 1922 – August 4, 1923
- Preceded by: John P. Miller
- Succeeded by: Henry Bertram Price

27th Naval Governor of Guam
- In office February 7, 1922 – December 8, 1922
- Preceded by: James Sutherland Spore
- Succeeded by: John P. Miller

Personal details
- Born: May 23, 1869 Channahon, Illinois
- Died: May 17, 1954 (aged 84)
- Education: United States Naval Academy

Military service
- Allegiance: United States
- Branch/service: United States Navy
- Rank: Captain
- Commands: USS Brooklyn
- Battles/wars: Spanish–American War; World War I
- Awards: Navy Cross

Adelbert Althouse (May 23, 1869 – May 17, 1954) was a United States Navy Captain who served as the 27th and 29th Naval Governor of Guam. Prior to his Governorship, he served on ships in the Navy and participated in both the Spanish–American War and World War I. He earned the Navy Cross for his actions commanding USS Brooklyn and serving as Chief of Staff for the Commander and Chief of the United States Asiatic Fleet during the World War. As Governor, he focused on reforming the island's education system. He modeled a new system after that of co-educational California but also outlawed the speaking of the Chamorro language at schools in an effort to improve the English language skills of the local children. Most of his education reform took place in his first term.

== Life and legacy ==
Althouse was born in 1869 in Illinois. He died on May 17, 1954. In 1930, the Navy named a Guamanian school, the Adelbert Althouse School, after him.

== Naval career ==
Althouse entered the United States Naval Academy on May 21, 1887, graduating in 1891. He was commissioned as an ensign on July 1, 1893. He achieved the rank of lieutenant in 1900. The same year, he served aboard USS New Orleans.

As a lieutenant, he served as a watch and division officer aboard USS Massachusetts. During this time, he participated in the Spanish–American War. In 1901, the navy assigned him to USS Constellation. As a lieutenant commander, he served as navigating officer aboard USS Vermont.

During World War I, Althouse served as chief of staff to the commander in chief of the United States Asiatic Fleet and commanded USS Brooklyn, for which he received the Navy Cross. He retired with the rank of Captain.

== Governorship ==
Althouse served two terms as Naval Governor of Guam; he served his first term from February 7, 1922, to December 8, 1922. During his first term, he made significant changes to the Guamanian education system. In an effort to promote the spread of English among local children, he burned a large number of Chamorro-English dictionaries and banned the use of Chamorro in the classroom and on playgrounds. Due to a shortage of classrooms, classrooms were made co-educational. He based the new system on the educational system of California and demanded that teachers stick to a rigid syllabus. His second term took place from December 14, 1922, to August 4, 1923.
