= John H. Miller Jr. =

American Physicist

John Harris Miller, Jr.
- Born: United States
- Education: Northwestern University (B.S.); University of Illinois at Urbana-Champaign (Ph.D)
- Known for: Charge density wave Impedance spectroscopy of living organisms
- Scientific career
- Fields: Physics; Electronics
- Workplaces: University of Illinois; University of North Carolina at Chapel Hill; University of Houston
- Doctoral advisor: John Bardeen; J. R. Tucker

John Harris Miller Jr. is an American physicist with important contributions to the fields of physics, biophysics, Impedance spectroscopy, and material science, mainly known for his role in Charge density wave (in explaining the collective quantum transport of electrons in charge density waves), research work on Cuprates and Impedance spectroscopy of living organisms. He is particularly known for an effect "Collective Quantum Tunneling of CDW Electrons" and for a well-known paper on the topic written by him and his colleagues, as published in Physical Review Letters. He was a noteworthy student of the twice Nobel laureate physicist John Bardeen who mentioned him at several places in his biography "True Genius: The Life and Science of John Bardeen" (John Bardeen) (particularly in Chapter 15 of the book which discusses the work which Miller carried out under the guidance of Bardeen and J. R. Tucker).

== Biography ==
Miller grew up in the Sangre de Cristo Mountains of northern New Mexico. His family lived in the small resort town of Red River. His parents were owners of the small beginner ski area at the Powder Puff mountain, and later Enchanted Forest Cross Country Ski Area. He attended school in Questa, New Mexico, where many descendants of the original Spanish conquistadores live, some speaking a sixteenth-century dialect of Spanish. He was a slalom, giant slalom, and downhill ski racer, first on the Red River and later on the Taos ski teams. While an undergraduate, he was a member of the Northwestern University Ski Team, acting as both captain and coach during one season.

After completing his high school, Miller completed his bachelor's degree in electrical engineering at Northwestern University (1980) and his doctorate, in 1985, from the University of Illinois at Urbana-Champaign in physics, under J. R. Tucker and John Bardeen as his advisors. His PhD project was a combined experimental-theoretical study of quantum transport of electrons in Charge density waves, as one of the last students to work with Bardeen, who was the co-inventor of the transistor and the only recipient of two Nobel laurels in physics (his second Nobel prize awarded for the BCS theory of superconductivity).

Soon after completion of his PhD, he was awarded a prestigious IBM Postdoctoral fellowship at the University of Illinois. He joined the University of North Carolina at Chapel Hill in 1986 as an assistant professor of physics, where he remained till 1989, before joining the University of Houston, Department of Physics faculty, where he continues as a full professor of physics, in addition to being the director, HTS Device, Biophysics, and Charge Transport Lab at the Texas Center for Superconductivity at University of Houston. He has held the adjunct assistant professorship of pediatric cardiology at the Baylor College of Medicine, from 1994 to 2004. In 1987 he was selected for and awarded the Alfred P. Sloan Research Fellowship.

== Scientific contributions ==
While exploring biomedical applications of novel superconducting devices (such as SQUIDs and SQUID-based sensitive magnetometers) at the University of Houston, he laid down the foundations of a Biophysics research group in association with researchers in the Texas Medical Center (TMC) in the mid 1990s. The group has expanded and evolved significantly since then, to develop new techniques and devices to study various living organisms. His group's work on the dielectric properties of living cells and organelles led to studying the electromagnetic properties of living cells and creating collaborations with TMC researchers (including Dale Hamilton, MD) to develop electromagnetic biosensors to detect metabolic activity in mitochondria, as related to various human conditions such as obesity and its complications (under various grants funded by the National Institutes of Health with Miller as their P.I.). This led also to group's various theoretical efforts, such as development of electric field-driven torque models of the mitochondrial motor ATP synthase and efforts to understand mechanisms of disease-implicated mitochondrial mutations in the Electron transport chain, as well as reports of measurement of intrinsic electromagnetic activity and noise from living yeast cells in their best metabolic conditions.

His group has also been involved with computational studies of localization of electron holes in the DNA, finding a correlation between sites of hole localization and nucleotide positions of human mutations in mitochondrial DNA. This has led to a (experimental as yet) computational DNA hole spectroscopy method, which they discuss in a publication, in collaboration with the reputed UH evolutionary biologist Ricardo Azevedo.

Miller in association with his colleagues has recently proposed the idea of "Martian soil Biosensors" based on their developed techniques of dielectric spectroscopy.

== Noteworthy students/Post-docs ==
- James R. Claycomb, PhD, professor, Dept. of Mathematics and Physics, Houston Baptist University
- Camelia Prodan, PhD, associate professor, Dept. of Physics, New Jersey Institute of Technology
- Hugo Sanabria, PhD, assistant professor and director, Single-Molecule Biophysics Group, Department of Physics and Astronomy, Clemson University
- Dharmakeerthi Nawarathna, PhD, assistant professor, Dept. of Electrical and Computer Engineering, North Dakota State University
- Masroor H. S. Bukhari, PhD, visiting professor, Higher Education Commission of Pakistan, University Malaya and the Thomas Jefferson National Accelerator Facility
- Andrew W. Beckwith, Ph.D., visiting scholar, CQU · School of Physics

== Honors, awards and patents ==
- 1982-1983 General Electric Foundation Predoctoral Fellowship, Illinois
- 1984-1985 AT&T Bell Laboratories Predoctoral Scholarship, Illinois
- 1985-1986 IBM Postdoctoral Fellowship, Illinois
- 1987-1991 Alfred P. Sloan Research Fellowship
- Three U.S. and two foreign patents.

== Memberships ==
- American Physical Society, Divisions of Condensed Matter and Biological Physics;
- APS Topical Group on Quantum Information
- The Biophysical Society
- Houston Society of Engineering in Medicine and Biology
