= Jonathan Miller (disambiguation) =

Jonathan Miller (1934–2019) was an English physician, theatre and opera director and television presenter.

Jonathan or Jon Miller may also refer to:

== Arts and entertainment ==
- Jon Miller (TV presenter) (1921–2008), British television presenter
- Jon Miller (television executive) (born 1956), American television executive
- Jonny Lee Miller (born 1972), British actor
- Jonathan Miller (fl. 1993), American singer, founder of Chicago a cappella
- Jon Miller (guitarist), American musician, bassist in the band DevilDriver

== Politics and law ==
- Jonathan Miller (abolitionist) (1797–1847), American abolitionist and politician
- Jonathan Miller (Kentucky politician) (born 1967), American politician, Secretary for the Kentucky Finance and Administration Cabinet
- Jonathan Miller (West Virginia politician) (born 1984), American politician in the West Virginia House of Delegates

== Sports ==
- Jon Miller (born 1951), American sportscaster
- Jonathan K. Miller (1899–1971), American college football player and coach
- J. T. Miller (Jonathan T. Miller, born 1993), American NHL ice hockey player

== Others ==
- Jonathan Miller (businessman) (born 1957), American businessman, chairman and CEO of AOL

== See also ==
- John Miller (disambiguation)
- Johnny Miller (disambiguation)
- Miller (name)
