= All Saints Church, Jordanhill =

All Saints' Church
- The Parish Church of All Saints
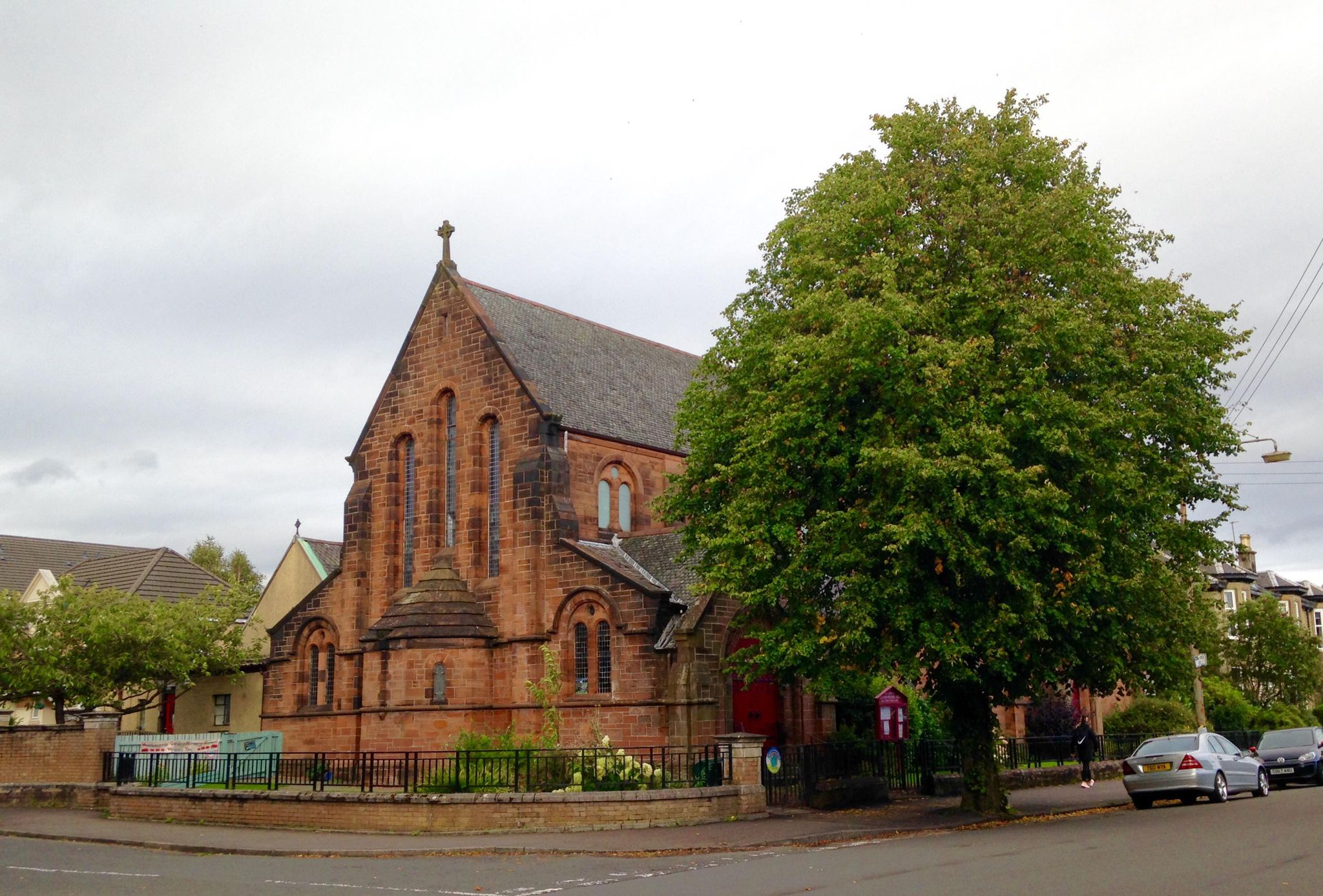
- All Saints' Church
- 55°53′07″N 4°19′38″W
- Location: Glasgow
- Country: Scotland
- Denomination: Scottish Episcopal Church
- Website: Church Website

History
- Status: Active
- Dedication: All Saints
- Dedicated: 1 November 1904

Architecture
- Functional status: Parish church
- Architect: James Chalmers
- Architectural type: Church
- Style: Neo-Norman
- Groundbreaking: 26 March 1904

Specifications
- Materials: Red ashlar

Administration
- Diocese: Glasgow and Galloway
- Parish: All Saints

Clergy
- Bishop: Kevin Pearson

Listed Building – Category B
- Designated: 15 December 1970
- Reference no.: LB32346

All Saints' Church is a Parish church of the Scottish Episcopal Church located in the Jordanhill area of Glasgow, Scotland.

== History ==
All Saints' traces its beginnings to 1853, when Jane Charlotte Smith founded a school for miners and other labourers who lived in the Jordanhill area. Jordanhill Mansion, Jane's own home, was initially used for these gatherings, and then they were moved to a barn where Episcopalian services were held as well. In 1861, Jane founded a chapel school for children, while church services continued to be held by visiting priests. By 1892, a curate was appointed to minister in Jordanhill.

Work on the current church was begun in 1904 when the foundation stone was laid on 26 March 1904. The church was dedicated on 1 November 1904 by Bishop Ean Campbell of Glasgow.

== Works of art ==
The church was designed by James Chalmers. Chalmers chose a cruciform Neo-Norman style, and added a nave, aisles and transepts. Stugged red ashlar was used to build the church.

The interior is adorned with a number of carved oak reredos, designed by Sir Robert Lorimer. Some were painted by Phoebe Anna Traquair, one of two examples of her work in Glasgow. The church also includes a total of nine stained glass windows. The Triple Oriel east window was installed in 1911 and dedicated to the memory of Jane Charlotte Smith, which depicts Christ in Majesty.
