= Gwyn Singleton =

Scottish dyslexia pioneer

- Born: Gwynifer Begbie; 1933; Edinburgh
- Died: 21 September 2021; Aylesbury
- Education: Jordanhill College Open University
- Known for: spelling dictionary and pioneering support for children with dyslexia

Gwyn Singleton nee Gwynifer Begbie,(1933–2021) was a Scottish pioneer of educational support for dyslexia. She published a spelling dictionary and associated teaching aids for children with dyslexia, based on an aural coding system, with David Moseley and founded Dyslexia ScotWest support group for families with children with dyslexia.

== Life ==
Born Gwynifer Begbie in Edinburgh 1933, to mother Ena Davis-Jones, a teacher and her father J. Mouland Begbie, the leader of the BBC Scottish Symphony Orchestra, she also had a sister Margot.

The family moved to Glasgow where she attended Laurel Bank School and Jordanhill Teacher Training College. Her first job was in Haggs Hill School, Glasgow. In 1959, she married Ronald Singleton and later divorced. She had four children Julia, Hilary, Gregor and Clare.

In the 1980s, she helped to found a group to support families affected by dyslexia in the west of Scotland (Dyslexia ScotWest) and completed a degree in education, at the Open University. She moved to Newcastle, teaching at Nunnykirk specialist school with her new partner David Moseley, and together they published a spelling dictionary, designed for dyslexic children and created associated freely available worksheets, which were commended by the Dyslexia Association. This became a recommended resource for use in Scottish education authorities, with Stirling Council including it in its "advice and good practice in supporting dyslexia".

Singleton retired, and later died aged 87, in Aylesbury, on 21 September 2021.
