= Gordon Smith (cricketer) =

Scottish cricketer and educator

Personal information
- Full name: Gordon Murray Smith
- Born: 3 April 1949 (age 77); Glasgow, Lanarkshire, Scotland
- Batting: Right-handed
- Bowling: Right-arm fast-medium

Domestic team information
- Years: Team
- 1980: Scotland

Career statistics
Competition	List A
Matches	3
Runs scored	0
Batting average	–
100s/50s	–/–
Top score	0*
Balls bowled	72
Wickets	0
Bowling average	–
5 wickets in innings	–
10 wickets in match	–
Best bowling	–
Catches/stumpings	–/–
- Source: Cricinfo, 1 July 2022

Gordon Murray Smith (born 3 April 1949) is a Scottish former cricketer and educator.

Smith was born at Glasgow in April 1949 and later studied at Jordanhill College. A club cricketer for the West of Scotland Cricket Club, Smith played in three List A one-day matches for Scotland in the 1980 Benson & Hedges Cup, making his debut at Glasgow against Leicestershire in what was Scotland's inaugural List A match; his following two appearances came against Derbyshire at Glasgow, and Lancashire at Old Trafford. As a bowler in the Scottish side, Smith struggled against first-class county opposition, going wicketless in his three matches. Outside of cricket, Smith was by profession a schoolteacher. In 2012, he was president of the West of Scotland Cricket Club.
