= Jordanhill =

Area of Glasgow, Scotland

Coordinates: 55.883789°N 4.338894°W

Jordanhill: Scottish Gaelic: Cnoc Iòrdain; Scots: Jordanhull
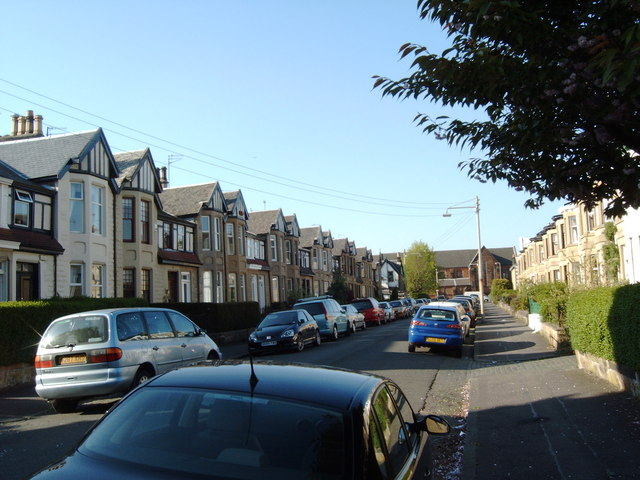

- Location within Glasgow
- OS grid reference: NS538681
- Council area: Glasgow City Council
- Lieutenancy area: Glasgow
- Country: Scotland
- Sovereign state: United Kingdom
- Post town: GLASGOW
- Postcode district: G13
- Dialling code: 0141
- Police: Scotland
- Fire: Scottish
- Ambulance: Scottish
- UK Parliament: Glasgow West
- Scottish Parliament: Glasgow Anniesland

Jordanhill (Scots: Jordanhull, Scottish Gaelic: Cnoc Iòrdain) is an affluent area of the West End of the city of Glasgow, Scotland. The area consists largely of terraced housing dating from the early to mid 20th century, with some detached and semi-detached homes and some modern apartments.

Jordanhill College of Education and then the University of Strathclyde faculty of education were formerly in the area and the associated school has a high reputation.

== History ==
The area was previously part of the Jordanhill Estate within the parish of Renfrew centred on Jordanhill House.

=== Jordanhill Estate:1546-1913 ===
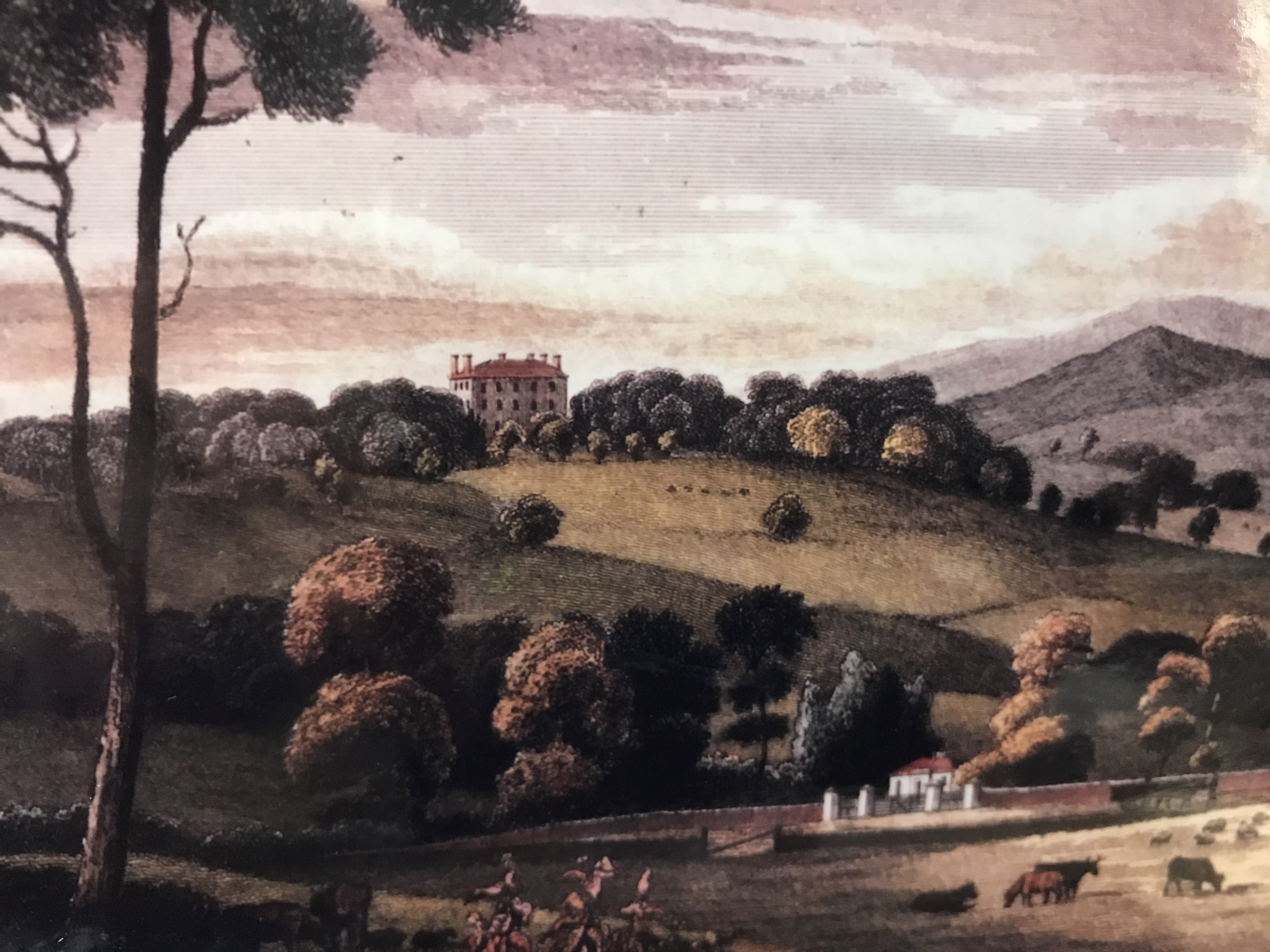
Early nineteenth century print of Jordanhill House, the seat of James Smith, Esq

==== Crawfords of Jordanhill ====
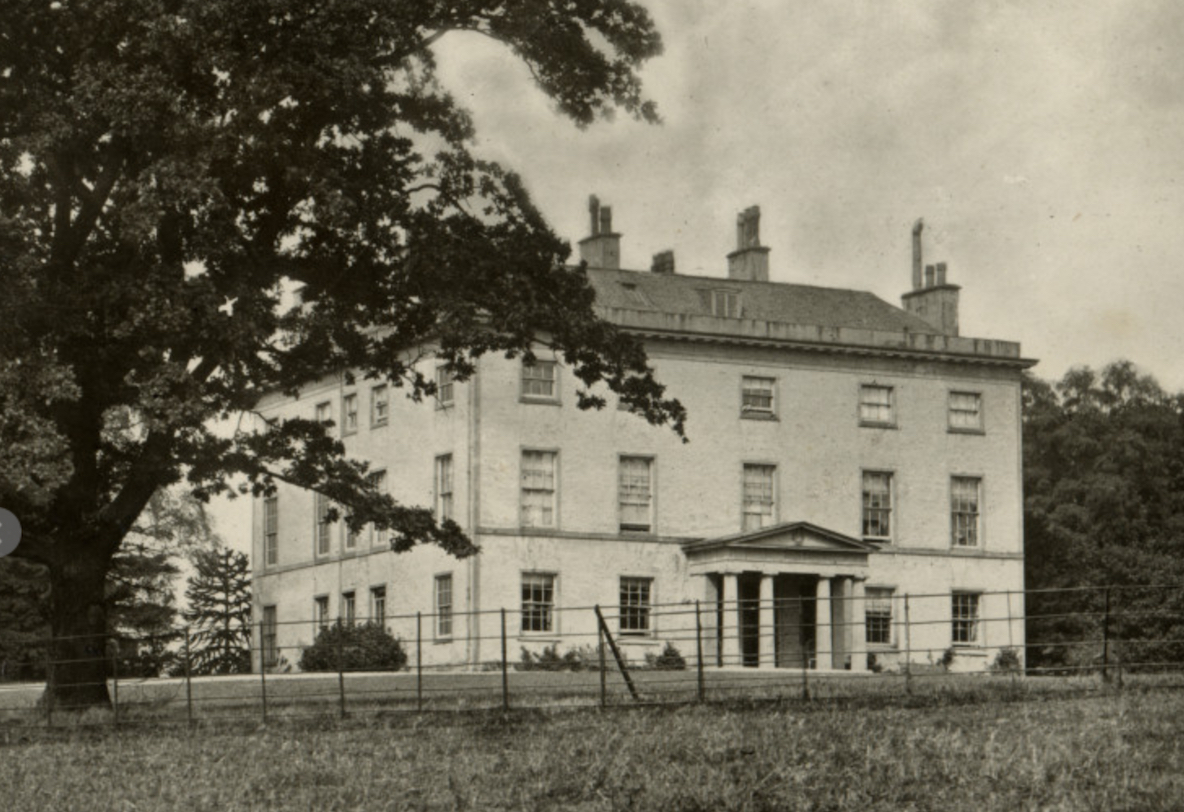
Jordanhill House, Renfrewshire, Scotland, about 1888 and following the improvements by James Smith of Jordanhill

In 1546 Lawrence Crawford of Kilbirnie founded a chaplainry at Drumry, and to sustain it endowed it with the freehold ownership of land at Jordanhill, which then accumulated rent at a rate of £5 per annum. His sixth son Thomas Crawford was a soldier who led the 1571 capture of Dumbarton Castle, who had previously acquired the lands at Jordanhill from the chaplain of Drumry in 1562. There he built a house, possibly on or close to the foundations of an original hunting lodge. In the 18th century, one of his descendants also called Lawrence Crawford extended and refurbished the old house, and laid out the original garden scheme and associated orchards.

==== Houstons of Jordanhill ====
In 1750 the Crawford family sold the estate to Tobacco Lords Alexander Houston, whose family was also forced to sell the estate in 1800 after his business got into trouble, to James Smith of merchants Smith & Leitch.

==== Smiths of Jordanhill ====
James Smith of Jordanhill (1782-1867)

The third son of a Tobacco Lord from Craigend, James's two elder brothers having travelled to Virginia and North Carolina in the 1760s had noted the growing civil uprising warning of the forthcoming American War of Independence, and refocused their family's merchant business on trade with the West Indies. By the early 19th century, and after the death of their father, all three sons could afford to retire. As third son, James had no access to the family's landed estate, and so bought Jordanhill for £14,000 in 1800. He then spent a further £4,000 extending and modernising the manor house. By 1809, the estate was sustained by its four associated farms of Whiteinch, Windyedge, Woodend and Anniesland. Having married Mary Wilson that year (granddaughter of Alexander Wilson and niece of Patrick Wilson), Smith improved access to the main house by gravelling the road to the Anniesland toll road, which is now known as Crow Road. In 1821, with four children and a pregnant wife, after the purchase of Gartnavel farm he remodelled the existing house, and also built a stone pillar in direct line between his favourite window in the manor house library and the spire of Renfrew Parish Church. A keen leisure sailor, in 1827 Smith bought the Baths Hotel at Helensburgh. With seven children, after two of his daughters caught tuberculosis, the family relocated temporarily to Portugal and rented out the house for five years. After the death of both daughters, the family returned to the estate in 1846, but in 1847 Mrs. Smith died of pneumonia. Comfortable but with less of a fortune, Smith devoted his remaining twenty years to church works and supporting his children in their endeavours.

After the death of his father in 1866, his son Archibald Smith inherited the by now neglected Jordanhill estate. A qualified barrister who lived in London with his wife and three children, he devoted his spare time to working on the problems of the deviation of the navigational compass associated with the newly developed iron ships. In 1862 he published patents and papers to solve these, which brought him the Gold Medal of the Royal Society. Smith left most of the management of the estate to its staff, which generated £4,500 of income across its core 293-acre (119 ha) holding, of which £3,000 came from the quickly diminishing coal mines and ironstone workings leased on the former farmlands to the Monkland Iron and Steel Co. An 1872 government award of £2,000 for his compass research allowed him to replace the worst houses on the estate with new homes, today known as Compass Cottages in Anniesland Road. On his early death in 1872, to pay off death duties and the accrued debts of the estate, his wife sold of much of the estate's former farmlands for housing development north of the Glasgow, Yoker and Clydebank Railway.

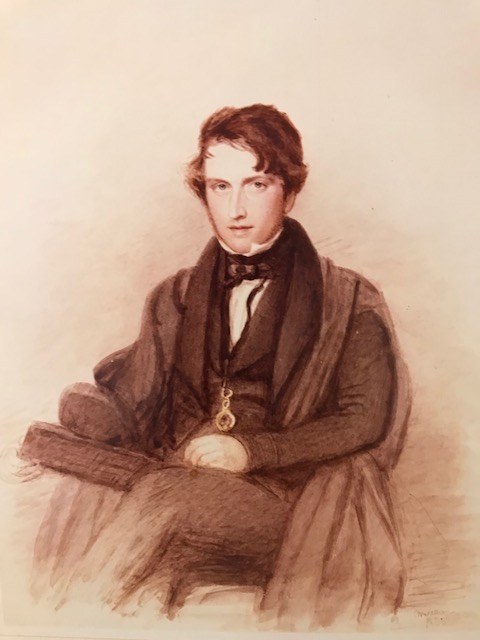
Archibald Smith of Jordanhill, upon graduation at Trinity College, Cambridge (Senior Wrangler)

After his mother's death in 1913, James Parker Smith inherited the estate. Educated at Winchester College and Trinity College, Cambridge, like his father he qualified as a barrister. After marriage to his cousin, he had devoted himself to politics, becoming Liberal Unionist MP for Glasgow Partick in 1890. In January 1900, Smith had been appointed assistant private secretary (unpaid) to Joseph Chamberlain, Secretary of State for the Colonies. After losing his seat in 1906, like his mother he began selling off more pieces of land four housing development, including the former Gartnavel farm to the Royal Lunatic Asylum. Approached by the university which was looking for a site on which to establish a unified teacher training college, in 1913 Parker Smith agreed sale of the residual estate.

Following the death of Archibald Colin Hamilton Smith in Australia on 5 June 1971, the sixth generation of the family who died without issue, the Smith family papers dealing with the Jordanhill Estate were donated to the Glasgow City Archives at the Mitchell Library. Many of the Smith family are buried in the graveyard surrounding Renfrew Parish Church.

On 25 June 2007, Lord Lyon King of Arms recognized Michael Babington Smith, the grandson of Archibald Colin Hamilton Smith as successor to his grandfather as Representer of the House of Smith of Jordanhill and therefore, Michael Babington Smith of Jordanhill.

=== Later history ===
Before the twentieth century, Jordanhill was a poor area, similar to neighbouring Knightswood, with mining for coal at Skaterigg. The building of more affluent residences was coincidental with the expansion of Glasgow and the construction of a commuter railway (similar to Bearsden in the 1870s).

The site of the house was sold to Jordanhill Teacher Training College, and is now the home of the Strathclyde University Faculty Of Education. The area consists largely of terraced housing dating from the early to mid 20th century, with some detached and semi-detached homes and some modern apartments.

Jordanhill, Temple and Knightswood have been linked to stories of the Knights Templar; but there is no evidence for their presence in this area. When asked, the Lord Lyon King of Arms rebutted a proposal to include the Maltese cross of the Knights of St. John in the crest of Jordanhill College. Jordanhill may be related to the family name "Jardine".

== Amenities ==
There are a number of parks in Jordanhill and the immediate vicinity, as well as large playing fields on the Jordanhill Campus. Jordanhill is directly adjacent to Victoria Park, one of the largest green spaces in Glasgow and home to the Fossil Grove, an area of fossilized prehistoric tree stumps.

The area has excellent transport links. Jordanhill railway station has regular local train services to central Glasgow on the North Clyde and Argyle lines, and regular bus services are provided by First Glasgow. The Clyde Tunnel is located nearby, giving road access to the south of the city.

There are two pubs in the area, both are situated on Crow Road, near the railway station.

This area used to be home to a branch of The Jolly Giant Toy Superstores, based on Crow Road.

== Education ==
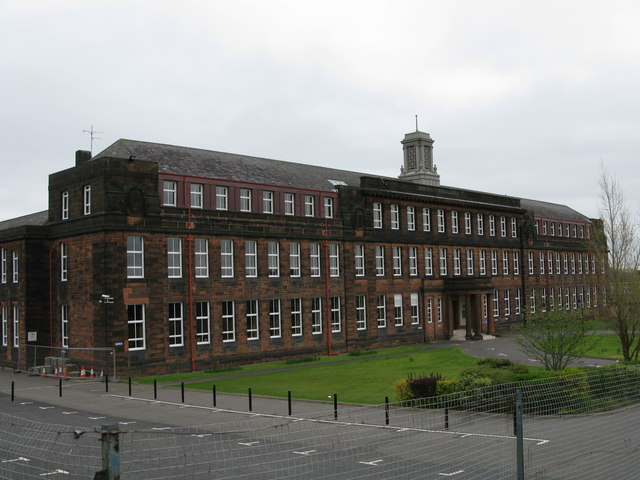
Jordanhill School

Jordanhill School is located on Chamberlain Road at the foot of the hill on which Jordanhill College sits, and was formerly the College's training school. It is now a state comprehensive school. The school is unique in the Scottish state sector in that it contains both Primary and Secondary departments, providing education for children from 4 to 18, and in that it has Grant Maintained status and is independent from local government control. It had previously been an independent demonstration school for Jordanhill College. Private school the High School of Glasgow is also located in the Jordanhill vicinity.

Saint Thomas Aquinas Secondary School is a Catholic secondary school located on Mitre Road in the newer part of Jordanhill. It has several feeder primary schools, including Corpus Christi (Knightswood), Notre Dame (Dowanhill), St Pauls (Whiteinch), St. Peter's (Partick), St. Brendan's (Yoker), St. Patrick's in (Anderston), St. Clare's (Drumchapel) and St. Ninian's (Blairdardie).

== Places of worship ==
There are three churches in Jordanhill, two located on Woodend Drive, off Crow Road: Jordanhill Parish Church (Church of Scotland) and All Saints Church (Episcopalian). Both churches are used for a variety of community and social events, in addition to regular worship, and All Saints is also home to Westbourne Gardens Nursery School. The 72nd and 178th Glasgow Scouts are based in the area, as well as 130th and the 272nd Glasgow Boys' Brigades.

== See also ==
- Hillhead Jordanhill RFC
