= John Miller (literary historian) =

John Miller is a British literary historian. He has worked at the University of Sheffield since 2012.

== Selected publications ==
=== Authored books ===
- Miller, John (2012). Empire and the Animal Body: Violence, Identity and Ecology in Victorian Adventure Fiction. Anthem Press.
- Miller, John, and Louise Miller (2014). Walrus. Reaktion Books.
- Miller, John (2021). The Philosophy of Tattoos. British Library Publishing.
- Miller, John (2022). The Heart of the Forest: Why Woods Matter. British Library Publishing.

=== Edited books ===
- Lyons, Paddy, Willy Maley, and John Miller, eds. (2013). Romantic Ireland from Tone to Gonne: Fresh Perspectives on Nineteenth-Century Ireland. Cambridge Scholars Publishing.
- Miller, John, and Mariangela Palladino, eds. (2015). The Globalization of Space: Foucault and Heterotopia. Routledge.
- Hutchings, Kevin, and John Miller, eds. (2016). Transatlantic Literary Ecologies: Nature and Culture in the Nineteenth-Century Anglophone Atlantic World. Routledge.
- McKay, Robert, and John Miller, eds. (2017). Werewolves, Wolves and the Gothic. University of Wales Press.
- McCorry, Seán, and John Miller, eds. (2019). Literature and Meat Since 1900. Palgrave Macmillan.
- Miller, John, ed. (2019). Tales of the Tattooed: An Anthology of Ink. British Library Publishing.
- Miller, John, ed. (2020). Weird Woods: Tales from the Haunted Forests of Britain. British Library Publishing.
- McHugh, Susan, Robert McKay, and John Miller, eds. (2021). The Palgrave Handbook of Animals and Literature. Palgrave Macmillan.
