= The Jolly Giant =

UK toy shop chain in receivership

Jolly Giant Toy Superstore Limited(The)
- Type: Limited
- Industry: Retail
- Founded: 7 August 1980
- Defunct: 4 October 2002
- Fate: Receivership
- Headquarters: Glasgow, United Kingdom
- Number of locations: 18 (in 1998)
- Area served: United Kingdom
- Products: Toys
- Number of employees: 320 (at the time of 18 stores)

The Jolly Giant Toy Superstores was a chain of large toy shops in the United Kingdom. It was founded in Scotland on 7 August 1980, with headquarters in Rutherglen. The company went into receivership in October 2002.

== Store locations ==
Store locations included:

- Liverpool
- Aberdeen
- Jordanhill
- Edinburgh (Peffermill)
- Rutherglen
- Dunfermline
- Leeds
- Carlisle
- Gateshead (Team Valley)
- Rotherham
- Nottingham
- Lincoln
- Southport
- Chester
- Charlton, London
- Inverness
- Wigan
- Newcastle-under-Lyme
- Wolverhampton
- Blackpool
- Merry Hill, Dudley
