= John Henry Miller (politician) =

American businessman and politician (1848–1907)

John Henry Miller (March 24, 1848 - August 20, 1907) was an American businessman and politician.

== Biography ==
John Henry Miller was born March 24, 1848, near Enfield, Illinois. He was a teacher in Illinois and Indiana for a number of years before becoming a hardware store owner. He later moved to McLeansboro, Illinois and organized People's Bank of McLeansboro. He would serve as the bank's president. He was active in local Republican politics as a county party chairman and member of the state central committee. Miller was elected to the Illinois House in 1900 and 1902. He served as Speaker during his second and last term. He retired rather than run for reelection in 1904. After leaving the legislature, Miller returned to his business pursuits. He died August 20, 1907, in St. Louis, Missouri.
