= Strathclyde Institute of Education =

Scottish tertiary education faculty

Coordinates: 55.884594°N 4.340046°W

Faculty Logo

The Strathclyde Institute of Education is the Education school, and part of the Faculty of Humanities and Social Sciences, at the University of Strathclyde, Glasgow, Scotland.

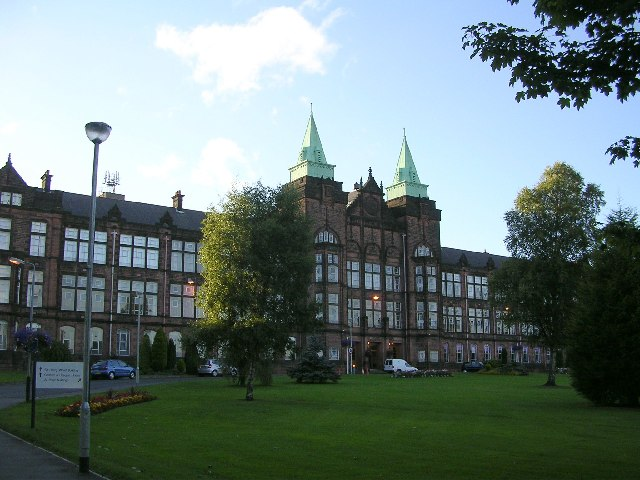
David Stow Building

The Faculty of Education was formed in 1992 when the renowned Jordanhill College of Education (the first institution in Europe to train teachers) made the decision to merge with the University of Strathclyde in order to create a new faculty. The Faculty was launched on 1 April 1993, with its long history in the field of training new teachers; latterly however, it also trained education professionals in the arts, community education, physical education, sport and outdoor education, social work and speech and language therapy.

The Faculty of Education was housed at the Jordanhill campus in the west end of Glasgow until 2012. Since relocating to the city centre campus the faculty became the Institute of Education. The Jordanhill campus housed the largest education research library in Scotland. There were two student residences on campus.

== Departments ==
- Childhood & Primary studies
- Creative & Aesthetic studies
- Curricular Studies
- Education & Professional studies
- Culture, Sport and the Arts
- Glasgow School of Social Work

== Research ==
The department takes part in ongoing research by assisting staff and students in the various research areas and also by making sure they have been fully trained. The university has a very large library.

Students in the department may get the chance to take part in an international Student exchange program which means they will be travelling to another university in Europe. This is due to the department supporting the studying of students in other countries throughout the world.

=== National Centre for Autism Studies ===
The Faculty is home to the National Centre For Autism studies which was established in 2003. The NCAS comprises three strandse in relation to autism - research, practice and teaching - with a multi-disciplinary staff and visiting professors.

=== Childhood and Families ===
The centre for Childhood and Families Research has been operating in the university since 1999.

== Rankings ==
The Strathclyde Institute of Education ranks in the top 2 in Scotland and in the top 3 in the UK. It was ranked 2nd in Scotland in the 2024 and The Guardian University Guide. The Institute ranked 2nd in Scotland and 3rd in the UK according to the UK University Rankings 2024 The Good University Guide published by The Times and Sunday Times.

Globally, the Institute was ranked between 351-380 globally in the QS University Subject Rankings for 2023. Also in 2023, Times Higher Education ranked the Institute in 301-400 globally.
