= John Miller Jr. =

American bassoonist

John Miller is a musician and bassoonist.

Miller received his early musical training at the Peabody Conservatory in Baltimore and the New England Conservatory in Boston. He also holds a BS degree in humanities and engineering from MIT and was awarded a Fulbright grant for music study in Amsterdam. While in Boston, he founded the Bubonic Bassoon Quartet and made the premier recording of the Hummel Bassoon Concerto, released along with the Weber Concerto on Cambridge Records.

Miller assumed the position of principal bassoon of the Minnesota Orchestra in 1971, when he also joined the music faculty of the University of Minnesota. Since then, he has continued his solo career, performing numerous times with the Minnesota Orchestra, as well as many other orchestras. He has also presented master classes and recitals at many of the world's major conservatories and music schools. In 2015, John Miller retired from his position with the Minnesota Orchestra after 44 years. As a farewell, the orchestra programmed a concerto for two bassoons, each movement performed with a different member of the bassoon section.

For more than 20 years, Miller was a member of the American Reed Trio. Among his solo recordings are four concertos by Vivaldi and the Mozart and Wanhal bassoon concertos, all conducted by Sir Neville Marriner on two Pro Arte discs. He was featured in the 1968 Cambridge Records release of Hummel's Bassoon Concerto in F. His teachers have included Louis Skinner, Arthur Weisberg, Stanley Petrulis, Sherman Walt, Stephen Maxym, and Thom de Klerk. One of Miller's educational activities, the Nordic Bassoon Symposium, begun in 1984 as the John Miller Bassoon Symposium, has attracted an international mix of hundreds of professional, student, and amateur bassoonists.
