= SS John Miller =

Liberty ship of WWII

History

United States
- Name: John Miller
- Namesake: John Miller
- Owner: War Shipping Administration (WSA)
- Operator: Isbrandstsen Steamship Co., Inc.
- Ordered: as type (EC2-S-C1) hull, MC hull 2515
- Awarded: 23 April 1943
- Builder: St. Johns River Shipbuilding Company, Jacksonville, Florida
- Cost: $999,281
- Yard number: 79
- Way number: 1
- Laid down: 7 December 1944
- Launched: 15 January 1945
- Sponsored by: Mrs. Margie Knight
- Completed: 24 January 1945
- Identification: Call sign: ANFH
- Fate: Laid up in the National Defense Reserve Fleet, Beaumont, Texas, 23 August 1949; Sold for scrapping, 3 December 1970, withdrawn from fleet, 17 February 1971

General characteristics
- Class & type: Liberty ship; type EC2-S-C1, standard
- Tonnage: 10,865 LT DWT; 7,176 GRT
- Displacement: 3,380 long tons (3,434 t) (light); 14,245 long tons (14,474 t) (max)
- Length: 441 feet 6 inches (135 m) oa; 416 feet (127 m) pp; 427 feet (130 m) lwl
- Beam: 57 feet (17 m)
- Draft: 27 ft 9.25 in (8.4646 m)
- Installed power: 2 × Oil fired 450 °F (232 °C) boilers, operating at 220 psi (1,500 kPa); 2,500 hp (1,900 kW)
- Propulsion: 1 × triple-expansion steam engine, (manufactured by General Machinery Corp., Hamilton, Ohio); 1 × screw propeller
- Speed: 11.5 knots (21.3 km/h; 13.2 mph)
- Capacity: 562,608 cubic feet (15,931 m^{3}) (grain); 499,573 cubic feet (14,146 m^{3}) (bale)
- Complement: 38–62 USMM; 21–40 USNAG
- Armament: Varied by ship; Bow-mounted 3-inch (76 mm)/50-caliber gun; Stern-mounted 4-inch (102 mm)/50-caliber gun; 2–8 × single 20-millimeter (0.79 in) Oerlikon anti-aircraft (AA) cannons and/or, 2–8 × 37-millimeter (1.46 in) M1 AA guns

SS John Miller was a Liberty ship built in the United States during World War II. She was named after John Miller, a Merchant seaman killed on the Liberty ship SS Samuel Heintzelman, 9 July 1943, when she was struck and sunk by a torpedo from German submarine U-511.

== Construction ==
John Miller was laid down on 7 December 1944, under a Maritime Commission (MARCOM) contract, MC hull 2515, by the St. Johns River Shipbuilding Company, Jacksonville, Florida; she was sponsored by Mrs. Margie Knight, the sister of the namesake, and she was launched on 15 January 1945.

== History ==
She was allocated to the Isbrandstsen Steamship Co., Inc., on 15 January 1945. On 23 August 1949, she was laid up in the National Defense Reserve Fleet, Beaumont, Texas. She was sold for scrapping, 3 December 1970, to Luria Bros. & Co., for $40,100. She was removed from the fleet, 17 February 1971.

== Bibliography ==
- "St. John's River Shipbuilding, Jacksonville FL". www.ShipbuildingHistory.com. 16 October 2010.
- Maritime Administration. "John Miller". Ship History Database Vessel Status Card. U.S. Department of Transportation, Maritime Administration.
- Davies, James (May 2004). "Specifications (As-Built)" (PDF). p. 23.
- "SS John Miller".
- "SS Samuel Heintzelman". www.Uboat.net.
