= Jordanhill College =

Architectural structure in Glasgow City, Scotland

Coordinates: 55.8845°N 4.3401°W

Jordanhill College of Education
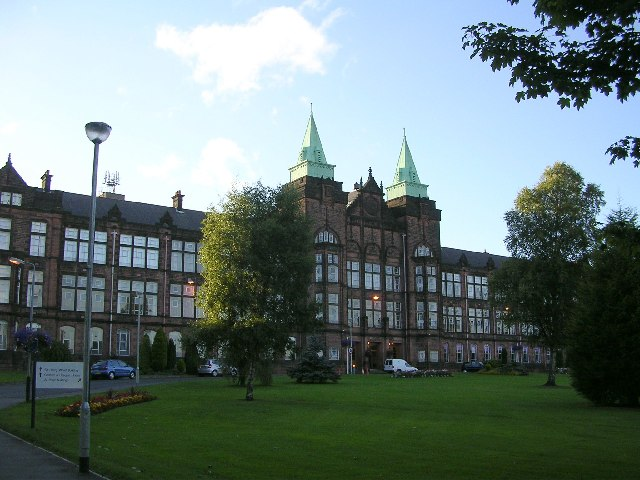
- Location: Scotland

Jordanhill College of Education was a higher education college in Jordanhill, Glasgow, Scotland. It opened as a teacher training college in 1921. The college merged with the University of Strathclyde in 1993, becoming its Faculty of Education. In 2012 all educational activities were moved to the John Anderson Campus and the campus closed.

== History ==
=== Jordanhill Teacher Training College: 1913–1993 ===
In 1913 Glasgow Corporation agreed a deal to buy the Jordanhill Estate from James Parker Smith, the former Liberal Unionist MP for Partick, and build both a teacher training college and the associated Jordanhill School on the site. After the outbreak of World War I, developments for the teacher training college were put on hold, as the former manor house was taken over as a temporary military hospital.

After the cessation of hostilities, a new building was planned to provide teacher training. With the new school completed in 1920 and the college in 1921, the now Grade B listed David Stow Building facilitated all teacher training provided under the unified University of Glasgow. Centrally funded and with no ties with churches, the college was largely non-residential (two small hostels were built, one in 1921 and the second in 1931); and its range of work was wider.

From 1921 to 1959 the regime at the college changed very little. The Scottish Education Department (SED) authorised only a two-year course for primary teachers, and a one-year post-graduate course for secondary teachers. In addition the college provided in-service courses for qualified teachers. The only important changes both took place in 1931 when the two-year primary course was extended to three years (and limited exclusively to women), and the Scottish School of Physical Education (SSPE) was created to train all the male PE teachers in Scotland.

In 1959, SED approved a Board of Governors and the right for each college to award their own qualifications. In part this was because of expected teacher shortages in the 1960s, with 1,927 students in 1959–1960, the number grew to 2,813 in 1963–1964, reaching a peak of 3,713 in 1975–1976, making Jordanhill at that time the largest teacher training institution in Britain. This expansion far outstripped the capacity of the original 1921 Stow building and college (former manor house) building, and hence an extensive building programme which included the 1961 demolition of the original manor house had to be undertaken, to provide new accommodation (inter alia) for the SSPE and the School of Further Education. Part of the increase in student numbers was due to diversification. In 1964, the college began courses to train students for the youth and community service; in 1967 it began courses for social workers; in 1968 the Glasgow School of Speech Therapy moved to Jordanhill and became the Department of Speech Therapy; and in 1970 all the training of teachers for further education colleges in Scotland was centralised in a School of Further Education. In addition, in-service training expanded rapidly in response to the curriculum reform movements of the 1960s.

The period of expansion came to an abrupt end in 1976, when SED realised that there was an over supply of teachers. The smaller Hamilton College was closed in line with UK national policy, with most of its staff absorbed into Jordanhill. The 1980s brought about the degree level four year degree qualifications, and latterly accreditation under the Council for National Academic Awards (CNAA), with all students hence following degree or post-graduate diploma courses which were externally validated.

=== Faculty of Education, University of Strathclyde: 1993–2012 ===
Anticipating the end of its independence, in 1991 the college approached the University of Glasgow with a proposal that it should become its Faculty of Education. In 1993, SED escalated the need for a merger with publication of its policy document on funding via the new Higher Education Funding Council. The University of Strathclyde approached the college, and an agreement between both institutions was reached. In 1993 Jordanhill College became the University of Strathclyde Faculty of Education.

With better use of facilities, and an ageing campus at Jordanhill which was highly protected by preservation orders, in 2010 the decision was made to close Jordanhill campus and move all courses to its John Anderson Campus. The academic year 2011-2012 was the last before this move took place.

The archives of Jordanhill College are maintained by the Archives of the University of Strathclyde.

== Notable alumni ==
- Craig Brown, football player and manager including Scotland national team
- Tormod Caimbeul (1942–2015), Scottish Gaelic writer.
- Ray Fisher (1940–2011), Scottish folk singer
- Mairi Hedderwick, author and illustrator, creator of Katie Morag.
- Janet Kitz, Scottish-Canadian historian and educator
- Jackie Knight, cricketer and football player
- Ian McLauchlan, 43 caps for Scotland in rugby union.
- Gwyn Singleton (1933–2021), dyslexia education pioneer
- Gordon Smith, cricketer

== Redevelopment ==
Working with Glasgow City Council and Historic Scotland to prepare a plan for the future of the former campus, in March 2015 the university announced a plan to sell the residual 30.9-acre (12.5-hectare) estate via land agents JLL. The "minded-to-grant" planning permission in principle plans propose that:

- Three-storey David Stow building could be converted for up to 71 residential apartments
- Graham House and Douglas House could house up to 23 apartments each

The remaining 1960s buildings on the site are recommended for demolition, and then divided into 12 plots could be used to develop up to 364 further residential units.

== See also ==
- Jordanhill RFC – the rugby club formed by the merger of Jordanhill College School FP RFC and Jordanhill College RFC in 1963.
- Hillhead Jordanhill RFC – the rugby club formed by the merger of Jordanhill RFC with Hillhead High School FP RFC in 1988.

== Sources ==
- Marker W.B. (1994) The spider's web? : policy-making in teacher education in Scotland, 1959-81. University of Strathclyde Publications Unit.
- Harrison M M and Marker W B eds. (1996) Teaching the Teachers : The History of Jordanhill College of Education. John Donald,. Edinburgh.
