= John M. Miller III =

American naval aviator and aircraft builder

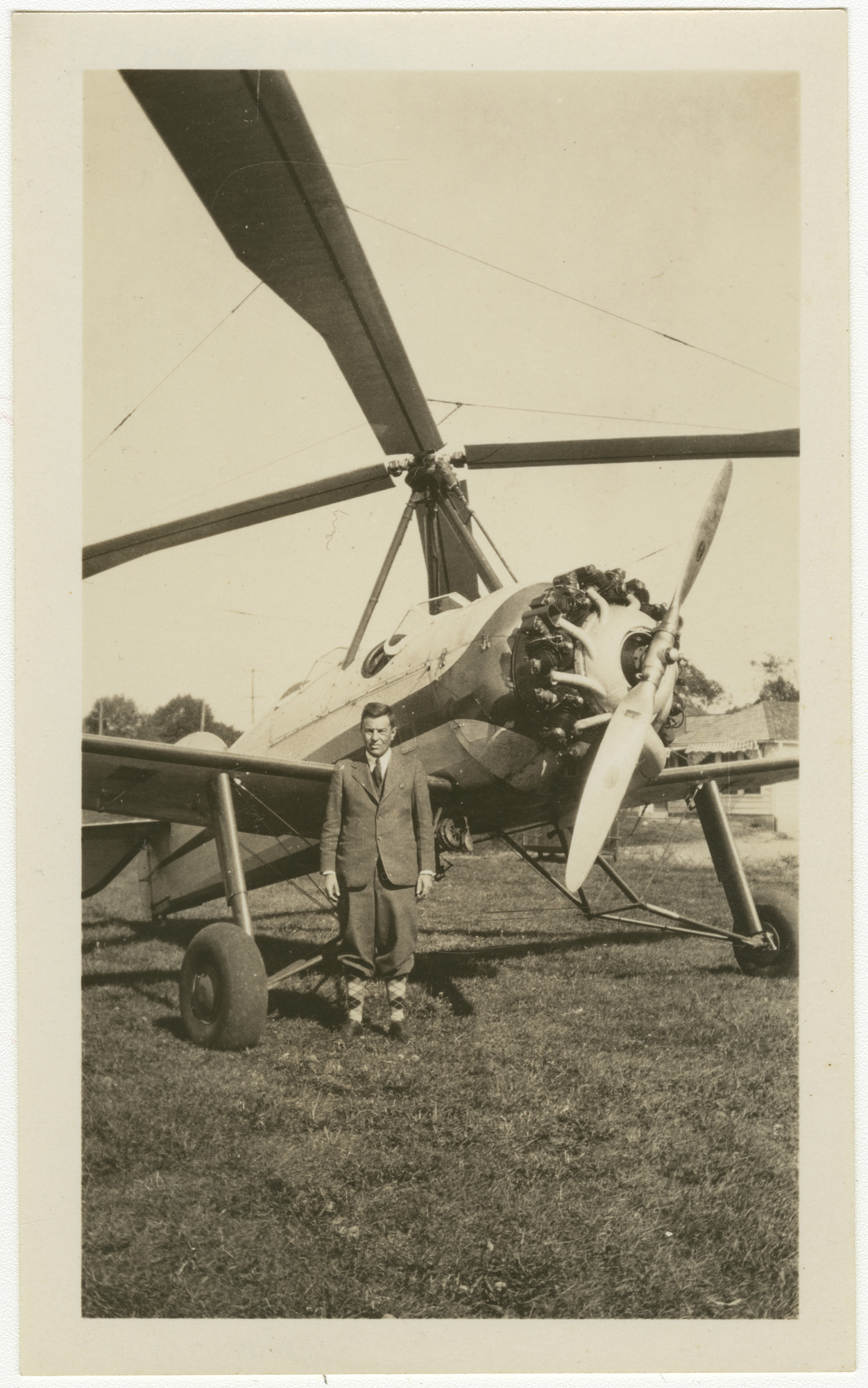
- John Matthew Miller III posed standing in front of Pitcairn PCA-2 Autogiro
- Born: John Matthew Miller III; June 3, 1896; Tacoma, Washington, US
- Died: circa 1980's
- Known for: Naval aviator and aircraft manufacturer

John Matthew Miller III (1896 – c. 1980's) was an American naval aviator, air mail pilot, transport pilot, autogiro pilot, flight instructor, aircraft manufacturer, airport operator, agricultural pilot, and helicopter test pilot. He worked for the United States Navy, the US Aerial Mail Service, Pitcairn Aircraft Company, and the U.S. Department of Agriculture. In 1927 Miller founded the Miller Aviation Corporation of New Brunswick, New Jersey which operated until 1929.

== Life ==
Born John Matthew Miller III on 3 June 1896 in Tacoma, Washington. He studied at the Massachusetts Institute of Technology (MIT) working summers at the aircraft manufacturer the Burgess Company in Marblehead, Massachusetts. As World War I raged, in 1917, Miller joined the Naval Aviation detachment at MIT. He started US Navy flight instruction at Hampton Roads, Virginia graduating to advanced flight instruction at Pensacola, Florida. On 16 March 1918, Miller commissioned as an Ensign and United States Naval Aviator. He patrolled near New York harbor while stationed at Naval Air Station Rockaway Beach, New York. After the armistice he was assigned inactive duty on December 15, 1918.

During his two-year US Aerial Mail Service, Miller trained in the Wright DH-4 at Belmont Park, Long Island. Hired as the station manager at Bustleton, Pennsylvania he flew the first non-stop mail route between Cleveland and Chicago on 22 May 1919. In 1920, he worked for America Trans Oceanic Company of Miami, Florida. Miller flew survey flights in Quebec, Canada in 1922. He managed operations for Pitcairn Aeronautical Corporation at Hadley Field in South Plainfield, New Jersey.

== Miller Aviation Corporation ==
On August 2, 1927, Miller founded the Miller Aviation Corporation at New Brunswick Airport (a.k.a. "Miller Field"), a short-lived airfield located southwest of the city. His company offered flying instruction, local sightseeing flights, and charter passenger flights in the mid-Atlantic seaboard region. In 1928 the Fowler flap inventor Harlan D. Fowler worked as Miller's chief aeronautical engineer. Later that year Robert W. Johnson of the Miller Aviation Corporation designed and constructed the Miller MCA-1 twin engine amphibian biplane. After successful water landings, the MCA-1 was damaged beyond repair, flipping over on its back, during the first ground landing, Miller was uninjured. Shortly after the accident his company dissolved and Miller returned to Pitcairn flying the PCA-2 autogiro. He was then hired to fly for the United states Department of Agriculture until World War II. During the war, Miller joined the United States Navy as a lieutenant commander, flying as a helicopter test pilot at Naval Air Station Patuxent River, Maryland. He returned to the Department of Agriculture until his retirement in 1956.

Miller flew the Wright DH-4; the Curtis Seagull for The Chicago Tribune; Pitcairn PA-3 Orowing; his Miller Corporation MCA-1 Amphibian Biplane; and the autogiro Pitcairn PCA-2. Documents of Miller's life from the 1914 to 1939 reside in the National Air and Space Museum Archives.
