= John Miller (author) =

American novelist

John "Jack" Miller
- Born: John Miller; Newberry, Michigan, U.S.
- Occupation: Novelist
- Writing career
- Period: 2003–present
- Genres: Espionage, Crime
- Website: retafsa.com

John "Jack" Miller is an American novelist originally from Newberry, Michigan.

== Career ==
=== Military career ===
Miller retired from the Air Force as a Senior Master Sergeant. He was awarded the US Army and Air Force Good Conduct Medal and several Air Force Commendation Medal and Air Force Meritorious Service Awards. He served as an Air Force Office of Special Investigations special agent.

=== Law enforcement career ===
After leaving the Air Force, Miller began his second career with the Clark County District Attorney's Office as a special investigator, working with undercover teams from the local Police and the FBI conducting burglary stings. He then joined the Nevada Gaming Control Board as an enforcement agent.

He was also certified as an expert witness in state and federal courts for gambling cheat trials.

=== Writing career ===
As of 2009, John Miller has written seven books.

- Cold War Warrior
- All Crooks Welcome
- Master Cheat!
- Cold War Defector
- Operation Switch
- The Peacekeepers
- Sin City Indictment

In addition he has written several short stories and four screenplays, one for a movie and three for TV (one hour).
