= John Millar (footballer, born 1927) =

Scottish footballer

Personal information
- Date of birth: 31 December 1927
- Place of birth: Cardenden, Scotland
- Date of death: November 1991 (aged 63)
- Place of death: Lincoln, England
- Position: Inside forward

Youth career
- Queen of the South

Senior career*
Years	Team	Apps	(Gls)
1949–1952	Bradford City	44	(7)
1952–1953	Grimsby Town	5	(3)
Total		49	(10)
- * Club domestic league appearances and goals

John W. Millar (31 December 1927 – November 1991) was a Scottish professional footballer who played as an inside forward for Queen of the South, Bradford City and Grimsby Town.
