= John Miller (Queen's Park footballer) =

Scottish goalkeeper (fl. 1960)

Personal information
- Full name: John W Miller
- Place of birth: Scotland
- Position: Goalkeeper

Senior career*
| Years | Team | Apps | (Gls) |
- Pollok
| 1960–1961 | Queen's Park | 17 | (0) |

International career
| 1961 | Scotland Amateurs | 3 | (0) |
- * Club domestic league appearances and goals

John W. Miller was a Scottish amateur footballer who played as a goalkeeper in the Scottish League for Queen's Park. He was capped by Scotland at amateur level.
