= J. R. Tucker =

American physicist (1946–2014)

John R. Tucker
- Born: 1946
- Died: April 12, 2014 (aged 67–68); Champaign, Illinois, U.S.
- Education: California Institute of Technology(B.S.); Harvard University(Ph.D)
- Known for: Tucker theory Instruments for Submillimeter astronomy
- Awards: IEEE Microwave Pioneer Award (2002)
- Scientific career
- Fields: Physics; Electronics
- Workplaces: Brown University; Technical University of Delft; Harvard University; Jet Propulsion Laboratory; University of Illinois at Urbana–Champaign
- Thesis: The Resistive Transition in One-Dimensional Superconductors
- Doctoral advisor: Bertrand Halperin

John R. Tucker (1946 – April 12, 2014) was an American physicist who made several contributions to the fields of electronics, physics and microwave theory, known for generalizing the microwave mixer theory and presenting the body of work, known as the "Tucker theory", and for his fundamental theoretical contributions which resulted into various advancements in experimental Submillimeter astronomy. He is also credited with laying down some of the technological foundations (a number of novel semiconductor devices and fabrication techniques) for making practical Quantum computing possible.

== Biography ==
Tucker was born in 1946 in Seattle, Washington, and proceeded to the California Institute of Technology where he completed his bachelor's in 1966 and came across Richard P. Feynman. He was one of the fortunate students to attend Feynman's lectures, which later resulted into the formal book widely known as The Feynman Lectures on Physics. He completed his doctorate in physics in June 1972 from the Harvard University, under the able guidance of Bertrand Halperin. His thesis title was "The Resistive Transition in One-Dimensional Superconductors". While completing his doctorate at Harvard, he also worked as one of the resident visitors and consultants in the theoretical physics group at the Bell Laboratories. One completion of his PhD, he was appointed as a postdoctoral research fellow at the Brown University with his advisor the well-known statistical physicist Leo Kadanoff. Tucker did much of his work on the photon-assisted tunneling (Superconducting tunnel junction) in SIS (Superconductor-Insulator-Suoerconductor) mixers (the "Tucker Quantum-Mixers Theory" or simply "Tucker theory"), his most glaring work, while working at Aerospace Corporation in California (from 1974 to 1981), before he joined the University of Illinois at Urbana–Champaign (UIUC) faculty in 1981, when recruited by the twice physics Nobel laureate John Bardeen in his research group. Both scientists remained colleagues and collaborators for a long time, which resulted into a number of physics studies. He served as an NRC Senior Fellow at the NASA Institute for Space Studies in New York (1980), Visiting professor at the Technical University of Delft (1999), member of the Review Panel of 'Laboratory Directed Research and Development Programs' at the Los Alamos National Laboratory (May 2001 and 2002), and as the Chair of the NASA/Caltech Jet Propulsion Laboratory MicroDevices Laboratory Visiting Committee from 2008. Tucker worked until his last days as a Professor Emeritus of Physics at the Department of Electrical and Computer Engineering at UIUC. He died at his residence in Champaign, IL, on 12 April 2014, leaving his wife, Mary Greiner, a son and a daughter.

Bardeen gives several accounts of Tucker and his work.

== Noteworthy scientific contributions ==
Fascinated by the possibility of using quantum phenomena in amplification of weak microwave signals, Tucker developed the quantum generalization of microwave mixer theory based on the quantum mechanical effect of photon-assisted tunneling (Superconducting tunnel junctions), which finally got to be known as the "Tucker Theory" (1975–85). The effects as predicted by this theory permitted noiseless amplification of incoming signals. This was an important discovery and it resulted into revolutionary advancements in the millimeter and submillimeter astronomy through the development of "Superconductor-Insulator-Superconductor (SIS)" receivers operating at around the fundamental limit for sensitivity (As restricted by the Heisenberg Uncertainty principle). These receivers found their way on all major (sub) millimeter telescopes at high altitudes.

James J. Coleman, a colleague of Tucker at UIUC said "He revolutionized space science. His predictions allowed others to build the hardware that helped dramatically change our understanding of the universe.”

Other than his theoretical pursuits, Tucker initiated atom-scale STM e-beam Lithography (as based on selective desorption of hydrogen from H-passivated silicon surfaces in ultra-high vacuum, with Dr. T.-C. Shen (1992–98)), as well as suggested techniques like gate-induced tunneling (field emission) as a new way for fabricating Metal Silicide Source/Drain MOS transistors.

In parallel to his groundbreaking work on tunneling junctions and the Tucker theory, he demonstrated an avid interest in the theoretical and practical development of quantum computers. Working towards his that vision, Tucker laid down the foundations of the Center for Quantum Computers at Illinois in 1981.

== Honors ==
As enumerated on the UIUC Dept. of Electrical and Computer Engineering website, Tucker was a recipient of following honors and awards and fellowships at various points of his career;

- IEEE Microwave Pioneer Award 2002 "for generalizing microwave mixer theory to include photon-assisted tunneling, and discovering new effects leading to quantum-noise-limited millimeter wave receivers."
- Fellow, American Physical Society 2002
- Visiting professor, Technical University of Delft, 1999.
- NRC Senior Fellow, NASA Institute for Space Studies, New York, 1980.
- Chairman, MicroDevices Laboratory Visiting Committee, Jet Propulsion Laboratory, NASA/Caltech, 2008-2009
- Review Panel, Laboratory Directed Research and Development Programs, Los Alamos National Laboratory, May 2001 and 2002.
- Tau Kappa Nu Faculty Initiate (for excellence in teaching), Fall 1995
- NSF Fellow, Harvard University - 1967 to 1971
- President, Caltech Chapter of Tau Beta Pi - 1965
