= John Miller (minister) =

John Dunlop Miller is a retired minister in the Church of Scotland. He was ordained and inducted to Castlemilk East Parish Church, Glasgow in 1971 - his only charge.

Known locally as - respectfully - Mr Miller, in 2004 the Reverend realised that many people in the local area were suffering with the loss of a loved-one due to accidents, violence and social problems; he therefore began The Lost Lives Project. http://www.localnewsglasgow.co.uk/tag/rev-john-miller/ The Lost Lives Project is aimed at channeling this loss and bringing together people of the community who, previously, suffered behind closed doors.

He retired from his parish duties in July 2007, but in retirement went to work temporarily for the Church in Zimbabwe.

His unassuming dedication to serving the people of Castlemilk was recognised by the Church of Scotland in his election as Moderator of the General Assembly in 2001. Miller Primary School in Castlemilk was named after him and his wife, Mary Miller.

The General Assembly over which he moderated was uniquely held in the Usher Hall in Edinburgh. This was to allow the Scottish Parliament to meet in the Church's Assembly Hall.

Religious titles
Preceded by Andrew McLellan	Moderator of the General Assembly of the Church of Scotland; 2001–2002	Succeeded by Finlay A. J. Macdonald
