= John William Miller =

American philosopher

John William Miller (1895–1978) was an American philosopher in the idealist tradition. His work appears in six published volumes, including The Paradox of Cause (1978) and most recently The Task of Criticism (2006). His principal philosophical ambitions were 1) to reconcile the idealism of Josiah Royce and the pragmatism of William James and 2) to integrate philosophical thought and historical thought. As testimony to the integrative nature of his thinking, Miller referred to his philosophy as a "historical idealism” and a “naturalistic idealism.”

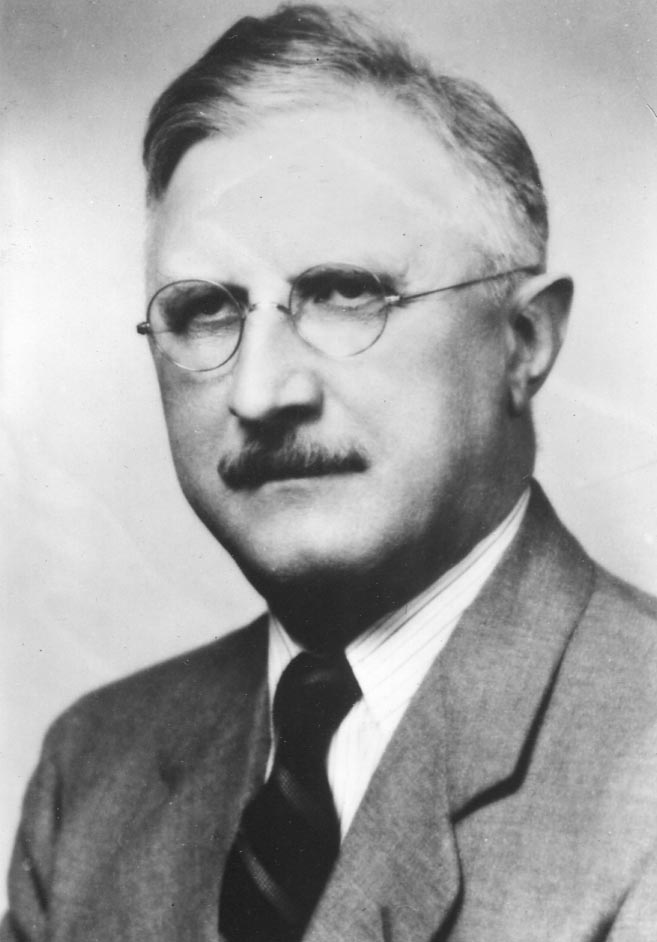
Portrait of John William Miller

== Early years and education ==
John William Miller was born on January 8, 1895, in Rochester, New York. He began his undergraduate education at Harvard University in 1912, transferred to the University of Rochester for his sophomore and junior years, and then returned to Cambridge, Massachusetts, for his senior year. Miller received his A. B. from Harvard in 1916. At the onset of American involvement in the First World War, Miller declared himself a conscientious objector and served as a volunteer in the ambulance corps in France with Base Hospital 44.

After the war, Miller returned to Harvard to begin graduate studies in philosophy. Among his teachers were philosophical realists such as Ralph Barton Perry and Edwin Bissell Holt as well as idealists such as William Ernest Hocking and Clarence Irving Lewis. It is still fair to say, however, that Miller’s strongest philosophical influences dated from the 19th century and were, most prominently, the German idealists Immanuel Kant, Johann Gottlieb Fichte, and Georg Wilhelm Friedrich Hegel. Ralph Waldo Emerson was also an important influence on the American side. In 1921 Miller received his master's degree and, under the direction of Hocking, went on to compose a work on the fundamental connection among epistemology, semiotics, and ontology. This work, titled "The Definition of the Thing," earned him the doctorate in 1922.

Miller's teaching career began in 1922 with an appointment at Connecticut College. During this time he married Katherine S. Gisel (1897–1993). In the fall of 1924 he took a position at Williams College in the Berkshire Mountains of northwest Massachusetts.

== Williams College years ==
Apart from two summer sessions and a one-year visiting appointment at the University of Minnesota in 1937–1938, Miller’s teaching career was spent at Williams College until his retirement in 1960. He served as chair of the philosophy department from 1931 to 1955 and influenced three generations of students. (Miller was often selected by graduating classes as the most influential professor at Williams and twice the college yearbook was dedicated to him.) From 1945 on he was Mark Hopkins Professor of Intellectual and Moral Philosophy, a title inherited from his colleague and predecessor as chair, the critical realist James Bissett Pratt.

During his early years at Williams, Miller and Katherine raised their two sons, Eugene (born 1925) and Paul (born 1928).

=== Pedagogy ===
At Williams, Miller taught courses across the whole philosophical curriculum—i.e., epistemology, metaphysics, aesthetics, semiotics, and political philosophy. Perhaps his greatest innovation in the classroom was the introduction of a course in the philosophy of history at a time when positivism was further separating philosophical reflection from historical thinking.

There was also no separating Miller’s historical idealism from his pedagogical philosophy. He was known to say, "I cannot understand a man unless I take him at his word." Classroom discussion, the civil exchange of ideas, and having a personal stake in each philosophical conversation were essential. For Miller philosophy was a mode of utterance wherein one actually speaks (i.e., expresses himself) and takes responsibility for what is said (i.e., reflects upon himself). Short of making both of these commitments—i.e., to expression and reflection—honest conversation is no more possible than is philosophy. The speech of the classroom serves to highlight the philosophical bases of conversation.

=== Influence on writing ===
It was as a teacher and not as a scholar that Miller was best known initially. Indeed, his reputation as a thinker spread via his teaching practice and the modest fame that came to him by means of the accounts of his former students. (See George Brockway’s essay on Miller, first published in the journal of Phi Beta Kappa society, The American Scholar, and later reprinted in Masters: Portraits of Great Teachers wherein Miller was grouped with educators of renown such as Hannah Arendt and Morris Raphael Cohen.) However, because he focused on his teaching and did most of his writing in the context of preparing lecturers and philosophical correspondence, Miller did not focus on formal scholarly publication.

In the 1930s he published two important articles in The Journal of Philosophy: "The Paradox of Cause" (1935) and "Accidents Will Happen" (1937). After these two publications, he presented four public papers: "Freedom as a Characteristic of Man in a Democratic Society" (American Political Science Association, Chicago, 1938), "History and Humanism" (Harvard Philosophy Club, 1948), "The Midworld" (Harvard Philosophy Club, 1952), and "The Scholar as Man of the World" (Phi Beta Kappa Society, Hobart College, 1952). This small number of essays and statements made available to public audiences belied the fact that in private Miller was a prodigious writer who was actively at work developing a coherent philosophical system organized around his central concept, the midworld. It would not be until his retirement that he would gather his writings and begin to make his historical idealism known to people other than his students and occasional auditors.

== Philosophy ==
Upon his retirement in 1960, Miller remained in Williamstown and continued his practice of philosophical conversation. However, the years of his retirement found Miller faced with the strong encouragement of a handful of former students who urged him to publish the four public addresses just mentioned and some of the many essays that he had penned over the years. In 1961 Miller published "The Ahistoric and the Historic" as an Afterword to a volume of translated essays by José Ortega y Gasset, History as a System and Other Essays Toward a Philosophy of History. Finally, by the late 1970s, Miller gathered a collection of his essays, which were published just before his death under the title The Paradox of Cause and Other Essays.

The philosophy that one finds in The Paradox of Cause and such posthumous works as The Philosophy of History (1981), The Midworld of Symbols and Functioning Objects (1982), and In Defense of the Psychological (1983) is a hybrid. Miller consciously sought a middle route through the oppositions of realism and idealism as well as pragmatism and idealism. It is a synthesis and revision of those contesting positions. For Miller philosophy was not the means of removing strife but, rather, the recognition and thoughtful organization of conflict. "To philosophize," Miller wrote, "is to be in thoughtful control of a problem." One important way of describing his thinking, then, is to say that Miller's philosophical synthesis does not effectively resolve the conflicts of his predecessors but shows the philosophical import of their disputes and the way in which their contests outline what must be ingredient in any worthwhile philosophy. His conception defines philosophy as the activity of criticism in the Kantian sense of that term—i.e., to be aware of the conditions of one's endeavors.

As stated above, Miller’s philosophy unites philosophical thinking and historical thinking. In doing so he fully integrated concepts of action and symbolism into his epistemology and metaphysics. The fruits of this approach are seen in his ethical and political philosophy.

=== Definition and action ===
In his dissertation and subsequent book The Definition of the Thing With Some Notes on Language (1980), Miller tied together epistemology and ontology via an examination of the process of definition. Here the possibility of “static definition” was attacked—i.e., a definition that has no connection to action and a defined thing that is fundamentally ahistorical. Unless definition is considered in this manner, Miller argued, we cannot make sense of 1) our own participation in the process and the establishment of meaning, and 2) the evolution and constant refinement of our understanding of things in the world. There is a dynamic relationship between the universal and particular, the terms of definition (predicates) and the thing defined.

The process of definition is founded on human action and meaning understood as "meaning for a human actor." At the bottom of definition is, Miller contended, an unending search for local control—i.e., an understanding of oneself and one’s world that was adequate to support a plan of action. Definition thus ties in with pragmatism. But Miller was careful to underscore that his appropriation of pragmatism was not a crude pragmatism of simple means–ends thinking. Rather Miller saw the fundamental practicality of universal ideas and fundamental concepts which provide general order to our world (e.g., mathematics, language) but which are, on their face, not useful in any immediate sense. Definition links together individual actors and universal concepts in an existential dialectic in which meaning is established and revised.

=== Midworld ===
The midworld was one of Miller’s central ideas and also one of his most difficult to understand. First it needs to be stated that the midworld of symbols and what Miller called ‘’functioning objects’’, is part of his answer to the problem of universals. What are these universals that are part of the process of definition? How do they arise? How do they relate to particulars? Miller’s response to these age-old questions was to say that universals are always embodied and they are always applied (and so made evident) in action. Just so, the idea of space is established in measuring devices like rulers. Instruments such as clocks determine the idea of time. The idea of justice is founded in judicial courts. Rulers, clocks, courts—these are all symbolic objects or practices. They are also functioning objects in the sense that a ruler is only different from another piece of wood in terms of what one does with it; they are symbolic objects that exist in use and in no other way.

As Miller made clear in The Midworld of Symbols and Functioning Objects, the midworld is not a world proper but rather the totality of all functioning objects (understanding object to have enough flexibility to include regularized practices and natural bodies such as the human organism). This open-ended collection of symbols is also not truly between anything. The midworld is not halfway between subjectivity and objectivity, the ideal and the real, or the natural and the artificial. It is more accurate to say that the functioning object is that thing which allows for one to disclose the subjective and the objective; it is not between these two worlds of experience but is in fact their condition of appearance. The symbols of the midworld are the vehicles by which we define ourselves, define our world, and engage in the ongoing process by which those definitions are revised in light of our discoveries about the world and our new demands for local control.

=== History ===
Definition is a historical process and the symbols of the midworld have historical careers. The need to generate, maintain, and revise meanings is one way of understanding history. It is on such terms that one sees the unity of epistemology, ontology, and metaphysics that provides a deep context in which we can grasp what Miller writes regarding definition, action, and symbol.

Miller embraced history in all his works but it is in The Philosophy of History that he drew a close connection between historical thinking and philosophical thinking. He did this in contrast to an ancient tradition (beginning at least with Plato) which joins philosophy with the timeless. However, as Miller noted, if philosophy is ahistoric then all philosophy can produce are observations. Philosophy cannot be related to or relevant for action. Of course, for proponents of the contemplative life this was something that recommended the ahistoricism of philosophy. Miller not only questioned the fundamental premises of ahistoric philosophy by arguing that every observation or thought is an action and thus an engagement in history but he also cast doubt on the relevance of a philosophy that does not derive from and speak to our pressing concerns for personal order, meaning, and right action. Because Miller’s philosophy is fundamentally a philosophy of criticism, if we are to grasp the conditions of our endeavors (and thus have self-conscious and responsible lives) then our philosophy must be historical and go to the midworld as the historical career of those very conditions. Philosophy and history not only must come together but also, considered in the appropriate light, are the same.

=== Ethics and politics ===
A critical philosophy becomes a political philosophy by virtue of our involvement in a community. Historical and philosophical thought can be individual and the sort of responsibility about which Miller wrote is in an important sense a responsibility of an individual to and for herself. However, the concept of the individual begs its pair in society and political institutions, and so critical ethics must become critical politics. It is in this fashion that Miller’s historical idealism can be understood as a metaphysics of democracy (a term he borrowed from Walt Whitman’s Democratic Vistas).

The ideal community provides people with the chance to act, the chance to be effective and become historical actors who maintain or revise the conditions of their endeavors. As one can see in The Task of Criticism, in order for that to be so we need to support something not unlike Karl Popper’s idea of an open society. Here Miller revisited the traditional connection between liberal democratic politics and the scientific community in which free and respectful speech is licensed, formal modes of criticism are supported, and orderly change and development is a key goal. In order to affect that, in both politics and science, Miller maintained that, as noted above, a historical and symbolic conception of rationality has to be endorsed.

Ultimately, for Miller, there is a convergence of historical study and political action. Scholarship and citizenship are two sides of the same coin in that they are two facets of an active and responsible life—i.e., understanding and then engaging with conditions of one’s endeavors.

== Final years ==
While retirement did eventuate in the publication of The Paradox of Cause, Miller passed his latter years quietly, conducting philosophy in the form of conversation and correspondence much as he had during his teaching career. Miller continued to write and clarify his philosophical position right up until his death on December 25, 1978. He was buried in the Westlawn Cemetery just west of the Williams College campus.

== Bibliography ==
=== Essays ===
- "The Paradox of Cause." The Journal of Philosophy 32 (1935): 169–175.
- "Accidents will Happen." The Journal of Philosophy 34 (1937): 121–131.
- "Motives for Existentialism." Comment (Williamstown, MA) 1 (Spring 1948): 3–5.
- Review of Walter A. Kaufmann's Nietzsche: Philosopher, Psychologist, Antichrist. Williams Alumni Review 43 (1951): 149–150.
- "Afterword: The Ahistoric and the Historic." In José Ortega y Gasset's History as a System and Other Essays: Toward a Philosophy of History, 237–269. Trans. Helene Weyl. New York: W. W. Norton, 1961.
- "History and Case History." The American Scholar 49 (1980): 241–243.
- "For Idealism." Journal of Speculative Philosophy 1 (1987): 260–269.
- "The Owl." Transactions of the Charles S. Peirce Society 24 (1988): 399–407.
- "On Choosing Right and Wrong." Idealistic Studies 21 (1992): 74–78.

=== Books ===
- The Paradox of Cause and Other Essays. New York & London: W. W. Norton, 1978.
- The Definition of the Thing with Some Notes on Language. New York & London: W. W. Norton, 1980.
- The Philosophy of History with Reflections and Aphorisms. New York & London: W. W. Norton, 1981.
- The Midworld of Symbols and Functioning Objects. New York & London: W. W. Norton, 1982.
- In Defense of the Psychological. New York & London: W. W. Norton, 1983.
- The Task of Criticism: Essays on Philosophy, History, and Community. New York & London: W. W. Norton, 2005.

== See also ==
- American philosophy
- List of American philosophers
