= John Miller (hurler) =

Irish hurler

Personal information
- Native name: Seán Ó Muilleoir (Irish)
- Born: 1966 (age 59–60) Coolderry, County Offaly, Ireland
- Occupation: Salesman

Sport
- Sport: Hurling
- Position: Left corner-back
Club
- Years: Club
- Coolderry
Club titles
- Offaly titles: 1
Inter-county
Years	County	Apps (scores)
1986-1995	Offaly	4 (0-00)
Inter-county titles
- Leinster titles: 5
- All-Irelands: 1
- NHL: 0
- All Stars: 0

John Miller (born 1966) is an Irish former hurler. At club level he played with Coolderry and at inter-county level with the Offaly senior hurling team.

== Career ==
After progressing through the juvenile and underage ranks with the Coolderry club, Miller eventually progressed to adult level. He was at corner-back when Coolderry beat St Rynagh's by 3–08 to 1–10 to claim the Offaly SHC title in 1986.

At inter-county level, Miller first played for Offaly during an unsuccessful stint with the minor team between 1982 and 1984. He later spent three years with the under-21 team and was at corner-back Offaly were beaten by Wexford in the 1986 Leinster U21 final.

Miller made his senior team in a National Hurling League game against Kilkenny in October 1986. He quickly became a regular member of the team and won three successive Leinster SHC medals between 1988 and 1990. Injury sidelined him for a period of time, however, he won further Leinster SHC medals in 1994 and 1995. Miller was an unused substitute when Offaly beat Limerick by 3–16 to 2–13 in the 1994 All-Ireland final.

== Personal life ==
His son, Ben Miller, won an All-Ireland U20HC medal with Offaly in 2024.

== Honours ==
Coolderry

- Offaly Senior Hurling Championship: 1986

Offaly

- All-Ireland Senior Hurling Championship: 1994
- Leinster Senior Hurling Championship: 1988, 1989, 1990, 1994, 1995
