= John P. Miller (educator) =

Canadian educator

John Miller
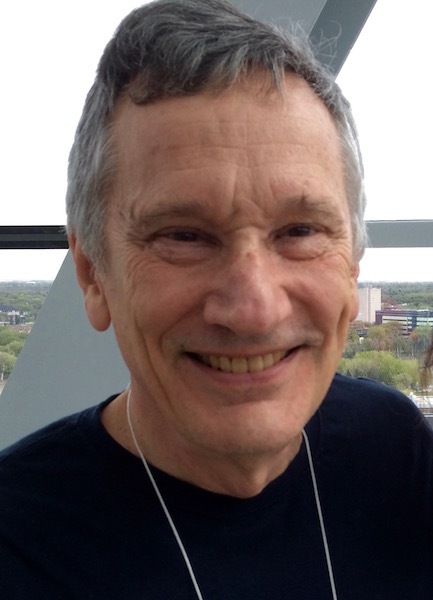
- Occupations: Holistic educator, author and academic

Academic background
- Education: B.A., Economics; MAT, Education; Ph.D., Curriculum
- Alma mater: University of Missouri; Harvard University; University of Toronto

John Miller is a Canadian educator, Professor of Curriculum, Teaching and Learning at Ontario Institute for Studies in Education (OISE) at University of Toronto.

Miller's work is focused on holistic education, curriculum and spirituality. He is an author of over 20 books including, Whole Child Education, Education and Soul and Educating for Wisdom and Compassion, and a lead editor of the book, International Handbook of Holistic Education. Miller's work has been translated into eight languages.

In 2009, Miller was one of 24 educators invited to Bhutan for the orientation of Bhutan's educational system towards the goal of Gross National Happiness. His book The Holistic Curriculum has been used as a basis for curriculum framework for the Whole Child School in Toronto.

== Education ==
Miller completed his bachelor's degree in economics from University of Missouri in 1965 and his Master of Arts in Teaching (MAT) degree in education from Harvard University in 1967. He moved to Canada and completed his Doctoral studies in Curriculum from University of Toronto in 1971.

== Career ==
In 1965, Miller became a History teacher at New York a High School. During his Bachelors and Masters studies, he had brief stints as Resident Advisor at Grinnell College and as instructor in education at the University of Missouri at Kansas City. After moving to Canada, he was a Graduate Assistant of Curriculum at OISE during his Doctoral studies. At the institute, he was promoted to assistant professor in 1972 and to associate professor in 1978, and in 1986, Professor.

At OISE he was appointed as Head of Northwestern Centre from 1978 until 1983. From 1983 to 1986, he headed the Niagara Centre, and also served as the Division Head of Field Centers and Coordinator Off-Campus Programming. From 1996 to 2003, he was head of its Southern Centre and in 2007, head of its Centre for Teacher Development. He has taught as visiting faculty at Ritsumeikan University in Kyoto, Education University of Hong Kong, and Kobe Shinwa Women's University.

== Research and work ==
=== Holistic Education ===
His books, Whole Child Education, Teaching from the Thinking Heart: The Practice of Holistic Education and The Holistic Curriculum, represent his work on holistic education. Miller is also a co-editor of a book series with Information Age Publishing, Current Perspectives in Holistic Education.

In 1990, Miller published his curriculum series Holistic Learning: A Teacher's Guide to Integrated Studies which provided strategies for applying transformational approaches to the integration of human processes and themes in curriculum. It explained the key elements for improving the academic ability and performance of children as well as for using holistic learning to educate the whole child, highlighting concepts of balance, inclusion and connection. He conducted research on holistic curriculum and discussed its key instances as alternatives to national curriculum published in the Oxford Encyclopedia of Education In the mid-2010s, he conducted a qualitative study of Equinox Holistic Alternative School and interviewed various stakeholders of the school, finding that the school was successful in achieving its goal of whole child education.

In 2009, Miller was invited to Bhutan as one of the 24 educators for the orientation of Bhutan's educational system towards the goal of Gross National Happiness.

=== Contemplative Education ===
Miller also worked on contemplative education, which focuses on the use of meditation and mindfulness practice. This work is explained in his book, The Contemplative Practitioner: Meditation in Education and the Workplace. He pointed out dualism as the major problem in applying contemplative studies in universities, explaining a non-dualistic framework that allows for self-integration. He worked on introducing contemplative studies to a graduate school and described the students’ experiences with various forms of meditation. Miller researched on the impact of meditation practice on teachers and found that the teachers who were involved with meditation practice in their graduate program, continued practicing meditation even after the completion of the program. Miller authored an article about the teachers’ self-reflection of their practices in context of contemplative studies. He discussed the three levels of practice in terms of a nesting concept and discussed the reflect-in-action approach for teachers in comparison with a contemplative approach.

=== Spirituality in Education ===
Miller investigated how concepts such as spirit and soul could be nourished in educational settings. This work on spirituality in education is discussed in his books, Education and the Soul and Educating for Wisdom and Compassion: Creating Conditions for Timeless Learning. He discussed Bronson Alcott's devotion to improve children's spirituality and described his work as an educator, explaining the relevance and application of Alcott's ideas in the present field of spirituality in education.

=== Orientations to Curriculum ===
In his books, The Educational Spectrum: Orientations to Curriculum and Curriculum: Perspectives and Practice he outlines the concepts of Transmission, Transaction and Transformation as basic approaches to teaching and learning and their relationship to curriculum development implementation and evaluation.

== Bibliography ==
=== Selected books ===
- The Compassionate Teacher: How to Teach and Learn with Your Whole Self (1981) ISBN 978-0131544680
- The Holistic Curriculum (2019) ISBN 978-1487523176
- Transcendental Learning: The Educational Legacy of Alcott, Emerson, Fuller, Peabody and Thoreau (2012) ISBN 978-1617355844
- The Contemplative Practitioner: Meditation in Education and the Workplace, Second Edition (2013) ISBN 978-1442615533
- Teaching from the Thinking Heart: The Practice of Holistic Education (2014) ISBN 978-1623967239
- Love and Compassion: Exploring Their Role in Education (2018) ISBN 978-1487503314
- A Holistic Educator's Journey (2021) ISBN 978-1648026416
- Taoism, Teaching, and Learning: A Nature-Based Approach to Education (2022) ISBN 978-1487540951

=== Selected articles ===
- "Suicide and Adolescence" in Adolescence, 1975, pp. 11–24.
- "Contemplative Practices in Teacher Education", co-author Ayako Nozawa in Encounter: Education for Meaning and Social Justice (2005) Vol 18, No. 1, pp. 42–48.
- "Meditating Teachers: A Qualitative Study", co-author Ayako Nozawa in InService Education, 28:179-192, 2002
- "Teachers’ Perceptions of their Roles: Life in and beyond the Classroom" Co-author Susan Drake, in Curriculum and Teaching, 16:5-24, 2001
- "Mandated Curriculum Change in Ontario: Stories of the Change Experience" Coauthor Susan Drake et al., in Curriculum Perspectives, 20:1-13, 2000
