= John Miller (entomologist) =

American entomologist

John Martin Miller (August 31, 1882 – March 31, 1952) was an American entomologist who worked in the Bureau of Entomology in the U.S. Department of Agriculture from 1911 to 1936. He was in charge of the Forest Insect Laboratory at Berkeley from 1928 to 1942, and was known for his research on bark beetles in forests of the western United States. Born in Parlier, California, he graduated from Stanford University with a degree in zoology in 1908. He died March 31, 1952, in Mexico City, while working as Consulting Entomologist with the Mexican government through the United Nations Food and Agriculture Organization.

== Select works ==
- Miller, J. M. (1914). "Insect damage to the cones and seeds of Pacific Coast conifers". Bulletin of the U.S. Department of Agriculture (95).
- Miller, J. M. (1915). "Cone beetles: injury to sugar pine and western yellow pine". Bulletin of the U.S. Department of Agriculture (243).
- Miller, J. M. (1921). "Insect control policy of Sierra National Forest". The Timberman. 22 (6): 37–39.
- Miller, J. M.; Keen, F. P. (1960). Biology and Control of the Western Pine Beetle: A Summary of the First Fifty Years of Research. Miscellaneous Publication 800. U.S. Department of Agriculture.
