= John P. Miller (naval officer) =

American naval officer (1882–1945) and acting governor of Guam

John Paul Miller

Acting Naval Governor of Guam
- In office December 8, 1922 – December 14, 1922
- Preceded by: Adelbert Althouse
- Succeeded by: Adelbert Althouse

John Paul Miller (16 June 1882 Lancaster, Kentucky – 13 March 1945 Philadelphia) was a United States Navy officer who served as Acting Naval Governor of Guam from December 8 to December 14, 1922. A graduate of the United States Naval Academy, Miller served during World War I and later commanded the Navy recruiting service in Philadelphia.

== Higher education ==
Miller entered the United States Naval Academy in 1902 and graduated with the class of 1906. Shortly before his graduation, he was convicted by court-martial of hazing and sentenced to dismissal from the academy. President Theodore Roosevelt pardoned Miller in February 1906, agreeing with the Navy Department that dismissal was disproportionate to the offense. Roosevelt subsequently cited Miller's case in urging Congress to revise the law governing punishment for hazing at the academy.

== Naval career highlights ==
During his naval career, Miller served aboard the battleships USS Mississippi and USS North Dakota. During World War I, he commanded the USS Emeline and participated in several engagements off the French coast. He later served aboard the USS St. Louis and USS Columbia. In 1922 he was assigned to Guam as aide to the naval governor and briefly served as acting governor in December of that year.

In 1924, Miller returned to Philadelphia to take command of the United States Navy recruiting service there. In 1936, the Navy Department appointed him President of the General Court-Martial of the Fourth Naval District.

See Courts-martial of the United States § General court-martial

== Bibliography ==
=== References ===
- "Naval Era Governors of Guam, Aug. 30, 1899 – Dec. 10, 1941". Guampedia, University of Guam. August 10, 2010. Archived from the original on 11 July 2011.
- New York Times (The). LCCN sn78-4456, LCCN sn00-61556; ISSN 0362-4331, ISSN 1553-8095 (online); OCLC 1645522 (all editions).
1. "President Says Hazing Penalty Is Too Harsh – Wants Law Providing for Dismissal of Midshipmen Modified – Explains Pardon of Miller – Believes Court-Martial Unnecessary Except in Serious Cases—Admiral Sands Says Fighting Will Stop". Vol. 55, whole no. 17546 (Late City ed.). February 7, 1906. p. 2 (column 5, top). Retrieved September 3, 2026.
  1. NYTimes Archives → Blog.
  2. TimesMachine → Pdf (PDF); Permalink.
  3. Via Internet Archive (SIM Box ID & Canister no.: IA41661330-21). IA Collection: SIM Microfilm; Periodicals; Pub New York Times.
  4. Pdf (PDF) – via Fultonhistory.com.
2. "Comdr. John P. Miller – Retired Naval Officer – Fought in the First World War". Vol. 90, whole no. 31828 (Late City ed.). March 16, 1945. p. 15 (column 3, middle). Retrieved September 3, 2026.
  1. NYTimes Archives → Blog.
  2. TimesMachine → Pdf (PDF); Permalink.
- Philadelphia Inquirer (The). LCCN sn86-81050; ISSN 2640-8546; OCLC 12755963 (all editions).
1. "Navy Recruiting Service Under New Commander – John Paul Miller Returns to Duty at Philadelphia from Far-Off Guam". Vol. 190, no. 76 (Late City ed.). March 16, 1924. p. 4 (digital image 28, columns 5–8, top). Retrieved September 3, 2026.
  1. Via Newspapers.com.
