= John M. Miller (artist) =

American painter (born 1939)

- Born: 1939 (age 86–87); Lebanon, Pennsylvania, U.S.
- Education: San Diego State University (BFA); Claremont Graduate School (MFA)
- Occupation: Painter

John M. Miller (born 1939) is an American painter. Born in Lebanon, Pennsylvania, he received a BFA in 1967 from San Diego State University and his MFA from Claremont Graduate School in 1972. Art critic Christopher Knight writing in 1995, called Miller "among the most important abstract painters working today." He is a two-time recipient of a National Endowment for the Arts Fellowship in Painting (1987 and 1993), and his works are in the permanent collections of museums such as the J. Paul Getty Museum, Los Angeles County Museum of Art, Museum of Contemporary Art San Diego, San Francisco Museum of Modern Art and the Carnegie Museum of Art.
