= James Miller =

James Miller may refer to:

== Arts and entertainment ==
- James Andrew Miller, American investigative journalist and author of oral histories on ESPN and CAA
- James Miller (playwright) (1704–1744), English playwright, poet, librettist, and minister
- James Miller (filmmaker) (1968–2003), British filmmaker killed in the Gaza strip
- James Miller (novelist) (born 1976), British novelist and academic who wrote Lost Boys
- Ewan MacColl (James Henry Miller, 1915–1989), English singer-songwriter
- Cootie Stark (James Miller, 1927–2005), American Piedmont blues musician
- James Miller, reality TV show Survivor: Palau contestant in 2004–2005

== Military ==
- James Miller (VC 1857) (1820–1892), Scottish recipient of the Victoria Cross in 1857
- James Miller (Medal of Honor) (1836–1914), United States Civil War Medal of Honor recipient
- Sir James Percy Miller (1864–1906), British soldier and racehorse owner
- James Miller (VC 1916) (1890–1916), English recipient of the Victoria Cross in 1916
- James Blake Miller (born 1984), U.S. Iraq War veteran, known as "the Marlboro Man"
- James Miller (general) (1776–1851), United States Army general and 1st governor of Arkansas Territory

== Politics and government ==
- James Miller (Newark politician), mayor of Newark, New Jersey 1838–1840 and 1848–1851
- James F. Miller, mayor of New Orleans 1863–1864
- James Francis Miller (1830–1902), U.S. Representative from Texas
- James Andrews Miller (1839–1886), Canadian lawyer, judge and political figure in Manitoba
- James Hughes Miller (1843-1890), Illinois legislator
- James Monroe Miller (1852–1926), U.S. Representative from Kansas
- James Rogers Miller Jr. (1931–2014). United States federal judge
- James C. Miller III (born 1942), American politician and economist
- James N. Miller (born 1959), American official in the Department of Defense
- Sir James Miller (builder) (1905–1971), Lord Provost of Edinburgh and Lord Mayor of London
- James A. Miller (politician) (1883–1965), member of the California legislature

== Science ==
- James A. Miller (biochemist) (1915–2000), American biochemist
- James Miller (surgeon) (1812–1864), medical author
- James Grier Miller (1916–2002), American biologist and pioneer of systems science
- James Q. Miller (1926–2005), American neurologist and educator
- James Paul Miller, American physicist
- James Douglas Miller (1937–1995), Scottish neurosurgeon
- James Gegan Miller (born 1942), American physicist

== Sports ==
- James Joy Miller (1886–1965), American football player
- James Miller (1910s footballer), Scottish footballer active in the 1910s
- James Miller (1920s footballer), Scottish footballer active in the 1920s
- James Miller (footballer, born 1904) (1904–?), Scottish footballer active in the 1930s
- James Miller (pole vaulter) (born 1974), Australian pole vaulter
- James Miller (cricketer) (born 1976), English cricketer
- James Miller (basketball) (born 1979), American basketball player
- James Miller (golfer), Scottish amateur golfer
- James Miller (parachutist) (1963–2002), American parachutist, known for his appearances at sporting events
- Bub Miller (James Miller), American baseball player

== Other people ==
- James Weston Miller (1815–1888), American Presbyterian minister
- J. R. Miller (James Russell Miller, 1840–1912), Christian author and pastor
- James D. Miller (1830–1914), steamboat captain in the Pacific Northwest
- James Miller (architect) (1860–1947), Scottish architect
- James Rupert Miller (1869–1946), Canadian-born architect in San Francisco
- James Walter Miller (1890–1950), American citizen who was a spy for the Soviet Union
- James Ivan Miller (1898–1967), Canadian journalist and sportscaster
- James Miller (religious brother) (1944–1982), American Catholic teacher killed in Guatemala
- James E. Miller (1920–2010), American professor of English
- James Miller (academic) (born 1947), American professor of political science and pop culture
- James L. Miller Sr. (1897–1989), reporter for the Kansas City Star and Times
- James Miller, Australian serial killer who committed the Truro murders in 1976–1977

== See also ==
- Jim Miller (disambiguation)
- Jimmy Miller (disambiguation)
- James Millar (disambiguation)
- Jamie Miller (disambiguation)
- Jack Miller (disambiguation)
