= George Sims =

George Sims may refer to:

- George Frederick Sims (1923–1999), English bookseller and crime writer
- George Robert Sims (1847–1922), English journalist, writer and bon vivant
- George R. Sims (New Port Richey) (1876–1954), founder of New Port Richey
- George Sims (educator), British educator
- A. E. Sims (1896–1981), British composer, conductor and Royal Air Force officer, sometimes known as George
- George Carol Sims (1902–1966), American pulp fiction author and screenwriter who wrote as Paul Cain
- George Sims (American football) (born 1927), American football player

== See also ==
- George Gall Sim (1878–1930), British administrator in India
