= Jim Miller =

Jim Miller may refer to:

== Sports ==
=== Gridiron football ===
- Jim Miller (halfback) (1908–1965), American football player
- Jim Miller (American football coach) (1920–2006), American college football coach
- Jim Miller (end) (1932–2006), Canadian football player
- Jim Miller (offensive guard) (born 1949), American football player
- Jim Miller (punter) (born 1957), former NFL player
- Jim Miller (quarterback) (born 1971), former NFL player

=== Other sports ===
- Jim Miller (fighter) (born 1983), American mixed martial artist
- Jim Miller (infielder) (1880–1937), Major League Baseball infielder
- Jim Miller (pitcher) (born 1982), Major League Baseball pitcher
- Jim Miller (skier) (born 1947), American Olympic skier
- Jim Miller (Australian footballer, born 1919) (1919–2026), Australian rules footballer for Footscray
- Jim "Frosty" Miller (born 1944), Australian rules footballer for Carlton and Dandenong
- Jim Miller (curler), Scottish curler
- Jim Miller (athletic director), University of Richmond athletic director
- Jim Miller (rugby union) (born 1939), Australian rugby union player

== Other ==
- Jim Miller (film editor) (born 1955), American film editor
- Jim Miller (linguist) (1942–2019), professor of cognitive linguistics at the University of Auckland
- Jim Miller (physicist) (born 1942), professor of physics at Washington University in St. Louis
- Jim Miller (outlaw) (1866–1909), outlaw in the American West
- Jim Miller (musician) (born 1954), American jam band guitarist and singer
- Jim Wayne Miller (1936–1996), American poet and educator
- Jim Miller (animator), storyboard artist and supervisor for My Little Pony: Friendship Is Magic, as well as director for Johnny Test

== See also ==
- Jimmy Miller (disambiguation)
- James Miller (disambiguation)
