= 2022 Australian Superbike Championship =

Motorcycle racing competition

Bryan Staring riding a DesmoSport Ducati Panigale V4 R in March 2022.

The 2022 Australian Superbike Championship season (known for sponsorship reasons as the Alpinestars Australian Superbike Championship) was the 43rd Australian Superbike Championship season. Wayne Maxwell started the season as the reigning champion, after picking up his third title in 2021.

However, it was Mike Jones who would go on take the title, his third overall. This was the first time a Yamaha mounted rider had won the Australian Superbike Championship since Jamie Stauffer in 2007.

The final round of the season was notable for the presence of MotoGP star Jack Miller in his final ride aboard a Ducati, as well as Moto2 rider Marcel Schrötter and Moto3 rider Joel Kelso.

== Race calendar and results ==
Initially, an 8-round calendar was announced for 2022, however, a round at Symmons Plains Raceway in Tasmania was later cancelled.

Round 6 of the championship coincided with the final round of the 2022 Superbike World Championship.

2022 calendar
Round		Circuit	Date	Pole position	Fastest lap	Winning rider
1	R1	Phillip Island Grand Prix Circuit	25-27 February	(Australia) Wayne Maxwell	(Australia) Wayne Maxwell	(Australia) Bryan Staring
1	R2	Phillip Island Grand Prix Circuit	25-27 February	(Australia) Wayne Maxwell	(Australia) Wayne Maxwell	(Australia) Wayne Maxwell
2	R1	Queensland Raceway	18-20 March	(Australia) Mike Jones	(Australia) Bryan Staring	(Australia) Mike Jones
2	R2	Queensland Raceway	18-20 March	(Australia) Mike Jones	(Australia) Mike Jones	(Australia) Mike Jones
3	R1	Wakefield Park	22-24 April	(Australia) Mike Jones	(Australia) Wayne Maxwell	(Australia) Mike Jones
3	R2	Wakefield Park	22-24 April	(Australia) Mike Jones	(Australia) Wayne Maxwell	(Australia) Wayne Maxwell
4	R1	Hidden Valley Raceway	17-19 June	(Australia) Wayne Maxwell	(Australia) Josh Waters	(Australia) Mike Jones
4	R2	Hidden Valley Raceway	17-19 June	(Australia) Wayne Maxwell	(Australia) Wayne Maxwell	(Australia) Wayne Maxwell
4	R3	Hidden Valley Raceway	17-19 June	(Australia) Wayne Maxwell	(Australia) Cru Halliday	(Australia) Mike Jones
5	R1	Morgan Park Raceway	5-7 August	(Australia) Wayne Maxwell	(Australia) Wayne Maxwell	(Australia) Wayne Maxwell
5	R2	Morgan Park Raceway	5-7 August	(Australia) Wayne Maxwell	(Australia) Troy Herfoss	(Australia) Wayne Maxwell
6	R1	Phillip Island Grand Prix Circuit	18-20 November	(Australia) Josh Waters	(Australia) Bryan Staring	(Australia) Bryan Staring
6	R2	Phillip Island Grand Prix Circuit	18-20 November	(Australia) Josh Waters	(Australia) Wayne Maxwell	(Australia) Wayne Maxwell
6	R3	Phillip Island Grand Prix Circuit	18-20 November	(Australia) Josh Waters	(Australia) Josh Waters	(Australia) Josh Waters
7	R1	The Bend Motorsport Park	25-27 November	(Australia) Mike Jones	(Australia) Wayne Maxwell	(Australia) Troy Herfoss
7	R2	The Bend Motorsport Park	25-27 November	(Australia) Mike Jones	(Australia) Mike Jones	(Australia) Mike Jones

=== Circuit locations ===
2022 Australian Superbike Championship circuit locations

== Teams and riders ==
2022 Entry List
Team	Constructor	No.	Rider	Rounds
Boost Mobile Racing with K-Tech	Ducati	1	(Australia) Wayne Maxwell	All
Boost Mobile Racing with K-Tech	Ducati	21	(Australia) Josh Waters	6–7
	Yamaha	2	(Australia) Mark Chiodo	1–4
727 Moto Racing Team	Yamaha	3	(Australia) Jed Metcher	1–3, 5–7
727 Moto Racing Team	Yamaha	4	(Australia) Broc Pearson	1–3
727 Moto Racing Team	Yamaha	9	(Australia) Billy McConnell	6–7
Desmosport Ducati	Ducati	4	(Australia) Broc Pearson	5–7
Desmosport Ducati	Ducati	67	(Australia) Bryan Staring	All
Northstar Yamaha Addicted to Track	Yamaha	10	(United States) Travis Wyman	6–7
Northstar Yamaha Addicted to Track	Yamaha	28	(Australia) Aiden Wagner	1–2
Northstar Yamaha Addicted to Track	Yamaha	37	(Australia) Michael Edwards	All
Northstar Yamaha Addicted to Track	Yamaha	43	(New Zealand) Alastair Hoogenboezem	6
Kawasaki Connection	Kawasaki	12	(Australia) Matt Walters	1–3, 5–7
MotoGo Yamaha	Yamaha	13	(Australia) Anthony West	All
MotoGo Yamaha	Yamaha	16	(Australia) Luke Jhonston	1
Maxima Racing Oils BMW	BMW	14	(Australia) Glenn Allerton	All
Maxima Racing Oils BMW	BMW	21	(Australia) Josh Waters	1–4
Maxima Racing Oils BMW	BMW	33	(New Zealand) Sloan Frost	5–7
Thriller Motorsport	Honda	16	(Australia) Josh Hook	7
Thriller Motorsport	Yamaha	23	(Germany) Marcel Schrötter	7
Thriller Motorsport	Ducati	43	(Australia) Jack Miller	7
Penrite Honda Racing	Honda	17	(Australia) Troy Herfoss	All
Penrite Honda Racing	Honda	81	(Australia) Senna Agius	6–7
RPE Racing	Honda	22	(Australia) Corey Forde	1
William Adams CAT	Yamaha	25	(Australia) Daniel Falzon	1–4, 6–7
GTR MotoStars Team	Yamaha	27	(Australia) Max Stauffer	All
JC Motorsports	Yamaha	29	(Australia) Ted Collins	6
Six Ways From Sunday	Kawasaki	33	(Australia) Hamish McMurray	1, 3
Dynapumps VRT Signs	Yamaha	35	(Australia) Ben Stronach	4
Yamaha Racing Team	Yamaha	46	(Australia) Mike Jones	All
Yamaha Racing Team	Yamaha	65	(Australia) Cru Halliday	All
Cooper Racing	Honda	51	(Australia) Chandler Cooper	1–3, 7
DTA Contractors	Yamaha	52	(Australia) Paul Lally	4
BC Performance	Kawasaki	60	(Australia) Ben Burke	1, 6–7
DC8 Studio Evolution Legal	Ducati	60	(Australia) Benjamin Lowe	5
Unitech Racing	Yamaha	61	(Australia) Arthur Sissis	All
Western Motorcycles Sydney	Suzuki	62	(Australia) Brendan McIntyre	6–7
SA Pool and Spa Services	Yamaha	64	(Australia) Michael Kemp	7
Livson Racing Team	BMW	66	(Australia) Joel Kelso	7
Livson Racing Team	BMW	78	(Australia) Nathan Spiteri	4–7
Top North Auto Air	Kawasaki	69	(Australia) Luke MacDonald	4
The Construction Team	Kawasaki	72	(Australia) Paris Hardwick	6–7
Brad Signs	Suzuki	75	(Australia) Trent Binaisse	6
BMW Alliance Racing	BMW	83	(Australia) Lachlan Epis	1–5
North Coast V-Twins	Ducati	86	(Australia) Beau Beaton	1–2, 6–7
Toprider Australia	Yamaha	88	(Australia) John Burns	2

== Championship standings ==
=== Riders' championship ===
Scoring system

Points are awarded to the top twenty finishers. A rider has to finish the race to earn points.

Position	1st	2nd	3rd	4th	5th	6th	7th	8th	9th	10th	11th	12th	13th	14th	15th	16th	17th	18th	19th	20th
Points	25	20	18	17	16	15	14	13	12	11	10	9	8	7	6	5	4	3	2	1

In addition, pole position is awarded 1 point.

Pos	Rider	Bike	PHI		QUE		WAK		HDV			MPR		PHI			TBM		Pts
Pos	Rider	Bike	R1	R2	R1	R2	R1	R2	R1	R2	R3	R1	R2	R1	R2	R3	R1	R2	Pts
1	(Australia) Mike Jones	Yamaha	3	4	1^{1}	1	1^{1}	2	1	2	1	2	2	10	5	3	6^{1}	1	328
2	(Australia) Wayne Maxwell	Ducati	Ret^{1}	1	2	3	2	1	4^{1}	1	11	1^{1}	1	Ret	1	Ret	2	3	276
3	(Australia) Bryan Staring	Ducati	1	2	16	2	5	5	3	3	4	5	3	1	6	2	Ret	12	258
4	(Australia) Troy Herfoss	Honda	11	13	6	7	4	4	2	4	3	3	5	8	4	4	1	Ret	242
5	(Australia) Glenn Allerton	BMW	6	7	4	6	7	8	5	14	2	6	7	2	7	5	3	14	235
6	(Australia) Arthur Sissis	Yamaha	8	8	7	4	6	6	7	7	5	8	9	4	9	7	5	5	231
7	(Australia) Josh Waters	BMW	4	5	3	5	8	7	8	6	7								217
7	(Australia) Josh Waters	Ducati												3^{1}	2	1	4	Ret	217
8	(Australia) Cru Halliday	Yamaha	2	3	5	Ret	3	3	6	5	6	11	6	11	3	Ret	8	6	217
9	(Australia) Daniel Falzon	Yamaha	5	6	11	11	9	11	9	8	8			9	10	Ret	9	8	159
10	(Australia) Anthony West	Yamaha	10	11	8	8	10	9	11	9	9	Ret	8	12	Ret	Ret	7	7	154
11	(Australia) Broc Pearson	Yamaha	14	15	12	12	DNS	DNS											122
11	(Australia) Broc Pearson	Ducati										4	4	7	11	8	13	9	122
12	(Australia) Jed Metcher	Yamaha	12	10	Ret	Ret	11	12				9	10	5	12	6	12	11	121
13	(Australia) Max Stauffer	Yamaha	16	17	14	14	14	13	12	12	Ret	10	12	17	18	9	14	15	108
14	(Australia) Lachlan Epis	BMW	Ret	Ret	DSQ	Ret	12	10	10	10	Ret	7	11						66
15	(Australia) Michael Edwards	Yamaha	20	19	17	16	15	14	15	16	13	13	14	22	23	Ret	DNS	DNS	59
16	(Australia) Mark Chiodo	Yamaha	13	14	10	10	Ret	DNS	Ret	11	10								58
17	(Australia) Matt Walters	Kawasaki	9	9	Ret	Ret	13	Ret				Ret	DNS	23	15	11	20	Ret	49
18	(Australia) Senna Agius	Honda												6	8	Ret	Ret	2	48
19	(Australia) Aiden Wagner	Yamaha	7	12	9	9													47
20	(Australia) Beau Beaton	Ducati	15	16	13	13								14	17	DNS	17	17	46
21	(Australia) Ben Burke	Kawasaki	DNS	DNS										15	13	10	15	16	36
22	(Australia) Ben Stronach	Yamaha							13	13	12								25
23	(New Zealand) Sloan Frost	BMW										12	13	18	24	17	21	21	24
24	(Australia) Chandler Cooper	Honda	18	Ret	15	15	Ret	15									19	20	24
25	(Australia) Nathan Spiteri	BMW							16	17	Ret	14	15	DNS	DNS	DNS	22	23	22
26	(Australia) Joel Kelso	BMW															11	10	21
27	(United States) Travis Wyman	Yamaha												16	Ret	13	16	18	21
28	(Australia) Paul Lally	Yamaha							14	15	14								20
29	(Australia) Jack Miller	Ducati															Ret	4	17
30	(Australia) Billy McConnell	Yamaha												DNS	14	Ret	DNS	13	15
31	(Australia) Brendan McIntyre	Suzuki												20	20	14	18	19	14
32	(Australia) Ted Collins	Yamaha												13	16	Ret			13
33	(Germany) Marcel Schrötter	Yamaha															10	DSQ	11
34	(New Zealand) Alastair Hoogenboezem	Yamaha												Ret	19	12			11
35	(Australia) Benjamin Lowe	Ducati										15	16						11
36	(Australia) Luke MacDonald	Kawasaki							17	Ret	15								10
37	(Australia) Paris Hardwick	Kawasaki												19	21	16	Ret	22	7
38	(Australia) Luke Jhonston	Yamaha	17	18															7
39	(Australia) Trent Binaisse	Suzuki												21	22	15			6
40	(Australia) Corey Forde	Honda	19	20															3
	(Australia) Michael Kemp	Yamaha															23	24	0
	(Australia) Josh Hook	Honda															DNS	DNS	0
	(Australia) Hamish McMurray	Kawasaki	DNQ	DNQ			DNQ	DNQ											0
	(Australia) John Burns	Yamaha			DNQ	DNQ													0
Pos	Rider	Bike	PHI		QUE		WAK		HDV			MPR		PHI			TBM		Pts
