= Jack Miller =

Jack Miller may refer to:

== Racing ==
- Jack Miller (motorcyclist) (born 1995), Australian Grand Prix motorcycle racer
- Jack Miller (racing driver) (born 1961), American racing driver

== Sports figures ==
- Jack Miller III (born 2002), American football quarterback
- Jack Miller (alpine skier) (born 1965), American former alpine skier
- Jack Miller (high jumper) (1899–1957), Canadian Olympic athlete
- Jack Miller (runner) (born c. 1925), steeplechase runner also known as Jimmy Miller, 1948 All-American for the North Carolina Tar Heels track and field team
- Jack Miller (footballer) (1875–1949), English footballer, who played for Wolverhampton Wanderers and Stoke
- Jack Miller (ice hockey) (1925–2004), professional ice hockey player who played with the Chicago Blackhawks
- Jack Miller (rugby league, born 1906) (1906–1978), rugby league footballer for Great Britain, England, and Warrington
- Jack Miller (rugby league, born 1994), rugby league footballer for Huddersfield, Doncaster and Keighley
- Jack Miller (sportscaster), Canadian sportscaster and politician

== Others ==
- Jack Miller (pastor) (1928–1996), American pastor and author
- Jack Miller (Iowa politician) (1916–1994), Republican United States Senator from Iowa
- Jack Miller (Georgia politician), American politician from Georgia
- Jack Miller, American screenwriter of the indie thriller Rat Fink
- Jack Miller, a character in the 90s sitcom The Nanny, played by Spalding Gray
- Jack Miller, the defendant in the American Supreme Court case United States v. Miller
- USS Jack Miller, an American warship

== See also ==
- John Miller (disambiguation)
- James Miller (disambiguation)
