= Jimmy Miller (disambiguation) =

Jimmy Miller (1942–1994) was an American record producer and musician.

Jimmy Miller may also refer to:

- Jimmy Miller (footballer, born 1871) (1871–1907), Scottish footballer for Sunderland, Rangers and Scotland
- Jimmy Miller (footballer, born 1889) (1889–1957), English footballer
- Jimmy Miller (footballer, born 1953) (1953–2025), Scottish footballer
- Jimmy Miller (American football) (born c. 1959), American football coach
- Jimmy Miller (runner) (born 1912), American middle-distance runner, 1934 NCAA runner-up for the UCLA Bruins track and field team

== See also ==
- James Miller (disambiguation)
- Jim Miller (disambiguation)
- Jimmy Millar (disambiguation)
