= James Millar =

James Millar may refer to:

- James Millar (artist) (c. 1735–1805), English portrait painter
- James Millar (educationalist) (1893–1989), Scottish educationalist
- James Millar (physician) (1762–1827), Scottish physician and editor of the Encyclopædia Britannica
- James Millar (Australian actor) (born 1980), Australian actor, singer and writer
- James Duncan Millar (1871–1932), Scottish barrister and Liberal, later National Liberal, politician
- James R. Millar (1936–2008), American economist
- James Millar (loyalist) (born 1966), Northern Irish loyalist paramilitary
- James D. Millar (1869–1948), American teacher, bookkeeper, businessman and politician
- James Broom Millar, British Foreign Service personnel and media executive
- James Millar (judoka), competitor in the 2009 European Judo Championships
- James Millar (skier), Paralympian who represented Australia at the Winter Olympics in 2006 and 2010

== See also ==
- Jimmy Millar (disambiguation)
- James Miller (disambiguation)
