= Formula Xtreme =

Formula Xtreme may refer to:

- AMA Formula Xtreme, a defunct American professional motorcycle class
- Australian FX-Superbike Championship, an Australian professional motorcycle series formerly known as Formula Xtreme
