= Jamie Miller =

Jamie Miller may refer to:

- Jamie Miller (singer), British singer
- Jamie Miller (drummer), American rock drummer
- The main character from the British crime drama series Adolescence

== See also ==
- James Miller (disambiguation)
