= 2011 Imola Superbike World Championship round =

(Italy) 2011 Imola Superbike World Championship round
Round details
- Round 11 of 13 rounds in the 2011 Superbike World Championship. and Round 10 of 12 rounds in the 2011 Supersport World Championship.
- Date: September 25, 2011
- Location: Autodromo Enzo e Dino Ferrari
- Course: Permanent racing facility 4.936 km (3.067 mi)

Superbike World Championship
Pole position
(Spain) Carlos Checa
1:47.196
Fastest lap race 1	Fastest lap race 2
(Japan) Noriyuki Haga	(Spain) Carlos Checa
1:47.960	1:47.934

Supersport World Championship
Pole position
(Australia) Broc Parkes
1:51.594
Fastest lap
(France) Fabien Foret
1:52.059

The 2011 Imola Superbike World Championship round was the eleventh round of the 2011 Superbike World Championship. It took place on the weekend of September 23–25, 2011 at Autodromo Enzo e Dino Ferrari, Imola, Italy.

== Results ==
=== Superbike race 1 classification ===
Pos.	No.	Rider	Bike	Laps	Time/Retired	Grid	Points
1	4	(United Kingdom) Jonathan Rea	Honda CBR1000RR	21	38:03.396	2	25
2	41	(Japan) Noriyuki Haga	Aprilia RSV4 Factory	21	+0.111	3	20
3	7	(Spain) Carlos Checa	Ducati 1098R	21	+9.449	1	16
4	66	(United Kingdom) Tom Sykes	Kawasaki ZX-10R	21	+9.792	4	13
5	58	(Republic of Ireland) Eugene Laverty	Yamaha YZF-R1	21	+14.699	5	11
6	50	(France) Sylvain Guintoli	Ducati 1098R	21	+16.820	8	10
7	96	(Czech Republic) Jakub Smrž	Ducati 1098R	21	+24.227	13	9
8	33	(Italy) Marco Melandri	Yamaha YZF-R1	21	+24.935	9	8
9	86	(Italy) Ayrton Badovini	BMW S1000RR	21	+25.224	7	7
10	17	(Spain) Joan Lascorz	Kawasaki ZX-10R	21	+25.487	18	6
11	8	(Australia) Mark Aitchison	Kawasaki ZX-10R	21	+26.148	17	5
12	11	(Australia) Troy Corser	BMW S1000RR	21	+26.444	15	4
13	23	(Italy) Federico Sandi	Ducati 1098R	21	+29.761	14	3
14	53	(Italy) Alessandro Polita	Ducati 1098R	21	+30.083	16	2
15	2	(United Kingdom) Leon Camier	Aprilia RSV4 Factory	21	+34.862	10	1
16	15	(Italy) Matteo Baiocco	Ducati 1098R	21	+40.331	19	
17	111	(Spain) Rubén Xaus	Honda CBR1000RR	21	+44.547	20	
18	44	(Italy) Roberto Rolfo	Kawasaki ZX-10R	21	+50.241	21	
Ret	91	(United Kingdom) Leon Haslam	BMW S1000RR	8	Retirement	6	
Ret	112	(Spain) Javier Forés	BMW S1000RR	6	Retirement	22	
Ret	84	(Italy) Michel Fabrizio	Suzuki GSX-R1000	1	Accident	11	
Ret	121	(France) Maxime Berger	Ducati 1098R	1	Retirement	12	
OFFICIAL SUPERBIKE RACE 1 REPORT

=== Superbike race 2 classification ===
Pos.	No.	Rider	Bike	Laps	Time/Retired	Grid	Points
1	7	(Spain) Carlos Checa	Ducati 1098R	21	38:04.538	1	25
2	41	(Japan) Noriyuki Haga	Aprilia RSV4 Factory	21	+4.631	3	20
3	2	(United Kingdom) Leon Camier	Aprilia RSV4 Factory	21	+15.159	10	16
4	58	(Republic of Ireland) Eugene Laverty	Yamaha YZF-R1	21	+17.195	5	13
5	91	(United Kingdom) Leon Haslam	BMW S1000RR	21	+17.388	6	11
6	33	(Italy) Marco Melandri	Yamaha YZF-R1	21	+18.533	9	10
7	50	(France) Sylvain Guintoli	Ducati 1098R	21	+19.615	8	9
8	17	(Spain) Joan Lascorz	Kawasaki ZX-10R	21	+20.063	18	8
9	8	(Australia) Mark Aitchison	Kawasaki ZX-10R	21	+24.194	17	7
10	86	(Italy) Ayrton Badovini	BMW S1000RR	21	+28.485	7	6
11	111	(Spain) Rubén Xaus	Honda CBR1000RR	21	+28.600	20	5
12	23	(Italy) Federico Sandi	Ducati 1098R	21	+41.802	14	4
13	121	(France) Maxime Berger	Ducati 1098R	21	+54.750	12	3
14	112	(Spain) Javier Forés	BMW S1000RR	21	+1:12.281	22	2
Ret	53	(Italy) Alessandro Polita	Ducati 1098R	19	Technical problem	16	
Ret	4	(United Kingdom) Jonathan Rea	Honda CBR1000RR	17	Retirement	2	
Ret	84	(Italy) Michel Fabrizio	Suzuki GSX-R1000	10	Retirement	11	
Ret	15	(Italy) Matteo Baiocco	Ducati 1098R	9	Retirement	19	
Ret	11	(Australia) Troy Corser	BMW S1000RR	9	Retirement	15	
Ret	66	(United Kingdom) Tom Sykes	Kawasaki ZX-10R	7	Retirement	4	
Ret	44	(Italy) Roberto Rolfo	Kawasaki ZX-10R	2	Technical problem	21	
Ret	96	(Czech Republic) Jakub Smrž	Ducati 1098R	1	Accident	13	
OFFICIAL SUPERBIKE RACE 2 REPORT

=== Supersport race classification ===
Pos.	No.	Rider	Bike	Laps	Time/Retired	Grid	Points
1	99	(France) Fabien Foret	Honda CBR600RR	19	35:56.214	12	25
2	11	(United Kingdom) Sam Lowes	Honda CBR600RR	19	+0.166	8	20
3	23	(Australia) Broc Parkes	Kawasaki ZX-6R	19	+2.499	1	16
4	21	(France) Florian Marino	Honda CBR600RR	19	+3.833	3	13
5	44	(Spain) David Salom	Kawasaki ZX-6R	19	+6.325	5	11
6	77	(United Kingdom) James Ellison	Honda CBR600RR	19	+21.872	15	10
7	31	(Italy) Vittorio Iannuzzo	Kawasaki ZX-6R	19	+25.826	11	9
8	117	(Portugal) Miguel Praia	Honda CBR600RR	19	+27.553	19	8
9	12	(Italy) Stefano Cruciani	Kawasaki ZX-6R	19	+30.044	17	7
10	91	(Italy) Danilo Dell'Omo	Triumph Daytona 675	19	+31.140	18	6
11	4	(United Kingdom) Gino Rea	Honda CBR600RR	19	+32.212	9	5
12	28	(Poland) Paweł Szkopek	Honda CBR600RR	19	+32.845	20	4
13	17	(Czech Republic) Patrik Vostárek	Honda CBR600RR	19	+33.402	21	3
14	69	(Czech Republic) Ondřej Ježek	Honda CBR600RR	19	+42.637	16	2
15	10	(Hungary) Imre Tóth	Honda CBR600RR	19	+43.177	23	1
16	45	(Romania) Cătălin Cazacu	Honda CBR600RR	19	+1:49.642	26	
17	24	(Russia) Eduard Blokhin	Yamaha YZF-R6	18	+1 lap	28	
Ret	34	(South Africa) Ronan Quarmby	Triumph Daytona 675	17	Accident	10	
Ret	55	(Italy) Massimo Roccoli	Kawasaki ZX-6R	16	Retirement	7	
Ret	7	(United Kingdom) Chaz Davies	Yamaha YZF-R6	14	Technical problem	4	
Ret	5	(Sweden) Alexander Lundh	Honda CBR600RR	14	Retirement	13	
Ret	38	(Hungary) Balázs Németh	Honda CBR600RR	11	Technical problem	24	
Ret	9	(Italy) Luca Scassa	Yamaha YZF-R6	7	Technical problem	2	
Ret	19	(Australia) Mitchell Pirotta	Honda CBR600RR	6	Retirement	27	
Ret	22	(Italy) Roberto Tamburini	Yamaha YZF-R6	3	Technical problem	6	
Ret	8	(Switzerland) Bastien Chesaux	Honda CBR600RR	0	Accident	22	
Ret	25	(Slovenia) Marko Jerman	Triumph Daytona 675	0	Accident	25	
DNS	127	(Denmark) Robbin Harms	Honda CBR600RR	0	Did not start	14	
DNS	61	(Italy) Fabio Menghi	Yamaha YZF-R6		Did not start		
DNS	87	(Italy) Luca Marconi	Yamaha YZF-R6		Did not start		
DNS	33	(Austria) Yves Polzer	Yamaha YZF-R6		Did not start		
DNQ	73	(Russia) Oleg Pozdneev	Yamaha YZF-R6		Did not qualify		
OFFICIAL SUPERSPORT RACE REPORT

=== Superstock 1000 race classification ===
Pos.	No.	Rider	Bike	Laps	Time/Retired	Grid	Points
1	9	(Italy) Danilo Petrucci	Ducati 1098R	12	22:10.546	2	25
2	34	(Italy) Davide Giugliano	Ducati 1098R	12	+2.087	1	20
3	59	(Italy) Niccolò Canepa	Ducati 1098R	12	+3.339	6	16
4	14	(Italy) Lorenzo Baroni	Ducati 1098R	12	+14.422	4	13
5	20	(France) Sylvain Barrier	BMW S1000RR	12	+16.130	3	11
6	21	(Germany) Markus Reiterberger	BMW S1000RR	12	+20.645	8	10
7	32	(South Africa) Sheridan Morais	Kawasaki ZX-10R	12	+21.317	12	9
8	119	(Italy) Michele Magnoni	BMW S1000RR	12	+21.483	10	8
9	15	(Italy) Fabio Massei	BMW S1000RR	12	+22.724	14	7
10	6	(Italy) Lorenzo Savadori	Kawasaki ZX-10R	12	+23.530	13	6
11	8	(Italy) Andrea Antonelli	Honda CBR1000RR	12	+24.491	7	5
12	67	(Australia) Bryan Staring	Kawasaki ZX-10R	12	+29.121	17	4
13	5	(Italy) Marco Bussolotti	Kawasaki ZX-10R	12	+29.426	15	3
14	36	(Argentina) Leandro Mercado	Kawasaki ZX-10R	12	+37.618	16	2
15	28	(Italy) Ferruccio Lamborghini	Honda CBR1000RR	12	+42.892	11	1
16	11	(France) Jérémy Guarnoni	Yamaha YZF-R1	12	+43.174	19	
17	7	(Spain) Dani Rivas	Kawasaki ZX-10R	12	+43.252	23	
18	86	(Australia) Beau Beaton	BMW S1000RR	12	+43.856	18	
19	55	(Slovakia) Tomáš Svitok	Ducati 1098R	12	+54.815	21	
20	107	(Italy) Niccolò Rosso	Kawasaki ZX-10R	12	+59.686	25	
21	74	(Brazil) Danilo Andric Silva	BMW S1000RR	12	+1:01.420	24	
22	71	(Netherlands) Roy Ten Napel	Honda CBR1000RR	12	+1:02.061	26	
23	39	(France) Randy Pagaud	BMW S1000RR	12	+1:09.178	20	
24	58	(Switzerland) Gabriel Berclaz	Honda CBR1000RR	12	+1:12.064	27	
25	27	(Switzerland) Thomas Caiani	Kawasaki ZX-10R	12	+1:34.247	28	
26	40	(Hungary) Alen Győrfi	Honda CBR1000RR	11	+1 lap	22	
Ret	87	(Italy) Lorenzo Zanetti	BMW S1000RR	1	Accident	5	
Ret	47	(Italy) Eddi La Marra	Honda CBR1000RR	1	Accident	9	
DNQ	30	(Romania) Bogdan Vrăjitoru	Yamaha YZF-R1		Did not qualify		
DNQ	22	(Switzerland) Jonathan Crea	BMW S1000RR		Did not qualify		
OFFICIAL SUPERSTOCK 1000 RACE REPORT

=== Superstock 600 race classification ===
Pos.	No.	Rider	Bike	Laps	Time/Retired	Grid	Points
1	4	(United States) Joshua Day	Kawasaki ZX-6R	11	21:17.080	4	25
2	84	(Italy) Riccardo Russo	Yamaha YZF-R6	11	+0.813	6	20
3	3	(Australia) Jed Metcher	Yamaha YZF-R6	11	+1.226	1	16
4	53	(Italy) Nicola Jr. Morrentino	Yamaha YZF-R6	11	+1.589	2	13
5	60	(Netherlands) Michael Van Der Mark	Honda CBR600RR	11	+1.744	5	11
6	12	(Italy) Franco Morbidelli	Yamaha YZF-R6	11	+7.948	9	10
7	13	(Italy) Dino Lombardi	Yamaha YZF-R6	11	+8.491	8	9
8	415	(Italy) Federico Dittadi	Yamaha YZF-R6	11	+8.744	7	8
9	98	(France) Romain Lanusse	Yamaha YZF-R6	11	+9.248	10	7
10	29	(Italy) Daniele Beretta	Yamaha YZF-R6	11	+11.330	14	6
11	25	(Italy) Federico Monti	Yamaha YZF-R6	11	+21.989	22	5
12	19	(Slovakia) Tomáš Krajči	Yamaha YZF-R6	11	+22.167	12	4
13	99	(Netherlands) Tony Coveña	Yamaha YZF-R6	11	+22.179	16	3
14	825	(United States) Joey Pascarella	Honda CBR600RR	11	+25.447	17	2
15	18	(Italy) Christian Gamarino	Kawasaki ZX-6R	11	+27.010	21	1
16	59	(Denmark) Alex Schacht	Honda CBR600RR	11	+28.573	24	
17	74	(Switzerland) Robin Mulhauser	Yamaha YZF-R6	11	+28.676	19	
18	75	(Italy) Francesco Cocco	Yamaha YZF-R6	11	+30.695	3	
19	10	(Spain) Nacho Calero	Yamaha YZF-R6	11	+31.620	27	
20	37	(Italy) Stefano Mesa	Yamaha YZF-R6	11	+34.534	31	
21	16	(Poland) Artur Wielebski	Honda CBR600RR	11	+34.736	26	
22	70	(Italy) Luca Vitali	Yamaha YZF-R6	11	+37.554	18	
23	92	(Australia) Adrian Nestorovic	Yamaha YZF-R6	11	+37.929	25	
24	23	(Luxembourg) Christophe Ponsson	Yamaha YZF-R6	11	+40.735	28	
25	94	(Italy) Manuel D'Andrea	Yamaha YZF-R6	11	+44.358	29	
26	151	(Italy) Filippo Benini	Honda CBR600RR	11	+45.406	32	
27	11	(France) Anthony Dumont	Yamaha YZF-R6	11	+51.892	34	
28	90	(Italy) Rosario Paratore	Yamaha YZF-R6	11	+1:09.326 (Note: 20-second penalty for cutting chicane.)	30	
29	78	(Netherlands) Tristan Lentink	Honda CBR600RR	11	+1:36.742	33	
Ret	64	(Italy) Riccardo Cecchini	Triumph Daytona 675	8	Technical	11	
Ret	26	(Romania) Mircea Vrajitoru	Yamaha YZF-R6	7	Retirement	23	
Ret	33	(Italy) Giuliano Gregorini	Yamaha YZF-R6	5	Accident	13	
Ret	52	(Belgium) Gauthier Duwelz	Yamaha YZF-R6	4	Retirement	15	
Ret	43	(France) Stéphane Egea	Yamaha YZF-R6	1	Accident	20	
OFFICIAL SUPERSTOCK 600 RACE REPORT
