= Jack Miller (motorcyclist) =

Australian motorcycle racer (born 1995)

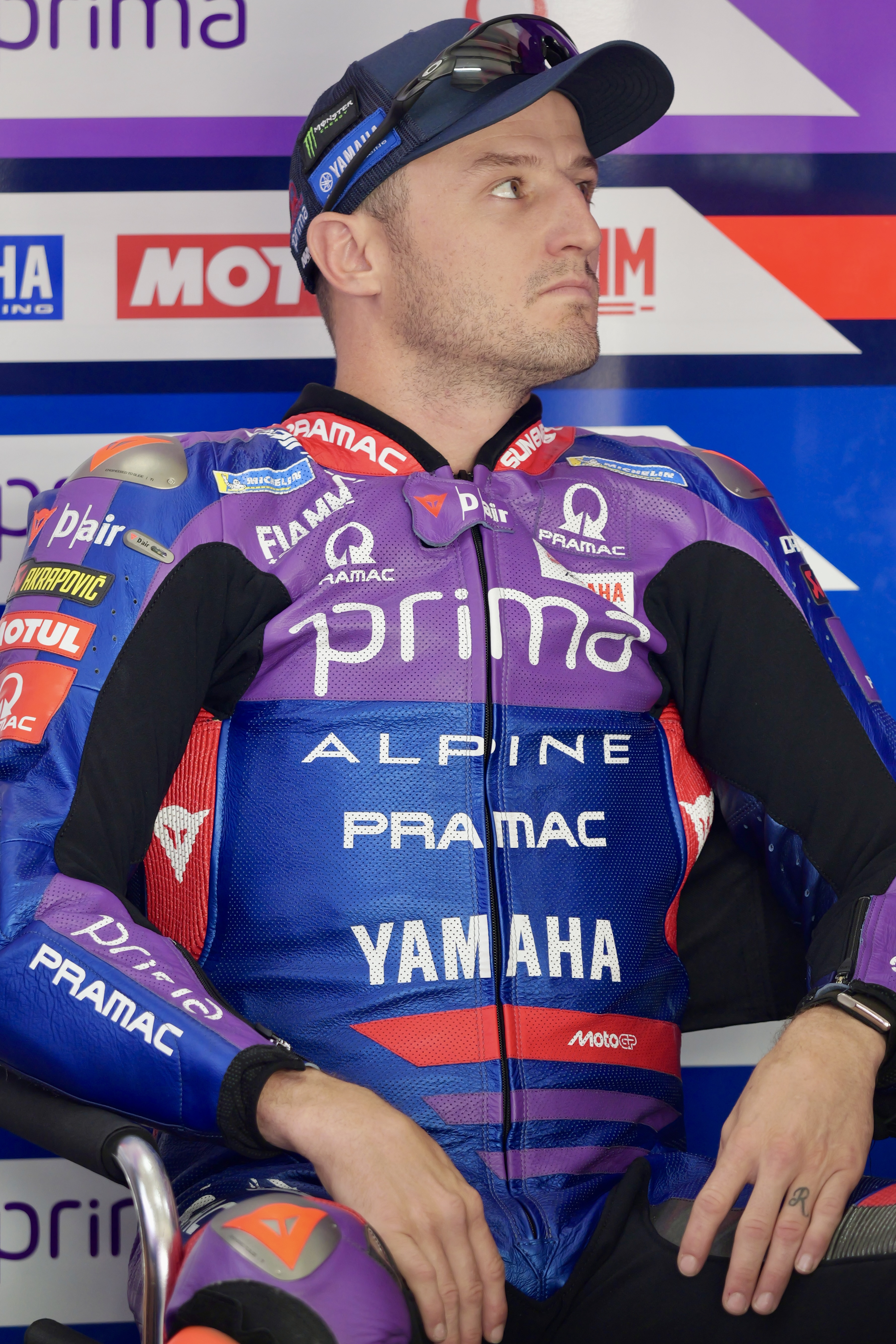
- Miller at the 2025 Malaysian Grand Prix
- Nationality: Australian
- Born: 18 January 1995 (age 31); Townsville, Queensland, Australia
- Current team: Prima Pramac Yamaha MotoGP
- Bike number: 43
Motorcycle racing career statistics
MotoGP World Championship
Active years	2015–
Manufacturers	Honda (2015–2017); Ducati (2018–2022); KTM (2023–2024); Yamaha (2025–)
Championships	0
2025 championship position	17th (79 pts)
Starts / Wins / Podiums / Poles / F. laps / Points; 217 / 4 / 23 / 2 / 3 / 1274
Moto3 World Championship
Active years	2012–2014
Manufacturers	Honda (2012); FTR Honda (2013); KTM (2014)
Championships	0
2014 championship position	2nd (276 pts)
Starts / Wins / Podiums / Poles / F. laps / Points; 49 / 6 / 10 / 8 / 1 / 403
125cc World Championship
Active years	2011
Manufacturers	Aprilia, KTM
Championships	0
2011 championship position	NC (0 pts)
Starts / Wins / Podiums / Poles / F. laps / Points; 6 / 0 / 0 / 0 / 0 / 0

Jack Peter Miller (born 18 January 1995) is an Australian Grand Prix motorcycle racer who rides for the Prima Pramac Yamaha MotoGP. He was the German 2011 IDM 125cc International Champion. Miller has won four races in the premier class, his first at the 2016 Dutch TT on a Marc VDS Honda, his second and third in consecutive weekends of May 2021, at Jerez, Spain, and Le Mans, France on a Ducati, and his fourth at the 2022 Motul Grand Prix of Japan, also on a Ducati. He has finished as the championship runner-up in the 2014 Moto3 World Championship. He is set to leave Pramac at the end of 2026 and he will move to the World Superbike Championship with Pata Maxus Yamaha.

Miller now uses the nickname 'Thriller', whereas earlier in his career he was known as 'Jackass'.

== Career ==
=== Early career ===
Born in Townsville, Queensland, Australia, Miller grew up on a property outside the city. A tropical city where he made his own fun, riding his motorbike and quad bike, water skiing and lending a hand with fencing and cattle mustering. His parents and siblings have supported his racing career every step of the way, helping him reach his goal of racing in the World Championship. Miller has been racing motorbikes since he was eight years old, originally starting on dirt bikes, where he was the Australian Dirt Bike champion in the 65cc category in 2003. He went on to win five other Australian championships in 2005, 2006 and 2007 and numerous other local and state titles in dirt bike racing and motocross events.

In 2011, Miller had his breakout year in Europe. A string of strong performances saw him win the championship in the German IDM 125cc category at the age of 16. This title won the attention of Caretta Technology's Forward Racing, an Italian race team who signed Miller to ride in the 2012 Moto3 Championship.

=== Moto3 World Championship (2012–2014) ===
==== Carretta Technology Forward Racing (2012) ====
2012 was Miller's first year in the Moto3 World Championship, riding for Caretta Technology Forward Racing on a Honda chassis. While the bike was not competitive, it allowed Miller the opportunity to learn the circuits he would be racing in the coming years. He finished 23rd in the Moto3 Championship that year with 17 points, and a best finish of fourth at the German Grand Prix, at the Sachsenring.

==== Racing Team Germany (2013) ====
Miller moved to Racing Team Germany for the 2013 season, riding an FTR Honda chassis. Miller achieved 13 points-scoring finishes during the season, and finished in seventh place in the final championship standings. His best results were two fifth places, at the San Marino race, and his home Australian Grand Prix.

==== Red Bull KTM Ajo (2014) ====
Miller moved to a factory-backed KTM motorcycle for the 2014 season, joining the Red Bull KTM Ajo team. He had a breakout season, recording his first fastest lap, pole position, podium finish and victory in the category. In total, he won six races during the season (Qatar, USA, France, Germany, Australia, and Valencia), and finished the season as runner-up to Álex Márquez in the championship, missing out on the title by just two points.

=== MotoGP World Championship (2015–2026) ===
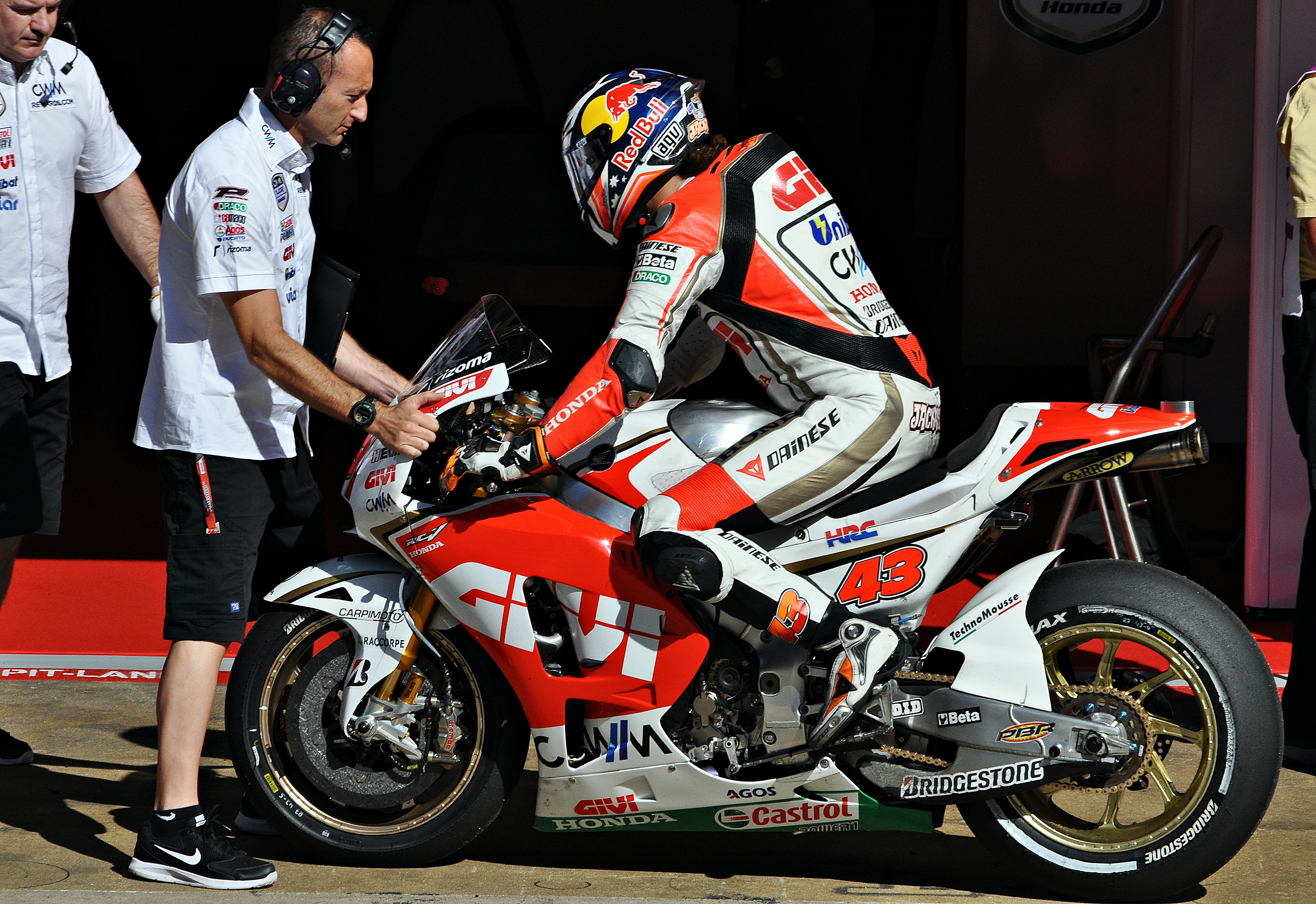
Jack Miller at the 2015 Catalan Grand Prix

==== CMW LCR Honda (2015) ====
For the 2015 season, Miller graduated into the MotoGP class, forming a part of an expanded two-rider Team LCR outfit, partnering Cal Crutchlow, and riding on an open specification Honda RC213V-RS. He achieved his best finish with 11th at Catalunya, following the British Grand Prix, where Miller moved up the order in the early stages, but collided with teammate Crutchlow on the third lap. Miller finished his rookie season in 19th place, with 17 points.

==== EG 0,0 Marc VDS (2016–2017) ====
===== 2016 =====
For the 2016 MotoGP World Championship, Miller moved to the Marc VDS Racing Team. Miller finished in 14th place at Qatar, and at Catalunya, he finished the race in a career best tenth place. On 26 June at Assen, Miller was running strongly in the top-ten, before the race was red flagged due to heavy rain. The race restarted for a 12 lap shootout, and Miller clung on to the leaders in the early laps. He was running in fourth by the end of lap 1, and inherited third when Andrea Dovizioso crashed, right behind factory Honda rider Marc Márquez. On lap 3, race leader Valentino Rossi crashed out, and a lap later Miller overtook Màrquez for the race lead. He held his nerve for the rest of the race and pulled away to claim his first premier class victory. He was the first Australian to win a MotoGP race since Casey Stoner in Australia 2012, and the first satellite rider to win a race since Toni Elias in Portugal in 2006. Miller's odds of winning going into the race were said to be 750–1, making it the biggest winning upset in MotoGP history. The rest of his season had mixed fortunes, with occasional speed being blighted by injuries, including a fractured vertebrae in Austria. He claimed three more top-ten finishes to end the year 18th in the standings, with 57 points.

===== 2017 =====
Miller returned to the team for 2017, and although sometimes seemed to lack the raw pace from the previous season, he matured and became a more consistent points scorer. This fact was recognised by Honda, who gave him a chance to ride their factory bike at the Suzuka 8 Hours. He recorded nine top-ten finishes during the season, with a best finish of sixth coming twice at Assen, and in the wet at Misano. Despite breaking his leg whilst training before Japan, he returned for his home race in Australia and led the early laps. He finished the year 11th in the standings, with 82 points.

==== Pramac Racing (2018–2020) ====
===== 2018 =====
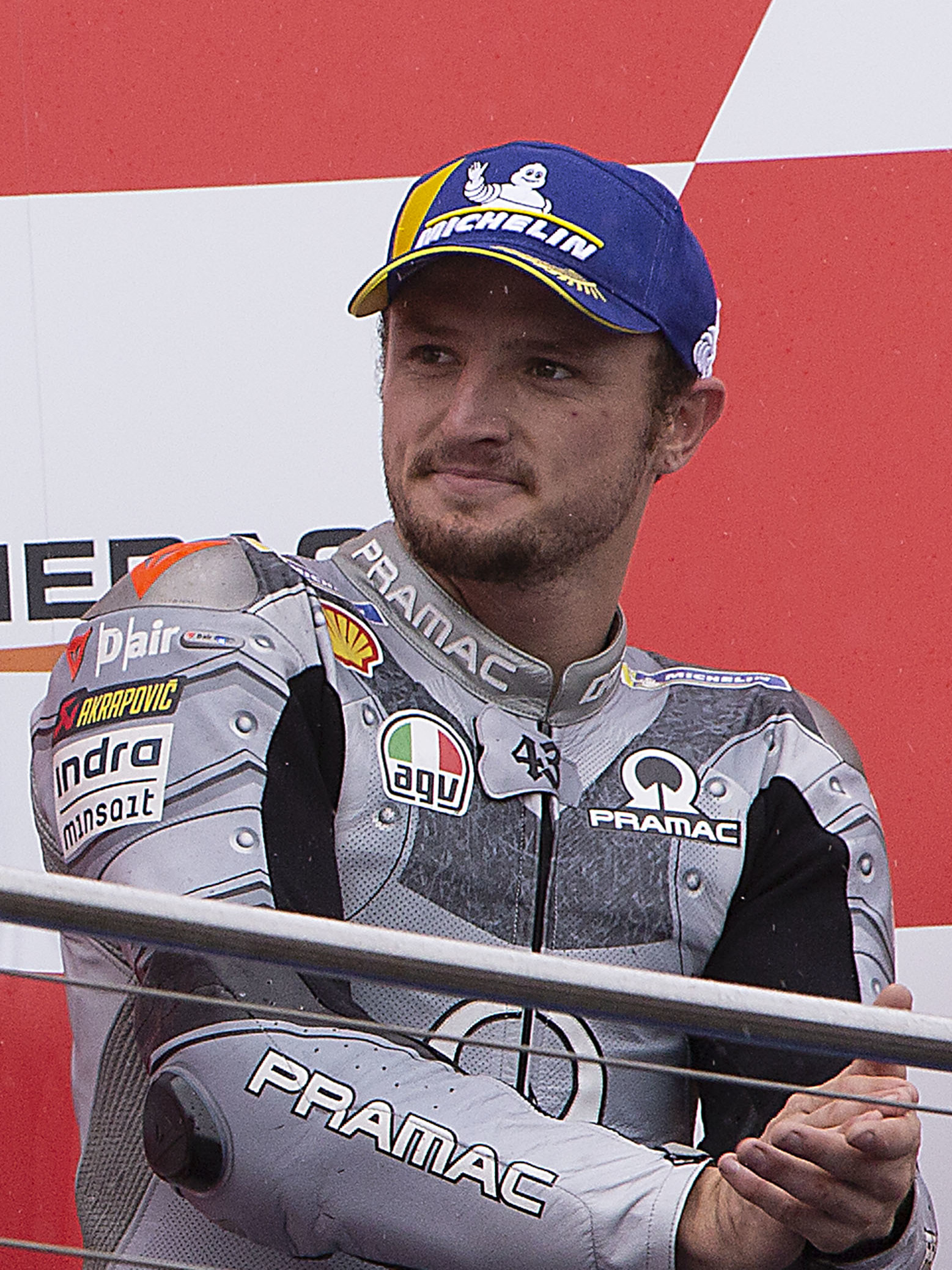
Miller at the 2019 Australian Grand Prix

In 2018, Miller moved to Pramac Racing, now riding a Ducati, siding Danilo Petrucci. However, unlike the Italian, he had to stick with a 2017-spec bike. Nevertheless, the Australian scored two fourth places in Argentina and France, and a pole position in Argentina too, finishing the season in 13th position, with 91 points.

===== 2019 =====
In 2019, Miller was riding a spec-19 Ducati, after Petrucci moved to the Ducati factory team. His teammate was 2018 Moto2 champion Francesco Bagnaia. The season started strongly for Miller, as in Qatar he qualified fourth, but was forced to retire in the race due to a broken seat while battling for the lead. Miller scored five podiums in Austin (his first podium since his 2016 Assen win), Brno, Aragon, Phillip Island and Valencia, all third places. He finished the season in eighth overall, with 165 points.

===== 2020 =====
For 2020, in his final season with Pramac Racing Ducati, Miller finished in the top ten in all races he finished, with a best finish of second at the Styrian, Valencian and Portuguese Grands Prix. However, Miller incurred several DNFs during the season, including at Andalusia due to error in the intense July heat at Jerez; the Emilia Romagna Grand Prix due to a tear-off visor from Fabio Quartararo being sucked into Miller's air intake, causing a reduction in power; a suspected engine failure also occurred while battling with the lead group at Le Mans; and the opening corners of the Teruel Grand Prix, where Brad Binder collided with Miller, ending both of their races. Miller closed off the 2020 season strongly with two second places, battling Franco Morbidelli spectacularly on the final lap in both Valencia and Portimao, and finished the season seventh in the championship, with 132 points.

==== Ducati Lenovo Team (2021–2022) ====
===== 2021 =====
During testing in Qatar, Miller, now aboard the factory Ducati team, set unofficial record lap times, but struggled in the races, finishing just ninth in both races held in Doha. During the second Qatar race Miller became frustrated and engaged in a tit for tat struggle with defending world champion Joan Mir: the sequence started when Mir made an aggressive overtake on Miller, causing Mir to briefly lose grip, needing to pick his bike up, and nearly running Miller off the track. Miller then retaliated by colliding with Mir heading down the back straight of the Losail International Circuit. Later in the race Miller provoked another near-accident that could have taken out both Mir and factory Yamaha rider Maverick Viñales, but Miller refused to apologize for the incidents, saying it was Mir who was at fault for any on-track encounters. Miller underwent successful surgery in Spain for compartment syndrome, and would be back to race in Portugal. At the Portuguese Grand Prix, he showed good pace all weekend, but crashed out early in the race. At the following races in Jerez, where he qualified third on the grid, Miller got a strong start of the line into first but was passed by Fabio Quartararo early on in the race. Miller took back the lead with seven laps left, after Quartararo himself suffered an arm-pump compartment syndrome, building up a one-second gap to his teammate Bagnaia to secure his first win of 2021. For Miller, this would be his second MotoGP win after a five-year gap, his first on a Ducati, and his first win in dry conditions. It was also Ducati's first win of 2021 and their first victory at Jerez since 2006. Miller followed up his win in Jerez with a flag to flag win at Le Mans the following weekend, which was notable because he overcame two long lap penalties to secure a dominant victory. He would finish third in Barcelona, before a mid-season bad run saw him drop out of championship contention. He ended the season well with two third places in Portimao and Valencia, overall closing his season with two wins, five podiums, 181 points, and fourth in the rider's championship.

===== 2022 =====
Miller finished in fifth in his final Ducati season, with a dominant victory at the Japanese Grand Prix. He scored podiums in America, France, Germany, Great Britain, Austria, and Thailand. At his home round in Melbourne, Turn 4 of the Phillip Island Grand Prix Circuit was renamed the 'Miller Corner' in his honour before the race. Just a day later, Miller was taken out of the Australian Grand Prix by satellite Honda rider Álex Márquez, who crashed into Miller from behind at Miller Corner.

==== Red Bull KTM Factory Racing (2023–2024) ====
===== 2023 =====
On 9 June 2022, Miller signed a contract with Red Bull KTM Factory Racing for 2023 and 2024, teaming up with Brad Binder. Miller finished 2023 in 11th, with a highlight performance at Jerez, with a third-placed finish in both the sprint and feature race.

===== 2024 =====
In 2024, Miller's performances was marked by struggles for form and consistency, as he ended the season in 14th and was replaced by rookie rider Pedro Acosta.

==== Prima Pramac Yamaha (2025–2026) ====
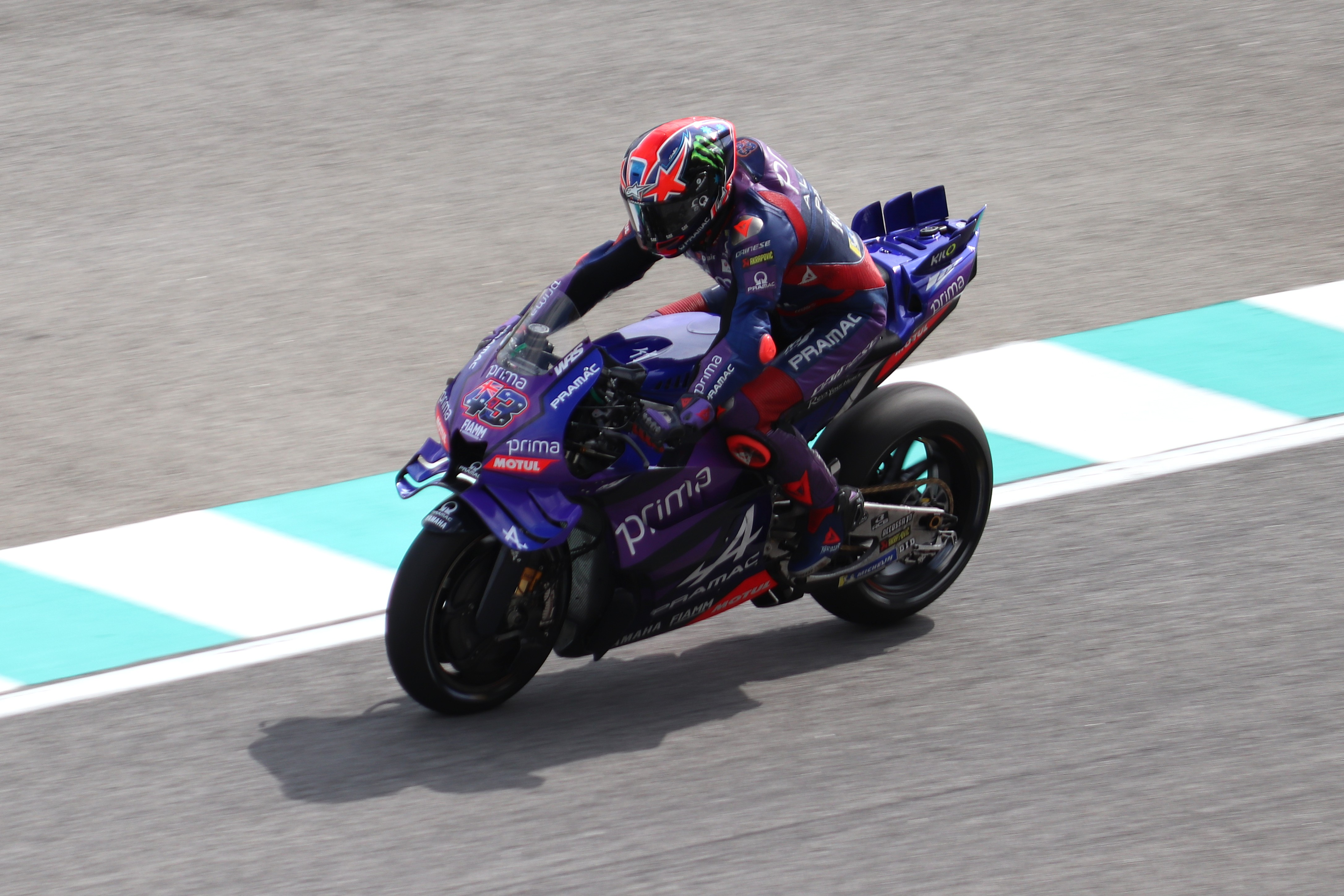
Miller at the 2025 Malaysian Grand Prix

===== 2025 =====
In 2025, Miller joined the Prima Pramac Yamaha MotoGP with Miguel Oliveira as his teammate. The first half of his 2025 season was underscored by oscillating performances, with fifth at Austin though also three successive DNFs at Lusail, Jerez, and Le Mans.

===== 2026 =====
Miller remained at Prima Pramac Yamaha MotoGP for the 2026 season; his teammate is three-time Superbike champion Toprak Razgatlıoğlu, who replaced Miguel Oliveira. Miller is set to leave Pramac at the end of 2026.

=== Superbike World Championship (2027–) ===
==== Pata Maxus Yamaha (2027–) ====
After leaving MotoGP, Miller is set to move to the Superbike World Championship with Pata Maxus Yamaha in 2027 on a two-year contract.

=== Australian Superbike Championship ===
==== 2021 ====
Miller closed his 2021 journey with a podium in the final Australian Superbike (ASBK) race. After closing the MotoGP season with a podium at the Valencia GP, Miller, riding the Ducati Panigale V4R, started from second place in his debut appearance at The Bend Motorsport Park Circuit. In the first race, Miller experienced DNF when he was in fourth place behind fellow Ducati rider who later won ASBK 2021 Wayne Maxwell, Glenn Alerton and Lachlan Epis, but in race two, he managed to finish and secure third place on the podium.

==== 2022 ====
Miller had a 'last dance' with Ducati in Australian Superbikes. In the race, Miller used a Ducati motorcycle, even though he was part of KTM and already had conducted tests with the RC-16. However, the Panigale V4R remained Miller's mainstay at ASBK.

=== Suzuka 8 Hours ===
In 2025, Miller tested at Suzuka Circuit ahead of 8-Hour Endurance Race, and missed Brno MotoGP test. He completed a crucial test at the Suzuka Circuit on the factory Yamaha YZF-R1. This test was part of his preparation for the prestigious Suzuka 8 Hours endurance race in early August, the 46th edition of the FIM Endurance World Championship “Coca-Cola” Suzuka 8 Hours Endurance Road Race. The free private test at Suzuka was a crucial opportunity for Miller. He was not alone on the track; he was supported by Japanese Yamaha veteran Katsuyuki Nakasuga and Italian rider Andrea Locatelli, who also tested at Suzuka. In addition to familiarizing himself with the track, the pit stop and rider handover aspects were the main focus, new areas that they intensively practiced.

== Personal life ==
Jack visited Pope Francis at the Vatican in 2018.

In early October 2022, Miller travelled from the far-Eastern World Championship motorcycle racing venues to be married in Australia. On 15 October 2022, turn four at the Phillip Island racing circuit was renamed from Honda Corner to Miller Corner.

== Nicknames ==
In his early grands prix career in Moto3, Miller was described as 'Jackass', when he also was an exponent of 'goon riding'. In the later stages of his race career, having risen to the MotoGP class, his nickname changed to 'Thriller'.

== Career statistics ==
=== Grand Prix motorcycle racing ===
==== By season ====
Season	Class	Motorcycle	Team	Race	Win	Podium	Pole	FLap	Pts	Plcd
2011	125cc	Aprilia	RZT Racing	1	0	0	0	0	0	NC
2011	125cc	KTM	Caretta Technology	5	0	0	0	0	0	NC
2012	Moto3	Honda	Caretta Technology	14	0	0	0	0	17	23rd
2013	Moto3	FTR Honda	Caretta Technology – RTG	17	0	0	0	0	110	7th
2014	Moto3	KTM	Red Bull KTM Ajo	18	6	10	8	1	276	**2nd**
2015	MotoGP	Honda	CWM LCR Honda	18	0	0	0	0	17	19th
2016	MotoGP	Honda	EG 0,0 Marc VDS	13	1	1	0	0	57	18th
2017	MotoGP	Honda	EG 0,0 Marc VDS	17	0	0	0	0	82	11th
2018	MotoGP	Ducati	Pramac Racing	18	0	0	1	0	91	13th
2019	MotoGP	Ducati	Pramac Racing	19	0	5	0	1	165	8th
2020	MotoGP	Ducati	Pramac Racing	14	0	4	0	1	132	7th
2021	MotoGP	Ducati	Ducati Lenovo Team	18	2	5	0	0	181	4th
2022	MotoGP	Ducati	Ducati Lenovo Team	20	1	7	1	1	189	5th
2023	MotoGP	KTM	Red Bull KTM Factory Racing	20	0	1	0	0	163	11th
2024	MotoGP	KTM	Red Bull KTM Factory Racing	19	0	0	0	0	87	14th
2025	MotoGP	Yamaha	Prima Pramac Yamaha MotoGP	22	0	0	0	0	79	17th
2026	MotoGP	Yamaha	Prima Pramac Yamaha MotoGP	19	0	0	0	0	31*	19th*
Total				**272**	**10**	**33**	**10**	**4**	**1677**	

==== By class ====
Class	Seasons	1st GP	1st pod	1st win	Race	Win	Podiums	Pole	FLap	Pts	WChmp
125cc	2011	2011 Germany			6	0	0	0	0	0	0
Moto3	2012–2014	2012 Qatar	2014 Qatar	2014 Qatar	49	6	10	8	1	403	0
MotoGP	2015–present	2015 Qatar	2016 Netherlands	2016 Netherlands	217	4	23	2	3	1274	0
Total	2011–present				**272**	**10**	**33**	**10**	**4**	**1677**	**0**

==== Races by year ====
(key) (Races in bold indicate pole position; races in italics indicate fastest lap)

Year	Class	Bike	1	2	3	4	5	6	7	8	9	10	11	12	13	14	15	16	17	18	19	20	21	22	Pos	Pts
2011	125cc	Aprilia	QAT	SPA	POR	FRA	CAT	GBR	NED	ITA	GER; Ret	CZE	INP												NC	0
2011	125cc	KTM													RSM; 24	ARA	JPN; 16	AUS; 23	MAL; 16	VAL; Ret					NC	0
2012	Moto3	Honda	QAT; 25	SPA; Ret	POR	FRA; Ret	CAT; 15	GBR; Ret	NED; DSQ	GER; 4	ITA; 21	INP; DNS	CZE	RSM; Ret	ARA; 19	JPN; 19	MAL; 13	AUS; 21	VAL; Ret						23rd	17
2013	Moto3	FTR Honda	QAT; 16	AME; 6	SPA; Ret	FRA; 12	ITA; 10	CAT; 7	NED; 7	GER; 7	INP; Ret	CZE; 7	GBR; 7	RSM; 5	ARA; 13	MAL; 6	AUS; 5	JPN; 6	VAL; Ret						7th	110
2014	Moto3	KTM	QAT; 1	**AME**; 1	**ARG**; 3	**SPA**; 4	FRA; 1	ITA; Ret	CAT; 4	**NED**; Ret	**GER**; 1	**INP**; 3	CZE; 5	GBR; 6	**RSM**; 3	ARA; 27	JPN; 5	AUS; 1	**MAL**; 2	VAL; 1					2nd	276
2015	MotoGP	Honda	QAT; Ret	AME; 14	ARG; 12	SPA; 20	FRA; Ret	ITA; Ret	CAT; 11	NED; Ret	GER; 15	INP; Ret	CZE; 19	GBR; Ret	RSM; 12	ARA; 19	JPN; Ret	AUS; 15	MAL; 17	VAL; 21					19th	17
2016	MotoGP	Honda	QAT; 14	ARG; Ret	AME; DNS	SPA; 17	FRA; Ret	ITA; Ret	CAT; 10	NED; 1	GER; 7	AUT; DNS	CZE	GBR; 16	RSM; DNS	ARA	JPN; Ret	AUS; 10	MAL; 8	VAL; 15					18th	57
2017	MotoGP	Honda	QAT; 8	ARG; 9	AME; 10	SPA; Ret	FRA; 8	ITA; 15	CAT; Ret	NED; 6	GER; 15	CZE; 14	AUT; Ret	GBR; 16	RSM; 6	ARA; 13	JPN	AUS; 7	MAL; 8	VAL; 7					11th	82
2018	MotoGP	Ducati	QAT; 10	**ARG**; 4	AME; 9	SPA; 6	FRA; 4	ITA; Ret	CAT; Ret	NED; 10	GER; 14	CZE; 12	AUT; 18	GBR; C	RSM; 18	ARA; 9	THA; 10	JPN; Ret	AUS; 7	MAL; 8	VAL; Ret				13th	91
2019	MotoGP	Ducati	QAT; Ret	ARG; 4	AME; 3	SPA; Ret	FRA; 4	ITA; Ret	CAT; 5	NED; 9	GER; 6	CZE; 3	AUT; Ret	GBR; 8	RSM; 9	ARA; 3	THA; 14	JPN; 10	AUS; 3	MAL; 8	VAL; 3				8th	165
2020	MotoGP	Ducati	SPA; 4	ANC; Ret	CZE; 9	AUT; 3	STY; 2	RSM; 8	EMI; Ret	CAT; 5	FRA; Ret	ARA; 9	TER; Ret	EUR; 6	VAL; 2	POR; 2									7th	132
2021	MotoGP	Ducati	QAT; 9	DOH; 9	POR; Ret	SPA; 1	FRA; 1	ITA; 6	CAT; 3	GER; 6	NED; Ret	STY; Ret	AUT; 11	GBR; 4	ARA; 5	RSM; 5	AME; 7	EMI; Ret	ALR; 3	VAL; 3					4th	181
2022	MotoGP	Ducati	QAT; Ret	INA; 4	ARG; 14	AME; 3	POR; Ret	SPA; 5	FRA; 2	ITA; 15	CAT; 14	GER; 3	NED; 6	GBR; 3	AUT; 3	**RSM**; 18	ARA; 5	JPN; 1	THA; 2	AUS; Ret	MAL; 6	VAL; Ret			5th	189
2023	MotoGP	KTM	POR; 7^{4}	ARG; 6	AME; Ret^{9}	SPA; 3^{3}	FRA; Ret	ITA; 7^{6}	GER; 6^{3}	NED; Ret	GBR; 8^{7}	AUT; 15^{5}	CAT; 8	RSM; Ret	IND; 14^{7}	JPN; 6^{4}	INA; 7^{9}	AUS; 7	THA; 16	MAL; 8^{6}	QAT; 9	VAL; Ret			11th	163
2024	MotoGP	KTM	QAT; 21	POR; 5^{5}	AME; 13^{7}	SPA; Ret	FRA; Ret^{8}	CAT; Ret^{7}	ITA; 16	NED; 11	GER; 13	GBR; 12^{7}	AUT; 18^{5}	ARA; 15	RSM; 8^{8}	EMI; 16	INA; Ret	JPN; 10^{8}	AUS; 11	THA; 5	MAL; DNS^{8}	SLD; 13			14th	87
2025	MotoGP	Yamaha	THA; 11	ARG; 13	AME; 5	QAT; Ret	SPA; Ret	FRA; Ret	GBR; 7^{9}	ARA; 14	ITA; Ret	NED; 14	GER; 8	CZE; 10	AUT; 18	HUN; Ret	CAT; 14	RSM; 12	JPN; Ret	INA; 14	AUS; Ret^{4}	MAL; 14	POR; 12	VAL; 9	17th	79
2026	MotoGP	Yamaha	THA; 18	BRA; Ret	USA; 16	SPA; 18	FRA; 15	CAT; 15	ITA; 15	HUN; 8	CZE; 16	NED; 12	GER; 12	GBR; 12	ARA; 11	RSM; Ret	AUT; 21	JPN; 19	INA; Ret	AUS; C^{7}	MAL; 16	QAT; DNA	POR	VAL	19th*	31*

=== Australian Superbike Championship ===
==== Races by year ====
(key) (Races in bold indicate pole position; races in italics indicate fastest lap)

Year	Bike	1		2		3		4		5		6		7		8		9		Pos	Pts
Year	Bike	R1	R2	R1	R2	R1	R2	R1	R2	R1	R2	R1	R2	R1	R2	R1	R2	R1	R2	Pos	Pts
2021	Ducati	PHI; C	PHI; C	WIN	WIN	WAK	WAK	HID	HID	WAK	WAK	PHI	PHI	BEN; Ret	BEN; 3	BEN	BEN	PHI	PHI	23rd	18

Year	Bike	1		2		3		4			5		6			7		Pos	Pts
Year	Bike	R1	R2	R1	R2	R1	R2	R1	R2	R3	R1	R2	R1	R2	R3	R1	R2	Pos	Pts
2022	Ducati	PHI	PHI	QUE	QUE	WAK	WAK	HID	HID	HID	MOR	MOR	PHI	PHI	PHI	BEN; Ret	BEN; 4	29th	17

=== Suzuka 8 Hours ===
Year	Class	Team	Co-riders	Bike	Pos
2017	**EWC**	(Japan) Musashi RT Harc-Pro Honda	(Japan) Takumi Takahashi (Japan) Takaaki Nakagami	Honda CBR1000RR SP2	4th
2025	**EWC**	(Japan) Yamaha Racing Team	(Japan) Katsuyuki Nakasuga (Italy) Andrea Locatelli	Yamaha YZF-R1	2nd
2026	**EWC**	(Japan) Yamaha Racing Team	(Japan) Katsuyuki Nakasuga (Italy) Andrea Locatelli	Yamaha YZF-R1	2nd
