= James Millar (educationalist) =

Scottish labour-movement educationalist

James Millar (J. P. M. Millar) (1893–1989) was a Scottish working-class educationalist of the twentieth century.

== Early life ==
Millar, the son of an accountant, James Primrose Malcolm Millar, was born in Edinburgh on 17 April 1893. He attended Musselburgh Grammar School leaving at sixteen to take up an apprenticeship with an insurance company. His father was chief accountant to the Edinburgh City Chamberlain. His conservative political outlook was originally inherited by James.

In 1923 he succeeded George Sims as General Secretary of the National Council of Labour Colleges. In this capacity he organised the loose network of labour colleges throughout Great Britain into eleven regional divisions, which each had a divisional organiser. As funds from trade unions were paid to the National Council, this meant that regional autonomy was eroded: although each division elected its own Council and executive committee, the divisional organiser was appointed nationally.
