= Jimmy Millar =

Jimmy Millar may refer to:

- Jimmy Millar (footballer, born 1876) (1876–1932), Scottish footballer who played for Middlesbrough, Bradford City and Aberdeen
- Jimmy Millar (footballer, born 1934) (1934–2022), Scottish footballer who played for Rangers and the Scotland national team

== See also ==
- Jimmy Miller (disambiguation)
- James Millar (disambiguation)
