= Bryan Staring =

Australian motorcycle racer (born 1987)

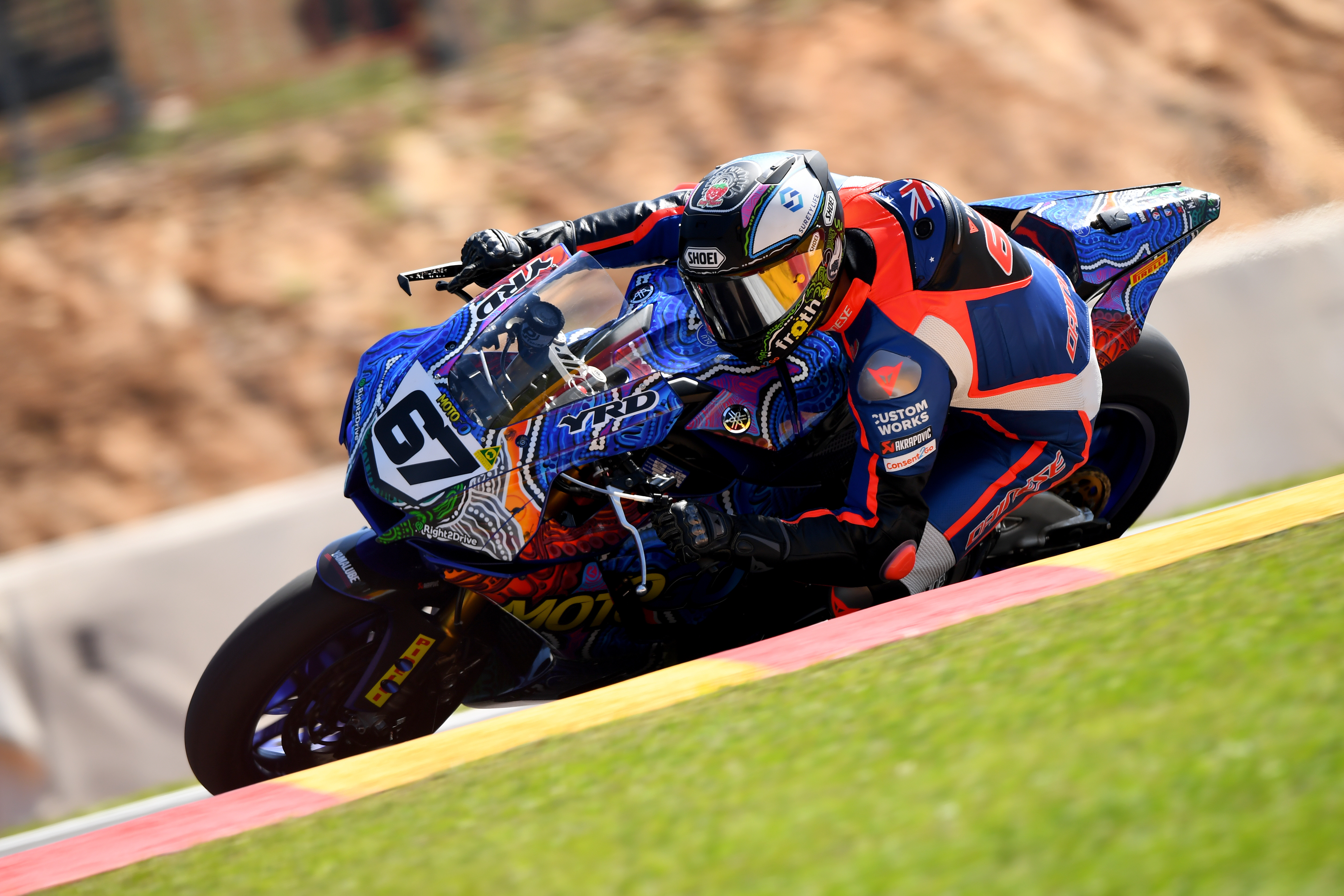
- Staring at Hidden Valley Raceway in 2023
- Nationality: Australian
- Born: 1 June 1987 (age 39); Perth, Australia
- Current team: MotoGo Yamaha Racing
- Bike number: 67
Motorcycle racing career statistics
MotoGP World Championship
Active years	2013
Manufacturers	FTR Honda
Championships	0
2013 championship position	26th (2 pts)
Starts / Wins / Podiums / Poles / F. laps / Points; 18 / 0 / 0 / 0 / 0 / 2
Moto2 World Championship
Active years	2018
Manufacturers	Tech 3
Championships	0
2018 championship position	40th (0 pt)
Starts / Wins / Podiums / Poles / F. laps / Points; 1 / 0 / 0 / 0 / 0 / 0
125cc World Championship
Active years	2004
Manufacturers	Honda
Starts / Wins / Podiums / Poles / F. laps / Points; 1 / 0 / 0 / 0 / 0 / 0
Superbike World Championship
Active years	2011–2012, 2014
Manufacturers	Kawasaki
Championships	0
Starts / Wins / Podiums / Poles / F. laps / Points; 18 / 0 / 0 / 0 / 0 / 25
Supersport World Championship
Active years	2008, 2014
Manufacturers	Honda
Championships	0
Starts / Wins / Podiums / Poles / F. laps / Points; 2 / 0 / 0 / 0 / 0 / 0

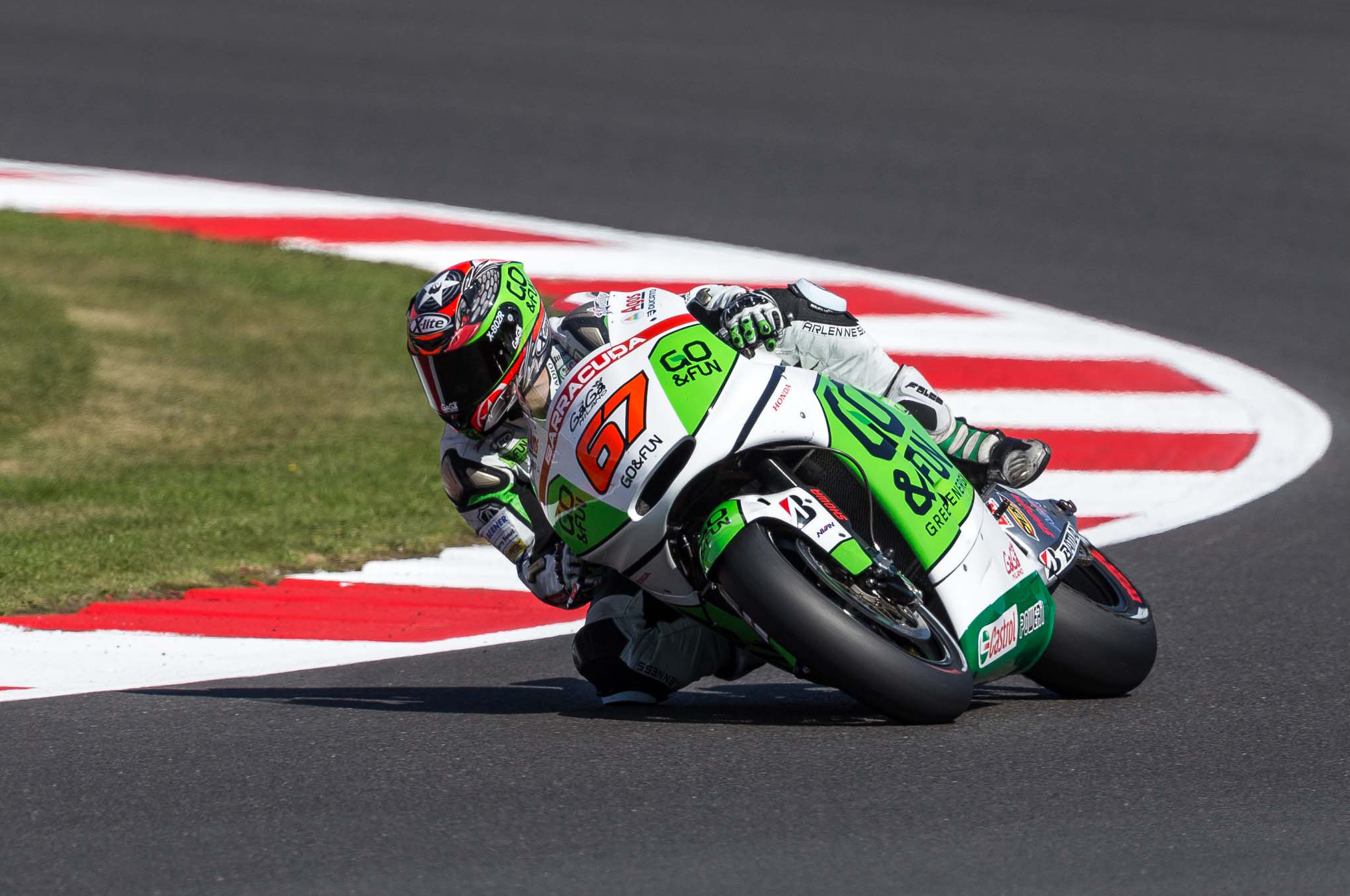
Staring at the 2013 British Grand Prix

Bryan Robert Staring (/ˈstɑːrɪŋ/ STAR-ing; born 1 June 1987 in Perth) is an Australian Grand Prix motorcycle racer, who last competed in the 2023 Australian Superbike Championship (ASBK), aboard a Yamaha YZF-R1M for the MotoGo Yamaha Racing Team, owned by Patrick Li, the owner of the MotoGo Motorcycles, a motorcycle dealership located Bentleigh, Victoria.

The 2023 season saw Staring finishing in seventh place overall in the Australian Superbike Championship, which was held over seven rounds, across four different states and the Northern Territory (Hidden Valley Raceway in Darwin in June, which ran alongside the Repco Supercars Championship).

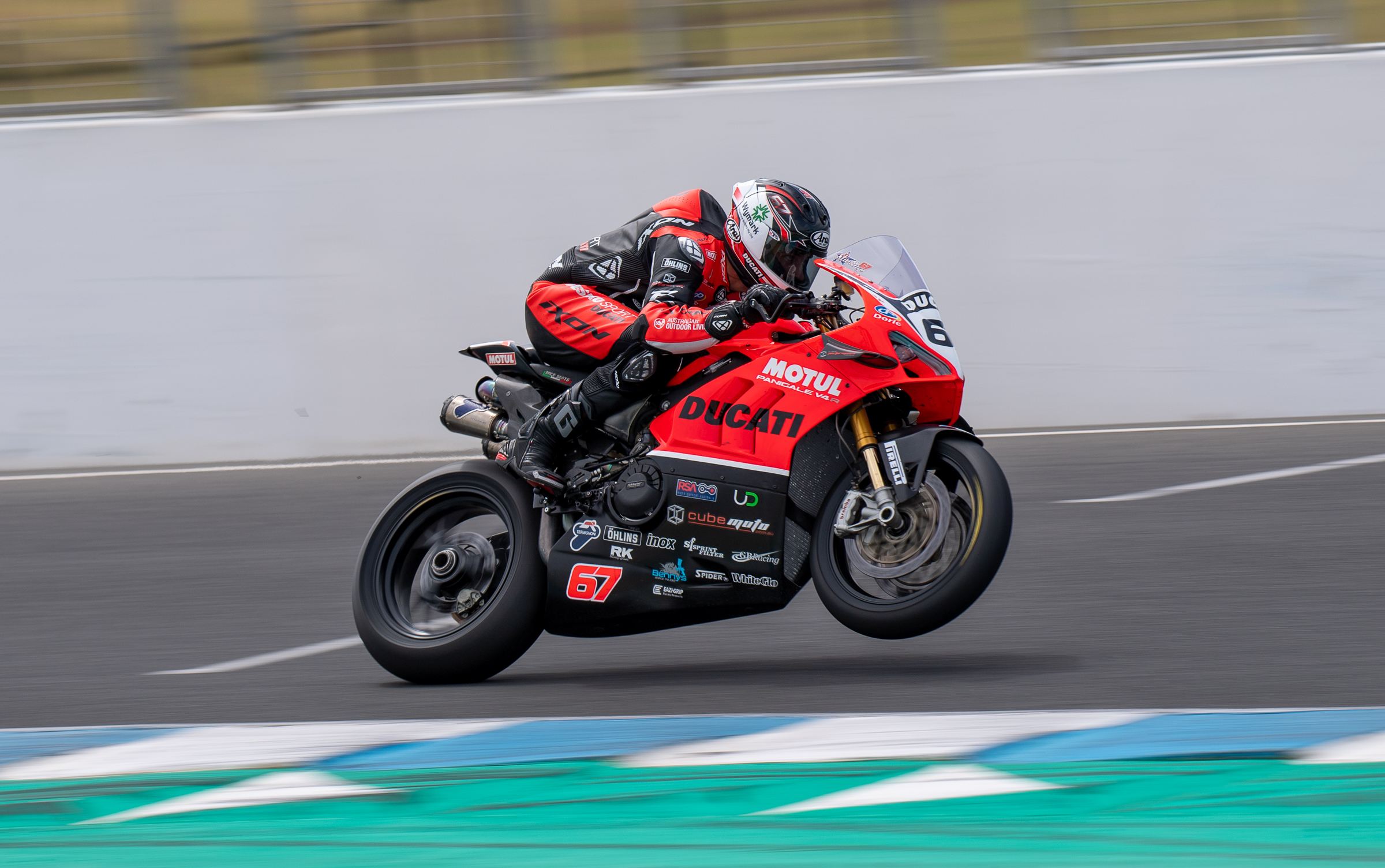
Bryan Staring aboard the DesmoSport Ducati Panigale V4 R in 2022

In 2017, Staring returned to the Australian Superbike Championship aboard a Honda CBR1000RR for Crankt Honda after racing internationally in the FIM Superstock Championship, WorldSBK and MotoGP World Championship. He competed for Go & Fun Honda Gresini in the 2013 MotoGP World Championship. He is a former race-winner in the FIM Superstock 1000 Cup – winning three times in 2012, en route to finishing fourth in the championship – and has also competed in the Supersport World Championship and the Superbike World Championship.

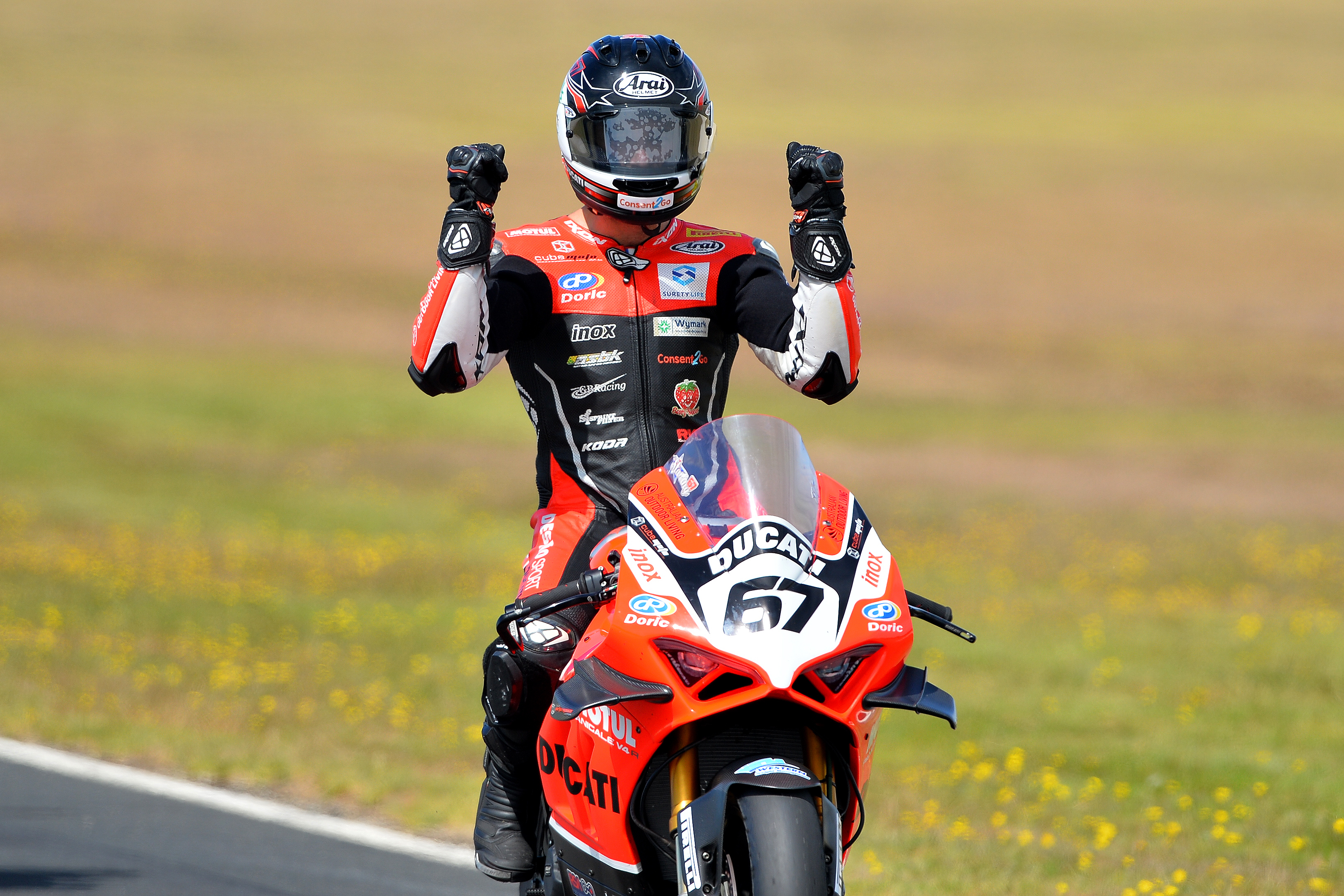
Round 1 and race 1 win at Phillip Island in the 2022 ASBK season with the DesmoSport Ducati team. Image Russell Colvin

== Career statistics ==
=== Career highlights ===
- 2011 - 11th, FIM Superstock 1000 Cup, Kawasaki ZX-10R
- 2012 - 4th, FIM Superstock 1000 Cup, Kawasaki ZX-10R
- 2015 - 9th, FIM Superstock 1000 Cup, Kawasaki ZX-10R
- 2016 - 16th, FIM Superstock 1000 Cup, Kawasaki ZX-10R

=== Grand Prix motorcycle racing ===
==== By season ====
Season	Class	Motorcycle	Team	Number	Race	Win	Podium	Pole	FLap	Pts	Plcd
2004	125 cc	Honda	Allect Barter Card Racing	92	1	0	0	0	0	0	NC
2013	MotoGP	FTR Honda	GO&FUN Honda Gresini	67	18	0	0	0	0	2	26th
2018	Moto2	Tech 3	Tech 3 Racing	67	1	0	0	0	0	0	40th
Total					**20**	**0**	**0**	**0**	**0**	**2**	

==== Races by year ====
(key) (Races in bold indicate pole position, races in italics indicate fastest lap)

Year	Class	Bike	1	2	3	4	5	6	7	8	9	10	11	12	13	14	15	16	17	18	19	Pos.	Pts
2004	125cc	Honda	RSA	SPA	FRA	ITA	CAT	NED	BRA	GER	GBR	CZE	POR	JPN	QAT	MAL	AUS; 29	VAL				NC	0
2013	MotoGP	FTR Honda	QAT; Ret	AME; 20	SPA; 16	FRA; Ret	ITA; 18	CAT; 14	NED; 21	GER; Ret	USA; 17	INP; 19	CZE; 20	GBR; 21	RSM; Ret	ARA; 18	MAL; 18	AUS; DSQ	JPN; 22	VAL; 19		26th	2
2018	Moto2	Tech 3	QAT	ARG	AME	SPA	FRA	ITA	CAT	NED	GER	CZE	AUT	GBR	RSM	ARA	THA	JPN	AUS; 21	MAL	VAL	40th	0

=== FIM Superstock 1000 Championship ===
==== Races by year ====
Year	Team	1	2	3	4	5	6	7	8	9	Pos.	Pts
2011	Kawasaki	NED; 5	SMR; 11	SPA; 8	CZE; Ret	GBR; 12	GER; 10	ITA; 12	FRA; 11	POR; 4	11th	56
2012	Kawasaki	ITA; 5	NED; Ret	SMR; 7	SPA; 1	CZE; 1	GBR; 3	**GER**; Ret	POR; 1	FRA; 5	4th	122
2015	Kawasaki	SPA; 6	NED; 8	ITA; Ret	GBR; 12	POR; 6	SMR; 9	SPA; 9	FRA; 9		9th	53
2016	Kawasaki	ARA; 12	NED; 19	IMO	DON	MIS	LAU; 2	MAG; 14	JER; Ret		16th	26

=== Supersport World Championship ===
==== Races by year ====
(key) (Races in bold indicate pole position) (Races in italics indicate fastest lap)

Year	Bike	1	2	3	4	5	6	7	8	9	10	11	12	13	Pos.	Pts
2008	Honda	QAT	AUS	SPA	NED	ITA	GER	SMR	CZE	GBR	EUR; 22	ITA	FRA	POR	NC	0
2014	Honda	AUS; Ret	SPA	NED	ITA	GBR	MAL	SMR	POR	SPA	FRA	QAT			NC	0

=== Superbike World Championship ===
==== Races by year ====
Year	Make	1		2		3		4		5		6		7		8		9		10		11		12		13		14		Pos.	Pts
Year	Make	R1	R2	R1	R2	R1	R2	R1	R2	R1	R2	R1	R2	R1	R2	R1	R2	R1	R2	R1	R2	R1	R2	R1	R2	R1	R2	R1	R2	Pos.	Pts
2011	Kawasaki	AUS; 15	AUS; 17	EUR	EUR	NED	NED	ITA	ITA	USA	USA	SMR	SMR	SPA	SPA	CZE	CZE	GBR	GBR	GER	GER	ITA	ITA	FRA	FRA	POR	POR			35th	1
2012	Kawasaki	AUS; 10	AUS; 16	ITA	ITA	NED	NED	ITA	ITA	EUR	EUR	USA	USA	SMR	SMR	SPA	SPA	CZE	CZE	GBR	GBR	RUS	RUS	GER	GER	POR	POR	FRA	FRA	31st	6
2014	Kawasaki	AUS	AUS	SPA	SPA	NED	NED	ITA	ITA	GBR; DNS	GBR; DNS	MAL; 13	MAL; 16	SMR; 18	SMR; 18	POR; NC	POR; 14	USA; 13	USA; 12	SPA; Ret	SPA; Ret	FRA; 14	FRA; Ret	QAT; 15	QAT; 13					22nd	18

=== British Superbike Championship ===
Year	Make	1			2			3			4			5			6			7			8			9			10			11			12			Pos	Pts
Year	Make	R1	R2	R3	R1	R2	R3	R1	R2	R3	R1	R2	R3	R1	R2	R3	R1	R2	R3	R1	R2	R3	R1	R2	R3	R1	R2	R3	R1	R2	R3	R1	R2	R3	R1	R2	R3	Pos	Pts
2014	Kawasaki	BHI	BHI		OUL	OUL		SNE	SNE		KNO	KNO		BHGP	BHGP		THR	THR		OUL	OUL	OUL	CAD	CAD		DON	DON		ASS	ASS		SIL	SIL		BHGP; 17	BHGP; Ret	BHGP; 16	NC	0

=== Australian Superbike Championship ===
==== Races by year ====
(key) (Races in bold indicate pole position; races in italics indicate fastest lap)

Year	Bike	1		2		3		4			5		6			7		Pos	Pts
Year	Bike	R1	R2	R1	R2	R1	R2	R1	R2	R3	R1	R2	R1	R2	R3	R1	R2	Pos	Pts
2022	Ducati	PHI; 1	PHI; 2	QUE; 16	QUE; 2	WAK; 5	WAK; 5	HID; 3	HID; 3	HID; 4	MOR; 5	MOR; 3	PHI; 1	PHI; 6	PHI; 2	BEN; Ret	BEN; 12	3rd	258
