= William E. Moerner =

Nobel prize winning American chemical physicist (born 1953)

- Moerner in 2024
- Born: William Esco Moerner; June 24, 1953 (age 73); Pleasanton, California, U.S.
- Education: Washington University in St. Louis; Cornell University
- Awards: Wolf Prize in Chemistry (2008); Irving Langmuir Award (2009); Peter Debye Award (2013); Nobel Prize in Chemistry (2014)
- Scientific career
- Fields: Chemistry, applied physics, biophysics
- Workplaces: Stanford University; UC San Diego
- Thesis: Vibrational relaxation dynamics of an IR-laser-excited molecular impurity mode in alkali halide lattices (1982)
- Doctoral advisor: Albert J. Sievers
- Other academic advisors: James Gegan Miller

William Esco Moerner, also known as W. E. Moerner, (born June 24, 1953) is an American physical chemist and chemical physicist who is the Harry S. Mosher Professor of Chemistry, Emeritus, at Stanford University. Moerner is credited with achieving the first optical detection and spectroscopy of a single molecule in condensed phases, along with his postdoc, Lothar Kador. Optical study of single molecules has since become a widely used single-molecule experiment in chemistry, physics and biology. In 2014, Moerner was awarded the Nobel Prize in Chemistry, together with Eric Betzig and Stefan W. Hell, "for the development of super-resolved fluorescence microscopy".

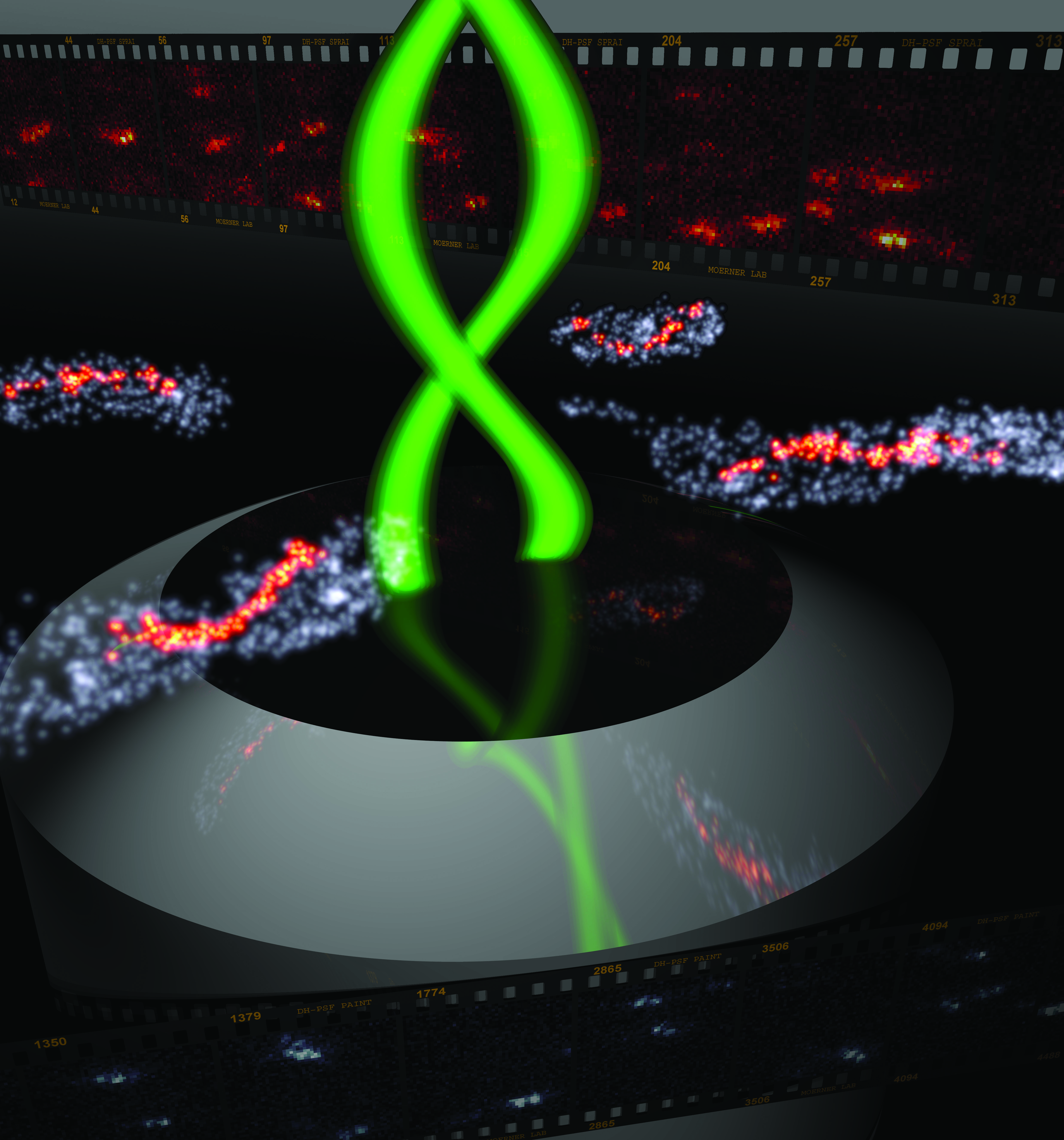
Bacteria-3D-Double-Helix. This image shows 3D super-resolution imaging of Caulobacter crescentus bacteria cell surfaces (gray) and a labeled protein (CreS, orange-red) obtained using the double-helix single-molecule active control microscopy technique.

== Early life and education ==
Moerner was born in Pleasanton, California on June 24, 1953, the son of Bertha Frances (Robinson) and William Alfred Moerner. He attended Washington University in St. Louis for undergraduate studies as an Alexander S. Langsdorf Engineering Fellow, and obtained three degrees: a B.S. in physics, a B.S. in electrical engineering, and an A.B. in mathematics in 1975.

He then pursued graduate study, partially supported by a National Science Foundation, at Cornell University in the group of Albert J. Sievers III. Here he received an M.S. degree and a Ph.D. degree in physics in 1978 and 1982, respectively. His doctoral thesis was on vibrational relaxation dynamics of an IR-laser-excited molecular impurity mode in alkali halide lattices.

== Career ==
Moerner worked at the IBM Almaden Research Center in San Jose, California, as a research staff member from 1981 to 1988, a manager from 1988 to 1989, and project leader from 1989 to 1995. After an appointment as visiting guest professor of physical chemistry at ETH Zurich (1993–1994), he assumed the distinguished chair in physical chemistry in the department of chemistry and biochemistry at the University of California, San Diego, from 1995 to 1998. In 1997 he was named the Robert Burns Woodward Visiting Professor at Harvard University. His research group moved to Stanford University in 1998, where he became professor of chemistry (1998), Harry S. Mosher Professor (2003), and professor, by courtesy, of applied physics (2005). Moerner was appointed department chair for chemistry from 2011 to 2014. His current areas of research and interest include: single-molecule spectroscopy and super-resolution microscopy, physical chemistry, chemical physics, biophysics, nanoparticle trapping, nanophotonics, photorefractive polymers, and spectral hole-burning. As of May 2014, Moerner was listed as a faculty advisor in 26 theses written by Stanford graduate students.

Recent editorial and advisory boards Moerner has served on include: member of the Board of Scientific Counselors for the National Institute of Biomedical Imaging and Bioengineering (NIBIB); Advisory board member for the Institute of Atomic and Molecular Sciences, Academica Sinica, Taiwan; advisory editorial board member for Chemical Physics Letters; advisory board member for the Center for Biomedical Imaging at Stanford; and chair of Stanford University's health and safety committee.

=== Awards and honors ===
Moerner is the recipient the National Winner of the Outstanding Young Professional Award for 1984, from the electrical engineering honorary society, Eta Kappa Nu, April 22, 1985; IBM Outstanding Technical Achievement Award for Photon-Gated Spectral Hole-Burning, July 11, 1988; IBM Outstanding Technical Achievement Award for Single-Molecule Detection and Spectroscopy, November 22, 1992; Earle K. Plyler Prize for Molecular Spectroscopy, American Physical Society, 2001; Wolf Prize in Chemistry, 2008; Irving Langmuir Award in Chemical Physics, American Physical Society, 2009; Pittsburgh Spectroscopy Award, 2012; Peter Debye Award in Physical Chemistry, American Chemical Society, 2013; the Engineering Alumni Achievement Award, Washington University, 2013; and the Nobel Prize in Chemistry, 2014. Moerner also holds more than a dozen patents.

His honorary memberships include Senior Member, IEEE, June 17, 1988, and Member, National Academy of Sciences, 2007. He is also a Fellow of the Optical Society of America, May 28, 1992; the American Physical Society, November 16, 1992; the American Academy of Arts and Sciences, 2001; and the American Association for the Advancement of Science, 2004.

== Personal life ==
Moerner was born on June 24, 1953, at Parks Air Force Base in Pleasanton, California. From birth, his family called him by his initials W. E. as a way to distinguish him from his father and grandfather who are also named William. He grew up in Texas where he attended Thomas Jefferson High School in San Antonio. He participated in many activities during high school: Band, Speech and Debate, Math and Science Contest Team, Bi-Phy-Chem, Masque and Gavel, National Honor Society, Boy Scouts, Amateur Radio Club, Russian Club, Forum Social Club, Toastmasters, "On the Spot" Team and Editor of Each has Spoken. Moerner and his wife, Sharon, have one son, Daniel.
