= Daniel Falzon =

Australian motorcycle racer

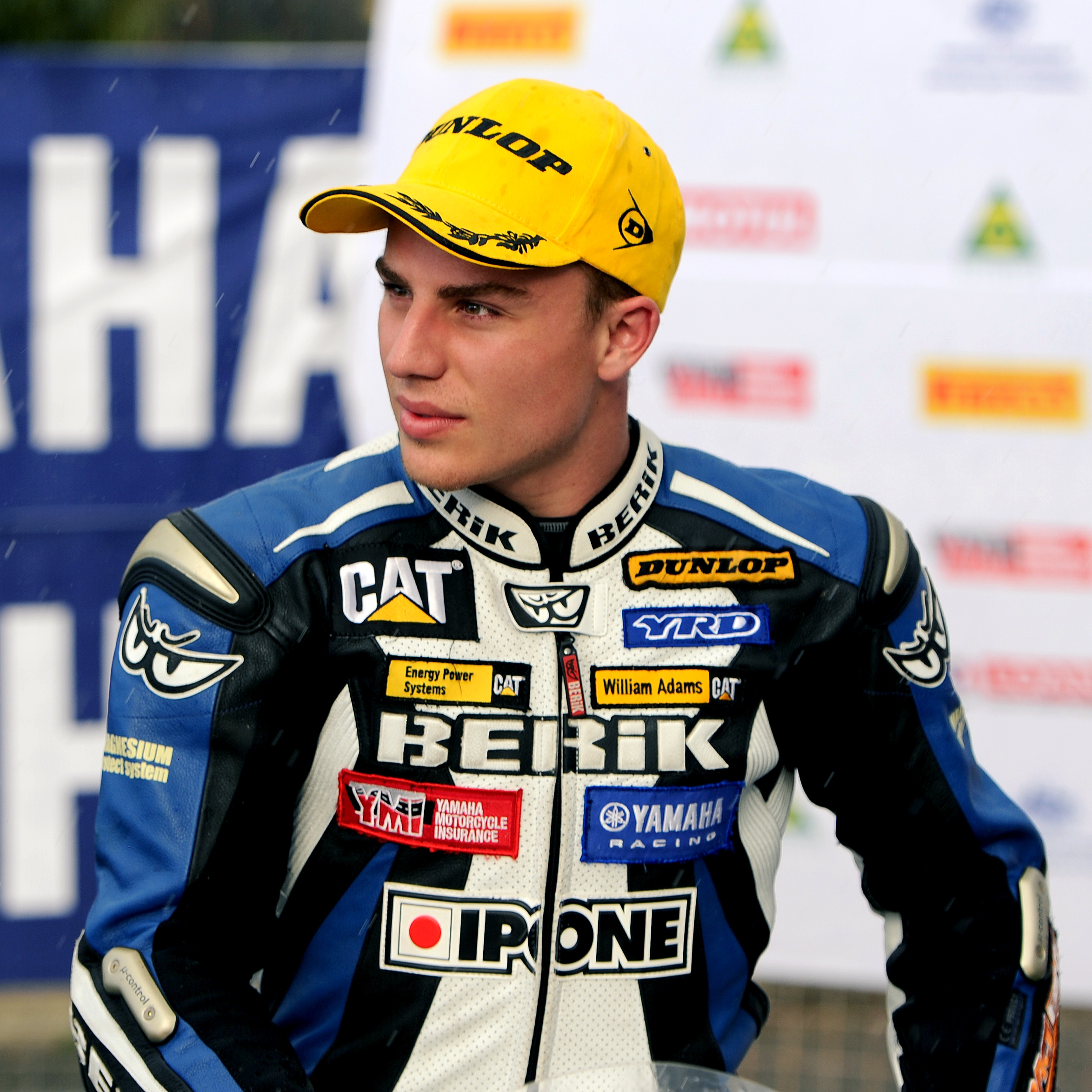
- Born: 16 March 1994 (age 32); Adelaide, South Australia, Australia
- Nationality: (Australia)
- Current team: Yamaha Racing Team
- Bike number: 25
- Website: www.jondanielsracing.com.au
Statistics
Australian Superbike Championship
Active years	2015
Championships	0
Manufacturer	Yamaha
Last season (2015)	2nd (163 pts)
Starts / Wins / Podiums / Poles / F. laps / Points; 10 / 0 / 5 / 0 / 1 / 163
Australian Supersport 600 Championship
Active years	2013-2014
Championships	2
Manufacturer	Yamaha
Last season (2014)	1st (3 wins/93 pts)
Starts / Wins / Podiums / Poles / F. laps / Points; 16 / 7 / 13 / 6 / 3 / 340

Daniel Falzon (born 16 March 1994) is a professional motorcycle racer from Adelaide, Australia. He competes in the Australian Superbike Championship, aboard a Yamaha YZF-R1. He is the 2013 and 2014 Australian Supersport Champion, and the 2012 Australian Superstock 600 Champion.

In 2012, Falzon won the ASBK Superstock championship by 72.5 points and secured the lap record at three of the four tracks visited. The same year, he was also a contestant on the One HD TV program, The Ultimate Rider. In 2013, he moved up to the highly contested Supersport category with hopes of finishing in the top-five. As the rookie in the class, he surprised everyone by leading every round and eventually winning the Supersport Championship, becoming one of the youngest riders to have ever done so.

In 2014, Falzon competed in the Australian Superbike Championship in the Supersport class which he won to become the first person to win the Australian Supersport Championship back to back. In addition, he competed in the high exposure Phillip Island Championship which is run in conjunction with the Australian rounds of the World Superbike (WSBK) and MotoGP Championships. At the Australian round of the MotoGP Championship, he won all three races to secure his fifth national title in six years.

== Motorcycle Racing results ==
Year	Championship / Class	Level	Grade	Motorcycle	Team	Race	Win	Podium	Pole	F/Lap	Points	Placed
2008	MRRDA - CBR150	National	Junior	Honda CBR150	Jon Daniels Racing	15	0	0	0	0	153	7th
2009	MRRDA - Junior 4-Stroke	National	Junior	Honda CBR150	Jon Daniels Racing	15	3	8	0	4	289	1st
2009	Hartwell - 125GP	State	Outright	Honda RS125	Jon Daniels Racing	15	N/A	N/A	N/A	N/A	259	1st
2010	AFXC Nationals - FX600	National	Outright	Honda CBR600RR	Jon Daniels Racing	15	0	2	0	0	204	4th
2010	AFXC Championship - FX600	National	Outright	Honda CBR600RR	Jon Daniels Racing	15	0	0	0	0	197	5th
2011	ASBK - Superstock 600	National	Outright	Yamaha YZF-R6	Jon Daniels Racing	14	2	8	0	0	266	2nd
2012	Cafe Racer Club Series	State	Outright	Yamaha YZF-R6	Jon Daniels Racing	9	6	8	6	6	194	1st
2012	ASBK - Superstock 600	National	Outright	Yamaha YZF-R6	Caterpillar / Jon Daniels Racing	14	10	13	14	8	305	1st
2013	ASBK - Supersport 600	National	Outright	Yamaha YZF-R6	Caterpillar / Jon Daniels Racing	12	4	9	4	3	247	1st
2014	P.I. Championship - Supersport 600	National	Outright	Yamaha YZF-R6	Caterpillar / Jon Daniels Racing	5	4	5	5	3	117	1st
2014	ASC - Supersport 600	National	Outright	Yamaha YZF-R6	Caterpillar / Jon Daniels Racing	8	3	5	5	4	190^{†}	2nd^{†}
2014	ASBK - Supersport 600	National	Outright	Yamaha YZF-R6	Caterpillar / Jon Daniels Racing	4	3	3	2	3	93	1st
2015	ASBK - Superbike 1000	National	Outright	Yamaha YZF-R1	Caterpillar / Jon Daniels Racing	10	0	5	0	1	163	2nd
Total						151	35	66	36	32	2677	

^{†}Result at the point at which the championship was abandoned

Asterisk (*) symbol denotes a season that is still in progress

== Notable Achievements ==
2008- Collingrove Hillclimb Junior - 1st Place
2009- Collingrove Hillclimb Junior - 1st Place
2009- George Carrick Open Championship - 2nd Place
2009- Phillip Island 6Hr Endurance Race (Superstock 600) - 1st Place
2011- Nominated as South Australian Male Youth Athlete of the Year
2012- Was one of 7 contestants on the Channel One HD reality TV series, The Ultimate Rider.
2013- Finalist for South Australian Athlete of the Year.

== Current Lap Records ==
Daniel holds official lap records at the following tracks in the listed classes.
Hidden Valley Raceway - Superstock 600 - 1:11.891
Queensland Raceway - Superstock 600 - 1:12.833
Mallala Motor Sport Park - Superstock 600 - 1:09.791
Hidden Valley Raceway - Supersport 600 - 1:09.458
Barbagallo Raceway - Superbike 1000 - 55.446
Mallala Motor Sport Park - Superbike 1000 - 1:05.767

== TV Appearance ==
In October 2012, Falzon was selected as one of seven contestants to take part in the first season of a new reality TV series called, The Ultimate Rider. The show is based around several challenges which each rider completes and scores points for in the hope to win the prize of A$20,000 and a contract with Honda Factory Racing. The program was broadcast on Channel One HD in October 2012 and repeated in March 2013.

== Moto2 Replacement Ride ==
In October 2013, the Jon Daniels Racing Team were contacted by the Technomag-CarXpert Moto2 Team to have Falzon replace injured rider, Randy Krummenacher in the Australian round of the 2013 MotoGP Championship. Although the offer was accepted, the opportunity was lost when the Moto2 bike was damaged beyond repair in a large accident during the Malaysian MotoGP race just one week prior to the Australian round.

== Seasons in Detail ==
(Motorsport Table Legend)

=== 2008 ===
Championship	Class	Bike	Season Results (Position)															Pos	Pts
MRRDA	150 Junior Outright	Honda CBR150R	Oran Park Raceway			Broadford Motorsport Park			Morgan Park (Warwick)			Wakefield Park			Phillip Island				
MRRDA	150 Junior Outright	Honda CBR150R	14	13	14	16	8	13	9	11	9	7	7	5	6	8	Ret	7th	153

=== 2009 ===
Championship	Class	Bike	Season Results (Position)															Pos	Pts
MRRDA	Junior 4-Stroke Outright	Honda CBR150R	Oran Park Raceway			Broadford Motorsport Park			Mac Park			Morgan Park (Warwick)			Phillip Island				
MRRDA	Junior 4-Stroke Outright	Honda CBR150R	1	1	2	4	2	4	2	4	2	4	6	6	1	5	2	1st	289

=== 2010 ===
Championship	Class	Bike	Season Results (Position)															Pos	Pts
Australian Formula Xtreme Nationals	FX600	Honda CBR600RR	Wakefield Park Raceway			Winton Motorsport Park			Eastern Creek Raceway			Wakefield Park Raceway			Eastern Creek Raceway				
Australian Formula Xtreme Nationals	FX600	Honda CBR600RR	4	3	3	4	5	5	13	14	10	7	9	7	6	8	DNS	4th	204

Championship	Class	Bike	Season Results (Position)															Pos	Pts
Australian Formula Xtreme Championship	FX600	Honda CBR600RR	Wakefield Park Raceway			Winton Motorsport Park			Eastern Creek Raceway			Wakefield Park Raceway			Eastern Creek Raceway				
Australian Formula Xtreme Championship	FX600	Honda CBR600RR	4	5	5	4	4	4	13	26	12	4	4	7	5	11	22	5th	197

=== 2011 ===
Championship	Class	Bike	Season Results (Position)														Pos	Pts
Australian Superbike Championship	Superstock 600	Yamaha YZF-R6	Phillip Island		Symmonds Plains			Hidden Valley			QLD Raceway			Phillip Island				
Australian Superbike Championship	Superstock 600	Yamaha YZF-R6	4	6	5	7	4	2	2	4	2	2	2	1	2	1	2nd	266

=== 2012 ===
Championship	Class	Bike	Season Results (Position)														Pos	Pts
Australian Superbike Championship	Superstock 600	Yamaha YZF-R6	Phillip Island			Hidden Valley			QLD Raceway		Phillip Island			QLD Raceway				
Australian Superbike Championship	Superstock 600	Yamaha YZF-R6	1	2	1	1	1	1	2	1	1	1	Ret	2	1	1	1st	305

=== 2013 ===
Championship	Class	Bike	Season Results (Position)												Pos	Pts
Australian Superbike Championship	Supersport 600	Yamaha YZF-R6	Phillip Island		QLD Raceway		Sydney Motorsport Park		Sydney Motorsport Park		Hidden Valley		Phillip Island			
Australian Superbike Championship	Supersport 600	Yamaha YZF-R6	3	1	4	2	1	4	3	4	1	1	2	3	1st	247

=== 2014 ===
Championship	Class	Bike	Season Results (Position)					Pos	Pts
Phillip Island Championship	Supersport 600	Yamaha YZF-R6	Phillip Island (WSBK)		Phillip Island (MotoGP)				
Phillip Island Championship	Supersport 600	Yamaha YZF-R6	1	2	1	1	1	1st	117

Championship	Class	Bike	Season Results (Position)					Pos	Pts
Australian Superbike Championship	Supersport 600	Yamaha YZF-R6	QLD Raceway		Hidden Valley	Phillip Island			
Australian Superbike Championship	Supersport 600	Yamaha YZF-R6	1	1	Cancelled	1	4	1st	93

Championship	Class	Bike	Season Results (Position)												Pos	Pts
Australasian Superbike Championship	Supersport 600	Yamaha YZF-R6	Wakefield Park			Mallala Raceway			QLD Raceway			Winton	Wakefield Park	Sydney Motorsport Park		
Australasian Superbike Championship	Supersport 600	Yamaha YZF-R6	5	2	4	7	3	-	1	1	1	Did not compete in final 3 rounds			2nd^{†}	190^{†}

^{†}Results when championship was abandoned

=== 2015 ===
Championship	Class	Bike	Season Results (Position)										Pos	Pts
Australian Superbike Championship	Superbike 1000	Yamaha YZF-R1	Phillip Island GP Circuit		Morgan Park Raceway		Barbagallo Raceway		Symmonds Plains Raceway		Phillip Island GP Circuit			
Australian Superbike Championship	Superbike 1000	Yamaha YZF-R1	4	8	2	2	2	2	2	Ret	4	4	2nd	163

Asterisk (*) symbol denotes a season that is still in progress
