= George R. Sims (New Port Richey) =

George R Sims (1876 - 1954) was the founder of New Port Richey, Florida and the donor of the land for Sims Park, originally known as Enchantment Park. A waymarker commemorates the gift.

Sims moved to New Port Richey in 1922 from Great Neck, New York. He purchased property during the 1925-26 land boom.

Sims' wife Marjorie earned the first Chasco Fiesta Queen title in 1922 at the first of the annual incarnation of the fundraising event linked to a legend honoring Native Americans who once inhabited the area.
