= James Miller (cricketer) =

English cricketer

James Nicholas Miller (born 18 September 1976) is an English cricketer. He was a right-handed batsman who played for Northumberland in List A and Minor Counties cricket. He was born in North Shields.

Miller made a single List A appearance for Northumberland in the C&G Trophy against Staffordshire.

His last Minor Counties appearance for Northumberland was in 2006.
