= Jimmy Miller (footballer, born 1889) =

English footballer (1889–1957)

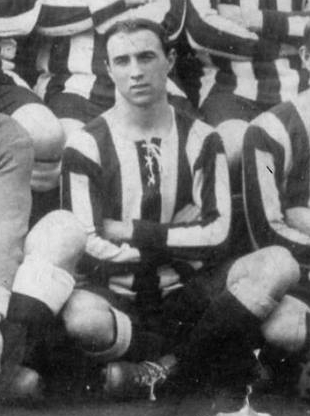
- Miller while with Newcastle United in 1912.

Personal information
- Full name: James Miller
- Date of birth: 10 May 1889
- Place of birth: Tynemouth, England
- Date of death: 27 December 1957 (aged 68)
- Place of death: North Shields, England
- Height: 5 ft 7 in (1.70 m)
- Position: Winger

Senior career*
| Years | Team | Apps | (Gls) |
| 1910–1911 | South Shields Albion | | |
| 1911–1912 | Wallsend Park Villa | | |
| 1912–1913 | Newcastle United | 0 | (0) |
| 1913–1919 | Grimsby Town | 6 | (1) |
| 1919 | Everton | 8 | (1) |
| 1919 | Coventry City | 7 | (0) |
| 1919–1920 | Preston North End | 15 | (1) |
| 1920–1921 | Pontypridd | | |
| 1921–1922 | Darlington | 0 | (0) |
| 1922–1923 | Chesterfield | 32 | (1) |
| 1923–1924 | Boscombe | 38 | (0) |
| 1924–1925 | Swansea Town | 25 | (1) |
| 1925–1926 | Luton Town | 10 | (3) |
- * Club domestic league appearances and goals

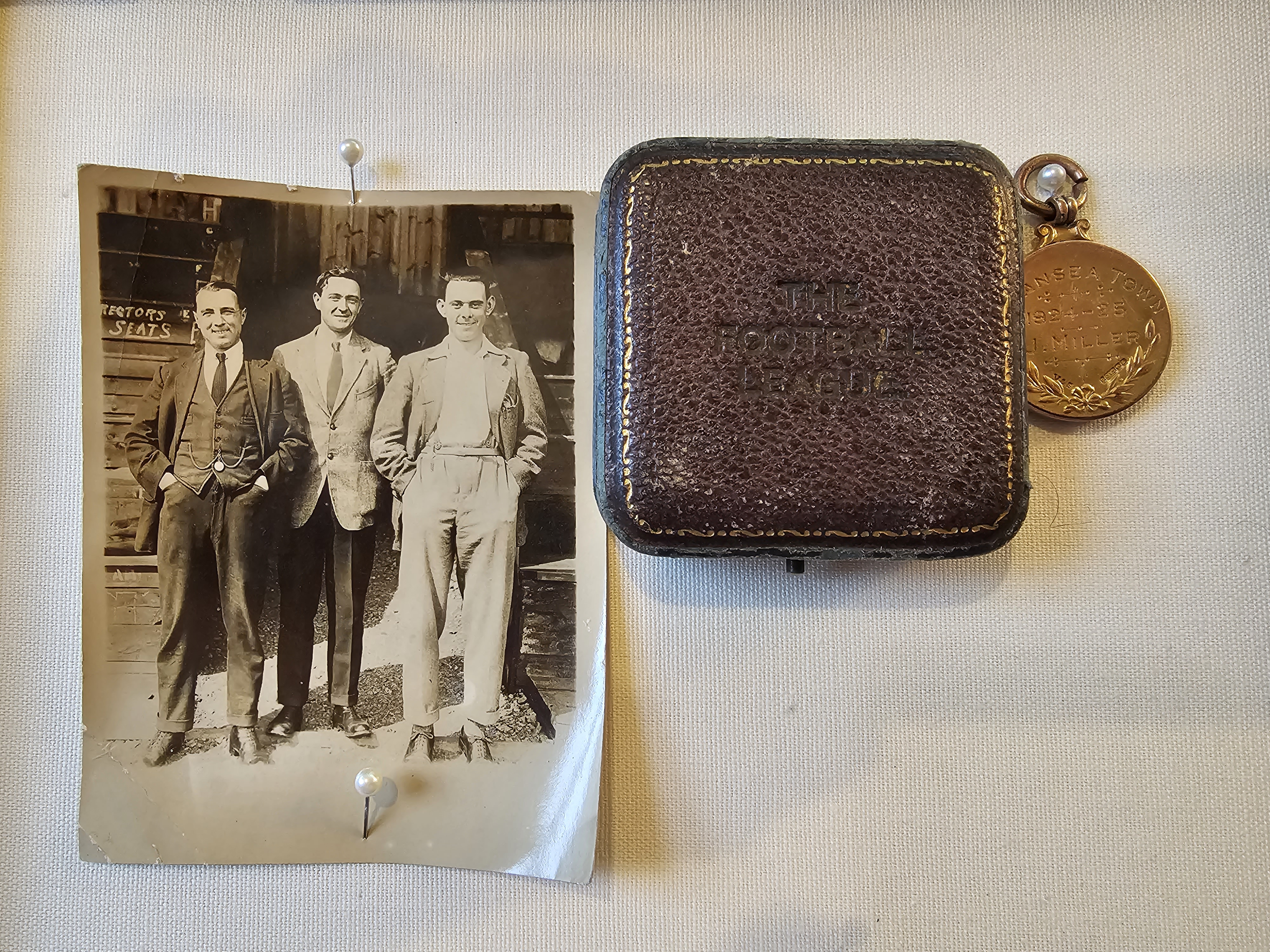
Miller shown on left with Medal attached to watch chain.

James Miller (10 May 1889 – 27 December 1957) was an English professional footballer who played as an outside right in the Football League for a number of clubs.

== Personal life ==
Miller served in the Tyne Electrical Engineers during the First World War.

== Career statistics ==
Appearances and goals by club, season and competition
| Club | Season | League | | | National Cup | | Total | |
| Club | Season | Division | Apps | Goals | Apps | Goals | Apps | Goals |
|---|---|---|---|---|---|---|---|---|
| Everton | 1919–20 | First Division | 8 | 1 | 0 | 0 | 8 | 1 |
| Coventry City | 1919–20 | Second Division | 7 | 1 | 0 | 0 | 7 | 1 |
| Chesterfield | 1922–23 | Third Division North | 32 | 1 | 4 | 0 | 36 | 1 |
| Luton Town | 1925–26 | Third Division South | 10 | 3 | 1 | 0 | 11 | 3 |
| Career total | | | 57 | 6 | 5 | 0 | 62 | 6 |

== Honours ==
Swansea Town

- Football League Third Division South: 1924–25
