= James Miller (1910s footballer) =

Scottish footballer

Personal information
- Place of birth: Glasgow, Scotland
- Position: Right half

Senior career*
Years	Team	Apps	(Gls)
–	Maryhill		
1912–1914	Sheffield Wednesday	30	(0)
1914–1920	Airdrieonians	89	(2)
1920–1921	→ St Bernard's (loan)		
1921–1922	St Mirren	19	(0)
Total		138	(2)
- * Club domestic league appearances and goals

James Miller was a Scottish footballer who played as a right half, mainly for Sheffield Wednesday, Airdrieonians and St Mirren.
