= Australian Superbike Championship =

Australian motorcycle racing competition

- ASBK current Logo
- Category: Superbike racing
- Country: Australia
- Inaugural season: 1980
- Riders' champion: Harrison Voight
- Official website: Australian Superbike Championship

The Australian Superbike Championship (ASBK) is a national motorcycle racing championship in Australia, organized by Motorcycling Australia.

== History ==
The story of the Australian Superbike Championship begins in 1980, at a time in motorcycle sport when the premier road racing series globally was the 500cc Grand Prix world championship. The issue with 500s at that time was that manufacturer teams were investing large amounts of funding to develop their machines and riders to a level of sophistication that was far removed from what was commercially available to the public. This resulted in a very expensive racing programme, especially for privateers.

The need for a road race series that offered ease of entry for national riders was evident – one that was open to all makes of production motorcycles, machines which required little modification and development from standard road going trim. Enter the Australian Superbike Series. Australia's flagship road race in 1980 through to 1986 was called the 'Australian Superbike Series', that featured large capacity production motorcycles which at the time, were some of the most competitive in the world 'out of the box'. Winning bikes were mostly Japanese manufactured inline four cylinder powered machines readily available for public purchase in Australia. The motorcycle manufacturers idiom of the day being "Race on Sunday, sell on Monday", a reference to motorcycle sales figures on the back of a particular marque's race win.

For two years, spanning 1987–1988, political and economic influences saw the renaming of the Series to 'The Australian Endurance Championship'. Again, the Endurance Championship was the premier road racing competition in the country, which in 1989 once again morphed, into what was called, the 'Australian Superbike Championship' run under the Australian Road Race Championship banner.

Over the years the Championship has been run by Motorcycling Australia (MA) in conjunction with private promoters and clubs. And it proved to be a successful formula with success at its peak in the 1990s to early 2000s, however further economic challenges hit the series hard. With struggling competitor numbers, spectators and media exposure, MA opted to step in as the primary promoter, rekindling the championship as the Australian Superbike Championship or 'ASBK'.

Over the following years, the ASBK has seen growth and an increased talent pool, with the Championship forming a springboard for riders and teams to seek opportunities abroad and on international podiums.

The ASBK includes a variety of motorcycle classes for different riders and abilities, from the Australian GP Juniors Cup, which is based purely on a single-make 150cc production bike for riders aged between 12 and under 16 years, to the Australian Superbike category, which features large-capacity motorcycles available on the domestic market. The MA Championship provides opportunities for riders to develop their race craft and progress from junior programs to the Superbike class.

== Champions ==
Src:

Season	Champion	Bike
Australian Superbike Series
1980	Andrew Johnson	Kawasaki Z1000 Mk.II
1981	Rob Phillis	Suzuki GSX1100
1982	Rob Phillis	Suzuki GSX1100
1983	Rob Phillis	Suzuki GSX1100
1984	Rob Phillis	Suzuki GSX1100
1985	Rob Phillis	Suzuki GSX1100
1986	Malcolm Campbell	Honda VFR750
Australian Endurance Championship
1987	Tony Armstrong	Suzuki GSX-R750
1988	Rob Phillis	Kawasaki GPX750R
Australian Superbike Championship
1989	Malcolm Campbell	Honda RC30
1990	Malcolm Campbell	Honda RC30
1991	(New Zealand) Aaron Slight	Kawasaki ZXR750R
1992	Mat Mladin	Kawasaki ZXR750R
1993	Troy Corser	Honda RC30
1994	Anthony Gobert	Honda RC45
1995	Kirk McCarthy	Honda RC45
1996	Peter Goddard	Suzuki GSX-R750
1997	Martin Craggill	Kawasaki ZX-7RR
1998	Martin Craggill	Kawasaki ZX-7RR
1999	Steve Martin	Ducati 996RS
2000	Shawn Giles	Suzuki GSX-R750
2001	Shawn Giles	Suzuki GSX-R1000
2002	Shawn Giles	Suzuki GSX-R1000
2003	Craig Coxhell	Suzuki GSX-R1000
2004	Adam Fergusson	Honda CBR1000RR
2005	Josh Brookes	Honda CBR1000RR
2006	Jamie Stauffer	Yamaha YZF-R1
2007	Jamie Stauffer	Yamaha YZF-R1
2008	Glenn Allerton	Honda CBR1000RR
2009	Josh Waters	Suzuki GSX-R1000
2010	Bryan Staring	Honda CBR1000RR
2011	Glenn Allerton	BMW S1000RR
2012	Josh Waters	Suzuki GSX-R1000
2013	Wayne Maxwell	Suzuki GSX-R1000
2014	Glenn Allerton	BMW S1000RR
2015	Mike Jones	Kawasaki ZX-10R
2016	Troy Herfoss	Honda CBR1000RR SP
2017	Josh Waters	Suzuki GSX-R1000R
2018	Troy Herfoss	Honda CBR1000RR SP
2019	Mike Jones	Ducati 1299 Panigale R Final Edition
2020	Wayne Maxwell	Ducati Panigale V4R
2021	Wayne Maxwell	Ducati Panigale V4R
2022	Mike Jones	Yamaha YZF-R1
2023	Troy Herfoss	Honda CBR1000RR-R
2024	Josh Waters	Ducati Panigale V4R
2025	Josh Waters	Ducati Panigale V4R
2026	Harrison Voight	Ducati Panigale V4R

== See also ==
- Australian FX-Superbike Championship
