= Jim Miller (athletic director) =

American athletic director

Playing career

Basketball
- 1970–1974: Old Dominion

Baseball
- 1972: Old Dominion

Coaching career (HC unless noted)

Basketball
- 1979–1982: VMI (assistant)

Administrative career (AD unless noted)
- 1990–2000: NC State (associate AD)
- 2000–2012: Richmond
- 2021–2024: VMI

Jim Miller is an American former college athletic administrator. He served as the athletic director at the University of Richmond from 2000 to 2012 and the Virginia Military Institute (VMI) from 2021 to 2024. Prior to moving to Richmond, Miller was the executive associate director of athletics at North Carolina State University. Miller joined the NC State athletic program in 1990 as compliance officer and overseeing public relations and marketing. In 1999, a restructuring within the NC State athletic department resulted in athletic director Les Robinson taking responsibility for fundraising and promotion, while Miller became responsible for overseeing the day-to-day activities of the athletic department.

In college, Miller played basketball and baseball at Old Dominion University. He holds a master's degree in education from Old Dominion and a Juris Doctor degree from the College of William & Mary law school.
