= Australian FX-Superbike Championship =

- Category: Superbike racing
- Country: Australia
- Inaugural season: 2009
- Riders' champion: (Australia) Brad Swallow
- Official website: http://www.fxsuperbikes.com.au/

The Australian FX-Superbike Championship is a professional motorcycle road-racing series in Australia. Organised by Australian Road and Track Rider Promotions, the championship, run for Superbike class racing motorcycles, has been run each year since 2009. Originally known as the Formula Xtreme Tri-State Series, it originally formed as a breakaway series from the Australian Superbike Championship. The 2009 series was run over three events. The 2010 series was ramped up to a five-round series and was rebranded as the Australian FX-Superbike Championship with it expanding further to six rounds in 2011.

Merger talks with the Motorcycling Australia during 2011 fell apart. YMF Loan, the financial arm of Yamaha motorcycles in Australia, sponsored the series from 2010 to 2013.

At the end of the 2013 season, a one-off non-championship race was held at Sydney Motorsport Park under the name Australasian Superbike Championship, reviving a name used in the past in Australia road racing. The 2014 championship was rebranded under this banner with sponsor support from specialist motorcycle insurance company Swann Insurance, with the aim of attracting teams from New Zealand and further afield in the Asian region. Due to the competitor series' inferior popularity, just two rounds of the Australian Superbike Championship were held in 2013.

Kevin Curtain dominated the early series. Riding for the Australian Yamaha Racing Team, he won three titles in a row from 2010 to 2012 and was runner up to teammate Broc Parkes in 2013.

In 2017, the series returned to its earlier name, the Australian FX-Superbike Championship, dropping its 'Australasian' identity.

== Champions ==
Season	Champion	Bike	Source
Formula Xtreme Tri-State Series
2009	Craig McMartin	Ducati 1198 S	
Australian FX-Superbike Championship
2010	Kevin Curtain	Yamaha YZF-R1	
2011	Kevin Curtain	Yamaha YZF-R1	
2012	Kevin Curtain	Yamaha YZF-R1	
2013	Broc Parkes	Yamaha YZF-R1	
Australasian Superbike Championship
2013	Matthew Walters	Kawasaki Ninja ZX-10R	
2014	Wayne Maxwell	Honda CBR1000RR	
2015	Troy Herfoss	Honda CBR1000RR SP	
2016	Robbie Bugden	Kawasaki Ninja ZX-10R	
Australian FX-Superbike Championship
2017	Brad Swallow	Kawasaki Ninja ZX-10R	
