= Wayne Maxwell =

Australian motorcycle racer

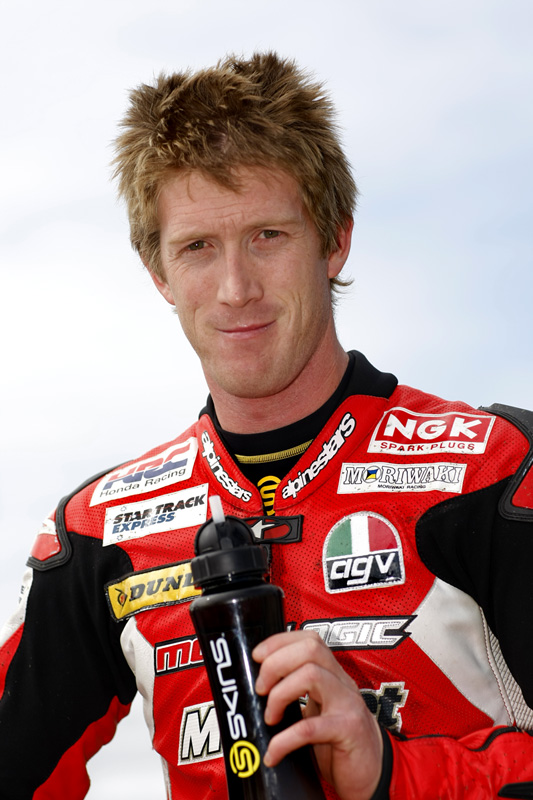
- Maxwell in 2009
- Nationality: Australia
- Born: 18 October 1982 (age 44); Wollongong, Australia
- Current team: Yamaha Racing Team
- Bike number: 47
Motorcycle racing career statistics
Moto2 World Championship
| Active years | 2010 |
| Manufacturers | Moriwaki |
Starts / Wins / Podiums / Poles / F. laps / Points; 1 / 0 / 0 / 0 / 0 / 0
Superbike World Championship
| Active years | 2018 |
| Manufacturers | Yamaha |
Starts / Wins / Podiums / Poles / F. laps / Points; 1 / 0 / 0 / 0 / 0 / 0

Wayne Colin Maxwell (born 18 October 1982) is an Australian retired professional motorcycle racer. He was the Australian Superbike champion in 2013, 2020, 2021, and the Australasian Superbike. He raced in the Australasian Superbike Championship aboard a Yamaha YZF-R1.

Maxwell contested one round of the 2010 Moto2 season at Phillip Island, where he was disqualified from the race following a physical altercation with Héctor Faubel.

== Career statistics ==
=== Grand Prix motorcycle racing ===
==== By season ====
| Season | Class | Motorcycle | Team | Race | Win | Podium | Pole | FLap | Pts | Plcd |
|---|---|---|---|---|---|---|---|---|---|---|
| 2010 | Moto2 | Moriwaki | Matteoni Racing | 1 | 0 | 0 | 0 | 0 | 0 | NC |
| Total | | | | **1** | **0** | **0** | **0** | **0** | **0** | |

==== Races by year ====
| Year | Class | Bike | 1 | 2 | 3 | 4 | 5 | 6 | 7 | 8 | 9 | 10 | 11 | 12 | 13 | 14 | 15 | 16 | 17 | Pos. | Pts. |
|---|---|---|---|---|---|---|---|---|---|---|---|---|---|---|---|---|---|---|---|---|---|
| 2010 | Moto2 | Moriwaki | QAT | SPA | FRA | ITA | GBR | NED | CAT | GER | CZE | INP | RSM | ARA | JPN | MAL | AUS; DSQ | POR | VAL | NC | 0 |

=== Superbike World Championship ===
==== Races by year ====
| Year | Bike | 1 | | 2 | | 3 | | 4 | | 5 | | 6 | | 7 | | 8 | | 9 | | 10 | | 11 | | 12 | | 13 | | Pos. | Pts. |
| Year | Bike | R1 | R2 | R1 | R2 | R1 | R2 | R1 | R2 | R1 | R2 | R1 | R2 | R1 | R2 | R1 | R2 | R1 | R2 | R1 | R2 | R1 | R2 | R1 | R2 | R1 | R2 | Pos. | Pts. |
|---|---|---|---|---|---|---|---|---|---|---|---|---|---|---|---|---|---|---|---|---|---|---|---|---|---|---|---|---|---|
| 2018 | Yamaha | AUS; Ret | AUS; DNS | THA | THA | SPA | SPA | NED | NED | ITA | ITA | GBR | GBR | CZE | CZE | USA | USA | ITA | ITA | POR | POR | FRA | FRA | ARG | ARG | QAT | QAT | NC | 0 |

=== FIM Endurance World Championship ===
==== By team ====
| Year | Team | Bike | Rider | TC |
|---|---|---|---|---|
| 2014 | Yamaha Austria Racing Team | Yamaha YZF-R1 | (Australia) Broc Parkes (United Kingdom) Michael Laverty (Slovenia) Igor Jerman (South Africa) Sheridan Morais (Australia) Ricky Olson (Australia) Wayne Maxwell (United Kingdom) Tommy Bridewell | 6th |

=== Australian Superbike Championship ===
==== Races by year ====
(key) (Races in bold indicate pole position; races in italics indicate fastest lap)

| Year | Bike | 1 | | 2 | | 3 | | 4 | | | 5 | | 6 | | | 7 | | Pos | Pts |
| Year | Bike | R1 | R2 | R1 | R2 | R1 | R2 | R1 | R2 | R3 | R1 | R2 | R1 | R2 | R3 | R1 | R2 | Pos | Pts |
|---|---|---|---|---|---|---|---|---|---|---|---|---|---|---|---|---|---|---|---|
| 2022 | Ducati | PHI; Ret**^{1}** | PHI; 1 | QUE; 2 | QUE; 3 | WAK; 2 | WAK; 1 | HID; 4**^{1}** | HID; 1 | HID; 11 | MOR; 1**^{1}** | MOR; 1 | PHI; Ret | PHI; 1 | PHI; Ret | BEN; 2 | BEN; 3 | 2nd | 276 |
