= George Sims (educator) =

English educator

George Francis Sims (1888–1943) was a working class educator who was one of the founders of the National Council of Labour Colleges.

George started working at the age of eight, however as one of his duties as a page was reading The Times to his employer he developed a thirst for learning.

In 1909, Sims was one of the students at Ruskin College who had set up an independent study circle which sought to collectively read Karl Marx's Das Kapital.

Sims served in the British Army from 1914 to 1919. He ended his service as a battery sergeant major in the Motor Machine Gun Corps.
