= James Gegan Miller =

Jim Miller
- Born: 1942 (age 83–84); St. Louis, Missouri
- Education: Saint Louis University; Washington University in St. Louis
- Awards: National Institutes of Health MERIT Award; Rayleigh Award, IEEE Ultrasonics, Ferroelectrics, and Frequency Control Society; Joseph H. Holmes Basic Science Pioneer Award, American Institute of Ultrasound in Medicine; Silver medal, Acoustical Society of America
- Scientific career
- Fields: Biophysics; Echocardiography; Ultrasonics
- Workplaces: Washington University in St. Louis
- Doctoral advisor: Daniel Isadore Bolef
- Notable students: William E. Moerner

James Gegan Miller is an American physicist, engineer, and inventor whose primary interests center around biomedical physics. He is currently a professor of physics, Medicine, and Biomedical Engineering, emeritus, at Washington University in St. Louis, where he holds the Albert Gordon Hill Endowed Chair in the Faculty of Arts and Sciences. He is notable for his interdisciplinary contributions to biomedical physics, echocardiography, and ultrasonics.

== Biography ==
Miller grew up in St. Louis, Missouri, and received his bachelor's degree in physics, summa cum laude, from Saint Louis University in 1964. He went on to receive master's and doctoral degrees from Washington University in St. Louis in 1966 and 1969, respectively. His doctoral advisor was Daniel Isadore Bolef.

Thereafter he was hired as assistant professor of physics and earned tenure 2 years later, in 1970. He is now Albert Gordon Hill Chair of the Faculty of Arts and Sciences and Director of the Laboratory of Ultrasonics.

== Teaching ==
For about four decades, Miller taught a course titled "Physics of the Heart" at Washington University. He won the college's Faculty Teaching Award in 1989 and the Emerson Teaching Award in 2004. Over the course of his career, he mentored 35 graduate students and numerous undergraduates, including Nobel Laureate in Chemistry William E. Moerner.

== Research ==
Miller has published more than 165 refereed journal articles and 110 conference proceedings and book chapters. His work has contributed greatly to ultrasonics, myocardial tissue characterization and has been incorporated into echocardiography devices in use throughout the world.

== Awards ==
- IR-100 award for Ultrasonic Microemboli Monitor, 1974 (now called R&D 100 awards)
- IR-100 Award: Acoustoelectric Receiving Transducer, 1978
- Sigma Xi National Speaker, 1981-1982
- Fellow of the American Institute of Ultrasound in Medicine, 1986
- Fellow of the Acoustical Society of America, 1990
- Fellow of the Institute of Electrical and Electronics Engineers, 1998
- National Institutes of Health MERIT Award, 1998
- Silver medal (in Biomedical Ultrasound/Bioresponse to Vibration), Acoustical Society of America, 2004
- Emerson Excellence in Teaching Award, Washington University, 2004
- Achievement Award, IEEE Ultrasonics, Ferroelectrics, and Frequency Control Society, 2006
- Joseph H. Holmes Basic Science Pioneer Award, American Institute of Ultrasound in Medicine, 2014
- Rayleigh Award, IEEE UFFC, 2016
