= Ozaki =

Ozaki (written: 尾崎 or 小崎) is a Japanese surname. Notable people with the surname include:

- Amii Ozaki (尾崎 亜美; born 1957), Japanese singer-songwriter
- Eiichiro Ozaki (尾崎 瑛一郎; born 1984), Japanese footballer
- Eijiro Ozaki (尾崎 英二郎), Japanese actor
- Ozaki Hōsai (尾崎 放哉; 1885–1926), Japanese poet
- Hiroya Ozaki (尾崎 裕哉; born 1989), Japanese singer-songwriter
- Hotsumi Ozaki (尾崎 秀実; 1901–1944), Japanese journalist
- Kazuo Ozaki (尾崎 加寿夫; born 1960), Japanese footballer
- Keiji Ozaki (尾崎 圭司; born 1980), Japanese taekwondo practitioner and kickboxer
- Ozaki Kihachi (尾崎 喜八; 1892–1974), Japanese poet
- Kuniko Ozaki (尾崎 久仁子; born 1956), Japanese judge
- Ozaki Kōyō (尾崎 紅葉; 1868–1903), Japanese writer
- Maika Ozaki (尾崎 真衣加; born 1984), Japanese tennis player
- Maika Ozaki (尾崎妹加; born 1991), Japanese professional wrestler
- Mari Ozaki (小崎 まり; born 1975), Japanese long-distance runner
- Masanao Ozaki (尾崎 正直; born 1967), Japanese politician
- Masashi Ozaki (尾崎 将司; 1947–2025), Japanese golfer
- Masaya Ozaki (尾崎 匡哉; born 1984), Japanese baseball player
- Mayumi Ozaki (尾崎 魔弓; born 1968), Japanese professional wrestler
- Michiharu Ozaki (尾崎 道治; born 1953), Japanese sport shooter
- Milton K. Ozaki (1913–1989), American writer
- Minami Ozaki (尾崎 南; born 1968), Japanese manga artist
- Mineho Ozaki (尾崎 峰穂), Japanese Paralympic athlete
- Motojirō Ozaki (尾崎 元次郎; 1870–1945), Japanese politician and businessman
- Nana Ozaki (尾崎 ナナ), Japanese gravure idol
- Nana Ozaki (actress) (尾崎 奈々; born 1948), Japanese actress
- Naomichi Ozaki (尾崎 直道; born 1956), Japanese golfer
- Otokichi Ozaki (尾崎 音吉; 1904-1983), Japanese poet
- Risa Ozaki (尾﨑 里紗; born 1994), Japanese tennis player
- Sankichi Ozaki (尾崎 三吉; 1912–1994), Japanese photographer
- Saori Ozaki (尾崎 沙織; born 1996), Japanese badminton player
- Sayoko Ozaki (尾崎 紗代子; born 1989), Japanese model
- Takashi Ozaki (尾崎 隆; 1952–2011), Japanese mountain climber
- Tateo Ozaki (尾崎 健夫; born 1954), Japanese golfer
- Yoshimi Ozaki (尾崎 好美; born 1981), Japanese long-distance runner
- Yuji Ozaki (尾崎 雄二; born 1985), Japanese footballer
- Yuka Ozaki (尾崎 由香; born 1993), Japanese voice actress and actress
- Yukihiro Ozaki (尾崎 幸洋; born 1949), Japanese scientist
- Yukio Ozaki (尾崎 行雄; 1859–1954), Japanese politician
- Yukio Ozaki (artist) (born 1948) Japanese-born American visual artist
- Yushi Ozaki (尾崎 勇史; born 1969), Japanese footballer
- Yutaka Ozaki (尾崎 豊; 1965–1992), Japanese musician
- Yuuki Ozaki (尾崎 雄貴; born 1991), Japanese musician
