= Barry Smith =

Barry Smith may refer to:

== In sports ==
- Barry Smith (footballer, born 1934) (1934–2007), English footballer (Bradford Park Avenue, Wrexham, Stockport)
- Barry Smith (footballer, born 1953), English football goalkeeper (Colchester)
- Barry Smith (footballer, born 1974), Scottish football player and manager (Dundee FC, Alloa Athletic)
- Barry Smith (ice hockey, born 1955) (1955–2013), former NHL player for the Boston Bruins and the Colorado Rockies
- Barry Smith (ice hockey, born 1952), American ice hockey coach
- Barry Smith (American football) (born 1951), former NFL player for the Green Bay Packers
- Barry Smith (runner) (born 1953), British long-distance runner
- Barry Smith (motorcyclist) (born 1940), Australian motorcycle racer
- Barry Smith (Australian footballer) (born 1939), Australian rules footballer for Footscray

== Other ==
- Barry Smith (ontologist) (born 1952), ontologist at the State University of New York at Buffalo
- Barry Smith (preacher) (1933–2002), preacher from New Zealand
- Barry Smith (organist) (born 1939), South African organist, orchestral and choral conductor
- Barry C. Smith, senior lecturer in philosophy at Birkbeck College, University of London
- Barry Smith, former member of the band Add N to (X)

== See also ==
- Barry Windsor-Smith (born 1949), comics artist
- Barry Smyth (born 1973), Irish former head chef and restaurant owner
- Barry Smyth (academic), computer scientist
- Jason Barry-Smith (born 1969), Australian operatic baritone and vocal coach
