= Millar =

Millar is a surname. It may refer to:

== People ==
- Alan Millar (born 1947), Scottish philosopher
- Alex Millar (born 1985), British poker player
- Andrew Millar (disambiguation)
- Bill Millar (born 1950), Scottish-born Canadian soccer player
- Billy Millar (footballer, born 1906), Irish footballer
- Billy Millar (footballer, born 1924) (1924–1995), Scottish footballer
- Blair Millar (born 1956), Scottish footballer
- Brian Millar (born 1966), Irish cricketer
- Charles Vance Millar (1853–1926), Canadian lawyer and financier
- Chris Millar (born 1983), Scottish footballer
- Clarrie Millar (1925–2017), Australian politician
- Craig Millar (ice hockey) (born 1977), Canadian hockey player
- Darren Millar (born 1976), Welsh politician
- Dave Millar (born 1945), Scottish footballer
- David Millar (born 1977), Scottish road racing cyclist
- Derek Millar (born 1962), Burmese musician
- Duncan Millar (VC) (1824–1881), Scottish recipient of the Victoria Cross
- Fergus Millar (1935–2019), British historian
- Fiona Millar (born 1958), British journalist and education campaigner
- Frederick Millar, 1st Baron Inchyra (1900–1989), British diplomat
- Gavin Millar (1938–2022), Scottish film director
- Geoff Millar (born 1955), Australian cricketer
- Gertie Millar (1879–1952), English singer and actress
- George Millar (footballer) (born 1874), Scottish footballer
- George Millar (singer) (born 1947), Irish singer-songwriter, of The Irish Rovers

- Ian Millar, Joe Millar, Will Millar also of The Irish Rovers

- George Millar (writer) (1910–2005), Scottish journalist, World War II soldier and writer
- H. R. Millar (1869–1940), Scottish graphic artist and illustrator
- Huntly D. Millar (1927–2016), Canadian-born American founder of Millar Instruments
- Ian Millar (born 1947), Canadian show jumper
- James Millar (disambiguation)
- John Millar (disambiguation)
- Joseph Millar, American poet
- Judy Millar (born 1957), New Zealand artist
- Kevin Millar (born 1971), American baseball player
- Liam Millar (born 1999), Canadian soccer player
- Lisa Millar, Australian TV journalist and presenter
- Maggie Millar (born 1941) Australian actress
- Marc Millar (born 1969), Scottish footballer
- Margaret Millar (1915–1994), American-Canadian mystery and suspense writer
- Mark Millar (born 1969), Scottish comic book writer
- Mark Millar (footballer) (born 1988), Scottish footballer
- Mary Millar (1936–1998), English actress
- Martin Millar, Scottish author
- Matt Millar (born 1985), Australian (soccer) footballer
- Mike Millar (born 1965), Canadian hockey player
- Miles Millar (b 1970), British screenwriter and producer
- Norman S. Millar (1887–1938), Presbyterian minister in Brisbane, Australia
- Oliver Millar (1923–2007), British art historian
- Paul Millar (disambiguation)
- Peter Millar (disambiguation)
- Renton Millar (born 1975), Australian vertical skateboarder
- Robbie Millar (1967–2005), Northern Irish chef and restaurateur
- Robert Millar (disambiguation)
- Robin Millar (producer) (born 1951), English musician, songwriter, and record producer
- Rodrigo Millar (born 1981), Chilean footballer
- Ron Millar, video game designer
- Ryan Millar (born 1978), American volleyball player
- Sandy Millar (born 1939), English Anglican bishop
- Syd Millar (1934–2023), chairman of the International Rugby Board
- Thomas Millar (1925–1994), Australian historian and political scientist
- Will Millar (born 1940), Irish-Canadian singer with The Irish Rovers
- William Millar (disambiguation), several people
- Willie Millar (1901–1966), Scottish footballer

== Fictional characters ==
- Alex Millar (Being Human), a lead character in the British television series Being Human
- Kirsty Millar, from the British soap opera Doctors
- Martin Millar (Doctors), from the soap opera Doctors
- Ollie Millar, from the soap opera Doctors
- Rich Millar, from the soap opera Doctors

== See also ==
- Millar Addition, suburb of Prince George, British Columbia, Canada
