= Paul Miller =

Paul Miller may refer to:

== Art ==
- Paul Miller (actor) (born 1960), Canadian actor
- Paul Miller (TV director), television director
- Paul Miller (theatre director) (born c. 1968), artistic director of the Orange Tree Theatre
- Paul D. Miller, better known as DJ Spooky (born 1970), American hip-hop musician

== Politics and government ==
- Paul Miller (North Carolina politician), former Democratic member of the North Carolina General Assembly
- Paul Miller (Canadian politician) (born 1951), politician in Hamilton, Ontario
- Paul David Miller (born 1941), admiral in the United States Navy
- Paul D. Miller (academic), American academic, blogger, and U.S. government official
- Paul W. Miller (1899–1976), Pennsylvania politician

== Sports ==
- Paul Miller (cyclist) (born 1963), Australian professional road cyclist
- Paul Miller (defensive end) (1930–2007), NFL player
- Paul Miller (halfback) (1913–1992), NFL player
- Paul Miller (American football coach) (born c. 1950), American football coach
- Paul Miller (baseball) (born 1965), 1990s major league baseball pitcher
- Paul Miller (basketball) (born 1982), American basketball player
- Paul Miller (boxer) (born 1978), Australian boxer
- Paul Miller (footballer, born 1959), English footballer, played for Tottenham
- Paul Miller (footballer, born 1968), English footballer, played for Wimbledon and Bristol Rovers
- Paul Miller (ice hockey) (born 1959), retired American professional ice hockey forward
- Paul Miller (rugby union) (born 1977), former New Zealand rugby union player
- Paul Miller, American former racing driver, see Paul Miller Racing

== Other ==
- Paul Miller (journalist) (1906–1991), head of Gannett Company and the Associated Press
- Paul A. Miller (1917–2015), president of the Rochester Institute of Technology, 1969–1979
- Paul Steven Miller (1961–2010), lawyer, disability rights advocate and professor
- Paul F. Miller (1932–2012), American sculptor and art educator
- Paul Miller (author), British digital consultant, author and social entrepreneur
- Paul Nicholas Miller, better known as GypsyCrusader (born 1988), American white supremacist internet personality

== See also ==
- Paul Millar (disambiguation)
