= Alexander Miller =

Alexander Miller may refer to:

- Alexander Miller (theologian) (1908–1960), Scottish-born cosmopolitan writer
- Alexander Kennedy Miller (1906–1993), American collector
- Alexander Miller (composer) (born 1968), American composer
- Alexander Miller (merchant), Scottish merchant
- Alexander Miller (tailor) (1559-1616), Scottish tailor to James VI
- Alex Miller (born 1949), Scottish association football player and manager
- Alex Miller (1890s footballer) (fl. 1888–1898), Scottish footballer
- Alex Miller (writer) (born 1936), Australian novelist
- Alex Miller (politician) (born 1977), member of the Knesset for Yisrael Beiteinu
- Alex Miller (lobbyist) (1922–1998), political lobbyist in Alaska
- Alex Miller (died 1965), better known as Sonny Boy Williamson II, American blues musician

== See also ==
- Aleksandr Aleksandrovich Miller (1875–1935), Russian and Soviet archaeologist, ethnologist and painter
- Alex Millar (disambiguation)
- Sandy Millar (born 1939), Anglican bishop
