= Let Freedom Ring =

Let Freedom Ring may refer to:

== Drama, film, and television ==
- Let Freedom Ring (film), a 1939 film directed by Jack Conway
- Let Freedom Ring, another title used for the 1935 film It's in the Air
- Let Freedom Ring (play), 1935 play by Albert Bein
- "Let Freedom Ring" (Strangers with Candy), 1999 episode of the television series Strangers with Candy
- Let Freedom Ring, a 2002 video filmed at Carnegie Hall in the Gaither Homecoming series

== Literature ==
- Let Freedom Ring, a 1928 book by Arthur Garfield Hays
- Let Freedom Ring, a 2013 book by Stanley Tretick
- "Let Freeedom Ring", a speech written and delivered by Archibald Carey Jr. at the 1952 Republican National Convention
- "Let Freedom Ring", a 1950 short story by Fritz Leiber
- "Let Freedom Ring!", a 1945 short story by Rog Phillips
- Let Freedom Ring: Winning the War of Liberty over Liberalism, a 2002 book by Sean Hannity

== Music ==
=== Albums/EPs ===
- Let Freedom Ring (EP), a 2017 EP by Japanese singer-songwriter Hiroya Ozaki
- Let Freedom Ring (Jackie McLean album), 1963 album by American jazz saxophonist Jackie McLean
- Let Freedom Ring (Jonnie and Brookie album), 2002 album by American pop rock duo Jonnie and Brookie
- Let Freedom Ring, a 1997 album by Timothy Wright
- Let Freedom Ring, a 2009 album and song by Chuck Prophet
- Let Freedom Ring, a 2012 album by Sparky and Rhonda Rucker
- Let Freedom Ring!, a 2003 album by Denys Baptiste
- Let Freedom Ring, an album by the Texas A&M Singing Cadets

=== Songs ===
- "Let Freedom Ring", a song by Rodney Crowell and Keith Sykes on the 1986 album Street Language
- "Let Freedom Ring", a song by The Nightwatchman on the 2004 album For the Lady and the 2007 album One Man Revolution
- "Let Freedom Ring", a song by Charlie Daniels, Taz DiGregorio, Charlie Hayward, Jack Gavin, Bruce Ray Brown on the 1991 album Renegade and the 2003 album Freedom and Justice for All
- "Let Freedom Ring", a song on Barry Manilow's 2004 album 2 Nights Live!
- "Let Freedom Ring", a 1997 song by Jade Starling
- "Let Freedom Ring", a song by Mark Germino on the soundtrack of the 1995 film Mad Love

=== Other ===
- "Let Freedom Ring", a 1998 music composition for orchestra and narrator by Alexander Miller
- "Let Freedom Ring", the third section of James Furman's oratorio I Have a Dream
- "Let Freedom Ring", a 1996 remix by Pretty Poison
- "Let Freedom Ring!", a music composition for marching band by Ed Huckeby
- "Let Freedom Ring, a 2003 concert by Sandler and Young for the victims of 9/11

== Other ==
- Let Freedom Ring, Inc., American non-profit, public policy think tank
- Let Freedom Ring, a 2023 art installation at the National Mall in Washington D. C. by artist Paul Ramirez Jonas
- Let Freedom Ring, an award winning art work by Lena Blackbird
- Let Freedom Ring, an annual festival in Mount Morris, Illinois that features the ringing of the Illinois Freedom Bell
- Let Freedom Ring, a series of celebrations organized by the Sons of the Revolution since 1969
- Let Freedom Ring, the slogan of FreePBX
- Let Freedom Ring, the slogan on vehicle registration plates of Pennsylvania
- Let Freedom Ring, the theme of the 1990 Snellville Days Festival
- Let Freedom Ring, a 2005 event at the Kennedy Center attended by George W. Bush
- Let Freedom Ring, a talk radio show founded by Jody Hice

== See Also ==
- "My Country, 'Tis of Thee", American patriotic song with lyrics that include "Let Freedom Ring"
