= Barry Smyth =

Northern Irish chef

- Born: Armagh, Northern Ireland
- Culinary career
- Cooking style: Modern Irish cuisine
- Current restaurants
- The Oriel (former), The Flavoursmyth
- Award
- Michelin star (2004, 2005)

Barry Smyth is a Northern Irish chef, culinary educator, and food entrepreneur. He is best known as the head chef of The Oriel restaurant in Gilford, County Down, which was awarded Michelin stars in 2004 and 2005. Smyth is currently the chef-director of The Flavoursmyth, a mobile catering and street food business based in Armagh.

== Career ==
Smyth began his culinary career in several notable kitchens, including The Connaught in London and Roscoff in Belfast, working under chef Paul Rankin.

He opened The Oriel in Gilford in 1999, and under his leadership, the restaurant received Michelin stars in 2004 and 2005. He sold the business in 2006 and transitioned into consultancy and education.

Smyth served as a chef lecturer at Southern Regional College and Belfast Metropolitan College. In 2016, he was a finalist in the Craft Guild of Chefs Awards for "Chef Lecturer of the Year".

In 2018, Smyth was appointed Head Chef at Castle Leslie Estate in Monaghan. In 2019, he partnered with Simon Dougan of Yellow Door to manage catering at Hillsborough Castle under a five-year contract, creating 35 jobs.

== The Flavoursmyth ==
Smyth now operates The Flavoursmyth, a street food and event catering brand serving gourmet dishes from a converted Airstream trailer. His menu focuses on UK and Irish produce, including Armagh Dexter beef, and draws on his fine dining background.

He is a regular at food festivals including the Belfast Christmas Market, where his Festive Loaded Fries—a dish of turkey, ham, stuffing, cranberry, and gravy over chips—has become a seasonal favourite.

== Awards ==
- Michelin Star (2004, 2005) – The Oriel
- Finalist, Craft Guild of Chefs Awards – Chef Lecturer of the Year (2016)

== See also ==
- List of Michelin-starred restaurants in Northern Ireland
- Northern Irish cuisine
