= Taichi Mukai =

Taichi Mukai 向井 太一
- Born: 13 March 1992 (age 34); Fukuoka, Japan
- Origin: Tokyo
- Genres: Alternative R&B; contemporary R&B; pop; ambient; electro
- Occupations: Singer-songwriter; model
- Instrument: Singing
- Years active: 2010–present
- Labels: ILLXXX; Miya Terrace; Toy's Factory
- Website: taichimukai.com

Taichi Mukai (向井太一, Mukai Taichi; born 13 March 1992) is a Japanese singer, songwriter and model from Fukuoka. He was previously a member of the funk band Modio and signed with Miya Terrace in 2017 as a solo artist, releasing his debut studio album, Blue. Mukai has collaborated with a range of artists including Sik-K, Jevon, M-Flo, and Minmi.

== Music career ==
In 2010, Mukai moved to Tokyo from his hometown, Fukuoka to pursue his musical career as a singer. He started singing as a member of a funk band, Modio. In November 2011, he withdrew from the band and determined to start his career as a solo singer.

Mukai released his song "Kimi ni Kiss shite" on 22 October, on SoundCloud. The song was well-received online and he continued to post some songs of his.

On 7 June 2015, he started to write a blog on the website of one of the most famous Japanese men's fashion magazine, Men's Fudge.

On 30 March 2016, he released his first EP Pool, which features six songs he had posted on his SoundCloud page.

On 26 October 2016, he released "Slow Down" as the lead single from his second EP 24. The song is known for sampling Jeremih's "Oui".

On 19 November 2016, he released his second EP 24.

In July 2017, he announced that he'd perform at the Summer Sonic Festival 2017.

== Discography ==
=== Albums ===
==== Studio albums ====
| Title | Album details | Peak chart positions | |
| Title | Album details | JPN Billboard | JPN Oricon |
|---|---|---|---|
| Blue | Released: 29 November 2017; Labels: Toy's Factory; Formats: CD, digital download | 55 | 70 |
| Pure | Released: 14 November 2018; Labels: Toy's Factory; Formats: CD, CD+DVD, digital download | 26 | 47 |
| Savage | Released: 18 September 2019; Labels: Toy's Factory; Formats: CD, CD+DVD, digital download | 41 | 39 |
| Colorless | Released: 21 April 2021; Labels: Toy's Factory; Formats: CD, CD+DVD, digital download | 39 | 50 |
| Antidote | Released: 11 May 2022; Labels: Toy's Factory; Formats: CD, CD+DVD, digital download | TBA | 42 |

==== Compilation albums ====
| Title | Album details | Peak chart positions | |
| Title | Album details | JPN Billboard | JPN Dig. |
|---|---|---|---|
| The Last | Released: 25 October 2023; Labels: Toy's Factory; Formats: digital download | — | — |

==== Live albums ====
| Title | Album details | Peak chart positions | |
| Title | Album details | JPN Billboard | JPN Dig. |
|---|---|---|---|
| Savage Tour 2019 | Released: 17 June 2020; Labels: Toy's Factory; Formats: digital download | 49 | 14 |

=== Extended plays ===
| Title | Album details | Peak chart positions | |
| Title | Album details | JPN | JPN Dig. |
|---|---|---|---|
| Pool | Released: 30 March 2016; Label: ILLXXX; Format: CD | — | — |
| 24 | Released: 19 November 2016; Label: Miya Terrace; Format: Digital download, CD | — | — |
| Play | Released: 23 August 2017; Label: Toy's Factory; Format: Digital download, streaming | — | — |
| Love | Released: 27 June 2018; Label: Toy's Factory; Format: Digital download, streaming | 75 | 26 |
| 27 | Released: 19 June 2019; Label: Toy's Factory; Format: Digital download, streaming | 78 | 26 |
| Supplement | Released: 29 July 2020; Label: Toy's Factory; Format: Digital download, streaming | — | — |
| Doors | Released: 22 September 2021; Label: Toy's Factory; Format: Digital download, streaming | — | — |
| Canvas | Released: 28 June 2023; Label: Toy's Factory; Format: Digital download, streaming | — | — |

=== Singles ===
==== As lead artist ====
| Title | Year | Album |
|---|---|---|
| "Slow Down" | 2016 | 24 |
| "Fly" | 2017 | Blue |
| "Sora" (featuring SALU) | 2017 | Blue |
| "Guerrilla" (with Akko Gorilla) | 2017 | Green Queen |
| "Siren" | 2018 | Love |
| "Crazy" | 2018 | Pure |
| "Reset" | 2018 | Pure |
| "Pure" | 2018 | Pure |
| "Michi" | 2019 | Savage |
| "Savage" | 2019 | Savage |
| "Get Loud" | 2020 | Colorless |
| "Love Is Life" | 2021 | Colorless |
| "Baby Cakes" | 2021 | Colorless |

==== As featured artist ====
| Title | Year | Album |
|---|---|---|
| "Great Yard" (starRo featuring Taichi Mukai) | 2017 | Blue |
| "Message" (Monster Rion featuring Taichi Mukai) | 2017 | Message |
| "Period" (過程, Katei) (YonYon featuring Taichi Mukai) | 2017 | Non-album single |
| "Slave of Love" (Yousa and Taar featuring Taichi Mukai and Minmi) | 2018 | Modern Disco Tours |
| "Promises" (with Jevon) | 2018 | Non-album single |
| "Rendezvous" (Julia Wu featuring Taichi Mukai) | 2018 | Non-album single |
| "Weather" (LightHouse featuring Taichi Mukai) | 2018 | TBA |
| "2nite" (Slom and Ace Hashimoto featuring Taichi Mukai) | 2019 | TBA |
| "Groovin' in the Sunshine" (DJ Hasebe featuring Basi and Taichi Mukai) | 2019 | Wonderful Tomorrow |
| "Tell Me Tell Me" (m-flo loves Sik-K & eill, Taichi Mukai) | 2020 | TBA |
| "Trigger" (Celsior Coupe featuring Taichi Mukai and Numb) | 2020 | TBA |

==== Promotional singles ====
| Title | Year | Album |
|---|---|---|
| "Kimi ni Kiss Shite" | 2012 | Blue |
| "Echo" | 2013 | Non-album single |
| "Everything" | 2013 | Non-album single |
| "This Is Me" | 2014 | Pool |
| "Pool" | 2014 | Pool |
| "Wonderland" | 2014 | Pool |
| "Rescue Me" | 2014 | Pool |
| "Rise" | 2014 | Pool |
| "Zen" | 2016 | Play |
| "Yellow" | 2017 | Play |
| "Can't Wait Anymore" | 2017 | Blue |
| "Rock Wit'cha" | 2018 | Non-album single |
| "I Like It" | 2019 | 27 |
| "ICBU" | 2019 | Savage |
| "Colorless" | 2021 | Colorless |

=== Other appearance ===
| Title | Year | Other artist(s) | Album |
|---|---|---|---|
| "Hajimari no Machi" (Soul Feeling Mix) | 2017 | Hiroya Ozaki | Let Freedom Ring |
| "Good Time" | 2017 | Mop of Head | Aspiration |
| "Don't Give Up on Love" | 2017 | Pa's Lam System | Whatever |
| "Highway Records" | 2019 | She Is Summer and Simon | Miracle Food |
| "I Believe" | 2019 | —N/a | Another Voice: Full of Harmony Tribute Album |
| "Now & Forever" | 2020 | Shingo Katori and Sonpub | 20200101 |
| "Beautiful" | 2021 | Ken the 390 and Sky-Hi | En Route |
