= Sankichi =

- Gender: Male

Origin
- Origin: Japanese
- Meaning: Different meanings depending on the kanji used

Sankichi (written: 三吉) is a masculine Japanese given name. Notable people with the name include:

- Sankichi Ozaki (尾崎 三吉; 1912–1994), Japanese photographer
- Satō Sankichi (佐藤 三吉; 1857–1947), Japanese surgeon
- Sankichi Takahashi (高橋 三吉; 1882–1966), Imperial Japanese Navy admiral
- Sankichi Tōge (峠 三吉; 1917–1953), Japanese poet and activist
