= Susumu Tachi =

Japanese academic

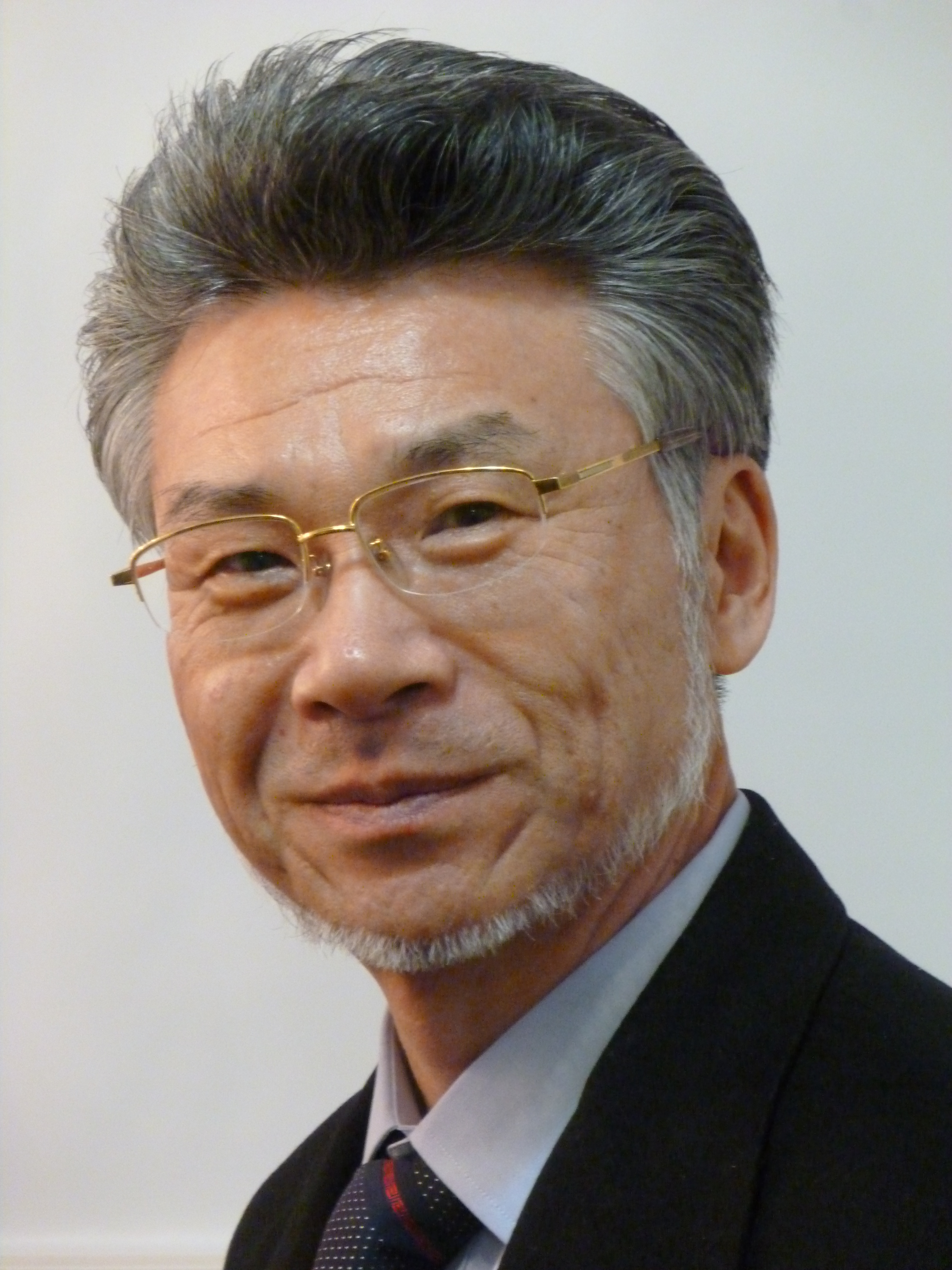
- Tachi in 2011
- Born: 1 January 1946 (age 80); Tokyo, Japan
- Education: The University of Tokyo (BE, 1968; ME, 1970: PhD, 1973)
- Known for: Telexistence; Active camouflage
- Scientific career
- Fields: Virtual reality, robotics
- Workplaces: The University of Tokyo; Keio University; Mechanical Engineering Laboratory; MIT
- Doctoral advisor: Takashi Isobe
- Doctoral students: Masahiko Inami

Susumu Tachi (舘 暲, Tachi Susumu; born January 1, 1946) is professor emeritus of the University of Tokyo, Founding President of the Virtual Reality Society of Japan, and Founding Chairman of Telexistence Inc.

== Education ==
Dr. Tachi received the B.E., M.S., and Ph.D. degrees in mathematical engineering and information physics from the University of Tokyo in 1968, 1970, and 1973, respectively.

== Academic career ==
He joined the Faculty of Engineering of the University of Tokyo in 1973, and in 1975 moved to the Mechanical Engineering Laboratory, Ministry of International Trade and Industry, Tsukuba Science City, Japan, where he served as the Director of the Biorobotics Division. From 1979 to 1980, Dr. Tachi was a Japanese Government Award Senior Visiting Scientist at the Massachusetts Institute of Technology, Cambridge, USA, and in 1988 he served as Chairman of the IMEKO (International Measurement Confederation) Technical Committee on Measurement in Robotics. In 1989 he rejoined the University of Tokyo, and served as a professor at the Department of Information Physics and Computing until March 2009. In April 2009, he moved to Keio University, where he served as a professor at the Graduate School of Media Design and the Director of the International Virtual Reality Center until March 2015. From April 2015 to March 2020, he conducted the JST ACCEL "Embodied Media" research project at the Tachi Laboratory, Institute of Gerontology, the University of Tokyo, as Research Director. In January 2017, he founded and became Chairman of Telexistence Inc. Prof. Tachi was conferred the title of professor emeritus of the University of Tokyo in June 2009.

== Research ==
One of his early scientific achievements is the invention (1975) and development of an intelligent mobile robot system for the blind called the Guide Dog Robot (1976–1983), which was the first of its kind. This system is known as MELDOG.

In 1980, Dr. Tachi invented the concept of telexistence, which enables a highly realistic sense of existence in a remote place without any actual travel, and has been working on the realization of telexistence since then.

Telexistence became the fundamental guiding principle of the eight-year Japanese National Large-Scale Project, “Advanced Robot Technology in Hazardous Environments” (1983–1990). Through this project, he conducted theoretical studies, established systematic design procedures, developed experimental hardware telexistence systems such as TELESAR, and demonstrated the feasibility of the concept.

His present research covers telexistence, real-time remote robotics (R-Cubed), and virtual reality. Key examples of his research in these areas include:

- TELESAR (TELExistence Surrogate Anthropomorphic Robot) series: This series represents the history of "telexistence"—a technology that allows a human to control a robot remotely and feel as if they are actually present in that remote environment. Key models include: TELESAR I (Proof of Concept; world's first anthropomorphic telexistence experiment); TELESAR II (Mutual Telexistence using RPT); TELESAR IV (Mobile + Mutual); TELESAR V (Haptic Primary Color Transmission); and TELESAR VI (67-DOF Full Avatar with 10-finger haptics).
- Retro-reflective Projection Technology: A technology that integrates information with an object using retro-reflective materials. By projecting images onto the object's surface, it can be made to appear transparent or to have a different texture. It is applied in technologies such as optical camouflage, transparent cockpits, and mutual telexistence.
- Haptic Primary Colors: A proposal of a fundamental principle for haptics that aims to reproduce diverse tactile sensations by decomposing and synthesizing haptic information into fundamental elements, similar to the three primary colors of light.
- Autostereoscopic VR: Research and development of VR technology based on new principles that allow users to experience stereoscopic images without special goggles. Prime examples include TWISTER, which uses a rotating barrier method; HaptoMirage, which uses a virtual shutter glass method; and Repro3D, which uses a retro-reflective projection method.

== Personal life and influences ==
- The most influential person in Tachi's early life and the one who directed him toward intellectual inquiry was his maternal grandfather. His grandfather was the nephew of Sankichi Sato, the first Japanese Professor of Surgery at the University of Tokyo (formerly Tokyo Imperial University). Because Tachi's great-grandfather died young, his grandfather was taken in by his great-grandfather's younger brother, Sankichi Sato, and grew up in a profoundly academic atmosphere. This academic environment was carried on in his grandfather's home, where the young Tachi grew up hearing stories of Sankichi Sato countless times.
- In the summer of 1965, a little over a year after entering the University of Tokyo, Tachi was undecided on his field of study as the application deadline approached. He was leaning towards physics but also had a vague interest in people and a desire to do research involving them. It was then that a reading of Norbert Wiener's “The Human Use of Human Beings” was broadcast from a radio he happened to turn on. He recalls that as soon as he heard it, a feeling “like being struck by lightning” ran through his whole body. He immediately rushed to the General Library of the University of Tokyo to find Wiener's books and became deeply engrossed in reading them. This experience convinced him to devote himself to cybernetics research. As a result, he decided to pursue that field and proceeded to the Department of Mathematical Engineering and Information Physics within the Faculty of Engineering, the University of Tokyo, the only place he could study cybernetics at the time.
- His second son is Tomohiro Tachi, an origami engineering researcher and a professor at the University of Tokyo.
- In 1991, Tachi founded the International Conference on Artificial Reality and Telexistence (ICAT) and hosted its inaugural meeting in Japan in July of that year. As the world's first international conference dedicated to virtual reality, ICAT attracted numerous prominent researchers and startup CEOs from abroad, despite being held in Japan. At the time, virtual reality was still in its infancy—not only exploring potential for societal and industrial applications, but also striving to establish itself as an academic discipline. ICAT is now recognized as the longest-running international conference in the field of virtual reality.
- In 1993, he founded the International-collegiate Virtual Reality Contest (IVRC) with the goal of popularizing VR among students and fostering young researchers. This student VR contest (now known as Interverse Virtual Reality Challenge) has since produced numerous individuals who are active across various fields – including many researchers and engineers in VR and human augmentation (embodied science), as well as artists, entrepreneurs, and industry leaders.
- In 1996, Tachi spearheaded the establishment of the Virtual Reality Society of Japan (VRSJ), recognizing the need for a dedicated academic platform to advance virtual reality research. By advocating for its importance and rallying support from fellow researchers, he laid the groundwork for the society and was subsequently appointed its first president. The founding vision of the VRSJ was to formalize virtual reality as an academic discipline and to foster dialogue and collaboration across diverse fields. Today, the society plays a central role in the academic community and continues to contribute to the development and dissemination of virtual reality studies in Japan and beyond.
- In 2004, Tachi initiated the “Cybernetics Society” (サイバネティクス研究会) with the aim of directly passing down the philosophy of "science and technology for humans to live in a human way," which he considers the essence of cybernetics. This Cybernetic Society serves as a community of researchers dedicated to human augmentation and related fields. Currently, over 80 Ph.D. holders are members of this society.

== Episodes ==
Guide Dog Robot (MELDOG)

- Tachi has spoken about the inspiration for his guide dog robot research:
  "Research on robots is about attempting to replicate human abilities with machines. However, the robots that had been realized around 1975 were only partial, replacing just a fraction of human functions, and there were almost none that achieved a comprehensive, intelligent function. Therefore, I wondered if it might be possible to create a machine that could replicate the intelligence of an animal, which is at a slightly lower level than a human. Furthermore, that function had to be useful to us humans. As I was thinking about this, I took my dog for a walk one evening. We entered a wooded grove on a dark night with no moonlight, and it was pitch black. Nevertheless, my dog walked along effortlessly. It suddenly occurred to me: 'What about a guide dog?'"
- Following preliminary studies in 1975 and 1976, research on the "Guide Dog Robot" (dubbed MELDOG) was conducted for six years from 1977 as a designated research project titled "Research on Locomotion Guidance Machines" by the Agency of Industrial Science and Technology (AIST) of the Ministry of International Trade and Industry (MITI). It was an era when a formal government project could not officially be named the "Guide Dog Robot."
- On June 8, 1983, the (then) Crown Prince Akihito and Crown Princess Michiko (now Emperor Emeritus and Empress Emerita), along with their eldest son, Prince Hiro (now the Emperor Naruhito), inspected the MELDOG guide dog robot. A photograph from this visit, showing Tachi explaining the robot's significance and technology to the Imperial family, is preserved as a record.
- The robot shown in the photograph from the Imperial visit is the "MELDOG MARK III." The subsequent prototype, "MELDOG MARK IV," is archived at the National Museum of Nature and Science in Tokyo.
- Arthur C. Clarke, famous for 2001: A Space Odyssey, featured the MELDOG in his 1986 book of predictions, Arthur C. Clarke's July 20, 2019: Life in the 21st Century. In the book, he depicted a future society where MELDOG robots were actively assisting people in cities. However, despite Clarke's prediction, that vision had not been realized by July 20, 2019.

Telexistence

- In the summer of 1980, Tachi returned from MIT to the Mechanical Engineering Laboratory (MEL) in Tsukuba. In connection with his MIT research, he began formulating a concept for a new evaluation device for mobility aids for the blind. He was preoccupied day and night with the core challenge of this concept: "whether it was possible to transmit the senses of a remote location to a person as if they were actually present." Early on the morning of September 19, 1980, while walking down a laboratory hallway, he had an "electrifying realization" (which he later called an epiphany). He reasoned that human vision perceives three dimensions from the two images on the retinas. Therefore, if technology could, through measurement and control, continuously provide a person with the identical retinal images they would receive from direct vision, they could essentially "exist" across space and time, even at a distance. He immediately returned to his lab and began writing down the flood of ideas. He stated that he simultaneously achieved a "great enlightenment" (大悟, daigo) on the principles of visual display.
- Tachi conceived the concept of telexistence on September 19, 1980. He filed a patent for it under the title "Evaluation Device for Mobility Aids for the Blind" on December 26, 1980, and another for a "Manipulator with Sensory Information Presentation Function" on January 11, 1981. Because the invention was so far ahead of its time, by the 2020s—when the boom in avatars and the "metaverse" began—40 years had passed, and the 20-year patent terms had long expired.
- Tachi has described the profound impact of his first experience with the telexistence system he built:
  "After conceiving of telexistence, I immediately wanted to test it, so I allocated funds to build a device. Initially, it was a visual-only system. The stereoscopic display, which was designed to be equivalent to the retinal images one would see directly, was completed, and I first experimented with it around the end of 1981. I felt as if I existed in a three-dimensional world, as if I had an out-of-body experience (幽体離脱, yūtai ridatsu), and I could observe my own self raising and lowering my hands in real-time. Although it was a black-and-white world, I was deeply moved by this state of objectively observing myself. Was the 'me' who was watching the real me, or was the 'me' being watched the real me? It was an unforgettable feeling, and I believe this very emotion is the true origin of telexistence."
- This experience was echoed by others. When Grant Fjermedal visited Tachi's laboratory and tried the telexistence device, he reported feeling the "exact same out-of-body experience" (OOBE) that Tachi had described, as documented in his 1986 book, The Tomorrow Makers. Similarly, Howard Rheingold visited the lab, tested the system, and wrote about feeling the "exact same out-of-body sensation" in his 1991 book, Virtual Reality.

== Organizational affiliations ==
Prof. Tachi is a Founding Director and Fellow of the Robotics Society of Japan (RSJ); the 46th President and Fellow of the Society of Instrument and Control Engineers (SICE); a Fellow of the Japan Society of Mechanical Engineers (JSME); and the Founding President and Fellow of the Virtual Reality Society of Japan (VRSJ). Dr. Tachi was inducted into the inaugural class of the IEEE Virtual Reality Academy in 2022. See also his work on cloaking technology.(link to video on YouTube)
