= Alex Millar =

Alex Millar or Alexander Miller may refer to:

- Alex Millar (footballer) (1911–1977), Scottish footballer
- Alex Millar (poker) (born 1985), British professional poker player
- Alex Millar (Being Human), fictional television character
- Alexander Millar, frontman of American rock band Vattica

== See also ==
- Alexander Miller (disambiguation)
