= Derek Miller =

Derek Miller may refer to:

- Derek Miller (Canadian musician)
- Derek Miller (field hockey)
- Derek E. Miller, assistant prosecutor in Macomb County
- Derek B. Miller, American novelist
- Derek Miller, member of American musical group Sleigh Bells

== See also ==
- Derek Millar, Burmese musician
