= Danni Barry =

Irish chef

- Born: Mayobridge, County Down
- Culinary career
- Rating: Michelin stars
- Current restaurant: Eipic
- Previous restaurant(s): Rogan & Co
- Television show: Great British Menu BBC Farm to Feast (judge)
- Award won: Irish Chef of the Year 2017

Danni Barry is a chef. She was the head chef of Eipic restaurant in Northern Ireland and executive chef in Balloo House. She is now executive chef in Ballynahinch Castle, Connemara, Galway. She was the second female Irish chef to hold a Michelin star. In 2016, she was named Irish Chef of the Year.

== Career ==
Barry began working in a professional kitchen at the age of 14, as a kitchen porter. She began to work as a chef after attending a catering college in Newry, Northern Ireland. She was mentored by chef Michael Deane, and started to work his restaurant Deanes in 2003. Barry travelled around the world to gain experience as a chef, including at Simon Rogan's L'Enclume restaurant. She moved on to work as sous chef under Raymond McCardle at Restaurant 23, before becoming head chef for Rogan at his Cartmel based restaurant Cartmel & Co in 2012.

In 2014, she left to return to Northern Ireland where she opened restaurant Eipic as head chef under Deane, who owns the restaurant. Barry gained a Michelin star within 18 months, becoming the only female chef in Ireland to hold the award, and only the second ever. In addition to cooking, she also forages herbs and wild garlic several times a week.

Barry has appeared on BBC Two cooking competition Great British Menu in 2015, where she competed for Northern Ireland against Ben Arnold and Chris McGowan. In 2016, she was named Irish Chef of the Year at the ninth Irish Restaurant Awards, while the restaurant was named Ulster Restaurant of the Year and owner Deanes won Entrepreneur of the Year. The same year, Barry was named one of 17 chefs to watch by Olive magazine.
