= The Muddlers Club =

Restaurant in Belfast, Northern Ireland

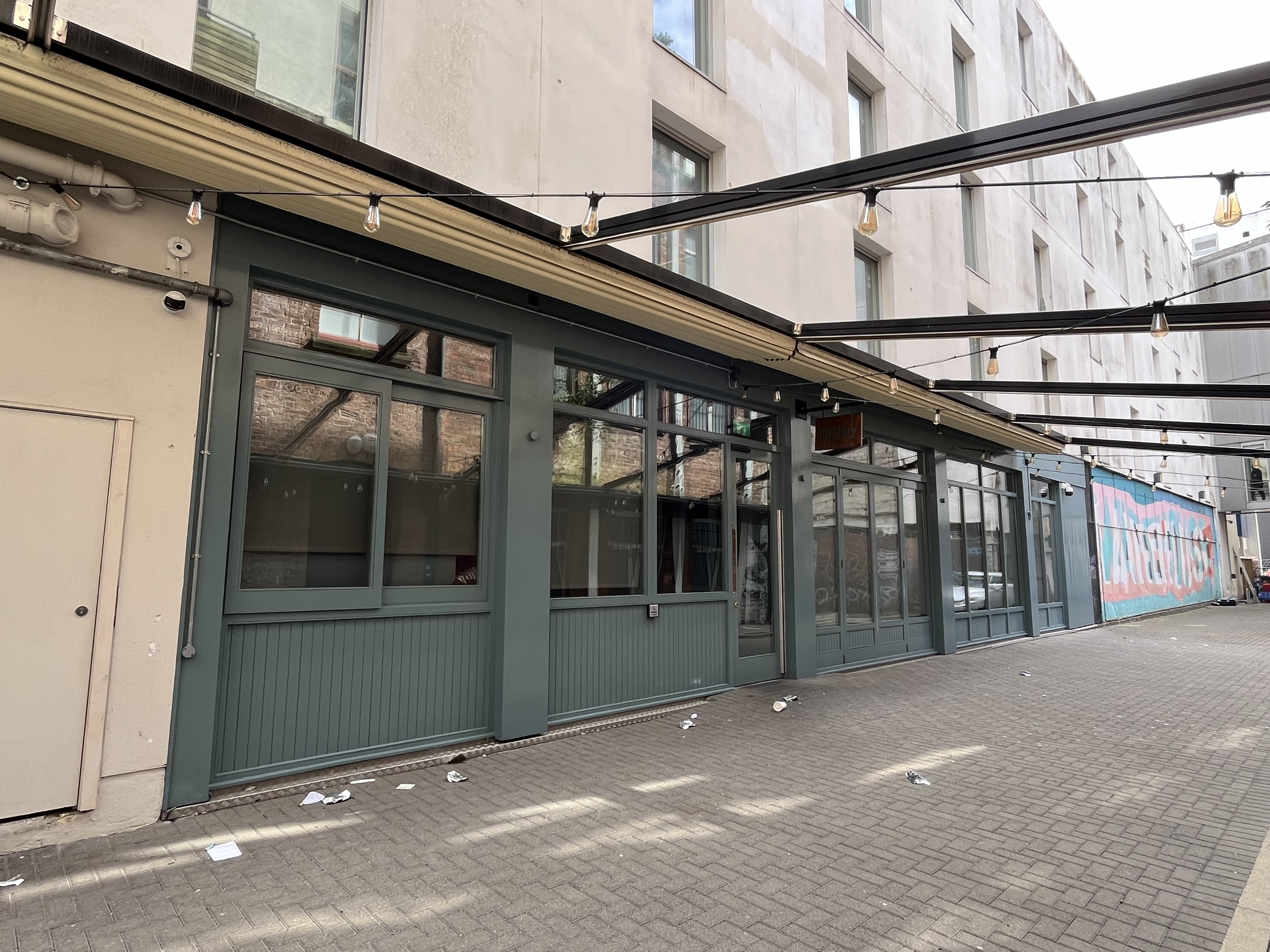

- Location within Greater Belfast

Restaurant information
- Established: 24 October 2015
- Owner: Gareth McCaughey
- Head chef: Gareth McCaughey
- Food type: Irish cuisine
- Rating: Michelin Guide
- Location: 1 Warehouse Lane, Belfast, BT1 2DX, Northern Ireland
- Coordinates: 54.601561°N 5.927226°W
- Website: themuddlersclubbelfast.com

The Muddlers Club is a restaurant in Belfast, Northern Ireland. It was awarded a Michelin star in the 2020 Michelin Guide Great Britain & Ireland.

Chef patron Gareth McCaughey (formerly of Ox) founded The Muddlers Club in 2015, naming it after a revolutionary secret society linked to the United Irishmen that met in the area in the 1790s. It is located in the Cathedral Quarter.

== Awards ==
- Michelin star: since 2020

== See also ==
- List of Michelin-starred restaurants in Northern Ireland
