= Tokyo Jukebox 2 =

Studio album by Marty Friedman
- Released: September 14, 2011
- Studio: The Village Recorder, Los Angeles, California; Additional recording at Crescent Studio, Avaco Creative Studio, Power House Studio, all Tokyo, Japan
- Length: 46:40
- Label: HPQ

Marty Friedman chronology
Bad DNA (2010)	Tokyo Jukebox 2 (2011)	Metal Clone X (2012)

Tokyo Jukebox 2 is the tenth studio album by the American guitarist Marty Friedman. Similar to the first cover album Tokyo Jukebox, this album is a collection of instrumental covers of Japanese songs, produced and arranged by Marty Friedman himself.

== Track listing ==
No.	Title	Length
1.	"Yeah! Meccha Holiday" (Aya Matsuura cover)	3:09
2.	"Nada Sousou" (Rimi Natsukawa cover)	2:49
3.	"Ai Takatta" (AKB48 cover)	4:28
4.	"Ame no Bojyo Funa Uta" (Aki Yashiro cover)	2:42
5.	"Toire no Kamisama" (Kana Uemura cover)	5:58
6.	"Canon a la Koto" (Johann Pachelbel cover)	1:55
7.	"I Love You" (Yutaka Ozaki cover)	3:48
8.	"Sunao ni Naretara" (Juju cover)	3:41
9.	"Butterfly" (Kaela Kimura cover)	2:51
10.	"Beautiful Days" (Arashi cover)	4:50
11.	"Little Braver" (Girls Dead Monster cover)	4:37
12.	"Mata Kimi Ni Koishi Teru" (Fuyumi Sakamoto cover)	3:26
13.	"Sukiyaki" (Kyu Sakamoto cover)	2:29
Total length:		46:52
