= Robbie Millar =

- Born: 26 April 1967; Northern Ireland
- Died: 13 August 2005 (aged 38); Northern Ireland

Robbie Millar (26 April 1967 – 13 August 2005) was a head chef and restaurateur from Ballycarry in County Antrim, Northern Ireland.

Millar started his career at restaurants in Corfu, Zurich and London before returning to Northern Ireland to work in Paul Rankin's Roscoff restaurant in Belfast. While at Roscoff he met his future wife Shirley, who managed the restaurant. In 1994 he opened Shanks Restaurant at the Blackwood golf centre, part of the Clandeboye Estate in Bangor.

In 1996 the restaurant was awarded a Michelin Star, an award it held for ten years. Other awards include the Egon Ronay Guide Newcomer of the Year in 1995 and three Automobile Association rosettes. Millar was columnist for the Belfast Telegraph and made regular television appearances as a judge on the BBC's MasterChef programme with Loyd Grossman.

Influenced by Rankin, Shanks had a Californian style. The interior of the restaurant was designed by Terence Conran.

In August 2005 Millar was killed in a car accident on the Ballysallagh Road near Holywood, County Down. His Maserati left the road, hitting a fence and killing him instantly. The road is an accident blackspot, with two other deaths in April 2006. His funeral was attended by other prominent local chefs Paul & Jeanne Rankin and Michael Deane. On 31 May 2006 the coroner's report into Millar's death was released. It found that he died of multiple injuries, mainly caused by the fence he crashed into. A road accident expert stated that if the fence had met new safety standards, Millar might have survived the crash. While his blood alcohol level was found to be marginally over the legal limit, the coroner did not find this to be a significant cause.

Millar is interred in Ballycarry New Cemetery, alongside his brother Brian, who died in 1982.

At the time of his death he had three young children, between one and six years old.
