= Shanks Restaurant =

Coordinates: 54°39′37.67″N 5°41′46.99″W

- Interactive map of Shanks Restaurant

Restaurant information
- Established: 1989
- Closed: 2005
- Head chef: Robbie Millar
- Food type: Modern European
- Location: 150 Crawfordsburn Road, Bangor, Northern Ireland

Shanks Restaurant was a restaurant located in Bangor, Northern Ireland, that was awarded one Michelin star each year in the period 1996–2005. It became one of Northern Ireland's top restaurants, alongside Cayenne and Deane's.

Shanks restaurant was opened in 1994, and was since owned and run by Robbie Millar and his wife, Shirley.

The restaurant, designed by Terence Conran, had an unusual set up. The main restaurant is in the basement while the balcony is used for Al fresco dining. The ground floor is mainly used as reception area and bar. The Californian styled restaurant was located on the grounds of the Blackwood Golf Course.

In April 1995, it was named Egon Ronay Newcomer of the Year for Ireland.

The restaurant was closed down in 2005, when head chef and co-owner Robbie Millar died after crashing his Maserati sports car in the Craigantlet Hills.

== See also ==
- List of Michelin-starred restaurants in Northern Ireland
