= List of Michelin-starred restaurants in Northern Ireland =

As of the 2026 guide, there are 2 restaurants in Northern Ireland with a Michelin-star rating, a rating system used by the Michelin Guide to grade restaurants based on their quality.

The Michelin Guides have been published by the French tire company Michelin since 1900. They were designed as a guide to tell drivers about eateries they recommended to visit and to subtly sponsor their tires, by encouraging drivers to use their cars more and therefore need to replace the tires as they wore out. Over time, the stars that were given out became more valuable.

Multiple anonymous Michelin inspectors visit the restaurants several times. They rate the restaurants on five criteria: "quality of products", "mastery of flavor and cooking techniques", "the personality of the chef represented in the dining experience", "value for money", and "consistency between inspectors' visits". Inspectors have at least ten years of expertise and create a list of popular restaurants supported by media reports, reviews, and diner popularity. If they reach a consensus, Michelin awards restaurants from one to three stars based on its evaluation methodology: one star means "high-quality cooking, worth a stop", two stars signify "excellent cooking, worth a detour", and three stars denote "exceptional cuisine, worth a special journey". The stars are not permanent and restaurants are constantly re-evaluated. If the criteria are not met, the restaurant will lose its stars.

Restaurants in Northern Ireland are reviewed as part of the Michelin Guide Great Britain & Ireland, which updates annually each winter. While Northern Ireland was assessed by the Michelin Guide from 1974, a restaurant in the region did not receive a star until 1991.

== Lists ==
=== 2020–2026 ===
Key
1 Michelin star	One Michelin star
—	The restaurant did not receive a star that year
Closed	The restaurant is no longer open

Michelin-starred restaurants
Name	Cuisine	Location	2020	2021	2022	2023	2024	2025	2026
Eipic	Irish	Belfast	1 Michelin star	1 Michelin star	1 Michelin star	1 Michelin star	Closed		
Ox	Irish	Belfast	1 Michelin star	1 Michelin star	1 Michelin star	1 Michelin star	1 Michelin star	1 Michelin star	1 Michelin star
The Muddlers Club	Irish	Belfast	1 Michelin star	1 Michelin star	1 Michelin star	1 Michelin star	1 Michelin star	1 Michelin star	1 Michelin star
Reference									

=== 2010–2019 ===
Key
1 Michelin star	One Michelin star
—	The restaurant did not receive a star that year

Michelin-starred restaurants
Name	Cuisine	Location	2010	2011	2012	2013	2014	2015	2016	2017	2018	2019
Deanes	Irish	Belfast	1 Michelin star	—	—	—	—	—	—	—	—	—
Eipic	Irish	Belfast	—	—	—	—	—	—	1 Michelin star	1 Michelin star	1 Michelin star	1 Michelin star
Ox	Irish	Belfast	—	—	—	—	—	—	1 Michelin star	1 Michelin star	1 Michelin star	1 Michelin star
Reference												

=== 2000–2009 ===
Key
1 Michelin star	One Michelin star
—	The restaurant did not receive a star that year
Closed	The restaurant is no longer open

Michelin-starred restaurants
Name	Cuisine	Location	2000	2001	2002	2003	2004	2005	2006	2007	2008	2009
Deanes	Irish	Belfast	1 Michelin star	1 Michelin star	1 Michelin star	1 Michelin star	1 Michelin star	1 Michelin star	1 Michelin star	1 Michelin star	1 Michelin star	1 Michelin star
Shanks Restaurant	Modern	Bangor	1 Michelin star	1 Michelin star	1 Michelin star	1 Michelin star	1 Michelin star	1 Michelin star	Closed			
The Oriel	French	Gilford	—	—	—	—	1 Michelin star	1 Michelin star	Closed			
Reference												

=== 1990–1999 ===
Key
1 Michelin star	One Michelin star
—	The restaurant did not receive a star that year

Michelin-starred restaurants
Name	Cuisine	Location	1990	1991	1992	1993	1994	1995	1996	1997	1998	1999
Deanes	Irish	Belfast	—	—	—	—	—	—	—	—	1 Michelin star	1 Michelin star
Deans on the Square	Irish	Helen's Bay	—	—	—	—	—	—	—	1 Michelin star	—	—
Roscoff		Belfast	—	1 Michelin star	1 Michelin star	1 Michelin star	1 Michelin star	1 Michelin star	1 Michelin star	1 Michelin star	1 Michelin star	—
Shanks Restaurant	Modern	Bangor	—	—	—	—	—	—	1 Michelin star	1 Michelin star	1 Michelin star	1 Michelin star
Reference												

== See also ==
- List of Michelin-starred restaurants in England
- List of Michelin-starred restaurants in Ireland
- List of Michelin-starred restaurants in Scotland
- List of Michelin-starred restaurants in Wales
- Lists of restaurants
