= The Oriel =

Former restaurant in Northern Ireland

Coordinates: 54°22′19″N 6°21′36″W

- Interactive map of The Oriel

Restaurant information
- Established: 2002
- Closed: 2006
- Head chef: Barry Smyth
- Food type: French, Irish and Modern Irish
- Rating: Michelin Guide
- Location: 2 Bridge Street, Gilford, County Down, Northern Ireland

The Oriel (also known as The Oriel of Gilford) was a restaurant in Gilford, County Down, Northern Ireland. It was a fine dining restaurant that was awarded one Michelin star in both 2004 and 2005.

In 2005 the restaurant also gained recognition of the Egon Ronay Guide. The Guide listed it as one of the 25 best restaurants in the United Kingdom. The restaurant closed down in 2006. The head chef of The Oriel was Barry Smyth.

== See also ==
- List of Michelin-starred restaurants in Northern Ireland
