= Kate Smith (presenter) =

British journalist

- Born: Belleek, County Fermanagh, Northern Ireland
- Occupations: Television presenter, Journalist
- Spouse: Michael Deane
- Children: 1

Kate Smith (born in Belleek, County Fermanagh) is a former television presenter and journalist from Northern Ireland.

== Broadcasting career ==
Smith began her broadcasting career at Downtown Radio as a newsreader and reporter. She later worked as a presenter and reporter for RTÉ in 1980 and moved to UTV in 1983.

Smith hosted her last edition of UTV Live in December 2006. She was appointed a board member of Northern Ireland Screen in December 2007.

== Personal life ==
Before her broadcasting career, Smith studied sociology and psychology at Queen's University, Belfast and took a postgraduate course in sociology at University College Dublin. Her first journalism work was as an agony aunt for the Sunday News paper.

Smith has worked with a number of charities, including the William Keown Trust, the Prince's Trust, CLIC Sergeant Cancer Care and The Children's Cancer Unit Charity. She is married to Belfast restaurateur Michael Deane and they have one son, Marco.

== Retirement from television ==
After retiring from UTV IN December 2006, Smith She is now fully involved in running Deanes Restaurants with husband Michael Deane.
