= Deanes =

Restaurant in Belfast, Northern Ireland

Deanes Restaurants
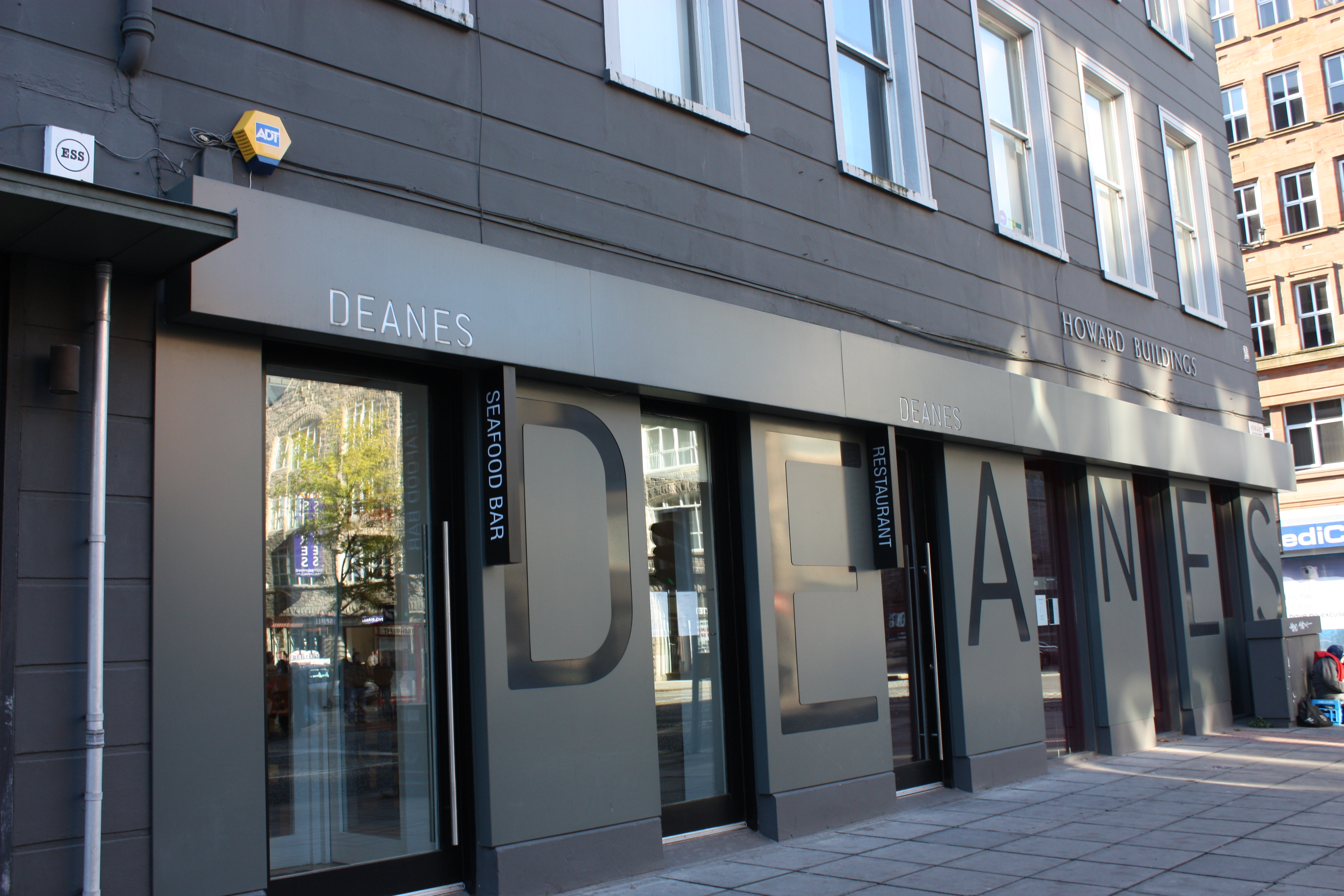
- Interactive map of Deanes Restaurants

Restaurant information
- Established: 1997
- Owner: Michael Deane
- Rating: Michelin Guide
- Location: 28-40 Howard Street, Belfast, County Antrim, Northern Ireland
- Website: https://www.michaeldeane.co.uk

Deanes is a restaurant located in Belfast, Northern Ireland with a European kitchen style. It is a fine dining restaurant that was awarded a Michelin star for each year in the period 1998–2010.

It lost its star in 2011 due to severe frost damage in 2010, that forced a temporary closure of the restaurant, just in the period the inspections for the next year's guide were to take place.

Its predecessor Deanes on the Square held a Michelin star in 1997.

The executive chef is Michael Deane and the head chef is Simon Toye.

== Gallery ==
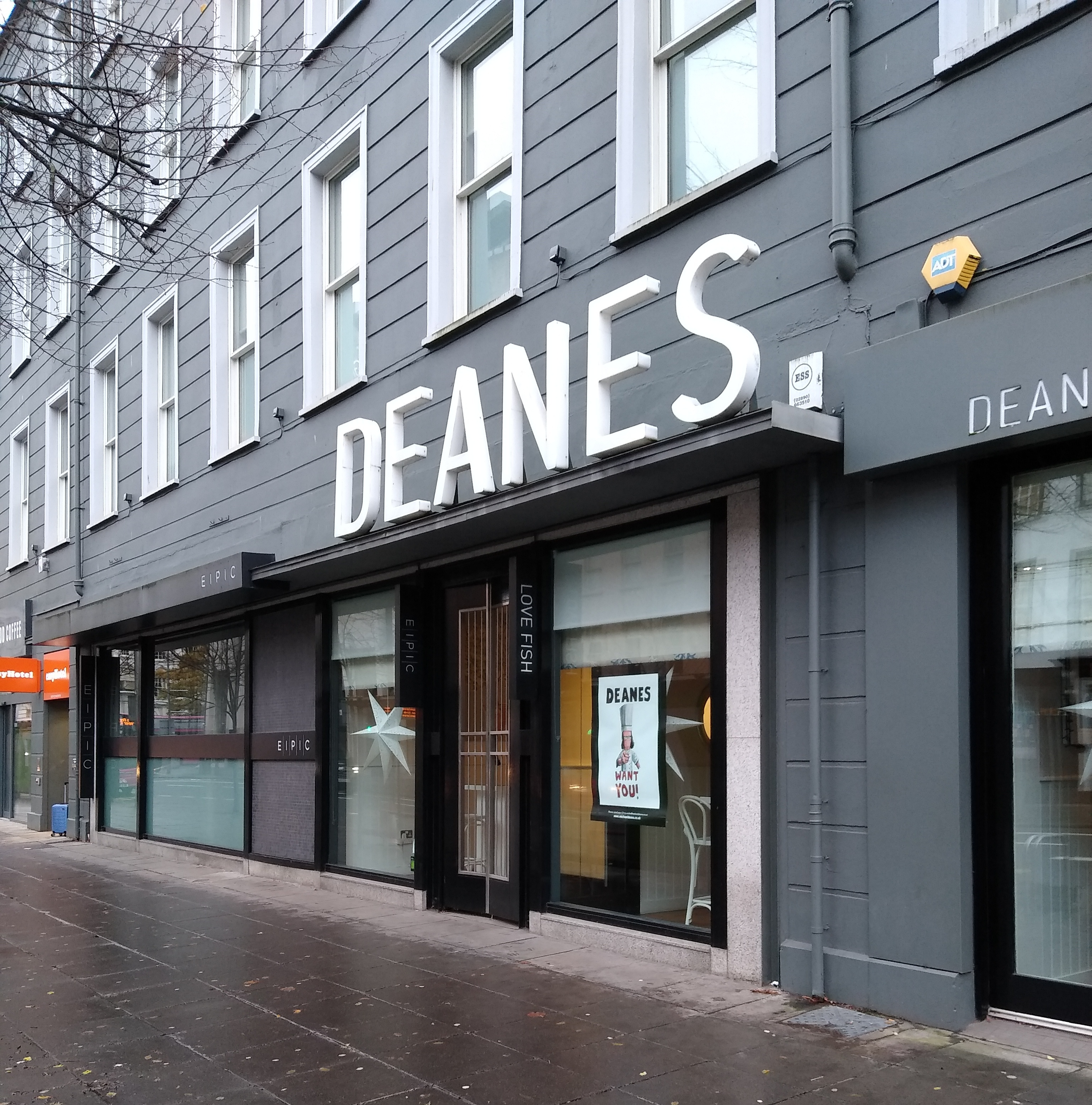
Exterior

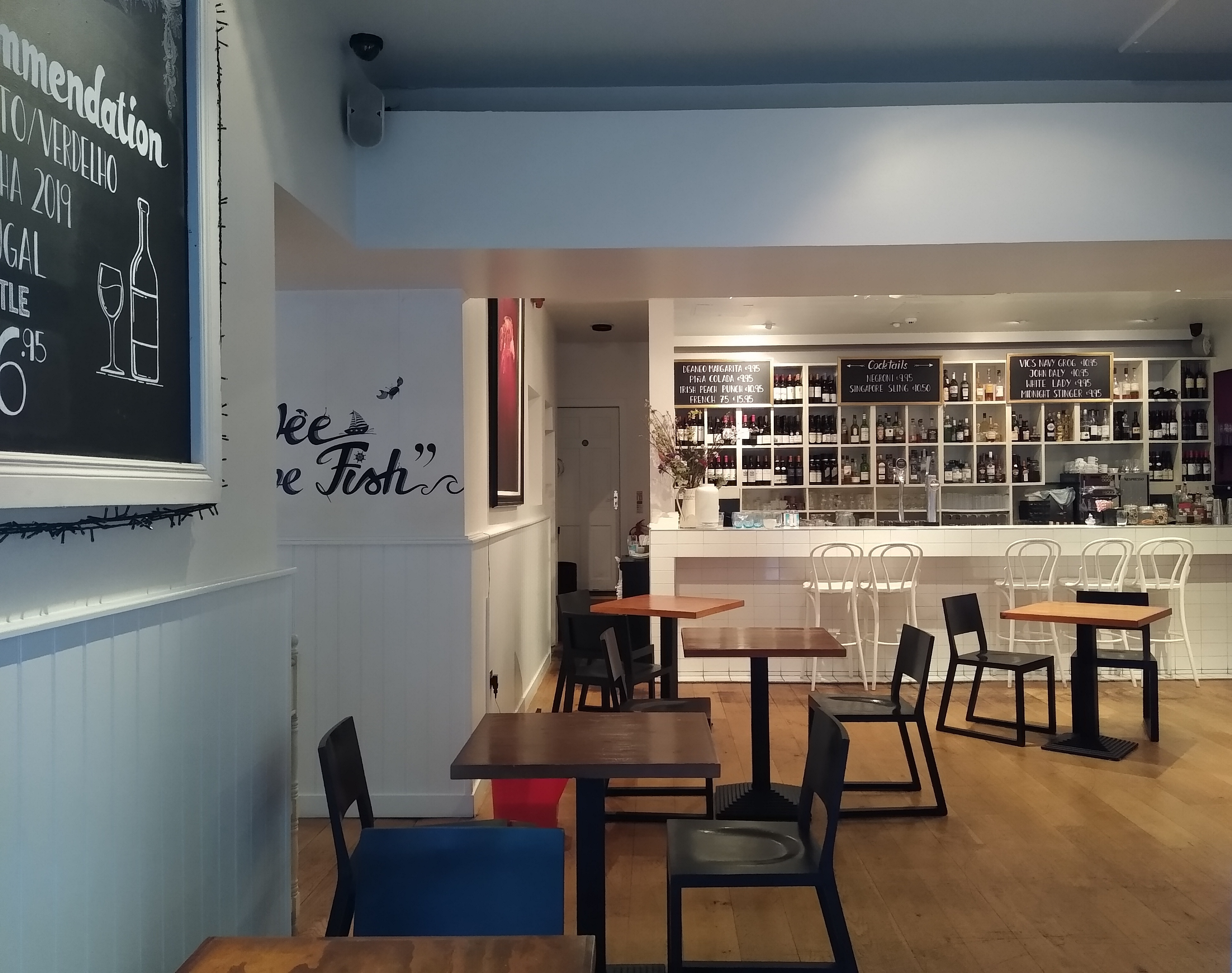
Interior

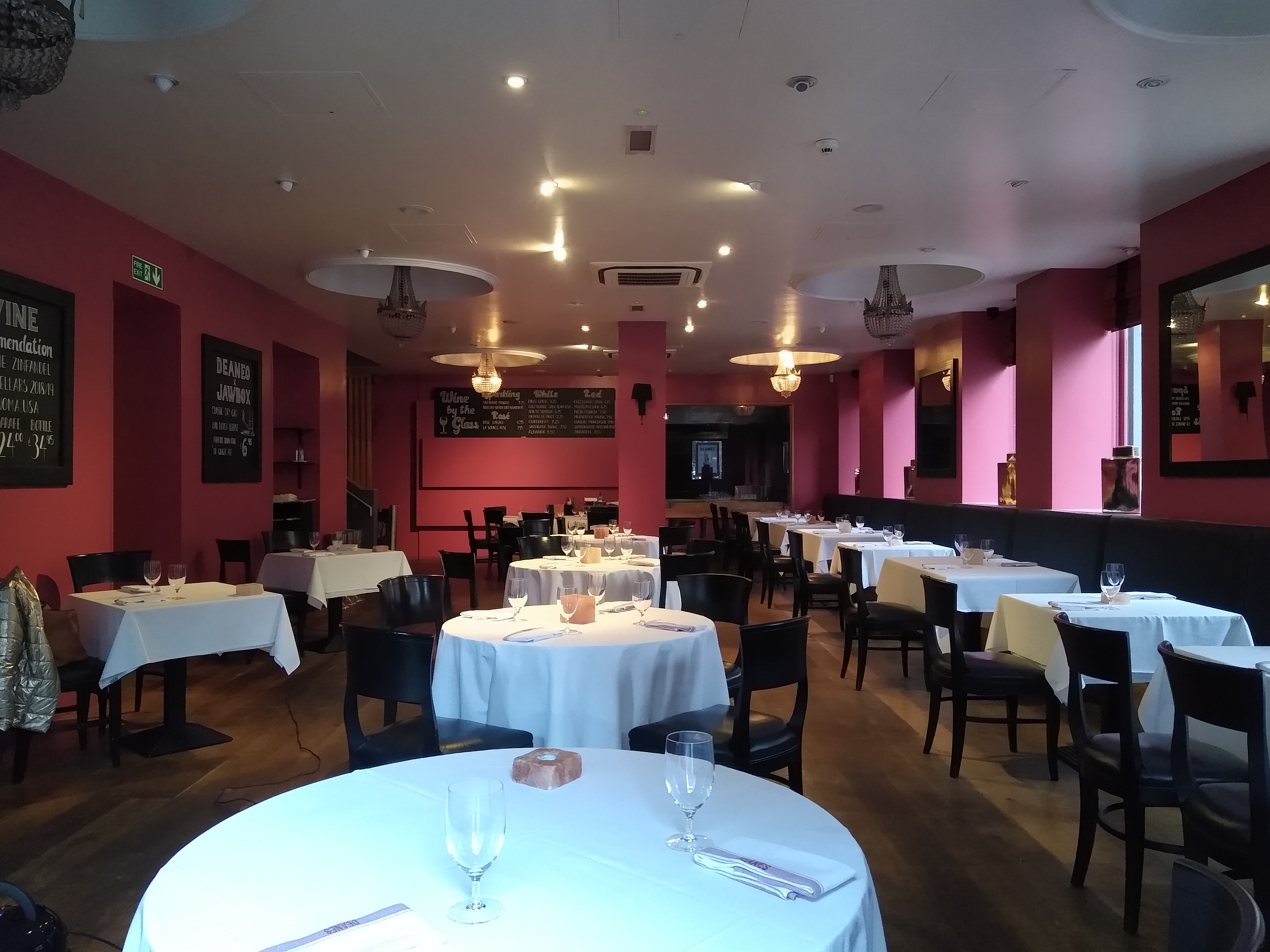
Interior

== See also ==
- List of Michelin-starred restaurants in Northern Ireland
