= Paul Rankin =

Northern Ireland chef (born 1959)

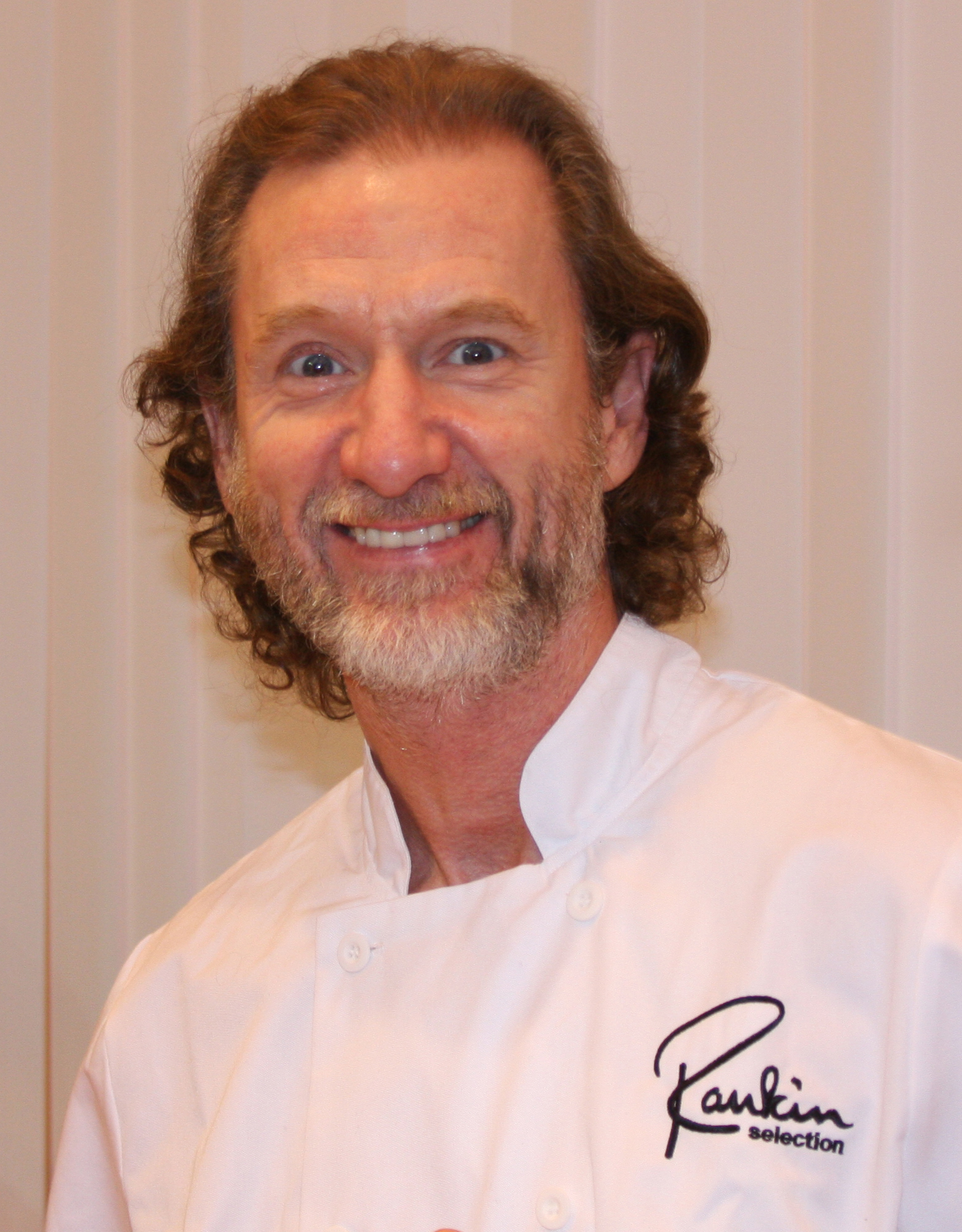
- Rankin at The Good Food Show in 2011
- Born: 1 October 1959 (age 66); Glasgow, Scotland

Paul Rankin (born 1 October 1959 in Glasgow, Scotland) is a British celebrity chef. He lives in Ballywalter, County Down, Northern Ireland. Rankin's parents moved back to Ballywalter, where he grew up, some time after he was born. This was stated when he was the subject of an episode of a short programme named Proud Parents on Channel 4, made in 2006.

== Career ==
In 1989 Paul Rankin opened Roscoff, the restaurant that was to become the first to win a Michelin Star in Northern Ireland. Soon after opening, it became the favourite meeting place for the Belfast business and arts community, and people travelled from Dublin simply to experience what was considered to be the best cooking in Northern Ireland at the time. Forced by financial difficulties, Rankin sold the restaurant in 2005. The building is now occupied by restaurant CoCo.

Many chefs and head chefs, such as Dylan McGrath, Michael Deane and Robbie Millar, received part of their training there.

In 2009 it was reported that Rankin had sold most of the Rankin Group to cover business debts, leaving only the flagship Cayenne restaurant under his control, although this too was under negotiation as part of an IVA. This IVA was successful and bankruptcy was avoided. However, the restaurant finally closed on Sunday 24 March 2013 with Rankin citing the economic climate and disruptive protests in the city as being two of the reasons for the closure.

The late Robbie Millar made his name while working at Roscoff.

=== Television appearances ===
His first foray into television was in the series Gourmet Ireland, produced by Irish company Waddell Productions, and shown on both BBC and RTE. Both Paul and Jeanne starred in the programme. Jeanne, a successful pastry chef, was a regular on the BBC cookery programme Ready Steady Cook. In 1999 Rankin was the first chef from Northern Ireland to be awarded a Michelin Star. He has written five cookery books and ran The Rankin Group chain of restaurants and cafés, including Cayenne and Roscoff in Belfast. His Canadian wife Jeanne introduced him to cooking and is co-owner of their business.

In 2006 Rankin competed in the Northern Ireland heat of the BBC's Great British Menu, a competition to cook for the Queen on her 80th birthday.

In 2006, Rankin appeared on The X Factor: Battle of the Stars, along with fellow chefs Jean-Christophe Novelli, Aldo Zilli and Ross Burden. He has also appeared on the TV programme Put Your Money Where Your Mouth Is.

=== Food products ===
In 2002, Irwin's Bakery launched the Rankin Selection range of Irish bread, in partnership with Rankin. The first products were stocked by Waitrose, later becoming available in other supermarkets across the UK and Ireland. As of 2015, the range included soda bread, potato farls, and barmbrack. In 2021, the products were rebranded as Irwin's Together and no longer bear Rankin's name.

Rankin Selection also extended to pork sausages, produced by the Northern Irish manufacturer Finnebrogue. Rankin supported a campaign to keep Finnebrogue's venison factory open when it was threatened with closure, saying it was "world class and something for Northern Ireland to be proud of".

== Awards ==
- Outstanding Contribution to the Hospitality Industry Award

== Personal life ==
Paul and Jeanne Rankin were married for more than 25 years. Their marriage ended amicably in 2011.

Paul Rankin and Jeanne met in the 1980s, while working in Le Gavroche, a notable restaurant in London. He started there as a dishwasher, while she started as a waitress. Soon they were moved into the kitchen and started their kitchen career.

A riding accident left her in constant pain and ended her career as pastry chef. In September 2005 Jeanne publicly acknowledged that she had been heavily dependent upon morphine and other prescription drugs following the accident and had sought help in rehabilitation.

In August 2012, Rankin spoke about the devastating effects of Alzheimer's disease. He revealed that his father is suffering from the disease and no longer recognises him.

== Books ==
- Hot Food (1997)
- Gourmet Ireland (1997)
- Gourmet Ireland 2 (1998)
- Ideal Home Cooking (1998)
- New Irish Cookery (2005)
- Steps 2 work programme
