= Roscoff Restaurant =

Coordinates: 54°35′43.06″N 5°55′47.91″W

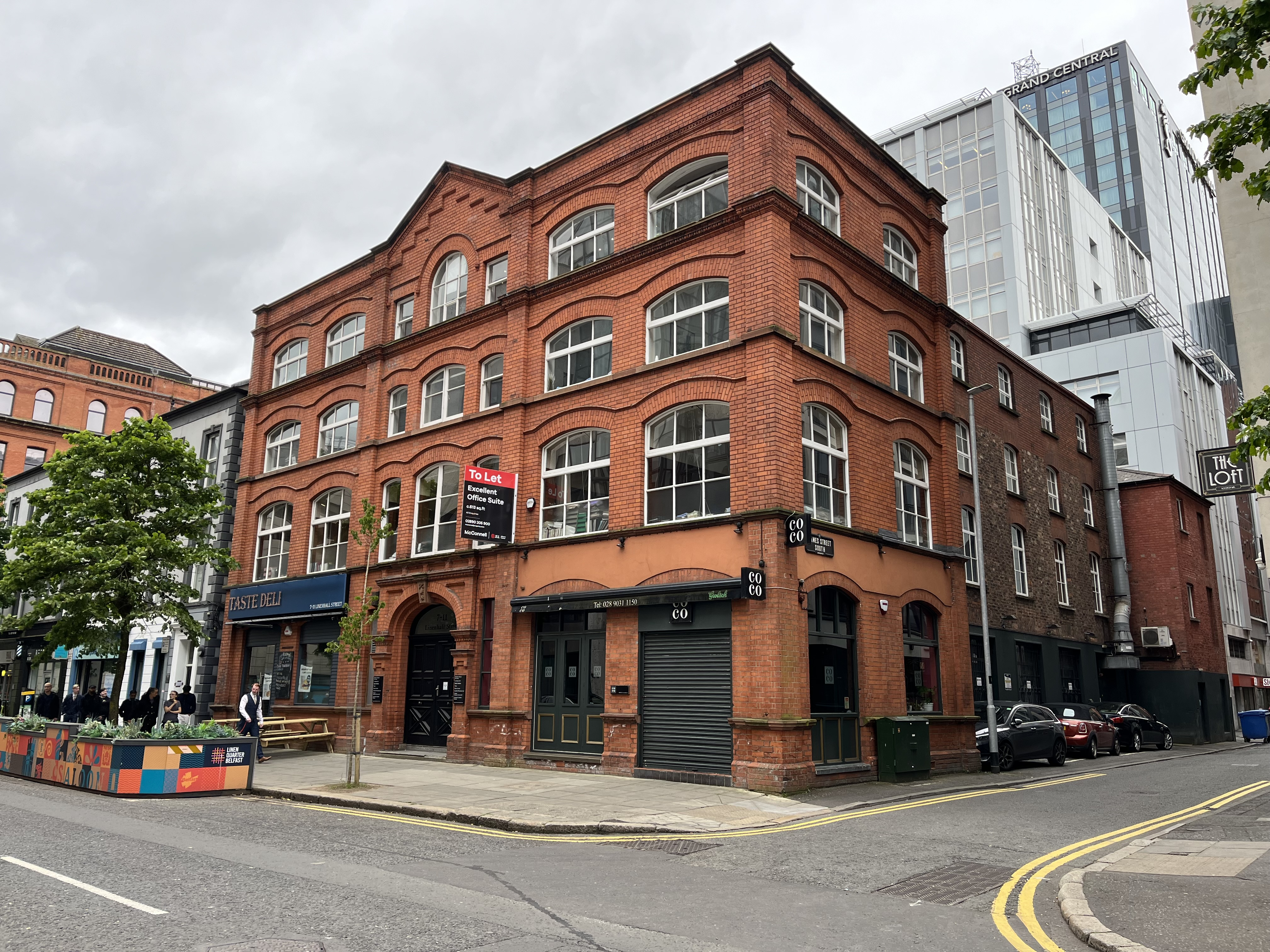
- Location where Roscoff Restaurant used to be located
- Interactive map of Roscoff Restaurant

Restaurant information
- Established: 1984
- Head chef: Paul Rankin
- Rating: Michelin Guide
- Location: 7-11 Linenhall Street, Belfast, Northern Ireland

Roscoff Restaurant was a restaurant in 7 Ascot House, Shaftesbury Square, Belfast, Northern Ireland. It was a fine dining restaurant that was awarded one Michelin star in 1991 and retained that rating until 1998.

Restaurant Roscoff was established in 1984 under the name Roscoff. Some years later, after the addition of other eateries to the Paul Rankin Group, the name was changed to Roscoff Restaurant.

In 1991 the Michelin Guide awarded its first Michelin star in Northern Ireland to head chef Paul Rankin. Roscoff and Rankin were highly influential on the contemporary culinary world in the Republic of Ireland and Northern Ireland. Many chefs and head chefs, such as Dylan McGrath, Michael Deane and Robbie Millar, have received part of their training there.

Forced by financial difficulties, Rankin sold the restaurant in 2005. The building is now occupied by restaurant CoCo.

== Awards ==
Besides the Michelin star awarded by the Michelin Guide it has also claimed several other awards:

- BBC Good Food Award 1996

== See also ==
- List of Michelin-starred restaurants in Northern Ireland
