= Barry Smyth (academic) =

Computer scientist

- Known for: Research on case-based recommendation and personalization
- Awards: Science Foundation Ireland Researcher of the Year (2014)
- Scientific career
- Fields: Artificial intelligence, Recommender systems, Case-based reasoning, Personalization
- Workplaces: University College Dublin

Barry Smyth is a computer scientist and professor at University College Dublin. Smyth's research focuses on artificial intelligence, case-based reasoning, and recommender systems. He was a founding director of the Insight Centre for Data Analytics.

== Research and career ==
Starting out in case-based reasoning, Smyth's early work focused on its use in intelligent computer systems.

In 1999, he co-founded ChangingWorlds, commercializing his research in personalization and recommendation for mobile services. In 2008. the company was acquired by Amdocs. In 2009, he co-founded the Web 2.0 company HeyStaks, which developed collaborative technologies for search and recommendation.

== Recognition ==
Smyth is an elected Fellow of the European Association for Artificial Intelligence since 2003 and, since 2011, a member of the Royal Irish Academy.

His contribution to research and research commercilization was awarded the Science Foundation Ireland Researcher of the Year award in 2014. He also received an honorary doctorate from Robert Gordon University in the same year.
