= Paul F. Miller =

American sculptor

Paul Franklin Miller Jr.
- Born: January 23, 1932; Roanoke, Virginia
- Died: March 29, 2012 (aged 80)
- Education: Richmond Professional Institute
- Known for: Sculptor
- Notable work: Sculptures displayed throughout New York City

Paul Franklin Miller Jr. (January 23, 1932 – March 29, 2012) was an American sculptor, art educator, and the creator of numerous art innovations. Miller was educated at Richmond Professional Institute, where he studied Abstract Expressionism. While studying, he spent his summers in Provincetown, where he was greatly influenced by his mentor and tutor, Hans Hoffman.

A pivotal change in Miller's art career came when he began welding. His welds focused on symmetrical designs, which he became known for throughout his career as an artist. Miller's symmetrical art style is represented in his sculpture, videography and printmaking.

His welding art was best known for the wall sculptures he created using thousands of brass welds, which most resemble crocheting in gold. In order to create the most accurate art from a symmetrical perspective, Miller and 2 physicists developed a device they named the Symmetricon. This allowed him to photograph sculptures and generate an almost limitless number of kaleidoscopic designs. Miller would then choose the designs he preferred and archive them as models for his sculptures. Miller also used his Symmetricon to create Kaleidoscopic Archival Ink Prints and a video using objects from nature transformed into symmetrical designs.

Miller also used an electroplating process, while experimenting with myriad materials from bone to vegetables, even growing jewelry with gold or silver over knotted strings. A tribe of small pre-human figures, 5 to 10 inches tall, were first plated in copper or silver. He then scaled these to be up to 9 ft tall.

Miller also taught at the Stevens Institute of Technology (SIT).

== Early life ==
Miller was born in Roanoke, Virginia on January 23, 1932. He was born to Daisy Bell Miller and Paul Franklin Miller Sr. His mother worked as a schoolteacher, while his father was a retail executive.

Miller was influenced by art from a young age, with his mother taking an interest in crafts, painting, and pottery. His father, who was a musician, also influenced him. Miller also played in the school band before becoming a regular in the local country club dance band.

== Life and career ==
After finishing high school, Miller enlisted in the U.S. Air Force and became a member of the Air Force Band. He was based in Wiesbaden, Germany. The band became a renowned touring band in Europe at the time, playing in numerous countries while Miller was a member. During his spare time with the band, Miller would frequently visit museums, art galleries, and royal palaces in various European countries.

Following his time in Europe, Miller enrolled in Richmond Professional Institute (RPI), later known as Virginia Commonwealth University. RPI was known at the time for a focus on art, which was one of the main reasons Miller chose it. While studying in Virginia, Miller traveled each summer to Provincetown to learn more about Abstract Expressionism. He studied under the well-known Abstract Expressionist, Hans Hoffman. While in Provincetown, Miller mixed and socialized with New York artists including Zoot Sims, Jerry Mulligan and Norman Mailer.

On his return to RPI for his next year of study, Miller became intrigued with torch and welding. As he developed his skills, many commented on the accuracy of his welds and how few artists could match the flawlessness of his bronze sculptures. Miller went on to study for a master's degree. Following his education, Miller moved to New York City to pursue a career in art and Abstract Expressionism.

Shortly after arriving in New York City, Miller became the Artist-in-Residence at Stevens Institute of Technology (SIT), where he taught drawing, painting, and sculpture. In his spare time, Miller continued as a professional sculptor, videographer, and printmaker. For 25 years, Miller taught art and advocated exposure to it. He lectured on art and technology or symmetry in venues such as the New York Academy of Science, the American Society of Electrical Engineers, and a national convention of metal workers and welders, whose directors wanted members to see Miller's welds, which most resembled crocheting.

Miller was a consultant for collaborative sculpture workshops and a lecturer on the work of Alexander Calder, who graduated from SIT in 1919. He was a judge of various art shows, including the Asian Indian Show in 1980. Miller was the graphic set designer for Lunar LTD Film Company. Miller's wall sculptures and outsized standing figures were commissioned by New York City financial institutions, churches, synagogues, the Stevens Library, Stevens Center, and the private collection of Robert Graves.

== Works ==
In 1958, Miller was studying Abstract Expressionism with Hans Hoffman, but decided he wanted to move into bronze welding after taking a welding class. As he honed his skills, he began to create more sophisticated designs. He focused initially on wall sculptures for banks or ceremonial objects for churches and synagogues. In the late 1960s, Miller taught art at Virginia Polytechnic Institute.

He then went on to teach art at Pace University before accepting the position of Artist-in-Residence at Stevens Institute of Technology. Miller pioneered art studies, creating the first ever Art & Technology curriculum. Over a 20-year period at SIT, his work took various forms, from sculpture and kaleidoscopic prints to videography. All of his works focused heavily on symmetry.

A monumental concrete statue stands in the grounds of Stevens Institute of Technology, which was designed by Miller and created by four engineering students. Jim Lloyd, a former student of Miller's, was interviewed about his way of teaching. He stated, "I want 10 paintings in 10 minutes. People wouldn't know what to do with that, but almost every student would turn out at least one thing that was pretty good. It worked." Lloyd added, "Miller wasn't the kind of guy who would tell you what to do. He would just sit there and by osmosis you'd know, yeah, that's not what he's looking for and that not what I should be doing. Or, occasionally, yeah, I got it right."

=== Sculptures ===
Miller first welded symmetrical objects that were small enough to be worn as jewelry pendants. The designs were said to be simple and crudely executed. He would begin his designs by creating symmetrical doodles on paper, before turning them into symmetrical sculptures. As his skills improved, his works became more delicate, and he often worked with bronze. Each sculpture focused on one type of symmetry; often either vertical or horizontal.

During the period when Miller was developing his style, he became interested in and influenced by Taotie masks, which were often created in bronze. The ancient Chinese mask motifs were reflected in Miller's work, as many of Miller's works contain mask motifs. Another common design of the sculptures is that they included shapes, such as squares and circles, sharing the same center point.

Miller was known for his varied use of sculptural techniques, experimenting with several modes of creation. He used copper electroforming to create some sculptures with the help of a metallurgist. He was said to be attracted to electroforming due to advantages it had over the traditional lost-wax casting process. With this process, he experimented with forming silver or copper skins over everything from bones, to gourds, to knotted strings. The strings themselves would be translated into intricate rings or earrings, in beautiful electroplated filigree jewelry.

He created many miniature figures, including dozens of little creatures. As his skills improved, he changed from using clay to metal. The size of the sculptures also grew in size, growing the miniatures into 3 ft to 9 ft sculptures.

Miller was known for the intricate welds he would perform on the massive wall hangings he created. Four thousand welds in a wall hanging weren't uncommon for him. A single piece took as long as three years to complete.

=== Symmetricon kaleidoscopic projector ===
Miller created a kaleidoscopic projector named the Symmetricon, along with technical assistance from 2 physicists. The Symmetricon can produce countless symmetrical configurations as stimulations for Miller's wall sculptures. A 35mm slide of one of Miller's sculptures was placed in the Symmetricon. A section of the art was selected and projected in 4-fold symmetry on a screen; in other words, it was projected as a virtual sculpture long before computers made this possible. Miller kept the designs he liked and filed them for future use. An important feature of the Symmetricon was how it supplemented Miller's imagination, making a gamut of design possibilities accessible to him.

=== Electronic dimmer for the viewing of art ===
When Miller began making welded sculptures that possessed intricate geometric designs within a circular norm, he soon noticed that a slight change in the viewer's vantage point produced a dramatic difference in the appearance of the art object. Miller found he could duplicate this experience by providing alternating directions of illumination. Miller presented the challenge to 2 of his engineering students, Richard Szmauz and Richard Taborek. They developed an automatic electronic device that caused light to be produced from 2 sources alternately at predetermined intervals, thus providing Miller's desired artistic effect.

=== Symmetrical prints ===
Miller's work evolved apace with technology; he turned the eye of the Symmetricon onto nature. The result was a series of digital prints using archival ink on canvas. This series was featured in a one-man show at the Anderson Gallery in Manhattan.

=== Videography ===
Paul's wife, Nancy, observed that viewers of the kaleidoscope art project came away blissfully drowsy. Not good for art, but wonderful for the body and mind. Thus was born, Journey: A Kaleidoscopic Trip to Inner Peace. It was composed of 2–15 minute videos of Miller's kaleidoscopic images along with the sounds of nature, bird calls, wind chimes,s and waterfalls. Miller generated kaleidoscopic art using butterfly markings and croton leaves as subjects. The proof of nature's effect on healing is well established and possibly explains why Journey was a staple in catalogs providing wellness media to hospitals, as well as that of The Discovery Channel.

== Collections ==
Miller has a number of large wall sculptures hanging in New York City banks, churches, and synagogues. He also has work displayed at the SIT Library and SIT Gardens as well as the collection of Robert Graves.
