= Sayoko Ozaki =

Japanese fashion model (born 1989)

- 尾崎 紗代子
- Born: 20 December 1989 (age 36); Aichi Prefecture, Japan
- Other name: Osayo (おさよ)
- Modeling information
- Height: 160 cm (5 ft 3 in) (2012)
- Agency: info@osayoworks.com

Sayoko Ozaki (尾崎 紗代子, Ozaki Sayoko; born 20 December 1989 in Aichi Prefecture) is a Japanese fashion model. In the past she belonged to the agency Starray Production, and is currently a free agent. She is mainly known as featuring in the magazine Happie Nuts.

== Biography ==
Sayoko started off her career by modeling for Egg magazine from 2007 to 2009. While working as an employee of Shibuya 109's "Lip Service", she became an exclusive model of the magazine Happie Nuts. Her first solo cover in the magazine was the April issue of 2010. In 2012, she took part in the fashion show Tokyo Girls Collection.

Together with models Kozue Akimoto and Misaki Izuoka in 2013, she joined the fashion brand "Sly Lang".

In 2014, her Happie Nuts career ended with the discontinuation of the magazine.

== Private life ==
Ozaki grew up in Nagoya and at sixteen years old moved to Tokyo to her second year high school. Later she attended university in parallel to her modeling career.

== Television appearances ==
Date	Title	Network
1 Mar 2016	Konya kurabete mimashita	NTV
