= Alexander Miller (merchant) =

Alexander Miller was a Scottish merchant who was principal shareholder Miller Brothers along with his brother, George Miller. The firm was one of the four companies trading up the Niger River that merged to form the Royal Niger Company which held a Royal charter in the territories constituting most of Northern Nigeria Protectorate. After the merger, he became joint managing director and moved his offices from Glasgow to London.

== Business career ==
=== Miller Brothers ===
Miller established his trading firm, Alexander Miller, Brother and Co in 1868. The firm operated in Nigeria and in Gold Coast. In the 1870s, Miller Bros was among the few merchant firms that moved their trading activities up the Niger, into the interior of present-day Nigeria. To bypass the coastal middlemen, the firm purchased a steamship named Sultan of Sokoto. But in 1876, the ship came under heavy attack from the banks in a move suspected to have been initiated by Liverpool merchants and citizens of Brass, Nigeria who were opposed to Miller's desire to cut out the middlemen; opposition to Miller's entry into the interior forced the ship to become inoperable. But by 1879, Miller had a trading post up the Niger. In 1879, the European firms with trading activities on the area merged to form the National African Company, later known as the Royal Niger Company. The new firm held a charter to operate in the territories of Northern Nigeria. Miller was appointed a joint managing director of the company. Before joining the Royal Niger co, Miller was a man of means and his appointment as a managing director was due in part to his business acumen more than his equity in the firm.

On the coast, the trading activities of his firm were closely linked to Jaja of Opobo and the firm was sometimes derided as 'agents of Jaja's by other European firms that later constituted the African Association. The Miller brothers were detached from other Liverpool firms operating in the Oil Rivers, in the 1880s, the European firms quarreled in a case concerning Jaja. Jaja opposed the fixing of prices by the merchant firms, a move supported by the agent of Miller Bros, Jaja then went on to undercut the European monopoly by exporting to Europe while controlling trade with his agents in the hinterland. The Millers were successful during this period as they had easier access to procure produce from the interior through middlemen like Jaja. When Jaja was deported, the firm moved its base to Calabar and secured a beach front in the form of gin exchange or 'comey' consisting 20 cases of gin per year. The firm's support of Jaja also enhanced their reputation among African middlemen and the firm increased its presence in the Oil Rivers Protectorate and later moved into the timber and rubber trade. In 1889, the firm was again indifferent to the activities of the other European firms in the Oil Rivers who wanted to merge and obtain a charter to operate with monopoly powers in the Oil Rivers. The firm's aloofness to the merger reduced the possibility of a monopoly in the region.

In 1917, the firm merged with a few others to form the African & Eastern Trade Corporation.
