= Yutaka Ozaki =

Japanese musician (1965–1992)

Yutaka Ozaki 尾崎 豊
- Ozaki on the cover of his album Gairojyū (1988)

Background information
- Born: 29 November 1965; Setagaya, Tokyo, Japan
- Died: 25 April 1992 (aged 26) Tokyo, Japan
- Genres: Rock
- Occupation: Singer-songwriter
- Years active: 1983–1992
- Labels: CBS Sony (1983–1986, 1988–1992); Mother & Children (1987–1988)

Yutaka Ozaki (尾崎 豊, Ozaki Yutaka; November 29, 1965 – April 25, 1992) was a Japanese singer-songwriter. His hit debut single "Jūgo no Yoru" and debut album Jūnanasai no Chizu were released in 1983. He died in 1992 at the age of 26.

== Biography ==
=== Early life ===
Ozaki was born at Japan Self-Defense Forces Central Hospital in Setagaya, Tokyo, to Kinue and Kenichi Ozaki. He had one older brother, Yasushi. Early in life, he was hospitalized with intestinal torsion and bronchitis which subsequently weakened his internal organs. In 1973 he began studying martial arts and continued training throughout his life. In January 1975 he began playing piano and in March of that year, he wrote his first poem. His first live performance was in 1978 at his school's cultural festival.

=== Career ===
Ozaki was discovered by producer Akira Sudo and signed to CBS Sony in 1983. He debuted in December 1983 while he was still attending high school with his hit single "Jūgo no Yoru" (15の夜; "A night at Fifteen") and his album Seventeen's Map (十七歳の地図, Jū-nana-sai no Chizu; literal translation: "The Map of a Seventeen Year Old"). He gained tremendous support from his younger fanbase with his devastating live performances along with his unique lyrics that expressed dreams and love or the meaning of life. He represented the angst of adolescence, and a lot of the times attacked what he felt was unfair in society or schools.

=== Death ===
On April 25, 1992, Ozaki was found naked, drunk and unconscious in a Tokyo residential site. He was taken by ambulance but was soon dismissed from the hospital. He died several hours later. The cause of death was reported as pulmonary edema but many theories have arisen as to the actual cause of death, the most popular being homicide. Stimulants were detected in his body. He was survived by his wife, Shigemi, and his son, Hiroya Ozaki.

== Tribute covers ==
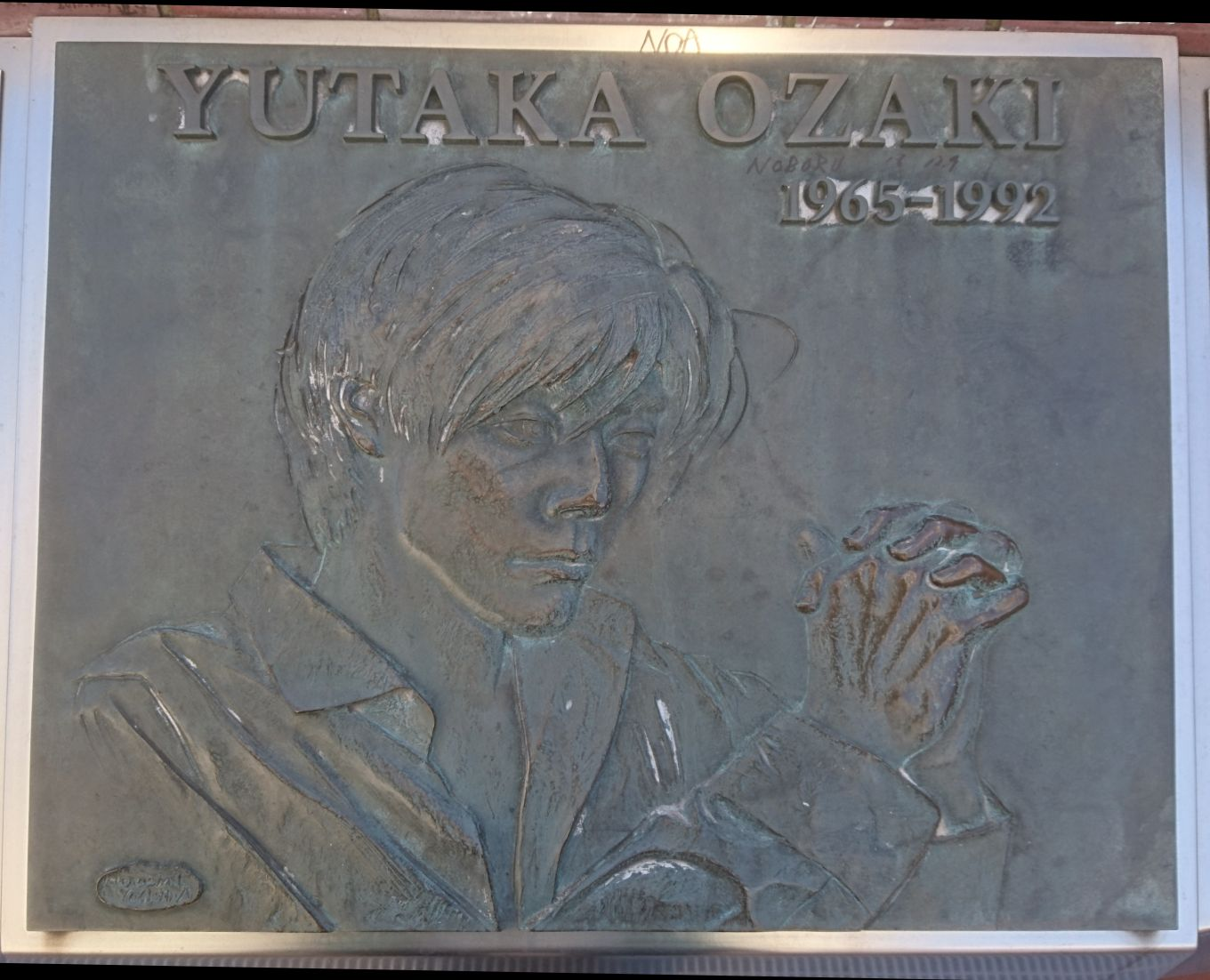
Ozaki's relief at Shibuya Cross Tower in Shibuya, Tokyo.

Thelma Aoyama, Akina Nakamori, Mika Nakashima, Kazumasa Oda, Ryuichi Kawamura, Hikaru Utada, Ayaka, Kobukuro, Tsuyoshi Domoto, Kyogo Kawaguchi and many other Japanese artists have covered Ozaki's song, "I Love You".

American singer-songwriter Debbie Gibson recorded an English-language cover of "I Love You" in her 2010 album Ms. Vocalist. In addition, American guitarist Marty Friedman recorded an instrumental cover of "I Love You" in his 2011 album Tokyo Jukebox 2.

Nanase Aikawa, Goto Maki, MINMI and Tomiko Van have covered "Oh My Little Girl". Shunsuke Kiyokiba also has covered two of his songs, "Taiyou no Hahen" (太陽の破片; "Fragments of the Sun") and "Futatsu no Kokoro" (ふたつの心; "Two Hearts"). Shimizu Shota covered his song, "Forget-Me-Not" and Mr. Children has covered "Boku ga Boku de Aru tame ni" (僕が僕であるために; "Me to Being Me") on "ap' bank fes. 2010".

In 2013, K-pop artist and main vocalist of Big Bang, Daesung (known in Japan as "D-Lite") covered "I Love You" and it was used as the theme song for the drama I Love You.

In 2014, Tamai Shiroi of Momoiro Clover Z, sang a cover of "Graduation" for a special concert.

== Discography ==
=== Singles ===
- "Jūgo no Yoru" - The Night (15の夜, 1983)
- "Jūnanasai no Chizu" - Seventeen's Map (十七歳の地図, 1984)
- "Hajimari-sae Utaenai" - Can't Sing Even the Beginning (はじまりさえ歌えない, 1984)
- "Sotsugyou" - Graduation (卒業, 1985)
- "Driving All Night" (1985)
- "Kaku" - Core (核, 1987)
- "Taiyō no Hahen" - Scratch of the Sun(太陽の破片, 1988)
- "Love Way" (1990)
- "Tasogare-yuku Machi-de" - 57th Street (黄昏ゆく街で, 1990)
- "Eien no Mune" - Eternal Heart (永遠の胸, 1991)
- "I Love You" (1991)
- "Kegareta Kizuna" - Bond (汚れた絆, 1992)
- Oh My Little Girl (1994) – posthumously released

=== Albums ===
- Jūnanasai no Chizu - Seventeen's Map (十七歳の地図, 1983)
- Kaikisen - Tropic of Graduation (回帰線, 1985)
- Kowareta Tobira kara - Through the Broken Door (壊れた扉から, 1985)
- Gairojū - Trees Lining a Street (街路樹, 1988)
- Tanjou - Birth (誕生, 1990)
- Hounetsu e no Akashi - Confession for Exist (放熱への証, 1992)

=== Compilations ===
- Aisu-beki Mono Subete-ni - For All My Loves (愛すべきものすべてに, 1996)
- Artery & Vein – The Very Best of Yutaka Ozaki (1999)
- 13/71 – The Best Selection (2004)

=== Live albums ===
- Last Teenage Appearance – The Myth of Yutaka Ozaki (1987)
- Yakusoku no Hi Vol.1 – The Day vol.1 (約束の日 Vol.1, 1993)
- Yakusoku no Hi Vol.2 – The Day vol.2 (約束の日 Vol.2, 1993)
- Missing Boy (1997)
- Osaka Stadium on August 25 in 1985 Vol.1 (1998)
- Osaka Stadium on August 25 in 1985 Vol.2 (1998)

== Movie ==
A 2011 TV-drama called Kaze no Shounen portrayed his life and in depth early career, from meeting his manager Sudo to his death. He was played by Hiroki Narimiya.
