= Paul Millar =

Paul Millar may refer to:

- Paul Millar (footballer, born 1966), Northern Irish footballer and manager
- Paul Millar (Scottish footballer) (born 1988), player for Elgin City

== See also ==
- Paul Miller (disambiguation)
