= Snellville Days Festival =

Snellville Days
- Dates: First Saturday & Sunday in May
- Location: Snellville, GA
- Years active: 1974–2019, 2022–
- Website: http://www.snellvilledays.com/

The Snellville Days Festival is a two-day event held annually in Snellville, Georgia that draws crowds from all over the Southeast. The annual celebration is touted as one of the top 20 tourism events in May according to the Southeastern Tourism Society, but still holds that small town flavor. Snellville Days was voted "Best of Gwinnett" in 2012.

== History ==
The first Snellville Days festival, held in 1974, was originally planned and organized by Jean Braley and the Morales as a one-time event to help raise funds to develop T. W. Briscoe Park as a community gathering place but city officials found the response to be so overwhelming that they decided to make it an annual event. The two-day event has since grown to become one of the greatest craft and community festivals in the Atlanta area.

The old parade route followed U.S. Hwy. 78, but was changed in more recent years due to increased traffic volume. The route went down Wisteria Drive from US 78, left on North Road, then left on Oak Road, ending at City Hall. In earlier years, the parade had grown so much that it lasted two hours; the parade has since purposefully been reduced to approximately an hour. The last Snellville Days Parade was 2015.

There has been no in 2020-21 caused by the COVID-19 pandemic.

== Planning ==
Planning and execution of the event is a year-long process undertaken by the city staff, the Snellville Days Committee, and a number of volunteers.

== Festivities at T.W. Briscoe Park ==
Festivities following the opening ceremonies once consisted of simple games such as dunking booths and local crafts and entertainment but have been greatly expanded to include hand-made arts and crafts from almost 100 vendors, live entertainment, food booths, a children's activity area, and beginning in 2006, a museum sponsored by the Snellville Historical Society. Sponsors and vendors have contributed to the success of the festival; along with numerous volunteers and staff.

== Themes and Grand Marshals by Year ==
Year	Theme	Grand Marshal
1974	Snellville Day Festival - first held as one-time event to raise money for improvements to Briscoe Park	Thomas W. Briscoe - former Snellville Mayor
1975	Pride in America	Ludlow Porch - radio talk show host and author
1976	Snellville Salutes America	Lt. Governor Zell Miller
1977	Fun & Fantasy	U.S. Senator Sam Nunn
1978	Snellville Salutes the 50s	Vince Dooley - Head Football Coach at the University of Georgia
1979	Walt Disney Theme	Ross and Wilson - Atlanta radio DJ's
1980	Salute to the American Cowboy	Clayton Moore - The Lone Ranger
1981	Snellville - Country and Proud of It!	Jerry Clower - Country Comedian
1982	Everybody is Somebody in Snellville	Sorrell Brooke - Boss Hogg on The Dukes of Hazzard
1983	Everybody is Somebody in Snellville	George Lindsey - Goober on The Andy Griffith Show
1984	Everybody is Somebody in Snellville - Winning Stories	Tom T. Hall - "The Story Teller" Country Music Singer
1985	A Salute to American Heroes	Steve Lundquist - Olympic Gold Medalist Swimmer
1986	The Pride is Back	Bill Curry - Head Football Coach at Georgia Tech
1987	Snellville Salutes our Youth	Michael Damian - actor on The Young and the Restless
1988	Southern Charm	Charlie Daniels - Country Music Singer
1989	Through the Years	The Creel Sisters - known for their role in Parent Trap III
1990	Let Freedom Ring	Tom Wopat - actor in The Dukes of Hazzard
1991	Georgia on My Mind	Melly Meadows - official Scarlett O'Hara spokeswoman for United Artists
1992	Visions '92	Kim Hardee - Miss Georgia 1991; Scott Case - Football star for the Atlanta Falcons
1993	Let Us Entertain You	Jerry Reed - country music singer and actor in Smokey and the Bandit
1994	Snellville Welcomes the World	Georgia Governor Zell Miller
1995	Field of Dreams	South Gwinnett High School Girls Championship Basketball Team
1996	Snellville Welcomes the World	Jason Elam - Denver Broncos Placekicker
1997	Beach Party	1996 Brookwood High School AAAA Football Championship Team
1998	Welcome Home	1997 South Gwinnett High School AAAA Girls Fast Pitch Softball Team
1999	Year of the Athlete	Lex Luger & Buff Bagwell - WCW Wrestlers
2000	Snellville Salutes the American Hero	General Raymond G. Davis, USMC
2001	People Coming Together	Parkview High School AAAAA Football Championship Team
2002	Our American Spirit	Parade Cancelled Due to Rain
2003	Everybody's Somebody in Snellville - Celebrating 30 Years of Success	David Greene - Quarterback for the University of Georgia
2004	Our American Idols	Outstanding Representatives in Our Community from the areas of Education, Public Service and Business
2005	A Place to Call Home	Families Representing the Foster Parent Program and Diana DeGarmo - 2004 American Idol Runner-up
2006	Look At Us Now!	T. Graham Brown - Legendary Country Performer
2007	Welcome To Our Town, Honoring The Past	Kathryn Bird - Longest Living Snellville Native
2008	A One Time Event That's Lasted 35 Years	Vietnam War Veterans; Jim Freeman, Richard Chambers, John Hayes
2009	Today, Tomorrow, Forever	Kimberly Gittings - 2009 Miss Georgia USA
2010	Community First...Celebrating Jimmy & Mary Jane Gresham	Mary Jane Gresham and Donna Douglas (The Beverly Hillbillies)
2011	Bringing Families Together	Southeast Gwinnett Cooperative Ministry
In 2012 the themes applied to the parade only
2012	Proud to Be...	Jordan Rager of NBC's "The Voice"
2013-Parade and festival was rained out both days	Happy 40th Birthday, Snellville Days...	Louis Williams-Atlanta Hawks
2014	Dreams Do Come True	Rennie Curran-NFL player
2015	Super Heroes	Peyton Greene and Batman (Joseph Moran)
