= Paul Miller (author) =

- Education: University of Birmingham
- Occupations: Entrepreneur author
- Website: digitalworkplacegroup.com

Paul Miller is a UK-based digital consultant, author and social entrepreneur. He has founded several technology companies and as of 2011, is CEO of the Digital Workplace Group. His books have been nominated for the CMI Management Book of the Year Award.

== Biography ==
Miller was born and brought up in Manchester. After completing LLB from the University of Birmingham, he began his career as an editor and publisher of Wave magazine.

In 1992, Miller founded The Empowerment Group, a communication consultancy company. Miller founded the Digital Workplace Group in 2011, a consultancy company that offers services for intranet and digital workplace measurement and research. He also hosted the internet radio show Digital Workplace Live from 2012 to 2017. He hosts the podcast Digital Workplace Impact.

Miller was named world's Top 50 Social Employee Advocacy Leaders in 2015.

== Bibliography ==
- Miller, Paul; Janes, Shimrit (2021). Nature of Work: The new story of work for a living age. TECL Publishing. ISBN 9781838142209
- Miller, Paul; Marsh, Elizabeth (2014). The Digital Renaissance of Work: Delivering Digital Workplaces Fit for the Future. Gower. ISBN 9781472437211.
- Miller, Paul (2012). The Digital Workplace: How Technology Is Liberating Work. Dog Ear Publishing. ISBN 9781457510960.
