= Barry Smith (footballer, born 1934) =

English footballer

Personal information
- Full name: Barry Smith
- Date of birth: 15 April 1934
- Place of birth: South Kirkby, England
- Date of death: 2007 (aged 72–73)
- Position: Forward

Senior career*
Years	Team	Apps	(Gls)
	Farsley Celtic	?	(?)
1952–1953	Leeds United	2	(1)
1955–1957	Bradford Park Avenue	64	(38)
1957–1958	Wrexham	18	(10)
1958–1959	Stockport County	17	(4)
1959–1960	Headington United	?	(?)
1960–1961	Oldham Athletic	1	(0)
	Bangor City	?	(?)
	Southport	?	(?)
1961–1962	Accrington Stanley	?	(?)
Total		102	(53)
- * Club domestic league appearances and goals

Barry Smith (born 15 March 1934 – 2007) was an English footballer who played as a forward in the Football League.
