= Eipic (restaurant) =

Restaurant in Belfast, Northern Ireland

EIPIC
- Location within Greater Belfast

Restaurant information
- Established: 2014
- Owner: Michael Deane
- Head chef: Alex Greene
- Food type: Irish cuisine
- Rating: Michelin Guide
- Location: 28–40 Howard Street, Belfast, BT1 6PF, Northern Ireland
- Coordinates: 54.595727°N 5.932770°W
- Website: www.deaneseipic.com

Eipic (Irish: [ˈɛpʲɪc]; "epic"), styled as EIPIC, was a restaurant in Belfast, Northern Ireland. It was awarded a Michelin star in 2016 and retained that until its closure in 2023.

Head chef of EIPIC is Alex Greene. He took over from Danni Barry in late September 2017. The restaurant was closed in Autumn 2023, with owner Michael Deane citing price sensitivity among customers facing the cost-of-living crisis. The closure was reported as a "massive" loss to Belfast's culinary status.

== Awards ==
- Michelin star: 2016–2023

== See also ==
- List of Michelin-starred restaurants in Northern Ireland
