= Alex Miller (lobbyist) =

American businessman

Alexander Miller
- Born: October 11, 1922; Juneau, Alaska Territory
- Died: January 29, 1998 (age 75); Anchorage, Alaska
- Occupations: Lobbyist, politician, businessman
- Political party: Democratic

Alex Miller (October 11, 1922 – January 29, 1998) was an American political advisor and lobbyist active in Alaska. He was born in 1922 to Montenegrin Serb immigrants in Juneau, where he spent much of his life. Miller served as a Democratic National Committeeman and administrative assistant to William A. Egan, the first Governor. During Egan's administration, he was described as the most powerful lobbyist in Alaska.
