= Barry Smith (Australian footballer) =

Australian rules footballer

Personal information
- Full name: Barry Smith
- Born: 21 January 1939 (age 87)
- Original team: North Melbourne reserves
- Height: 178 cm (5 ft 10 in)
- Weight: 68 kg (150 lb)
- Position: Wing

Playing career^{1}
Years	Club	Games (Goals)
1960–1965	Footscray	78 (15)
- ^{1} Playing statistics correct to the end of 1965.

Barry Smith (born 21 January 1939) is a former Australian rules footballer who played for the Footscray Football Club in the Victorian Football League (VFL).
