= Paul Miller (American football coach) =

American football coach

Biographical details
- Born: c. 1950
- Education: Minnesota State–Mankato

Playing career
- c. 1970–1972: Minnesota–Morris

Coaching career (HC unless noted)
- 1980–1995: Apple Valley HS (MN)
- c. 1996: Minnesota (assistant)
- 1997–2001: St. Olaf
- 2005–2006: Hamline
- 2011: Minnesota–Crookston (OC)
- 2012: Minnesota–Crookston

Head coaching record
- Overall: 28–53 (college)

Paul Miller (born c. 1950) is an American former football coach. He served as the head football coach at St. Olaf College in Northfield, Minnesota (1997–2001), Hamline University in St. Paul, Minnesota (2005–2006), and the University of Minnesota, Crookston (2012), compiling a career college football coaching record of 28–53.

== Head coaching record ==
=== College ===
Year	Team	Overall	Conference	Standing	Bowl/playoffs
St. Olaf Oles (Minnesota Intercollegiate Athletic Conference) (1997–2001)
1997	St. Olaf	2–8	2–7	7th	
1998	St. Olaf	2–8	2–7	T–7th	
1999	St. Olaf	3–7	3–6	7th	
2000	St. Olaf	6–4	6–3	T–3rd	
2001	St. Olaf	6–4	5–4	5th	
St. Olaf:		20–30	19–27		
Hamline Pipers (Minnesota Intercollegiate Athletic Conference) (2005–2006)
2005	Hamline	3–7	1–7	T–8th	
2006	Hamline	3–7	1–7	T–8th	
Hamline:		6–14	2–14		
Minnesota–Crookston Golden Eagles (Northern Sun Intercollegiate Conference) (2012)
2012	Minnesota–Crookston	2–9	2–9 / 1–6	T–13th / T–6th (North)	
Minnesota–Crookston:		2–9	2–9		
Total:		28–53			
