= Derek Millar =

Burmese Scottish male singer

Derek Millar ဒဲရစ်မေလာ
- Born: 1962 (age 62–63); Burma
- Genres: Jazz; blues; pop
- Occupation: Singer-songwriter
- Instruments: Vocals; guitar
- Years active: 1983-present
- Website: Derek Millar on Facebook

Derek Millar (Burmese: ဒဲရစ်မေလာ; born 10 January 1962) is a Burmese-Scottish singer-songwriter and guitarist, known for his hit songs, "Thae Nu" (သည်းနု) and "A Blue Cafe" (အပြာရောင်ကော်ဖီဆိုင်).

== Early life and education ==
Millar was born in 1962 and was raised in Mingala Taungnyunt Township, Rangoon (now Yangon). He graduated from Rangoon University, majoring in physics. During his time, he befriended contemporaneous singer-songwriters, including Htoo Ein Thin and Khin Maung Toe.

== Career ==
Millar released his first album in 1983. In 1986, he released his second album, New Age Currents (ခေတ်သစ်ရေစီး), which included a hit song, "A Blue Cafe" that elevated him to fame. He composed songs in Wai La's 2019 album Cāritta (စာရိတ္တ).

== Discography ==
- New Age Currents (ခေတ်သစ်ရေစီး) (1996)
- Will Meet You Forever (အမြဲဆုံတွေ့မယ်) (1998)
- Kachalar Matikar (ကာချလာမာတိကာ) (2022)

== Personal life ==
Millar is of Scottish ancestry. He is married and has two children.
