= Let Freedom Ring (EP) =

EP by Hiroya Ozaki
- Released: 22 March 2017
- Genre: J-pop; alternative pop; adult contemporary
- Label: Toy's Factory
- Producer: Koichi Tsutaya; Junji Ishiwatari

Hiroya Ozaki chronology
Let Freedom Ring (2017)	Seize The Day (2017)

Singles from Let Freedom Ring
- 1. "Hajimari no Machi (始まりの街)" Released: September 5, 2016

Let Freedom Ring is the first extended play (EP) by Japanese singer and songwriter Hiroya Ozaki, released on 22 March 2017 by Toy's Factory.

Ozaki embarked on his first tour titled "Let Freedom Ring Tour 2017" in support of the EP.

== Track listing ==
CD and digital download
No.	Title	Writer(s)	Length
1.	"Someday Smile (サムデイ・スマイル)"	Hiroya Ozaki; Koichi Tsutaya; Junji Ishiwatari; SALU	4:47
2.	"27"	Ozaki; Tsutaya	4:06
3.	"Hajimari no Machi (始まりの街)" (Soul Feeling Mix)	Ozaki; Tsutaya	3:56
4.	"Stay by My Side"	Ozaki; Tsutaya; Ishiwatari	5:11
Total length:			17:58

Let Freedom Ring — Amazon exclusive edition (Disc two)
No.	Title	Writer(s)	Length
1.	"27 (starRo Remix)"	Ozaki; Tsutaya; starRo	3:52
Total length:			21:50

== Release history ==
Region	Date	Edition	Format	Label	Ref.
Japan	22 March 2017	Standard	CD; digital download	Toy's Factory	
Amazon exclusive	2CD				
