= Hiroya Ozaki =

Japanese musician

Hiroya Ozaki 尾崎 裕哉
- Also known as: Capeson
- Born: Ozaki Hiroya (尾崎 裕哉); 24 July 1989 (age 37)
- Origin: Tokyo, Japan
- Genres: J-pop; R&B; electronic
- Occupations: Singer; songwriter
- Instruments: Vocals; guitar
- Years active: 2004–present
- Labels: Toy's Factory; Tokyo Recordings; GettysBurg; SME
- Website: www.hiroyaozaki.com

Hiroya Ozaki (尾崎 裕哉, Ozaki Hiroya; born 24 July 1989) is a Japanese singer-songwriter.

== Early life and family ==
Ozaki was born on 24 July 1989 in Tokyo, Japan, to Japanese singer songwriter Yutaka Ozaki and Shigemi Ozaki. After his father, who was known as a legendary rock musician, died of pulmonary edema at the age of 26, Ozaki and his mother moved to Boston, United States.

== Career ==
=== 2004–2015: Pre-debut period ===
In March 2004, Ozaki covered his father's song "The Night" (15の夜; lit. "The Night of Fifteen") as a duo named Crouching Boys, with Tomi Yo. The song was included on a tribute album to Yutaka Ozaki, "Blue" A Tribute to Yutaka Ozaki, which reached number one in Japan.

Ozaki graduated from American School in Japan in June 2008 and attended Keio University Faculty of Environment and Information Studies in 2008. He worked as a radio DJ on InterFM, hosting the show Concerned Generation. In July 2012, Ozaki first played in public at Fuji Rock Festival 2012. His second show on InterFM, titled Between The Lines started in April 2013.

=== 2016–present: Let Freedom Ring and Seize the Day ===
After the graduation from graduate school, Ozaki launched his music career. In July 2016, he appeared on the television music show Ongaku no Hi, and played his father's song "I Love You" and his first original song, "Hajimari no Machi". In September 2016, Ozaki embarked his first live concert as a solo singer, entitled Billboard Classics Hiroya Ozaki Premium Concert: Hajimari no Machi, at Yomiuri Otemachi Hall.

Ozaki's debut single "Hajimari no Machi" was released in September 2016, through Toy's Factory. The song peaked at number fifty on the Billboard Japan Hot 100 chart. His first extended play Let Freedom Ring was released in March 2017 to a commercial success, reaching number twenty-one in Japan. Ozaki embarked on the tour entitled Let Freedom Ring Tour 2017 in support of the extended play.

In September 2017, "Glory Days" was released as the lead single from Ozaki's second extended play. The song served as the theme song to the Japanese animated movie Psalm of Planets Eureka Seven: Hi-Evolution. The song successfully reached number thirty-eight on the Billboard Japan Hot 100 chart and topped on the iTunes Japan. His second extended play Seize the Day was released in October 2017 and peaked number thirteen in Japan. To promote the extended play, Ozaki embarked his second tour, Seize the Day Tour 2017 from October 2017, at NHK Osaka Hall. His first unplugged concert tour, One Man Stand 2017 started in December 2017.

Ozaki released a single, "Hurry Up!", with Sky-Hi and Kerenmi, in April 2018. He embarked his fourth concert tour entitled Beyond All Borders 2018 in May 2018. In September 2018, Ozaki announced that he would release a new single, "Kono Sora wo Subete Kimi ni" (この空をすべて君に). The song serves as the theme song to the Japanese television anime series Sōten no Ken: Re:Genesis.

== Discography ==
=== Extended plays ===
List of EPs, with selected details and chart positions
| Title | Album details | Peak chart positions | |
| Title | Album details | JPN | JPN CD |
|---|---|---|---|
| Let Freedom Ring | Released: 22 March 2017; Label: Toy's Factory; Format: CD, digital download | 23 | 21 |
| Seize the Day | Released: 4 October 2017; Label: Toy's Factory; Format: CD, digital download | — | 13 |

=== Singles ===
==== As lead artist ====
List of singles, with selected chart positions
| Song | Year | Peak chart positions | Album |
| Song | Year | JPN | Album |
|---|---|---|---|
| "Hajimari no Machi" | 2016 | 50 | Let Freedom Ring |
| "Glory Days" | 2017 | 32 | Seize the Day |
| "Hurry Up!" (Smooth Drive Version) (featuring Sky-Hi and Kerenmi) | 2018 | — | Non-album singles |
| "Kono Sora wo Subete Kimi ni" | 2018 | — | Non-album singles |
"—" denotes releases that did not chart or were not released in that territory.

==== Promotional singles ====
List of singles, with selected chart positions
| Song | Year | Peak chart positions | Album |
| Song | Year | Billboard Japan Hot 100 | Album |
|---|---|---|---|
| "Someday Smile" | 2017 | 89 | Let Freedom Ring |

==== As a featured artist ====
| Song | Year | Album |
|---|---|---|
| "15 no Yoru" (15の夜) (As a member of Crouching Boys) | 2004 | "Blue" a Tribute to Yutaka Ozaki |
| "Haru" (Wakadanna feat. Hiroya Ozaki) | 2016 | Wakadanna 5: Foie Gras Nannte Iraneeyo |
| "Hurry Up!" (Sky-Hi feat. Hiroya Ozaki) | 2018 | Best Catalyst |
