= Satō Sankichi =

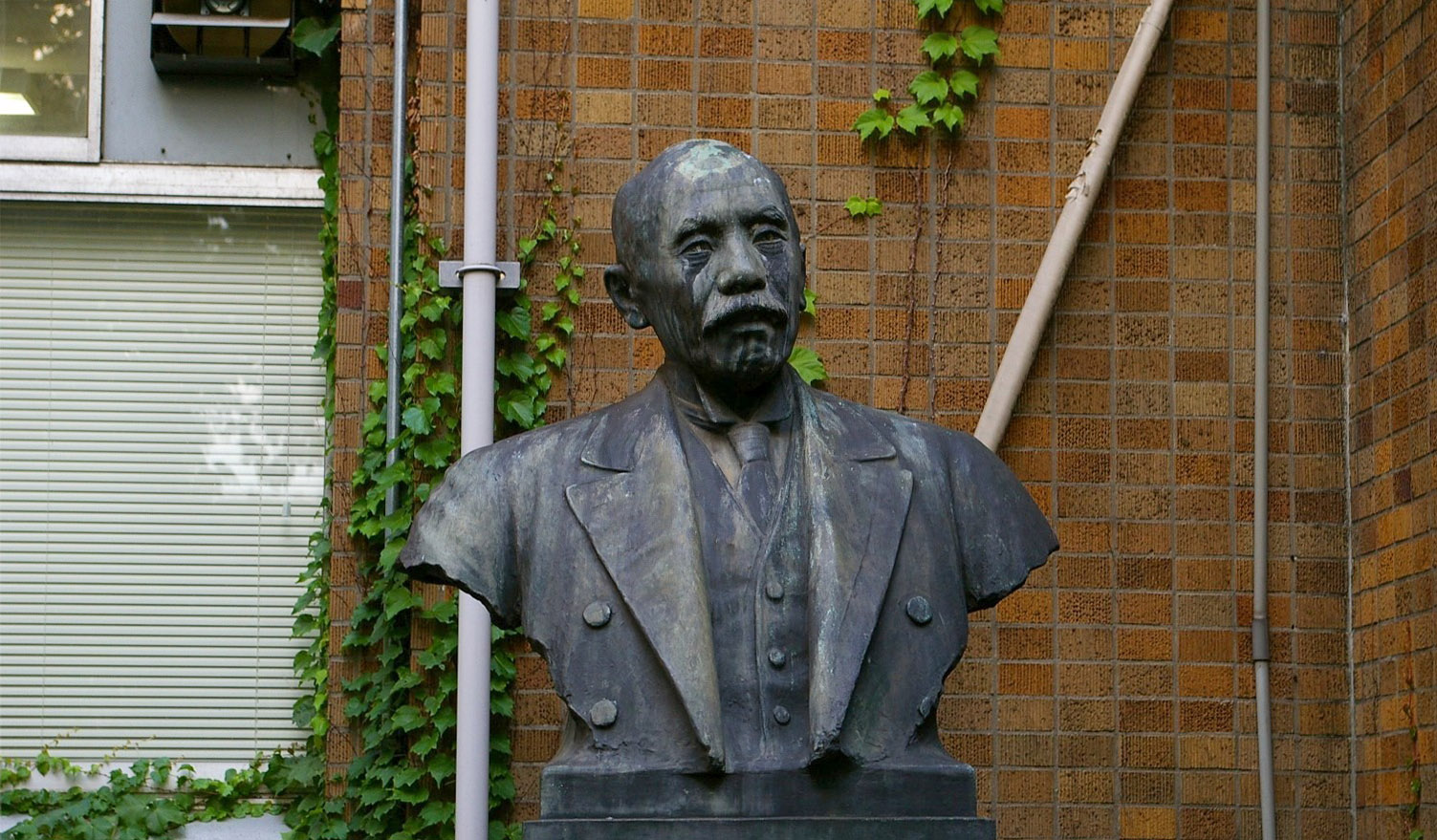
Statue of Satō Sankichi in University of Tokyo

Satō Sankichi (佐藤 三吉; December 30, 1857—June 17, 1943) was a Japanese surgeon and professor.

== Biography ==
Sato was born in 1857, the third son of Ōgaki Domain member Satō Tadasaburō. After his father died in 1871, he moved to Tokyo and entered a private school run by Shiba Ryōkai (司馬凌海).

Sato attended Tokyo University, learning surgery under the guidance of Julius Scriba before graduating in 1882. Sato then studied abroad with Aoyama Tanemichi in Germany. In 1887, he became professor of Imperial University, and medical center director of attached hospital. In 1898, he founded the Japan Surgical Society with Tsugishige Kondo. In 1918, he became president of Tokyo University Faculty of Medicine. He was one of the first Japanese surgeons to make use of antiseptics in surgical practice.

In 1921, he was named emeritus professor of Tokyo University, and became a member of the House of Peers.
