= Sankichi Ozaki =

Japanese photographer

Sankichi Ozaki (尾崎 三吉, Ozaki Sankichi; 1912–1994) was a renowned Japanese photographer.
