= Alex Millar (poker) =

British poker player (born 1985)

- Nicknames: Kanu7; IReadYrSoul
- Born: 29 July 1985 (age 41)

World Series of Poker
- Bracelet: None
- Money finishes: 6

World Poker Tour
- Title: None
- Final table: None

European Poker Tour
- Title: None
- Final table: None
- Money finish: 1

Alexander Millar (born 29 July 1985) is a British professional poker player who specializes in online high-stakes heads-up cash games, specifically No Limit Hold'em, playing under the alias Kanu7 on PokerStars and IReadYrSoul on Full Tilt Poker.

A mathematics graduate from the University of Warwick, he rose to prominence in the late 2000s as one of the most successful online heads-up specialists. Millar was signed to the PokerStars Team Online in 2013, a role he held until early 2015, and later joined partypoker Team Pro from 2017 to 2019. In addition to his playing career, he has been active as a coach and strategy content creator for aspiring poker professionals.

== Poker career ==
Millar specializes in online high-stakes No Limit Hold'em and rarely plays live tournaments. He has earned over $2,600,000 playing on PokerStars and over $1,800,000 playing on Full Tilt.

Millar had studied at Warwick University. He began playing freerolls and $5 tourneys for fun in his 3rd year. In the 4th year, he started to play low buy-in tourneys, SnGs and 50NL. During that year, Alex moved up from 50NL & 100NL to playing 2000NL & 5000NL. After that he decided to take poker as a career.

In 2013, Alex was signed as a part of PokerStars team pro. He resigned from his role as stars ambassador in 2015.

Millar considers Doug Polk, Ben Sulsky, and Isaac Haxton to be his toughest opponents.
