= Ox (Belfast restaurant) =

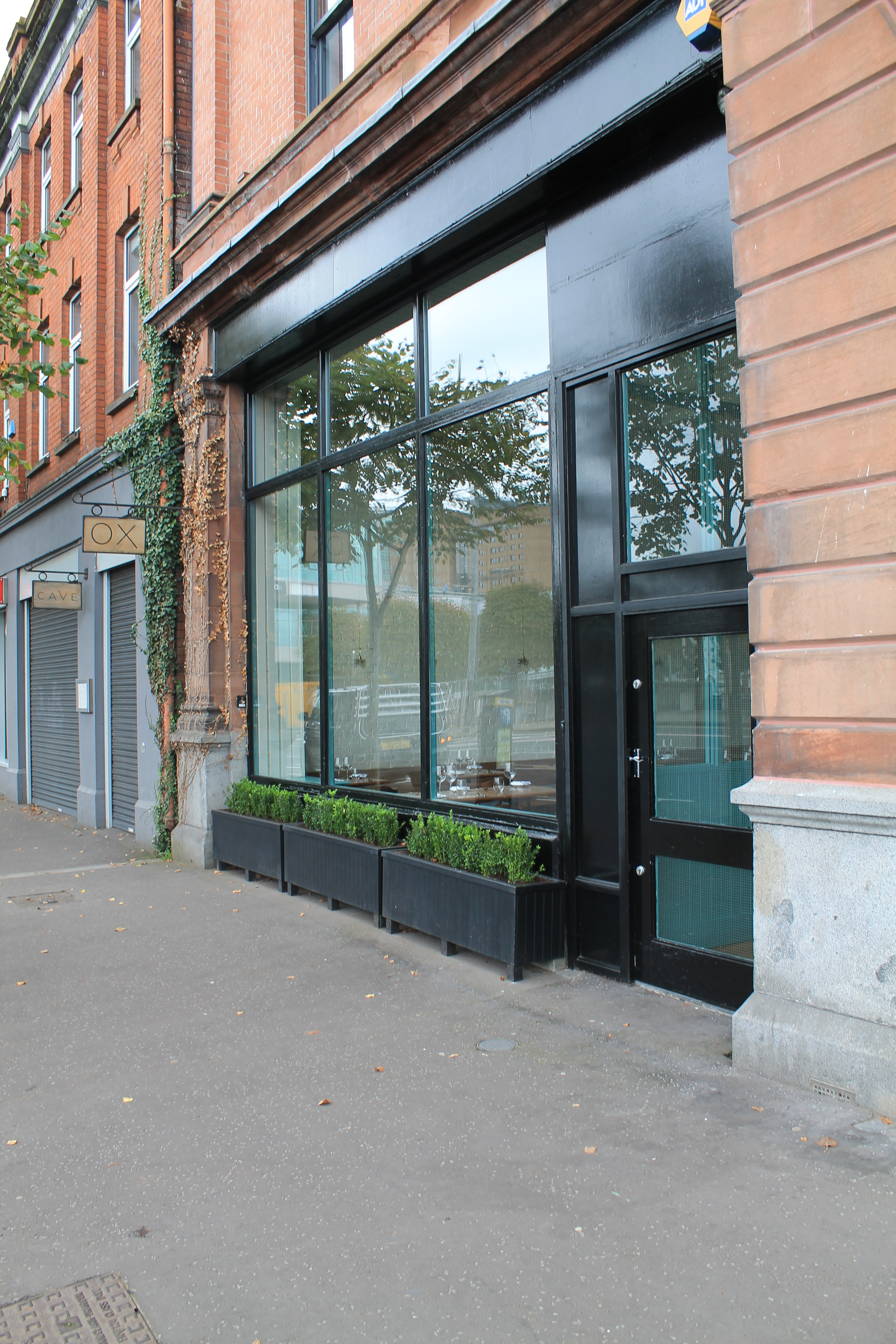

- Location within Greater Belfast

Restaurant information
- Owners: Stephen Toman and Alain Kerloc'h
- Head chef: Stephen Toman
- Food type: Irish cuisine
- Rating: Michelin Guide
- Location: 1 Oxford Street, Belfast, County Antrim, BT1 3LA, Northern Ireland
- Coordinates: 54.599287°N 5.921963°W
- Website: oxbelfast.com

Ox is a restaurant in Belfast, Northern Ireland. It has had a Michelin star since 2016.

Head chef of Ox is Stephen Toman.

== Awards ==
- Michelin star: since 2016

== See also ==
- List of Michelin starred restaurants in Ireland
