= Alexander Miller (composer) =

American musician

Alexander Lamont Miller in Grand Rapids, Michigan.

Alexander Lamont Miller (born September 24, 1968) is an American music composer and Assistant Principal Oboist with the Grand Rapids Symphony. Mr. Miller's 1998 composition "Let Freedom Ring", for large orchestra and narrator, is a symphonic setting of Martin Luther King Jr.'s 1963 "I Have a Dream" speech; narration has been performed by President Bill Clinton, James Earl Jones, William Warfield and Danny Glover. Mr. Miller's composition Fireworks was premiered at Carnegie Hall in 2005 as part of the Grand Rapids Symphony's 75th anniversary celebration. More recently, Mr. Miller's 2009 composition "Remix in D" was commissioned by the Modesto Symphony Orchestra and performed by the Grand Rapids Symphony.
