= Michael Deane (chef) =

British chef

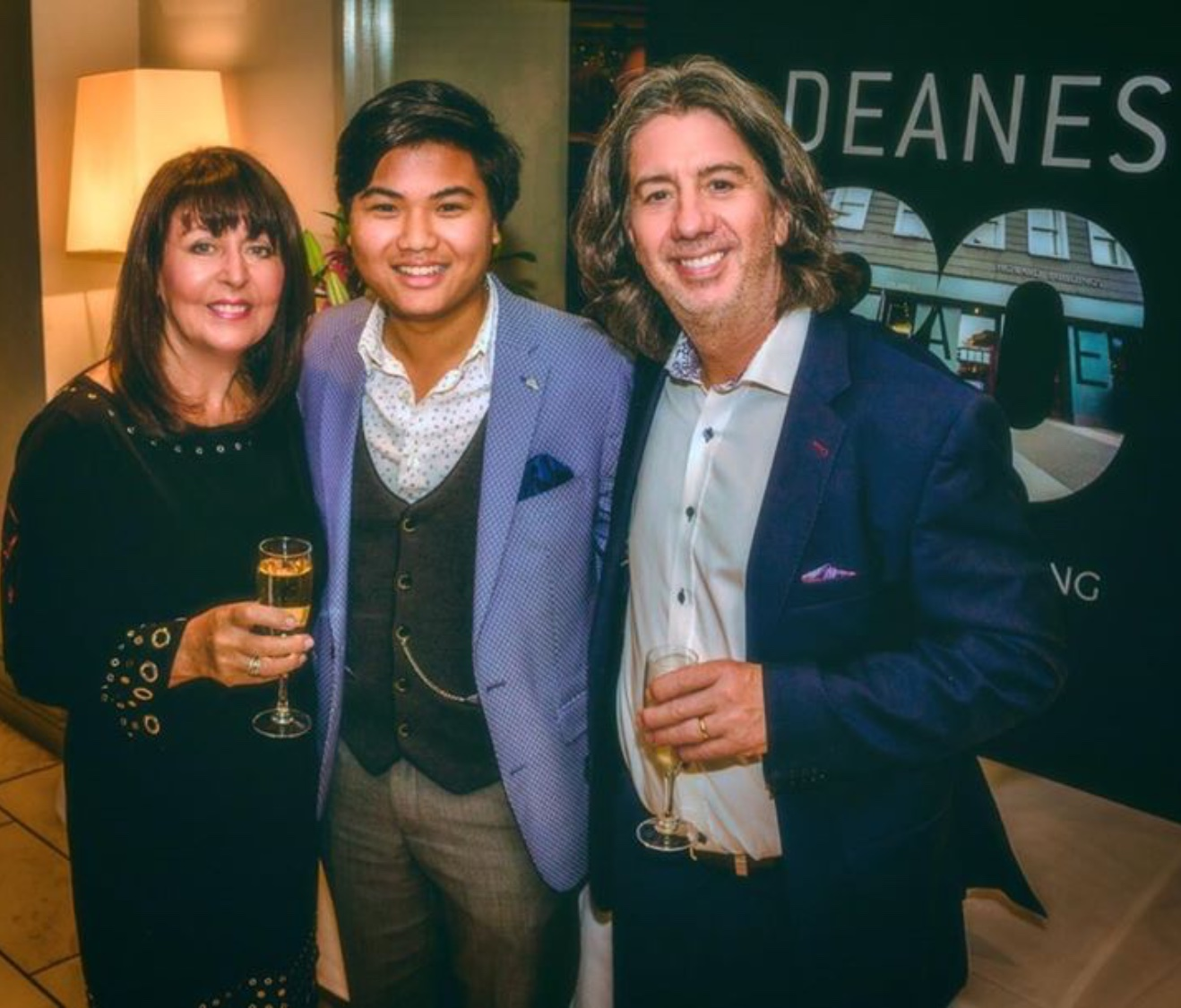
- Michael Deane and his family at 20 Years of Deanes celebratory dinner in Deanes at Queens
- Born: 19 March 1961 (age 65); Lisburn, Northern Ireland
- Culinary career
- Cooking style: European
- Rating: Michelin stars
- Current restaurant(s): Deanes Meatlocker, Deanes Love Fish, Deanes Eipic, Deanes Deli and Vin Café, Deanes at Queens, Deane and Decano

Michael Deane (born 19 March 1961) is a chef from Lisburn, Northern Ireland.

Deane started his career at Claridge's in London. In 1993 he moved back to Northern Ireland and opened Deane's on the Square with his cousin, Haydn Deane in Helen's Bay, County Down. It was there he won his first Michelin star.

In 1997 he opened a two-storey establishment in Belfast's city centre on Howard Street. It included Deane's Brasserie on the ground floor and Restaurant Michael Deane on the first floor. In the same year the restaurant was awarded a Michelin star. In 2007, the name of the restaurant was changed to the simpler Deanes. It held this for 13 years, making it the longest running and only Michelin star holder in Northern Ireland however lost this accolade in 2011, because of a 4-month closure due to frost damage and severe flooding. Deanes has also been awarded four Automobile Association Rosettes. The Brasserie held a Bib Gourmand from Michelin. Deane now owns Deanes Meatlocker, Deanes Love Fish and Deanes Eipic, all of which are located on the ground floor of the Howard Street building with a private function room on the first floor. He also owns Deanes Deli on Bedford Street, located close to the BBC NI headquarters, Deanes at Queens in the Queens University area and Deane and Decano on the Lisburn Road, both in the South of the city.

== Achievements ==
In 2010 Deane joined the University of Ulster as a visiting professor. At the 2017 Catey Awards in London's Grosvenor House Hotel, Deane was shortlisted for Restaurateur of the Year.

== Personal ==
In 1997 Deane married UTV Live presenter Kate Smith in a private ceremony in Scotland. They have one son, Marco.
