= Álvaro Díaz (motorcyclist) =

Spanish motorcycle road racer

- Nationality: Spanish
- Born: 7 August 2003 (age 23); Valencia, Spain
- Current team: Yamaha Thailand Racing Team
- Bike number: 80
Motorcycle racing career statistics
Supersport World Championship
Active years	2023-
Manufacturers	Yamaha
Championships	0
2024 championship position	33rd (6 pts)
Starts / Wins / Podiums / Poles / F. laps / Points; 21 / 0 / 0 / 0 / 0 / 12
Supersport 300 World Championship
Active years	2020-2022
Manufacturers	Yamaha
Championships	1
2022 championship position	1st (239 pts)
Starts / Wins / Podiums / Poles / F. laps / Points; 32 / 2 / 11 / 0 / 1 / 301

Álvaro Díaz Cebrián (born 7 August 2003) is a Spanish professional motorcycle racer. He is currently competes in the Supersport World Championship with Arco YART Yamaha WorldSSP. He won the Spanish Supersport 300 Championship in 2021 and the Supersport 300 World Championship in 2022.

== Career ==
=== Early career ===
Díaz began his career in the challenge80 class of the Spanish RFME 2015 championship, moving to PreMoto3 in 2016. In 2017, he participated in the Spanish Supersport 300 championship (consisting of three races) with a Kawasaki Ninja 300 of the ETG Racing team. He took part in only one race and finished fourth, finishing eighth in the championship. In 2018, he continued to compete in the SSP 300 (eight races passed), switching to the Yamaha YZF-R3 of the Arco Motor University Team, with which he finished in 13th final position, with a sixth place as his best result in the race. In 2019, still in Supersport 300 (SBK junior) with the same bike and team as last year, he obtained two third places and finished the season in sixth place in the standings.

=== Supersport 300 World Championship ===
In 2020, Díaz made his Supersport 300 World Championship debut with the Biblion MotoXRacing Yamaha team. In race 1 of the opening round, he finished eighth, achieving his best finish of the season. He finished the season in 21st position with 20 points. In the same year, he also participated in five races (out of the thirteen scheduled) of the Spanish SSP 300 championship, obtaining a second and a third place and finishing in eighth place overall.

In 2021, Díaz returned full-time to the Spanish SSP 300 championship, taking the national title with six victories and ten podiums overall from a total of fourteen races. In the same year he also took part in four races of the world championship as a wildcard. In the Catalunya round with the Yamaha MS Racing team, he finished in fifth place in race 1 and scored his first podium in race 2, a second place, as well as setting the fastest lap. In the subsequent Jerez round held with the Arco-Motor University Team, Díaz finished fifth in both races, however suffering a disqualification in race 2 for irresponsible driving. He finished the season in 19th position with 42 points.

In 2022, Díaz returned to the Supersport 300 World Championship as the only regular driver of the Arco Motor University Team. In the inaugural Aragon round, Díaz took second place in race 1 and scored his first victory in race 2, topping a world championship standings for the first time. He maintained the leadership of the championship for almost the entire season, sometimes alternating with his compatriot Marc García, and with eleven podium finishes including two victories, he won the sixth edition of the Supersport 300 World Championship.

== Career statistics ==
=== Career highlights ===
- 2021: 1st, Spanish Supersport 300 Championship

=== FIM Stock European Championship ===
==== Races by year ====
(key) (Races in bold indicate pole position; races in italics indicate fastest lap)

Year	Bike	1	2	3	4	5	6	7	Pos	Pts
2026	Yamaha	CAT; 13	EST; 12	JER; 4	MAG	VAL	ARA	MIS	11th*	20*

* Season still in progress.

=== Supersport 300 World Championship ===
==== Races by year ====
(key)

Year	Bike	1	2	3	4	5	6	7	8	9	10	11	12	13	14	15	16	Pos	Pts	Ref
2020	Yamaha	SPA; 8	SPA; 14	POR; 23	POR; 16	SPA; 21	SPA; 22	SPA; 13	SPA; 21	SPA; DNQ	SPA; DNQ	FRA; Ret	FRA; 9	POR; 18	POR; 18			21st	20	
2021	Yamaha	SPA	SPA	ITA	ITA	NED	NED	CZE	CZE	FRA	FRA	SPA; 5	SPA; 2	SPA; 5	SPA; DSQ	POR	POR	19th	42	
2022	Yamaha	ARA; 2	ARA; 1	NED; 11	NED; 2	EST; 6	EST; 26	ITA; 2	ITA; 1	CZE; 3	CZE; 2	FRA; 3	FRA; 2	CAT; 2	CAT; 4	POR; 7	POR; 18	1st	239	

=== Supersport World Championship ===
==== Races by year ====
(key) (Races in bold indicate pole position; races in italics indicate fastest lap)

Year	Bike	1		2		3		4		5		6		7		8		9		10		11		12		Pos	Pts
Year	Bike	R1	R2	R1	R2	R1	R2	R1	R2	R1	R2	R1	R2	R1	R2	R1	R2	R1	R2	R1	R2	R1	R2	R1	R2	Pos	Pts
2023	Yamaha	AUS	AUS	INA	INA	NED; DNQ	NED; DNQ	SPA; 26	SPA; 20	ITA; Ret	ITA; 21	GBR; Ret	GBR; 20	IMO; Ret	IMO; 13	CZE; Ret	CZE; DNS	FRA; 27	FRA; 21	SPA; 13	SPA; 16	POR; 23	POR; 16	SPA; 23	SPA; 21	34th	6
2024	Yamaha	AUS	AUS	SPA	SPA	NED	NED	ITA	ITA	GBR	GBR	CZE	CZE	POR	POR	FRA; 13	FRA; 22	ITA; 13	ITA; 17	SPA	SPA	POR	POR	SPA	SPA	33rd	6

* Season still in progress.
