= 2020 Supersport 300 World Championship =

4th season of the Supersport 300 World Championship

2020 Supersport 300 World Championship
Previous:	2019	Next:	2021
Support series: Superbike World Championship; Supersport World Championship

The 2020 Supersport 300 World Championship was the fourth season of the Supersport 300 World Championship of motorcycle racing.

== Race calendar and results ==
The 2020 season calendar was announced on 21 November 2019, with 10 races scheduled.

Due to the coronavirus pandemic, the Jerez, Assen, Aragon and Misano rounds were rescheduled to a later date, while the Imola and Oschersleben rounds were cancelled. As a result of updates made to the MotoGP calendar for the same reason, the French round date was also affected. Despite having already been rescheduled, the Assen round was later postponed to a to-be-determined date, along with the Donington round.

On 19 June, an updated calendar was published; for the restart, Jerez and Portimão were brought forward from their respective dates and a second round at Aragon was added to the schedule. Other four rounds—the first at Aragon, as well as Barcelona, Magny-Cours and Misano—either kept their original or revised dates, although the latter event was labelled as 'to be confirmed'. Two rounds—Donington and Assen—were included without a confirmed date and were subsequently cancelled on 24 July. The Misano round was cancelled and replaced by a round in Estoril on 18 August.

Along with the calendar, the event timetable was also revised, as an additional race to be held on Saturday was added to each weekend.

2020 calendar
Rnd.	Country	Circuit	Date	Superpole	Fastest lap	Winning rider	Winning team
1	Spain	Circuito de Jerez	1 August (Note: The Jerez round was originally due to take place on 27–29 March 2020. It was first postponed to 23–25 October and later moved to 31 July–2 August in response to the COVID-19 pandemic.)	(Brazil) Meikon Kawakami	(Spain) Ana Carrasco	(Spain) Unai Orradre	Yamaha MS Racing
1	Spain	Circuito de Jerez	2 August	(Brazil) Meikon Kawakami	(Spain) Ana Carrasco	(Turkey) Bahattin Sofuoğlu	Biblion Motoxracing Yamaha WorldSSP300
2	Portugal	Algarve International Circuit	8 August (Note: The Portimão round was originally due to take place on 4–6 September 2020. It was moved to 7–9 August in response to the COVID-19 pandemic.)	(Japan) Yuta Okaya	(France) Samuel Di Sora	(Spain) Ana Carrasco	Kawasaki Provec WorldSSP300
2	Portugal	Algarve International Circuit	9 August	(Japan) Yuta Okaya	(Spain) Unai Orradre	(Netherlands) Scott Deroue	MTM Kawasaki Motoport
3	Spain	MotorLand Aragón	29 August (Note: The Aragon round was originally due to take place on 22–24 May 2020. It was postponed to 28–30 August in response to the COVID-19 pandemic.)	(Netherlands) Jeffrey Buis	(Turkey) Bahattin Sofuoğlu	(Netherlands) Jeffrey Buis	MTM Kawasaki Motoport
3	Spain	MotorLand Aragón	30 August	(Netherlands) Jeffrey Buis	(Spain) Ana Carrasco	(Netherlands) Jeffrey Buis	MTM Kawasaki Motoport
4	Spain	MotorLand Aragón	5 September	(Turkey) Bahattin Sofuoğlu	(Spain) Ana Carrasco	(Turkey) Bahattin Sofuoğlu	Biblion Motoxracing Yamaha WorldSSP300
4	Spain	MotorLand Aragón	6 September	(Turkey) Bahattin Sofuoğlu	(Netherlands) Glenn van Straalen	(Netherlands) Jeffrey Buis	MTM Kawasaki Motoport
5	Spain	Circuit de Barcelona-Catalunya	19 September	(United Kingdom) Tom Booth-Amos	(Netherlands) Jeffrey Buis	(United Kingdom) Tom Booth-Amos	RT Motorsports by SKM – Kawasaki
5	Spain	Circuit de Barcelona-Catalunya	20 September	(United Kingdom) Tom Booth-Amos	(Netherlands) Jeffrey Buis	(Japan) Yuta Okaya	MTM Kawasaki Motoport
6	France	Circuit de Nevers Magny-Cours	3 October (Note: The Magny-Cours round was originally due to take place on 25–27 September 2020. It was postponed to 2–4 October in response to the COVID-19 pandemic.)	(United Kingdom) Tom Booth-Amos	(Netherlands) Scott Deroue	(Netherlands) Jeffrey Buis	MTM Kawasaki Motoport
6	France	Circuit de Nevers Magny-Cours	4 October	(United Kingdom) Tom Booth-Amos	(France) Samuel Di Sora	(Spain) Marc García	2R Racing
7	Portugal	Circuito do Estoril	17 October (Note: The Estoril round was added to the calendar on 18 August 2020. It replaced the Misano round which was cancelled in response to the COVID-19 pandemic.)	(Ukraine) Nick Kalinin	(Netherlands) Koen Meuffels	(Spain) Mika Pérez	Prodina Ircos Team WorldSSP300
7	Portugal	Circuito do Estoril	18 October	(Ukraine) Nick Kalinin	(Ukraine) Nick Kalinin	(Netherlands) Koen Meuffels	MTM Kawasaki Motoport
Races under contract to run in 2020, but cancelled:
—	Netherlands	TT Circuit Assen	N/A (Note: The Assen round was originally due to take place on 17–19 April 2020. It was postponed first to 21–23 August, later to an unannounced date and subsequently cancelled in response to the COVID-19 pandemic.)	—N/a			
—	Italy	Autodromo Enzo e Dino Ferrari	N/A (Note: The Imola round was originally due to take place on 8–10 May 2020. It was cancelled in response to the COVID-19 pandemic.)	—N/a			
—	United Kingdom	Donington Park	N/A (Note: The Donington round was originally due to take place on 3–5 July 2020. It was postponed to an unannounced date and subsequently cancelled in response to the COVID-19 pandemic.)	—N/a			
—	Germany	Motorsport Arena Oschersleben	N/A (Note: The Oschersleben round was originally due to take place on 31 July–2 August 2020. It was cancelled in response to the COVID-19 pandemic.)	—N/a			
—	Italy	Misano World Circuit Marco Simoncelli	N/A (Note: The Misano round was originally due to take place on 12–14 June 2020. It was initially postponed to 6–8 November, but was later cancelled on 18 August 2020 in response to the COVID-19 pandemic.)	—N/a			

== Entry list ==
2020 entry list
Team	Constructor	Motorcycle	No.	Rider	Rounds
Smrž Racing – Willi Race; Smrž Racing by Blue Garage; ACCR Smrž Racing by Blue Garage	Kawasaki	Ninja 400	2	(Spain) Alejandro Carrión	1–5, 7
Smrž Racing – Willi Race; Smrž Racing by Blue Garage; ACCR Smrž Racing by Blue Garage	Kawasaki	Ninja 400	47	(Czech Republic) Matyáš Červenka	1–5
Smrž Racing – Willi Race; Smrž Racing by Blue Garage; ACCR Smrž Racing by Blue Garage	Kawasaki	Ninja 400	65	(Australia) Sharni Pinfold	6
Smrž Racing – Willi Race; Smrž Racing by Blue Garage; ACCR Smrž Racing by Blue Garage	Kawasaki	Ninja 400	76	(Czech Republic) Štěpán Zuda	7
Machado Came SBK	Yamaha	YZF-R3	3	(Italy) Marco Gaggi	All
Machado Came SBK	Yamaha	YZF-R3	14	(France) Enzo de la Vega	All
Machado Came SBK	Yamaha	YZF-R3	20	(France) Gaëtan Matern	1–3
Machado Came SBK	Yamaha	YZF-R3	37	(Portugal) Pedro Fragoso	5–7
Machado Came SBK	Yamaha	YZF-R3	40	(Spain) Marcos Lahoz	4
Machado Came SBK	Yamaha	YZF-R3	73	(Spain) José Luis Pérez González	All
Freudenberg KTM WorldSSP Team	KTM	RC 390 R	4	(Germany) Christian Stange	1–2
Freudenberg KTM WorldSSP Team	KTM	RC 390 R	97	(Germany) Maximilian Kappler	1–2
I+Dent Racing Team	Yamaha	YZF-R3	5	(Spain) Javier Corral	5
MTM Kawasaki Motoport	Kawasaki	Ninja 400	6	(Netherlands) Jeffrey Buis	All
MTM Kawasaki Motoport	Kawasaki	Ninja 400	17	(Netherlands) Koen Meuffels	All
MTM Kawasaki Motoport	Kawasaki	Ninja 400	61	(Japan) Yuta Okaya	All
MTM Kawasaki Motoport	Kawasaki	Ninja 400	95	(Netherlands) Scott Deroue	All
GP Project	Kawasaki	Ninja 400	7	(France) Johan Gimbert	All
GP Project	Kawasaki	Ninja 400	32	(Spain) Álex Millán	6
GP Project	Kawasaki	Ninja 400	59	(Italy) Alessandro Zanca	7
GP Project	Kawasaki	Ninja 400	80	(Italy) Gabriele Mastroluca	1–5
Prodina Ircos Team WorldSSP300	Kawasaki	Ninja 400	8	(Spain) Mika Pérez	All
Prodina Ircos Team WorldSSP300	Kawasaki	Ninja 400	48	(Italy) Thomas Brianti	All
Team Chiodo Moto Racing	Yamaha	YZF-R3	9	(Italy) Paolo Grassia	1–3
Team Chiodo Moto Racing	Kawasaki	Ninja 400	9	(Italy) Paolo Grassia	4–6
Yamaha MS Racing	Yamaha	YZF-R3	10	(Spain) Unai Orradre	All
Yamaha MS Racing	Yamaha	YZF-R3	23	(France) Sylvain Markarian	All
Yamaha MS Racing	Yamaha	YZF-R3	25	(Germany) Alan Kroh	All
Yamaha MS Racing	Yamaha	YZF-R3	70	(Portugal) Miguel Duarte	7
Yamaha MS Racing	Yamaha	YZF-R3	87	(Brazil) Ton Kawakami	All
Kawasaki Provec WorldSSP300	Kawasaki	Ninja 400	11	(Spain) Ana Carrasco	1–4
Doré Racing Team	Yamaha	YZF-R3	12	(France) Romain Doré	1–4, 6
Kawasaki GP Project	Kawasaki	Ninja 400	15	(Italy) Alfonso Coppola	All
Kawasaki GP Project	Kawasaki	Ninja 400	85	(Italy) Kevin Sabatucci	All
Kawasaki GP Project	Kawasaki	Ninja 400	88	(Italy) Bruno Ieraci	All
Gradaracorse	Kawasaki	Ninja 400	16	(Italy) Emanuele Vocino	1–2
Scuderia Maranga Racing	Kawasaki	Ninja 400	18	(United Kingdom) Indy Offer	1, 3–7
Scuderia Maranga Racing	Kawasaki	Ninja 400	21	(Brazil) Enzo Valentim Garcia	2
Scuderia Maranga Racing	Kawasaki	Ninja 400	33	(Spain) Óscar Núñez	3
Scuderia Maranga Racing	Kawasaki	Ninja 400	33	(Spain) Óscar Núñez	7
Scuderia Maranga Racing	Kawasaki	Ninja 400	51	(Spain) Héctor Yebra	7
Scuderia Maranga Racing	Kawasaki	Ninja 400	58	(Spain) Iñigo Iglesias Bravo	1–6
Scuderia Maranga Racing	Kawasaki	Ninja 400	68	(Italy) Jarno Ioverno	1–6
2R Racing	Kawasaki	Ninja 400	19	(Spain) Víctor Rodríguez Nuñez	3–4
2R Racing	Kawasaki	Ninja 400	43	(Spain) Marc García	5–7
2R Racing	Kawasaki	Ninja 400	59	(Italy) Alessandro Zanca	3–6
2R Racing	Kawasaki	Ninja 400	94	(Spain) Sara Sánchez	7
EAB Ten Kate Racing	Yamaha	YZF-R3	19	(Spain) Víctor Rodríguez Nuñez	5–7
EAB Ten Kate Racing	Yamaha	YZF-R3	30	(Netherlands) Glenn van Straalen	1–4
Battley–RT Motorsports by SKM–Kawasaki; Carl Cox–RT Motorsports by SKM–Kawasaki; RT Motorsports by SKM – Kawasaki	Kawasaki	Ninja 400	22	(Ukraine) Nick Kalinin	All
Battley–RT Motorsports by SKM–Kawasaki; Carl Cox–RT Motorsports by SKM–Kawasaki; RT Motorsports by SKM – Kawasaki	Kawasaki	Ninja 400	44	(Australia) Tom Bramich	All
Battley–RT Motorsports by SKM–Kawasaki; Carl Cox–RT Motorsports by SKM–Kawasaki; RT Motorsports by SKM – Kawasaki	Kawasaki	Ninja 400	49	(Belgium) Luca De Vleeschauwer	7
Battley–RT Motorsports by SKM–Kawasaki; Carl Cox–RT Motorsports by SKM–Kawasaki; RT Motorsports by SKM – Kawasaki	Kawasaki	Ninja 400	69	(United Kingdom) Tom Booth-Amos	All
Biblion Motoxracing Yamaha WSSP300	Yamaha	YZF-R3	24	(Poland) Daniel Blin	All
Biblion Motoxracing Yamaha WSSP300	Yamaha	YZF-R3	54	(Turkey) Bahattin Sofuoğlu	All
Biblion Motoxracing Yamaha WSSP300	Yamaha	YZF-R3	72	(Spain) Álvaro Díaz	All
Team BrCorse	Yamaha	YZF-R3	26	(Italy) Mirko Gennai	All
Kawasaki ParkinGO Team	Kawasaki	Ninja 400	27	(Italy) Filippo Rovelli	All
Kawasaki ParkinGO Team	Kawasaki	Ninja 400	71	(Australia) Tom Edwards	All
OUTDO Kawasaki TPR	Kawasaki	Ninja 400	28	(Italy) Nicola Bernabè	5
OUTDO Kawasaki TPR	Kawasaki	Ninja 400	78	(Spain) Daniel Mogeda	5
Team Trasimeno	Yamaha	YZF-R3	34	(Spain) Beatriz Neila	5
Team Trasimeno	Yamaha	YZF-R3	64	(France) Hugo De Cancellis	All
ACCR Czech Talent Team – Willi Race	Kawasaki	Ninja 400	35	(Czech Republic) Lukáš Simon	6–7
ACCR Czech Talent Team – Willi Race	Kawasaki	Ninja 400	62	(Czech Republic) David Kubáň	5
ACCR Czech Talent Team – Willi Race	Kawasaki	Ninja 400	63	(Czech Republic) Miloslav Hřava	1–3
ACCR Czech Talent Team – Willi Race	Kawasaki	Ninja 400	96	(Czech Republic) Filip Salač	4
Stand Os Putos Racing Team	Yamaha	YZF-R3	37	(Portugal) Pedro Fragoso	2
Team Eleven	Kawasaki	Ninja 400	39	(Italy) Stefano Raineri	6
Freudenberg KTM Junior Team	KTM	RC 390 R	41	(Germany) Jan-Ole Jähnig	1–2
Freudenberg KTM Junior Team	KTM	RC 390 R	52	(Czech Republic) Oliver König	1–2
Alarxa Team Pons	Kawasaki	Ninja 400	42	(Spain) Iker García Abella	5
Team Brasil AD 78	Yamaha	YZF-R3	45	(Brazil) Felipe Macan	All
Team Brasil AD 78	Yamaha	YZF-R3	83	(Brazil) Meikon Kawakami	All
Leader Team Flembbo	Kawasaki	Ninja 400	46	(France) Samuel Di Sora	All
Movisio by Freudenberg Jr Team	Kawasaki	Ninja 400	52	(Czech Republic) Oliver König	3–5
WRP Wepol Racing	Yamaha	YZF-R3	53	(Czech Republic) Petr Svoboda	6–7
Team#109 Kawasaki	Kawasaki	Ninja 400	66	(United Kingdom) Eunan McGlinchey	1–6
Team#109 Kawasaki	Kawasaki	Ninja 400	86	(Republic of Ireland) James McManus	7
ETG Racing	Yamaha	YZF-R3	75	(Spain) Francesc Pérez	5
TGP Racing	Kawasaki	Ninja 400	77	(France) Loris Gruau	All
TGP Racing	Kawasaki	Ninja 400	93	(France) Adrien Quinet	All
Team Tomás Alonso	Kawasaki	Ninja 400	79	(Portugal) Tomás Alonso	2
Kawasaki Rame Moto Racing Team	Kawasaki	Ninja 400	79	(Portugal) Tomás Alonso	7
DEZA–ISMABON Racing Team	Kawasaki	Ninja 400	81	(Spain) Ángel Heredia	5
ProGP Racing	Yamaha	YZF-R3	84	(Italy) Kim Aloisi	All
ProGP Racing	Yamaha	YZF-R3	94	(Spain) Sara Sánchez	1–2
ProGP Racing	Yamaha	YZF-R3	98	(France) Tom Berçot	All
ProGP Racing	Yamaha	YZF-R3	99	(Spain) Adrián Huertas	3–7

Key
Regular rider
Wildcard rider
Replacement rider

- All entries used Pirelli tyres.

== Championship standings ==
Points system

Position	1st	2nd	3rd	4th	5th	6th	7th	8th	9th	10th	11th	12th	13th	14th	15th
Points	25	20	16	13	11	10	9	8	7	6	5	4	3	2	1

=== Riders' championship ===
Pos.	Rider	Bike	JER (Spain)		POR (Portugal)		ARA (Spain)		ARA (Spain)		CAT (Spain)		MAG (France)		EST (Portugal)		Pts
1	(Netherlands) Jeffrey Buis	Kawasaki	29	12	2	4	**1**	**1**	2	1	5	3	1	2	6	9	221
2	(Netherlands) Scott Deroue	Kawasaki	3	4	4	1	Ret	2	3	2	13	2	2	4	8	16	187
3	(Turkey) Bahattin Sofuoğlu	Yamaha	5	1	5	5	Ret	Ret	**1**	**3**	9	10	3	Ret	14	4	143
4	(Netherlands) Koen Meuffels	Kawasaki	14	15	9	8	EX	8	Ret	4	8	4	8	7	2	1	122
5	(Spain) Mika Pérez	Kawasaki	Ret	Ret	7	6	3	24	6	5	4	13	Ret	Ret	1	3	113
6	(United Kingdom) Tom Booth-Amos	Kawasaki	2	3	3	Ret	5	Ret	Ret	9	**1**	**Ret**	**Ret**	**26**	3	Ret	111
7	(Spain) Unai Orradre	Yamaha	1	6	Ret	2	6	3	5	6	20	25	20	16	Ret	13	105
8	(Spain) Ana Carrasco	Kawasaki	6	2	1	Ret	2	5	4	20							99
9	(France) Samuel Di Sora	Kawasaki	11	18	6	9	DNQ	DNQ	22	10	2	11	7	24	7	2	91
10	(Japan) Yuta Okaya	Kawasaki	4	Ret	**27**	**3**	Ret	Ret	Ret	Ret	27	1	6	5	12	6	89
11	(Brazil) Meikon Kawakami	Yamaha	**30**	**5**	8	Ret	8	4	10	12	15	5	Ret	DNS	9	5	80
12	(France) Hugo De Cancellis	Yamaha	Ret	9	Ret	Ret	4	9	Ret	13	14	7	5	3	Ret	DNS	68
13	(Italy) Bruno Ieraci	Kawasaki	21	7	Ret	Ret	7	6	7	7	Ret	Ret	11	12	4	Ret	68
14	(Italy) Kevin Sabatucci	Kawasaki	7	10	19	15	Ret	11	26	8	18	Ret	4	Ret	11	8	55
15	(Brazil) Ton Kawakami	Yamaha	10	11	10	Ret	Ret	7	12	14	11	27	10	14	10	14	53
16	(Spain) Marc García	Kawasaki									3	20	24	1	13	12	48
17	(Spain) Adrián Huertas	Yamaha					11	Ret	8	11	28	9	13	6	16	10	44
18	(Ukraine) Nick Kalinin	Kawasaki	9	8	11	Ret	14	13	Ret	18	Ret	8	Ret	Ret	**Ret**	**7**	42
19	(Italy) Filippo Rovelli	Kawasaki	27	13	DNQ	DNQ	17	12	DNQ	DNQ	6	Ret	Ret	11	Ret	Ret	22
20	(Spain) Víctor Rodríguez Nuñez	Kawasaki					DSQ	DSQ	DSQ	DSQ							20
20	(Spain) Víctor Rodríguez Nuñez	Yamaha									7	18	Ret	DNS	5	Ret	20
21	(Spain) Álvaro Díaz	Yamaha	8	14	23	16	21	22	13	21	DNQ	DNQ	Ret	9	18	18	20
22	(Spain) Iñigo Iglesias Bravo	Kawasaki	23	17	17	Ret	10	25	15	15	Ret	6	22	18			18
23	(Germany) Alan Kroh	Yamaha	15	16	DNQ	DNQ	9	14	9	16	25	16	DNQ	DNQ	19	15	18
24	(Australia) Tom Edwards	Kawasaki	Ret	24	Ret	7	Ret	Ret	16	23	DNQ	DNQ	Ret	8	Ret	22	17
25	(Netherlands) Glenn van Straalen	Yamaha	19	19	12	10	19	10	Ret	17							16
26	(France) Enzo de la Vega	Yamaha	20	22	15	11	18	17	20	19	DNQ	DNQ	9	15	DNQ	DNQ	14
27	(Italy) Alfonso Coppola	Kawasaki	22	20	16	13	12	19	18	26	12	17	Ret	13	Ret	Ret	14
28	(Brazil) Felipe Macan	Yamaha	25	25	Ret	24	Ret	DNS	DNQ	DNQ	16	24	12	10	DNQ	DNQ	10
29	(France) Johan Gimbert	Kawasaki	DSQ	DSQ	DNQ	DNQ	DSQ	DSQ	14	22	10	Ret	19	23	17	20	8
30	(Italy) Mirko Gennai	Yamaha	DNQ	DNQ	14	22	16	21	17	30	21	19	16	28	25	11	7
31	(Czech Republic) Oliver König	KTM	17	Ret	Ret	12											7
31	(Czech Republic) Oliver König	Kawasaki					13	16	Ret	25	DNS	DNS					7
32	(Spain) Alejandro Carrión	Kawasaki	13	Ret	13	19	15	18	24	29	23	Ret			Ret	26	7
33	(Czech Republic) Filip Salač	Kawasaki							11	NC							5
34	(Italy) Kim Aloisi	Yamaha	12	28	25	17	Ret	15	Ret	Ret	Ret	Ret	25	20	DNQ	DNQ	5
35	(Spain) Daniel Mogeda	Kawasaki									24	12					4
36	(Australia) Tom Bramich	Kawasaki	DNQ	DNQ	DNQ	DNQ	DNQ	DNQ	21	Ret	DNQ	DNQ	14	Ret	Ret	19	2
37	(Spain) Ángel Heredia	Kawasaki									29	14					2
38	(France) Tom Berçot	Yamaha	Ret	27	Ret	14	Ret	20	DNQ	DNQ	DNQ	DNQ	18	21	20	Ret	2
39	(Spain) José Luis Pérez González	Yamaha	DNQ	DNQ	DNQ	DNQ	DNQ	DNQ	DNQ	DNQ	22	23	DNQ	DNQ	15	Ret	1
40	(Poland) Daniel Blin	Yamaha	DNQ	DNQ	DNQ	DNQ	DNQ	DNQ	25	28	DNQ	DNQ	15	17	22	27	1
41	(Italy) Paolo Grassia	Yamaha	24	26	DNQ	DNQ	DNQ	DNQ									1
41	(Italy) Paolo Grassia	Kawasaki							19	24	Ret	15	DNQ	DNQ			1
	(Germany) Jan-Ole Jähnig	KTM	16	21	18	Ret											0
	(Spain) Iker García Abella	Kawasaki									17	22					0
	(Czech Republic) Lukáš Simon	Kawasaki											17	22	DNQ	DNQ	0
	(Czech Republic) Petr Svoboda	Yamaha											Ret	27	Ret	17	0
	(France) Sylvain Markarian	Yamaha	18	Ret	24	Ret	Ret	Ret	DNQ	DNQ	DNQ	DNQ	21	25	24	24	0
	(Italy) Gabriele Mastroluca	Kawasaki	28	23	21	18	Ret	23	23	27	26	26					0
	(Spain) Francesc Pérez	Yamaha									19	21					0
	(Italy) Jarno Ioverno	Kawasaki	DNQ	DNQ	DNQ	DNQ	DNQ	DNQ	DNQ	DNQ	DNQ	DNQ	23	19			0
	(Germany) Maximilian Kappler	KTM	DNQ	DNQ	20	Ret											0
	(Spain) Sara Sánchez	Yamaha	DNQ	DNQ	26	20											0
	(Spain) Sara Sánchez	Kawasaki													DNQ	DNQ	0
	(Spain) Óscar Núñez	Kawasaki					20	Ret							23	21	0
	(Italy) Marco Gaggi	Yamaha	DNQ	DNQ	DNQ	DNQ	DNQ	DNQ	DNQ	DNQ	DNQ	DNQ	DNQ	DNQ	21	23	0
	(Italy) Emanuele Vocino	Kawasaki	DNQ	DNQ	22	23											0
	(United Kingdom) Eunan McGlinchey	Kawasaki	DNQ	DNQ	DNQ	DNQ	DNQ	DNQ	DNQ	DNQ	DNQ	DNQ	26	DNS			0
	(Italy) Alessandro Zanca	Kawasaki					DNQ	DNQ	DNQ	DNQ	DNQ	DNQ	DNQ	DNQ	26	26	0
	(Germany) Christian Stange	KTM	26	29	DNQ	DNQ											0
	(Portugal) Tomás Alonso	Kawasaki			DNS	Ret									DNQ	DNQ	0
	(Italy) Thomas Brianti	Kawasaki	DSQ	DSQ	DSQ	DSQ	DSQ	DSQ	DSQ	DSQ	DSQ	DSQ	DSQ	DSQ	DSQ	DSQ	0
	(France) Adrien Quinet	Kawasaki	DNQ	DNQ	DNQ	DNQ	DNQ	DNQ	DNQ	DNQ	DNQ	DNQ	DNQ	DNQ	DNQ	DNQ	
	(France) Loris Gruau	Kawasaki	DNQ	DNQ	DNQ	DNQ	DNQ	DNQ	DNQ	DNQ	DNQ	DNQ	DNQ	DNQ	DNQ	DNQ	
	(United Kingdom) Indy Offer	Kawasaki	DNQ	DNQ			DNQ	DNQ	DNQ	DNQ	DNQ	DNQ	DNQ	DNQ	DNQ	DNQ	
	(France) Romain Doré	Yamaha	DNQ	DNQ	DNQ	DNQ	DNQ	DNQ	DNQ	DNQ			DNQ	DNQ			
	(Czech Republic) Matyáš Červenka	Kawasaki	DNQ	DNQ	DNQ	DNQ	DNQ	DNQ	DNQ	DNQ	DNQ	DNQ					
	(France) Gaëtan Matern	Yamaha	DNQ	DNQ	DNQ	DNQ	DNQ	DNQ									
	(Czech Republic) Miloslav Hřava	Kawasaki	DNQ	DNQ	DNQ	DNQ	DNQ	DNQ									
	(Portugal) Pedro Fragoso	Yamaha			DNQ	DNQ					DNQ	DNQ	DNQ	DNQ	DNQ	DNQ	
	(Brazil) Enzo Valentim Garcia	Kawasaki			DNQ	DNQ											
	(Spain) Marcos Lahoz	Yamaha							DNQ	DNQ							
	(Spain) Beatriz Neila	Yamaha									DNQ	DNQ					
	(Czech Republic) David Kubáň	Kawasaki									DNQ	DNQ					
	(Spain) Javier Corral	Yamaha									DNQ	DNQ					
	(Italy) Nicola Bernabè	Kawasaki									DNQ	DNQ					
	(Spain) Álex Millán	Kawasaki											DNQ	DNQ			
	(Australia) Sharni Pinfold	Kawasaki											DNQ	DNQ			
	(Italy) Stefano Raineri	Kawasaki											DNQ	DNQ			
	(Spain) Héctor Yebra	Kawasaki													DNQ	DNQ	
	(Republic of Ireland) James McManus	Kawasaki													DNQ	DNQ	
	(Belgium) Luca De Vleeschauwer	Kawasaki													DNQ	DNQ	
	(Portugal) Miguel Duarte	Yamaha													DNQ	DNQ	
	(Czech Republic) Štěpán Zuda	Kawasaki													DNQ	DNQ	
Pos.	Rider	Bike	JER (Spain)		POR (Portugal)		ARA (Spain)		ARA (Spain)		CAT (Spain)		MAG (France)		EST (Portugal)		Pts

Colour	Result
Gold	Winner
Silver	Second place
Bronze	Third place
Green	Points classification
Blue	Non-points classification
Blue	Non-classified finish (NC)
Purple	Retired, not classified (Ret)
Red	Did not qualify (DNQ)
Red	Did not pre-qualify (DNPQ)
Black	Disqualified (DSQ)
White	Did not start (DNS)
White	Withdrew (WD)
White	Race cancelled (C)
Blank	Did not practice (DNP)
Blank	Did not arrive (DNA)
Blank	Excluded (EX)

**Bold** – Pole position
Italics – Fastest lap

=== Teams' championship ===
Pos.	Team	Bike No.	JER (Spain)		POR (Portugal)		ARA (Spain)		ARA (Spain)		CAT (Spain)		MAG (France)		EST (Portugal)		Pts.
Pos.	Team	Bike No.	R1	R2	R1	R2	R1	R2	R1	R2	R1	R2	R1	R2	R1	R2	Pts.
1	(Belgium) MTM Kawasaki Motoport	6	29	12	2	4	**1**	**1**	2	1	5	3	1	2	6	9	478
1	(Belgium) MTM Kawasaki Motoport	95	3	4	4	1	Ret	2	3	2	13	2	2	4	8	16	478
1	(Belgium) MTM Kawasaki Motoport	61	4	Ret	**27**	**3**	Ret	Ret	Ret	Ret	27	1	6	5	12	6	478
1	(Belgium) MTM Kawasaki Motoport	17	14	15	9	8	EX	8	Ret	4	8	4	8	7	2	1	478
2	(Spain) Yamaha MS Racing	10	1	6	Ret	2	6	3	5	6	20	25	20	16	Ret	13	168
2	(Spain) Yamaha MS Racing	87	10	11	10	Ret	Ret	7	12	14	11	27	10	14	10	14	168
2	(Spain) Yamaha MS Racing	25	15	16	DNQ	DNQ	9	14	9	16	25	16	DNQ	DNQ	19	15	168
2	(Spain) Yamaha MS Racing	23	18	Ret	24	Ret	Ret	Ret	DNQ	DNQ	DNQ	DNQ	21	25	24	24	168
2	(Spain) Yamaha MS Racing	70													DNQ	DNQ	168
3	(Italy) Biblion Motoxracing Yamaha WorldSSP300	54	5	1	5	5	Ret	Ret	**1**	**3**	9	10	3	Ret	14	4	164
3	(Italy) Biblion Motoxracing Yamaha WorldSSP300	72	8	14	23	16	21	22	13	21	DNQ	DNQ	Ret	9	18	18	164
3	(Italy) Biblion Motoxracing Yamaha WorldSSP300	24	DNQ	DNQ	DNQ	DNQ	DNQ	DNQ	25	28	DNQ	DNQ	15	17	22	27	164
4	(Germany) RT Motorsports by SKM – Kawasaki (Germany) Battley–RT Motorsports by SKM–Kawasaki (Germany) Carl Cox–RT Motorsports by SKM–Kawasaki	69	2	3	3	Ret	5	Ret	Ret	9	**1**	**Ret**	**Ret**	**26**	3	Ret	155
4	(Germany) RT Motorsports by SKM – Kawasaki (Germany) Battley–RT Motorsports by SKM–Kawasaki (Germany) Carl Cox–RT Motorsports by SKM–Kawasaki	22	9	8	11	Ret	14	13	Ret	18	Ret	8	Ret	Ret	**Ret**	**7**	155
4	(Germany) RT Motorsports by SKM – Kawasaki (Germany) Battley–RT Motorsports by SKM–Kawasaki (Germany) Carl Cox–RT Motorsports by SKM–Kawasaki	44	DNQ	DNQ	DNQ	DNQ	DNQ	DNQ	21	Ret	DNQ	DNQ	14	Ret	Ret	19	155
4	(Germany) RT Motorsports by SKM – Kawasaki (Germany) Battley–RT Motorsports by SKM–Kawasaki (Germany) Carl Cox–RT Motorsports by SKM–Kawasaki	49													DNQ	DNQ	155
5	(Italy) Kawasaki GP Project	88	21	7	Ret	Ret	7	6	7	7	Ret	Ret	11	12	4	Ret	137
5	(Italy) Kawasaki GP Project	85	7	10	19	15	Ret	11	26	8	18	Ret	4	Ret	11	8	137
5	(Italy) Kawasaki GP Project	15	22	20	16	13	12	19	18	26	12	17	Ret	13	Ret	Ret	137
6	(Italy) Prodina Ircos Team WorldSSP300	8	Ret	Ret	7	6	3	24	6	5	4	13	Ret	Ret	1	3	113
6	(Italy) Prodina Ircos Team WorldSSP300	48	DSQ	DSQ	DSQ	DSQ	DSQ	DSQ	DSQ	DSQ	DSQ	DSQ	DSQ	DSQ	DSQ	DSQ	113
7	(Spain) Kawasaki Provec WorldSSP300	11	6	2	1	Ret	2	5	4	20							99
8	(France) Leader Team Flembbo	46	11	18	6	9	DNQ	DNQ	22	10	2	11	7	24	7	2	91
9	(Brazil) Team Brasil AD 78	83	**30**	**5**	8	Ret	8	4	10	12	15	5	Ret	DNS	9	5	90
9	(Brazil) Team Brasil AD 78	45	25	25	Ret	24	Ret	DNS	DNQ	DNQ	16	24	12	10	DNQ	DNQ	90
10	(Italy) Team Trasimeno	64	Ret	9	Ret	Ret	4	9	Ret	13	14	7	5	3	Ret	DNS	68
10	(Italy) Team Trasimeno	34									DNQ	DNQ					68
11	(Italy) ProGP Racing	99					11	Ret	8	11	28	9	13	6	16	10	51
11	(Italy) ProGP Racing	84	12	28	25	17	Ret	15	Ret	Ret	Ret	Ret	25	20	DNQ	DNQ	51
11	(Italy) ProGP Racing	98	Ret	27	Ret	14	Ret	20	DNQ	DNQ	DNQ	DNQ	18	21	20	Ret	51
11	(Italy) ProGP Racing	94	DNQ	DNQ	26	20											51
12	(Spain) 2R Racing	43									3	20	24	1	13	12	48
12	(Spain) 2R Racing	19					DSQ	DSQ	DSQ	DSQ							48
12	(Spain) 2R Racing	59					DNQ	DNQ	DNQ	DNQ	DNQ	DNQ	DNQ	DNQ			48
12	(Spain) 2R Racing	94													DNQ	DNQ	48
13	(Italy) Kawasaki ParkinGO Team	27	27	13	DNQ	DNQ	17	12	DNQ	DNQ	6	Ret	Ret	11	Ret	Ret	39
13	(Italy) Kawasaki ParkinGO Team	71	Ret	24	Ret	7	Ret	Ret	16	23	DNQ	DNQ	Ret	8	Ret	22	39
14	(Netherlands) EAB Ten Kate Racing	19									7	18	Ret	DNS	5	Ret	36
14	(Netherlands) EAB Ten Kate Racing	30	19	19	12	10	19	10	Ret	17							36
15	(Italy) Scuderia Maranga Racing	58	23	17	17	Ret	10	25	15	15	Ret	6	22	18			18
15	(Italy) Scuderia Maranga Racing	68	DNQ	DNQ	DNQ	DNQ	DNQ	DNQ	DNQ	DNQ	DNQ	DNQ	23	19			18
15	(Italy) Scuderia Maranga Racing	33					20	Ret							23	21	18
15	(Italy) Scuderia Maranga Racing	18	DNQ	DNQ			DNQ	DNQ	DNQ	DNQ	DNQ	DNQ	DNQ	DNQ	DNQ	DNQ	18
15	(Italy) Scuderia Maranga Racing	21			DNQ	DNQ											18
15	(Italy) Scuderia Maranga Racing	51													DNQ	DNQ	18
16	(Italy) Machado Came SBK	14	20	22	15	11	18	17	20	19	DNQ	DNQ	9	15	DNQ	DNQ	15
16	(Italy) Machado Came SBK	73	DNQ	DNQ	DNQ	DNQ	DNQ	DNQ	DNQ	DNQ	22	23	DNQ	DNQ	15	Ret	15
16	(Italy) Machado Came SBK	3	DNQ	DNQ	DNQ	DNQ	DNQ	DNQ	DNQ	DNQ	DNQ	DNQ	DNQ	DNQ	21	23	15
16	(Italy) Machado Came SBK	20	DNQ	DNQ	DNQ	DNQ	DNQ	DNQ									15
16	(Italy) Machado Came SBK	40							DNQ	DNQ							15
16	(Italy) Machado Came SBK	37									DNQ	DNQ	DNQ	DNQ	DNQ	DNQ	15
17	(Italy) GP Project	7	DSQ	DSQ	DNQ	DNQ	DSQ	DSQ	14	22	10	Ret	19	23	17	20	8
17	(Italy) GP Project	80	28	23	21	18	Ret	23	23	27	26	26					8
17	(Italy) GP Project	59													26	26	8
17	(Italy) GP Project	32											DNQ	DNQ			8
18	(Italy) Team BrCorse	26	DNQ	DNQ	14	22	16	21	17	30	21	19	16	28	25	11	7
19	(Czech Republic) Smrž Racing – Willi Race (Czech Republic) Smrž Racing by Blue Garage (Czech Republic) ACCR Smrž Racing by Blue Garage	2	13	Ret	13	19	15	18	24	29	23	Ret			Ret	26	7
19	(Czech Republic) Smrž Racing – Willi Race (Czech Republic) Smrž Racing by Blue Garage (Czech Republic) ACCR Smrž Racing by Blue Garage	47	DNQ	DNQ	DNQ	DNQ	DNQ	DNQ	DNQ	DNQ	DNQ	DNQ					7
19	(Czech Republic) Smrž Racing – Willi Race (Czech Republic) Smrž Racing by Blue Garage (Czech Republic) ACCR Smrž Racing by Blue Garage	65											DNQ	DNQ			7
19	(Czech Republic) Smrž Racing – Willi Race (Czech Republic) Smrž Racing by Blue Garage (Czech Republic) ACCR Smrž Racing by Blue Garage	76													DNQ	DNQ	7
20	(Czech Republic) ACCR Czech Talent Team – Willi Race	96							11	NC							5
20	(Czech Republic) ACCR Czech Talent Team – Willi Race	35											17	22	DNQ	DNQ	5
20	(Czech Republic) ACCR Czech Talent Team – Willi Race	63	DNQ	DNQ	DNQ	DNQ	DNQ	DNQ									5
20	(Czech Republic) ACCR Czech Talent Team – Willi Race	62									DNQ	DNQ					5
21	(Italy) OUTDO Kawasaki TPR	78									24	12					4
21	(Italy) OUTDO Kawasaki TPR	28									DNQ	DNQ					4
22	(Germany) Freudenberg KTM Junior Team	52	17	Ret	Ret	12											4
22	(Germany) Freudenberg KTM Junior Team	41	16	21	18	Ret											4
23	(Germany) Movisio by Freudenberg Jr Team	52					13	16	Ret	25	DNS	DNS					3
24	(Spain) DEZA–ISMABON Racing Team	81									29	14					2
25	(Italy) Team Chiodo Moto Racing	9	24	26	DNQ	DNQ	DNQ	DNQ	19	24	Ret	15	DNQ	DNQ			1
	(Spain) Alarxa Team Pons	42									17	22					0
	(Czech Republic) WRP Wepol Racing	53											Ret	27	Ret	17	0
	(Spain) ETG Racing	75									19	21					0
	(Germany) Freudenberg KTM WorldSSP Team	97	DNQ	DNQ	20	Ret											0
	(Germany) Freudenberg KTM WorldSSP Team	4	26	29	DNQ	DNQ											0
	(Italy) Gradacorse	16	DNQ	DNQ	22	23											0
	(Republic of Ireland) Team#109 Kawasaki	66	DNQ	DNQ	DNQ	DNQ	DNQ	DNQ	DNQ	DNQ	DNQ	DNQ	26	DNS			0
	(Republic of Ireland) Team#109 Kawasaki	86													DNQ	DNQ	0
	(Portugal) Team Tomás Alonso	79			DNS	Ret											0
	(France) TGP Racing	93	DNQ	DNQ	DNQ	DNQ	DNQ	DNQ	DNQ	DNQ	DNQ	DNQ	DNQ	DNQ	DNQ	DNQ	
	(France) TGP Racing	77	DNQ	DNQ	DNQ	DNQ	DNQ	DNQ	DNQ	DNQ	DNQ	DNQ	DNQ	DNQ	DNQ	DNQ	
	(France) Doré Racing Team	12	DNQ	DNQ	DNQ	DNQ	DNQ	DNQ	DNQ	DNQ			DNQ	DNQ			
	(Portugal) Stand Os Putos Racing Team	37			DNQ	DNQ											
	(Italy) Team Eleven	39											DNQ	DNQ			
	(Spain) I+Dent Racing Team	5									DNQ	DNQ					
	(Portugal) Kawasaki Rame Moto Racing Team	79													DNQ	DNQ	
Pos.	Team	Bike No.	JER (Spain)		POR (Portugal)		ARA (Spain)		ARA (Spain)		CAT (Spain)		MAG (France)		EST (Portugal)		Pts.

=== Manufacturers' championship ===
Pos.	Manufacturer	JER (Spain)		POR (Portugal)		ARA (Spain)		ARA (Spain)		CAT (Spain)		MAG (France)		EST (Portugal)		Pts
1	(Japan) Kawasaki	2	2	1	1	1	1	2	1	1	1	1	1	1	1	335
2	(Japan) Yamaha	1	1	5	2	4	3	1	3	7	5	3	3	5	4	227
3	(Austria) KTM	16	21	18	12											4
Pos.	Manufacturer	JER (Spain)		POR (Portugal)		ARA (Spain)		ARA (Spain)		CAT (Spain)		MAG (France)		EST (Portugal)		Pts
