= 2019 Supersport 300 World Championship =

2019 Supersport 300 World Championship
Previous:	2018	Next:	2020
Support series: Superbike World Championship; Supersport World Championship

The 2019 Supersport 300 World Championship season was the third season of the Supersport 300 World Championship of motorcycle racing.

== Race calendar and results ==
2019 calendar
Rnd	Country	Circuit	Date	Superpole	Fastest lap	Winning rider	Winning team
1	Spain	Motorland Aragón	7 April	(Spain) Manuel González	(Spain) Ana Carrasco	(Spain) Manuel González	Kawasaki ParkinGO Team
2	Netherlands	TT Circuit Assen	14 April	(Indonesia) Galang Hendra Pratama	(Italy) Omar Bonoli	(Spain) Manuel González	Kawasaki ParkinGO Team
3	Italy	Autodromo Enzo e Dino Ferrari	12 May	(Spain) Mika Pérez	Race cancelled due to torrential rain		
4	Spain	Circuito de Jerez	8 June	(Netherlands) Victor Steeman	(Indonesia) Galang Hendra Pratama	(Spain) Marc García	DS Junior Team
4	Spain	Circuito de Jerez	9 June	(Netherlands) Victor Steeman	(Netherlands) Koen Meuffels	(Spain) Manuel González	Kawasaki ParkinGO Team
5	Italy	Misano World Circuit Marco Simoncelli	23 June	(Spain) Manuel González	(Indonesia) Galang Hendra Pratama	(Spain) Ana Carrasco	Kawasaki Provec WorldSSP300
6	United Kingdom	Donington Park	7 July	(Brazil) Ton Kawakami	(France) Andy Verdoïa	(Italy) Kevin Sabatucci	Team Trasimeno Yamaha
7	Portugal	Algarve International Circuit	8 September	(Spain) Manuel González	(Spain) Manuel González	(Netherlands) Scott Deroue	Kawasaki MOTOPORT
8	France	Circuit de Nevers Magny-Cours	29 September	(Netherlands) Scott Deroue	(Netherlands) Scott Deroue	(Spain) Ana Carrasco	Kawasaki Provec WorldSSP300
9	Qatar	Losail International Circuit	26 October	(Spain) Ana Carrasco	(Spain) Ana Carrasco	(Netherlands) Scott Deroue	Kawasaki MOTOPORT

== Entry list ==
2019 entry list
Team	Constructor	Motorcycle	No.	Rider	Rounds
Kawasaki Provec WorldSSP300	Kawasaki	Kawasaki Ninja 400	1	(Spain) Ana Carrasco	All
A.S.D. Team Runner Bike	KTM	KTM RC 390 R	2	(Switzerland) Lee Doti	3
Team MHP Racing–Patrick Pons	Yamaha	Yamaha YZF-R3	3	(France) Matéo Pédeneau	1–8
Team MHP Racing–Patrick Pons	Yamaha	Yamaha YZF-R3	12	(France) Romain Doré	1–8
Team MHP Racing–Patrick Pons	Yamaha	Yamaha YZF-R3	14	(France) Enzo de la Vega	4–8
Team MHP Racing–Patrick Pons	Yamaha	Yamaha YZF-R3	33	(France) Kyrian Hartmann	1–8
2R Racing Team	Yamaha	Yamaha YZF-R3	4	(Italy) Emanuele Vocino	3
2R Racing Team	Kawasaki	Kawasaki Ninja 400	9	(France) Steffie Naud	6–8
2R Racing Team	Kawasaki	Kawasaki Ninja 400	11	(Italy) Kevin Arduini	1–5
2R Racing Team	Kawasaki	Kawasaki Ninja 400	57	(Belgium) Livio Loi	6–8
2R Racing Team	Kawasaki	Kawasaki Ninja 400	70	(France) Hugo Girardet	8
2R Racing Team	Kawasaki	Kawasaki Ninja 400	82	(Australia) Jack Hyde	1–5
GRADARA Corse	Yamaha	Yamaha YZF-R3	4	(Italy) Emanuele Vocino	5
DEZA – BOX 77 Racing	Kawasaki	Kawasaki Ninja 400	5	(Spain) Guillem Erill	1, 4
DEZA – BOX 77 Racing	Kawasaki	Kawasaki Ninja 400	73	(Spain) Alejandro Carrión	4
Kawasaki MOTOPORT	Kawasaki	Kawasaki Ninja 400	6	(Netherlands) Robert Schotman	1–6
Kawasaki MOTOPORT	Kawasaki	Kawasaki Ninja 400	17	(Netherlands) Koen Meuffels	7–9
Kawasaki MOTOPORT	Kawasaki	Kawasaki Ninja 400	95	(Netherlands) Scott Deroue	All
BCD Yamaha MS Racing	Yamaha	Yamaha YZF-R3	7	(Brazil) Ton Kawakami	1–8
BCD Yamaha MS Racing	Yamaha	Yamaha YZF-R3	10	(Spain) Unai Orradre	4
BCD Yamaha MS Racing	Yamaha	Yamaha YZF-R3	10	(Spain) Unai Orradre	7–9
BCD Yamaha MS Racing	Yamaha	Yamaha YZF-R3	25	(France) Andy Verdoïa	All
BCD Yamaha MS Racing	Yamaha	Yamaha YZF-R3	36	(Spain) Beatriz Neila	All
BCD Yamaha MS Racing	Yamaha	Yamaha YZF-R3	47	(Spain) Ferran Hernández Moyano	1–6
BCD Yamaha MS Racing	Yamaha	Yamaha YZF-R3	90	(United States) Dallas Daniels	9
Scuderia Maranga Racing	Kawasaki	Kawasaki Ninja 400	8	(Spain) Mika Pérez	1–7
Scuderia Maranga Racing	Kawasaki	Kawasaki Ninja 400	21	(Spain) Borja Sánchez	1–8
Scuderia Maranga Racing	Kawasaki	Kawasaki Ninja 400	38	(United Kingdom) Indy Offer	8
Carl Cox – RT Motorsports by SKM	Kawasaki	Kawasaki Ninja 400	8	(Spain) Mika Pérez	8
Carl Cox – RT Motorsports by SKM	Kawasaki	Kawasaki Ninja 400	44	(Australia) Tom Bramich	1–7 (Note: Tom Bramich was also entered into round 8 but was replaced by Mika Pérez after the first practice session due to injury.)
Flembbo Leader Team	Kawasaki	Kawasaki Ninja 400	9	(France) Steffie Naud	1–5
Flembbo Leader Team	Kawasaki	Kawasaki Ninja 400	14	(France) Enzo de la Vega	1–3
Flembbo Leader Team	Kawasaki	Kawasaki Ninja 400	46	(France) Samuel Di Sora	4–9
Flembbo Leader Team	Kawasaki	Kawasaki Ninja 400	49	(France) Dylan Delouvy	7–8
Flembbo Leader Team	Kawasaki	Kawasaki Ninja 400	94	(United Kingdom) Eunan McGlinchey	6
Nutec – RT Motorsports by SKM – Kawasaki	Kawasaki	Kawasaki Ninja 400	13	(South Africa) Dino Iozzo	1–8
Nutec – RT Motorsports by SKM – Kawasaki	Kawasaki	Kawasaki Ninja 400	20	(South Africa) Dorren Loureiro	1–6
Nutec – RT Motorsports by SKM – Kawasaki	Kawasaki	Kawasaki Ninja 400	22	(Ukraine) Nick Kalinin	All
Nutec – RT Motorsports by SKM – Kawasaki	Kawasaki	Kawasaki Ninja 400	26	(Australia) Joel Kelso	7
Nutec – RT Motorsports by SKM – Kawasaki	Kawasaki	Kawasaki Ninja 400	87	(New Zealand) Jacob Stroud	8
Prodina IRCOS Kawasaki	Kawasaki	Kawasaki Ninja 400	15	(Italy) Manuel Bastianelli	1–8
Prodina IRCOS Kawasaki	Kawasaki	Kawasaki Ninja 400	48	(Italy) Thomas Brianti	5
Prodina IRCOS Kawasaki	Kawasaki	Kawasaki Ninja 400	78	(France) Joseph Foray	1–8
Kawasaki GP Project	Kawasaki	Kawasaki Ninja 400	16	(Spain) Marc Luna Bayen	1–6
Kawasaki GP Project	Kawasaki	Kawasaki Ninja 400	23	(Italy) Paolo Giacomini	3–9
Kawasaki GP Project	Kawasaki	Kawasaki Ninja 400	32	(Czech Republic) Alexandra Pelikánová	1–8
Kawasaki GP Project	Kawasaki	Kawasaki Ninja 400	63	(Italy) Andrea Longo	7–8
Kawasaki GP Project	Kawasaki	Kawasaki Ninja 400	79	(Portugal) Tomás Alonso	1–2
Kawasaki GP Project	Kawasaki	Kawasaki Ninja 400	88	(Italy) Bruno Ieraci	All
Freudenberg KTM WorldSSP Team	KTM	KTM RC 390 R	17	(Netherlands) Koen Meuffels	1–6
Freudenberg KTM WorldSSP Team	KTM	KTM RC 390 R	31	(Germany) Toni Erhard	5
Freudenberg KTM WorldSSP Team	KTM	KTM RC 390 R	31	(Germany) Toni Erhard	8
Freudenberg KTM WorldSSP Team	KTM	KTM RC 390 R	52	(Czech Republic) Oliver König	9
Freudenberg KTM WorldSSP Team	KTM	KTM RC 390 R	92	(Germany) Tim Georgi	7
Freudenberg KTM WorldSSP Team	KTM	KTM RC 390 R	97	(Germany) Maximilian Kappler	All
Kawasaki ParkinGO Team	Kawasaki	Kawasaki Ninja 400	18	(Spain) Manuel González	All
Kawasaki ParkinGO Team	Kawasaki	Kawasaki Ninja 400	27	(Italy) Filippo Rovelli	All
Kawasaki ParkinGO Team	Kawasaki	Kawasaki Ninja 400	71	(Australia) Tom Edwards	All
Terra e Moto	Yamaha	Yamaha YZF-R3	19	(Chile) Benjamín Tomás Molina	1–8
Terra e Moto	Yamaha	Yamaha YZF-R3	30	(Poland) Daniel Blin	1–5, 7
Terra e Moto	Yamaha	Yamaha YZF-R3	68	(Italy) Jarno Ioverno	8
ProGP Racing	Yamaha	Yamaha YZF-R3	24	(Italy) Matteo Bertè	3, 5
Team Trasimeno Yamaha	Yamaha	Yamaha YZF-R3	28	(Italy) Omar Bonoli	1–6, 9
Team Trasimeno Yamaha	Yamaha	Yamaha YZF-R3	34	(Italy) Marco Carusi	7–8
Team Trasimeno Yamaha	Yamaha	Yamaha YZF-R3	35	(Netherlands) Finn de Bruin	1, 3–8
Team Trasimeno Yamaha	Yamaha	Yamaha YZF-R3	64	(France) Hugo De Cancellis	All
Team Trasimeno Yamaha	Yamaha	Yamaha YZF-R3	85	(Italy) Kevin Sabatucci	All
Team Evolution GREG06	Yamaha	Yamaha YZF-R3	29	(France) Grégory Carbonnel	8
STAND OS PUTOS Racing Team	Yamaha	Yamaha YZF-R3	37	(Portugal) Pedro Fragoso	7
DS Junior Team	Kawasaki	Kawasaki Ninja 400	39	(Spain) José Luis Pérez González	4–9
DS Junior Team	Kawasaki	Kawasaki Ninja 400	42	(Spain) Marc García	All
DS Junior Team	Kawasaki	Kawasaki Ninja 400	61	(Japan) Yuta Okaya	All
DS Junior Team	Kawasaki	Kawasaki Ninja 400	84	(Italy) Kim Aloisi	All
DS Junior Team	Kawasaki	Kawasaki Ninja 400	99	(Spain) Francisco Gómez	1–3
Freudenberg KTM Junior Team	KTM	KTM RC 390 R	41	(Germany) Jan-Ole Jähnig	All
Freudenberg KTM Junior Team	KTM	KTM RC 390 R	72	(Netherlands) Victor Steeman	All
Team Goeleven	Kawasaki	Kawasaki Ninja 400	43	(Italy) Stefano Raineri	8
Semakin Di Depan Biblion Motoxracing	Yamaha	Yamaha YZF-R3	45	(Indonesia) Muhammad Faerozi	9
Semakin Di Depan Biblion Motoxracing	Yamaha	Yamaha YZF-R3	55	(Indonesia) Galang Hendra Pratama	All
Semakin Di Depan Biblion Motoxracing	Yamaha	Yamaha YZF-R3	65	(Italy) Jacopo Facco	1–8
MTM Racing Team	Kawasaki	Kawasaki Ninja 400	51	(Netherlands) Dennis Koopman	5
MTM Racing Team	Kawasaki	Kawasaki Ninja 400	66	(Netherlands) Dion Otten	1–4, 6–9
MTM Racing Team	Kawasaki	Kawasaki Ninja 400	69	(Netherlands) Jeffrey Buis	All
ACCR Czech Talent Team – Willi Race	Kawasaki	Kawasaki Ninja 400	52	(Czech Republic) Oliver König	1–7
ACCR Czech Talent Team – Willi Race	Kawasaki	Kawasaki Ninja 400	67	(United Kingdom) Taylor Fox Moreton	8
ACCR Czech Talent Team – Willi Race	Kawasaki	Kawasaki Ninja 400	77	(Czech Republic) Vojtěch Schwarz	1–8
ACCR Czech Talent Team – Willi Race	Kawasaki	Kawasaki Ninja 400	96	(Czech Republic) Miloslav Hřava	7–8
Turkish Puccetti Racing by TSM	Kawasaki	Kawasaki Ninja 400	54	(Turkey) Bahattin Sofuoğlu	1–8
RM Racing	Kawasaki	Kawasaki Ninja 400	56	(Italy) Nicola Bernabè	5
Transmec KTM Racing Junior Team	KTM	KTM RC 390 R	58	(United Kingdom) Trystan Finocchiaro	6
AG Motorsport Italia Yamaha	Yamaha	Yamaha YZF-R3	60	(Italy) Gianluca Sconza	3
AG Motorsport Italia Yamaha	Yamaha	Yamaha YZF-R3	91	(Italy) Giacomo Mora	3, 5
Team XG Racing	Kawasaki	Kawasaki Ninja 400	74	(United Kingdom) Kade Verwey	6
Team XG Racing	Kawasaki	Kawasaki Ninja 400	76	(United Kingdom) Luke Verwey	6
Team Motoclube de Loulé Concelho	Kawasaki	Kawasaki Ninja 400	80	(Portugal) Vasco Correia Esturrado	7
Team Fouloi	Yamaha	Yamaha YZF-R3	81	(France) Sylvain Markarian	8
Ceolotto Moto Sport	Yamaha	Yamaha YZF-R3	86	(France) Enzo Ceolotto	8
TGP Racing	Honda	Honda CBR500R	93	(France) Adrien Quinet	1–8

Key
Regular rider
Wildcard rider
Replacement rider

- All entries used Pirelli tyres.

== Championship standings ==
Points

Position	**1st**	**2nd**	**3rd**	**4th**	**5th**	**6th**	**7th**	**8th**	**9th**	**10th**	**11th**	**12th**	**13th**	**14th**	**15th**
Points	25	20	16	13	11	10	9	8	7	6	5	4	3	2	1

=== Riders' championship ===
Pos.	Rider	Bike	ARA (Spain)	ASS (Netherlands)	IMO (Italy)	JER (Spain)		MIS (Italy)	DON (United Kingdom)	POR (Portugal)	MAG (France)	LOS (Qatar)	Pts.
1	(Spain) Manuel González	Kawasaki	**1**	1	C	4	1	**2**	DNS	**2**	2	4	161
2	(Netherlands) Scott Deroue	Kawasaki	3	2	C	2	23	7	DNQ	1	**3**	1	131
3	(Spain) Ana Carrasco	Kawasaki	Ret	8	C	3	3	1	19	3	1	**5**	117
4	(France) Andy Verdoïa	Yamaha	5	9	C	5	27	3	2	5	4	8	97
5	(Netherlands) Victor Steeman	KTM	6	10	C	**11**	**5**	5	4	10	9	Ret	69
6	(Spain) Marc García	Kawasaki	25	11	C	1	2	23	DNQ	4	11	Ret	68
7	(Indonesia) Galang Hendra Pratama	Yamaha	Ret	**19**	C	6	4	4	Ret	8	5	7	64
8	(Germany) Jan-Ole Jähnig	KTM	4	3	C	7	6	Ret	5	14	21	17	61
9	(France) Hugo De Cancellis	Yamaha	2	5	C	8	8	27	Ret	19	16	9	54
10	(Ukraine) Nick Kalinin	Kawasaki	14	4	DNQ	Ret	16	Ret	3	6	10	15	48
11	(Italy) Bruno Ieraci	Kawasaki	8	7	C	Ret	12	Ret	Ret	Ret	7	3	46
12	(Italy) Kevin Sabatucci	Yamaha	DNQ	DNQ	C	21	21	9	1	9	24	14	41
13	(Netherlands) Koen Meuffels	KTM	9	Ret	C	15	Ret	Ret	8				36
13	(Netherlands) Koen Meuffels	Kawasaki								Ret	Ret	2	36
14	(Netherlands) Jeffrey Buis	Kawasaki	16	13	C	9	14	15	22	Ret	8	12	25
15	(Australia) Tom Edwards	Kawasaki	19	Ret	C	14	9	24	Ret	11	Ret	6	24
16	(Italy) Omar Bonoli	Yamaha	7	6	C	DSQ	DSQ	DNQ	DSQ			Ret	19
17	(Netherlands) Dion Otten	Kawasaki	Ret	DNS	C	Ret	DNS		6	17	Ret	10	16
18	(Germany) Maximilian Kappler	KTM	10	15	C	Ret	11	18	Ret	13	15	Ret	16
19	(Italy) Manuel Bastianelli	Kawasaki	26	Ret	C	Ret	10	8	Ret	Ret	26		14
20	(France) Samuel Di Sora	Kawasaki				DNQ	DNQ	13	11	15	14	13	14
21	(Spain) Beatriz Neila	Yamaha	20	DNQ	C	20	13	DNQ	17	7	28	16	12
22	(Spain) Unai Orradre	Yamaha				10	Ret			16	19	11	11
23	(France) Enzo de la Vega	Kawasaki	Ret	Ret	C								11
23	(France) Enzo de la Vega	Yamaha				13	15	11	14	18	29		11
24	(Belgium) Livio Loi	Kawasaki							21	24	6		10
25	(Italy) Emanuele Vocino	Yamaha			C			6					10
26	(Spain) Mika Pérez	Kawasaki	15	17	**C**	16	7	17	20	DNS	Ret		10
27	(South Africa) Dino Iozzo	Kawasaki	17	Ret	C	17	Ret	DNQ	9	Ret	13		10
28	(Czech Republic) Oliver König	Kawasaki	DNQ	21	C	DNQ	DNQ	22	7	26			9
28	(Czech Republic) Oliver König	KTM										Ret	9
29	(Netherlands) Robert Schotman	Kawasaki	11	12	C	18	Ret	Ret	Ret				9
30	(France) Matéo Pédeneau	Yamaha	12	22	C	12	Ret	26	DNQ	27	DNQ		8
31	(Australia) Tom Bramich	Kawasaki	24	Ret	DNQ	25	24	Ret	10	28	WD		6
32	(Spain) Ferran Hernández Moyano	Yamaha	Ret	23	C	Ret	26	10	16				6
33	(Brazil) Ton Kawakami	Yamaha	22	Ret	C	Ret	19	16	**Ret**	22	12		4
34	(Australia) Joel Kelso	Kawasaki								12			4
35	(Spain) José Luis Pérez González	Kawasaki				DNQ	DNQ	25	12	DNQ	Ret	Ret	4
36	(South Africa) Dorren Loureiro	Kawasaki	Ret	16	C	19	17	12	Ret				4
37	(Italy) Paolo Giacomini	Kawasaki			DNQ	DNQ	DNQ	DNQ	13	23	20	19	3
38	(Italy) Filippo Rovelli	Kawasaki	13	DNQ	C	DNQ	DNQ	Ret	Ret	25	17	18	3
39	(Spain) Borja Sánchez	Kawasaki	DNQ	18	C	22	Ret	14	Ret	20	25		2
40	(Spain) Francisco Gómez	Kawasaki	21	14	DNQ								2
41	(Japan) Yuta Okaya	Kawasaki	DNQ	DNQ	DNQ	26	28	19	15	DNQ	22	Ret	1
	(Spain) Guillem Erill	Kawasaki	18			24	25						0
	(Spain) Marc Luna Bayen	Kawasaki	Ret	20	DNQ	23	18	DNQ	DNQ				0
	(Italy) Kim Aloisi	Kawasaki	DNQ	DNQ	DNQ	DNQ	DNQ	DNQ	18	DNQ	DNQ	DNS	0
	(France) Joseph Foray	Kawasaki	27	DNQ	C	DNQ	DNQ	DNQ	DNQ	DNQ	18		0
	(Italy) Jacopo Facco	Yamaha	Ret	DNQ	C	Ret	20	Ret	DNQ	DNQ	DNQ		0
	(Italy) Giacomo Mora	Yamaha			C			20					0
	(Indonesia) Muhammad Faerozi	Yamaha										20	0
	(Italy) Matteo Bertè	Yamaha			C			21					0
	(Poland) Daniel Blin	Yamaha	DNQ	24	DNQ	DNQ	DNQ	Ret		21			0
	(United States) Dallas Daniels	Yamaha										21	0
	(Spain) Alejandro Carrión	Kawasaki				Ret	22						0
	(Italy) Kevin Arduini	Kawasaki	23	Ret	DNQ	DNQ	DNQ	DNQ					0
	(Turkey) Bahattin Sofuoğlu	Kawasaki	Ret	DNQ	WD	DNQ	DNQ	DNQ	WD	Ret	23		0
	(Portugal) Tomás Alonso	Kawasaki	DNQ	25									0
	(Germany) Toni Erhard	KTM						DNQ			27		0
	(France) Adrien Quinet	Honda	DNQ	DNQ	DNQ	DNQ	DNQ	DNQ	DNQ	29	DNQ		0
	(Australia) Jack Hyde	Kawasaki	DNQ	Ret	DNQ	DNQ	DNQ	WD					0
	(France) Romain Doré	Yamaha	DNQ	DNQ	DNQ	DNQ	DNQ	DNQ	DSQ	DNQ	DNQ		0
	(Italy) Jarno Ioverno	Yamaha									Ret		
	(Czech Republic) Alexandra Pelikánová	Kawasaki	DNQ	DNQ	DNQ	DNQ	DNQ	DNQ	DNQ	DNQ	DNQ		
	(Chile) Benjamín Tomás Molina	Yamaha	DNQ	DNQ	DNQ	DNQ	DNQ	DNQ	DNQ	DNQ	DNQ		
	(France) Kyrian Hartmann	Yamaha	DNQ	DNQ	DNQ	DNQ	DNQ	DNQ	DNQ	DNQ	DNQ		
	(France) Steffie Naud	Kawasaki	DNQ	DNQ	DNQ	DNQ	DNQ	DNQ	DNQ	DNQ	DNQ		
	(Czech Republic) Vojtěch Schwarz	Kawasaki	DNQ	DNQ	DNQ	DNQ	DNQ	DNQ	DNQ	DNQ	DNQ		
	(Netherlands) Finn de Bruin	Yamaha	DNQ		DNQ	DNQ	DNQ	DNQ	DNQ	DNQ	DNQ		
	(Italy) Gianluca Sconza	Yamaha			DNQ								
	(Switzerland) Lee Doti	KTM			DNQ								
	(Netherlands) Dennis Koopman	Kawasaki						DNQ					
	(Italy) Nicola Bernabè	Kawasaki						DNQ					
	(Italy) Thomas Brianti	Kawasaki						DNQ					
	(United Kingdom) Luke Verwey	Kawasaki							DNQ				
	(United Kingdom) Kade Verwey	Kawasaki							DNQ				
	(United Kingdom) Trystan Finocchiaro	KTM							DNQ				
	(Portugal) Pedro Fragoso	Yamaha								DNQ			
	(Portugal) Vasco Correia Esturrado	Kawasaki								DNQ			
	(Italy) Andrea Longo	Kawasaki								DNQ	DNQ		
	(France) Dylan Delouvy	Kawasaki								DNQ	DNQ		
	(Italy) Marco Carusi	Yamaha								DNQ	DNQ		
	(Czech Republic) Miloslav Hřava	Kawasaki								DNQ	DNQ		
	(France) Enzo Ceolotto	Yamaha									DNQ		
	(France) Grégory Carbonnel	Yamaha									DNQ		
	(France) Hugo Girardet	Kawasaki									DNQ		
	(United Kingdom) Indy Offer	Kawasaki									DNQ		
	(New Zealand) Jacob Stroud	Kawasaki									DNQ		
	(Italy) Stefano Raineri	Kawasaki									DNQ		
	(France) Sylvain Markarian	Kawasaki									DNQ		
	(United Kingdom) Taylor Fox Moreton	Kawasaki									DNQ		
	(United Kingdom) Eunan McGlinchey	Kawasaki							WD				
	(Germany) TIM Georgi	KTM								WD			
Pos.	Rider	Bike	ARA (Spain)	ASS (Netherlands)	IMO (Italy)	JER (Spain)		MIS (Italy)	DON (United Kingdom)	POR (Portugal)	MAG (France)	LOS (Qatar)	Pts.

Colour	Result
Gold	Winner
Silver	Second place
Bronze	Third place
Green	Points classification
Blue	Non-points classification
Blue	Non-classified finish (NC)
Purple	Retired, not classified (Ret)
Red	Did not qualify (DNQ)
Red	Did not pre-qualify (DNPQ)
Black	Disqualified (DSQ)
White	Did not start (DNS)
White	Withdrew (WD)
White	Race cancelled (C)
Blank	Did not practice (DNP)
Blank	Did not arrive (DNA)
Blank	Excluded (EX)

**Bold** – Pole position
Italics – Fastest lap

=== Teams' championship ===
Pos.	Team	Bike No.	ARA (Spain)	ASS (Netherlands)	IMO (Italy)	JER (Spain)		MIS (Italy)	DON (United Kingdom)	POR (Portugal)	MAG (France)	LOS (Qatar)	Pts.
1	(Italy) Kawasaki ParkinGO Team	18	**1**	1	C	4	1	**2**	DNS	**2**	2	4	188
1	(Italy) Kawasaki ParkinGO Team	71	19	Ret	C	14	9	24	Ret	11	Ret	6	188
1	(Italy) Kawasaki ParkinGO Team	27	13	DNQ	C	DNQ	DNQ	Ret	Ret	25	17	18	188
2	(Netherlands) Kawasaki MOTOPORT	95	3	2	C	2	23	7	DNQ	1	**3**	1	160
2	(Netherlands) Kawasaki MOTOPORT	17								Ret	Ret	2	160
2	(Netherlands) Kawasaki MOTOPORT	6	11	12	C	18	Ret	Ret	Ret				160
3	(Germany) Freudenberg KTM Junior Team	72	6	10	C	**11**	**5**	5	4	10	9	Ret	130
3	(Germany) Freudenberg KTM Junior Team	41	4	3	C	7	6	Ret	5	14	21	17	130
4	(Spain) BCD Yamaha MS Racing	25	5	9	C	5	27	3	2	5	4	8	130
4	(Spain) BCD Yamaha MS Racing	36	20	DNQ	C	20	13	DNQ	17	7	28	16	130
4	(Spain) BCD Yamaha MS Racing	10				10	Ret			16	19	11	130
4	(Spain) BCD Yamaha MS Racing	47	Ret	23	C	Ret	26	10	16				130
4	(Spain) BCD Yamaha MS Racing	7	22	Ret	C	Ret	19	16	**Ret**	22	12		130
4	(Spain) BCD Yamaha MS Racing	90										21	130
5	(Spain) Kawasaki Provec WorldSSP300	1	Ret	8	C	3	3	1	19	3	1	**5**	117
6	(Italy) Team Trasimeno Yamaha	64	2	5	C	8	8	27	Ret	19	16	9	114
6	(Italy) Team Trasimeno Yamaha	85	DNQ	DNQ	C	21	21	9	1	9	24	14	114
6	(Italy) Team Trasimeno Yamaha	28	7	6	C	DSQ	DSQ	DNQ	DSQ			Ret	114
6	(Italy) Team Trasimeno Yamaha	35	DNQ		DNQ	DNQ	DNQ	DNQ	DNQ	DNQ	DNQ		114
6	(Italy) Team Trasimeno Yamaha	34								DNQ	DNQ		114
7	(Spain) DS Junior Team	42	25	11	C	1	2	23	DNQ	4	11	Ret	65
7	(Spain) DS Junior Team	39				DNQ	DNQ	25	12	DNQ	Ret	Ret	65
7	(Spain) DS Junior Team	99	21	14	DNQ								65
7	(Spain) DS Junior Team	61	DNQ	DNQ	DNQ	26	28	19	15	DNQ	22	Ret	65
7	(Spain) DS Junior Team	84	DNQ	DNQ	DNQ	DNQ	DNQ	DNQ	18	DNQ	DNQ	DNS	65
8	(Germany) Nutec – RT Motorsports by SKM – Kawasaki	22	14	4	DNQ	Ret	16	Ret	3	6	10	15	66
8	(Germany) Nutec – RT Motorsports by SKM – Kawasaki	13	17	Ret	C	17	Ret	DNQ	9	Ret	13		66
8	(Germany) Nutec – RT Motorsports by SKM – Kawasaki	20	Ret	16	C	19	17	12	Ret				66
8	(Germany) Nutec – RT Motorsports by SKM – Kawasaki	26								12			66
8	(Germany) Nutec – RT Motorsports by SKM – Kawasaki	87									DNQ		66
9	(Italy) Semakin Di Depan Biblion Motoxracing	55	Ret	**19**	C	6	4	4	Ret	8	5	7	64
9	(Italy) Semakin Di Depan Biblion Motoxracing	65	Ret	DNQ	C	Ret	20	Ret	DNQ	DNQ	DNQ		64
9	(Italy) Semakin Di Depan Biblion Motoxracing	45										20	64
10	(Italy) Kawasaki GP Project	88	8	7	C	Ret	12	Ret	Ret	Ret	7	3	49
10	(Italy) Kawasaki GP Project	23			DNQ	DNQ	DNQ	DNQ	13	23	20	19	49
10	(Italy) Kawasaki GP Project	16	Ret	20	DNQ	23	18	DNQ	DNQ				49
10	(Italy) Kawasaki GP Project	79	DNQ	25									49
10	(Italy) Kawasaki GP Project	32	DNQ	DNQ	DNQ	DNQ	DNQ	DNQ	DNQ	DNQ	DNQ		49
10	(Italy) Kawasaki GP Project	63								DNQ	DNQ		49
11	(Belgium) MTM Racing Team	69	16	13	C	9	14	15	22	Ret	8	12	41
11	(Belgium) MTM Racing Team	66	Ret	DNS	C	Ret	DNS		6	17	Ret	10	41
11	(Belgium) MTM Racing Team	51						DNQ					41
12	(Germany) Freudenberg KTM WorldSSP Team	17	9	Ret	C	15	Ret	Ret	8				32
12	(Germany) Freudenberg KTM WorldSSP Team	97	10	15	C	Ret	11	18	Ret	13	15	Ret	32
12	(Germany) Freudenberg KTM WorldSSP Team	31						DNQ			27		32
12	(Germany) Freudenberg KTM WorldSSP Team	52										Ret	32
12	(Germany) Freudenberg KTM WorldSSP Team	92								WD			32
13	(France) Team MHP Racing–Patrick Pons	14				13	15	11	14	18	29		19
13	(France) Team MHP Racing–Patrick Pons	3	12	22	C	12	Ret	26	DNQ	27	DNQ		19
13	(France) Team MHP Racing–Patrick Pons	12	DNQ	DNQ	DNQ	DNQ	DNQ	DNQ	DSQ	DNQ	DNQ		19
13	(France) Team MHP Racing–Patrick Pons	33	DNQ	DNQ	DNQ	DNQ	DNQ	DNQ	DNQ	DNQ	DNQ		19
14	(Italy) Prodina IRCOS Kawasaki	15	26	Ret	C	Ret	10	8	Ret	Ret	26		14
14	(Italy) Prodina IRCOS Kawasaki	78	27	DNQ	C	DNQ	DNQ	DNQ	DNQ	DNQ	18		14
14	(Italy) Prodina IRCOS Kawasaki	48						DNQ					14
15	(France) Flembbo Leader Team	46				DNQ	DNQ	13	11	15	14	13	14
15	(France) Flembbo Leader Team	14	Ret	Ret	C								14
15	(France) Flembbo Leader Team	9	DNQ	DNQ	DNQ	DNQ	DNQ	DNQ					14
15	(France) Flembbo Leader Team	49								DNQ	DNQ		14
15	(France) Flembbo Leader Team	94							WD				14
16	(Italy) Scuderia Maranga Racing	8	15	17	**C**	16	7	17	20	DNS			12
16	(Italy) Scuderia Maranga Racing	21	DNQ	18	C	22	Ret	14	Ret	20	25		12
16	(Italy) Scuderia Maranga Racing	38									DNQ		12
17	(Italy) GRADARA Corse	4						6					10
18	(Spain) 2R Racing Team	57							21	24	6		10
18	(Spain) 2R Racing Team	11	23	Ret	DNQ	DNQ	DNQ	DNQ					10
18	(Spain) 2R Racing Team	82	DNQ	Ret	DNQ	DNQ	DNQ	WD					10
18	(Spain) 2R Racing Team	9							DNQ	DNQ	DNQ		10
18	(Spain) 2R Racing Team	70									DNQ		10
18	(Spain) 2R Racing Team	4			C								10
19	(Czech Republic) ACCR Czech Talent Team – Willi Race	52	DNQ	21	C	DNQ	DNQ	22	7	26			9
19	(Czech Republic) ACCR Czech Talent Team – Willi Race	77	DNQ	DNQ	DNQ	DNQ	DNQ	DNQ	DNQ	DNQ	DNQ		9
19	(Czech Republic) ACCR Czech Talent Team – Willi Race	96								DNQ	DNQ		9
19	(Czech Republic) ACCR Czech Talent Team – Willi Race	67									DNQ		9
20	(Germany) Carl Cox – RT Motorsports by SKM	44	24	Ret	DNQ	25	24	Ret	10	28	WD		6
20	(Germany) Carl Cox – RT Motorsports by SKM	8									Ret		6
	(Spain) DEZA – BOX 77 Racing	5	18			24	25						0
	(Spain) DEZA – BOX 77 Racing	73				Ret	22						0
	(Italy) AG Motorsport Italia Yamaha	91			C			20					0
	(Italy) AG Motorsport Italia Yamaha	60			DNQ								0
	(Italy) ProGP Racing	24			C			21					0
	(Spain) Terra e Moto	30	DNQ	24	DNQ	DNQ	DNQ	Ret		21			0
	(Spain) Terra e Moto	68									Ret		0
	(Spain) Terra e Moto	19	DNQ	DNQ	DNQ	DNQ	DNQ	DNQ	DNQ	DNQ	DNQ		0
	(Italy) Turkish Puccetti Racing by TSM	54	Ret	DNQ	WD	DNQ	DNQ	DNQ	WD	Ret	23		0
	(France) TGP Racing	93	DNQ	DNQ	DNQ	DNQ	DNQ	DNQ	DNQ	29	DNQ		0
	(Switzerland) A.S.D. Team Runner Bike	2			DNQ								
	(Italy) RM Racing	56						DNQ					
	(United Kingdom) Team XG Racing	74							DNQ				
	(United Kingdom) Team XG Racing	76							DNQ				
	(United Kingdom) Transmec KTM Racing Junior Team	58							DNQ				
	(Portugal) STAND OS PUTOS Racing Team	37								DNQ			
	(Portugal) Team Motoclube de Loulé Concelho	80								DNQ			
	(France) Ceolotto Moto Sport	86									DNQ		
	(France) Team Evolution GREG06	29									DNQ		
	(Italy) Team Goeleven	43									DNQ		
	(France) Team Fouloi	81									DNQ		
Pos.	Team	Bike No.	ARA (Spain)	ASS (Netherlands)	IMO (Italy)	JER (Spain)		MIS (Italy)	DON (United Kingdom)	POR (Portugal)	MAG (France)	LOS (Qatar)	Pts.

=== Manufacturers' championship ===
Pos.	Manufacturer	ARA (Spain)	ASS (Netherlands)	IMO (Italy)	JER (Spain)		MIS (Italy)	DON (United Kingdom)	POR (Portugal)	MAG (France)	LOS (Qatar)	Pts.
1	(Japan) Kawasaki	1	1	C	1	1	1	3	1	1	1	216
2	(Japan) Yamaha	2	5	C	5	4	3	1	5	4	7	129
3	(Austria) KTM	4	3	C	7	5	5	4	10	9	17	86
	(Japan) Honda	DNQ	DNQ	DNQ	DNQ	DNQ	DNQ	DNQ	29	DNQ		0
Pos.	Manufacturer	ARA (Spain)	ASS (Netherlands)	IMO (Italy)	JER (Spain)		MIS (Italy)	DON (United Kingdom)	POR (Portugal)	MAG (France)	LOS (Qatar)	Pts.
