= Dean Berta Viñales =

Spanish motorcycle road racer (2006–2021)

- Nationality: Spanish
- Born: 20 April 2006; Palau-saverdera, Spain
- Died: 25 September 2021 (aged 15); Jerez de la Frontera, Spain
Motorcycle racing career statistics
Supersport 300 World Championship
Active years	2021
Manufacturers	Yamaha
Championships	0
2021 championship position	23rd (26 pts)
Starts / Wins / Podiums / Poles / F. laps / Points; 11 / 0 / 0 / 0 / 1 / 26

Dean Berta Viñales (20 April 2006 – 25 September 2021) was a Spanish professional motorcycle racer. He competed in the Supersport 300 World Championship for the Viñales Racing Team on a Yamaha YZF-R3.

Berta Viñales was the cousin of Maverick Viñales, a Moto3 world champion and Isaac Viñales, who has competed in the 125cc, Moto3, Moto2 and Supersport World Championships.

== Career ==
Berta Viñales debuted in the Supersport 300 World Championship in 2021, where he started in 11 races, reaching his best result in fourth place in the race held at the Circuit de Nevers Magny-Cours.

== Death ==
Berta Viñales died as a result of injuries sustained in an accident during the first race of the Jerez round. At Expo '92, there was a multi-rider crash, and after falling to the ground he was run over by other riders. He was the first Supersport 300 rider to die from injuries in a race.

At 3:11 p.m. on the same day of the accident, the organization published the following message on its social networks: We are deeply saddened to report the death of Dean Berta Viñales. The Superbike family sends their love to family, loved ones and their team. His personality, enthusiasm and commitment will be greatly missed. Everyone in motorcycle racing will miss you, Dean. Travel in peace.

== Legacy ==
Following three teenage deaths during the 2021 motorcycle road racing season (Jason Dupasquier at 19 years old during the Moto3 race at the 2021 Italian Grand Prix at the Mugello Circuit in May, Hugo Millán (14) during the European Talent Cup race at MotorLand Aragón circuit in July, and Dean Berta Viñales at 15) the organisers, the FIM and Dorna introduced new minimum-age requirements rising from 16 to 18 in major road racing competitions from 2023, together with reduced grid sizes and with other restrictions for lesser series.

== Career statistics ==
=== Supersport 300 World Championship ===
==== Races by year ====
(key) (Races in bold indicate pole position; races in italics indicate fastest lap)

Year	Bike	1	2	3	4	5	6	7	8	9	10	11	12	13	14	15	16	Pos	Pts
2021	Yamaha	SPA; 29	SPA; 27	ITA; 25	ITA; 20	NED	NED	CZE; 20	CZE; 16	FRA; 15	FRA; 4	SPA; 14	SPA; 6	SPA; Ret	SPA; DNS	POR	POR	23rd	26
