= Victor Steeman =

Dutch motorcycle racer (2000–2022)

- Nationality: Dutch
- Born: 15 June 2000; Zevenaar, Netherlands
- Died: 11 October 2022 (aged 22); Faro, Portugal
Motorcycle racing career statistics
Supersport 300 World Championship
Active years	2018–2022
Manufacturers	KTM, Kawasaki
Championships	0
2022 championship position	2nd (180 pts)
Starts / Wins / Podiums / Poles / F. laps / Points; 42 / 5 / 6 / 6 / 3 / 331

Victor Steeman (15 June 2000 – 11 October 2022) was a Dutch motorcycle racer. He competed in the Supersport 300 World Championship intermittently from 2018 until 2022 when he died from his injuries from a crash at the first race of Portimão round of that season.

== Biography ==
=== Supersport 300 World Championship ===
Born in Zevenaar, Steeman made his world debut in 2018 in the Supersport 300, participating in the last two races of the 2018 season as a replacement rider. Riding the KTM RC 390 R, he scored his first world championship point, and ended in fifteenth position in the Portimão race. The following season, he was brought in as a starting rider for the German team Freudenberg, riding a KTM. He had won first pole position in the Jerez event, which allowed him to start in the lead in both races held during the event. His best position during the season was in Donington with a fourth-place finish. He ended the season in fifth place in the overall standings.

In 2020, Steeman competed in the German IDM championship in the 600 class. He won both races in Assen and finished the season in fifth position. Steeman then returned for the 2021 season, with Freudenberg riding a KTM. During the Most round in the Czech Republic, Steeman had his second pole position and won his first race. He finished the season in tenth place in the standings.

=== Final season and death ===
In 2022, Steeman moved to the Dutch team MTM Kawasaki. During the Assen round, he won his fourth pole position and his second career victory. He won three more races with the possibility of becoming the overall champion. In the final round on 8 October at the Algarve International Circuit, he suffered a very serious accident in the first race and thus did not finish and was ruled out of the second race. He finished second in the overall standings. Steeman died three days later on 11 October in a hospital in Faro due to injuries sustained from that accident. He was 22 years old and the second World Supersport 300 rider to die from injuries in a race.

Two days after Steeman's death, his mother Flora van Limbeek died from a heart attack in Lathum, Zevenaar; she was 59 years old.

== Career statistics ==
=== Red Bull MotoGP Rookies Cup ===
==== Races by year ====
(key) (Races in bold indicate pole position; races in italics indicate fastest lap)

Year	1	2	3	4	5	6	7	8	9	10	11	12	13	Pos	Pts
2016	JER1; 17	JER2; 20	ASS1; 8	ASS2; Ret	SAC1; 19	SAC2; 16	RBR1; 22	RBR2; 23	BRN1; 16	BRN2; 22	MIS; 19	ARA1; 15	ARA2; 19	21st	9
2017	JER1; Ret	JER2; 12	ASS1; 17	ASS2; 12	SAC1; 23	SAC2; 11	BRN1; 15	BRN2; 9	RBR1; 17	RBR2; Ret	MIS; 12	ARA1; 15	ARA2; 14	18th	28

=== Supersport 300 World Championship ===
==== Races by year ====
(key) (Races in bold indicate pole position; races in italics indicate fastest lap)

Year	Bike	1	2	3	4	5	6	7	8	9	10	11	12	13	14	15	16	Pos	Pts
2018	KTM	ESP	NED	ITA	GBR	CZE	ITA	POR; 15	FRA; Ret									36th	1
2019	KTM	ARA; 6	ASS; 10	IMO; C	JER; **11**	JER; **5**	MIS; 5	DON; 4	POR; 10	FRA; 9	LOS; Ret							5th	69
2021	KTM	SPA; 26	SPA; 18	ITA; 14	ITA; 9	NED; **8**	NED; **8**	CZE; **1**	CZE; **4**	FRA; 8	FRA; 13	SPA; Ret	SPA; 25	SPA; 11	SPA; 19	POR; 29	POR; 14	10th	81
2022	Kawasaki	ARA; 4	ARA; 21	NED; **1**	NED; **8**	EST; 4	EST; 6	ITA; 5	ITA; 3	CZE; 15	CZE; 1	FRA; **NC**	FRA; **1**	CAT; **8**	CAT; **1**	POR; Ret	POR; DNS	2nd	180
