= 2022 Supersport 300 World Championship =

6th season of the Supersport 300 World Championship

2022 Supersport 300 World Championship
Previous:	2021	Next:	2023
Support series: Superbike World Championship; Supersport World Championship; Yamaha R3 bLU cRU World Cup

The 2022 Supersport 300 World Championship was the sixth season of the Supersport 300 World Championship. It started on April 8 at the MotorLand Aragón, and ended on October 9 at the Algarve International Circuit.

The championship was marred by the death of championship runner-up Victor Steeman, who suffered fatal injuries in an accident at the penultimate race of the season at the Algarve International Circuit.

== Race calendar and results ==
2022 calendar
Round		Country	Circuit	Date	Superpole	Fastest lap	Winning rider	Winning team	Ref
1	R1	Spain	MotorLand Aragón	9 April	(Spain) Marc García	(Spain) Marc García	(Spain) Marc García	Yamaha MS Racing	
1	R2	Spain	MotorLand Aragón	10 April	(Spain) Marc García	(Italy) Matteo Vannucci	(Spain) Álvaro Díaz	Arco Motor University Team	
2	R1	Netherlands	TT Circuit Assen	23 April	(Netherlands) Victor Steeman	(France) Samuel di Sora	(Netherlands) Victor Steeman	MTM Kawasaki	
2	R2	Netherlands	TT Circuit Assen	24 April	(Netherlands) Victor Steeman	(Japan) Yuta Okaya	(France) Hugo de Cancellis	Prodina Racing WorldSSP300	
3	R1	Portugal	Circuito do Estoril	21 May	(Japan) Yuta Okaya	(France) Samuel di Sora	(Spain) Marc García	Yamaha MS Racing	
3	R2	Portugal	Circuito do Estoril	22 May	(Japan) Yuta Okaya	(Czech Republic) Petr Svoboda	(France) Samuel di Sora	Leader Team Flembbo	
4	R1	Italy	Misano World Circuit Marco Simoncelli	11 June	(Italy) Matteo Vannucci	(Netherlands) Victor Steeman	(Italy) Matteo Vannucci	AG Motorsport Italia Yamaha	
4	R2	Italy	Misano World Circuit Marco Simoncelli	12 June	(Italy) Matteo Vannucci	(Germany) Lennox Lehmann	(Spain) Álvaro Díaz	Arco Motor University Team	
5	R1	Czech Republic	Autodrom Most	30 July	(Italy) Kevin Sabatucci	(Spain) Marc García	(Spain) Marc García	Yamaha MS Racing	
5	R2	Czech Republic	Autodrom Most	31 July	(Italy) Kevin Sabatucci	(Netherlands) Victor Steeman	(Netherlands) Victor Steeman	MTM Kawasaki	
6	R1	France	Circuit de Nevers Magny-Cours	10 September	(Netherlands) Victor Steeman	(Italy) Matteo Vannucci	(Italy) Matteo Vannucci	AG Motorsport Italia Yamaha	
6	R2	France	Circuit de Nevers Magny-Cours	11 September	(Netherlands) Victor Steeman	(Italy) Matteo Vannucci	(Netherlands) Victor Steeman	MTM Kawasaki	
7	R1	Spain	Circuit de Barcelona-Catalunya	24 September	(Netherlands) Victor Steeman	(Italy) Mirko Gennai	(Japan) Yuta Okaya	MTM Kawasaki	
7	R2	Spain	Circuit de Barcelona-Catalunya	25 September	(Netherlands) Victor Steeman	(Netherlands) Victor Steeman	(Netherlands) Victor Steeman	MTM Kawasaki	
8	R1	Portugal	Algarve International Circuit	8 October	(Germany) Dirk Geiger	(France) Samuel di Sora	(Germany) Dirk Geiger	Fusport-RT Motorsports by SKM-Kawasaki	
8	R2	Portugal	Algarve International Circuit	9 October	(Germany) Dirk Geiger	(Italy) Mirko Gennai	(Italy) Mirko Gennai	Team BRcorse	

== Entry list ==
2022 entry list
Team	Constructor	Motorcycle	No.	Rider	Rounds
MTM Kawasaki	Kawasaki	Ninja 400	72	(Netherlands) Victor Steeman	All
MTM Kawasaki	Kawasaki	Ninja 400	61	(Japan) Yuta Okaya	All
MTM Kawasaki	Kawasaki	Ninja 400	77	(Netherlands) Ruben Bijman	1–5, 7–8
MTM Kawasaki	Kawasaki	Ninja 400	7	(Hungary) Máté Számadó	6
Kawasaki GP Project	Kawasaki	Ninja 400	59	(Italy) Alessandro Zanca	All
Kawasaki GP Project	Kawasaki	Ninja 400	85	(Italy) Kevin Sabatucci	All
Molenaar Racing Team	Kawasaki	Ninja 400	78	(Netherlands) Thom Molenaar	2
Molenaar Racing Team	Kawasaki	Ninja 400	4	(Netherlands) Sven Doornenbal	2
Prodina Racing WorldSSP300	Kawasaki	Ninja 400	8	(Italy) Bruno Ieraci	All
Prodina Racing WorldSSP300	Kawasaki	Ninja 400	64	(France) Hugo De Cancellis	All
Prodina Racing WorldSSP300	Kawasaki	Ninja 400	25	(Italy) Mattia Martella	4
Team#109 Kawasaki	Kawasaki	Ninja 400	88	(Spain) Daniel Mogeda	All
Team#109 Kawasaki	Kawasaki	Ninja 400	43	(Australia) Harry Khouri	All
SMW Racing	Kawasaki	Ninja 400	58	(Spain) Iñigo Iglesias Bravo	All
SMW Racing	Kawasaki	Ninja 400	14	(Spain) Álex Millán	1, 3–8
SMW Racing	Kawasaki	Ninja 400	10	(Italy) Davide Conte	2
Accolade Smrž Racing	Kawasaki	Ninja 400	73	(Spain) José Luis Pérez González	5–8
Accolade Smrž Racing	Kawasaki	Ninja 400	53	(Czech Republic) Petr Svoboda	1–6
Accolade Smrž Racing	Kawasaki	Ninja 400	35	(Spain) Yeray Saiz Márquez	All
Fusport-RT Motorsports by SKM-Kawasaki	Kawasaki	Ninja 400	60	(Germany) Dirk Geiger	1–6, 8
Fusport-RT Motorsports by SKM-Kawasaki	Kawasaki	Ninja 400	7	(Hungary) Máté Számadó	7
Fusport-RT Motorsports by SKM-Kawasaki	Kawasaki	Ninja 400	69	(Philippines) Troy Alberto	All
Leader Team Flembbo	Kawasaki	Ninja 400	46	(France) Samuel Di Sora	All
Leader Team Flembbo	Kawasaki	Ninja 400	23	(France) Sylvain Markarian	All
Leader Team Flembbo	Kawasaki	Ninja 400	94	(France) Loris Chaidron	6
2R Racing	Kawasaki	Ninja 400	19	(Spain) Victor Rodríguez Nuñez	1
Rame Moto Racing	Kawasaki	Ninja 400	16	(Portugal) Dinis Borges	3, 8
Quaresma Racing Team	Kawasaki	Ninja 400	79	(Portugal) Tomás Alonso	3, 8
Genius Racing Team	Kawasaki	Ninja 400	92	(Czech Republic) Filip Feigl	5
ESP Solutions Motap Racing Team	Kawasaki	Ninja 400	48	(Spain) Julio Garcia González	7
Freudenberg KTM-Paligo Racing	KTM	RC 390 R	28	(Germany) Lennox Lehmann	All
Viñales Racing Team	Yamaha	YZF-R3	93	(Italy) Marco Gaggi	1–6, 8
Viñales Racing Team	Yamaha	YZF-R3	95	(Mexico) Adolfo Delgado	7
Viñales Racing Team	Yamaha	YZF-R3	47	(United Kingdom) Fenton Seabright	All
Yamaha MS Racing	Yamaha	YZF-R3	41	(Spain) Marc García	All
Yamaha MS Racing	Yamaha	YZF-R3	2	(Spain) Iker García Abella	All
Arco Motor University Team	Yamaha	YZF-R3	27	(Spain) Álvaro Díaz	All
Arco Motor University Team	Yamaha	YZF-R3	55	(Spain) Unai Calatayud	7
Team Trasimeno	Yamaha	YZF-R3	34	(Slovenia) Gasper Hudovernik	1
Team BRcorse	Yamaha	YZF-R3	26	(Italy) Mirko Gennai	All
Team BRcorse	Yamaha	YZF-R3	18	(United Kingdom) Indy Offer	1–5
Team BRcorse	Yamaha	YZF-R3	21	(Italy) Filippo Rovelli	6
Team BRcorse	Yamaha	YZF-R3	57	(Indonesia) Aldi Satya Mahendra	7
Team BRcorse	Yamaha	YZF-R3	89	(Indonesia) Wahyu Nugroho	8
ProGP Racing	Yamaha	YZF-R3	80	(Italy) Gabriele Mastroluca	1–7
ProGP Racing	Yamaha	YZF-R3	13	(Italy) Devis Bergamini	8
ProGP Racing	Yamaha	YZF-R3	81	(Greece) Ioannis Peristeras	2–8
AD78 Team Brasil by MS Racing	Yamaha	YZF-R3	12	(Brazil) Humberto Maier	All
AD78 Team Brasil by MS Racing	Yamaha	YZF-R3	87	(Brazil) Ton Kawakami	1–2, 4–6
AD78 Team Brasil by MS Racing	Yamaha	YZF-R3	39	(Brazil) Enzo Valentim Garcia	3, 7–8
AG Motorsport Italia Yamaha	Yamaha	YZF-R3	91	(Italy) Matteo Vannucci	All
VM Racing Team	Yamaha	YZF-R3	15	(Italy) Alfonso Coppola	4

Key
Regular rider
Replacement rider
Wildcard rider

== Championship standings ==
Points

Position	**1st**	**2nd**	**3rd**	**4th**	**5th**	**6th**	**7th**	**8th**	**9th**	**10th**	**11th**	**12th**	**13th**	**14th**	**15th**
Points	25	20	16	13	11	10	9	8	7	6	5	4	3	2	1

=== Riders' championship ===
Pos.	Rider	Bike	ARA (Spain)		ASS (Netherlands)		EST (Portugal)		MIS (Italy)		MOS (Czech Republic)		MAG (France)		CAT (Spain)		POR (Portugal)		Pts.
1	(Spain) Álvaro Díaz	Yamaha	2	1	11	2	6	26	2	1	3	2	3	2	2	4	7	2	259
2	(Netherlands) Victor Steeman^{†}	Kawasaki	4	21	**1**	**8**	4	6	5	3	15	1	**NC**	**1**	**8**	**1**	Ret	DNS	180
3	(France) Hugo De Cancellis	Kawasaki	12	12	5	1	27	7	9	4	2	15	Ret	4	4	2	2	5	171
4	(Spain) Marc García	Yamaha	**1**	**2**	6	8	1	5	12	13	1	9	2	20	18	21	10	15	164
5	(France) Samuel Di Sora	Kawasaki	14	7	2	7	2	1	3	Ret	13	4	6	13	14	22	9	9	146
6	(Italy) Mirko Gennai	Yamaha	8	6	3	6	25	3	Ret	7	14	Ret	Ret	5	10	3	5	1	140
7	(Japan) Yuta Okaya	Kawasaki	5	Ret	4	3	**3**	**8**	8	2	20	7	DNS	DNS	1	13	DNS	DNS	129
8	(Italy) Matteo Vannucci	Yamaha	7	Ret	7	12	8	14	**1**	**DNS**	5	12	1	16	16	16	6	3	123
9	(Germany) Lennox Lehmann	KTM	3	3	8	10	7	12	Ret	6	11	3	4	14	12	17	15	7	119
10	(Spain) Iñigo Iglesias Bravo	Kawasaki	6	5	Ret	16	Ret	2	6	12	DNS	DNS	5	10	Ret	10	4	Ret	91
11	(Germany) Dirk Geiger	Kawasaki	17	13	Ret	Ret	10	10	7	5	Ret	6	16	3			**1**	**18**	86
12	(Italy) Bruno Ieraci	Kawasaki	8	4	9	4	5	Ret	Ret	14	Ret	18	Ret	8	9	7	Ret	10	82
13	(Brazil) Humberto Maier	Yamaha	18	Ret	Ret	15	20	11	17	18	6	14	9	9	5	6	3	Ret	69
14	(Italy) Kevin Sabatucci	Kawasaki	15	9	12	14	12	4	24	8	**Ret**	**8**	Ret	6	13	11	Ret	13	68
15	(Netherlands) Ruben Bijman	Kawasaki	Ret	Ret	10	Ret	9	9	10	9	19	Ret			11	12	Ret	DNS	42
16	(Spain) José Luis Pérez González	Kawasaki									10	5	8	12	Ret	5	Ret	DNS	40
17	(Italy) Gabriele Mastroluca	Yamaha	Ret	15	Ret	5	22	16	16	11	Ret	20	10	11	6	14			40
18	(Czech Republic) Petr Svoboda	Kawasaki	19	11	Ret	17	26	17	11	Ret	24	11	11	7					29
19	(Spain) Daniel Mogeda	Kawasaki	21	17	19	20	17	22	20	20	4	13	13	18	Ret	15	13	11	28
20	(Brazil) Ton Kawakami	Yamaha	13	8	Ret	DNS			Ret	Ret	Ret	10	7	26					26
21	(Italy) Marco Gaggi	Yamaha	9	10	14	19	14	24	15	Ret	16	21	DNS	DNS			17	8	26
22	(Spain) Álex Millán	Kawasaki	16	DNS			11	15	14	17	Ret	Ret	20	17	17	19	12	4	25
23	(Spain) Julio García González	Kawasaki													3	9			23
24	(Italy) Alfonso Coppola	Yamaha							4	10									19
25	(Brazil) Enzo Valentim Garcia	Yamaha					18	Ret							21	24	8	6	18
26	(Indonesia) Aldi Satya Mahendra	Yamaha													7	8			17
27	(Spain) Iker García Abella	Yamaha	11	Ret	15	13	21	19	Ret	Ret	8	19	21	Ret	26	18	21	21	17
28	(Philippines) Troy Alberto	Kawasaki	Ret	20	21	25	23	18	18	15	9	24	12	15	19	23	Ret	Ret	13
29	(Spain) Yeray Saiz Márquez	Kawasaki	22	19	16	18	29	23	21	22	12	17	18	22	22	29	11	12	13
30	(Australia) Harry Khouri	Kawasaki	Ret	18	13	Ret	Ret	Ret	Ret	Ret	7	Ret	Ret	19	Ret	25	DNS	DNS	12
31	(Italy) Alessandro Zanca	Kawasaki	Ret	16	18	Ret	13	13	13	Ret	21	Ret	15	23	15	30	24	20	11
32	(France) Sylvain Markarian	Kawasaki	Ret	Ret	17	11	19	Ret	19	Ret	DNS	DNS	17	Ret	20	Ret	20	14	7
33	(Indonesia) Wahyu Nugroho	Yamaha															14	DNS	2
34	(Hungary) Máté Számadó	Kawasaki											14	27	23	27			2
35	(United Kingdom) Fenton Seabright	Yamaha	20	14	25	Ret	16	Ret	Ret	19	17	22	19	21	25	20	16	19	2
36	(Portugal) Dinis Borges	Kawasaki					15	21									19	17	1
	(Greece) Ioannis Peristeras	Yamaha			24	21	24	25	23	16	18	23	22	25	24	26	23	16	0
	(Czech Republic) Filip Feigl	Kawasaki									23	16							0
	(Italy) Devis Bergamini	Yamaha															18	Ret	0
	(Netherlands) Sven Doornenbal	Kawasaki			20	22													0
	(Portugal) Tomás Alonso	Kawasaki					Ret	20									22	Ret	0
	(United Kingdom) Indy Offer	Yamaha	24	22	26	26	28	27	22	21	22	Ret							0
	(Netherlands) Thom Molenaar	Kawasaki			22	23													0
	(Italy) Davide Conte	Kawasaki			23	24													0
	(Slovenia) Gašper Hudovernik	Yamaha	23	Ret															0
	(Italy) Filippo Rovelli	Yamaha											Ret	24					0
	(Mexico) Adolfo Delgado	Yamaha													27	28			0
	(Spain) Unai Calatayud	Yamaha													28	31			0
	(Spain) Víctor Rodríguez Nuñez	Kawasaki	Ret	Ret															0
	(Italy) Mattia Martella	Kawasaki							Ret	Ret									0
	(France) Loris Chaidron	Yamaha											DNS	DNS					0
Pos.	Rider	Bike	ARA (Spain)		ASS (Netherlands)		EST (Portugal)		MIS (Italy)		MOS (Czech Republic)		MAG (France)		CAT (Spain)		POR (Portugal)		Pts.

Colour	Result
Gold	Winner
Silver	Second place
Bronze	Third place
Green	Points classification
Blue	Non-points classification
Blue	Non-classified finish (NC)
Purple	Retired, not classified (Ret)
Red	Did not qualify (DNQ)
Red	Did not pre-qualify (DNPQ)
Black	Disqualified (DSQ)
White	Did not start (DNS)
White	Withdrew (WD)
White	Race cancelled (C)
Blank	Did not practice (DNP)
Blank	Did not arrive (DNA)
Blank	Excluded (EX)

**Bold** – Pole position
Italics – Fastest lap
† – Rider deceased

=== Teams' championship ===
Pos.	Team	Bike No.	ARA (Spain)		ASS (Netherlands)		EST (Portugal)		MIS (Italy)		MOS (Czech Republic)		MAG (France)		CAT (Spain)		POR (Portugal)		Pts.
Pos.	Team	Bike No.	R1	R2	R1	R2	R1	R2	R1	R2	R1	R2	R1	R2	R1	R2	R1	R2	Pts.
1	(Belgium) MTM Kawasaki	72	4	21	**1**	**8**	4	6	5	3	15	1	**NC**	**1**	**8**	**1**	Ret	DNS	312
1	(Belgium) MTM Kawasaki	61	5	Ret	4	3	**3**	**8**	8	2	20	7	DNS	DNS	1	13	DNS	DNS	312
1	(Belgium) MTM Kawasaki	77	Ret	Ret	10	Ret	9	9	10	9	19	Ret			11	12	Ret	DNS	312
1	(Belgium) MTM Kawasaki	7											14	27					312
2	(Spain) Arco Motor University Team	27	2	1	11	2	6	26	2	1	3	2	3	2	2	4	7	2	259
2	(Spain) Arco Motor University Team	55													28	31			259
3	(Italy) Prodina Racing WorldSSP300	64	12	12	5	1	27	7	9	4	2	15	Ret	4	4	2	2	5	253
3	(Italy) Prodina Racing WorldSSP300	8	8	4	9	4	5	Ret	Ret	14	Ret	18	Ret	8	9	7	Ret	10	253
3	(Italy) Prodina Racing WorldSSP300	25							Ret	Ret									253
4	(Spain) MS Racing	41	**1**	**2**	6	8	1	5	12	13	1	9	2	20	18	21	10	15	181
4	(Spain) MS Racing	2	11	Ret	15	13	21	19	Ret	Ret	8	19	21	Ret	26	18	21	21	181
5	(Italy) Team BrCorse	26	8	6	3	6	25	3	Ret	7	14	Ret	Ret	5	10	3	5	1	159
5	(Italy) Team BrCorse	57													7	8			159
5	(Italy) Team BrCorse	89															14	DNS	159
5	(Italy) Team BrCorse	18	24	22	26	26	28	27	22	21	22	Ret							159
5	(Italy) Team BrCorse	21											Ret	24					159
6	(France) Leader Team Flembbo	46	14	7	2	7	2	1	3	Ret	13	4	6	13	14	22	9	9	153
6	(France) Leader Team Flembbo	23	Ret	Ret	17	11	19	Ret	19	Ret	DNS	DNS	17	Ret	20	Ret	20	14	153
6	(France) Leader Team Flembbo	94											DNS	DNS					153
7	(Italy) AG Motorsport Italia Yamaha	91	7	Ret	7	12	8	14	**1**	**DNS**	5	12	1	16	16	16	6	3	123
8	(Germany) Freudenberg KTM-Paligo Racing	28	3	3	8	10	7	12	Ret	6	11	3	4	14	12	17	15	7	119
9	(Poland) SMW Racing	58	6	5	Ret	16	Ret	2	6	12	DNS	DNS	5	10	Ret	10	4	Ret	116
9	(Poland) SMW Racing	14	16	DNS			11	15	14	17	Ret	Ret	20	17	17	19	12	4	116
9	(Poland) SMW Racing	10			23	24													116
10	(Brazil) AD78 Team Brasil by MS Racing	12	18	Ret	Ret	15	20	11	17	18	6	14	9	9	5	6	3	Ret	113
10	(Brazil) AD78 Team Brasil by MS Racing	87	13	8	Ret	DNS			Ret	Ret	Ret	10	7	26					113
10	(Brazil) AD78 Team Brasil by MS Racing	39					18	Ret							21	24	8	6	113
11	(Germany) Fusport-RT Motorsports bu SKM-Kawasaki	60	17	13	Ret	Ret	10	10	7	5	Ret	6	16	3			**1**	**18**	99
11	(Germany) Fusport-RT Motorsports bu SKM-Kawasaki	69	Ret	20	21	25	23	18	18	15	9	24	12	15	19	23	Ret	Ret	99
11	(Germany) Fusport-RT Motorsports bu SKM-Kawasaki	7													23	27			99
12	(Czech Republic) Accolade Smrž Racing	73									10	5	8	12	Ret	5	Ret	DNS	82
12	(Czech Republic) Accolade Smrž Racing	53	19	11	Ret	17	26	17	11	Ret	24	11	11	7					82
12	(Czech Republic) Accolade Smrž Racing	35	22	19	16	18	29	23	21	22	12	17	18	22	22	29	11	12	82
13	(Italy) Kawasaki GP Project	85	15	9	12	14	12	4	24	8	**Ret**	**8**	Ret	6	13	11	Ret	13	79
13	(Italy) Kawasaki GP Project	59	Ret	16	18	Ret	13	13	13	Ret	21	Ret	15	23	15	30	24	20	79
14	(Italy) ProGP Racing	80	Ret	15	Ret	5	22	16	16	11	Ret	20	10	11	6	14			40
14	(Italy) ProGP Racing	81			24	21	24	25	23	16	18	23	22	25	24	26	23	16	40
14	(Italy) ProGP Racing	13															18	Ret	40
15	(Republic of Ireland) Team#109 Kawasaki	88	21	17	19	20	17	22	20	20	4	13	13	18	Ret	15	13	11	40
15	(Republic of Ireland) Team#109 Kawasaki	43	Ret	18	13	Ret	Ret	Ret	Ret	Ret	7	Ret	Ret	19	Ret	25	DNS	DNS	40
16	(Spain) Viñales Racing Team	93	9	10	14	19	14	24	15	Ret	16	21	DNS	DNS			17	8	28
16	(Spain) Viñales Racing Team	47	20	14	25	Ret	16	Ret	Ret	19	17	22	19	21	25	20	16	19	28
16	(Spain) Viñales Racing Team	95													27	28			28
17	(Spain) ESP Solutions Motap Racing Team	48													3	9			23
18	(Italy) VM Racing Team	15							4	10									19
19	(Portugal) Rame Moto Racing	16					15	21									19	17	1
	(Czech Republic) Genius Racing Team	92									23	16							0
	(Netherlands) Molenaar Racing Team	4			20	22													0
	(Netherlands) Molenaar Racing Team	78			22	23													0
	(Portugal) Quaresma Racing Team	79					Ret	20									22	Ret	0
	(Italy) Team Trasemino	34	23	Ret															0
	(Spain) 2R Racing	19	Ret	Ret															0
Pos.	Team	Bike No.	ASS (Netherlands)		BAR (Spain)		MIS (Italy)		IMO (Italy)		MOS (Czech Republic)		MAG (France)		ARA (Spain)		POR (Portugal)		Pts.

=== Manufacturers' championship ===
Pos.	Manufacturer	ARA (Spain)		ASS (Netherlands)		EST (Portugal)		MIS (Italy)		MOS (Czech Republic)		MAG (France)		CAT (Spain)		POR (Portugal)		Pts.
1	(Japan) Yamaha	1	1	3	2	1	3	1	1	1	2	1	2	2	3	3	1	344
2	(Japan) Kawasaki	4	4	1	1	2	1	3	2	2	1	5	1	1	1	1	4	326
3	(Austria) KTM	3	3	8	10	7	12	Ret	6	10	3	4	14	12	17	15	6	119
Pos.	Manufacturer	ARA (Spain)		ASS (Netherlands)		EST (Portugal)		MIS (Italy)		MOS (Czech Republic)		MAG (France)		CAT (Spain)		POR (Portugal)		Pts.
