= 2021 Supersport 300 World Championship =

5th season of the Supersport 300 World Championship

2021 Supersport 300 World Championship
Previous:	2020	Next:	2022
Support series: Superbike World Championship; Supersport World Championship

The 2021 Supersport 300 World Championship was the fifth season of the Supersport 300 World Championship of motorcycle racing.

The season was marred by the death of Dean Berta Viñales, who was killed in an accident at the first race of the Jerez round.

== Race calendar and results ==
2021 calendar
Round		Country	Circuit	Date	Superpole	Fastest lap	Winning rider	Winning team
1	R1	Spain	MotorLand Aragón	22 May	(Brazil) Ton Kawakami	(Spain) Ana Carrasco	(Spain) Adrián Huertas	MTM Kawasaki
1	R2	Spain	MotorLand Aragón	23 May	(Brazil) Ton Kawakami	(Brazil) Meikon Kawakami	(United Kingdom) Tom Booth-Amos	Fusport – RT Motorsports by SKM Kawasaki
2	R1	Italy	Misano World Circuit Marco Simoncelli	12 June	(Turkey) Bahattin Sofuoğlu	(Spain) Ana Carrasco	(Spain) Adrián Huertas	MTM Kawasaki
2	R2	Italy	Misano World Circuit Marco Simoncelli	13 June	(Turkey) Bahattin Sofuoğlu	(Spain) Unai Orradre	(Spain) Ana Carrasco	Kawasaki Provec WorldSSP300
3	R1	Netherlands	TT Circuit Assen	24 July (Note: The Assen round was originally due to take place on 23–25 April 2020. It was postponed to 23–25 July in response to the COVID-19 pandemic.)	(Netherlands) Victor Steeman	(Brazil) Meikon Kawakami	(Spain) Adrián Huertas	MTM Kawasaki
3	R2	Netherlands	TT Circuit Assen	25 July	(Netherlands) Victor Steeman	(Netherlands) Koen Meuffels	(United Kingdom) Tom Booth-Amos	Fusport – RT Motorsports by SKM Kawasaki
4	R1	Czech Republic	Autodrom Most	7 August (Note: The Most round was not originally in the 2021 calendar; it was added into the calendar on 29 April 2021.)	(Netherlands) Victor Steeman	(Spain) Adrián Huertas	(Netherlands) Victor Steeman	Freudenberg KTM WorldSSP Team
4	R2	Czech Republic	Autodrom Most	8 August	(Netherlands) Victor Steeman	(United Kingdom) Tom Booth-Amos	(Netherlands) Jeffrey Buis	MTM Kawasaki
5	R1	France	Circuit de Nevers Magny-Cours	4 September	(Spain) Adrián Huertas	(United Kingdom) Tom Booth-Amos	(Spain) Adrián Huertas	MTM Kawasaki
5	R2	France	Circuit de Nevers Magny-Cours	5 September	(Spain) Adrián Huertas	(Netherlands) Jeffrey Buis	(Spain) Adrián Huertas	MTM Kawasaki
6	R1	Spain	Circuit de Barcelona-Catalunya	18 September	(Spain) Iñigo Iglesias	(Spain) Dean Berta Viñales	(Netherlands) Jeffrey Buis	MTM Kawasaki
6	R2	Spain	Circuit de Barcelona-Catalunya	19 September	(Spain) Iñigo Iglesias	(Spain) Álvaro Díaz	(Turkey) Bahattin Sofuoğlu	Biblion Yamaha Motoxracing
7	R1	Spain	Circuito de Jerez	25 September	(Spain) Adrián Huertas	(Italy) Alessandro Zanca	(Netherlands) Jeffrey Buis	MTM Kawasaki
7	R2	Spain	Circuito de Jerez	26 September	(Spain) Adrián Huertas	(Uruguay) Facundo Llambías	(Turkey) Bahattin Sofuoğlu	Biblion Yamaha Motoxracing
8	R1	Portugal	Algarve International Circuit	2 October	(Spain) Adrián Huertas	(Germany) Dirk Geiger	(France) Samuel Di Sora	Leader Team Flembbo
8	R2	Portugal	Algarve International Circuit	3 October	(Spain) Adrián Huertas	(Netherlands) Ruben Bijman	(Spain) Adrián Huertas	MTM Kawasaki

== Entry list ==
2021 entry list
Team	Constructor	Motorcycle	No.	Rider	Rounds
MTM Kawasaki	Kawasaki	Ninja 400	1	(Netherlands) Jeffrey Buis	All
MTM Kawasaki	Kawasaki	Ninja 400	17	(Netherlands) Koen Meuffels	All
MTM Kawasaki	Kawasaki	Ninja 400	61	(Japan) Yuta Okaya	All
MTM Kawasaki	Kawasaki	Ninja 400	99	(Spain) Adrián Huertas	All
Kawasaki GP Project	Kawasaki	Ninja 400	2	(Spain) Alejandro Carrión	1–7 (Note: Alejandro Carrión competed in Friday practices during round 1, before being replaced by Álex Millán.)
Kawasaki GP Project	Kawasaki	Ninja 400	27	(Spain) Alejandro Díez	1–2
Kawasaki GP Project	Kawasaki	Ninja 400	59	(Italy) Alessandro Zanca	All
Kawasaki GP Project	Kawasaki	Ninja 400	65	(Hungary) Máté Számadó	4
Kawasaki GP Project	Kawasaki	Ninja 400	85	(Italy) Kevin Sabatucci	5–8
Kawasaki GP Project	Kawasaki	Ninja 400	98	(Spain) Álex Millán	1
Molenaar Racing Team	KTM	RC 390 R	4	(Netherlands) Sven Doornenbal	3
Molenaar Racing Team	KTM	RC 390 R	81	(Netherlands) Thom Molenaar	3
Viñales Racing Team	Yamaha	YZF-R3	5	(Netherlands) Twan Smits	3
Viñales Racing Team	Yamaha	YZF-R3	25	(Spain) Dean Berta Viñales	1–2, 4–7
Viñales Racing Team	Yamaha	YZF-R3	35	(Spain) Yeray Saiz Márquez	5–8
Viñales Racing Team	Yamaha	YZF-R3	76	(Spain) Julián Giral	1
Viñales Racing Team	Yamaha	YZF-R3	85	(Italy) Kevin Sabatucci	1–4
Machado Came SBK	Yamaha	YZF-R3	6	(Spain) Sara Sánchez	6
Machado Came SBK	Yamaha	YZF-R3	8	(Italy) Bruno Ieraci	1–3
Machado Came SBK	Yamaha	YZF-R3	19	(Spain) Víctor Rodríguez Nuñez	7
Machado Came SBK	Yamaha	YZF-R3	21	(Spain) Vicente Pérez	1–5, 8
Machado Came SBK	Yamaha	YZF-R3	30	(Italy) Niccolò Lisci	4
Machado Came SBK	Yamaha	YZF-R3	77	(Netherlands) Ruben Bijman	All
Machado Came SBK	Yamaha	YZF-R3	79	(France) Adrien Quinet	5
Machado Came SBK	Yamaha	YZF-R3	94	(Uruguay) Facundo Llambías	6–8
Outdo TPR Team Pedercini Racing	Kawasaki	Ninja 400	7	(France) Johan Gimbert	All
Prodina Team WorldSSP300	Kawasaki	Ninja 400	8	(Italy) Bruno Ieraci	7–8
Prodina Team WorldSSP300	Kawasaki	Ninja 400	41	(Spain) Marc García	5–8
Prodina Team WorldSSP300	Kawasaki	Ninja 400	48	(Italy) Thomas Brianti	1–4
Prodina Team WorldSSP300	Kawasaki	Ninja 400	64	(France) Hugo De Cancellis	1–6 (Note: Hugo De Cancellis competed in Friday practices during round 6, before being replaced by Mika Pérez.)
Prodina Team WorldSSP300	Kawasaki	Ninja 400	84	(Spain) Mika Pérez	6
GP3 by Pa.Sa.Ma.	Kawasaki	Ninja 400	9	(Chile) Isis Carreño	2
Yamaha MS Racing	Yamaha	YZF-R3	10	(Spain) Unai Orradre	1–4
Yamaha MS Racing	Yamaha	YZF-R3	28	(Spain) Yeray Ruiz	5–8
Yamaha MS Racing	Yamaha	YZF-R3	70	(Portugal) Miguel Santiago Duarte	All
Kawasaki Provec WorldSSP300	Kawasaki	Ninja 400	11	(Spain) Ana Carrasco	All
Genius Racing Team	Kawasaki	Ninja 400	12	(Czech Republic) Filip Feigl	4
Arco–Motor University Team	Yamaha	YZF-R3	13	(Spain) Álvaro Díaz	6–7
Team#109 Kawasaki	Kawasaki	Ninja 400	14	(Republic of Ireland) James McManus	1–4
Team#109 Kawasaki	Kawasaki	Ninja 400	88	(Spain) Daniel Mogeda	5–8
Team Trasimeno	Yamaha	YZF-R3	15	(Italy) Alfonso Coppola	2–8
Team Trasimeno	Yamaha	YZF-R3	16	(Spain) Beatriz Neila	1
SMW Racing	Kawasaki	Ninja 400	18	(United Kingdom) Indy Offer	1–3, 5–8
SMW Racing	Kawasaki	Ninja 400	22	(Argentina) Joel Romero	All
SMW Racing	Kawasaki	Ninja 400	33	(Spain) Óscar Núñez	4
SMW Racing	Kawasaki	Ninja 400	58	(Spain) Iñigo Iglesias	All
Accolade Smrž Racing	Kawasaki	Ninja 400	19	(Spain) Víctor Rodríguez Nuñez	1–6
Accolade Smrž Racing	Kawasaki	Ninja 400	56	(Czech Republic) Jonáš Kocourek	7–8
Accolade Smrž Racing	Kawasaki	Ninja 400	73	(Spain) José Luis Pérez González	All
Fusport – RT Motorsports by SKM Kawasaki	Kawasaki	Ninja 400	20	(South Africa) Dorren Loureiro	1–7
Fusport – RT Motorsports by SKM Kawasaki	Kawasaki	Ninja 400	43	(Australia) Harry Khouri	All
Fusport – RT Motorsports by SKM Kawasaki	Kawasaki	Ninja 400	60	(Germany) Dirk Geiger	8
Fusport – RT Motorsports by SKM Kawasaki	Kawasaki	Ninja 400	69	(United Kingdom) Tom Booth-Amos	1–6, 8
Leader Team Flembbo	Kawasaki	Ninja 400	23	(France) Sylvain Markarian	All
Leader Team Flembbo	Kawasaki	Ninja 400	46	(France) Samuel Di Sora	All
Team BRcorse	Yamaha	YZF-R3	26	(Italy) Mirko Gennai	All
Quaresma Racing	Kawasaki	Ninja 400	32	(Portugal) Tomás Alonso	8
GoEleven	Kawasaki	Ninja 400	36	(Italy) Stefano Raineri	1
2R Racing	Kawasaki	Ninja 400	41	(Spain) Marc García	1–2
2R Racing	Kawasaki	Ninja 400	44	(Germany) Christian Stange	3–5
2R Racing	Kawasaki	Ninja 400	45	(Belgium) Luca De Vleeschauwer	6
2R Racing	Kawasaki	Ninja 400	98	(Spain) Álex Millán	7–8
AC Racing	Kawasaki	Ninja 400	47	(Czech Republic) Matyáš Červenka	4
Movisio by MIE	Kawasaki	Ninja 400	52	(Czech Republic) Oliver König	All
WRP Wepol Racing	Yamaha	YZF-R3	53	(Czech Republic) Petr Svoboda	All
Biblion Yamaha Motoxracing	Yamaha	YZF-R3	54	(Turkey) Bahattin Sofuoğlu	All
Biblion Yamaha Motoxracing	Yamaha	YZF-R3	93	(Italy) Marco Gaggi	All
Chiodo Moto Racing	Kawasaki	Ninja 400	55	(Italy) Antonio Frappola	All
Alexy Moto Racing	Yamaha	YZF-R3	62	(France) Alexy Negrier	5
PMT Evolution	Kawasaki	Ninja 400	63	(France) Diego Poncet	5
Speed Master Racing Team	Kawasaki	Ninja 400	66	(Portugal) Dinis Borges	8
Freudenberg KTM WorldSSP Team	KTM	RC 390 R	72	(Netherlands) Victor Steeman	All
Freudenberg KTM WorldSSP Team	KTM	RC 390 R	82	(Germany) Lennox Lehmann	6
ProGP Racing	Yamaha	YZF-R3	80	(Italy) Gabriele Mastroluca	All
ProGP Racing	Yamaha	YZF-R3	97	(Italy) Filippo Palazzi	All
AD78 Team Brasil by MS Racing	Yamaha	YZF-R3	83	(Brazil) Meikon Kawakami	All
AD78 Team Brasil by MS Racing	Yamaha	YZF-R3	87	(Brazil) Ton Kawakami	All

Key
Regular rider
Wildcard rider
Replacement rider

- All entries used Pirelli tyres.

== Championship standings ==
Points

Position	**1st**	**2nd**	**3rd**	**4th**	**5th**	**6th**	**7th**	**8th**	**9th**	**10th**	**11th**	**12th**	**13th**	**14th**	**15th**
Points	25	20	16	13	11	10	9	8	7	6	5	4	3	2	1

=== Riders' championship ===
Pos.	Rider	Bike	ARA (Spain)		MIS (Italy)		ASS (Netherlands)		MOS (Czech Republic)		MAG (France)		BAR (Spain)		JER (Spain)		POR (Portugal)		Pts.
1	(Spain) Adrián Huertas	Kawasaki	1	3	1	10	1	5	6	5	**1**	**1**	7	4	**7**	**Ret**	**2**	**1**	255
2	(United Kingdom) Tom Booth-Amos	Kawasaki	2	1	2	17	Ret	1	8	2	2	2	Ret	DNS			5	2	189
3	(Netherlands) Jeffrey Buis	Kawasaki	6	12	28	7	3	4	7	1	25	3	1	7	1	4	Ret	28	174
4	(France) Samuel Di Sora	Kawasaki	5	8	Ret	3	4	3	4	Ret	3	12	Ret	3	6	Ret	1	Ret	148
5	(Japan) Yuta Okaya	Kawasaki	3	4	4	Ret	Ret	6	11	Ret	Ret	5	8	5	8	3	3	4	140
6	(Turkey) Bahattin Sofuoğlu	Yamaha	NC	Ret	**Ret**	**6**	5	32	5	Ret	Ret	Ret	2	1	3	1	4	17	131
7	(Spain) Iñigo Iglesias Bravo	Kawasaki	14	16	18	Ret	Ret	20	29	19	6	8	**6**	**10**	2	2	7	3	101
8	(Brazil) Meikon Kawakami	Yamaha	27	10	5	2	Ret	10	18	Ret	11	Ret	4	8	4	7	9	13	101
9	(Netherlands) Koen Meuffels	Kawasaki	8	Ret	11	12	2	9	14	8	12	Ret	13	18	14	12	8	6	85
10	(Netherlands) Victor Steeman	KTM	26	18	14	9	**8**	**8**	**1**	**4**	8	13	Ret	25	11	19	29	14	81
11	(Czech Republic) Oliver König	Kawasaki	38	29	24	8	13	23	3	6	21	22	Ret	13	10	11	12	7	64
12	(France) Hugo De Cancellis	Kawasaki	12	7	3	Ret	Ret	2	9	10	Ret	Ret	WD	WD					62
13	(Brazil) Ton Kawakami	Yamaha	**7**	**6**	12	Ret	9	14	Ret	14	9	Ret	3	Ret	Ret	Ret	16	19	57
14	(Spain) Alejandro Carrión	Kawasaki	WD	WD	27	Ret	11	16	2	3	Ret	20	10	9	Ret	22			54
15	(Italy) Mirko Gennai	Yamaha	18	21	6	24	Ret	7	10	7	17	14	Ret	Ret	16	6	23	8	54
16	(Spain) Ana Carrasco	Kawasaki	11	5	15	1	Ret	15	24	21	13	11	Ret	29	20	18	15	21	52
17	(South Africa) Dorren Loureiro	Kawasaki	15	11	16	5	7	11	19	17	4	9	26	17	18	16			51
18	(Italy) Gabriele Mastroluca	Yamaha	16	22	Ret	4	Ret	12	21	11	7	6	Ret	14	Ret	DNS	Ret	11	48
19	(Spain) Álvaro Díaz	Yamaha											5	2	5	DSQ			42
20	(Spain) Unai Orradre	Yamaha	4	2	Ret	22	10	25	Ret	Ret									39
21	(Italy) Bruno Ieraci	Yamaha	10	9	8	Ret	Ret	DNS											39
21	(Italy) Bruno Ieraci	Kawasaki													12	14	10	10	39
22	(Spain) Daniel Mogeda	Kawasaki									5	10	11	11	Ret	DNS	Ret	DNS	27
23	(Spain) Dean Berta Viñales^{†}	Yamaha	29	27	25	20			20	16	15	4	14	6	Ret	DNS			26
24	(Spain) Marc García	Kawasaki	13	15	13	Ret					20	15	18	Ret	9	5	26	29	26
25	(Spain) José Luis Pérez González	Kawasaki	19	13	Ret	11	Ret	Ret	12	Ret	10	Ret	Ret	16	Ret	DNS	Ret	9	25
26	(Spain) Yeray Ruiz	Yamaha									Ret	7	9	Ret	31	10	19	15	23
27	(Italy) Kevin Sabatucci	Yamaha	22	Ret	21	Ret	6	19	27	Ret									22
27	(Italy) Kevin Sabatucci	Kawasaki									19	17	19	22	Ret	13	11	12	22
28	(Germany) Dirk Geiger	Kawasaki															6	5	21
29	(Netherlands) Ruben Bijman	Yamaha	23	17	20	15	Ret	Ret	13	Ret	14	16	16	12	Ret	8	13	32	21
30	(Spain) Víctor Rodríguez Nuñez	Kawasaki	Ret	Ret	10	Ret	26	17	38	9	Ret	26	23	20					15
30	(Spain) Víctor Rodríguez Nuñez	Yamaha													15	15			15
31	(Australia) Harry Khouri	Kawasaki	9	28	DNS	DNS	12	31	22	15	Ret	Ret	Ret	15	Ret	DNS	24	18	13
32	(Italy) Filippo Palazzi	Yamaha	25	19	9	13	Ret	30	30	23	DNS	DNS	30	27	24	DNS	27	30	10
33	(Spain) Vicente Pérez	Yamaha	21	Ret	7	Ret	Ret	Ret	Ret	Ret	Ret	Ret					DNS	DNS	9
34	(Czech Republic) Petr Svoboda	Yamaha	30	20	Ret	19	Ret	13	16	12	Ret	18	15	Ret	23	Ret	Ret	22	8
35	(Uruguay) Facundo Llambías	Yamaha											27	19	19	9	Ret	DNS	7
36	(France) Johan Gimbert	Kawasaki	28	26	23	Ret	15	18	23	22	Ret	23	12	23	21	20	17	23	5
37	(Italy) Alfonso Coppola	Yamaha			Ret	DNS	14	Ret	28	25	29	24	25	26	26	Ret	14	Ret	4
38	(Italy) Alessandro Zanca	Kawasaki	17	23	22	16	16	22	26	18	16	19	22	28	13	17	18	20	3
39	(Spain) Óscar Núñez	Kawasaki							Ret	13									3
40	(Italy) Thomas Brianti	Kawasaki	Ret	25	17	14	Ret	21	17	27									2
41	(Spain) Álex Millán	Kawasaki	20	14											17	23	20	16	2
42	(Germany) Christian Stange	Kawasaki					Ret	Ret	15	Ret	18	30							1
	(Netherlands) Twan Smits	Yamaha					17	26											0
	(Germany) Lennox Lehmann	KTM											17	21					0
	(France) Sylvain Markarian	Kawasaki	Ret	Ret	Ret	18	Ret	24	25	28	23	21	24	Ret	27	Ret	25	25	0
	(Netherlands) Sven Doornenbal	KTM					18	28											0
	(Italy) Marco Gaggi	Yamaha	24	24	19	Ret	19	27	31	24	22	Ret	28	31	25	21	22	24	0
	(Netherlands) Thom Molenaar	KTM					20	29											0
	(Czech Republic) Filip Feigl	Kawasaki							32	20									0
	(Belgium) Luca De Vleeschauwer	Kawasaki											20	24					0
	(Italy) Antonio Frappola	Kawasaki	35	32	26	21	22	37	33	26	28	29	29	33	29	DNS	31	33	0
	(Republic of Ireland) James McManus	Kawasaki	36	30	31	25	21	35	35	30									0
	(Spain) Sara Sánchez	Yamaha											21	30					0
	(Portugal) Tomás Alonso	Kawasaki															21	27	0
	(United Kingdom) Indy Offer	Kawasaki	Ret	31	30	DNS	23	33			30	33	34	34	33	26	Ret	DNS	0
	(Argentina) Joel Romero	Kawasaki	34	Ret	Ret	Ret	24	34	Ret	31	31	31	31	Ret	30	25	33	35	0
	(Spain) Yeray Saiz Márquez	Yamaha									24	25	33	32	22	DNS	28	26	0
	(Czech Republic) Jonáš Kocourek	Kawasaki													28	24	30	34	0
	(Portugal) Miguel Santiago Duarte	Yamaha	37	Ret	32	23	25	36	37	Ret	DNQ	DNQ	35	35	32	27	32	36	0
	(France) Alexy Negrier	Yamaha									26	28							0
	(France) Diego Poncet	Kawasaki									27	32							0
	(France) Adrien Quinet	Yamaha									Ret	27							0
	(Spain) Alejandro Díez	Kawasaki	33	33	29	Ret													0
	(Italy) Niccolò Lisci	Yamaha							36	29									0
	(Spain) Beatriz Neila	Yamaha	31	DNS															0
	(Portugal) Dinis Borges	Kawasaki															Ret	31	0
	(Italy) Stefano Raineri	Kawasaki	32	Ret															0
	(Hungary) Máté Számadó	Kawasaki							34	32									0
	(Spain) Mika Pérez	Kawasaki											32	Ret					0
	(Chile) Isis Carreño	Kawasaki			33	Ret													0
	(Spain) Julián Giral	Yamaha	Ret	Ret															0
	(Czech Republic) Matyáš Červenka	Kawasaki							Ret	Ret									0
Pos.	Rider	Bike	ARA (Spain)		MIS (Italy)		ASS (Netherlands)		MOS (Czech Republic)		MAG (France)		BAR (Spain)		JER (Spain)		POR (Portugal)		Pts.

Colour	Result
Gold	Winner
Silver	Second place
Bronze	Third place
Green	Points classification
Blue	Non-points classification
Blue	Non-classified finish (NC)
Purple	Retired, not classified (Ret)
Red	Did not qualify (DNQ)
Red	Did not pre-qualify (DNPQ)
Black	Disqualified (DSQ)
White	Did not start (DNS)
White	Withdrew (WD)
White	Race cancelled (C)
Blank	Did not practice (DNP)
Blank	Did not arrive (DNA)
Blank	Excluded (EX)

**Bold** – Pole position
Italics – Fastest lap

=== Teams' championship ===
Pos.	Team	Bike No.	ARA (Spain)		MIS (Italy)		ASS (Netherlands)		MOS (Czech Republic)		MAG (France)		BAR (Spain)		JER (Spain)		POR (Portugal)		Pts.
Pos.	Team	Bike No.	R1	R2	R1	R2	R1	R2	R1	R2	R1	R2	R1	R2	R1	R2	R1	R2	Pts.
1	(Belgium) MTM Kawasaki	99	1	3	1	10	1	5	6	5	**1**	**1**	7	4	**7**	**Ret**	**2**	**1**	512
1	(Belgium) MTM Kawasaki	1	6	12	28	7	3	4	7	1	25	3	1	7	1	4	Ret	28	512
1	(Belgium) MTM Kawasaki	61	3	4	4	Ret	Ret	6	11	Ret	Ret	5	8	5	8	3	3	4	512
1	(Belgium) MTM Kawasaki	17	8	Ret	11	12	2	9	14	8	12	Ret	13	18	14	12	8	6	512
2	(Germany) Fusport-RT Motorsports by SKM Kawasaki	69	2	1	2	17	Ret	1	8	2	2	2	Ret	DNS			5	2	273
2	(Germany) Fusport-RT Motorsports by SKM Kawasaki	20	15	11	16	5	7	11	19	17	4	9	26	17	18	16			273
2	(Germany) Fusport-RT Motorsports by SKM Kawasaki	60															6	5	273
2	(Germany) Fusport-RT Motorsports by SKM Kawasaki	43	9	28	DNS	DNS	12	31	22	15	Ret	Ret	Ret	15	Ret	DNS	24	18	273
3	(Brazil) AD78 Team Brasil by MS Racing	83	27	10	5	2	Ret	10	18	Ret	11	Ret	4	8	4	7	9	13	158
3	(Brazil) AD78 Team Brasil by MS Racing	87	**7**	**6**	12	Ret	9	14	Ret	14	9	Ret	3	Ret	Ret	Ret	16	19	158
4	(France) Leader Team Flembbo	46	5	8	Ret	3	4	3	4	Ret	3	12	Ret	3	6	Ret	1	Ret	148
4	(France) Leader Team Flembbo	23	Ret	Ret	Ret	18	Ret	24	25	28	23	21	24	Ret	27	Ret	25	25	148
5	(Italy) Biblion Yamaha Motoxracing	54	NC	Ret	**Ret**	**6**	5	32	5	Ret	Ret	Ret	2	1	3	1	4	17	131
5	(Italy) Biblion Yamaha Motoxracing	93	24	24	19	Ret	19	27	31	24	22	Ret	28	31	25	21	22	24	131
6	(Poland) SMW Racing	58	14	16	18	Ret	Ret	20	29	19	6	8	**6**	**10**	2	2	7	3	104
6	(Poland) SMW Racing	33							Ret	13									104
6	(Poland) SMW Racing	18	Ret	31	30	DNS	23	33			30	33	34	34	33	26	Ret	DNS	104
6	(Poland) SMW Racing	22	34	Ret	Ret	Ret	24	34	Ret	31	31	31	31	Ret	30	25	33	35	104
7	(Italy) Prodina Team WorldSSP300	64	12	7	3	Ret	Ret	2	9	10	Ret	Ret	WD	WD					101
7	(Italy) Prodina Team WorldSSP300	41									20	15	18	Ret	9	5	26	29	101
7	(Italy) Prodina Team WorldSSP300	8													12	14	10	10	101
7	(Italy) Prodina Team WorldSSP300	48	Ret	25	17	14	Ret	21	17	27									101
7	(Italy) Prodina Team WorldSSP300	84											32	Ret					101
8	(Germany) Freudenberg KTM WorldSSP Team	72	26	18	14	9	**8**	**8**	**1**	**4**	8	13	Ret	25	11	19	29	14	81
8	(Germany) Freudenberg KTM WorldSSP Team	82											17	21					81
9	(Italy) Kawasaki GP Project	2	WD	WD	27	Ret	11	16	2	3	Ret	20	10	9	Ret	22			71
9	(Italy) Kawasaki GP Project	85									19	17	19	22	Ret	13	11	12	71
9	(Italy) Kawasaki GP Project	59	17	23	22	16	16	22	26	18	16	19	22	28	13	17	18	20	71
9	(Italy) Kawasaki GP Project	98	20	14															71
9	(Italy) Kawasaki GP Project	27	33	33	29	Ret													71
9	(Italy) Kawasaki GP Project	65							34	32									71
10	(Czech Republic) Movisio by MIE	52	38	29	24	8	13	23	3	6	21	22	Ret	13	10	11	12	7	64
11	(Spain) Yamaha MS Racing	10	4	2	Ret	22	10	25	Ret	Ret									62
11	(Spain) Yamaha MS Racing	28									Ret	7	9	Ret	31	10	19	15	62
11	(Spain) Yamaha MS Racing	70	37	Ret	32	23	25	36	37	Ret	DNQ	DNQ	35	35	32	27	32	36	62
12	(Spain) Machado Came SBK	8	10	9	8	Ret	Ret	DNS											59
12	(Spain) Machado Came SBK	77	23	17	20	15	Ret	Ret	13	Ret	14	16	16	12	Ret	8	13	32	59
12	(Spain) Machado Came SBK	21	21	Ret	7	Ret	Ret	Ret	Ret	Ret	Ret	Ret					DNS	DNS	59
12	(Spain) Machado Came SBK	94											27	19	19	9	Ret	DNS	59
12	(Spain) Machado Came SBK	19													15	15			59
12	(Spain) Machado Came SBK	6											21	30					59
12	(Spain) Machado Came SBK	79									Ret	27							59
12	(Spain) Machado Came SBK	30							36	29									59
13	(Italy) ProGP Racing	80	16	22	Ret	4	Ret	12	21	11	7	6	Ret	14	Ret	DNS	Ret	11	58
13	(Italy) ProGP Racing	97	25	19	9	13	Ret	30	30	23	DNS	DNS	30	27	24	DNS	27	30	58
14	(Italy) Team BRcorse	26	18	21	6	24	Ret	7	10	7	17	14	Ret	Ret	16	6	23	8	54
15	(Spain) Kawasaki Provec WorldSSP300	11	11	5	15	1	Ret	15	24	21	13	11	Ret	29	20	18	15	21	52
16	(Spain) Arco–Motor University Team	13											5	2	5	DSQ			42
17	(Czech Republic) Accolade Smrž Racing	73	19	13	Ret	11	Ret	Ret	12	Ret	10	Ret	Ret	16	Ret	DNS	Ret	9	38
17	(Czech Republic) Accolade Smrž Racing	19	Ret	Ret	10	Ret	26	17	38	9	Ret	26	23	20					38
17	(Czech Republic) Accolade Smrž Racing	56													28	24	30	34	38
18	(Spain) Viñales Racing Team	25	29	27	25	20			20	16	15	4	14	6	Ret	DNS			36
18	(Spain) Viñales Racing Team	85	22	Ret	21	Ret	6	19	27	Ret									36
18	(Spain) Viñales Racing Team	5					17	26											36
18	(Spain) Viñales Racing Team	35									24	25	33	32	22	DNS	28	26	36
18	(Spain) Viñales Racing Team	76	Ret	Ret															36
19	(Republic of Ireland) Team#109 Kawasaki	88									5	10	11	11	Ret	DNS	Ret	DNS	27
19	(Republic of Ireland) Team#109 Kawasaki	14	36	30	31	25	21	35	35	30									27
20	(Czech Republic) WRP Wepol Racing	53	30	20	Ret	19	Ret	13	16	12	Ret	18	15	Ret	23	Ret	Ret	22	8
21	(Spain) 2R Racing	41	13	15	13	Ret													8
21	(Spain) 2R Racing	44					Ret	Ret	15	Ret	18	30							8
21	(Spain) 2R Racing	98													17	23	20	16	8
21	(Spain) 2R Racing	45											20	24					8
22	(Italy) Outdo TPR Team Pedercini Racing	7	28	26	23	Ret	15	18	23	22	Ret	23	12	23	21	20	17	23	5
23	(Italy) Team Trasimeno	15			Ret	DNS	14	Ret	28	25	29	24	25	26	26	Ret	14	Ret	4
23	(Italy) Team Trasimeno	16	31	DNS															4
	(Netherlands) Molenaar Racing Team	4					18	28											0
	(Netherlands) Molenaar Racing Team	81					20	29											0
	(Czech Republic) Genius Racing Team	12					20	29											0
	(Italy) Chiodo Moto Racing	55	35	32	26	21	22	37	33	26	28	29	29	33	29	DNS	31	33	0
	(Portugal) Quaresma Racing	32															21	27	0
	(France) Alexy Moto Racing	62									26	28							0
	(France) PMT Evolution	63									27	32							0
	(Portugal) Speed Master Racing Team	66															Ret	31	0
	(Italy) GoEleven	36	32	Ret															0
	(Spain) GP3 by Pa.Sa.Ma.	9			33	Ret													0
	(Czech Republic) AC Racing	47							Ret	Ret									0
Pos.	Team	Bike No.	ARA (Spain)		MIS (Italy)		ASS (Netherlands)		MOS (Czech Republic)		MAG (France)		BAR (Spain)		JER (Spain)		POR (Portugal)		Pts.

=== Manufacturers' championship ===
Pos.	Manufacturer	ARA (Spain)		MIS (Italy)		ASS (Netherlands)		MOS (Czech Republic)		MAG (France)		BAR (Spain)		JER (Spain)		POR (Portugal)		Pts.
1	(Japan) Kawasaki	1	1	1	1	1	1	2	1	1	1	1	3	1	2	1	1	381
2	(Japan) Yamaha	4	2	5	2	5	7	5	7	7	4	2	1	3	1	4	8	233
3	(Austria) KTM	26	18	14	9	8	8	1	4	8	13	17	21	11	19	29	14	81
Pos.	Manufacturer	ARA (Spain)		MIS (Italy)		ASS (Netherlands)		MOS (Czech Republic)		MAG (France)		BAR (Spain)		JER (Spain)		POR (Portugal)		Pts.
