= Marc García (motorcyclist) =

Spanish motorcycle road racer

- Nationality: Spanish
- Born: 1 November 1999 (age 27); Terrassa, Spain
- Current team: KOVE Racing Team
- Bike number: 22
Motorcycle racing career statistics
Supersport 300 World Championship
Active years	2017–
Manufacturers	Yamaha, Kawasaki, Kove
Championships	1 (2017)
2024 championship position	4th (164 pts)
Starts / Wins / Podiums / Poles / F. laps / Points; 49 / 7 / 14 / 2 / 3 / 438

Marc García Ferrándiz (born 1 November 1999) is a Spanish professional motorcycle racer. He won the inaugural Supersport 300 World Championship in 2017.

== Career ==
In 2014, García made his debut in the Red Bull MotoGP Rookies Cup, a category he competed in until 2016. Furthermore, in 2015 and 2016, he occasionally participated in the Campeonato de España de Velocidad Moto3, with the bike built by the Monlau Repsol Technical School. In 2017, he competed with the Halcourier Racing team in the Supersport 300 World Championship, winning the title by one point over Alfonso Coppola. After the championship he took part in the last race, on the Valencia Circuit, of the Spanish national championship in the Moto3 class. In 2018, he continued his experience in the CEV Moto3 by participating as a starting rider, together with his teammate Davide Pizzoli, on board the Mahindra of the Max Racing Team, Max Biaggi's team.

In 2019, García returned to the Supersport 300 World Championship, with David Salom's DS Junior team, winning a Grand Prix and ending the season in sixth place in the drivers' standings. In 2020, he returned to the SS300 from mid-season, as a replacement rider with a Kawasaki Ninja 400 of the 2R team. He had one win and a third-place finish, closing the season in 16th place. He continued with the same team in 2021 as a starting driver, during the season he moved to the Prodina Ircos team as a replacement driver. he scored 26 points and finished the season in 24th place. In the same season he disputed two events at Misano and at Mugello in the Supersport 300 class of the Italian Speed championship, scoring 38 points and finishing 16th. In 2022, he was the starting rider in the SS300 with the Yamaha MS Racing team. He won three races and remained in the running for the title for a good part of the season, eventually finishing in fourth place. In the same season, he made his debut in the World Championship where competed in the British Grand Prix in the Moto 3 category. He replaced the injured Joel Kelso, finishing in 22nd place.

== Career statistics ==
=== FIM CEV Moto3 Junior World Championship ===
==== Races by year ====
(key) (Races in bold indicate pole position, races in italics indicate fastest lap)

Year	Bike	1	2	3	4	5	6	7	8	9	10	11	12	Pos	Pts
2015	Monlau	ALG	LMS	CAT1	CAT2	ARA1	ARA2	ALB	NAV	JER1	JER2	VAL1; Ret	VAL2; 17	NC	0
2016	BeOn	VAL1	VAL2	LMS	ARA	CAT1	CAT2	ALB; Ret	ALG	JER1	JER2	VAL1	VAL2	NC	0
2016	Honda	VAL1	VAL2	LMS	ARA	CAT1	CAT2	ALB	ALG	JER1	JER2	VAL1; Ret	VAL2; Ret	NC	0

=== Supersport 300 World Championship ===
==== Races by year ====
(key) (Races in bold indicate pole position; races in italics indicate fastest lap)

Year	Bike	1	2	3	4	5	6	7	8	9	10	Pos	Pts
2017	Yamaha	SPA; Ret	NED; 6	IMO; 1	GBR; 2	MIS; 6	LAU; 2	POR; 3	FRA; 1	**SPA**; 4		1st	139
2019	Kawasaki	SPA; 25	NED; 11	ITA; C	SPA; 1	SPA; 2	ITA; 23	GBR; DNQ	POR; 4	FRA; 11	QAT; Ret	6th	68

Year	Bike	1	2	3	4	5	6	7	8	9	10	11	12	13	14	15	16	Pos	Pts
2020	Kawasaki	SPA	SPA	POR	POR	SPA	SPA	SPA	SPA	SPA; 3	SPA; 20	FRA; 24	FRA; 1	POR; 13	POR; 12			16th	48
2021	Kawasaki	SPA; 13	SPA; 15	ITA; 13	ITA; Ret	NED	NED	CZE	CZE	FRA; 20	FRA; 15	SPA; 18	SPA; Ret	SPA; 9	SPA; 5	POR; 26	POR; 29	24th	26
2022	Yamaha	**ARA**; 1	**ARA**; 2	NED; 6	NED; 8	EST; 1	EST; 5	ITA; 12	ITA; 13	CZE; 1	CZE; 9	FRA; 2	FRA; 20	CAT; 18	CAT; 21	POR; 10	POR; 15	4th	164
2023	Kove	NED	NED	SPA	SPA	EMI	EMI	ITA; 8	ITA; 21	CZE; 8	CZE; Ret	FRA; 12	FRA; 14	SPA; Ret	SPA; DNS	POR; 25	POR; Ret	23rd	24
2024	Kove	BAR; 7	**BAR**; 18	ASS; 9	ASS; Ret	MIS; 4	MIS; 9	MOS; 2	MOS; 12	POR; 3	POR; 4	MAG; 14	MAG; 5	ARA; 20	ARA; 11	JER; 7	JER; 3	6th	132
