= Galang Hendra Pratama =

Indonesian motorcycle racer (born 1999)

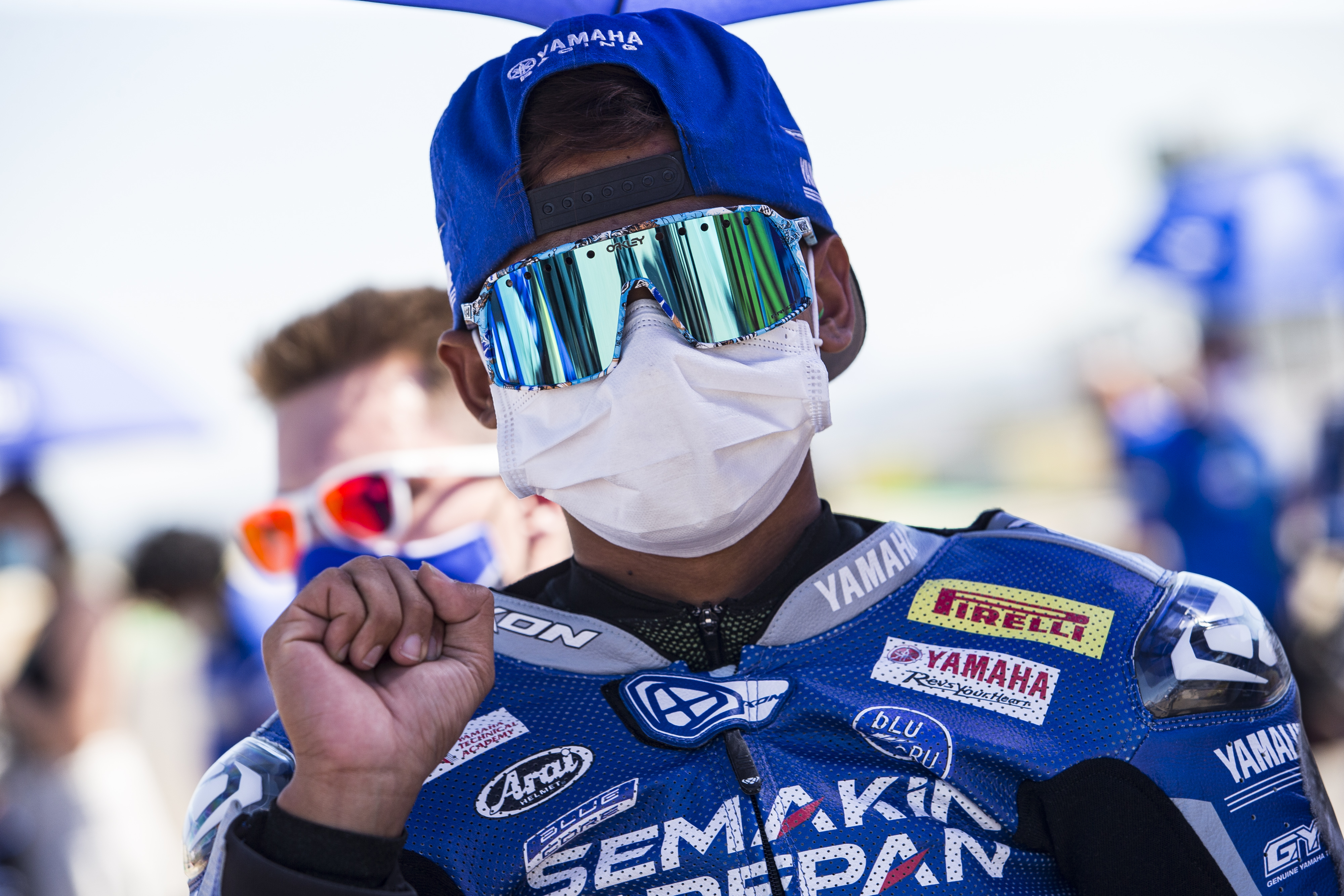
- Galang Hendra
- Nationality: Indonesian
- Born: 10 March 1999 (age 27); Yogyakarta, Indonesia
- Current team: ProGP NitiRacing
- Bike number: 56
Motorcycle racing career statistics
Supersport World Championship
Active years	2020–2021
Manufacturers	Yamaha
Championships	0
2021 championship position	21st (27 pts)
Starts / Wins / Podiums / Poles / F. laps / Points; 35 / 0 / 0 / 0 / 0 / 39
Supersport 300 World Championship
Active years	2017–2019, 2023–present
Manufacturers	Yamaha
Championships	0
2024 championship position	8th (127 pts)
Starts / Wins / Podiums / Poles / F. laps / Points; 45 / 2 / 4 / 3 / 2 / 306

Galang Hendra Pratama (born 10 March 1999) is an Indonesian motorcycle rider competing in Supersport World 300 Championship. He is the first Indonesian rider to win a motorcycle race on world championship level.

== Career ==
=== Early career ===
Pratama started racing at seven-years-old in local mini moto championships and motocross. He then switched to road race in early 2010. His achievements on these levels were good, as he won 2013 Motoprix in the beginner class, Yamaha Cup Race round 1 & 2, and Asean Cup Race runner up in MT class. The following year saw him reach runner-up in Indonesian Racing Series (IRS) Underbone 110cc and third in 125cc class. Pratama scored a total of three wins in the same classes in 2014 with two wins in 125cc class and once in 110cc class. He also competed in Yamaha Sunday Race and finished ninth overall in R25 Pro class.

Pratama participated in 2016 Pekan Olahraga Nasional, representing Special Region of Yogyakarta in Motorcycle Racing. He and Rheza Danica Ahrens earned gold in team 125cc Underbone A Class.

=== Asia Road Racing Championship ===
Pratama was recruited by Yamaha Racing Indonesia to compete in Asia Road Racing Championship AP250 class in 2015, aboard a Yamaha YZF-R25. In his maiden season, he finished top-ten in the standings, or ninth to be exact. For the following year, the Yogyakarta-born rider earned two podiums (second in race 2 at Chang International Circuit, and third in the fifth round at Buddh International Circuit). He ranked fifth at the end of season.

2017 saw Pratama's first win in the AP250 class at round 5 at Madras in race 2. Previously, he finished third in the first race. His victory ended Honda's winning streak at nine. In the overall standings, Pratama ranked sixth.

Pratama was called up to race in 2018 as a replacement of fellow Indonesian Muhammad Faerozi who was out due to an injury. He raced the final round of the season, ranked eighth in the first race and ninth in the second race.

=== Supersport 300 World Championship ===
==== 2017 ====
Through Yamaha Indonesia and Yamaha Europe connection, Pratama was sent to Italy to train at Valentino Rossi's VR46 Academy in 2016. He was also selected to race in the World Supersport 300 (WSS300) 2017 as a wildcard at Portimão round in Portugal, aboard a Yamaha YZF-R3. His first race did not go well as he failed to finish.

Pratama earned his second chance to race at round 9 at Jerez. Unexpectedly, he won the race and put himself in the record book as the first Indonesian rider to win a race on world championship level. This achievement raised many eyebrows as he only competed as a wild card and not expected to win the race on his first ever outing at the Spanish race track. He finished 14th in the standings with 25 points from two races.

==== 2018 ====
Galang's extraordinary results in the previous season secured him a full-time ride for the following season. He was contracted by BIBLION YAMAHA MOTOXRACING. In the first two races, he was struggling to get a decent results but he was able to overcome the issue by finishing top-ten at Imola, and Donington Park. Pratama scored another victory in WSS300 class by finishing first at Brno. In total, he achieved 53 points and reached tenth in the final riders' standings.

==== 2019 ====
Pratama once again appointed by Yamaha to race in 2019 World Supersport 300, having passed bLU cRU Masterclass selection. He completed the season in seventh position with 64 points.

=== Supersport World Championship ===
==== 2020 ====
After spending two full seasons in World Supersport 300, Pratama was confirmed to be promoted to Supersport World Championship alongside French rider Andy Verdoia, racing for bLU cRU Yamaha WorldSSP Team in 2020 season. He was the first Indonesian rider to race in the class since Doni Tata Pradita in 2009 season.

==== 2021 ====
Pratama moved to Ten Kate Racing for 2021 season to partner Dominique Aegerter.

=== Return to Asia Road Racing Championship ===
Pratama returned to race for Yamaha Indonesia in ARRC AP250 class for 2022 season.

=== Second stint at WSS300 ===
In 2023, Pratama made a return to WSS300 class to race in three rounds for MS Racing, the same team he raced for in 2020. He even raced in the Czech round at Autodrom Most of that season with his younger brother Aldi Satya Mahendra who raced as a wildcard for BrCorse, and his brother later won the second race.

For 2024 season, Pratama was scheduled to race for ProGP team.

== Personal life ==
Galang's parents are Dicky Hestu Prahendra (father) and Desi Prasanti (mother), both are retired motorcycle racers active locally in the 1990s. He is the eldest child of four siblings, one of his younger brothers is Aldi Satya Mahendra, also a motorcycle racer who won the Supersport 300 World Championship in 2024. His hobbies outside racing are playing videogames, cycling and music. He was graduated from SMPN 2 Sewon Bantul and SMA Gajah Mada Yogyakarta.

== Career statistics ==
=== Indoprix ===
==== Races by year ====
(key) (Races in bold indicate pole position; races in italics indicate fastest lap)

Year	Bike	1		2		3		4		5		Pos	Pts
Year	Bike	R1	R2	R1	R2	R1	R2	R1	R2	R1	R2	Pos	Pts
2014	Yamaha	SIK	SIK	SKY	SKY	SIK; 4	SIK; 16	SKY	SKY	BAL	BAL	19th	20

=== Supersport 300 World Championship ===
==== Races by year ====
(key) (Races in bold indicate pole position; races in italics indicate fastest lap)

Year	Bike	1	2	3	4	5	6	7	8	9	10	Pos	Pts
2017	Yamaha	SPA	NED	ITA	GBR	ITA	GER	POR; Ret	FRA	SPA; 1		14th	25
2018	Yamaha	SPA; 16	NED; Ret	ITA; 5	GBR; 9	**CZE**; 1	**ITA**; 7	POR; Ret	FRA; 15			10th	53
2019	Yamaha	SPA; Ret	**NED**; 19	ITA; C	SPA; 6	SPA; 4	ITA; 4	GBR; Ret	POR; 8	FRA; 5	QAT; 7	7th	64

Year	Bike	1	2	3	4	5	6	7	8	9	10	11	12	13	14	15	16	Pos	Pts
2023	Yamaha	NED	NED	SPA; 10	SPA; 11	EMI; 12	EMI; 12	ITA	ITA	CZE; Ret	CZE; 25	FRA; 16	FRA; 13	SPA; 12	SPA; 15	POR; 26	POR; 6	19th	37
2024	Yamaha	BAR; Ret	BAR; 7	ASS; 6	ASS; 5	MIS; Ret	MIS; 4	MOS; 13	MOS; 8	POR; 8	POR; 17	MAG; 3	MAG; 2	ARA; 4	ARA; DNS	JER; 8	JER; 8	8th	127
2025	Yamaha	POR	POR	NED	NED	CZE	CZE	EMI	EMI	FRA	FRA	ARA	ARA	EST	EST	SPA	SPA	NC*	0*

=== Supersport World Championship ===
==== Races by year ====
(key) (Races in bold indicate pole position, races in italics indicate fastest lap)

Year	Bike	1	2	3	4	5	6	7	8	9	10	11	12	13	14	15	16	17	18	19	20	21	22	23	24	Pos	Pts
2020	Yamaha	AUS; 16	SPA; Ret	SPA; 16	POR; 17	POR; 15	SPA; 16	SPA; 21	SPA; 12	SPA; 12	SPA; Ret	SPA; Ret	FRA; Ret	FRA; 13	POR; 16	POR; Ret										24th	12
2021	Yamaha	SPA; 15	SPA; 10	POR; 20	POR; 19	ITA; 13	ITA; 14	NED; 14	NED; Ret	CZE; 14	CZE; DNS	SPA; 11	SPA; Ret	FRA; Ret	FRA; 20	SPA; 13	SPA; 22	SPA; C	SPA; Ret	POR; 22	POR; 21	ARG	ARG	INA; Ret	INA; 13	21st	27

=== ARRC Supersports 600 ===
==== Races by year ====
(key) (Races in bold indicate pole position; races in italics indicate fastest lap)

Year	Bike	1		2		3		4		5		6		Pos	Pts
Year	Bike	R1	R2	R1	R2	R1	R2	R1	R2	R1	R2	R1	R2	Pos	Pts
2022	Yamaha	CHA; 6	CHA; 8	SEP; 8	SEP; 5	SUG; 7	SUG; 7	SEP; 7	SEP; 7	CHA; 12	CHA; 11			8th	82
2023	Yamaha	CHA; 9	CHA; Ret	SEP; Ret	SEP; 9	SUG; 8	SUG; 9	MAN; 8	MAN; Ret	ZHU; 7	ZHU; 7	CHA	CHA	10th*	55*

=== Mandalika Racing Series ===
==== Races by year ====
(key) (Races in bold indicate pole position; races in italics indicate fastest lap)

Year	Team	Bike	Class	Round 1			Round 2			Round 3			Round 4			Round 5			Pos	Pts
Year	Team	Bike	Class	R1	SP	R2	R1	SP	R2	R1	SP	R2	R1	SP	R2	R1	SP	R2	Pos	Pts
2023	Yamaha Baf Yamalube Akai Jaya MBKW2	Yamaha R25	National Sport 250cc	MAN1; 3		MAN2; 3	MAN1; 4		MAN2; 5	MAN1; 5		MAN2; 9							NA	NA
2024	YMH BAF Yamalube Akai Jaya MBKW2 Racing	Yamaha	National Sport 150cc	MAN1		MAN2	MAN1		MAN2	MAN1; 1		MAN2; 1	MAN1; 8		MAN2; 5	MAN1		MAN2	NA	NA
2024	YMH BAF Yamalube Akai Jaya MBKW2 Racing	Yamaha	National Sport 250cc	MAN1		MAN2	MAN2		MAN1; 2	MAN1; 5		MAN2; 3	MAN1; 7		MAN2; 5	MAN1		MAN2	NA	NA
2025	YMH BAF Yamalube Akai Jaya MBKW2 Racing	Yamaha	National Sport 150cc	MAN1		MAN2	MAN; 1	MAN; 10	MAN	MAN; Ret	MAN; 12	MAN; 17	MAN; Ret		MAN; Ret	MAN; 9		MAN; 18	NA	NA
2025	YMH BAF Yamalube Akai Jaya MBKW2 Racing	Yamaha	National Sport 250cc	MAN1; 6		MAN2; 11	MAN; 5	MAN; Ret	MAN; 5	MAN; 2	MAN; 8	MAN; DNS	MAN; 5		MAN; C	MAN; 6		MAN; 10	NA	NA

=== Asia Production 250 ===
==== Races by year ====
(key) (Races in bold indicate pole position, races in italics indicate fastest lap)

Year	Bike	1		2		3		4		5		6		Pos	Pts
Year	Bike	R1	R2	R1	R2	R1	R2	R1	R2	R1	R2	R1	R2	Pos	Pts
2024	Yamaha	CHA	CHA	ZHU	ZHU	MOT	MOT	MAN; 14	MAN; 9	SEP	SEP'l	CHA	CHA	26th*	9*
2025	Yamaha	CHA; 6	CHA; 5	SEP; 6	SEP; 3	MOT; Ret	MOT; 7	MAN; 4	MAN; 9	SEP; 4	SEP; 8	CHA; 4	CHA; 10	6th	116
2026	Yamaha	SEP; 12	SEP; 7	CHA; Ret	CHA; 13	MOT; 10	MOT; 10	MAN	MAN	SEP	SEP	CHA	CHA	13th*	28*
