= Carter Thompson =

Australian motorcycle racer (born 2007)

- Born: 29 November 2007 (age 18); New Lambton Heights, Australia
- Nationality: Australian
- Current team: Team BrCorse
- Bike number: 50
Statistics
Sportbike World Championship
Active years	2026–
Championships	0
Manufacturer	Yamaha (2026–)
Starts / Wins / Podiums / Poles / F. laps / Points; 16 / 2 / 6 / 1 / 3 / 193
Supersport 300 World Championship
Active years	2024–2025
Championships	0
Manufacturer	Kawasaki
Best season (2025)	2nd (213 pts)
Starts / Wins / Podiums / Poles / F. laps / Points; 24 / 3 / 8 / 1 / 3 / 275

Carter William James Thompson (born 29 November 2007) is an Australian motorcycle racer who competes in the Sportbike World Championship for Team BrCorse. He was Supersport 300 World Championship runner-up in 2025.

Thompson is an Asia Talent Cup and Red Bull MotoGP Rookies Cup graduate, having competed there between 2021 and 2025.

== Career ==
=== Early career ===
Born in New South Wales, Thompson began riding dirt bikes at the age of four, and would later transition to road racing aged 10 after receiving a road bike for his birthday. The following year, in 2019, Thompson entered the Oceania Junior Cup, a championship following the Australian Superbike Championship's calendar, which used series-specified Yamaha YZF-R15 machines. Thompson won the opening round's triple header at Wakefield, followed by a fourth win at Broadford, and clinched the title at the final round at Sydney.

In 2020, Thompson competed in both Yamaha R3 Cup and Supersport 300 of the Australian Superbike Championship. In the R3 Cup, he won four out of five races and was consequently crowned champion. Meanwhile in Supersport 300, Thompson won two races and clinched three podiums in total, ranking seventh overall, despite not participating in the opening round at Phillip Island.

=== Asia and European Talent Cup (2021–2023) ===
At the age of 13, Thompson was selected to compete in the 2021 Asia Talent Cup season. In his rookie year, he neared the podium positions and managed three fourth-place finishes as best results, ranking fourth overall at the end of the season. In 2022, Thompson clinched his maiden Cup podium at Buriram, following a slow start to the season. He later earned his maiden win in the next round at Sepang in front of Rei Wakamatsu, and finished the season with a third podium at Mandalika—ranking fifth overall.

In 2022 he also competed full-time in the European Talent Cup with AGR Team, where his best race was at Aragon with a sixth place finish. He returned to the Cup in 2023 with three wildcard appearances at Estoril, Portimao and Barcelona.

=== Red Bull Rookies Cup and Supersport 300 (2023–2025) ===
Thompson was selected to compete in the 2023 Red Bull MotoGP Rookies Cup, and made it to the top-ten in two occasions throughout the season at Le Mans and Assen. He ranked 19th overall, despite missing the Mugello round due to a broken collarbone. He returned for a second season in 2024, where he managed to finish in the top-ten consistently and earned his Cup-best finishes at Aragon with two sixth-places.

Halfway through his 2024 season, Thompson was called up for replacement appearances in the Supersport 300 World Championship with Füsport, at Most and Portimão. In his debut race in the championship, Thompson finished in third place on his Kawasaki Ninja 400, and later clinched another podium at Portimão, this time with a second place. Following his impressive results in his sporadic appearances, Thompson signed a full-time contract with MTM Kawasaki for the 2025 season.

In his third and final year in the Rookies Cup, Thompson clinched his maiden victory in the opening round at Jerez, and finished the season in ninth place overall. In 2025, he also faced his first full-time Supersport 300 season, where he earned his maiden win at the Misano round. He followed up with several consecutive podiums at Magny-Cours, Aragon and Estoril, including two more victories—and arrived to the final round at Jerez in championship contention, ten points behind leader Beñat Fernández. Thompson ultimately took second place in the standings following a final race win from Fernández.

=== Sportbike World Championship (2026–) ===
In November 2025, Thompson signed with Team BrCorse to race in the newly established Sportbike World Championship in 2026, aboard a Yamaha YZF-R7. Following a slow start to the season, he broke through the podium spots and clinched a second place at Aragon. He claimed several more podiums in the following rounds, clinched his maiden win in the penultimate round at Cremona, and doubled down in the final race at Jerez. He finished in third place overall, as the top-ranked Yamaha, and was confirmed to remain with the same team for 2027 shortly after, with Noah Dettwiler joining him as his teammate.

== Career statistics ==
=== Australian Superbike Championship ===
==== Races by year ====
(key) (Races in bold indicate pole position; races in italics indicate fastest lap)

Year	Class	Bike	1			2			3			4			5			6			Pos	Pts
Year	Class	Bike	R1	R2	R3	R1	R2	R3	R1	R2	R3	R1	R2	R3	R1	R2	R3	R1	R2	R3	Pos	Pts
2019	Oceania Jr Cup	Yamaha	WAK; 1	**WAK**; 1	WAK; 1	BRO; 5	BRO; 6	BRO; 1	MOR; 6	MOR; 6	MOR; 3	WIN; 4	WIN; 7	WIN; 2	PHI; 2	PHI; 3	PHI; 1	SYD; 4	SYD; 7	SYD; 11	1st	334
2020	Yamaha R3 Cup	Yamaha				**WAK**; 1	**WAK**; 1	**WAK**; 1	WAK; DNS	WAK; 1											1st	100
2020	Supersport 300	Yamaha	PHI	PHI	PHI	**WAK**; 1	**WAK**; 3	**WAK**; 1	WAK; Ret	WAK; 15											7th	75
2021	Supersport 300	Yamaha	**WIN**; 1	**WIN**; 1	**WIN**; 1	WAK	WAK	WAK	BEN	BEN	BEN										11th	76

=== Asia Talent Cup ===
==== Races by year ====
(key) (Races in bold indicate pole position; races in italics indicate fastest lap)

Year	Bike	1		2		3		4		5		6		Pos	Pts
Year	Bike	R1	R2	R1	R2	R1	R2	R1	R2	R1	R2	R1	R2	Pos	Pts
2021	Honda	LUS; 4	LUS; 7	LUS; 5	LUS; 4	MAN; 4	MAN; 5	MAN; Ret	MAN; C					4th	70
2022	Honda	LUS; Ret	LUS; 7	MAN; Ret	MAN; 6	MOT; Ret	MOT; C	**BUR**; 4	**BUR**; 3	**SEP**; 1	**SEP**; Ret	MAN; 2	MAN; 7	5th	102

=== European Talent Cup ===
==== Races by year ====
(key) (Races in bold indicate pole position; races in italics indicate fastest lap)

Year	Bike	1	2	3	4	5	6	7	8	9	10	11	Pos	Pts
2022	Honda	EST; 8	EST; 16	VAL; 13	VAL; 14	BAR; 16	JER; 17	JER; Ret	ALG; 12	ARA; 7	ARA; 6	VAL; 8	13th	44
2023	Honda	EST; Ret	EST; 14	VAL	VAL	JER	JER	ALG; 19	BAR; Ret	ARA	ARA	VAL	30th	2

=== Red Bull MotoGP Rookies Cup ===
==== Races by year ====
(key) (Races in bold indicate pole position; races in italics indicate fastest lap)

Year	Bike	1		2		3		4		5		6		7		Pos	Pts
Year	Bike	R1	R2	R1	R2	R1	R2	R1	R2	R1	R2	R1	R2	R1	R2	Pos	Pts
2023	KTM	ALG; 20	ALG; 15	JER; 17	JER; 15	LMS; 10	LMS; Ret	MUG; DNS	MUG; DNS	ASS; 10	ASS; 14	RBR; 19	RBR; 14	MIS; 12	MIS; 15	19th	23
2024	KTM	JER; Ret	JER; 14	LMS; 13	LMS; 11	MUG; 9	MUG; Ret	ASS; 9	ASS; 9	RBR; 10	RBR; Ret	ARA; 6	ARA; 6	MIS; 7	MIS; 8	10th	74
2025	KTM	JER; 4	JER; 1	LMS; 6	LMS; Ret	ARA; 9	ARA; Ret	MUG; 19	MUG; DSQ	SAC; 6	SAC; 6	RBR; 17	RBR; 8	MIS; 6	MIS; 10	9th	99

=== Supersport 300 World Championship ===
==== Races by year ====
(key) (Races in bold indicate pole position; races in italics indicate fastest lap)

Year	Bike	1		2		3		4		5		6		7		8		Pos	Pts
Year	Bike	R1	R2	R1	R2	R1	R2	R1	R2	R1	R2	R1	R2	R1	R2	R1	R2	Pos	Pts
2024	Kawasaki	BAR	BAR	ASS	ASS	MIS	MIS	MOS; 3	**MOS**; Ret	POR; 2	POR; 13	MAG	MAG	ARA; 6	ARA; 10	**JER**; 9	JER; Ret	14th	62
2025	Kawasaki	POR; 6	POR; 4	ASS; 6	ASS; 6	MOS; 11	MOS; 7	MIS; 1	**MIS**; 5	MAG; 3	MAG; 3	ARA; 1	ARA; Ret	EST; 2	EST; 1	JER; 8	**JER**; 6	2nd	213

=== Sportbike World Championship ===
==== Races by year ====
(key) (Races in bold indicate pole position; races in italics indicate fastest lap)

Year	Bike	1		2		3		4		5		6		7		8		Pos	Pts
Year	Bike	R1	R2	R1	R2	R1	R2	R1	R2	R1	R2	R1	R2	R1	R2	R1	R2	Pos	Pts
2026	Yamaha	POR; 12	POR; 14	ASS; 13	ASS; 9	MOS; Ret	MOS; 5	ARA; 6	**ARA**; 2	MIS; 3	MIS; 2	MAG; 7	MAG; 2	**CRE**; 5	CRE; 1	JER; 6	JER; 1	3rd	193
