= 2024 Supersport 300 World Championship =

Motorsport championship

2024 Supersport 300 World Championship
| Previous: | 2023 | Next: | 2025 |
Support series: Superbike World Championship; Supersport World Championship; Women's Circuit Racing World Championship; Yamaha R3 bLU cRU FIM World Cup

The 2024 Supersport 300 World Championship was the eighth season of the Supersport 300 World Championship. The championship was won by Aldi Satya Mahendra, who made history in becoming the first Indonesian rider to win the title.

== Race calendar and results ==
The provisional 2024 season calendar was announced on 26 October 2023.

2024 calendar
| Round | | | Circuit | Date | Superpole | Fastest lap | Winning rider | Winning team | Winning constructor | Ref |
|---|---|---|---|---|---|---|---|---|---|---|
| 1 | R1 | (Catalonia) Catalunya Round | Circuit de Barcelona-Catalunya | 23 March | (Spain) Julio Garcia González | (Spain) Marc García | (Netherlands) Jeffrey Buis | (Germany) Freudenberg KTM-PALIGO Racing | (Austria) KTM | |
| 1 | R2 | (Catalonia) Catalunya Round | Circuit de Barcelona-Catalunya | 24 March | | (Spain) Julio Garcia González | (Spain) Inigo Iglesias Bravo | (Germany) Fusport-RT Motorsports by SKM-Kawasaki | (Japan) Kawasaki | |
| 2 | R1 | (Netherlands) Dutch Round | TT Circuit Assen | 20 April | (United Kingdom) Fenton Seabright | (Indonesia) Aldi Satya Mahendra | (Spain) Daniel Mogeda | (Republic of Ireland) Team#109 Retro Traffic Kawasaki | (Japan) Kawasaki | |
| 2 | R2 | (Netherlands) Dutch Round | TT Circuit Assen | 21 April | | (Spain) Julio Garcia González | (Spain) Daniel Mogeda | (Republic of Ireland) Team#109 Retro Traffic Kawasaki | (Japan) Kawasaki | |
| 3 | R1 | Emilia-Romagna Round | Misano World Circuit Marco Simoncelli | 15 June | (Spain) Daniel Mogeda | (Italy) Mirko Gennai | (Spain) Inigo Iglesias Bravo | (Germany) Fusport-RT Motorsports by SKM-Kawasaki | (Japan) Kawasaki | |
| 3 | R2 | Emilia-Romagna Round | Misano World Circuit Marco Simoncelli | 16 June | | (Italy) Mirko Gennai | (Indonesia) Aldi Satya Mahendra | (Italy) Team BrCorse | (Japan) Yamaha | |
| 4 | R1 | (Czech Republic) Czech Round | Autodrom Most | 20 July | (Netherlands) Loris Veneman | (Australia) Carter Thompson | (Netherlands) Loris Veneman | (Belgium) MTM Kawasaki | (Japan) Kawasaki | |
| 4 | R2 | (Czech Republic) Czech Round | Autodrom Most | 21 July | | (Spain) David Salvador | (Netherlands) Loris Veneman | (Belgium) MTM Kawasaki | (Japan) Kawasaki | |
| 5 | R1 | (Portugal) Portuguese Round | Algarve International Circuit | 10 August | (Netherlands) Loris Veneman | (Italy) Matteo Vannucci | (Italy) Mirko Gennai | (Belgium) MTM Kawasaki | (Japan) Kawasaki | |
| 5 | R2 | (Portugal) Portuguese Round | Algarve International Circuit | 11 August | | (Netherlands) Loris Veneman | (Italy) Mirko Gennai | (Belgium) MTM Kawasaki | (Japan) Kawasaki | |
| 6 | R1 | (France) French Round | Circuit de Nevers Magny-Cours | 7 September | (Indonesia) Aldi Satya Mahendra | (Spain) Unai Calatayud | (Spain) Unai Calatayud | (Spain) ARCO SASH MotoR University Team | (Japan) Yamaha | |
| 6 | R2 | (France) French Round | Circuit de Nevers Magny-Cours | 8 September | | (Indonesia) Aldi Satya Mahendra | (Netherlands) Jeffrey Buis | (Germany) Freudenberg KTM-PALIGO Racing | (Austria) KTM | |
| 7 | R1 | (Aragon) Aragón Round | MotorLand Aragón | 28 September | (Netherlands) Loris Veneman | (Brazil) Gustavo Manso | (Spain) Inigo Iglesias Bravo | (Germany) Fusport-RT Motorsport by SKM-Kawasaki | (Japan) Kawasaki | |
| 7 | R2 | (Aragon) Aragón Round | MotorLand Aragón | 29 September | | (Germany) Phillip Tonn | (Italy) Mirko Gennai | (Belgium) MTM Kawasaki | (Japan) Kawasaki | |
| 8 | R1 | (Spain) Spanish Round | Circuito de Jerez | 19 October | (Australia) Carter Thompson | (Italy) Mirko Gennai | (Spain) David Salvador | (Spain) MS Racing | (Japan) Yamaha | |
| 8 | R2 | (Spain) Spanish Round | Circuito de Jerez | 20 October | | (Spain) Gonzalo Sánchez | (Spain) Julio Garcia González | (China) KOVE Racing Team | (China) Kove | |

== Entry list ==
2024 entry list
| Team | Constructor | Motorcycle | No | Rider | Rounds |
|---|---|---|---|---|---|
| (Czech Republic) Accolade Smrž Racing BGR | Kawasaki | Ninja 400 | 11 | (Czech Republic) Filip Novotny | All |
| (Czech Republic) Accolade Smrž Racing BGR | Kawasaki | Ninja 400 | 27 | (United States) Christopher Clark | 1–6 |
| (Czech Republic) Accolade Smrž Racing BGR | Kawasaki | Ninja 400 | 44 | (United Kingdom) Sullivan Mounsey | 7-8 |
| (Spain) Deza-Box 77 Racing Team | Kawasaki | Ninja 400 | 16 | (Spain) Uriel Hidalgo | 7 |
| (Spain) Deza-Box 77 Racing Team | Kawasaki | Ninja 400 | 71 | (Spain) Iván Bolaño Hernández | All |
| (Spain) Deza-Box 77 Racing Team | Kawasaki | Ninja 400 | 77 | (Spain) José Manuel Osuna Saez | All |
| (Germany) Fusport-RT Motorsports by SKM-Kawasaki | Kawasaki | Ninja 400 | 23 | (France) Samuel Di Sora | 6 |
| (Germany) Fusport-RT Motorsports by SKM-Kawasaki | Kawasaki | Ninja 400 | 53 | (Czech Republic) Petr Svoboda | 1–3 |
| (Germany) Fusport-RT Motorsports by SKM-Kawasaki | Kawasaki | Ninja 400 | 58 | (Spain) Iñigo Iglesias Bravo | All |
| (Germany) Fusport-RT Motorsports by SKM-Kawasaki | Kawasaki | Ninja 400 | 50 | (Australia) Carter Thompson | 4–5, 7–8 |
| (Italy) Kawasaki GP Project | Kawasaki | Ninja 400 | 25 | (Italy) Mattia Martella | 1–6 |
| (Italy) Kawasaki GP Project | Kawasaki | Ninja 400 | 39 | (Spain) Juan Risueño | 8 |
| (Italy) Kawasaki GP Project | Kawasaki | Ninja 400 | 47 | (United Kingdom) Fenton Seabright | All |
| (Italy) Kawasaki GP Project | Kawasaki | Ninja 400 | 86 | (Czech Republic) Daniel Turecek | 7 |
| (Italy) MGIM Corse | Kawasaki | Ninja 400 | 19 | (Italy) Nicola Plazzi | 3 |
| (Netherlands) Molenaar Racing | Kawasaki | Ninja 400 | 33 | (Netherlands) Senna van den Hoven | 2 |
| (Italy) MRT Corse | Kawasaki | Ninja 400 | 5 | (Italy) Matteo Bonetti | 3 |
| (Belgium) MTM Kawasaki | Kawasaki | Ninja 400 | 7 | (Netherlands) Loris Veneman | All |
| (Belgium) MTM Kawasaki | Kawasaki | Ninja 400 | 26 | (Italy) Mirko Gennai | All |
| (Spain) Pons Motorsport Italika Racing | Kawasaki | Ninja 400 | 79 | (Portugal) Tomás Alonso | 5, 8 |
| (Italy) ProDina Racing WorldSSP300 | Kawasaki | Ninja 400 | 8 | (Italy) Bruno Ieraci | 1–7 |
| (Italy) ProDina Racing WorldSSP300 | Kawasaki | Ninja 400 | 29 | (Italy) Giacomo Zannini | All |
| (Italy) ProDina Racing WorldSSP300 | Kawasaki | Ninja 400 | 74 | (Spain) Antonio Torres Domínguez | 8 |
| (Czech Republic) Rohac & Fejta Motoracing Team | Kawasaki | Ninja 400 | 86 | (Czech Republic) Daniel Turecek | 4 |
| (Portugal) Speed Master Racing Team | Kawasaki | Ninja 400 | 61 | (Portugal) Dinis Borges | 5 |
| (Republic of Ireland) Team#109 Retro Traffic Kawasaki | Kawasaki | Ninja 400 | 88 | (Spain) Daniel Mogeda | 1–3, 5–8 |
| (Republic of Ireland) Team#109 Retro Traffic Kawasaki | Kawasaki | Ninja 400 | 14 | (India) Kavin Samaar Quintal | 4 |
| (France) Team Flembbo - PL Performance | Kawasaki | Ninja 400 | 17 | (Netherlands) Ruben Bijman | All |
| (France) Team Flembbo - PL Performance | Kawasaki | Ninja 400 | 18 | (Thailand) Varis Fleming | 3 |
| (France) Team Flembbo - PL Performance | Kawasaki | Ninja 400 | 85 | (Italy) Kevin Sabatucci | 1–2, 4–8 |
| (China) KOVE Racing Team | Kove | 321RR | 22 | (Spain) Marc García | All |
| (China) KOVE Racing Team | Kove | 321RR | 48 | (Spain) Julio García González | All |
| (Germany) Freudenberg KTM-Paligo Racing | KTM | RC 390 R | 1 | (Netherlands) Jeffrey Buis | All |
| (Germany) Freudenberg KTM-Paligo Racing | KTM | RC 390 R | 66 | (Germany) Phillip Tonn | All |
| (Germany) Freudenberg KTM-Paligo Racing | KTM | RC 390 R | 69 | (Denmark) Oliver Svendsen | 4 |
| (Spain) ARCO SASH MotoR University Team | Yamaha | YZF-R3 | 13 | (Spain) Roberto Fernández | 7-8 |
| (Spain) ARCO SASH MotoR University Team | Yamaha | YZF-R3 | 23 | (France) Samuel Di Sora | 1–5 |
| (Spain) ARCO SASH MotoR University Team | Yamaha | YZF-R3 | 24 | (Italy) Michel Agazzi | 6 |
| (Spain) ARCO SASH MotoR University Team | Yamaha | YZF-R3 | 32 | (Spain) Gonzalo Sánchez | 8 |
| (Spain) ARCO SASH MotoR University Team | Yamaha | YZF-R3 | 55 | (Spain) Unai Calatayud | All |
| (Spain) MS Racing | Yamaha | YZF-R3 | 24 | (Italy) Michel Agazzi | 1–3 |
| (Spain) MS Racing | Yamaha | YZF-R3 | 38 | (Spain) David Salvador | 1–6, 8 |
| (Spain) MS Racing | Yamaha | YZF-R3 | 74 | (Spain) Antonio Torres Domínguez | 7 |
| (Spain) MS Racing | Yamaha | YZF-R3 | 99 | (Brazil) Humberto Maier | 4-8 |
| (Italy) Pata Yamaha AG Motorsport Italia | Yamaha | YZF-R3 | 41 | (Italy) Raffaele Tragni | All |
| (Italy) Pata Yamaha AG Motorsport Italia | Yamaha | YZF-R3 | 91 | (Italy) Matteo Vannucci | All |
| (Italy) ProGP NitiRacing | Yamaha | YZF-R3 | 56 | (Indonesia) Galang Hendra Pratama | All |
| (Italy) Racestar | Yamaha | YZF-R3 | 4 | (Italy) Emanuele Cazzaniga | 1 |
| (Netherlands) Racing DC | Yamaha | YZF-R3 | 12 | (Netherlands) Dylan Czarkowski | 2 |
| (Italy) Team BrCorse | Yamaha | YZF-R3 | 43 | (Italy) Marco Gaggi | All |
| (Italy) Team BrCorse | Yamaha | YZF-R3 | 57 | (Indonesia) Aldi Satya Mahendra | All |
| (Brazil) Yamaha AD78 FIM LA By MS Racing | Yamaha | YZF-R3 | 62 | (Brazil) Kevin Fontainha | All |
| (Brazil) Yamaha AD78 FIM LA By MS Racing | Yamaha | YZF-R3 | 80 | (Brazil) Gustavo Manso | All |
| (Italy) Yamaha Motoxracing WorldSSP300 Team | Yamaha | YZF-R3 | 9 | (Italy) Emiliano Ercolani | All |
| (Italy) Yamaha Motoxracing WorldSSP300 Team | Yamaha | YZF-R3 | 31 | (Italy) Elia Bartolini | All |

Key
Regular rider
Wildcard rider
Replacement rider

== Championship standings ==
Points

| Position | **1st** | **2nd** | **3rd** | **4th** | **5th** | **6th** | **7th** | **8th** | **9th** | **10th** | **11th** | **12th** | **13th** | **14th** | **15th** |
| Points | 25 | 20 | 16 | 13 | 11 | 10 | 9 | 8 | 7 | 6 | 5 | 4 | 3 | 2 | 1 |

=== Riders' championship ===
| Pos. | Rider | Bike | BAR (Catalonia) | | ASS (Netherlands) | | MIS (Emilia-Romagna) | | MOS (Czech Republic) | | ALG (Portugal) | | MAG (France) | | ARA (Aragon) | | JER (Spain) | | Pts. |
|---|---|---|---|---|---|---|---|---|---|---|---|---|---|---|---|---|---|---|---|
| 1 | (Indonesia) Aldi Satya Mahendra | Yamaha | 2 | 8 | 8 | **11** | 2 | 1 | 8 | 3 | 6 | 8 | **2** | 3 | 5 | 2 | 3 | 6 | 221 |
| 2 | (Netherlands) Loris Veneman | Kawasaki | 5 | 15 | 5 | 2 | 7 | 12 | **1** | 1 | **4** | 2 | 16 | 4 | **3** | 5 | 6 | 5 | 200 |
| 3 | (Spain) Iñigo Iglesias Bravo | Kawasaki | 13 | 1 | 3 | 4 | 1 | 3 | 5 | 2 | Ret | Ret | 7 | Ret | 1 | 18 | WD | WD | 163 |
| 4 | (Spain) Julio García González | Kove | Ret | 2 | Ret | 10 | Ret | 19 | 20 | 7 | 9 | 3 | 8 | 8 | 2 | 4 | 2 | 1 | 152 |
| 5 | (Netherlands) Jeffrey Buis | KTM | 1 | 17 | Ret | DNS | 6 | 2 | 21 | Ret | 7 | 7 | 4 | 1 | 9 | 8 | 18 | 10 | 132 |
| 6 | (Spain) Marc García | Kove | 7 | **18** | 9 | Ret | 4 | 9 | 2 | 12 | 3 | 4 | 14 | 5 | 20 | 11 | 7 | 3 | 132 |
| 7 | (Italy) Mirko Gennai | Kawasaki | 6 | 12 | Ret | Ret | 3 | **10** | 4 | Ret | 1 | 1 | Ret | 14 | 11 | 1 | 17 | **Ret** | 131 |
| 8 | (Indonesia) Galang Hendra Pratama | Yamaha | Ret | 7 | 6 | 5 | Ret | 4 | 13 | 8 | 8 | 17 | 3 | 2 | 4 | DNS | 8 | 8 | 127 |
| 9 | (Italy) Marco Gaggi | Yamaha | 9 | 10 | 10 | 7 | 11 | 5 | 12 | 6 | 10 | 9 | Ret | 12 | 10 | DNS | 5 | 12 | 96 |
| 10 | (Spain) José Manuel Osuna Saez | Kawasaki | 22 | 13 | Ret | 12 | 5 | 7 | 7 | 9 | 11 | 11 | 24 | 7 | 8 | 3 | 27 | 7 | 95 |
| 11 | (Spain) Daniel Mogeda | Kawasaki | **Ret** | 4 | 1 | 1 | **Ret** | DNS | | | 13 | 6 | 11 | Ret | 12 | Ret | 16 | 18 | 85 |
| 12 | (Spain) David Salvador | Yamaha | 12 | 16 | Ret | 22 | 9 | 6 | 10 | 5 | 14 | Ret | 25 | Ret | | | 1 | 4 | 78 |
| 13 | (Italy) Elia Bartolini | Yamaha | 11 | 21 | 16 | 6 | Ret | 8 | 16 | 10 | 5 | 5 | Ret | 9 | 17 | 15 | 15 | 13 | 63 |
| 14 | (Australia) Carter Thompson | Kawasaki | | | | | | | 3 | **Ret** | 2 | 13 | | | 6 | 10 | **9** | Ret | 62 |
| 15 | (Spain) Unai Calatayud | Yamaha | Ret | 6 | 2 | Ret | 14 | 20 | 19 | Ret | 24 | 20 | 1 | **15** | 24 | DNS | 29 | 23 | 58 |
| 16 | (Italy) Bruno Ieraci | Kawasaki | Ret | 3 | Ret | 8 | 12 | 13 | 11 | 4 | 20 | 12 | 23 | 17 | DNS | 13 | | | 56 |
| 17 | (Czech Republic) Petr Svoboda | Kawasaki | 4 | 5 | 4 | 3 | Ret | DNS | | | | | | | | | | | 53 |
| 18 | (Spain) Antonio Torres Domínguez | Yamaha | | | | | | | | | | | | | 13 | 9 | | | 43 |
| 18 | (Spain) Antonio Torres Domínguez | Kawasaki | | | | | | | | | | | | | | | 4 | 2 | 43 |
| 19 | (Italy) Matteo Vannucci | Yamaha | 14 | 19 | Ret | DNS | 8 | Ret | Ret | Ret | 30 | **14** | 9 | 10 | 14 | 7 | 10 | Ret | 42 |
| 20 | (France) Samuel Di Sora | Yamaha | 3 | 9 | Ret | 9 | 16 | Ret | Ret | 15 | Ret | 21 | | | | | | | 34 |
| 20 | (France) Samuel Di Sora | Kawasaki | | | | | | | | | | | 13 | 20 | | | | | 34 |
| 21 | (Germany) Phillip Tonn | KTM | Ret | 29 | 12 | 13 | 19 | 16 | 30 | 16 | 12 | 22 | 10 | 6 | 18 | 12 | Ret | 14 | 33 |
| 22 | (Brazil) Humberto Maier | Yamaha | | | | | | | 9 | 14 | 16 | 16 | 5 | 11 | Ret | 16 | 11 | 15 | 31 |
| 23 | (Brazil) Gustavo Manso | Yamaha | 20 | 31 | 15 | 15 | 10 | Ret | 18 | Ret | 23 | 27 | 22 | 19 | 7 | **6** | 12 | Ret | 31 |
| 24 | (Netherlands) Ruben Bijman | Kawasaki | 8 | 11 | 7 | Ret | 18 | 17 | Ret | 11 | 19 | 23 | Ret | 18 | 21 | 22 | 20 | 19 | 27 |
| 25 | (Italy) Emiliano Ercolani | Yamaha | 26 | Ret | Ret | 23 | Ret | 11 | 14 | 13 | Ret | 18 | 12 | 16 | 15 | Ret | 14 | 11 | 22 |
| 26 | (United Kingdom) Fenton Seabright | Kawasaki | 25 | 14 | **13** | Ret | 13 | 14 | 17 | Ret | 18 | 10 | Ret | 27 | 16 | Ret | 13 | Ret | 19 |
| 27 | (Italy) Kevin Sabatucci | Kawasaki | Ret | Ret | Ret | DNS | | | 25 | 20 | 20 | 24 | 6 | 13 | 23 | 21 | 22 | 21 | 13 |
| 28 | (Denmark) Oliver Svendsen | KTM | | | | | | | 6 | Ret | | | | | | | | | 10 |
| 29 | (Spain) Gonzalo Sánchez | Yamaha | | | | | | | | | | | | | | | 26 | 9 | 7 |
| 30 | (Italy) Emanuele Cazzaniga | Yamaha | 10 | 23 | | | | | | | | | | | | | | | 6 |
| 31 | (Brazil) Kevin Fontainha | Yamaha | 15 | 20 | Ret | 14 | 17 | 18 | 15 | Ret | 17 | 15 | 15 | 21 | 19 | 17 | 23 | 25 | 6 |
| 32 | (Netherlands) Dylan Czarkowski | Yamaha | | | 11 | 21 | | | | | | | | | | | | | 5 |
| 33 | (Italy) Raffaele Tragni | Yamaha | 17 | 25 | 14 | 18 | 15 | Ret | 24 | Ret | 22 | 25 | Ret | 22 | Ret | 24 | 30 | 27 | 3 |
| 34 | (United Kingdom) Sullivan Mounsey | Kawasaki | | | | | | | | | | | | | 25 | 14 | 32 | 20 | 2 |
| 35 | (Portugal) Tomás Alonso | Kawasaki | | | | | | | | | 15 | 19 | | | | | 19 | 16 | 1 |
| 36 | (Spain) Iván Bolaño Hernández | Kawasaki | 18 | 22 | 22 | Ret | 22 | 15 | DNS | DNS | 26 | 26 | 21 | 23 | 26 | 25 | 25 | 22 | 1 |
| | (Italy) Michel Agazzi | Yamaha | 16 | 27 | 17 | Ret | Ret | 26 | | | | | 17 | 25 | | | | | 0 |
| | (Italy) Giacomo Zannini | Kawasaki | 21 | 28 | 21 | 16 | Ret | 21 | 26 | 19 | 25 | 28 | 19 | 26 | 27 | 20 | 28 | 26 | 0 |
| | (Czech Republic) Filip Novotny | Kawasaki | 23 | 24 | 18 | 17 | 21 | 25 | 22 | 17 | 27 | 29 | 18 | Ret | 22 | 19 | 21 | 24 | 0 |
| | (Spain) Juan Risueño | Kawasaki | | | | | | | | | | | | | | | 24 | 17 | 0 |
| | (United States) Christopher Clark | Kawasaki | 24 | 30 | Ret | 20 | 25 | 27 | 23 | 18 | 29 | 31 | DNS | DNS | | | | | 0 |
| | (Italy) Mattia Martella | Kawasaki | 19 | 26 | 19 | Ret | 24 | 24 | 27 | 22 | 28 | 30 | 20 | 24 | | | | | 0 |
| | (Netherlands) Senna van den Hoven | Kawasaki | | | 20 | 19 | | | | | | | | | | | | | 0 |
| | (Italy) Matteo Bonetti | Kawasaki | | | | | 20 | 22 | | | | | | | | | | | 0 |
| | (India) Kavin Samaar Quintal | Kawasaki | | | | | | | 29 | 21 | | | | | | | | | 0 |
| | (Italy) Nicola Plazzi | Kawasaki | | | | | 23 | 23 | | | | | | | | | | | 0 |
| | (Czech Republic) Daniel Turecek | Kawasaki | | | | | | | 28 | Ret | | | | | DNQ | DNQ | | | 0 |
| | (Spain) Roberto Fernández | Yamaha | | | | | | | | | | | | | 28 | DNS | 31 | 28 | 0 |
| | (Spain) Uriel Hidalgo | Kawasaki | | | | | | | | | | | | | 29 | 23 | | | 0 |
| | (Thailand) Varis Fleming | Kawasaki | | | | | Ret | Ret | | | | | | | | | | | 0 |
| | (Portugal) Dinis Borges | Kawasaki | | | | | | | | | WD | WD | | | | | | | 0 |
| Pos. | Rider | Bike | BAR (Catalonia) | | ASS (Netherlands) | | MIS (Emilia-Romagna) | | MOS (Czech Republic) | | ALG (Portugal) | | MAG (France) | | ARA (Aragon) | | JER (Spain) | | Pts. |

| Colour | Result |
|---|---|
| Gold | Winner |
| Silver | Second place |
| Bronze | Third place |
| Green | Points classification |
| Blue | Non-points classification |
| Blue | Non-classified finish (NC) |
| Purple | Retired, not classified (Ret) |
| Red | Did not qualify (DNQ) |
| Red | Did not pre-qualify (DNPQ) |
| Black | Disqualified (DSQ) |
| White | Did not start (DNS) |
| White | Withdrew (WD) |
| White | Race cancelled (C) |
| Blank | Did not practice (DNP) |
| Blank | Did not arrive (DNA) |
| Blank | Excluded (EX) |

**Bold** – Pole position
Italics – Fastest lap

=== Teams' championship ===
| Pos. | Teams | Bike No. | BAR (Catalonia) | | ASS (Netherlands) | | MIS (Emilia-Romagna) | | MOS (Czech Republic) | | ALG (Portugal) | | MAG (France) | | ARA (Aragon) | | JER (Spain) | | Pts. |
| Pos. | Teams | Bike No. | R1 | R2 | R1 | R2 | R1 | R2 | R1 | R2 | R1 | R2 | R1 | R2 | R1 | R2 | R1 | R2 | Pts. |
|---|---|---|---|---|---|---|---|---|---|---|---|---|---|---|---|---|---|---|---|
| 1 | (Belgium) MTM Kawasaki | 7 | 5 | 15 | 5 | 2 | 7 | 12 | **1** | 1 | **4** | 2 | 16 | 4 | **3** | 5 | 6 | 5 | 331 |
| 1 | (Belgium) MTM Kawasaki | 26 | 6 | 12 | Ret | Ret | 3 | **10** | 4 | Ret | 1 | 1 | Ret | 14 | 11 | 1 | 17 | **Ret** | 331 |
| 2 | (Italy) Team BrCorse | 57 | 2 | 8 | 8 | **11** | 2 | 1 | 8 | 3 | 6 | 8 | **2** | 3 | 5 | 2 | 3 | 6 | 317 |
| 2 | (Italy) Team BrCorse | 43 | 9 | 10 | 10 | 7 | 11 | 5 | 12 | 6 | 10 | 9 | Ret | 12 | 10 | DNS | 5 | 12 | 317 |
| 3 | (China) Kove Racing Team | 48 | Ret | 2 | Ret | 10 | Ret | 19 | 20 | 7 | 9 | 3 | 8 | 8 | 2 | 4 | 2 | 1 | 284 |
| 3 | (China) Kove Racing Team | 22 | 7 | **18** | 9 | Ret | 4 | 9 | 2 | 12 | 3 | 4 | 14 | 5 | 20 | 11 | 7 | 3 | 284 |
| 4 | (Germany) Fusport-RT Motorsport by SKM-Kawasaki | 58 | 13 | 1 | 3 | 4 | 1 | 3 | 5 | 2 | Ret | Ret | 7 | Ret | 1 | 18 | WD | WD | 281 |
| 4 | (Germany) Fusport-RT Motorsport by SKM-Kawasaki | 50 | | | | | | | 3 | **Ret** | 2 | 13 | | | 6 | 10 | **9** | Ret | 281 |
| 4 | (Germany) Fusport-RT Motorsport by SKM-Kawasaki | 53 | 4 | 5 | 4 | 3 | Ret | DNS | | | | | | | | | | | 281 |
| 4 | (Germany) Fusport-RT Motorsport by SKM-Kawasaki | 23 | | | | | | | | | | | 13 | 20 | | | | | 281 |
| 5 | (Germany) Freudenberg KTM-Paligo Racing | 1 | 1 | 17 | Ret | DNS | 6 | 2 | 21 | Ret | 7 | 7 | 4 | 1 | 9 | 8 | 18 | 10 | 175 |
| 5 | (Germany) Freudenberg KTM-Paligo Racing | 66 | Ret | 29 | 12 | 13 | 19 | 16 | 30 | 16 | 12 | 22 | 10 | 6 | 18 | 12 | Ret | 14 | 175 |
| 5 | (Germany) Freudenberg KTM-Paligo Racing | 69 | | | | | | | 6 | Ret | | | | | | | | | 175 |
| 6 | (Italy) ProGP NitiRacing | 56 | Ret | 7 | 6 | 5 | Ret | 4 | 13 | 8 | 8 | 17 | 3 | 2 | 4 | DNS | 8 | 8 | 127 |
| 7 | (Spain) MS Racing | 38 | 12 | 16 | Ret | 22 | 9 | 6 | 10 | 5 | 14 | Ret | 25 | Ret | | | 1 | 4 | 119 |
| 7 | (Spain) MS Racing | 99 | | | | | | | 9 | 14 | 16 | 16 | 5 | 11 | Ret | 16 | 11 | 15 | 119 |
| 7 | (Spain) MS Racing | 74 | | | | | | | | | | | | | 13 | 9 | | | 119 |
| 7 | (Spain) MS Racing | 24 | 16 | 27 | 17 | Ret | Ret | 26 | | | | | | | | | | | 119 |
| 8 | (Spain) Deza-Box 77 Racing Team | 77 | 22 | 13 | Ret | 12 | 5 | 7 | 7 | 9 | 11 | 11 | 24 | 7 | 8 | 3 | 27 | 7 | 96 |
| 8 | (Spain) Deza-Box 77 Racing Team | 71 | 18 | 22 | 22 | Ret | 22 | 15 | DNS | DNS | 26 | 26 | 21 | 23 | 26 | 25 | 25 | 22 | 96 |
| 8 | (Spain) Deza-Box 77 Racing Team | 16 | | | | | | | | | | | | | 29 | 23 | | | 96 |
| 9 | (Spain) ARCO SASH MotoR University Team | 55 | Ret | 6 | 2 | Ret | 14 | 20 | 19 | Ret | 24 | 20 | 1 | **15** | 24 | DNS | 29 | 23 | 96 |
| 9 | (Spain) ARCO SASH MotoR University Team | 23 | 3 | 9 | Ret | 9 | 16 | Ret | Ret | 15 | Ret | 21 | | | | | | | 96 |
| 9 | (Spain) ARCO SASH MotoR University Team | 32 | | | | | | | | | | | | | | | 26 | 9 | 96 |
| 9 | (Spain) ARCO SASH MotoR University Team | 24 | | | | | | | | | | | 17 | 25 | | | | | 96 |
| 9 | (Spain) ARCO SASH MotoR University Team | 13 | | | | | | | | | | | | | 28 | DNS | 31 | 28 | 96 |
| 10 | (Italy) ProDina Racing WorldSSP300 | 8 | Ret | 3 | Ret | 8 | 12 | 13 | 11 | 4 | 20 | 12 | 23 | 17 | DNS | 13 | | | 89 |
| 10 | (Italy) ProDina Racing WorldSSP300 | 74 | | | | | | | | | | | | | | | 4 | 2 | 89 |
| 10 | (Italy) ProDina Racing WorldSSP300 | 29 | 21 | 28 | 21 | 16 | Ret | 21 | 26 | 19 | 25 | 28 | 19 | 26 | 27 | 20 | 28 | 26 | 89 |
| 11 | (Republic of Ireland) Team#109 Retro Traffic Kawasaki | 88 | **Ret** | 4 | 1 | 1 | **Ret** | DNS | | | 13 | 6 | 11 | Ret | 12 | Ret | 16 | 18 | 85 |
| 11 | (Republic of Ireland) Team#109 Retro Traffic Kawasaki | 14 | | | | | | | 29 | 21 | | | | | | | | | 85 |
| 12 | (Italy) Yamaha Motoxracing WorldSSP300 Team | 31 | 11 | 21 | 16 | 6 | Ret | 8 | 16 | 10 | 5 | 5 | Ret | 9 | 17 | 15 | 15 | 13 | 85 |
| 12 | (Italy) Yamaha Motoxracing WorldSSP300 Team | 9 | 26 | Ret | Ret | 23 | Ret | 11 | 14 | 13 | Ret | 18 | 12 | 16 | 15 | Ret | 14 | 11 | 85 |
| 13 | (Italy) Pata Yamaha AG Motorsport Italia | 91 | 14 | 19 | Ret | DNS | 8 | Ret | Ret | Ret | 30 | **14** | 9 | 10 | 14 | 7 | 10 | Ret | 45 |
| 13 | (Italy) Pata Yamaha AG Motorsport Italia | 41 | 17 | 25 | 14 | 18 | 15 | Ret | 24 | Ret | 22 | 25 | Ret | 22 | Ret | 24 | 30 | 27 | 45 |
| 14 | (France) Team Flembbo-PL Performance | 17 | 8 | 11 | 7 | Ret | 18 | 17 | Ret | 11 | 19 | 23 | Ret | 18 | 21 | 22 | 20 | 19 | 40 |
| 14 | (France) Team Flembbo-PL Performance | 85 | Ret | Ret | Ret | DNS | | | 25 | 20 | 20 | 24 | 6 | 13 | 23 | 21 | 22 | 21 | 40 |
| 14 | (France) Team Flembbo-PL Performance | 18 | | | | | Ret | Ret | | | | | | | | | | | 40 |
| 15 | (Brazil) Yamaha AD78 FIM LA by MS Racing | 80 | 20 | 31 | 15 | 15 | 10 | Ret | 18 | Ret | 23 | 27 | 22 | 19 | 7 | **6** | 12 | Ret | 37 |
| 15 | (Brazil) Yamaha AD78 FIM LA by MS Racing | 62 | 15 | 20 | Ret | 14 | 17 | 18 | 15 | Ret | 17 | 15 | 15 | 21 | 19 | 17 | 23 | 25 | 37 |
| 16 | (Italy) Kawasaki GP Project | 47 | 25 | 14 | **13** | Ret | 13 | 14 | 17 | Ret | 18 | 10 | Ret | 27 | 16 | Ret | 13 | Ret | 19 |
| 16 | (Italy) Kawasaki GP Project | 39 | | | | | | | | | | | | | | | 24 | 17 | 19 |
| 16 | (Italy) Kawasaki GP Project | 25 | 19 | 26 | 19 | Ret | 24 | 24 | 27 | 22 | 28 | 30 | 20 | 24 | | | | | 19 |
| 16 | (Italy) Kawasaki GP Project | 86 | | | | | | | | | | | | | DNQ | DNQ | | | 19 |
| 17 | (Italy) Racestar | 4 | 10 | 23 | | | | | | | | | | | | | | | 6 |
| 18 | (Netherlands) Racing DC | 12 | | | 11 | 21 | | | | | | | | | | | | | 5 |
| 19 | (Czech Republic) Accolade Smrž Racing BGR | 44 | | | | | | | | | | | | | Ret | 14 | 32 | 20 | 2 |
| 19 | (Czech Republic) Accolade Smrž Racing BGR | 11 | 23 | 24 | 18 | 17 | 21 | 25 | 22 | 17 | 27 | 29 | 18 | Ret | 22 | 19 | 21 | 24 | 2 |
| 19 | (Czech Republic) Accolade Smrž Racing BGR | 27 | 24 | 30 | Ret | 20 | 25 | 27 | 23 | 18 | 29 | 31 | DNS | DNS | | | | | 2 |
| 20 | (Spain) Pons Motorsport Italika Racing | 79 | | | | | | | | | 15 | 19 | | | | | 19 | 16 | 1 |
| 21 | (Netherlands) Molenaar Racing | 33 | | | 20 | 19 | | | | | | | | | | | | | 0 |
| 22 | (Italy) MRT Corse | 5 | | | | | 20 | 22 | | | | | | | | | | | 0 |
| 23 | (Italy) MGIM Corse | 19 | | | | | 23 | 23 | | | | | | | | | | | 0 |
| 24 | (Czech Republic) Rohac & Fejta Motoracing Team | 86 | | | | | | | 28 | Ret | | | | | | | | | 0 |
| 25 | (Portugal) Speed Master Racing Team | 61 | | | | | | | | | WD | WD | | | | | | | 0 |

=== Manufacturers' championship ===
| Pos. | Manufacturer | BAR (Catalonia) | | ASS (Netherlands) | | MIS (Emilia-Romagna) | | MOS (Czech Republic) | | ALG (Portugal) | | MAG (France) | | ARA (Aragon) | | JER (Spain) | | Pts. |
|---|---|---|---|---|---|---|---|---|---|---|---|---|---|---|---|---|---|---|
| 1 | (Japan) Kawasaki | 4 | 1 | 1 | 1 | 1 | 3 | 1 | 1 | 1 | 1 | 6 | 4 | 1 | 1 | 6 | 2 | 332 |
| 2 | (Japan) Yamaha | 2 | 6 | 2 | 5 | 2 | 1 | 8 | 3 | 5 | 5 | 1 | 2 | 4 | 2 | 1 | 4 | 271 |
| 3 | (China) Kove | 7 | 2 | 9 | 10 | 4 | 9 | 2 | 7 | 3 | 3 | 8 | 5 | 2 | 4 | 2 | 1 | 220 |
| 4 | (Austria) KTM | 1 | 17 | 12 | 13 | 6 | 2 | 6 | 16 | 7 | 7 | 4 | 1 | 9 | 8 | 18 | 10 | 149 |
| Pos. | Manufacturer | BAR (Catalonia) | | ASS (Netherlands) | | MIS (Emilia-Romagna) | | MOS (Czech Republic) | | ALG (Portugal) | | MAG (France) | | ARA (Aragon) | | JER (Spain) | | Pts. |
