= Elia Bartolini =

Italian motorcycle racer (born 2003)

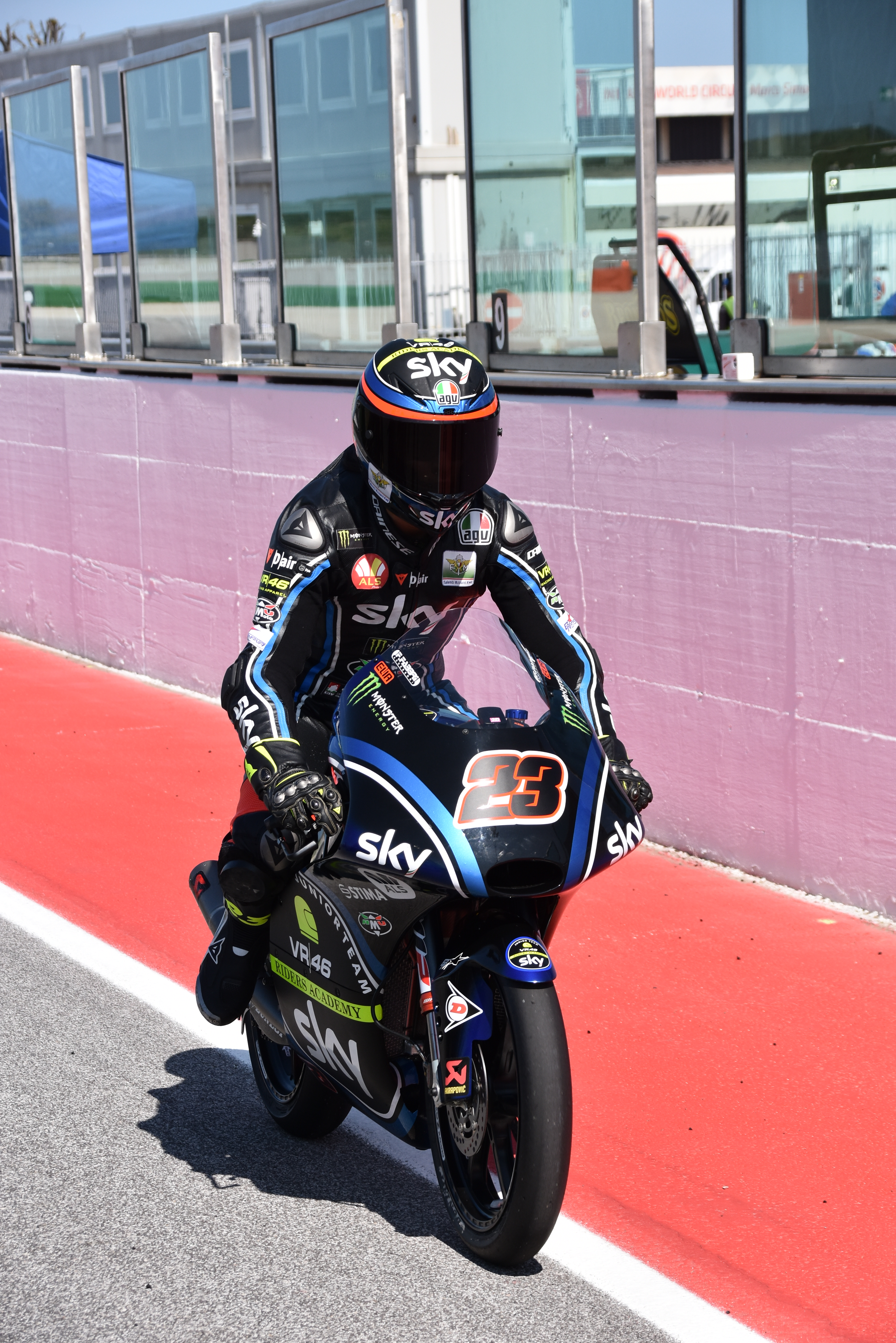
- Bartolini in 2019
- Nationality: Italian
- Born: 18 July 2003 (age 23); Cesena, Italy
- Current team: CM Triumph Factory Racing
- Bike number: 23
Motorcycle racing career statistics
Moto3 World Championship
Active years	2019, 2021–2022
Manufacturers	KTM
2022 championship position	22nd (17 pts)
Starts / Wins / Podiums / Poles / F. laps / Points; 27 / 0 / 0 / 0 / 0 / 35
Supersport 300 World Championship
Active years	2024–present
Manufacturers	Yamaha
Championships	0
2024 championship position	13th (63 pts)
Starts / Wins / Podiums / Poles / F. laps / Points; 19 / 0 / 0 / 0 / 0 / 73

Elia Bartolini (born 18 July 2003) is an Italian motorcycle rider. He currently competes in the newly founded 2026 Sportbike World Championship, riding a Triumph Daytona 660 for the factory team. He previously competed in the 2025 Supersport 300 World Championship on a Yamaha, and in Moto3 for QJmotor Avintia Esponsorama in 2022.

== Career ==
Bartolini started racing in national competitions in 2010, reaching eighth in the Italian SAV Championship.

In 2012, Bartolini won the Regional Championship and the Marco Simoncelli Trophy in the same category. In 2013, he won the Junior A European Championship, while in 2014, he won it in the Junior B category. In 2015, he won the Italian MiniGP 50 championship with Pasini Racing.

In 2016, Bartolini switched to the PreMoto3 125 category winning one race in Imola. After one year in PreMoto3 250, he participated in the CIV Moto3 championship in 2018 arriving seventh in the championship. In 2019, he finished eighth with one win and two podiums, while in 2020, he finished fourth, then in 2021, he won the championship.

In 2024, Bartolini participated in both the CIV Moto3 championship and the Supersport 300 championship finishing third in the CIV championship and 13th in the Supersport 300 championship.

== Career statistics ==
=== FIM CEV Moto3 Junior World Championship ===
==== Races by year ====
(key) (Races in bold indicate pole position, races in italics indicate fastest lap)

Year	Bike	1	2	3	4	5	6	7	8	9	10	11	12	Pos	Pts
2018	KTM	EST	VAL1	VAL2	FRA	CAT1	CAT2	ARA	JER1; 23	JER2; 24	ALB	VAL1	VAL2	NC	0

=== FIM JuniorGP World Championship ===
==== Races by year ====
(key) (Races in bold indicate pole position, races in italics indicate fastest lap)

Year	Bike	1	2	3	4	5	6	7	8	9	10	11	12	Pos	Pts
2023	Honda	EST; 7	VAL1; 8	VAL2; Ret	JER1; 8	JER2; 4	ALG1; Ret	ALG2; 10	CAT1; 11	CAT2; 9	ARA	VAL3	VAL4	15th	45

=== Grand Prix motorcycle racing ===
==== By season ====
Season	Class	Motorcycle	Team	Race	Win	Podium	Pole	FLap	Pts	Plcd
2019	Moto3	KTM	Sky Junior Team VR46	1	0	0	0	0	1	34
2021	Moto3	KTM	Team Bardahl VR46 Riders Academy	2	0	0	0	0	0	27th
2021	Moto3	KTM	Avintia VR46	4	0	0	0	0	7	27th
2022	Moto3	KTM	QJmotor Avintia Racing Team	20	0	0	0	0	27	22nd
Total				**27**	**0**	**0**	**0**	**0**	**35**	

==== By class ====
Class	Seasons	1st GP	Race	Win	Podiums	Pole	FLap	Pts	WChmp
Moto3	2019, 2021–2022	2019 San Marino	27	0	0	0	0	35	0
Total	2019, 2021–2022		**27**	**0**	**0**	**0**	**0**	**35**	**0**

==== Races by year ====
(key) (Races in bold indicate pole position, races in italics indicate fastest lap)

Year	Class	Bike	1	2	3	4	5	6	7	8	9	10	11	12	13	14	15	16	17	18	19	20	Pos	Pts
2019	Moto3	KTM	QAT	ARG	AME	SPA	FRA	ITA	CAT	NED	GER	CZE	AUT	GBR	RSM; 15	ARA	THA	JPN	AUS	MAL	VAL		34th	1
2021	Moto3	KTM	QAT	DOH	POR	SPA	FRA	ITA; 20	CAT; 13	GER; 12	NED; 16	STY	AUT; 23	GBR	ARA	RSM; Ret	AME	EMI	ALR	VAL			27th	7
2022	Moto3	KTM	QAT; 18	INA; 8	ARG; 11	AME; 19	POR; 19	SPA; 16	FRA; 16	ITA; 8	CAT; 17	GER; 14	NED; Ret	GBR; 16	AUT; 20	RSM; 15	ARA; 20	JPN; 16	THA; 18	AUS; 20	MAL; 13	VAL; 17	22nd	27

=== Supersport 300 World Championship ===
==== Races by year ====
(key) (Races in bold indicate pole position; races in italics indicate fastest lap)

Year	Bike	1		2		3		4		5		6		7		8		Pos	Pts
Year	Bike	R1	R2	R1	R2	R1	R2	R1	R2	R1	R2	R1	R2	R1	R2	R1	R2	Pos	Pts
2024	Yamaha	BAR; 11	BAR; 21	ASS; 16	ASS; 6	MIS; Ret	MIS; 8	MOS; 16	MOS; 10	POR; 5	POR; 5	MAG; Ret	MAG; 9	ARA; 17	ARA; 15	JER; 15	JER; 13	13th	63
2025	Yamaha	POR; 15	POR; 8	NED; 14	NED; 15	CZE; 6	CZE; Ret	EMI; 22	EMI; 16	FRA; 25	FRA; 20	ARA; 21	ARA; 19	EST; 15	EST; 19	SPA; 12	SPA; 17	20th	27

=== Sportbike World Championship ===
==== Races by year ====
(key) (Races in bold indicate pole position; races in italics indicate fastest lap)

Year	Bike	1		2		3		4		5		6		7		8		Pos	Pts
Year	Bike	R1	R2	R1	R2	R1	R2	R1	R2	R1	R2	R1	R2	R1	R2	R1	R2	Pos	Pts
2026	Triumph	POR; 23	POR; 5	NED; 7	NED; 14	CZE; 14	CZE; Ret	ARA; 12	ARA; 6	EMI; 8	EMI; 21	FRA; 27	FRA; 10	ITA; 14	ITA; 27	SPA; 10	SPA; 9	14th	67

=== CIV Moto3 Championship ===
==== Races by year ====
(key) (Races in bold indicate pole position; races in italics indicate fastest lap)

Year	Bike	1		2		3		4		5		6		Pos	Pts
Year	Bike	R1	R2	R1	R2	R1	R2	R1	R2	R1	R2	R1	R2	Pos	Pts
2018	KTM	MIS; 3	MIS; 5	MUG; 9	MUG; 6	IMO; 12	IMO; 8	MIS2; Ret	MIS2; Ret	MUG2; 6	MUG2; 5	VAL; 4	VAL; 2	7th	110
2019	KTM	MIS; DNP	MIS; Ret	MUG; 6	MUG; Ret	**IMO**; Ret	**IMO**; 1	MIS2; 3	MIS2; 8	MUG2; Ret	MUG2; 5	VAL; 4	VAL; DSQ	8th	83
2020	KTM	MUG; 3	MUG; 4	MIS; 3	MIS; 3	IMO; Ret	IMO; 6	VAL; Ret	VAL; 1					4th	96
2021	KTM	MUG; 1	MUG; 1	MIS; 2	MIS; 3	IMO; 7	IMO; Ret	MIS2; 4	MIS2; 1	MUG2; 2	MUG2; 2	**VAL**; 1	**VAL**; 1	1st	223
2023	-	MIS	MIS	MUG; 1	MUG; 9	VAL; 2	VAL; Ret	MIS2; 3	MIS2; 2	MUG2; Ret	MUG2; 2	IMO; 2	IMO; Ret	4th	128
2024	BeOn	MIS; 2	MIS; 2	**VAL**; Ret	**VAL**; 2	MUG; 2	MUG; 2	MIS2; Ret	MIS2; 2	MUG2; 1	MUG2; 1	IMO	IMO	3rd	170
2025	CR&S	MIS; 2	MIS; 3	MUG; 3	MUG; 3	VAL; 4	VAL; Ret	MIS2; 2	MIS2; 3	IMO	IMO	MUG2; Ret	MUG2; 2	3rd	153
