= 2026 Sportbike World Championship =

Motorsport championship

2026 Sportbike World Championship
Previous:	2025 (WorldSSP300)	Next:	2027
Support series: Superbike World Championship; Supersport World Championship; Women’s Circuit Racing World Championship; FIM Yamaha R3 BLU BRU World Cup

The 2026 Sportbike World Championship was the first season of the new Sportbike World Championship class. The new class replaced the Supersport 300 World Championship which ran for nine seasons as the support class for the Superbike World Championship from 2017 up to 2025.

Spanish rider Xavier Artigas won the Riders' championship in the final round at Jerez. Team Prodina Kawasaki XCI, the team which fielded runner-up David Salvador won the Teams' championship, with Kawasaki winning the Manufacturers' championship.

== Teams and riders ==
2026 entry list
Team	Constructor	Motorcycle	No.	Rider	Rounds
(Italy) MMR	Aprilia	RS 660 Factory	19	(Vietnam) Luca Agostinelli	8
(Italy) MMR	Aprilia	RS 660 Factory	20	(Netherlands) Jurrien Van Crugten	6–8
(Italy) MMR	Aprilia	RS 660 Factory	41	(Greece) Ioannis Peristeras	1–5
(Italy) MMR	Aprilia	RS 660 Factory	98	(Italy) Thomas Benetti	1–7
(Italy) Revo–M2	Aprilia	RS 660 Factory	11	(Italy) Mattia Sorrenti	All
(Italy) Revo–M2	Aprilia	RS 660 Factory	91	(Italy) Matteo Vannucci	All
(Italy) Team MMP Velocita	Aprilia	RS 660 Factory	25	(Italy) Filippo Bianchi	5
(Italy) PATA AG Motorsport Italia	Honda	CBR600RR	89	(Australia) Taiyo Aksu	5–8
(France) Rac41–Honda	Honda	CBR600RR	36	(France) Diego Poncet	1
(Spain) Deza–Box 77 Racing Team	Kawasaki	ZX-6R 636	16	(Spain) Álvaro Fuertes	All
(Spain) Deza–Box 77 Racing Team	Kawasaki	ZX-6R 636	77	(Spain) José Osuna	All
(Belgium) MTM Kawasaki	Kawasaki	ZX-6R 636	31	(Spain) Roberto Fernández	4
(Belgium) MTM Kawasaki	Kawasaki	ZX-6R 636	31	(Spain) Roberto Fernández	8
(Belgium) MTM Kawasaki	Kawasaki	ZX-6R 636	34	(Spain) Xavier Artigas	All
(Belgium) MTM Kawasaki	Kawasaki	ZX-6R 636	71	(Netherlands) Loris Veneman	1–7
(Spain) Pons Motosport Italika Racing	Kawasaki	ZX-6R 636	39	(Spain) Juan Risueño	All
(Spain) Pons Motosport Italika Racing	Kawasaki	ZX-6R 636	40	(United States) Julian Correa	All
(Italy) Team Prodina Kawasaki XCI	Kawasaki	ZX-6R 636	38	(Spain) David Salvador	All
(Italy) Team Prodina Kawasaki XCI	Kawasaki	ZX-6R 636	47	(Spain) Antonio Torres	All
(Republic of Ireland) Kove Racing Team 109	Kove	450RR	7	(Spain) Beñat Fernández	1–3, 5–8
(Republic of Ireland) Kove Racing Team 109	Kove	450RR	64	(France) Hugo De Cancellis	6–8
(Republic of Ireland) Kove Racing Team 109	Kove	450RR	66	(Germany) Phillip Tonn	1–2
(Republic of Ireland) Kove Racing Team 109	Kove	450RR	67	(Germany) Loris Schönrock	3
(Republic of Ireland) Kove Racing Team 109	Kove	450RR	88	(Spain) Daniel Mogeda	4
(Republic of Ireland) Kove Racing Team 109	Kove	450RR	96	(Denmark) Oliver Svendsen	4
(Republic of Ireland) Kove Racing Team 109	Kove	450RR	99	(Italy) Alessandro Zanca	5
(Netherlands) Track & Trades Wixx Racing	Suzuki	GSX–8R	6	(Netherlands) Jeffrey Buis	1–5, 7–8
(Netherlands) Track & Trades Wixx Racing	Suzuki	GSX–8R	8	(Spain) Marc Vich	6
(Netherlands) Track & Trades Wixx Racing	Suzuki	GSX–8R	65	(Belgium) Ferre Fleerackers	All
(Netherlands) VLR Racing Team Suzuki	Suzuki	GSX–8R	13	(Netherlands) Indi Schunselaar	7–8
(Netherlands) VLR Racing Team Suzuki	Suzuki	GSX–8R	68	(Netherlands) Kas Beekmans	1–6
(Italy) CM Triumph Factory Racing	Triumph	Daytona 660	18	(Italy) Bruno Ieraci	All
(Italy) CM Triumph Factory Racing	Triumph	Daytona 660	23	(Italy) Elia Bartolini	All
(Germany) Freudenberg Rora-Paligo Racing	Triumph	Daytona 660	37	(Czech Republic) Štěpán Zuda	3
(United Kingdom) PHR Performance Triumph	Triumph	Daytona 660	55	(United Kingdom) Harrison Dessoy	All
(United Kingdom) PHR Performance Triumph	Triumph	Daytona 660	73	(United Kingdom) Fenton Seabright	All
(Italy) Team Rosso e Nero Motor Club	Triumph	Daytona 660	17	(Italy) Manuel Rocca	7
(Spain) ARCO Yamaha MotoR University Team	Yamaha	YZF–R7	33	(Spain) Gonzalo Sánchez	All
(Spain) ARCO Yamaha MotoR University Team	Yamaha	YZF–R7	69	(Italy) Alessandro Di Persio	All
(France) GMT94 Yamaha	Yamaha	YZF–R7	94	(France) Amaury Mizera	6
(Netherlands) Indi Racing by Yamaha Ten Kate Racing	Yamaha	YZF–R7	13	(Netherlands) Indi Schunselaar	2
(Portugal) Miguel Oliveira Team	Yamaha	YZF–R7	9	(United Kingdom) Carl Harris	5
(Portugal) Miguel Oliveira Team	Yamaha	YZF–R7	44	(Italy) Mattia Martella	7–8
(Portugal) Miguel Oliveira Team	Yamaha	YZF–R7	61	(Spain) Marcos Ruda	4
(Portugal) Miguel Oliveira Team	Yamaha	YZF–R7	79	(Portugal) Tomás Alonso	1–3, 6
(Czech Republic) Panattoni BGR Smrz Racing	Yamaha	YZF–R7	21	(Czech Republic) Troy Sovička	All
(Czech Republic) Panattoni BGR Smrz Racing	Yamaha	YZF–R7	26	(Italy) Mirko Gennai	All
(Italy) PATA AG Motorsport Italia	Yamaha	YZF–R7	89	(Australia) Taiyo Aksu	1–4
(Indonesia) ProGP NitiRacing	Yamaha	YZF–R7	27	(Indonesia) Felix Mulya	All
(Indonesia) ProGP NitiRacing	Yamaha	YZF–R7	28	(Hungary) Kevin Farkas	7
(Indonesia) ProGP NitiRacing	Yamaha	YZF–R7	29	(France) Bartholomé Perrin	6
(Indonesia) ProGP NitiRacing	Yamaha	YZF–R7	93	(Indonesia) Arai Agaska	1–5, 8
(Italy) Team BrCorse	Yamaha	YZF–R7	43	(Italy) Marco Gaggi	All
(Italy) Team BrCorse	Yamaha	YZF–R7	50	(Australia) Carter Thompson	All
(Brazil) Yamaha AD78 FIMLA by MS Racing	Yamaha	YZF–R7	12	(Brazil) Humberto Maier	All
(Brazil) Yamaha AD78 FIMLA by MS Racing	Yamaha	YZF–R7	92	(France) Gabin Cazard	All

Key
Regular rider
Wildcard rider
Replacement rider

== Race calendar and results ==
The provisional 2026 season calendar was announced on 31 July 2025.

2026 calendar
Round			Circuit	Date	Pole position	Fastest lap	Winning rider	Winning team	Winning constructor	Ref
1	R1	(Portugal) Portuguese Round	Algarve International Circuit	28 March	(Italy) Matteo Vannucci	(Netherlands) Loris Veneman	(Spain) Antonio Torres	(Italy) Team Prodina Kawasaki XCI	(Japan) Kawasaki	
1	R2	(Portugal) Portuguese Round	Algarve International Circuit	29 March		(Italy) Matteo Vannucci	(Netherlands) Loris Veneman	(Belgium) MTM Kawasaki	(Japan) Kawasaki	
2	R1	(Netherlands) Dutch Round	TT Circuit Assen	18 April	(Netherlands) Loris Veneman	(Belgium) Ferre Fleerackers	(Netherlands) Jeffrey Buis	(Netherlands) Track & Trades Wixx Racing	(Japan) Suzuki	
2	R2	(Netherlands) Dutch Round	TT Circuit Assen	19 April		(Spain) Beñat Fernández	(Belgium) Ferre Fleerackers	(Netherlands) Track & Trades Wixx Racing	(Japan) Suzuki	
3	R1	(Czech Republic) Czech Round	Autodrom Most	16 May	(Spain) David Salvador	(Italy) Bruno Ieraci	(Italy) Matteo Vannucci	(Italy) Revo–M2	(Italy) Aprilia	
3	R2	(Czech Republic) Czech Round	Autodrom Most	17 May		(Italy) Matteo Vannucci	(Spain) Antonio Torres	(Italy) Team Prodina Kawasaki XCI	(Japan) Kawasaki	
4	R1	(Aragon) Aragón Round	MotorLand Aragón	30 May	(Spain) David Salvador	(Australia) Carter Thompson	(Spain) David Salvador	(Italy) Team Prodina Kawasaki XCI	(Japan) Kawasaki	
4	R2	(Aragon) Aragón Round	MotorLand Aragón	31 May		(Spain) David Salvador	(Spain) Xavier Artigas	(Belgium) MTM Kawasaki	(Japan) Kawasaki	
5	R1	Emilia-Romagna Round	Misano World Circuit	13 June	(Spain) David Salvador	(United Kingdom) Fenton Seabright	(Italy) Bruno Ieraci	(Italy) CM Triumph Factory Racing	(United Kingdom) Triumph	
5	R2	Emilia-Romagna Round	Misano World Circuit	14 June		(Italy) Matteo Vannucci	(Spain) David Salvador	(Italy) Team Prodina Kawasaki XCI	(Japan) Kawasaki	
6	R1	(France) French Round	Circuit de Nevers Magny-Cours	5 September	(Spain) David Salvador	(United Kingdom) Fenton Seabright	(United Kingdom) Fenton Seabright (Note: David Salvador was the first rider to cross the finish line, but received a penalty of 1 position for exceeding track limits on the final lap. Fenton Seabright, who was the second rider to cross the finish line, thus inherited the win.)	(United Kingdom) PHR Performance Triumph	(United Kingdom) Triumph	
6	R2	(France) French Round	Circuit de Nevers Magny-Cours	6 September		(Spain) Xavier Artigas	(Spain) Xavier Artigas	(Belgium) MTM Kawasaki	(Japan) Kawasaki	
7	R1	(Italy) Italian Round	Cremona Circuit	26 September	(Australia) Carter Thompson	(Spain) Xavier Artigas	(Spain) Xavier Artigas	(Belgium) MTM Kawasaki	(Japan) Kawasaki	
7	R2	(Italy) Italian Round	Cremona Circuit	27 September		(Australia) Carter Thompson	(Australia) Carter Thompson	(Italy) Team BrCorse	(Japan) Yamaha	
8	R1	(Spain) Spanish Round	Circuito de Jerez	17 October	(Spain) David Salvador	(Spain) Álvaro Fuertes	(Spain) Xavier Artigas	(Belgium) MTM Kawasaki	(Japan) Kawasaki	
8	R2	(Spain) Spanish Round	Circuito de Jerez	18 October		(Australia) Carter Thompson	(Australia) Carter Thompson	(Italy) Team BrCorse	(Japan) Yamaha	

== Championship standings ==
=== Scoring system ===
Position	**1st**	**2nd**	**3rd**	**4th**	**5th**	**6th**	**7th**	**8th**	**9th**	**10th**	**11th**	**12th**	**13th**	**14th**	**15th**
Points	25	20	16	13	11	10	9	8	7	6	5	4	3	2	1

=== Riders' championship ===
Pos	Rider	Bike	POR (Portugal)		ASS (Netherlands)		MOS (Czech Republic)		ARA (Spain)		MIS (Emilia-Romagna)		MAG (France)		CRE (Italy)		JER (Spain)		Pts
Pos	Rider	Bike	R1	R2	R1	R2	R1	R2	R1	R2	R1	R2	R1	R2	R1	R2	R1	R2	Pts
1	(Spain) Xavier Artigas	Kawasaki	5	4	2	6	6	Ret	2	1	7	5	4	1	1	**2**	1	8	245
2	(Spain) David Salvador	Kawasaki	2	2	3	4	**3**	3	**1**	Ret	**4**	1	**2**	4	3	5	**22**	4	237
3	(Australia) Carter Thompson	Yamaha	12	14	13	9	Ret	5	6	**2**	3	2	7	2	**5**	1	6	1	193
4	(Spain) Antonio Torres	Kawasaki	1	3	10	10	4	1	4	7	5	10	3	Ret	11	10	5	2	188
5	(Belgium) Ferre Fleerackers	Suzuki	3	9	5	**1**	9	10	18	8	18	12	6	12	7	3	2	Ret	143
6	(United Kingdom) Fenton Seabright	Triumph	Ret	DNS	Ret	25	7	Ret	3	4	6	**3**	1	**3**	4	7	Ret	Ret	127
7	(Italy) Matteo Vannucci	Aprilia	**24**	8	4	2	1	4	5	23	26	7	11	7	13	29	Ret	15	117
8	(Netherlands) Jeffrey Buis	Suzuki	4	6	1	3	2	Ret	10	Ret	9	6	DNS	DNS	18	11	Ret	DNS	112
9	(Spain) Álvaro Fuertes	Kawasaki	8	11	27	23	12	8	11	5	12	13	9	15	6	4	3	**5**	106
10	(Italy) Bruno Ieraci	Triumph	6	10	6	7	8	**2**	DNS	DNS	1	Ret	14	20	12	13	Ret	Ret	97
11	(Spain) José Osuna	Kawasaki	Ret	19	12	17	DNS	9	16	9	11	9	10	5	9	8	4	3	91
12	(United Kingdom) Harrison Dessoy	Triumph	Ret	12	Ret	13	28	6	8	3	21	16	8	8	2	Ret	7	12	90
13	(Netherlands) Loris Veneman	Kawasaki	9	**1**	**Ret**	8	5	Ret	7	Ret	14	Ret	5	6	Ret	Ret			83
14	(Italy) Elia Bartolini	Triumph	23	5	7	14	14	Ret	12	6	8	21	27	10	14	27	10	9	67
15	(Italy) Marco Gaggi	Yamaha	10	15	11	12	21	20	15	11	Ret	8	12	11	8	9	Ret	6	64
16	(Spain) Juan Risueño	Kawasaki	15	27	25	22	27	11	21	20	13	14	13	19	17	6	11	7	38
17	(Italy) Filippo Bianchi	Aprilia									2	4							33
18	(Netherlands) Kas Beekmans	Suzuki	Ret	17	8	5	11	Ret	Ret	Ret	Ret	15	17	13					28
19	(Italy) Mirko Gennai	Yamaha	13	24	14	15	16	13	13	12	15	11	22	16	15	14	20	Ret	25
20	(United States) Julian Correa	Kawasaki	16	16	26	16	17	12	17	10	20	19	18	14	10	30	Ret	11	23
21	(Spain) Beñat Fernández	Kove	DSQ	DSQ	9	11	10	18			Ret	Ret	15	17	25	22	15	16	20
22	(Indonesia) Felix Mulya	Yamaha	Ret	28	28	DNS	13	7	19	DNS	DNS	DNS	21	18	20	18	12	13	19
23	(France) Diego Poncet	Honda	7	7															18
24	(Australia) Taiyo Aksu	Yamaha	17	Ret	24	21	20	15	DNS	17									14
24	(Australia) Taiyo Aksu	Honda									24	18	19	25	24	21	9	10	14
25	(Spain) Gonzalo Sánchez	Yamaha	Ret	Ret	15	19	18	Ret	Ret	13	16	Ret	25	24	Ret	16	8	Ret	12
26	(Italy) Alessandro Di Persio	Yamaha	11	18	17	26	23	19	9	Ret	19	25	24	22	27	25	Ret	DNS	12
27	(Italy) Thomas Benetti	Aprilia	Ret	13	18	28	22	14	Ret	21	10	Ret	23	23	22	15			12
28	(Netherlands) Jurrien Van Crugten	Aprilia											16	9	16	17	13	18	10
29	(Spain) Roberto Fernández	Kawasaki							20	15							14	14	5
30	(Italy) Manuel Rocca	Triumph													19	12			4
31	(Brazil) Humberto Maier	Yamaha	18	22	21	18	19	Ret	14	14	17	Ret	Ret	28	26	19	17	19	4
32	(Italy) Mattia Sorrenti	Aprilia	14	21	Ret	Ret	Ret	16	28	22	22	17	30	32	23	23	16	17	2
33	(Indonesia) Arai Agaska	Yamaha	20	23	22	27	15	Ret	23	Ret	Ret	23					19	23	1
34	(Greece) Ioannis Peristeras	Aprilia	19	20	16	24	25	17	24	16	Ret	20							0
35	(Germany) Phillip Tonn	Kove	DSQ	DSQ	19	20													0
36	(France) Gabin Cazard	Yamaha	21	26	23	Ret	24	21	25	18	Ret	22	26	29	32	24	Ret	20	0
37	(Czech Republic) Troy Sovička	Yamaha	Ret	25	Ret	30	29	Ret	27	24	23	Ret	31	30	29	31	18	Ret	0
38	(Spain) Daniel Mogeda	Kove							22	19									0
39	(France) Bartholomé Perrin	Yamaha											20	21					0
40	(Hungary) Kevin Farkas	Yamaha													21	20			0
41	(Netherlands) Indi Schunselaar	Yamaha			20	29													0
41	(Netherlands) Indi Schunselaar	Suzuki													28	26	21	Ret	0
42	(Vietnam) Luca Agostinelli	Aprilia															Ret	21	0
43	(Portugal) Tomás Alonso	Yamaha	22	29	Ret	Ret	26	DNS					DNS	31					0
44	(France) Hugo De Cancellis	Kove											29	27	30	Ret	Ret	22	0
45	(Italy) Alessandro Zanca	Kove									25	24							0
46	(Italy) Mattia Martella	Yamaha													31	28	Ret	24	0
47	(Spain) Marc Vich	Suzuki											28	26					0
48	(Spain) Marcos Ruda	Yamaha							26	DNS									0
49	(Denmark) Oliver Svendsen	Kove							29	Ret									0
	(France) Amaury Mizera	Yamaha											Ret	DNS					0
	(Czech Republic) Štěpán Zuda	Triumph					DNS	DNS											
	(Germany) Loris Schönrock	Kove					DNQ	DNQ											
	(United Kingdom) Carl Harris	Yamaha									DNQ	DNQ							
Pos	Rider	Bike	POR (Portugal)		ASS (Netherlands)		MOS (Czech Republic)		ARA (Spain)		MIS (Emilia-Romagna)		MAG (France)		CRE (Italy)		JER (Spain)		Pts

Colour	Result
Gold	Winner
Silver	Second place
Bronze	Third place
Green	Points classification
Blue	Non-points classification
Blue	Non-classified finish (NC)
Purple	Retired, not classified (Ret)
Red	Did not qualify (DNQ)
Red	Did not pre-qualify (DNPQ)
Black	Disqualified (DSQ)
White	Did not start (DNS)
White	Withdrew (WD)
White	Race cancelled (C)
Blank	Did not practice (DNP)
Blank	Did not arrive (DNA)
Blank	Excluded (EX)

**Bold** – Pole position
Italics – Fastest lap

=== Teams' championship ===
Pos	Team	Bike No.	POR (Portugal)		ASS (Netherlands)		MOS (Czech Republic)		ARA (Spain)		MIS (Emilia-Romagna)		MAG (France)		CRE (Italy)		JER (Spain)		Pts
Pos	Team	Bike No.	R1	R2	R1	R2	R1	R2	R1	R2	R1	R2	R1	R2	R1	R2	R1	R2	Pts
1	(Italy) Team Prodina Kawasaki XCI	38	2	2	3	4	**3**	3	**1**	Ret	**4**	1	**2**	4	3	5	**22**	4	425
1	(Italy) Team Prodina Kawasaki XCI	47	1	3	10	10	4	1	4	7	5	10	3	Ret	11	10	5	2	425
2	(Belgium) MTM Kawasaki	31							20	15							14	14	333
2	(Belgium) MTM Kawasaki	34	5	4	2	6	6	Ret	2	1	7	5	4	1	1	**2**	1	8	333
2	(Belgium) MTM Kawasaki	71	9	**1**	**Ret**	8	5	Ret	7	Ret	14	Ret	5	6	Ret	Ret			333
3	(Italy) Team BrCorse	43	10	15	11	12	21	20	15	11	Ret	8	12	11	8	9	Ret	6	257
3	(Italy) Team BrCorse	50	12	14	13	9	Ret	5	6	**2**	3	2	7	2	**5**	1	6	1	257
4	(Netherlands) Track & Trades Wixx Racing	6	4	6	1	3	2	Ret	10	Ret	9	6			18	11	Ret	DNS	255
4	(Netherlands) Track & Trades Wixx Racing	8											28	26					255
4	(Netherlands) Track & Trades Wixx Racing	65	3	9	5	**1**	9	10	18	8	18	12	6	12	7	3	2	Ret	255
5	(United Kingdom) PHR Performance Triumph	55	Ret	12	Ret	13	28	6	8	3	21	16	8	8	2	Ret	7	12	217
5	(United Kingdom) PHR Performance Triumph	73	Ret	DNS	Ret	25	7	Ret	3	4	6	**3**	1	**3**	4	7	Ret	Ret	217
6	(Spain) Deza–Box 77 Racing Team	16	8	11	27	23	12	8	11	5	12	13	9	15	6	4	3	**5**	197
6	(Spain) Deza–Box 77 Racing Team	77	Ret	19	12	17	DNS	9	16	9	11	9	10	5	9	8	4	3	197
7	(Italy) CM Triumph Factory Racing	18	6	10	6	7	8	**2**	DNS	DNS	1	Ret	14	20	12	13	Ret	Ret	164
7	(Italy) CM Triumph Factory Racing	23	23	5	7	14	14	Ret	12	6	8	21	27	10	14	27	10	9	164
8	(Italy) Revo–M2	11	14	21	Ret	Ret	Ret	16	28	22	22	17	30	32	23	23	16	17	119
8	(Italy) Revo–M2	91	**24**	8	4	2	1	4	5	23	26	7	11	7	13	29	Ret	15	119
9	(Spain) Pons Motosport Italika Racing	39	15	27	25	22	27	11	21	20	13	14	13	19	17	6	11	7	61
9	(Spain) Pons Motosport Italika Racing	40	16	16	26	16	17	12	17	10	20	19	18	14	10	30	Ret	11	61
10	(Italy) Team MMP Velocita	25									2	4							33
11	(Netherlands) VLR Racing Team Suzuki	13													28	26	21	Ret	28
11	(Netherlands) VLR Racing Team Suzuki	68	Ret	17	8	5	11	Ret	Ret	Ret	Ret	15	17	13					28
12	(Czech Republic) Panattoni BGR Smrz Racing	21	Ret	25	Ret	30	29	Ret	27	24	23	Ret	31	30	29	31	18	Ret	25
12	(Czech Republic) Panattoni BGR Smrz Racing	26	13	24	14	15	16	13	13	12	15	11	22	16	15	14	20	Ret	25
13	(Spain) ARCO Yamaha MotoR University Team	33	Ret	Ret	15	19	18	Ret	Ret	13	16	Ret	25	24	Ret	16	8	Ret	24
13	(Spain) ARCO Yamaha MotoR University Team	69	11	18	17	26	23	19	9	Ret	19	25	24	22	27	25	Ret	DNS	24
14	(Italy) MMR	19															Ret	21	22
14	(Italy) MMR	20											16	9	16	17	13	18	22
14	(Italy) MMR	41	19	20	16	24	25	17	24	16	Ret	20							22
14	(Italy) MMR	98	Ret	13	18	28	22	14	Ret	21	10	Ret	23	23	22	15			22
15	(Indonesia) ProGP NitiRacing	27	Ret	28	28	DNS	13	7	19	DNS	DNS	DNS	21	18	20	18	12	13	20
15	(Indonesia) ProGP NitiRacing	28													21	20			20
15	(Indonesia) ProGP NitiRacing	29											20	21					20
15	(Indonesia) ProGP NitiRacing	93	20	23	22	27	15	Ret	23	Ret	Ret	23					19	23	20
16	(Republic of Ireland) Kove Racing Team 109	7	DSQ	DSQ	9	11	10	18			Ret	Ret	15	17	25	22	15	16	20
16	(Republic of Ireland) Kove Racing Team 109	64											29	27	30	Ret	Ret	22	20
16	(Republic of Ireland) Kove Racing Team 109	66	DSQ	DSQ	19	20													20
16	(Republic of Ireland) Kove Racing Team 109	67					DNQ	DNQ											20
16	(Republic of Ireland) Kove Racing Team 109	88							22	19									20
16	(Republic of Ireland) Kove Racing Team 109	96							29	Ret									20
16	(Republic of Ireland) Kove Racing Team 109	99									25	24							20
17	(France) Rac41–Honda	36	7	7															18
18	(Italy) PATA AG Motorsport Italia	89	17	Ret	24	21	20	15	DNS	17	24	18	19	25	24	21	9	10	14
19	(Italy) Team Rosso e Nero Motor Club	17													19	12			4
20	(Brazil) Yamaha AD78 FIMLA by MS Racing	12	18	22	21	18	19	Ret	14	14	17	Ret	Ret	28	26	19	17	19	4
20	(Brazil) Yamaha AD78 FIMLA by MS Racing	92	21	26	23	Ret	24	21	25	18	Ret	22	26	29	32	24	Ret	20	4
21	(Netherlands) Indi Racing by Yamaha Ten Kate Racing	13			20	29													0
22	(Portugal) Miguel Oliveira Team	9									DNQ	DNQ							0
22	(Portugal) Miguel Oliveira Team	44													31	28	Ret	21	0
22	(Portugal) Miguel Oliveira Team	61							26	DNS									0
22	(Portugal) Miguel Oliveira Team	79	22	29	Ret	Ret	26	DNS					DNS	31					0
	(France) GMT94 Yamaha	94											Ret	DNS					0
	(Germany) Freudenberg Rora-Paligo Racing	37					DNS	DNS											0
Pos	Team	Bike No.	POR (Portugal)		ASS (Netherlands)		MOS (Czech Republic)		ARA (Spain)		MIS (Emilia-Romagna)		MAG (France)		CRE (Italy)		JER (Spain)		Pts

=== Manufacturers' championship ===
Pos	Manufacturer	POR (Portugal)		ASS (Netherlands)		MOS (Czech Republic)		ARA (Spain)		MIS (Emilia-Romagna)		MAG (France)		CRE (Italy)		JER (Spain)		Pts
Pos	Manufacturer	R1	R2	R1	R2	R1	R2	R1	R2	R1	R2	R1	R2	R1	R2	R1	R2	Pts
1	(Japan) Kawasaki	1	1	2	4	3	1	1	1	5	1	2	1	1	2	1	2	345
2	(United Kingdom) Triumph	6	5	6	7	7	2	3	3	1	3	1	3	2	7	7	9	228
3	(Japan) Yamaha	10	14	11	9	13	5	6	2	3	2	7	2	5	1	6	1	200
4	(Japan) Suzuki	3	6	1	1	2	10	10	8	9	6	6	12	7	3	2	Ret	192
5	(Italy) Aprilia	14	8	4	2	1	4	5	16	2	4	11	7	13	15	13	15	147
6	(Japan) Honda	7	7							24	18	19	25	24	21	9	10	31
7	(China) Kove	DSQ	DSQ	9	11	10	18	22	19	25	24	15	17	25	22	15	16	20
Pos	Manufacturer	POR (Portugal)		ASS (Netherlands)		MOS (Czech Republic)		ARA (Spain)		MIS (Emilia-Romagna)		MAG (France)		CRE (Italy)		JER (Spain)		Pts
