= Aldi Satya Mahendra =

Indonesian motorcycle racer (born 2006)

Aldi Mahendra
- Nationality: Indonesian
- Born: 27 June 2006 (age 20); Bantul, Indonesia
- Current team: AS Racing Team
- Bike number: 57
Motorcycle racing career statistics
Supersport World Championship
Active years	2025–
Manufacturers	Yamaha
Championships	0
2025 championship position	17th (73 pts)
Starts / Wins / Podiums / Poles / F. laps / Points; 40 / 0 / 2 / 0 / 1 / 205
Supersport 300 World Championship
Active years	2022–2024
Manufacturers	Yamaha
Championships	1 (2024)
2024 championship position	1st (221 pts)
Starts / Wins / Podiums / Poles / F. laps / Points; 20 / 2 / 7 / 2 / 2 / 264

Aldi Satya Mahendra (born 27 June 2006) is an Indonesian motorcycle racer who is set to compete in the 2026 Supersport World Championship with AS Racing Team aboard a Yamaha. He is a former champion of the Supersport 300 World Championship, having won the title in 2024, and is the first and only Indonesian rider to win a motorcycle racing world championship.

== Career ==
Mahendra made his motorcycle racing debut in 2015 at the age of nine, racing in the Indonesian Racing Series. He would move to the international road racing scene in 2019, competing in the Asia Road Racing Championship for Yamaha Racing Indonesia, and moved up to the Asia Production 250 class for 2022 after spending 2021 away from the racetrack due to the COVID-19 pandemic.

As the reigning SSP300 world champion, Mahendra moved up to the FIM Supersport World Championship with a Yamaha-supported team for the 2025 season.

== Personal life ==
Mahendra is the son of Dicky Hestu Prahendra and Desy Prasanti, both of whom competed in motorcycle racing at a national level in the 1990s. His older brother, Galang Hendra Pratama, is also a professional motorcycle racer.

== Career statistics ==
=== Yamaha R3 bLU cRU European Cup ===
==== Races by year ====
(key) (Races in bold indicate pole position, races in italics indicate fastest lap)

Year	Bike	1	2	3	4	5	6	7	8	9	10	11	12	Pos	Pts
2023	Yamaha YZF-R3	**NED**; 12	**NED**; 7	**CAT**; 2	**CAT**; 13	MIS; 3	MIS; 1	DON; Ret	DON; 1	IMO; 1	IMO; 1	**FRA**; DNS	**FRA**; 1	2nd	177

=== Supersport 300 World Championship ===
==== Races by year ====
(key) (Races in bold indicate pole position; races in italics indicate fastest lap)

Year	Bike	1	2	3	4	5	6	7	8	9	10	11	12	13	14	15	16	Pos	Pts
2022	Yamaha	ARA; 1	ARA; 2	ASS; 1	ASS; 2	EST; 1	EST; 2	MIS; 1	MIS; 2	MOS; 1	MOS; 2	MAG; 1	MAG; 2	BAR; 1; 7	BAR; 2; 8	POR; 1	POR; 2	26th	17
2023	Yamaha	ASS; 1	ASS; 2	BAR; 1	BAR; 2	MIS; 1	MIS; 2	IMO; 1	IMO; 2	MOS; 1; 16	MOS; 2; 1	MAG; 1	MAG; 2	ARA; 1	ARA; 2	POR; 1	POR; 2	22nd	25
2024	Yamaha	BAR; 1; 2	BAR; 2; 8	ASS; 1; 8	**ASS**; **2**; 11	MIS; 1; 2	MIS; 2; 1	MOS; 1; 8	MOS; 2; 3	POR; 1; 6	POR; 2; 8	**MAG**; **1**; 2	MAG; 2; 3	ARA; 1; 5	ARA; 2; 2	JER; 1; 3	JER; 2; 6	1st	221

=== Supersport World Championship ===
==== By season ====
Season	Motorcycle	Team	Race	Win	Podium	Pole	FLap	Pts	Plcd
2025	Yamaha YZF-R9	Evan Bros. WorldSSP Yamaha Team	16	0	0	0	0	73	17th
2026	Yamaha YZF-R9	AS Racing Team	24	0	2	0	1	132	13th
Total			**40**	**0**	**2**	**0**	**1**	**205**	

==== By year ====
(key) (Races in bold indicate pole position; races in italics indicate fastest lap)

Year	Bike	1		2		3		4		5		6		7		8		9		10		11		12		Pos	Pts
Year	Bike	R1	R2	R1	R2	R1	R2	R1	R2	R1	R2	R1	R2	R1	R2	R1	R2	R1	R2	R1	R2	R1	R2	R1	R2	Pos	Pts
2025	Yamaha	AUS; Ret	AUS; 13	POR; 20	POR; 15	NED; 8	NED; 8	ITA; 9	ITA; 10	CZE; 5	CZE; 7	EMI; 31	EMI; 13	GBR; 10	GBR; 14	HUN; 11	HUN; 12	FRA	FRA	ARA	ARA	POR	POR	SPA	SPA	17th	73
2026	Yamaha	AUS; 13	AUS; 2	POR; 23	POR; Ret	NED; 15	NED; 14	HUN; 9	HUN; 8	CZE; 31	CZE; 4	ARA; 6	ARA; 5	EMI; 12	EMI; 3	GBR; 9	GBR; 7	FRA; 8	FRA; 9	ITA; 10	ITA; Ret	EST; 16	EST; Ret	SPA; 19	SPA; 17	13th	132

=== Asia Road Racing Championship ===
==== Races by year ====
(key) (Races in bold indicate pole position; races in italics indicate fastest lap)

Year	Bike	Class	1	2	3	4	5	6	7	8	9	10	11	12	Pos	Pts
2019	Yamaha	UB150	SEP; 1; 7	SEP; 2 Ret	BUR; 1; 10	BUR; 2; 21	SUZ; 1 Ret	SUZ; 2; 1	**ZIC**; **1**; 3	**ZIC**; **2**; 7	SEP; 1; 12	SEP; 2; 3	BUR; 1; 5	BUR; 2; 18	6th	96
2022	Yamaha	AP250	BUR; 1; 12	BUR; 2; 4	SEP; 1; 6	SEP; 2; 4	SUG; 1 Ret	SUG; 2; 2	SEP; 1; 2	SEP; 2; 3	BUR; 1; 5	BUR; 2; 13			5th	110
2023	Yamaha	AP250	BUR; 1	BUR; 2	SEP; 1	SEP; 2	SUG; 1	SUG; 2	MAN; 1; 2	MAN; 2 Ret	ZIC; 1	ZIC; 2	BUR; 1	BUR; 2	17th	20
2025	Yamaha	SSP600	CHA	CHA	SEP	SEP	MOT	MOT	MAN	MAN	SEP	SEP	CHA; 3	CHA; 2	17th	36

=== Mandalika Racing Series ===
==== Races by year ====
(key) (Races in bold indicate pole position; races in italics indicate fastest lap)

Year	Team	Bike	Class	Round 1			Round 2			Round 3			Round 4			Round 5			Pos	Pts
Year	Team	Bike	Class	R1	SP	R2	R1	SP	R2	R1	SP	R2	R1	SP	R2	R1	SP	R2	Pos	Pts
2023	Yamaha LFN HP969 HDS RCB NHK Proliner SSS NGK Navaro Racing Team	Yamaha	National Sport 150cc	MAN1		MAN2	MAN1		MAN2	MAN1; 2		MAN2; 1							N/A	N/A
2023	Yamaha BAF Yamalube Akai Jaya MBKW2 Racing	Yamaha	National Sport 250cc	MAN1		MAN2	MAN1		MAN2	MAN1; 9		MAN2; 11							N/A	N/A
2024	YMH BAF Yamalube Akai Jaya MBKW2 Racing	Yamaha	National Sport 250cc	MAN1		MAN2	MAN1; Ret		MAN2; Ret	MAN1		MAN2	MAN1		MAN2	MAN1		MAN2	N/A	N/A

== FIM Intercontinental Games results ==
Year	Venue	Class	Team	Bike	No	Rider	Race		Points	TC
Year	Venue	Class	Team	Bike	No	Rider	R1	R2	Points	TC
2024	City of Jerez	SS300	FIM Asia	Yamaha YZF-R3	11	(Indonesia) Aldi Satya Mahendra	1	3	176	2nd
2024	City of Jerez	SS300	FIM Asia	Yamaha YZF-R3	12	(Philippines) Paz McKinley	12	Ret	176	2nd
2024	City of Jerez	SS300	FIM Asia	Yamaha YZF-R3	15	(Malaysia) Farres Putra	9	7	176	2nd
2024	City of Jerez	SS300	FIM Asia	Yamaha YZF-R3	16	(Japan) Miu Nakahara	16	13	176	2nd
