= Humberto Maier =

Brazilian motorcycle racer

- Nationality: Brazilian
- Born: October 28, 2005 (age 21); Osasco, Brazil
- Current team: AD78 Team Brasil by MS Racing
- Bike number: 12
- Website: https://www.instagram.com/turquinhojr12/
Motorcycle racing career statistics
Supersport 300 World Championship
Active years	2022–2025
Manufacturers	Yamaha
Championships	0
2025 championship position	8th (139 pts)
Starts / Wins / Podiums / Poles / F. laps / Points; 58 / 0 / 7 / 2 / 0 / 352

Humberto Maier (born October 28, 2005, in Osasco) is a Brazilian motorcycle racer. He rides for AD78 Team Brasil by MS Racing alongside fellow Brazilian Kevin Fontainha.

Maier is 16 years old and has had a passion for motorcycle racing since he was a child; his father is a passionate motorcyclist and has always raced as an amateur and professionally.

Maier has followed this passion since he was seven years old, and began riding motorcycles on the track.

Maier has been charting his career in motorcycling since he was a child. In 2015, he started in Super Bike Brasil, and mid-season, he joined the Honda Junior Cup. In 2016, he switched to the Super Street category, where he raced a 300cc motorcycle. That season, he started the championship with Alex Barros' Estrella Galicia team, and in August 2016, he made his second Super Street debut, this time in the Yamaha R3 Cup, for the Fast Kids team, supported by PRT.

In 2017, Maier made his debut as a Yamaha rider, competing in the 300cc category in Super Bike Brasil for the PlayStation Racing Team, Yamaha's official team in the Yamaha R3Cup STK category.

In the 2019 Yamaha R3 Cup season, Maier became the Brazilian champion of the category, a feat he repeated in 2020, becoming a two-time Brazilian champion.

Maier made his debut in the 2019 Moto 1000 GP Championship in the GP3 of the Americas, where he won the GP3-R3 Super Sport 300cc category.

In 2021, Maier traveled to Europe with Yamaha to compete in the R3 bLU cRU European Cup, where he had an excellent championship, leading several races, winning in the Netherlands, and finishing second in France. He finished sixth overall. In 2021, he was selected as a standout rider in Europe and, as a result, was selected for the Mastercamp training, held at Valentino Rossi's Ranch. Once a year, the world's top young riders are selected for a week of training with Valentino Rossi and his team.

In 2022, Maier competed in the World Superbike Championship for Yamaha in the WSSP300 category, a highly competitive championship in which he excelled in several races. In the Portuguese round, in Portimão, he finished third and finished thirteenth.

== Career statistics ==
=== Statistics in the Supersport 300 World Championship ===
Season	Team	Moto	Run	Wins	Second	Third	Poles	FL Round	Points	Result
2022	AD78 Team Brasil by MS Racing	Yamaha YZF-R3	16	–	–	1	–	–	69	13.
2023	AD78 Team Brasil by MS Racing	Yamaha YZF-R3	16	–	1	2	1	–	113	7.
2024	MS Racing	Yamaha YZF-R3	10	–	–	–	–	–	31	22.
2025	AD78 Team Brasil by MS Racing	Yamaha YZF-R3	16	–	1	2	–	–	139	8.
Total			58	0	3	5	1	0	352	

=== Asia Road Racing Championship ===
==== Races by year ====
(key) (Races in bold indicate pole position; races in italics indicate fastest lap)

Year	Class	Bike	1		2		3		4		5		6		Pos	Pts
Year	Class	Bike	R1	R2	R1	R2	R1	R2	R1	R2	R1	R2	R1	R2	Pos	Pts
2025	AP250	Honda	BUR	BUR	SEP	SEP	MOT	MOT	MAN	MAN	SEP	SEP	BUR; Ret	BUR; Ret	NC	0

=== Sportbike World Championship ===
==== Races by year ====
(key) (Races in bold indicate pole position; races in italics indicate fastest lap)

Year	Bike	1		2		3		4		5		6		7		8		Pos	Pts
Year	Bike	R1	R2	R1	R2	R1	R2	R1	R2	R1	R2	R1	R2	R1	R2	R1	R2	Pos	Pts
2026	Yamaha	POR; 18	POR; 22	NED; 21	NED; 18	CZE; 19	CZE; Ret	ARA; 14	ARA; 14	EMI; 17	EMI; Ret	FRA	FRA	ITA	ITA	SPA	SPA	27th*	4*
