= Jeffrey Buis =

Dutch motorcycle racer

- Nationality: Dutch
- Born: 27 December 2001 (age 24); Meppel, Netherlands
- Current team: Freudenberg KTM-Paligo Racing
- Bike number: 6
- Website: https://www.jeffrey-buis.nl/
Motorcycle racing career statistics
Supersport World Championship
Active years	2021-2022
Manufacturers	Kawasaki
Championships	0
2022 championship position	NC (0 pts)
Starts / Wins / Podiums / Poles / F. laps / Points; 22 / 0 / 0 / 0 / 0 / 2
Supersport 300 World Championship
Active years	2019–2021, 2023–
Manufacturers	Kawasaki, KTM
Championships	2 (2020, 2023)
2025 championship position	5th (166 pts)
Starts / Wins / Podiums / Poles / F. laps / Points; 78 / 16 / 27 / 2 / 4 / 900

Jeffrey Buis (born 27 December 2001) is a Dutch motorcycle racer. He achieved the title of world champion in the Supersport 300 category at the Estoril Circuit in 2020 and at the Algarve International Circuit in 2023.

== Career ==
Buis made his debut at the Yamaha R3 Cup in 2018, winning his inaugural race. The second round of the Yamaha R3 Cup took place on the Oschersleben track, where he obtained second place.

On 7 December 2018, Dutch outfit MTM Motoport announced Buis and Dion Otten as their new riders for the 2019 Supersport 300 World Championship, in addition to Scott Deroue and Robert Schotman, all equipped with Kawasaki Ninja 400s.

In his debut season in a world championship, Buis achieved an eighth place as his best finish at the Magny-Cours circuit and finished the season in fourteenth position overall. He continued in the Supersport 300 world championship also in the 2020 season, always with the MTM Motoport team. He obtained his first podium, a second place, in race 1 of the Portimão Grand Prix, in a race interrupted by a red flag a few laps from the end, when Ana Carrasco led the race, was followed by Buis who was only 0.057s behind second and with the third classified more than four seconds off the lead. On August 29, Buis took his first pole position and won his first race during the Aragon Grand Prix and the next day he won his second consecutive race.

In Portimao 2023, Buis finished as the 11th driver on the track. With a place in the top-13, he would regain the world champion title. This racer from Steenwijkerwold wrote history by being the first person to win two WorldSSP 300 titles. Buis immediately received congratulations from his compatriots Loris Veneman and Ruben Bijman, and was later extensively honored in the parc fermé.

== Career statistics ==
=== Supersport World Championship ===
==== Races by year ====
(key) (Races in bold indicate pole position, races in italics indicate fastest lap)

Year	Bike	1		2		3		4		5		6		7		8		9		10		11		12		Pos	Pts
Year	Bike	R1	R2	R1	R2	R1	R2	R1	R2	R1	R2	R1	R2	R1	R2	R1	R2	R1	R2	R1	R2	R1	R2	R1	R2	Pos	Pts
2021	Kawasaki	SPA	SPA	POR	POR	ITA	ITA	NED	NED	CZE	CZE	SPA	SPA	FRA	FRA	SPA	SPA	SPA	SPA	POR	POR	ARG; 18	ARG; 15	INA; 16	INA; 15	46th	2
2022	Kawasaki	SPA; Ret	SPA; 18	NED; 18	NED; 20	POR; 25	POR; 17	ITA; Ret	ITA; 27	GBR; 21	GBR; 20	CZE; 25	CZE; 21	FRA; 26	FRA; 25	SPA; 27	SPA; 26	POR; 24	POR; Ret	ARG	ARG	INA	INA	AUS	AUS	NC	0

=== Supersport 300 World Championship ===
==== Races by year ====
(key) (Races in bold indicate pole position; races in italics indicate fastest lap)

Year	Bike	1	2	3	4	5	6	7	8	9	10	Pos	Pts
2019	Kawasaki	SPA	NED; 13	ITA	SPA; 9	SPA; 14	ITA; 15	GBR	POR	FRA; 8	QAT; 12	14th	25

Year	Bike	1		2		3		4		5		6		7		8		Pos	Pts
Year	Bike	R1	R2	R1	R2	R1	R2	R1	R2	R1	R2	R1	R2	R1	R2	R1	R2	Pos	Pts
2020	Kawasaki	SPA; Ret	SPA; 12	POR; 2	POR; 4	**SPA**; 1	**SPA**; 1	SPA; 2	SPA; 1	SPA; 5	SPA; 3	FRA; 1	FRA; 2	POR; 6	POR; 9			1st	221
2021	Kawasaki	SPA; 6	SPA; 12	ITA; Ret	ITA; 7	NED; 3	NED; 4	CZE; 7	CZE; 1	FRA; Ret	FRA; 3	SPA; 1	SPA; 7	SPA; 1	SPA; 4	POR; Ret	POR; Ret	3rd	174
2023	Kawasaki	NED; 8	NED; Ret	SPA; 1	SPA; 3	EMI; 11	EMI; Ret	**ITA**; 3	**ITA**; 4	CZE; 9	CZE; 7	FRA; 1	FRA; 1	SPA; 2	SPA; 1	POR; 8	POR; 11	1st	207
2024	KTM	BAR; 1	BAR; 17	ASS; Ret	ASS; DNS	MIS; 6	MIS; 2	MOS; 21	MOS; Ret	POR; 7	POR; 7	MAG; 4	MAG; 1	ARA; 9	ARA; 8	JER; 18	JER; 10	5th	132
2025	KTM	POR; 1	POR; Ret	NED; 1	NED; 1	CZE; 23	CZE; 1	EMI; 8	EMI; 10	FRA; 5	FRA; Ret	ARA; 10	ARA; Ret	EST; 11	EST; 7	SPA; 6	SPA; 5	5th	166

=== Sportbike World Championship ===
==== Races by year ====
(key) (Races in bold indicate pole position; races in italics indicate fastest lap)

Year	Bike	1		2		3		4		5		6		7		8		Pos	Pts
Year	Bike	R1	R2	R1	R2	R1	R2	R1	R2	R1	R2	R1	R2	R1	R2	R1	R2	Pos	Pts
2026	Suzuki	POR; 4	POR; 6	NED; 1	NED; 3	CZE; 2	CZE; Ret	ARA; 10	ARA; Ret	EMI; 9	EMI; 6	FRA; DNS	FRA; DNS	ITA; 18	ITA; 11	SPA; Ret	SPA; DNS	8th	112
