= 2025 Supersport 300 World Championship =

Motorsport championship

2025 Supersport 300 World Championship
Previous:	2024	Next:	2026 (WorldSPB)
Support series: Superbike World Championship; Supersport World Championship; Women’s Circuit Racing World Championship; Yamaha R3 bLU cRU FIM World Cup

The 2025 Supersport 300 World Championship was a part of the 38th season of the Superbike World Championship. It was the final edition of the championship, with a new category set to replace it in 2026. The championship consisted of 16 races across 8 venues.

Beñat Fernández won the championship title at the final round in Jerez.

== Race calendar and results ==
The provisional 2025 season calendar was announced on 11 October 2024.

2025 calendar
Round			Circuit	Date	Pole position	Fastest lap	Winning rider	Winning team	Winning constructor	Ref
1	R1	(Portugal) Portuguese Round	Algarve International Circuit	29 March	(Spain) Beñat Fernández	(Spain) David Salvador	(Netherlands) Jeffrey Buis	(Germany) Freudenberg KTM-Paligo Racing	(Austria) KTM	
1	R2	(Portugal) Portuguese Round	Algarve International Circuit	30 March		(Spain) Julio Garcia González	(Spain) Beñat Fernández	(Republic of Ireland) Team#109 Retro Traffic Kove	(China) Kove	
2	R1	(Netherlands) Dutch Round	TT Circuit Assen	12 April	(Spain) Julio Garcia González	(Spain) Beñat Fernández	(Netherlands) Jeffrey Buis	(Germany) Freudenberg KTM-Paligo Racing	(Austria) KTM	
2	R2	(Netherlands) Dutch Round	TT Circuit Assen	13 April		(Spain) Beñat Fernández	(Netherlands) Jeffrey Buis	(Germany) Freudenberg KTM-Paligo Racing	(Austria) KTM	
3	R1	(Czech Republic) Czech Round	Autodrom Most	17 May	(Brazil) Humberto Maier	(Spain) David Salvador	(Spain) Julio Garcia González	(Italy) ProDina Kawasaki Racing Sport	(Japan) Kawasaki	
3	R2	(Czech Republic) Czech Round	Autodrom Most	18 May		(Spain) Julio Garcia González	(Netherlands) Jeffrey Buis	(Germany) Freudenberg KTM-Paligo Racing	(Austria) KTM	
4	R1	Emilia-Romagna Round	Misano World Circuit Marco Simoncelli	14 June	(Spain) Antonio Torres Domínguez	(Australia) Carter Thompson	(Australia) Carter Thompson	(Belgium) MTM Kawasaki	(Japan) Kawasaki	
4	R2	Emilia-Romagna Round	Misano World Circuit Marco Simoncelli	15 June		(Spain) Beñat Fernández	(Spain) Beñat Fernández	(Republic of Ireland) Team #109 Retro Traffic Kove	(China) Kove	
5	R1	(France) French Round	Circuit de Nevers Magny-Cours	6 September	(Netherlands) Loris Veneman	(Italy) Matteo Vannucci	(Netherlands) Loris Veneman	(Belgium) MTM Kawasaki	(Japan) Kawasaki	
5	R2	(France) French Round	Circuit de Nevers Magny-Cours	7 September		(Spain) Beñat Fernández	(Spain) David Salvador	(Italy) Team Prodina XCI	(Japan) Kawasaki	
6	R1	(Aragon) Aragón Round	MotorLand Aragón	27 September	(Italy) Matteo Vannucci	(Spain) Juan Risueño	(Australia) Carter Thompson	(Belgium) MTM Kawasaki	(Japan) Kawasaki	
6	R2	(Aragon) Aragón Round	MotorLand Aragón	28 September		(Spain) Antonio Torres Domínguez	(Italy) Matteo Vannucci	(Italy) PATA AG Motorsport Italia WSSP300	(Japan) Yamaha	
7	R1	(Portugal) Estoril Round	Circuito do Estoril	11 October	(Italy) Matteo Vannucci	(Spain) Beñat Fernández	(Italy) Matteo Vannucci	(Italy) PATA AG Motorsport Italia WSSP300	(Japan) Yamaha	
7	R2	(Portugal) Estoril Round	Circuito do Estoril	12 October		(Spain) José Manuel Osuna Saez	(Australia) Carter Thompson	(Belgium) MTM Kawasaki	(Japan) Kawasaki	
8	R1	(Spain) Spanish Round	Circuito de Jerez	18 October	(Italy) Matteo Vannucci	(Australia) Carter Thompson	(Italy) Matteo Vannucci	(Italy) PATA AG Motorsport Italia WSSP300	(Japan) Yamaha	
8	R2	(Spain) Spanish Round	Circuito de Jerez	19 October		(Austria) Jakob Rosenthaler	(Spain) Beñat Fernández	(Republic of Ireland) Team #109 Retro Traffic Kove	(China) Kove	

== Entry list ==
2025 entry list
Team	Constructor	Motorcycle	No	Rider	Rounds
(Czech Republic) Accolade Funds Smrž Racing BGR	Kawasaki	Ninja 400	11	(Czech Republic) Filip Novotny	1–4
(Czech Republic) Accolade Funds Smrž Racing BGR	Kawasaki	Ninja 400	21	(Czech Republic) Troy Sovička	5–8
(Czech Republic) Accolade Funds Smrž Racing BGR	Kawasaki	Ninja 400	85	(Italy) Kevin Sabatucci	All
(Belgium) Kawasaki Junior Team by MTM	Kawasaki	Ninja 400	13	(Spain) Roberto Fernández	All
(Belgium) Kawasaki Junior Team by MTM	Kawasaki	Ninja 400	29	(Italy) Giacomo Zannini	5–8
(Belgium) Kawasaki Junior Team by MTM	Kawasaki	Ninja 400	53	(Czech Republic) Petr Svoboda	1–4
(Italy) Kawasaki GP Project	Kawasaki	Ninja 400	8	(Spain) Ivan Muñoz	4–8
(Italy) Kawasaki GP Project	Kawasaki	Ninja 400	9	(Italy) Emiliano Ercolani	1–3, 5–8
(Italy) Kawasaki GP Project	Kawasaki	Ninja 400	18	(Spain) Pablo Olivares	4
(Italy) Kawasaki GP Project	Kawasaki	Ninja 400	29	(Italy) Giacomo Zannini	1–3
(Portugal) Marcos Car Racing Team	Kawasaki	Ninja 400	68	(Portugal) Martim Garcia	7
(Belgium) MTM Kawasaki	Kawasaki	Ninja 400	26	(Italy) Mirko Gennai	1–4
(Belgium) MTM Kawasaki	Kawasaki	Ninja 400	50	(Australia) Carter Thompson	All
(Belgium) MTM Kawasaki	Kawasaki	Ninja 400	71	(Netherlands) Loris Veneman	5–8
(Spain) Pons Motosport Italika Racing	Kawasaki	Ninja 400	25	(Spain) Daniel Ocete	4–6, 8
(Spain) Pons Motosport Italika Racing	Kawasaki	Ninja 400	79	(Portugal) Tomás Alonso	All
(Spain) Pons Motosport Italika Racing	Kawasaki	Ninja 400	88	(Spain) Daniel Mogeda	2–8
(Italy) ProDina Kawasaki Racing Sport	Kawasaki	Ninja 400	26	(Italy) Mirko Gennai	5
(Italy) ProDina Kawasaki Racing Sport	Kawasaki	Ninja 400	48	(Spain) Julio García González	1–4, 6–8
(France) Team Flembbo – Racing DEveloppement	Kawasaki	Ninja 400	99	(France) Romeo Moneyron	5
(Italy) Team ProDina XCI	Kawasaki	Ninja 400	38	(Spain) David Salvador	All
(Italy) Team ProDina XCI	Kawasaki	Ninja 400	47/74	(Spain) Antonio Torres Domínguez	All
(Czech Republic) Rohac & Fejta Motoracing Team	Kawasaki	Ninja 400	86	(Czech Republic) Daniel Tureček	3
(Spain) ZAPPAS-Deza-Box 77 Racing Team	Kawasaki	Ninja 400	16	(Spain) Uriel Hidalgo	1–3, 6–8
(Spain) ZAPPAS-Deza-Box 77 Racing Team	Kawasaki	Ninja 400	29	(Italy) Giacomo Zannini	4
(Spain) ZAPPAS-Deza-Box 77 Racing Team	Kawasaki	Ninja 400	37	(Colombia) Tomás Marín	6
(Spain) ZAPPAS-Deza-Box 77 Racing Team	Kawasaki	Ninja 400	75	(France) Pierre Perinard	5
(Spain) ZAPPAS-Deza-Box 77 Racing Team	Kawasaki	Ninja 400	77	(Spain) José Manuel Osuna Saez	All
(Germany) Freudenberg KTM-Paligo Racing	KTM	RC 390 R	6	(Netherlands) Jeffrey Buis	All
(Germany) Freudenberg KTM-Paligo Racing	KTM	RC 390 R	66	(Germany) Phillip Tonn	1, 5–8
(Germany) Freudenberg KTM-Paligo Racing	KTM	RC 390 R	78	(Austria) Jakob Rosenthaler	3–4
(Germany) Freudenberg KTM-Paligo Racing	KTM	RC 390 R	78	(Austria) Jakob Rosenthaler	5–8
(Republic of Ireland) Team #109 Retro Traffic Kove	Kove	321 RR-S	7	(Spain) Beñat Fernández	All
(Italy) RaceStar Trasimeno	Yamaha	YZF-R3	4	(Italy) Emanuele Cazzaniga	1–6
(Italy) RaceStar Trasimeno	Yamaha	YZF-R3	15	(Hungary) Lukács Hamilton	7–8
(Spain) ARCO SASH MotoR University Team	Yamaha	YZF-R3	32	(Thailand) Krittapat Keankum	4
(Spain) ARCO SASH MotoR University Team	Yamaha	YZF-R3	33	(Spain) Gonzalo Sánchez	1, 3–8
(Spain) ARCO SASH MotoR University Team	Yamaha	YZF-R3	40	(China) Shuncheng Zhang	7–8
(Spain) ARCO SASH MotoR University Team	Yamaha	YZF-R3	55	(Spain) Unai Calatayud	1, 3–8
(Spain) ARCO SASH MotoR University Team	Yamaha	YZF-R3	58	(Germany) Valentin Folger	2
(Spain) ARCO SASH MotoR University Team	Yamaha	YZF-R3	69	(Italy) Alessandro Di Persio	2
(Indonesia) ProGP NitiRacing	Yamaha	YZF-R3	19	(Indonesia) Decksa Alfarezel	6–7
(Indonesia) ProGP NitiRacing	Yamaha	YZF-R3	27	(Indonesia) Felix Putra Mulya	All
(Indonesia) ProGP NitiRacing	Yamaha	YZF-R3	36	(Indonesia) Faerozi Toreqottullah	1–4
(Indonesia) ProGP NitiRacing	Yamaha	YZF-R3	93	(Indonesia) Arai Agaska	5, 8
(Italy) Team BrCorse	Yamaha	YZF-R3	23	(Italy) Elia Bartolini	All
(Italy) Team BrCorse	Yamaha	YZF-R3	43	(Italy) Marco Gaggi	All
(Spain) MS Racing	Yamaha	YZF-R3	39	(Spain) Juan Risueño	All
(Italy) Yamaha Motoxracing WorldSSP300 Team	Yamaha	YZF-R3	61	(Italy) Gianmaria Ibidi	3–8
(Italy) Yamaha Motoxracing WorldSSP300 Team	Yamaha	YZF-R3	87	(Australia) Cameron Swain	1–2
(Italy) Yamaha Motoxracing WorldSSP300 Team	Yamaha	YZF-R3	96	(Spain) Marc Vich Gil	All
(Brazil) Yamaha AD78 FIMLA by MS Racing	Yamaha	YZF-R3	12	(Brazil) Humberto Maier	All
(Brazil) Yamaha AD78 FIMLA by MS Racing	Yamaha	YZF-R3	62	(Brazil) Kevin Fontainha	All
(Italy) PATA AG Motorsport Italia WSSP300	Yamaha	YZF-R3	91	(Italy) Matteo Vannucci	All

Key
Regular rider
Wildcard rider
Replacement rider

== Championship standings ==
=== Points ===
Position	**1st**	**2nd**	**3rd**	**4th**	**5th**	**6th**	**7th**	**8th**	**9th**	**10th**	**11th**	**12th**	**13th**	**14th**	**15th**
Points	25	20	16	13	11	10	9	8	7	6	5	4	3	2	1

=== Riders' championship ===
Pos.	Rider	Bike	POR (Portugal)		ASS (Netherlands)		MOS (Czech Republic)		MIS (Emilia-Romagna)		MAG (France)		ARA (Spain)		EST (Portugal)		JER (Spain)		Pts.
Pos.	Rider	Bike	R1	R2	R1	R2	R1	R2	R1	R2	R1	R2	R1	R2	R1	R2	R1	R2	Pts.
1	(Spain) Beñat Fernández	Kove	**4**	1	5	**5**	3	2	4	1	11	5	3	10	4	**2**	15	1	231
2	(Australia) Carter Thompson	Kawasaki	6	4	6	6	11	7	1	**5**	3	3	1	Ret	2	1	8	**6**	213
3	(Spain) David Salvador	Kawasaki	Ret	**5**	4	2	2	**4**	5	3	6	1	2	Ret	5	4	2	16	203
4	(Italy) Matteo Vannucci	Yamaha	7	11	8	8	5	11	16	17	2	**2**	**4**	1	**1**	6	**1**	9	191
5	(Netherlands) Jeffrey Buis	KTM	1	Ret	1	1	23	1	8	10	5	Ret	10	Ret	11	7	6	5	166
6	(Spain) Julio García González	Kawasaki	2	2	**3**	11	1	5	3	2			13	Ret	12	Ret	DNS	DNS	140
7	(Spain) Antonio Torres Domínguez	Kawasaki	3	3	Ret	9	7	6	**7**	4	15	12	17	8	6	5	4	4	140
8	(Brazil) Humberto Maier	Yamaha	5	Ret	2	7	**4**	3	15	6	12	8	12	3	9	11	10	7	139
9	(Spain) Daniel Mogeda	Kawasaki			7	3	Ret	Ret	13	12	9	4	8	4	8	3	3	2	133
10	(Spain) José Manuel Osuna Saez	Kawasaki	17	9	9	16	9	9	6	8	8	9	Ret	6	14	8	5	Ret	92
11	(Netherlands) Loris Veneman	Kawasaki									**1**	14	6	2	3	22	21	3	89
12	(Italy) Marco Gaggi	Yamaha	Ret	DNS	16	4	8	8	2	7	13	11	Ret	17	16	12	17	15	71
13	(Spain) Juan Risueño	Yamaha	16	13	19	13	Ret	24	14	9	14	6	5	**Ret**	7	9	7	Ret	63
14	(Austria) Jakob Rosenthaler	KTM					Ret	12	11	11	10	NC	11	5	13	10	9	8	60
15	(Indonesia) Felix Putra Mulya	Yamaha	9	7	12	18	12	19	10	DNS	Ret	18	19	7	Ret	13	11	Ret	47
16	(Italy) Mirko Gennai	Kawasaki	Ret	Ret	10	Ret	13	15	9	Ret	7	7							35
17	(Germany) Phillip Tonn	KTM	8	6							4	Ret	Ret	27	22	14	18	19	33
18	(Brazil) Kevin Fontainha	Yamaha	11	12	11	12	14	10	12	18	26	Ret	16	15	18	15	DNS	Ret	32
19	(Spain) Roberto Fernández	Kawasaki	18	17	18	Ret	19	16	17	13	17	10	7	Ret	10	Ret	19	10	30
20	(Italy) Elia Bartolini	Yamaha	15	8	14	15	6	Ret	22	16	25	20	21	19	15	19	12	17	27
21	(Spain) Unai Calatayud	Yamaha	Ret	DNS			22	13	30	Ret	23	13	9	9	Ret	21	13	13	26
22	(Italy) Kevin Sabatucci	Kawasaki	13	14	13	10	15	14	20	14	16	17	18	16	24	28	20	24	19
23	(Portugal) Tomás Alonso	Kawasaki	10	10	17	Ret	24	25	24	Ret	27	25	22	23	19	16	WD	WD	12
24	(Czech Republic) Petr Svoboda	Kawasaki	14	15	Ret	17	10	Ret	26	19									9
25	(Italy) Gianmaria Ibidi	Yamaha					16	Ret	21	Ret	19	15	Ret	11	20	20	26	14	8
26	(Spain) Gonzalo Sánchez	Yamaha	DNS	DNS			20	21	23	Ret	20	16	20	18	21	29	14	11	7
27	(Spain) Marc Vich Gil	Yamaha	20	DNS	20	20	25	17	18	15	21	19	25	12	17	18	DNS	18	5
28	(Indonesia) Arai Agaska	Yamaha									28	23					16	12	4
29	(Indonesia) Faerozi Toreqottullah	Yamaha	12	Ret	Ret	DNS	21	20	25	Ret									4
30	(Italy) Emiliano Ercolani	Kawasaki	Ret	Ret	Ret	14	DNS	DNS			22	24	14	Ret	23	17	Ret	DNS	4
31	(Spain) Ivan Muñoz	Kawasaki							32	21	24	DNS	23	13	25	24	25	DNS	3
32	(Spain) Daniel Ocete	Kawasaki							29	Ret	18	21	15	14			DNS	DNS	3
33	(Italy) Alessandro Di Persio	Yamaha			15	Ret													1
34	(Italy) Emanuele Cazzaniga	Yamaha	21	16	22	19	17	18	19	DNS	29	22	27	24					0
35	(Australia) Cameron Swain	Yamaha	19	18	21	23													0
36	(Czech Republic) Filip Novotny	Kawasaki	Ret	Ret	Ret	Ret	18	Ret	Ret	20									0
37	(Spain) Uriel Hidalgo	Kawasaki	22	19	Ret	22	DNS	DNS					28	25	26	26	DNS	21	0
38	(Italy) Giacomo Zannini	Kawasaki	23	20	24	Ret	27	23	31	Ret	31	26	26	21	Ret	25	22	20	0
39	(Indonesia) Decksa Alfarezel	Yamaha											29	20	Ret	23			0
40	(Germany) Valentin Folger	Yamaha			23	21													0
41	(Colombia) Tomás Marín	Kawasaki											24	22					0
42	(Czech Republic) Daniel Tureček	Kawasaki					26	22											0
43	(Spain) Pablo Olivares	Kawasaki							28	22									0
44	(Czech Republic) Troy Sovicka	Kawasaki									30	27	30	26	27	27	23	22	0
45	(China) Shuncheng Zhang	Yamaha													DNQ	DNQ	24	23	0
46	(Thailand) Krittapat Keankum	Yamaha							27	Ret									0
47	(France) Roméo Moneyron	Kawasaki									Ret	28							0
48	(France) Pierre Perinard	Kawasaki									32	29							0
	(Hungary) Lukács Hamilton	Yamaha													DNQ	DNQ	DNQ	DNQ	
	(Portugal) Martim Garcia	Kawasaki													DNQ	DNQ			

Colour	Result
Gold	Winner
Silver	Second place
Bronze	Third place
Green	Points classification
Blue	Non-points classification
Blue	Non-classified finish (NC)
Purple	Retired, not classified (Ret)
Red	Did not qualify (DNQ)
Red	Did not pre-qualify (DNPQ)
Black	Disqualified (DSQ)
White	Did not start (DNS)
White	Withdrew (WD)
White	Race cancelled (C)
Blank	Did not practice (DNP)
Blank	Did not arrive (DNA)
Blank	Excluded (EX)

**Bold** – Pole position
Italics – Fastest lap

=== Teams' championship ===
Pos.	Teams	Bike No.	POR (Portugal)		ASS (Netherlands)		MOS (Czech Republic)		MIS (Emilia-Romagna)		MAG (France)		ARA (Spain)		EST (Portugal)		JER (Spain)		Pts.
Pos.	Teams	Bike No.	R1	R2	R1	R2	R1	R2	R1	R2	R1	R2	R1	R2	R1	R2	R1	R2	Pts.
1	(Italy) Team ProDina XCI	38	Ret	**5**	4	2	2	**4**	5	3	6	1	2	Ret	5	4	2	16	343
1	(Italy) Team ProDina XCI	47/74	3	3	Ret	9	7	6	**7**	4	15	12	17	8	6	5	4	4	343
2	(Belgium) MTM Kawasaki	26	Ret	Ret	10	Ret	13	15	9	Ret									319
2	(Belgium) MTM Kawasaki	50	6	4	6	6	11	7	1	**5**	3	3	1	Ret	2	1	8	**6**	319
2	(Belgium) MTM Kawasaki	71									**1**	14	6	2	3	22	21	3	319
3	(Germany) Freudenberg KTM-Paligo Racing	6	1	Ret	1	1	23	1	8	10	5	Ret	10	Ret	11	7	6	5	251
3	(Germany) Freudenberg KTM-Paligo Racing	66	8	6							4	Ret	Ret	27	22	14	18	19	251
3	(Germany) Freudenberg KTM-Paligo Racing	78					Ret	12	11	11	10	NC	11	5	13	10	9	8	251
4	(Republic of Ireland) Team#109 Retro Traffic Kove	7	**4**	1	5	**5**	3	2	4	1	11	5	3	10	4	**2**	15	1	231
5	(Italy) PATA AG Motorsport Italia WorldSSP300	91	7	11	8	8	5	11	16	17	2	**2**	**4**	1	**1**	6	**1**	9	191
6	(Brazil) Yamaha AD78 FIMLA by MS Racing	12	5	Ret	2	7	**4**	3	15	6	12	8	12	3	9	11	10	7	171
6	(Brazil) Yamaha AD78 FIMLA by MS Racing	62	11	12	11	12	14	10	12	18	26	Ret	16	15	18	15	DNS	Ret	171
7	(Italy) ProDina Kawasaki Racing Sport	26									7	7							158
7	(Italy) ProDina Kawasaki Racing Sport	48	2	2	**3**	11	1	5	3	2			13	Ret	12	Ret	DNS	DNS	158
8	(Spain) Pons Motorsport Italika Racing	25							29	Ret	18	21	15	14			DNS	DNS	148
8	(Spain) Pons Motorsport Italika Racing	79	10	10	17	Ret	24	25	24	Ret	27	25	22	23	19	16	WD	WD	148
8	(Spain) Pons Motorsport Italika Racing	88			7	3	Ret	Ret	13	12	9	4	8	4	8	3	3	2	148
9	(Italy) Team BrCorse	23	15	8	14	15	6	Ret	22	16	25	20	21	19	15	19	12	17	98
9	(Italy) Team BrCorse	43	Ret	DNS	16	4	8	8	2	7	13	11	Ret	17	16	12	17	15	98
10	(Spain) ZAPPAS-Deza-Box 77 Racing Team	16	22	19	Ret	22	DNS	DNS					28	25	26	26	DNS	21	92
10	(Spain) ZAPPAS-Deza-Box 77 Racing Team	29							31	Ret									92
10	(Spain) ZAPPAS-Deza-Box 77 Racing Team	37											24	22					92
10	(Spain) ZAPPAS-Deza-Box 77 Racing Team	75									32	29							92
10	(Spain) ZAPPAS-Deza-Box 77 Racing Team	77	17	9	9	16	9	9	6	8	8	9	Ret	6	14	8	5	Ret	92
11	(Spain) MS Racing	39	16	13	19	13	Ret	24	14	9	14	6	5	**Ret**	7	9	7	Ret	63
12	(Indonesia) ProGP NitiRacing	19											29	20	Ret	23			55
12	(Indonesia) ProGP NitiRacing	27	9	7	12	18	12	19	10	DNS	Ret	18	19	7	Ret	13	11	Ret	55
12	(Indonesia) ProGP NitiRacing	36	11	Ret	Ret	DNS	21	20	25	Ret									55
12	(Indonesia) ProGP NitiRacing	93									28	23					16	12	55
13	(Belgium) Kawasaki Junior Team by MTM	13	18	17	18	Ret	19	16	17	13	17	10	7	Ret	10	Ret	19	10	39
13	(Belgium) Kawasaki Junior Team by MTM	29									31	26	26	21	Ret	25	22	20	39
13	(Belgium) Kawasaki Junior Team by MTM	53	14	15	Ret	17	10	Ret	26	19									39
14	(Spain) ARCO SASH MotoR University Team	32							27	Ret									34
14	(Spain) ARCO SASH MotoR University Team	33	DNS	DNS			20	21	23	Ret	20	16	20	18	21	29	14	11	34
14	(Spain) ARCO SASH MotoR University Team	40													DNQ	DNQ	24	23	34
14	(Spain) ARCO SASH MotoR University Team	55	Ret	DNS			22	13	30	Ret	23	13	9	9	Ret	21	13	13	34
14	(Spain) ARCO SASH MotoR University Team	58			23	21													34
14	(Spain) ARCO SASH MotoR University Team	69			15	Ret													34
15	(Czech Republic) Accolade Funds Smrž Racing BGR	11	Ret	Ret	Ret	Ret	18	Ret	Ret	20									19
15	(Czech Republic) Accolade Funds Smrž Racing BGR	21									30	27	30	26	27	27	23	22	19
15	(Czech Republic) Accolade Funds Smrž Racing BGR	85	13	14	13	10	15	14	20	14	16	17	18	16	24	28	20	24	19
16	(Italy) Yamaha Motoxracing WorldSSP300 Team	61					16	Ret	21	Ret	19	15	Ret	11	20	20	26	14	13
16	(Italy) Yamaha Motoxracing WorldSSP300 Team	87	19	18	21	23													13
16	(Italy) Yamaha Motoxracing WorldSSP300 Team	96	20	DNS	20	20	25	17	18	15	21	19	25	12	17	18	DNS	18	13
17	(Italy) Kawasaki GP Project	8							32	21	24	DNS	23	13	25	24	25	DNS	7
17	(Italy) Kawasaki GP Project	9	Ret	Ret	Ret	14	DNS	DNS			22	24	14	Ret	23	17	Ret	DNS	7
17	(Italy) Kawasaki GP Project	18							28	22									7
17	(Italy) Kawasaki GP Project	29	23	20	24	Ret	27	23											7
	(Italy) Racestar Trasimeno	4	21	16	22	19	17	18	19	DNS	29	22	27	24					0
	(Italy) Racestar Trasimeno	15													DNQ	DNQ	DNQ	DNQ	0
	(Czech Republic) Rohac & Fejta Motoracing Team	86					26	22											0
	(Portugal) Marcos Car Racing Team	68													DNQ	DNQ			

=== Manufacturers' championship ===
Pos.	Manufacturer	POR (Portugal)		ASS (Netherlands)		MOS (Czech Republic)		MIS (Emilia-Romagna)		MAG (France)		ARA (Spain)		EST (Portugal)		JER (Spain)		Pts.
Pos.	Manufacturer	R1	R2	R1	R2	R1	R2	R1	R2	R1	R2	R1	R2	R1	R2	R1	R2	Pts.
1	(Japan) Kawasaki	2	2	3	2	1	4	1	2	1	1	1	2	2	1	2	2	339
2	(Japan) Yamaha	5	7	2	4	4	3	2	6	2	2	4	1	1	6	1	7	259
3	(China) Kove	4	1	5	5	3	2	4	1	11	5	3	10	4	2	15	1	231
4	(Austria) KTM	1	6	1	1	23	1	8	10	4	NC	10	5	11	7	6	5	189
