= Supersport 300 World Championship =

International motorcycle racing

FIM Supersport 300 World Championship
- Category: Motorcycle racing
- Region: Europe
- Inaugural season: 2017
- Folded: 2025
- Constructors: Kawasaki, Kove, KTM, Yamaha
- Tyre suppliers: Pirelli
- Last Riders' champion: Beñat Fernández
- Last Makes' champion: Kawasaki
- Last Teams' champion: Team ProDina XCI
- Official website: worldsbk.com

The Supersport 300 World Championship (or short abbreviated as WorldSSP300) was a motorcycle racing competition on paved surfaces, for production-based motorcycles. Created in 2017, the championship ran as a support class to the Superbike World Championship until 2025, when the series was folded and replaced by the new 2026 Sportbike World Championship.

== History ==
The Supersport 300 World Championship was born in 2017 as a replacement for the European Junior Cup and European Superstock 600 Championship category that worked as a hotbed of the future stars of Superbike until 2016, this new championship has world-class status by the FIM. Like its predecessor, the championship runs alongside the World Superbike Championship and the Supersport World Championship but only in European rounds.

The objective of this category is to create a ladder to Superbike in an accessible way and with a mechanical equality that allows all the drivers to have the same winning options. The championship began on 2 April 2017 at MotorLand Aragón, in a race that had 37 drivers who crowned Scott Deroue as the first driver to win a race in category 3. Spaniard Marc García was the first Supersport 300 world champion to overcome the Italian Alfonso Coppola by one point.

On 30 September 2018, Ana Carrasco, who had been a year earlier the first woman to win a world championship race organized by FIM, became the first female champion of the world in the history of motorcycle racing.

On 2019 season, in order to face the big entry list (caused by the success of previous edition), FIM split Practice and Qualifying into 2 groups with best 30 riders racing on Sunday. The series has been noted for its close competition, which has been criticised as dangerous due to the risk of riders striking each other in the event of falls.

== Regulations ==
According to the regulation approved by the International Motorcycling Federation, drivers must be at least fifteen years of age to participate. Despite being a world championship, it never ran outside Europe at the moment.

The bikes allowed to run in this category are not exclusively 300 engine capacity, which is why the minimum weight and revolutions per minute vary for each motorcycle model.

Starting from the Aragon GP 2018 the limits imposed by the FIM are the following:

- KTM RC 390 R, single cylinder, minimum weight 136 kg, limit revolutions per minute 10.450 RPM
- Yamaha YZF-R3, twin-cylinder, minimum weight 140 kg, limit revolutions per minute 13,300 RPM
- Kawasaki Ninja 400, twin cylinder, minimum weight 150 kg, limit revolutions per minute 10,350 RPM
- Honda CBR500R, twin cylinder, minimum weight 143 kg, limit revolutions per minute 11,200 RPM

== Champions ==
=== Riders' championship ===
Season	Rider	Pts	Bike	Team
2017	(Spain) Marc García	139	Yamaha YZF-R3	Halcourier Racing
2018	(Spain) Ana Carrasco	93	Kawasaki Ninja 400	DS Junior Team
2019	(Spain) Manuel González	161	Kawasaki Ninja 400	Kawasaki ParkinGO Team
2020	(Netherlands) Jeffrey Buis	221	Kawasaki Ninja 400	MTM Kawasaki Motoport
2021	(Spain) Adrián Huertas	255	Kawasaki Ninja 400	MTM Kawasaki
2022	(Spain) Álvaro Díaz	239	Yamaha YZF-R3	Arco Motor University Team
2023	(Netherlands) Jeffrey Buis	207	Kawasaki Ninja 400	MTM Kawasaki
2024	(Indonesia) Aldi Satya Mahendra	221	Yamaha YZF-R3	Team BrCorse
2025	(Spain) Beñat Fernández	231	Kove 321 RR-S	Team#109 Retro Traffic Kove

=== By rider nationality ===
Riders in bold were entered in the 2025 World Championship.

Country	Titles	Champions	Season(s)	By rider (titles)
Spain	6	6	2017–2019, 2021–2022	Marc García (1)
Spain	6	6	2017–2019, 2021–2022	Ana Carrasco (1)
Spain	6	6	2017–2019, 2021–2022	Manuel González (1)
Spain	6	6	2017–2019, 2021–2022	Adrián Huertas (1)
Spain	6	6	2017–2019, 2021–2022	Álvaro Díaz (1)
Spain	6	6	2017–2019, 2021–2022	**Beñat Fernández** (1)
(Netherlands) Netherland	2	1	2020, 2023	**Jeffrey Buis** (2)
Indonesia	1	1	2024	Aldi Satya Mahendra (1)

=== Manufacturers' championship ===
Season	Manufacturer	Pts	Bike
2017	(Japan) Yamaha	196	Yamaha YZF-R3
2018	(Japan) Kawasaki	176	Kawasaki Ninja 400
2019	(Japan) Kawasaki	216	Kawasaki Ninja 400
2020	(Japan) Kawasaki	335	Kawasaki Ninja 400
2021	(Japan) Kawasaki	381	Kawasaki Ninja 400
2022	(Japan) Yamaha	344	Yamaha YZF-R3
2023	(Japan) Kawasaki	342	Kawasaki Ninja 400
2024	(Japan) Kawasaki	332	Kawasaki Ninja 400
2025	(Japan) Kawasaki	339	Kawasaki Ninja 400

== See also ==
- Supersport World Championship
