= Taz Taylor =

Taz Taylor may refer to:

- Taz Taylor (motorcyclist) (born 1998), British motorcycle racer
- Taz Taylor (record producer) (born 1992), American record producer
