= Harun Çabuk =

Turkish motorcycle racer (born 1997)

- Nationality: Turkish
- Born: 1997 (age 28–29); Denizli, Turkey
- Current team: Kawasaki Puccetti Racing
- Bike number: 54
Motorcycle racing career statistics
Supersport 300 World Championship
Active years	2017
Manufacturers	Kawasaki
Championships	0
2017 championship position	22nd (15 pts)
Starts / Wins / Podiums / Poles / F. laps / Points; 6 / 0 / 0 / 0 / 0 / 15

Harun Çabuk (born 1997) is a Turkish motorcycle racer. He competes for Kawasaki Puccetti Racing team on a Kawasaki Ninja 300.

== Private life ==
Harun Çabuk was born into a motorcycle-related family in Denizli, western Turkey in 1997. His father Yaşar Çabuk is a motorcycle mechanic and her mother Gülay is a motorcycle racing referee.

At the age of 2–3 years, he used to spend his time at his father's motorcycle repair shop. At the age of 5–6 years, he started to ride small motorcycles.

== Sports career ==
Çabuk began to race when he received his own motorcycle, and won many trophies and medals at local and nationwide events already at very young age. He won four Turkish champion titles in motorcycle racing and motocross. Following his success, five-time world-champion retired Turkish motorcycle racer Kenan Sofuoğlu took him in his team.

Çabuk debuted internationally in 2012 at the first round of the Supermoto Junior and S3 European Championships at Pleven, Bulgaria, and became champion. He completed the 2015 European Junior Cup at tenth place. He placed third at the 2016 European Junior Cup finishing three of the season's total eight rounds as winner. The 2017 Supersport 300 World Championship ended for him at 22nd rank.

== Career statistics ==
=== Career highlights ===
- 2015 - 10th, European Junior Cup, Honda CBR500R
- 2016 - 3rd, European Junior Cup, Honda CBR650F

=== European Junior Cup ===
Year	1	2	3	4	5	6	7	8	Pos.	Pts
2015	ARA (Spain); Ret	ASS (Netherlands); 16	IMO (Italy); 9	DON (United Kingdom); 11	POR (Portugal); 9	MIS (Italy); 7	JER (Spain); 6	MAG (France); 8	10	46
2016	ARA (Spain); 1	ASS (Netherlands); Ret	DON (United Kingdom); Ret	MIS (Italy)	LAU (Germany); 1	MAG (France); 5	JER (Spain); 4	JER (Spain); 1	3	99

Colour	Result
Gold	Winner
Silver	Second place
Bronze	Third place
Green	Points classification
Blue	Non-points classification
Blue	Non-classified finish (NC)
Purple	Retired, not classified (Ret)
Red	Did not qualify (DNQ)
Red	Did not pre-qualify (DNPQ)
Black	Disqualified (DSQ)
White	Did not start (DNS)
White	Withdrew (WD)
White	Race cancelled (C)
Blank	Did not practice (DNP)
Blank	Did not arrive (DNA)
Blank	Excluded (EX)

**Bold** – Pole position
Italics – Fastest lap

=== Supersport 300 World Championship ===
Year	Bike	1	2	3	4	5	6	7	8	9	Pos.	Pts
2017	Kawasaki	ARA (Spain); 14	ASS (Netherlands); 8	IMO (Italy); DNS	DON (United Kingdom)	MIS (Italy)	LAU (Germany); 17	POR (Portugal); 11	MAG (France); 18	JER (Spain); 20	22	15
