= Avalon Lewis =

New Zealand motorcycle racer

- Nationality: New Zealander
- Born: 21 September 1992 (age 34); North Shore, Auckland, New Zealand
- Current team: Carl Cox Motor Sports
- Bike number: 21
Motorcycle racing career statistics
Supersport 300 World Championship
Active years	2017
Manufacturers	Kawasaki
Championships	0
2017 championship position	NC (0 pts)
Starts / Wins / Podiums / Poles / F. laps / Points; 6 / 0 / 0 / 0 / 0 / 0
Women's Circuit Racing World Championship
Active years	2024 -
2026 championship position	31st (0 pts)
Starts / Wins / Podiums / Poles / F. laps / Points; 16 / 0 / 0 / 0 / 0 / 101

Avalon Lewis (née Biddle; born 21 September 1992, in North Shore, Auckland) is a New Zealand motorcycle racer.

== Background ==
Lewis' parents are Keith and Beverley Biddle. Her father was a speedway bike racer and her uncle Bruce Biddle a Commonwealth Games and Olympic cyclist who been placed third in the 1972 Munich Games road race. She attended Pinehurst School, Albany, Auckland where she did well academically and Massey University where she studied for a Sports Science degree. In February 2017, she was awarded the AIMES Judges special award of $15,000 in recognition of her achievements in motor-cycle racing. The award's purpose is to provide financial assistance to young high achievers to further their chosen careers.

In 2016 when she was not away racing, she worked at Hyosung Motorcycles in Barry's Point Rd, Whangaparoa. Biddle is co-presenter of the Sky Sport TV show Skyspeed and writes for Bike Rider Magazine. She is involved in marketing, promotional work, and road safety.

== Racing career ==
=== Early career ===
Lewis began racing a Yamaha PW50 in mini-motocross when she was six with the North Harbour Mini Motocross Club. When she was 13 she started road racing buckets (Bucket racing is defined as Formula 4 and Formula 5 Miniature Road Racing and Sidecars) with the Auckland Motorcycle Club. She was awarded the 2006 The most promising newcomer during this phase of her career, having come second in the Auckland Miniature road race series and second Miniature road race New Zealand Grand prix. In 2006 she finished fourth on points in the Formula 5 class riding a RG XL100 and third on points in 2007 together with a seventeenth in B grade in 2006 followed the next year by a second riding either the RG-XL100 or a Honda CB125T. The 2007-2008 year was not so successful with her attaining 24th place in Formula 4 with points from only two races and an 11th place in Formula 5 with points from only two races. It is unclear from the records if she raced in any of the other races as she was focusing on 150 street stock class by that time.

=== Local racing ===
Lewis moved on from this after purchasing a second hand dirty Suzuki RG150 for NZ$800 to compete in the New Zealand national 150 street stock class coming first in the Taupo Road Race Spectacular. In 2007 she was first in the RD 1 NZ championships streetstock class, first Victoria Motorcycle Club winter series streetstock class, first Victoria motorcycle club winter series junior class, second Taupo Road Race spectacular on a 125GP, third Rd 2 NZ championships streetstock class, fifth Australian Road Race Development Association series. She also was awarded Most outstanding rider of the meeting award 2007 Rd 1 NZ championships, Best Newcomer South Island Sportz Fotoz Junior Cup, Auckland Motorcycle Club most promising newcomer, and Victoria motorcycle club rookie of the year.

Lewis continued racing in the 125GP class in 2008 coming first Pacific Motorcycle club summer series 125gp, first Brother Taupo Road Race spectacular 125gp, second Auckland motorcycle club series 125gp, and second Rd 5 Australian motorcycle development association Phillip Island 125gp. She was nominated as the Nominated Most Promising Newcomer at Motorcycling New Zealand awards dinner. Her successes continued in 2009 coming first New Zealand Grand Prix 125gp, first Rd 3 Castrol Power 1 N.Z. Superbike Championships 125gp, second Rd 1 Castrol Power 1 N.Z. Superbike Championships 125gp, second Rd 4 Castrol Power 1 N.Z. Superbike Championships 125gp, second Victoria Motorcycle Club Actrix Winter series 125gp, second New Zealand Formula 5 Grand Prix Taupo F5 buckets, fourth overall Castrol Power 1 NZ superbike championships 125gp. She had been in second place overall but crashed, breaking her leg, at Pukekohe. She had also set a new lap record at Mansfield Raceway, Fielding for a 125GP with a 1-minute 13.6 lap.

Lewis was invited to race on a Suzuki RGB500 in the Mike Pero Southern Classic at Timaru. Following this in 2019, she competed in the New Zealand Supersport 600 series, winning the championship on a MTF Finance sponsored Kawasaki Ninja ZX-6R it and becoming the first female to do so. Following this, she was invited to join the Gold Coast-based Cube Racing team and race in Australia. She competed again in the 2020 New Zealand Supersport 600 series finishing third overall.

In 2021, Lewis was invited to race a Subaru in the Otago Rally.

=== International racing ===
In 2009 , Lewis headed to Europe to participate in the selection process based at the Adria International Raceway in Italy for the 2010 Red Bull MotoGP Rookies Cup competition. The year 2010 saw her coming first in the Australasian Formula Extreme Championships 125gp stock class, and second overall in the Castrol Power 1 NZ Superbike championships 125gp, New Zealand Tourist Trophy title 125gp and the round 5 of the Castrol Power 1 NZ Superbike Championships 125gp. She also came first in the New Zealand Formula 5 Grand Prix.

Having come second overall in the 2011 Castrol Power 1 NZ superbike championships 125gp, Lewis was able to compete with a wild car entry in the 2011 Australian motorcycle Grand Prix 125 class. During qualifying her bike had engine issues which meant she did not start. She win the New Zealand Tourist Trophy Title 125gp and came ninth in the Asia Road Race cup at Sugo, Japan that year.

Lewis moved up to the NZ Formula 2 600cc competition in 2012. That same year she came second overall in the Italian Women's Championship on a Honda CBR600RR and spent the following two years racing in Italy, including racing in the 2012 and 2013 Honda Trophy races. Her placing in 2013 while racing for New Zealand-owned Wil Sport Management team included two third places, one in round 1 Mastercup 600 Stock at Mugello Italy and the other at round 4 Trofeo Amatori Pro K class 600cc Misano Italy. She had also been honoured in the 2012 New Zealand Motor Cycle Awards as the Outstanding Female Contribution to the sport. She came ninth in the 2013 New Zealand Supersport 600 championships.

In 2014, Lewis was part of the Moto3 Development Project riding a development bike and NZ Motorcycle Awards Female rider of the year. She received the award again in 2016. Returning to New Zealand, she came 10th in the 2014 NZ 600 supersport championships.

In 2015, Lewis won the New Zealand Superlite (450cc) championship, followed by the 2015 & 2016 the European Junior Cup European Women's Cup at World Superbike events riding for Sourzfoodz Benjan Motorsport. Also in 2015 she was asked to race for Moriwaki at the Suzuka Endurance event. She was partnered with Shelina Moreda (USA) and they came 19th overall in the four hour endurance race. She was also one of the nominees for New Zealand sportwoman of the year at the 2015 Halberg Awards and again in 2019.

In a 2016 interview with the Sunday News, Lewis described her racing career as being funded by her mums world famous chocolate chip cookies. She also related a tale of a German racer whom she had been trying to beat for second place in a race at Mansfield as blurting out "f... its a girl" when she took of her helmet at the end of the race. She also talked about how expensive it was to in Europe where you had to fund your own bike, travel, and accommodation. Her bike, in 2012, cost NZ$95,000 although she had sponsorship from Phil and Cheryl London of Wil Sport.

In 2017, Lewis competed in the Supersport 300 World Championship aboard a Kawasaki Ninja 300 for Benjam Kawasaki. She came fifth in the New Zealand Supersport 600cc Championship and third in the Assen IDM Supersport 300. The following year, she came third in the New Zealand Supersport 600cc Championship and was the first woman to win a 600cc National Championship race in New Zealand at Round 4 NZSBK in Taupo.

In 2024, Lewis competed at Cremona as a wildcard in the inaugural FIM Women's Circuit Racing World Championship. In 2025 she was entered for the full season of World WCF for Carl Cox Motor Sports.

== Career statistics ==
=== Career highlights ===
- 2015 - 23rd, European Junior Cup, Honda CBR500R
- 2015 - 1st, Women's European Cup
- 2015 - 1st, New Zealand Superlites
- 2016 - 16th, European Junior Cup, Honda CBR650F
- 2016 - 1st, Women's European Cup
- 2019 - 1st, NZ Supersport 600

=== Grand Prix motorcycle racing results ===
==== By season ====
Season	Class	Motorcycle	Team	Number	Race	Win	Podium	Pole	FLap	Pts	Plcd
2011	125cc	Honda	Avalon Biddle Racing	49	0	0	0	0	0	0	NC
Total					**0**	**0**	**0**	**0**	**0**	**0**	

==== Races by year ====
(key)

Yr	Class	Bike	1	2	3	4	5	6	7	8	9	10	11	12	13	14	15	16	17	Pos	Pts
2011	125cc	Honda	QAT	SPA	POR	FRA	CAT	GBR	NED	ITA	GER	CZE	INP	RSM	ARA	JPN	AUS; DNQ	MAL	VAL	NC	0

=== Supersport 300 World Championship ===
==== Races by year ====
(key)

Year	Bike	1	2	3	4	5	6	7	8	9	Pos	Pts
2017	Kawasaki	SPA; Ret	NED; 19	ITA; 29	GBR; 26	ITA; 26	GER; Ret	POR	FRA	SPA	NC	0

=== Women's Motorcycling World Championship ===
==== Races by year ====
(key) (Races in bold indicate pole position; races in italics indicate fastest lap)

Year	Team	Bike	1	2	3	4	5	6	7	8	9	10	11	12	Pos	Pts
2024	Carl Cox Motor Sports	Yamaha YZF-R7	MIS1	MIS2	DON1	DON2	ALG1	ALG2	CRE1; 8	CRE2; 5	EST1	EST2	JER1	JER2	20th	19
2025	Carl Cox Motor Sports	Yamaha YZF-R7	ASS1; 4	ASS2; Ret	CRE1; 6	CRE2; 5	DON1; 9	DON2; Ret	BAL1; 8	BAL2; 7	MAG1; 11	MAG2; 7	JER1; 11	JER2; 11	8th	82
2026	Carl Cox Motor Sports	Yamaha YZF-R7	ALG1	ALG2	ASS1	ASS2	BAL1	BAL2	MIS1	MIS2	DON1	DON2	JER1; 16	JER2; 17	31st	0
