= 2018 Supersport 300 World Championship =

2018 Supersport 300 World Championship
Previous:	2017	Next:	2019
Support series: Superbike World Championship; Supersport World Championship; European Superstock 1000 Championship

The 2018 Supersport 300 World Championship was the second season of the Supersport 300 World Championship of motorcycle racing.

The season was won by Ana Carrasco who became the first female rider in history to win a World Championship in solo motorcycle road racing.

== Race calendar and results ==
2018 calendar
Rnd	Country	Circuit	Date	Superpole	Fastest lap	Winning rider	Winning team
1	Spain	MotorLand Aragón	15 April	(Spain) Mika Pérez	(Netherlands) Koen Meuffels	(Netherlands) Koen Meuffels	KTM Fortron Junior Team
2	Netherlands	TT Circuit Assen	22 April	(Spain) Mika Pérez	(Spain) Ana Carrasco	(Germany) Luca Grünwald	Freudenberg KTM WorldSSP Team
3	Italy	Autodromo Enzo e Dino Ferrari	13 May	(Spain) Ana Carrasco	(Spain) María Herrera	(Spain) Ana Carrasco	DS Junior Team
4	United Kingdom	Donington Park	27 May	(Spain) Ana Carrasco	(Spain) Ana Carrasco	(Spain) Ana Carrasco	DS Junior Team
5	Czech Republic	Automotodrom Brno	10 June	(Indonesia) Galang Hendra Pratama	(Indonesia) Imanuel Putra Pratna	(Indonesia) Galang Hendra Pratama	BIBLION YAMAHA MOTOXRACING
6	Italy	Misano World Circuit Marco Simoncelli	8 July	(Indonesia) Galang Hendra Pratama	(Spain) Ana Carrasco	(Italy) Manuel Bastianelli	PRODINA IRCOS Team
7	Portugal	Algarve International Circuit	16 September	(Australia) Tom Edwards	(Spain) Ana Carrasco	(Netherlands) Scott Deroue	Motoport Kawasaki
8	France	Circuit de Nevers Magny-Cours	30 September	(Netherlands) Scott Deroue	(Spain) Mika Pérez	(Spain) Daniel Valle	BCD Yamaha MS Racing

== Entry list ==
2018 entry list
Team	Constructor	Motorcycle	No.	Rider	Rounds
DS Junior Team	Kawasaki	Kawasaki Ninja 400	2	(Spain) Ana Carrasco	All
DS Junior Team	Kawasaki	Kawasaki Ninja 400	20	(South Africa) Dorren Loureiro	All
Motoport Kawasaki	Kawasaki	Kawasaki Ninja 400	3	(Australia) Tom Toparis	5–6
Motoport Kawasaki	Kawasaki	Kawasaki Ninja 400	6	(Netherlands) Robert Schotman	1–3, 7–8
Motoport Kawasaki	Kawasaki	Kawasaki Ninja 400	83	(Australia) Lachlan Epis	4
Motoport Kawasaki	Kawasaki	Kawasaki Ninja 400	95	(Netherlands) Scott Deroue	All
Benro Racing	Yamaha	Yamaha YZF-R3	4	(Netherlands) Milan Merckelbagh	2
KTM Fortron Racing Team	KTM	KTM RC 390 R	5	(Netherlands) Ryan Vos	All
KTM Fortron Racing Team	KTM	KTM RC 390 R	15	(Netherlands) Glenn van Straalen	All
Scuderia Maranga Racing	Honda	Honda CBR500R	7	(Italy) Nicola Settimo	All
Scuderia Maranga Racing	Honda	Honda CBR500R	58	(United Kingdom) Trystan Finocchiaro	All
Kawasaki ParkinGO Team	Kawasaki	Kawasaki Ninja 400	8	(Spain) Mika Pérez	All
Kawasaki ParkinGO Team	Kawasaki	Kawasaki Ninja 400	27	(Italy) Filippo Rovelli	All
Moto Team	Kawasaki	Kawasaki Ninja 400	9	(France) Steffie Naud	8
Miguel Oliveira Racing Team	KTM	KTM RC 390 R	10	(Portugal) Pedro Fragoso	7
MMR	Yamaha	Yamaha YZF-R3	11	(Italy) Kevin Arduini	3
Pertamina Almería BCD by MS Racing	Yamaha	Yamaha YZF-R3	12	(Indonesia) Ali Adriansyah Rusmiputro	All
Racedays	Honda	Honda CBR500R	13	(South Africa) Dino Iozzo	All
GP Project Team	Kawasaki	Kawasaki Ninja 400	14	(France) Enzo de la Vega	All
GP Project Team	Kawasaki	Kawasaki Ninja 400	22	(Ukraine) Nick Kalinin	1–3, 5–8
C.M. Racing A.S.D.	Yamaha	Yamaha YZF-R3	16	(Spain) Marc Luna	1–2
KTM Fortron Junior Team	KTM	KTM RC 390 R	17	(Netherlands) Koen Meuffels	1–6
KTM Fortron Junior Team	KTM	KTM RC 390 R	72	(Netherlands) Victor Steeman	7–8
Team Tóth – YART	Yamaha	Yamaha YZF-R3	18	(United Kingdom) Alex Murley	1–4
Team Tóth – YART	Yamaha	Yamaha YZF-R3	30	(Poland) Daniel Blin	5–8
Team Tóth – YART	Yamaha	Yamaha YZF-R3	64	(France) Hugo De Cancellis	All
Team Trasimeno	Yamaha	Yamaha YZF-R3	19	(Italy) Luca Bernardi	All
Team Trasimeno	Yamaha	Yamaha YZF-R3	39	(Italy) Omar Bonoli	6
Team Trasimeno	Yamaha	Yamaha YZF-R3	61	(Turkey) Bahattin Sofuoğlu	7–8
Team Trasimeno	Yamaha	Yamaha YZF-R3	62	(South Africa) Jared Schultz	6
Team Trasimeno	Yamaha	Yamaha YZF-R3	84	(Netherlands) Joep Overbeeke	1–5
ETG Racing	Kawasaki	Kawasaki Ninja 400	21	(Spain) Borja Sánchez	All
ETG Racing	Kawasaki	Kawasaki Ninja 400	78	(France) Joseph Foray	All
KTM Orange Brigade/JP43 Training	KTM	KTM RC 390 R	23	(Canada) Alex Dumas	8
Samurai–YART Racing; Samurai Racing	Yamaha	Yamaha YZF-R3	25	(France) Andy Verdoïa	4–5, 8
Samurai–YART Racing; Samurai Racing	Yamaha	Yamaha YZF-R3	44	(South Africa) Samuel Lochoff	All
Samurai–YART Racing; Samurai Racing	Yamaha	Yamaha YZF-R3	79	(Portugal) Tomás Alonso	All
GRT Yamaha WorldSSP300 Team	Yamaha	Yamaha YZF-R3	28	(Netherlands) Dennis Koopman	All
GRT Yamaha WorldSSP300 Team	Yamaha	Yamaha YZF-R3	54	(Italy) Filippo Fuligni	All
Polish Talent Team	Yamaha	Yamaha YZF-R3	30	(Poland) Daniel Blin	1–2
JRT Brno Circuit	Yamaha	Yamaha YZF-R3	32	(Czech Republic) Alexandra Pelikánová	5
BCD Yamaha MS Racing	Yamaha	Yamaha YZF-R3	33	(Spain) Daniel Valle	All
BCD Yamaha MS Racing	Yamaha	Yamaha YZF-R3	36	(Spain) Beatriz Neila	1
BCD Yamaha MS Racing	Yamaha	Yamaha YZF-R3	69	(Spain) María Herrera	All
TERRA E MOTO	Yamaha	Yamaha YZF-R3	34	(Australia) Jack Mahaffy	7
TERRA E MOTO	Yamaha	Yamaha YZF-R3	91	(Italy) Giacomo Mora	8
TERRA E MOTO	Yamaha	Yamaha YZF-R3	96	(Indonesia) Imanuel Putra Pratna	1–6
Symcirrus Motorsport	Kawasaki	Kawasaki Ninja 400	35	(United Kingdom) Edmund Best	4
Motoclub Baláž/KPA	Kawasaki	Kawasaki Ninja 400	37	(Slovakia) Roman Kučera	5
Freudenberg KTM Junior Team	KTM	KTM RC 390 R	41	(Germany) Jan-Ole Jähnig	All
Freudenberg KTM WorldSSP Team	KTM	KTM RC 390 R	43	(Germany) Luca Grünwald	All
Freudenberg KTM WorldSSP Team	KTM	KTM RC 390 R	97	(Germany) Maximilian Kappler	All
Kawasaki PALMETO PL Racing	Kawasaki	Kawasaki Ninja 400	47	(Spain) Ferran Hernández Moyano	7
Team Runner Bike	KTM	KTM RC 390 R	48	(Italy) Thomas Brianti	6
PRODINA IRCOS Team	Kawasaki	Kawasaki Ninja 400	51	(Italy) Manuel Bastianelli	3, 6
DEZA-Córdoba-Patrimonio de la Humanidad	Kawasaki	Kawasaki Ninja 400	52	(Spain) Guillem Erill	7
DEZA-Córdoba-Patrimonio de la Humanidad	Kawasaki	Kawasaki Ninja 400	87	(Germany) Alex Börner	7
BIBLION YAMAHA MOTOXRACING	Yamaha	Yamaha YZF-R3	55	(Indonesia) Galang Hendra Pratama	All
BIBLION YAMAHA MOTOXRACING	Yamaha	Yamaha YZF-R3	65	(Italy) Jacopo Facco	6
BIBLION YAMAHA MOTOXRACING	Yamaha	Yamaha YZF-R3	99	(Italy) Paolo Grassia	1–5, 7–8
Team B2G	Kawasaki	Kawasaki Ninja 400	70	(France) Hugo Girardet	8
Nutec – Benjan – Kawasaki	Kawasaki	Kawasaki Ninja 400	71	(Australia) Tom Edwards	All
Nutec – Benjan – Kawasaki	Kawasaki	Kawasaki Ninja 400	93	(Netherlands) Walid Khan	All
Motosport Schwarz Racing Team	Yamaha	Yamaha YZF-R3	73	(Czech Republic) Vojtěch Schwarz	5
Team GoEleven Kawasaki	Kawasaki	Kawasaki Ninja 400	75	(Italy) Manuel Rocca	8
Team XG Racing	Kawasaki	Kawasaki Ninja 400	76	(United Kingdom) Luke Verwey	4
Team XG Racing	Kawasaki	Kawasaki Ninja 400	77	(United Kingdom) Kade Verwey	4
Pertamina Almería BCD Junior Team by MS; BCD Pertamina Junior Team by MS Racing	Yamaha	Yamaha YZF-R3	81	(Spain) Manuel González	All
PROGP Racing	Yamaha	Yamaha YZF-R3	85	(Italy) Kevin Sabatucci	3, 6
Bibi's Racing Team	KTM	KTM RC 390 R	88	(Netherlands) Bibi Damen	2
ARCO–MotoR UPV University Team	Yamaha	Yamaha YZF-R3	89	(Spain) Adrián Carrasco	1

Key
Regular rider
Wildcard rider
Replacement rider

- All entries used Pirelli tyres.

== Championship standings ==
Points were awarded as follows:

Position	**1st**	**2nd**	**3rd**	**4th**	**5th**	**6th**	**7th**	**8th**	**9th**	**10th**	**11th**	**12th**	**13th**	**14th**	**15th**
Points	25	20	16	13	11	10	9	8	7	6	5	4	3	2	1

=== Riders' championship ===
Pos.	Rider	Bike	ARA (Spain)	ASS (Netherlands)	IMO (Italy)	DON (United Kingdom)	BRN (Czech Republic)	MIS (Italy)	POR (Portugal)	MAG (France)	Pts.
1	(Spain) Ana Carrasco	Kawasaki	6	4	**1**	**1**	11	10	10	13	93
2	(Spain) Mika Pérez	Kawasaki	**3**	**Ret**	8	8	DNS	2	2	2	92
3	(Netherlands) Scott Deroue	Kawasaki	2	3	Ret	6	7	Ret	1	**Ret**	80
4	(Germany) Luca Grünwald	KTM	9	1	4	10	10	5	29	6	78
5	(South Africa) Dorren Loureiro	Kawasaki	8	7	11	2	12	9	9	10	66
6	(Spain) Manuel González	Yamaha	Ret	9	Ret	12	33	3	3	3	59
7	(Spain) Borja Sánchez	Kawasaki	10	Ret	2	3	3	Ret	16	16	58
8	(Spain) Daniel Valle	Yamaha	13	11	Ret	11	8	Ret	7	1	55
9	(Netherlands) Glenn van Straalen	KTM	7	2	9	23	5	Ret	Ret	8	55
10	(Indonesia) Galang Hendra Pratama	Yamaha	16	Ret	5	9	**1**	**7**	Ret	15	53
11	(Netherlands) Koen Meuffels	KTM	1	Ret	Ret	5	4	Ret			49
12	(Netherlands) Walid Khan	Kawasaki	11	5	10	Ret	2	Ret	21	11	47
13	(Spain) María Herrera	Yamaha	17	10	7	18	9	6	Ret	4	45
14	(Ukraine) Nick Kalinin	Kawasaki	4	6	Ret		6	Ret	Ret	7	42
15	(France) Enzo de la Vega	Kawasaki	12	18	Ret	4	14	12	5	9	41
16	(Germany) Jan-Ole Jähnig	KTM	Ret	8	6	7	13	8	14	17	40
17	(Italy) Luca Bernardi	Yamaha	DSQ	DSQ	12	14	21	4	Ret	5	30
18	(Italy) Manuel Bastianelli	Kawasaki			Ret			1			25
19	(Netherlands) Robert Schotman	Kawasaki	5	Ret	Ret				4	Ret	24
20	(Italy) Kevin Sabatucci	Yamaha			3			Ret			16
21	(Australia) Tom Edwards	Kawasaki	Ret	Ret	Ret	15	Ret	26	**6**	Ret	11
22	(Spain) Ferran Hernández Moyano	Kawasaki							8		8
23	(Indonesia) Ali Adriansyah Rusmiputro	Yamaha	Ret	13	26	13	NC	Ret	18	20	6
24	(Germany) Alex Börner	Kawasaki							11		5
25	(Indonesia) Imanuel Putra Pratna	Yamaha	Ret	19	17	17	Ret	11			5
26	(France) Andy Verdoïa	Yamaha				Ret	15			12	5
27	(Germany) Maximilian Kappler	KTM	15	12	Ret	16	NC	22	27	30	5
28	(Spain) Guillem Erill	Kawasaki							12		4
29	(Italy) Paolo Grassia	Yamaha	14	Ret	Ret	Ret	25		28	14	4
30	(Australia) Jack Mahaffy	Yamaha							13		3
31	(Italy) Omar Bonoli	Yamaha						13			3
32	(Italy) Filippo Rovelli	Kawasaki	Ret	Ret	13	Ret	20	Ret	20	18	3
33	(Netherlands) Dennis Koopman	Yamaha	20	15	14	19	23	21	33	27	3
34	(France) Hugo De Cancellis	Yamaha	DNS	16	18	21	16	14	22	19	2
35	(Spain) Marc Luna	Yamaha	18	14							2
36	(Netherlands) Victor Steeman	KTM							15	Ret	1
37	(Italy) Jacopo Facco	Yamaha						15			1
38	(South Africa) Dino Iozzo	Honda	21	21	15	20	17	20	23	24	1
	(Portugal) Tomás Alonso	Yamaha	27	23	Ret	26	Ret	16	25	26	0
	(Italy) Kevin Arduini	Yamaha			16						0
	(Turkey) Bahattin Sofuoğlu	Yamaha							17	DNS	0
	(Italy) Filippo Fuligni	Yamaha	NC	28	19	Ret	22	17	19	Ret	0
	(United Kingdom) Alex Murley	Yamaha	23	17	Ret	Ret					0
	(South Africa) Samuel Lochoff	Yamaha	28	24	25	22	27	18	24	Ret	0
	(Poland) Daniel Blin	Yamaha	25	Ret			18	Ret	26	Ret	0
	(Australia) Tom Toparis	Kawasaki					19	19			0
	(France) Joseph Foray	Kawasaki	19	26	20	24	26	24	31	23	0
	(Netherlands) Joep Overbeeke	Yamaha	24	20	22	Ret	WD				0
	(Italy) Giacomo Mora	Yamaha								21	0
	(Netherlands) Ryan Vos	KTM	Ret	Ret	21	Ret	24	23	34	29	0
	(Italy) Manuel Rocca	Kawasaki								22	0
	(Netherlands) Milan Merckelbagh	Yamaha		22							0
	(Spain) Beatriz Neila	Yamaha	22								0
	(Italy) Nicola Settimo	Honda	29	27	23	25	30	25	30	28	0
	(United Kingdom) Trystan Finocchiaro	Honda	Ret	25	24	27	29	27	32	32	0
	(Canada) Alex Dumas	KTM								25	0
	(Spain) Adrián Carrasco	Yamaha	26								0
	(South Africa) Jared Schultz	Yamaha						28			0
	(Slovakia) Roman Kučera	Kawasaki					28				0
	(Australia) Lachlan Epis	Kawasaki				28					0
	(Italy) Thomas Brianti	KTM						29			0
	(United Kingdom) Luke Verwey	Kawasaki				29					0
	(Netherlands) Bibi Damen	KTM		29							0
	(France) Steffie Naud	Kawasaki								31	0
	(Czech Republic) Vojtěch Schwarz	Yamaha					31				0
	(Czech Republic) Alexandra Pelikánová	Yamaha					32				0
	(Portugal) Pedro Fragoso	KTM							35		0
	(United Kingdom) Kade Verwey	Kawasaki				Ret					0
	(United Kingdom) Edmund Best	Kawasaki				Ret					0
	(France) Hugo Girardet	Kawasaki								DNS	0
Pos.	Rider	Bike	ARA (Spain)	ASS (Netherlands)	IMO (Italy)	DON (United Kingdom)	BRN (Czech Republic)	MIS (Italy)	POR (Portugal)	MAG (France)	Pts.

Colour	Result
Gold	Winner
Silver	Second place
Bronze	Third place
Green	Points classification
Blue	Non-points classification
Blue	Non-classified finish (NC)
Purple	Retired, not classified (Ret)
Red	Did not qualify (DNQ)
Red	Did not pre-qualify (DNPQ)
Black	Disqualified (DSQ)
White	Did not start (DNS)
White	Withdrew (WD)
White	Race cancelled (C)
Blank	Did not practice (DNP)
Blank	Did not arrive (DNA)
Blank	Excluded (EX)

**Bold** – Pole position
Italics – Fastest lap

=== Teams' championship ===
Pos.	Team	Bike No.	ARA (Spain)	ASS (Netherlands)	IMO (Italy)	DON (United Kingdom)	BRN (Czech Republic)	MIS (Italy)	POR (Portugal)	MAG (France)	Pts.
1	(Spain) DS Junior Team	2	6	4	**1**	**1**	11	10	10	13	159
1	(Spain) DS Junior Team	20	8	7	11	2	12	9	9	10	159
2	(Netherlands) Motoport Kawasaki	95	2	3	Ret	6	7	Ret	1	**Ret**	104
2	(Netherlands) Motoport Kawasaki	6	5	Ret	Ret				4	Ret	104
2	(Netherlands) Motoport Kawasaki	3					19	19			104
2	(Netherlands) Motoport Kawasaki	83				28					104
3	(Spain) BCD Yamaha MS Racing	33	13	11	Ret	11	8	Ret	7	1	100
3	(Spain) BCD Yamaha MS Racing	69	17	10	7	18	9	6	Ret	4	100
3	(Spain) BCD Yamaha MS Racing	36	22								100
4	(Italy) Kawasaki ParkinGO Team	8	**3**	**Ret**	8	8	DNS	2	2	2	95
4	(Italy) Kawasaki ParkinGO Team	27	Ret	Ret	13	Ret	20	Ret	20	18	95
5	(Germany) Freudenberg KTM WorldSSP Team	43	9	1	4	10	10	5	29	6	83
5	(Germany) Freudenberg KTM WorldSSP Team	97	15	12	Ret	16	NC	22	27	30	83
6	(Italy) GP Project Team	22	4	6	Ret		6	Ret	Ret	7	83
6	(Italy) GP Project Team	14	12	18	Ret	4	14	12	5	9	83
7	(Spain) Pertamina Almería BCD Junior Team by MS (Spain) BCD Pertamina Junior Team by MS Racing	81	Ret	9	Ret	12	33	3	3	3	59
8	(Germany) Nutec – Benjan – Kawasaki	93	11	5	10	Ret	2	Ret	21	11	58
8	(Germany) Nutec – Benjan – Kawasaki	71	Ret	Ret	Ret	15	Ret	26	**6**	Ret	58
9	(Italy) BIBLION YAMAHA MOTOXRACING	55	16	Ret	5	9	**1**	**7**	Ret	15	58
9	(Italy) BIBLION YAMAHA MOTOXRACING	99	14	Ret	Ret	Ret	25		28	14	58
9	(Italy) BIBLION YAMAHA MOTOXRACING	65						15			58
10	(Spain) ETG Racing	21	10	Ret	2	3	3	Ret	16	16	58
10	(Spain) ETG Racing	78	19	26	20	24	26	24	31	23	58
11	(Netherlands) KTM Forton Racing Team	15	7	2	9	23	5	Ret	Ret	8	55
11	(Netherlands) KTM Forton Racing Team	5	Ret	Ret	21	Ret	24	23	34	29	55
12	(Netherlands) KTM Forton Junior Team	17	1	Ret	Ret	5	4	Ret			50
12	(Netherlands) KTM Forton Junior Team	72							15	Ret	50
13	(Germany) Freudenberg KTM Junior Team	41	Ret	8	6	7	13	8	14	17	40
14	(Italy) Team Trasimeno	19	DSQ	DSQ	12	14	21	4	Ret	5	33
14	(Italy) Team Trasimeno	39						13			33
14	(Italy) Team Trasimeno	61							17	DNS	33
14	(Italy) Team Trasimeno	84	24	20	22	Ret	WD				33
14	(Italy) Team Trasimeno	62						28			33
15	(Italy) PRODINA IRCOS Team	51			Ret			1			25
16	(Italy) PROGP Racing	85			3			Ret			16
17	(Spain) DEZA-Córdoba-Patrimonio de la Humanidad	87							11		9
17	(Spain) DEZA-Córdoba-Patrimonio de la Humanidad	52							12		9
18	(Spain) Kawasaki PALMETO PL Racing	47							8		8
19	(Spain) TERRA E MOTO	96	Ret	19	17	17	Ret	11			8
19	(Spain) TERRA E MOTO	34							13		8
19	(Spain) TERRA E MOTO	91								21	8
20	(Spain) Pertamina Almería BCD by MS Racing	12	Ret	13	26	13	NC	Ret	18	20	6
21	(Austria) Samurai–YART Racing (Austria) Samurai Racing	25				Ret	15			12	5
21	(Austria) Samurai–YART Racing (Austria) Samurai Racing	79	27	23	Ret	26	Ret	16	25	26	5
21	(Austria) Samurai–YART Racing (Austria) Samurai Racing	44	28	24	25	22	27	18	24	Ret	5
22	(Italy) GRT Yamaha WorldSSP300 Team	28	20	15	14	19	23	21	33	27	3
22	(Italy) GRT Yamaha WorldSSP300 Team	54	NC	28	19	Ret	22	17	19	Ret	3
23	(Spain) C.M. Racing A.S.D.	16	18	14							2
24	(Hungary) Team Tóth – YART	64	DNS	16	18	21	16	14	22	19	2
24	(Hungary) Team Tóth – YART	18	23	17	Ret	Ret					2
24	(Hungary) Team Tóth – YART	30					18	Ret	26	Ret	2
25	(Spain) Racedays	13	21	21	15	20	17	20	23	24	1
	(Italy) MMR	11			16						0
	(Netherlands) Benro Racing	4		22							0
	(Italy) Team GoEleven Kawasaki	75								22	0
	(Italy) Scuderia Maranga Racing	7	29	27	23	25	30	25	30	28	0
	(Italy) Scuderia Maranga Racing	58	Ret	25	24	27	29	27	32	32	0
	(Poland) Polish Talent Team	30	25	Ret							0
	(United States) KTM Orange Brigade/JP43 Training	23								25	0
	(Spain) ARCO–MotoR UPV University Team	89	26								0
	(Slovakia) Motoclub Baláž/KPA	37					28				0
	(Netherlands) Bibi's Racing Team	88		29							0
	(United Kingdom) Team XG Racing	76				29					0
	(United Kingdom) Team XG Racing	77				Ret					0
	(Italy) Team Runner Bike	48						29			0
	(Czech Republic) Motosport Schwarz Racing Team	73					31				0
	(France) Moto Team	9								31	0
	(Czech Republic) JRT Brno Circuit	32					32				0
	(Portugal) Miguel Oliveira Racing Team	10							35		0
	(United Kingdom) Symcirrus Motorsport	35				Ret					
	(France) Team B2G	70								DNS	
Pos.	Team	Bike No.	ARA (Spain)	ASS (Netherlands)	IMO (Italy)	DON (United Kingdom)	BRN (Czech Republic)	MIS (Italy)	POR (Portugal)	MAG (France)	Pts.

=== Manufacturers' championship ===
Pos.	Manufacturer	ARA (Spain)	ASS (Netherlands)	IMO (Italy)	DON (United Kingdom)	BRN (Czech Republic)	MIS (Italy)	POR (Portugal)	MAG (France)	Pts.
1	(Japan) Kawasaki	2	3	1	1	2	1	1	2	176
2	(Japan) Yamaha	13	9	3	9	1	3	3	1	115
3	(Austria) KTM	1	1	4	5	4	5	14	6	110
4	(Japan) Honda	21	21	15	20	17	20	23	24	1
Pos.	Manufacturer	ARA (Spain)	ASS (Netherlands)	IMO (Italy)	DON (United Kingdom)	BRN (Czech Republic)	MIS (Italy)	POR (Portugal)	MAG (France)	Pts.
