= 2017 Supersport 300 World Championship =

2017 Supersport 300 World Championship
Previous:	none	Next:	2018
Support series: Superbike World Championship; Supersport World Championship; European Superstock 1000 Championship

The 2017 Supersport 300 World Championship was the first season of the Supersport 300 World Championship. The debut season was contested over nine races, which were held at all the European rounds of 2017 Superbike World Championship, starting from 2 April at MotorLand Aragón in Spain to 22 October at Circuito de Jerez in Spain.

== Race calendar and results ==
2017 calendar
Round	Country	Circuit	Date	Superpole	Fastest lap	Winning rider	Winning team
1	Spain	MotorLand Aragón	2 April	(Netherlands) Scott Deroue	(Spain) Mika Pérez	(Netherlands) Scott Deroue	MTM HS Kawasaki
2	Netherlands	TT Circuit Assen	30 April	(Spain) Borja Sánchez	(Italy) Alfonso Coppola	(Netherlands) Scott Deroue	MTM HS Kawasaki
3	Italy	Autodromo Enzo e Dino Ferrari	14 May	(Spain) Mika Pérez	(South Africa) Dorren Loureiro	(Spain) Marc García	Halcourier Racing
4	United Kingdom	Donington Park	28 May	(Italy) Alfonso Coppola	(Spain) Mika Pérez	(Spain) Mika Pérez	WILSport Racedays
5	Italy	Misano World Circuit Marco Simoncelli	18 June	(Spain) Mika Pérez	(Italy) Armando Pontone	(Spain) Mika Pérez	WILSport Racedays
6	Germany	Lausitzring	20 August	(Italy) Alfonso Coppola	(Spain) Marc García	(Italy) Alfonso Coppola	SK Racing
7	Portugal	Autódromo Internacional do Algarve	17 September	(Italy) Alfonso Coppola	(Spain) Mika Pérez	(Spain) Ana Carrasco	ETG Racing
8	France	Circuit de Nevers Magny-Cours	1 October	(France) Alan Muel	(Spain) Daniel Valle	(Spain) Marc García	Halcourier Racing
9	Spain	Circuito de Jerez	22 October	(Spain) Marc García	(Italy) Alfonso Coppola	(Indonesia) Galang Hendra Pratama	Team Motoxracing

== Entry list ==
2017 entry list
Team	Constructor	Motorcycle	No.	Rider	Rounds
ETG Racing	Kawasaki	Kawasaki Ninja 300	2	(Spain) Ana Carrasco	All
Pearle Gebben Racing	Yamaha	Yamaha YZF-R3	4	(Netherlands) Finn de Bruin	2
GRT Yamaha WorldSSP300 Team	Yamaha	Yamaha YZF-R3	6	(Netherlands) Robert Schotman	All
GRT Yamaha WorldSSP300 Team	Yamaha	Yamaha YZF-R3	14	(France) Enzo de la Vega	All
2R Road Racing; Bierreti by 2R	Yamaha	Yamaha YZF-R3	7	(Italy) Nicola Settimo	All
2R Road Racing; Bierreti by 2R	Yamaha	Yamaha YZF-R3	13	(Italy) Jacopo Facco	1–5
2R Road Racing; Bierreti by 2R	Yamaha	Yamaha YZF-R3	58	(United Kingdom) Trystan Finocchiaro	6–9
MVR Racing	Yamaha	Yamaha YZF-R3	9	(Netherlands) Ruben Doorakkers	All
3ENNE#Racing; 3ENNE#Racing – Chiodo Moto	Yamaha	Yamaha YZF-R3	11	(Italy) Nicolas Cupaioli	1–5
3ENNE#Racing; 3ENNE#Racing – Chiodo Moto	Honda	Honda CBR500R	99	(Italy) Paolo Grassia	7–8
Pertamina Almería Racing Team	Yamaha	Yamaha YZF-R3	12	(Indonesia) Ali Adriansyah Rusmiputro	All
SK Racing	Yamaha	Yamaha YZF-R3	13	(Italy) Jacopo Facco	7–9
SK Racing	Yamaha	Yamaha YZF-R3	15	(Italy) Alfonso Coppola	All
SK Racing	Yamaha	Yamaha YZF-R3	84	(Italy) Michael Carbonera	All
SK Racing	Yamaha	Yamaha YZF-R3	95	(Italy) Giuseppe De Gruttola	1–6
Freudenberg Racing-Team	Yamaha	Yamaha YZF-R3	16	(Germany) Tim Georgi	6
Freudenberg Racing-Team	Yamaha	Yamaha YZF-R3	97	(Germany) Maximilian Kappler	6
Scuderia Maranga Racing	Honda	Honda CBR500R	17	(Germany) Gabriel Noderer	All
Scuderia Maranga Racing	Honda	Honda CBR500R	35	(Italy) Alex Triglia	All
Team Tóth	Yamaha	Yamaha YZF-R3	18	(United Kingdom) Alex Murley	All
Team Tóth	Yamaha	Yamaha YZF-R3	52	(South Africa) Troy Bezuidenhout	1–3
Team Tóth	Yamaha	Yamaha YZF-R3	53	(France) Valentin Grimoux	4–9
ParkinGO DS Junior Team	Yamaha	Yamaha YZF-R3	19	(Italy) Edoardo Rovelli	All
ParkinGO DS Junior Team	Yamaha	Yamaha YZF-R3	27	(Italy) Filippo Rovelli	All
DS Junior Team	Kawasaki	Kawasaki Ninja 300	20	(South Africa) Dorren Loureiro	1–2
DS Junior Team	Yamaha	Yamaha YZF-R3	20	(South Africa) Dorren Loureiro	3–9
Sourz Foods – Benjan Racing; Hel Performance – Benjan Racing	Kawasaki	Kawasaki Ninja 300	21	(New Zealand) Avalon Biddle	1–6
Sourz Foods – Benjan Racing; Hel Performance – Benjan Racing	Kawasaki	Kawasaki Ninja 300	66	(United Kingdom) Taz Taylor	7–8
Sourz Foods – Benjan Racing; Hel Performance – Benjan Racing	Kawasaki	Kawasaki Ninja 300	71	(Australia) Tom Edwards	9
Team Motoxracing	Yamaha	Yamaha YZF-R3	22	(Ukraine) Mykyta Kalinin	All
Team Motoxracing	Yamaha	Yamaha YZF-R3	32	(France) Alan Muel	8
Team Motoxracing	Yamaha	Yamaha YZF-R3	55	(Indonesia) Galang Hendra Pratama	7, 9
3570 Made in CIV	Kawasaki	Kawasaki Ninja 300	23	(Italy) Manuel Bastianelli	All
3570 Made in CIV	Kawasaki	Kawasaki Ninja 300	49	(Italy) Marco Carusi	5–9
3570 Made in CIV	Kawasaki	Kawasaki Ninja 300	99	(Italy) Paolo Grassia	1–4
Halcourier Racing; Halcourier Racing Viajes 2000	Yamaha	Yamaha YZF-R3	25	(Spain) Borja Sánchez	All
Halcourier Racing; Halcourier Racing Viajes 2000	Yamaha	Yamaha YZF-R3	33	(Spain) Daniel Valle	All
Halcourier Racing; Halcourier Racing Viajes 2000	Yamaha	Yamaha YZF-R3	41	(Spain) Marc García	All
Halcourier Racing; Halcourier Racing Viajes 2000	Yamaha	Yamaha YZF-R3	81	(Spain) Manuel González	9
Hopkins Racing	Kawasaki	Kawasaki Ninja 300	26	(United Kingdom) Luke Hopkins	1–2, 4–6
Hopkins Racing	Kawasaki	Kawasaki Ninja 300	94	(United Kingdom) Carl Mitchell	3
Terra e Moto	Yamaha	Yamaha YZF-R3	28	(Italy) Paolo Giacomini	All
Team Runner Bike	KTM	KTM RC 390 R	42	(Germany) Jan-Ole Jähnig	9
Team Runner Bike	KTM	KTM RC 390 R	72	(Italy) Omar Bonoli	9
Samurai Racing	Yamaha	Yamaha YZF-R3	44	(South Africa) Samuel Lochoff	7
Vos – TKR Racing	Honda	Honda CBR500R	51	(Netherlands) Glenn van Straalen	2
Kawasaki Puccetti Racing	Kawasaki	Kawasaki Ninja 300	54	(Turkey) Harun Çabuk	1–3, 6–9
Kawasaki Puccetti Racing	Kawasaki	Kawasaki Ninja 300	64	(Turkey) Asrın Rodi Pak	4–5
GP Project Team	Kawasaki	Kawasaki Ninja 300	56	(Italy) Nicola Bernabè	5
WBY Racing Team	Yamaha	Yamaha YZF-R3	57	(France) Dorian Da-Ré	8
Wójcik FHP YART Racing Team	Yamaha	Yamaha YZF-R3	61	(Poland) Daniel Blin	7
DDM by BWG_Bike & Motor RT_Grimaldi; BWG Racing–Grimaldi	Kawasaki	Kawasaki Ninja 300	62	(South Africa) Jared Schultz	1–6, 8
DDM by BWG_Bike & Motor RT_Grimaldi; BWG Racing–Grimaldi	Kawasaki	Kawasaki Ninja 300	133	(Australia) Reid Battye	9
MTM HS Kawasaki	Kawasaki	Kawasaki Ninja 300	75	(Netherlands) Scott Deroue	All
MTM HS Kawasaki	Kawasaki	Kawasaki Ninja 300	79	(United Kingdom) Chris Taylor	All
DEZA–Córdoba Patrimonio de la Humanidad	Honda	Honda CBR500R	77	(Spain) Andrea Sibaja	1, 9
IodaRacing	Yamaha	Yamaha YZF-R3	80	(Italy) Armando Pontone	All
Team Trasimeno	Yamaha	Yamaha YZF-R3	87	(Belgium) Angelo Licciardi	All
WILSport Racedays	Honda	Honda CBR500R	88	(Spain) Mika Pérez	All
MotorZenit	Yamaha	Yamaha YZF-R3	91	(San Marino) Luca Bernardi	3, 5
Kallio Racing	Yamaha	Yamaha YZF-R3	121	(Finland) Kimi Patova	All
Kallio Racing	Yamaha	Yamaha YZF-R3	130	(Brazil) Renzo Ferreira	All

Key
Regular rider
Wildcard rider
Replacement rider

- All entries used Pirelli tyres.

== Championship standings ==
=== Riders' championship ===
Pos.	Rider	Bike	ARA (Spain)	ASS (Netherlands)	IMO (Italy)	DON (United Kingdom)	MIS (Italy)	LAU (Germany)	POR (Portugal)	MAG (France)	JER (Spain)	Pts
1	(Spain) Marc García	Yamaha	Ret	6	1	2	6	2	3	1	**4**	139
2	(Italy) Alfonso Coppola	Yamaha	11	3	2	**DSQ**	3	**1**	**2**	2	3	138
3	(Netherlands) Scott Deroue	Kawasaki	**1**	1	11	3	12	DSQ	7	9	2	111
4	(Spain) Mika Pérez	Honda	3	24	**10**	1	**1**	DSQ	5	4	8	104
5	(Spain) Daniel Valle	Yamaha	2	Ret	13	8	10	4	4	5	5	85
6	(Spain) Borja Sánchez	Yamaha	4	**4**	4	22	7	5	6	7	9	85
7	(Netherlands) Robert Schotman	Yamaha	Ret	Ret	9	5	5	3	9	3	6	78
8	(Spain) Ana Carrasco	Kawasaki	10	7	12	9	14	12	1	20	14	59
9	(South Africa) Dorren Loureiro	Kawasaki	8	5								59
9	(South Africa) Dorren Loureiro	Yamaha			6	12	4	9	14	13	15	59
10	(Ukraine) Mykyta Kalinin	Yamaha	Ret	Ret	3	Ret	8	6	12	14	12	44
11	(Italy) Armando Pontone	Yamaha	15	15	21	4	2	10	19	28	16	41
12	(Italy) Paolo Grassia	Kawasaki	6	23	8	11						39
12	(Italy) Paolo Grassia	Honda							10	6		39
13	(United Kingdom) Alex Murley	Yamaha	13	10	15	10	11	Ret	15	12	32	26
14	(Indonesia) Galang Hendra Pratama	Yamaha							Ret		1	25
15	(Italy) Giuseppe De Gruttola	Yamaha	7	13	5	14	Ret	25				25
16	(Italy) Paolo Giacomini	Yamaha	9	Ret	Ret	6	Ret	19	35	29	10	23
17	(Italy) Jacopo Facco	Yamaha	21	12	19	17	Ret		8	8	13	23
18	(Indonesia) Ali Adriansyah Rusmiputro	Yamaha	Ret	Ret	14	7	Ret	11	16	21	11	21
19	(Netherlands) Glenn van Straalen	Honda		2								20
20	(Belgium) Angelo Licciardi	Yamaha	5	Ret	22	Ret	9	15	18	24	24	19
21	(France) Enzo de la Vega	Yamaha	Ret	Ret	18	16	15	Ret	13	10	7	19
22	(Turkey) Harun Çabuk	Kawasaki	14	8	DNS			17	11	18	20	15
23	(Germany) Tim Georgi	Yamaha						7				9
24	(San Marino) Luca Bernardi	Yamaha			7		Ret					9
25	(Italy) Michael Carbonera	Yamaha	20	17	23	15	13	Ret	23	11	22	9
26	(Germany) Maximilian Kappler	Yamaha						8				8
27	(Netherlands) Ruben Doorakkers	Yamaha	Ret	9	27	Ret	21	18	24	26	35	7
28	(Finland) Kimi Patova	Yamaha	Ret	11	Ret	20	Ret	Ret	33	Ret	21	5
29	(Italy) Manuel Bastianelli	Kawasaki	12	Ret	17	Ret	18	Ret	29	23	23	4
30	(Germany) Gabriel Noderer	Honda	19	14	25	19	Ret	14	26	Ret	26	4
31	(Italy) Alex Triglia	Honda	23	Ret	24	18	28	13	Ret	19	Ret	3
32	(Italy) Filippo Rovelli	Yamaha	17	16	20	13	16	16	17	17	18	3
33	(France) Valentin Grimoux	Yamaha				27	23	21	32	15	30	1
	(United Kingdom) Chris Taylor	Kawasaki	16	Ret	16	Ret	Ret	DSQ	21	Ret	17	0
	(United Kingdom) Taz Taylor	Kawasaki							22	16		0
	(Italy) Marco Carusi	Kawasaki					17	Ret	25	31	27	0
	(Brazil) Renzo Ferreira	Yamaha	Ret	18	Ret	Ret	22	20	31	27	29	0
	(Italy) Edoardo Rovelli	Yamaha	18	26	26	23	24	23	27	Ret	31	0
	(Australia) Tom Edwards	Kawasaki									19	0
	(Italy) Nicola Bernabè	Kawasaki					19					0
	(New Zealand) Avalon Biddle	Kawasaki	Ret	19	29	26	26	Ret				0
	(Poland) Daniel Blin	Yamaha							20			0
	(Turkey) Asrın Rodi Pak	Kawasaki				24	20					0
	(Italy) Nicola Settimo	Yamaha	DNQ	20	30	28	25	22	30	25	28	0
	(South Africa) Jared Schultz	Kawasaki	DNQ	22	31	21	Ret	24		30		0
	(South Africa) Troy Bezuidenhout	Yamaha	25	21	28							0
	(France) Dorian Da-Ré	Yamaha								22		0
	(United Kingdom) Luke Hopkins	Kawasaki	22	DNS		25	Ret	DNQ				0
	(Spain) Andrea Sibaja	Honda	24								33	0
	(Australia) Reid Battye	Kawasaki									25	0
	(Italy) Nicolas Cupaioli	Yamaha	DNQ	25	33	29	27					0
	(South Africa) Samuel Lochoff	Yamaha							28			0
	(United Kingdom) Trystan Finocchiaro	Yamaha						Ret	34	32	Ret	0
	(United Kingdom) Carl Mitchell	Kawasaki			32							0
	(Spain) Manuel González	Yamaha									34	0
	(Italy) Omar Bonoli	KTM									NC	0
	(Germany) Jan-Ole Jähnig	KTM									NC	0
	(France) Alan Muel	Yamaha								**Ret**		0
	(Netherlands) Finn de Bruin	Yamaha		Ret								0
Pos.	Rider	Bike	ARA (Spain)	ASS (Netherlands)	IMO (Italy)	DON (United Kingdom)	MIS (Italy)	LAU (Germany)	POR (Portugal)	MAG (France)	JER (Spain)	Pts

Colour	Result
Gold	Winner
Silver	Second place
Bronze	Third place
Green	Points classification
Blue	Non-points classification
Blue	Non-classified finish (NC)
Purple	Retired, not classified (Ret)
Red	Did not qualify (DNQ)
Red	Did not pre-qualify (DNPQ)
Black	Disqualified (DSQ)
White	Did not start (DNS)
White	Withdrew (WD)
White	Race cancelled (C)
Blank	Did not practice (DNP)
Blank	Did not arrive (DNA)
Blank	Excluded (EX)

**Bold** – Pole position
Italics – Fastest lap

=== Teams' championship ===
Pos.	Team	Bike No.	ARA (Spain)	ASS (Netherlands)	IMO (Italy)	DON (United Kingdom)	MIS (Italy)	LAU (Germany)	POR (Portugal)	MAG (France)	JER (Spain)	Pts.
1	(Spain) Halcourier Racing (Spain) Halcourier Racing Viajes 2000	41	Ret	6	1	2	6	2	3	1	**4**	263
1	(Spain) Halcourier Racing (Spain) Halcourier Racing Viajes 2000	33	2	Ret	13	8	10	4	4	5	5	263
1	(Spain) Halcourier Racing (Spain) Halcourier Racing Viajes 2000	25	4	**4**	4	22	7	5	6	7	9	263
1	(Spain) Halcourier Racing (Spain) Halcourier Racing Viajes 2000	81									34	263
2	(Italy) SK Racing	15	11	3	2	**DSQ**	3	**1**	**2**	2	3	186
2	(Italy) SK Racing	95	7	13	5	14	Ret	25				186
2	(Italy) SK Racing	13							8	8	13	186
2	(Italy) SK Racing	84	20	17	23	15	13	Ret	23	11	22	186
3	(Belgium) MTM HS Kawasaki	75	**1**	1	11	3	12	DSQ	7	9	2	111
3	(Belgium) MTM HS Kawasaki	79	16	Ret	16	Ret	Ret	DSQ	21	Ret	17	111
4	(Spain) WILSport Racedays	88	3	24	**10**	1	**1**	DSQ	5	4	8	104
5	(Italy) GRT Yamaha WorldSSP300 Team	6	Ret	Ret	9	5	5	3	9	3	6	97
5	(Italy) GRT Yamaha WorldSSP300 Team	14	Ret	Ret	18	16	15	Ret	13	10	7	97
6	(Italy) Team MOTOXRACING	22	Ret	Ret	3	Ret	8	6	12	14	12	69
6	(Italy) Team MOTOXRACING	55							Ret		1	69
6	(Italy) Team MOTOXRACING	32								**Ret**		69
7	(Spain) DS Junior Team	20	8	5	6	12	4	9	14	13	15	59
8	(Spain) ETG Racing	2	10	7	12	9	14	12	1	20	14	59
9	(Italy) IodaRacing	80	15	15	21	4	2	10	19	28	16	41
10	(Italy) 3570 Made in CIV	99	6	23	8	11						27
10	(Italy) 3570 Made in CIV	23	12	Ret	17	Ret	18	Ret	29	23	23	27
10	(Italy) 3570 Made in CIV	49					17	Ret	25	31	27	27
11	(Hungary) Team Tóth	18	13	10	15	10	11	Ret	15	12	32	27
11	(Hungary) Team Tóth	53				27	23	21	32	15	30	27
11	(Hungary) Team Tóth	52	25	21	28							27
12	(Spain) Terra e Moto	28	9	Ret	Ret	6	Ret	19	35	29	10	23
13	(Spain) Pertamina Almería Racing Team	12	Ret	Ret	14	7	Ret	11	16	21	11	21
14	(Netherlands) Vos – TKR Racing	51		2								20
15	(Italy) Team Trasimeno	87	5	Ret	22	Ret	9	15	18	24	24	19
16	(Germany) Freudenberg Racing-Team	16						7				17
16	(Germany) Freudenberg Racing-Team	97						8				17
17	(Italy) 3ENNE#Racing (Italy) 3ENNE#Racing – Chiodo Moto	99							10	6		16
17	(Italy) 3ENNE#Racing (Italy) 3ENNE#Racing – Chiodo Moto	11	DNQ	25	33	29	27					16
18	(Italy) Kawasaki Puccetti Racing	54	14	8	DNS			17	11	18	20	15
18	(Italy) Kawasaki Puccetti Racing	64				24	20					15
19	(San Marino) MotorZenit	91			7		Ret					9
20	(Italy) Scuderia Maranga Racing	17	19	14	25	19	Ret	14	26	Ret	26	7
20	(Italy) Scuderia Maranga Racing	35	23	Ret	24	18	28	13	Ret	19	Ret	7
21	(Netherlands) MVR Racing	9	Ret	9	27	Ret	21	18	24	26	35	7
22	(Finland) Kallio Racing	121	Ret	11	Ret	20	Ret	Ret	33	Ret	21	5
22	(Finland) Kallio Racing	130	Ret	18	Ret	Ret	22	20	31	27	29	5
23	(Italy) 2R Road Racing (Italy) Bierreti by 2R	13	21	12	19	17	Ret					4
23	(Italy) 2R Road Racing (Italy) Bierreti by 2R	7	DNQ	20	30	28	25	22	30	25	28	4
23	(Italy) 2R Road Racing (Italy) Bierreti by 2R	58						Ret	34	32	Ret	4
24	(Spain) ParkinGO DS Junior Team	27	17	16	20	13	16	16	17	17	18	3
24	(Spain) ParkinGO DS Junior Team	19	18	26	26	23	24	23	27	Ret	31	3
	(Netherlands) Sourz Foods – Benjan Racing (Netherlands) Hel Performance – Benjan Racing	66							22	16		0
	(Netherlands) Sourz Foods – Benjan Racing (Netherlands) Hel Performance – Benjan Racing	21	Ret	19	29	26	26	Ret				0
	(Netherlands) Sourz Foods – Benjan Racing (Netherlands) Hel Performance – Benjan Racing	71									19	0
	(Italy) GP Project Team	56					19					0
	(Poland) Wójcik FHP YART Racing Team	61							20			0
	(Italy) DDM by BWG_Bike & Motor RT_Grimaldi (Italy) BWG Racing–Grimaldi	62	DNQ	22	31	21	Ret	24		30		0
	(Italy) DDM by BWG_Bike & Motor RT_Grimaldi (Italy) BWG Racing–Grimaldi	133									25	0
	(United Kingdom) Hopkins Racing	26	22	DNS		25	Ret	DNQ				0
	(United Kingdom) Hopkins Racing	94			32							0
	(France) WBY Racing Team	57								22		0
	(Spain) DEZA–Córdoba Patrimonio de la Humanidad	77	24								33	0
	(Austria) Samurai Racing	44							28			0
	(Italy) Team Runner Bike	42									NC	0
	(Italy) Team Runner Bike	72									NC	0
	(Netherlands) Pearle Gebben Racing	4		Ret								
Pos.	Team	Bike No.	ARA (Spain)	ASS (Netherlands)	IMO (Italy)	DON (United Kingdom)	MIS (Italy)	LAU (Germany)	POR (Portugal)	MAG (France)	JER (Spain)	Pts.

=== Manufacturers' championship ===
Pos.	Manufacturer	ARA (Spain)	ASS (Netherlands)	IMO (Italy)	DON (United Kingdom)	MIS (Italy)	LAU (Germany)	POR (Portugal)	MAG (France)	JER (Spain)	Pts
1	(Japan) Yamaha	2	3	1	2	2	1	2	1	1	196
2	(Japan) Kawasaki	1	1	8	3	12	12	1	9	2	134
3	(Japan) Honda	3	2	10	1	1	13	5	4	8	127
	(Austria) KTM									NC	0
Pos.	Manufacturer	ARA (Spain)	ASS (Netherlands)	IMO (Italy)	DON (United Kingdom)	MIS (Italy)	LAU (Germany)	POR (Portugal)	MAG (France)	JER (Spain)	Pts
