= Kõlvart =

Kõlvart is a surname. Notable people with the surname include:

- Anastassia Kovalenko-Kõlvart (born 1991), Estonian motorcycle road racer and politician
- Mihhail Kõlvart (born 1977), Estonian politician
