= 2016 European Junior Cup =

2016 European Junior Cup
Previous:	2015	Next:	none
Support series: Superbike World Championship; Supersport World Championship; FIM Superstock 1000 Cup

The 2016 European Junior Cup was the sixth and last season of the European Junior Cup. It was contested by riders aged 14–21 (24 for females) on equal Honda CBR650F bikes over eight races, starting on 3 April at Motorland Aragón and ending on 16 October at Jerez.

Spanish rider Mika Pérez claimed the championship title, while the Women's European Cup was won by Avalon Biddle, from New Zealand.

== Entry list ==
No.	Rider	Rounds
2	(Estonia) Anastassia Kovalenko	1, 4, 6–7
3	(Canada) Stacey Nesbitt	All
4	(France) Romain Lecarpentier	All
7	(Italy) Edoardo Angeloni	4
8	(Spain) Mika Pérez	All
9	(New Zealand) Connor London	All
10	(Turkey) Furkan Eryılmaz	All
11	(Italy) Riccardo Picciuto	All
12	(South Africa) Byron Bester	All
14	(Switzerland) Théo Clerc	All
15	(Italy) Alfonso Coppola	All
17	(Germany) Gabriel Noderer	All
18	(United Kingdom) Alex Murley	All
19	(Israel) Dean Gopher	All
20	(South Africa) Dorren Loureiro	1–4
21	(New Zealand) Avalon Biddle	All
22	(Italy) Stefano Ferrante	4
23	(United Kingdom) Charley Oakland	1–3, 5–7
24	(Netherlands) Djim Ulrich	2
25	(United States) Ashton Yates	7
27	(Hungary) Viktória Kis	1–2
28	(New Zealand) Shane Richardson	7
34	(United Kingdom) Daniel Drayton	All
38	(Estonia) Hannes Soomer	1–4
45	(Greece) Dimitris Karakostas	All
47	(Spain) Ferran Hernández	7
48	(Italy) Michael Carbonera	All
52	(South Africa) Troy Bezuidenhout	1–3, 5–7
54	(Turkey) Harun Çabuk	1–3, 5–7
55	(Spain) Juan Carlos Cárdenas	7
58	(France) Antoine Chapeau	6
59	(France) Dorian Laville	All
63	(France) Joseph Foray	6
64	(Turkey) Asrın Rodi Pak	All
73	(South Africa) Zanté Otto	5
77	(United Kingdom) Kade Verwey	5–7
78	(Republic of Ireland) Korie McGreevy	3
80	(Italy) Alessandro Zetti	1, 4
84	(Italy) Paolo Grassia	All
88	(Spain) Félix Periane	1
91	(Republic of Ireland) Nicole Lynch	All
93	(United Kingdom) Monica Isaac	7
94	(Hungary) Richárd Bódis	All
95	(Italy) Giuseppe De Gruttola	All
97	(Greece) Nikos Karakostas	All
99	(Switzerland) Laura Rodriguez	1–4

== Race calendar and results ==
Round	Country	Circuit	Date	Pole position	Fastest lap	Winning rider
1	Spain	Motorland Aragón	3 April	(Italy) Giuseppe De Gruttola	(Italy) Giuseppe De Gruttola	(Turkey) Harun Çabuk
2	Netherlands	TT Circuit Assen	17 April	(France) Dorian Laville	(Spain) Mika Pérez	(Estonia) Hannes Soomer
3	United Kingdom	Donington Park	29 May	(Spain) Mika Pérez	(Spain) Mika Pérez	(Spain) Mika Pérez
4	Italy	Misano World Circuit Marco Simoncelli	19 June	(Estonia) Hannes Soomer	(France) Dorian Laville	(Estonia) Hannes Soomer
5	Germany	Lausitzring	18 September	(Spain) Mika Pérez	(Turkey) Harun Çabuk	(Turkey) Harun Çabuk
6	France	Circuit de Nevers Magny-Cours	2 October	(Hungary) Richárd Bódis	(Hungary) Richárd Bódis	(Italy) Paolo Grassia
7	Spain	Circuito de Jerez	15 October	(Spain) Mika Pérez	(Italy) Paolo Grassia	(Italy) Paolo Grassia
7	Spain	Circuito de Jerez	16 October	(Spain) Mika Pérez	(Turkey) Harun Çabuk	(Turkey) Harun Çabuk

== Championship standings ==
=== Riders' championship ===
Pos.	Rider	ARA (Spain)	ASS (Netherlands)	DON (United Kingdom)	MIS (Italy)	LAU (Germany)	MAG (France)	JER (Spain)		Pts
1	(Spain) Mika Pérez	2	3	**1**	2	**2**	4	**2**	**4**	147
2	(Italy) Paolo Grassia	3	6	3	4	7	1	1	8	122
3	(Turkey) Harun Çabuk	1	Ret	Ret		1	5	4	1	99
4	(Italy) Alfonso Coppola	9	5	4	5	10	2	6	2	98
5	(France) Dorian Laville	6	**2**	2	Ret	6	3	9	6	93
6	(Estonia) Hannes Soomer	5	1	6	**1**					71
7	(Hungary) Richárd Bódis	7	4	10	3	5	**Ret**	3	Ret	71
8	(South Africa) Troy Bezuidenhout	8	7	Ret		3	6	8	5	62
9	(Italy) Giuseppe De Gruttola	**4**	Ret	Ret	14	4	22	5	3	55
10	(Germany) Gabriel Noderer	16	8	9	10	12	7	10	7	49
11	(France) Romain Lecarpentier	14	10	8	Ret	8	8	14	Ret	34
12	(South Africa) Byron Bester	20	9	18	9	9	15	12	9	33
13	(United Kingdom) Daniel Drayton	23	17	7	6	19	9	11	Ret	31
14	(United Kingdom) Alex Murley	12	13	11	Ret	Ret	10	13	13	24
15	(Italy) Michael Carbonera	11	19	12	7	26	16	15	12	23
16	(New Zealand) Avalon Biddle	15	11	15	8	15	11	17	15	22
17	(South Africa) Dorren Loureiro	10	DNS	5	Ret					17
18	(Greece) Dimitris Karakostas	13	Ret	13	11	11	17	19	16	16
19	(Turkey) Asrın Rodi Pak	21	14	17	Ret	18	14	Ret	10	10
20	(Spain) Ferran Hernández							7	Ret	9
21	(New Zealand) Connor London	18	18	16	18	13	13	Ret	17	6
22	(New Zealand) Shane Richardson							Ret	11	5
23	(Switzerland) Théo Clerc	17	15	19	12	25	20	16	18	5
24	(France) Antoine Chapeau						12			4
25	(Netherlands) Djim Ulrich		12							4
26	(Italy) Alessandro Zetti	19			13					3
27	(United States) Ashton Yates							18	14	2
28	(Turkey) Furkan Eryılmaz	26	22	22	23	14	Ret	26	24	2
29	(Republic of Ireland) Korie McGreevy			14						2
30	(Italy) Riccardo Picciuto	22	16	20	15	17	21	22	20	1
	(United Kingdom) Charley Oakland	33	Ret	DNS		16	Ret	20	21	0
	(Greece) Nikos Karakostas	24	20	Ret	16	24	24	23	23	0
	(Canada) Stacey Nesbitt	27	Ret	24	17	22	19	21	28	0
	(France) Joseph Foray						18			0
	(Israel) Dean Gopher	29	21	21	20	23	Ret	24	19	0
	(Italy) Stefano Ferrante				19					0
	(United Kingdom) Kade Verwey					20	23	25	22	0
	(South Africa) Zanté Otto					21				0
	(Switzerland) Laura Rodriguez	28	23	23	21					0
	(Estonia) Anastassia Kovalenko	31			22		25	27	26	0
	(Italy) Edoardo Angeloni				24					0
	(Hungary) Viktória Kis	30	24							0
	(Spain) Juan Carlos Cárdenas							Ret	25	0
	(Spain) Félix Periane	25								0
	(Republic of Ireland) Nicole Lynch	32	Ret	Ret	DNQ	27	26	29	27	0
	(United Kingdom) Monica Isaac							28	DNS	0
Pos	Rider	ARA (Spain)	ASS (Netherlands)	DON (United Kingdom)	MIS (Italy)	LAU (Germany)	MAG (France)	JER (Spain)		Pts

Colour	Result
Gold	Winner
Silver	Second place
Bronze	Third place
Green	Points finish
Blue	Non-points finish
Blue	Non-classified finish (NC)
Purple	Retired (Ret)
Red	Did not qualify (DNQ)
Red	Did not pre-qualify (DNPQ)
Black	Disqualified (DSQ)
White	Did not start (DNS)
White	Withdrew (WD)
White	Race cancelled (C)
Blank	Did not practice (DNP)
Blank	Did not arrive (DNA)
Blank	Excluded (EX)

**Bold** – Pole position
Italics – Fastest lap

=== Women's European Cup ===
Pos.	Rider	ARA (Spain)	ASS (Netherlands)	DON (United Kingdom)	MIS (Italy)	LAU (Germany)	MAG (France)	JER (Spain)		Pts
1	(New Zealand) Avalon Biddle	15	11	15	8	15	11	17	15	200
2	(Canada) Stacey Nesbitt	27	Ret	24	17	22	19	21	28	116
3	(Switzerland) Laura Rodriguez	28	23	23	21					72
4	(United Kingdom) Charley Oakland	33	Ret	DNS		16	Ret	20	21	69
5	(Estonia) Anastassia Kovalenko	31			22		25	27	26	69
6	(Republic of Ireland) Nicole Lynch	32	Ret	Ret	DNQ	27	26	29	27	57
7	(Hungary) Viktória Kis	30	24							29
8	(South Africa) Zanté Otto					21				16
9	(United Kingdom) Monica Isaac							28	DNS	11
Pos	Rider	ARA (Spain)	ASS (Netherlands)	DON (United Kingdom)	MIS (Italy)	LAU (Germany)	MAG (France)	JER (Spain)		Pts
