= 2015 European Junior Cup =

2015 European Junior Cup
Previous:	2014	Next:	2016
Support series: Superbike World Championship; Supersport World Championship; FIM Superstock 1000 Cup; European Superstock 600 Championship

The 2015 European Junior Cup was the fifth season of the European Junior Cup. It was contested over eight rounds, starting on 12 April at Motorland Aragón and ending on 4 October at Magny Cours. Starting in 2015 there was a "Women's European Cup" for female riders aged between 14 and 23 years. The upper age limit was also increased to 21 for males.

With five victories, Spanish rider Javier Orellana claimed the championship title with a round to spare, ultimately finishing fifty-six points clear of his next closest competitor, Paolo Grassia of Italy. Grassia prevailed in a three-rider contest for the runner-up position at the final round at Magny-Cours; his fifth-place finish saw him take the position by three points from France's Guillaume Raymond. Both riders finished on the podium three times, but did not claim a victory. Italian duo Emanuele Pusceddu and Giuseppe De Gruttola each won on home soil at Imola and Misano, while Spain's Xavi Pinsach won on a one-off appearance at Jerez.

Six wins from the eight races was enough for New Zealand's Avalon Biddle to win the Women's European Cup – again with a round to spare – by fifty-four points ahead of Anastassia Kovalenko. The only other rider to win was Hungarian rider Viktória Kis, who won back-to-back races at Assen and Imola.

== Entry list ==
No.	Rider	Rounds
3	(United Kingdom) Sam Wilford	All
4	(France) Romain Lecarpentier	8
5	(Canada) Braeden Ortt	3–5
8	(Spain) Mika Pérez	All
9	(Switzerland) Laura Rodriguez	1, 4–8
10	(Finland) Felix Nässi	7
11	(Italy) Riccardo Picciuto	All
12	(South Africa) Byron Bester	7
13	(Mexico) Mario Luján	1
14	(Switzerland) Theo Clerc	8
15	(Italy) Alfonso Coppola	All
18	(South Africa) Themba Khumalo	3–7
19	(United Kingdom) Charlie Oakland	4
20	(Portugal) Dorren Loureiro	All
21	(New Zealand) Avalon Biddle	All
22	(Spain) Joan Uviña	7
24	(Spain) Said Dahan	1
26	(Hungary) Viktória Kis	1–6, 8
27	(France) Guillaume Raymond	All
30	(Italy) Alberto Nicoletti	3
31	(Brazil) Renzo Ferreira	8
34	(United Kingdom) Daniel Drayton	All
35	(United Kingdom) Stefan Hill	All
38	(Estonia) Hannes Soomer	1–7
45	(Greece) Dimitris Karakostas	All
46	(Republic of Ireland) Connall Courtney	8
51	(Italy) Matteo Ciprietti	All
52	(South Africa) Troy Bezuidenhout	All
53	(Spain) Illán Fernández	1–5
54	(Turkey) Harun Çabuk	All
55	(Netherlands) Karlo Slager	1–2
56	(Netherlands) Quentin Koers	2
58	(Italy) Emanuele Pusceddu	1–4, 6–8
59	(France) Dorian Laville	All
69	(United Kingdom) Joshua Harland	1–4, 6–8
72	(Hungary) Bálint Kovács	7
73	(Argentina) Tomás Cassano	All
74	(Netherlands) Jaimie van Sikkelerus	All
77	(France) Bryan Castan	8
80	(Spain) Xavi Pinsach	7
81	(France) Antoine Chapeau	8
84	(Italy) Paolo Grassia	All
85	(Portugal) Pedro Nuno	5
95	(Italy) Giuseppe De Gruttola	All
96	(Spain) Javier Orellana	All
97	(Greece) Nikos Karakostas	1–4, 6–8
99	(Estonia) Anastassia Kovalenko	All

== Race calendar and results ==
Round	Country	Circuit	Date	Pole position	Fastest lap	Winning rider
1	Spain	Motorland Aragón	12 April	(Spain) Mika Pérez	(Italy) Matteo Ciprietti	(Spain) Javier Orellana
2	Netherlands	TT Circuit Assen	19 April	(Estonia) Hannes Soomer	(France) Dorian Laville	(Spain) Javier Orellana
3	Italy	Autodromo Enzo e Dino Ferrari	10 May	(Italy) Emanuele Pusceddu	(Italy) Emanuele Pusceddu	(Italy) Emanuele Pusceddu
4	United Kingdom	Donington Park	24 May	(Spain) Mika Pérez	(Spain) Javier Orellana	(Spain) Javier Orellana
5	Portugal	Algarve International Circuit	7 June	(United Kingdom) Sam Wilford	(Portugal) Pedro Nuno	(Spain) Javier Orellana
6	Italy	Misano Circuit	21 June	(Spain) Javier Orellana	(Spain) Mika Pérez	(Italy) Giuseppe De Gruttola
7	Spain	Circuito de Jerez	20 September	(Spain) Xavi Pinsach	(Italy) Emanuele Pusceddu	(Spain) Xavi Pinsach
8	France	Circuit de Nevers Magny-Cours	4 October	(France) Guillaume Raymond	(Italy) Alfonso Coppola	(Spain) Javier Orellana

== Championship standings ==
=== Riders' championship ===
Pos.	Rider	ARA (Spain)	ASS (Netherlands)	IMO (Italy)	DON (United Kingdom)	POR (Portugal)	MIS (Italy)	JER (Spain)	MAG (France)	Pts
1	(Spain) Javier Orellana	1	1	3	1	1	**Ret**	3	1	157
2	(Italy) Paolo Grassia	2	8	2	3	20	4	4	5	101
3	(France) Guillaume Raymond	7	4	5	2	4	3	Ret	**3**	98
4	(Italy) Emanuele Pusceddu	3	3	**1**	Ret		Ret	2	4	90
5	(France) Dorian Laville	10	5	6	4	7	6	Ret	2	79
6	(Italy) Giuseppe De Gruttola	11	10	4	Ret	Ret	1	5	Ret	60
7	(Estonia) Hannes Soomer	5	**2**	Ret	10	5	5	DNS		59
8	(United Kingdom) Sam Wilford	Ret	14	10	5	**2**	12	7	10	58
9	(Italy) Alfonso Coppola	9	11	8	7	8	2	DNS	Ret	57
10	(Turkey) Harun Çabuk	Ret	16	9	11	9	7	6	8	46
11	(Italy) Matteo Ciprietti	6	6	Ret	9	Ret	Ret	8	9	42
12	(United Kingdom) Stefan Hill	14	12	12	12	10	Ret	9	7	36
13	(Spain) Illán Fernández	8	Ret	7	8	6				35
14	(Portugal) Dorren Loureiro	24	9	Ret	6	12	9	Ret	Ret	28
15	(Spain) Xavi Pinsach							**1**		25
16	(South Africa) Troy Bezuidenhout	17	15	14	15	11	10	10	12	25
17	(Netherlands) Jaimie van Sikkelerus	12	13	Ret	13	13	11	14	11	25
18	(Spain) Mika Pérez	**4**	Ret	Ret	**Ret**	Ret	Ret	Ret	6	23
19	(United Kingdom) Joshua Harland	16	7	11	Ret		8	DNS	Ret	22
20	(Portugal) Pedro Nuno					3				16
21	(Argentina) Tomás Cassano	Ret	17	13	16	15	13	11	16	12
22	(South Africa) Themba Khumalo			Ret	18	14	14	12		8
23	(New Zealand) Avalon Biddle	13	24	Ret	19	16	15	19	19	4
24	(France) Romain Lecarpentier								13	3
25	(South Africa) Byron Bester							13		3
26	(France) Bryan Castan								14	2
27	(Canada) Braeden Ortt			16	14	Ret				2
28	(Greece) Dimitris Karakostas	18	18	15	21	19	16	16	15	2
29	(United Kingdom) Daniel Drayton	19	20	17	17	18	17	15	Ret	1
30	(Spain) Said Dahan	15								1
	(Switzerland) Theo Clerc								17	0
	(Finland) Felix Nässi							17		0
	(Italy) Riccardo Picciuto	20	25	Ret	23	17	Ret	18	23	0
	(France) Antoine Chapeau								18	0
	(Greece) Nikos Karakostas	23	22	20	24		18	20	20	0
	(Italy) Alberto Nicoletti			18						0
	(Switzerland) Laura Rodriguez	22			25	22	19	22	21	0
	(Hungary) Viktória Kis	Ret	21	19	22	21	Ret		Ret	0
	(Netherlands) Quentin Koers		19							0
	(Estonia) Anastassia Kovalenko	21	23	Ret	26	23	20	23	24	0
	(United Kingdom) Charlie Oakland				20					0
	(Hungary) Bálint Kovács							21		0
	(Brazil) Renzo Ferreira								22	0
	(Netherlands) Karlo Slager	Ret	Ret							0
	(Republic of Ireland) Connall Courtney								Ret	0
	(Mexico) Mario Luján	Ret								0
	(Spain) Joan Uviña							DNS		0
Pos	Rider	ARA (Spain)	ASS (Netherlands)	IMO (Italy)	DON (United Kingdom)	POR (Portugal)	MIS (Italy)	JER (Spain)	MAG (France)	Pts

Colour	Result
Gold	Winner
Silver	Second place
Bronze	Third place
Green	Points finish
Blue	Non-points finish
Blue	Non-classified finish (NC)
Purple	Retired (Ret)
Red	Did not qualify (DNQ)
Red	Did not pre-qualify (DNPQ)
Black	Disqualified (DSQ)
White	Did not start (DNS)
White	Withdrew (WD)
White	Race cancelled (C)
Blank	Did not practice (DNP)
Blank	Did not arrive (DNA)
Blank	Excluded (EX)

**Bold** – Pole position
Italics – Fastest lap

=== Women's European Cup ===
Pos.	Rider	ARA (Spain)	ASS (Netherlands)	IMO (Italy)	DON (United Kingdom)	POR (Portugal)	MIS (Italy)	JER (Spain)	MAG (France)	Pts
1	(New Zealand) Avalon Biddle	13	24	Ret	19	16	15	19	19	166
2	(Estonia) Anastassia Kovalenko	21	23	Ret	26	23	20	23	24	112
3	(Switzerland) Laura Rodriguez	22			25	22	19	22	21	105
4	(Hungary) Viktória Kis	Ret	21	19	22	21	Ret		Ret	86
5	(United Kingdom) Charlie Oakland				20					20
Pos	Rider	ARA (Spain)	ASS (Netherlands)	IMO (Italy)	DON (United Kingdom)	POR (Portugal)	MIS (Italy)	JER (Spain)	MAG (France)	Pts
