= Armando Pontone =

Italian motorcycle racer

- Nationality: Italian
- Born: 3 July 1992 (age 34); Pontecorvo, Italy
Motorcycle racing career statistics
Moto3 World Championship
Active years	2012
Manufacturers	Ioda
Championships	0
2012 championship position	NC (0 pts)
Starts / Wins / Podiums / Poles / F. laps / Points; 8 / 0 / 0 / 0 / 0 / 0
125cc World Championship
Active years	2010
Manufacturers	Aprilia
Championships	0
2010 championship position	NC (0 pts)
Starts / Wins / Podiums / Poles / F. laps / Points; 2 / 0 / 0 / 0 / 0 / 0
MotoE World Championship
Active years	2024
Manufacturers	Ducati
2024 championship position	18th (23 pts)
Starts / Wins / Podiums / Poles / F. laps / Points; 16 / 0 / 0 / 0 / 0 / 23
Supersport World Championship
Active years	2021
Manufacturers	Yamaha
Championships	0
2021 championship position	NC (0 pts)
Starts / Wins / Podiums / Poles / F. laps / Points; 2 / 0 / 0 / 0 / 0 / 0
Supersport 300 World Championship
Active years	2017
Manufacturers	Yamaha
Championships	0
2017 championship position	11th (41 pts)
Starts / Wins / Podiums / Poles / F. laps / Points; 9 / 0 / 1 / 0 / 1 / 41

Armando Pontone (born 3 July 1992 in Pontecorvo) is an Italian motorcycle racer. He has competed in the 125cc World Championship, the Moto3 World Championship, the Supersport 300 World Championship and the Supersport World Championship. He won the CIV Moto3 Challenge in 2011, and the Italian Honda NSF250R Trophy in 2014.

== Career statistics ==
=== Career highlights ===
- 2018 - NC, European Superstock 1000 Championship, Yamaha YZF-R1

=== Grand Prix motorcycle racing ===
==== By season ====
Season	Class	Motorcycle	Team	Race	Win	Podium	Pole	FLap	Pts	Plcd
2010	125cc	Aprilia	Junior GP Racing Team FMI; Junior GP FMI	2	0	0	0	0	0	NC
2012	Moto3	Ioda	IodaRacing Project; Ioda Team Italia	8	0	0	0	0	0	NC
2024	MotoE	Ducati	Aruba Cloud MotoE Racing Team	16	0	0	0	0	23	18th
Total				**26**	**0**	**0**	**0**	**0**	**23**	

==== Races by year ====
(key) (Races in bold indicate pole position; races in italics indicate fastest lap)

Year	Class	Bike	1	2	3	4	5	6	7	8	9	10	11	12	13	14	15	16	17	Pos	Pts
2010	125cc	Aprilia	QAT	SPA	FRA	ITA; 20	GBR	NED	CAT	GER	CZE	INP	RSM; 18	ARA	JPN	MAL	AUS	POR	VAL	NC	0
2012	Moto3	Ioda	QAT	SPA	POR; NC	FRA	CAT	GBR	NED	GER	ITA	INP; 19	CZE; 28	RSM; Ret	ARA; 27	JPN; DNS	MAL; 28	AUS; 18	VAL; 24	NC	0
2024	MotoE	Ducati	POR1; 10	POR2; 16	FRA1; 12	FRA2; Ret	CAT1; 14	CAT2; 15	ITA1; 16	ITA2; 15	NED1; 12	NED2; 16	GER1; Ret	GER2; 12	AUT1; 15	AUT2; 16	RSM1; 16	RSM2; 16		18th	23

=== Supersport World Championship ===
==== Races by year ====
(key) (Races in bold indicate pole position; races in italics indicate fastest lap)

Year	Bike	1	2	3	4	5	6	7	8	9	10	11	12	13	14	15	16	17	18	19	20	21	22	23	24	Pos	Pts
2021	Yamaha	SPA	SPA	POR	POR	ITA; 21	ITA; 17	NED	NED	CZE	CZE	SPA	SPA	FRA	FRA	SPA	SPA	SPA	SPA	POR	POR	ARG	ARG	INA	INA	NC	0

=== Supersport 300 World Championship ===
==== Races by year ====
(key)

Year	Bike	1	2	3	4	5	6	7	8	9	Pos	Pts
2017	Yamaha	SPA; 15	NED; 15	ITA; 21	GBR; 4	ITA; 2	GER; 10	POR; 19	FRA; 28	SPA; 16	11th	41

=== European Superstock 1000 Championship ===
==== Races by year ====
(key) (Races in bold indicate pole position) (Races in italics indicate fastest lap)

Year	Bike	1	2	3	4	5	6	7	8	Pos	Pts
2018	Yamaha	ARA	NED	IMO; 17	DON	BRN	MIS; 19	ALG	MAG	NC	0
