= Alex Murley =

British motorcycle racer

- Nationality: British
- Born: 20 June 1999 (age 27); Solihull, West Midlands, England
Motorcycle racing career statistics
Supersport World Championship
Active years	2018
Starts / Wins / Podiums / Poles / F. laps / Points; 4 / 0 / 0 / 0 / 0 / 0

Alex Murley (born 20 June 1999) is an English motorcycle racer. He formerly competed in the Superbike World Championship.

Murley is the 2014 and 2015 Kawasaki Junior Cup champion.

== Career statistics ==
=== European Junior Cup ===
==== Races by year ====
(key) (Races in bold indicate pole position; races in italics indicate fastest lap)

Year	Bike	1	2	3	4	5	6	7	8	Pos	Pts
2016	Honda	ARA; 12	ASS; 13	DON; 11	MIS; Ret	LAU; Ret	MAG; 10	JER1; 13	JER2; 13	14th	24

=== Supersport 300 World Championship ===
==== Races by year ====
(key)

Year	Bike	1	2	3	4	5	6	7	8	9	Pos	Pts	Ref
2017	Yamaha	ARA; 13	ASS; 10	IMO; 15	DON; 10	MIS; 11	LAU; Ret	POR; 15	MAG; 12	JER; 32	13th	26	
2018	Yamaha	ARA; 23	ASS; 17	IMO; Ret	DON; Ret	BRN	MIS	POR	MAG		NC	0	

=== Supersport World Championship ===
==== Races by year ====
(key) (Races in bold indicate pole position; races in italics indicate fastest lap)

Year	Bike	1	2	3	4	5	6	7	8	9	10	11	12	Pos	Pts	Ref
2018	Honda	AUS	THA	SPA	NED	ITA	GBR	CZE	ITA	POR; Ret	FRA; 26	ARG; 19	QAT; 16	NC	0	
