= European Junior Cup =

- Sport: Motorcycle sport
- Founded: 2011
- Folded: 2016
- Country: Europe
- Last champion: Mika Pérez

The European Junior Cup was a motorcycling series held as a support series for the European rounds of the Superbike World Championship, hence the title. It was open to riders aged between 14–19; for 2015 the upper limit was increased to 21 for males and 23 for females, who also competed for a Women's European Cup; for 2016 the age limit for female riders was 24.

The first season was run with Kawasaki Ninja 250R bikes, before they switched to KTM 690 Duke for 2012 and to Honda CBR500R from 2013 to 2014; the 2015 and 2016 bike was the Honda CBR650F.

The series was closed after the 2016 season, as the Supersport 300 World Championship was announced as the new entry class to be introduced in World Superbike events for 2017.

== Champions ==
Season	Champion	Bike
2011	(Australia) Matt Davies	Kawasaki
2012	(Austria) Lukas Wimmer	KTM
2013	(New Zealand) Jake Lewis	Honda
2014	(Spain) Augusto Fernández	Honda
2015	(Spain) Javier Orellana	Honda
2016	(Spain) Mika Pérez	Honda

=== Women's European Cup ===
Season	Champion	Bike
2015	(New Zealand) Avalon Biddle	Honda
2016	(New Zealand) Avalon Biddle	Honda
