= Anastassia Kovalenko-Kõlvart =

Estonian motorcycle racer (born 1991)

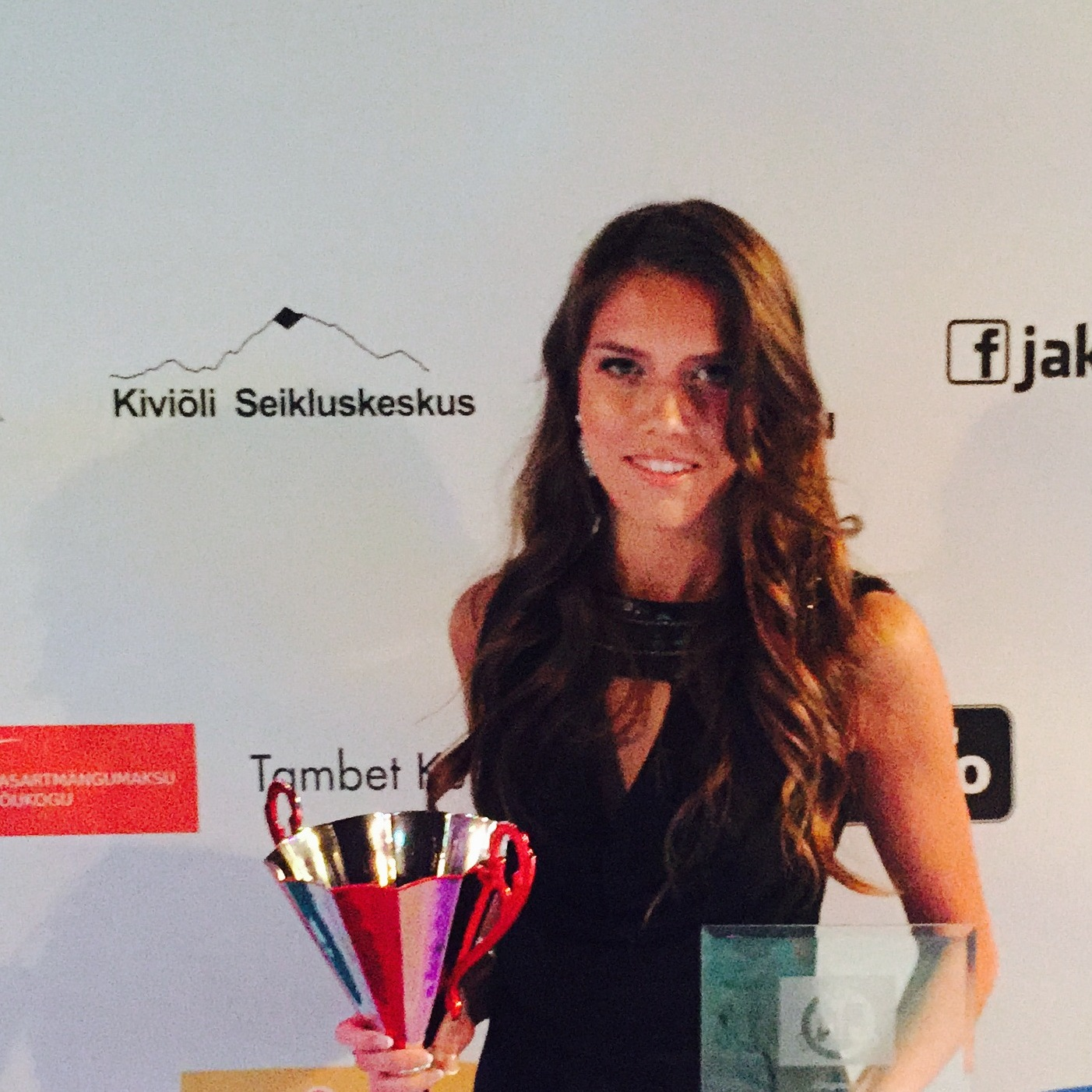

Anastassia Kovalenko-Kõlvart (born 21 September 1991) is an Estonian motorcycle road racer and politician. She raced in the European Junior Cup and is the first female racer in Estonian road racing history to race on the international level. She currently holds the title of the best female motorcycle athlete of the year in Estonia. She has been a member of Tallinn city council and has been a member of the Riigikogu for the Estonian Centre Party since 2022.

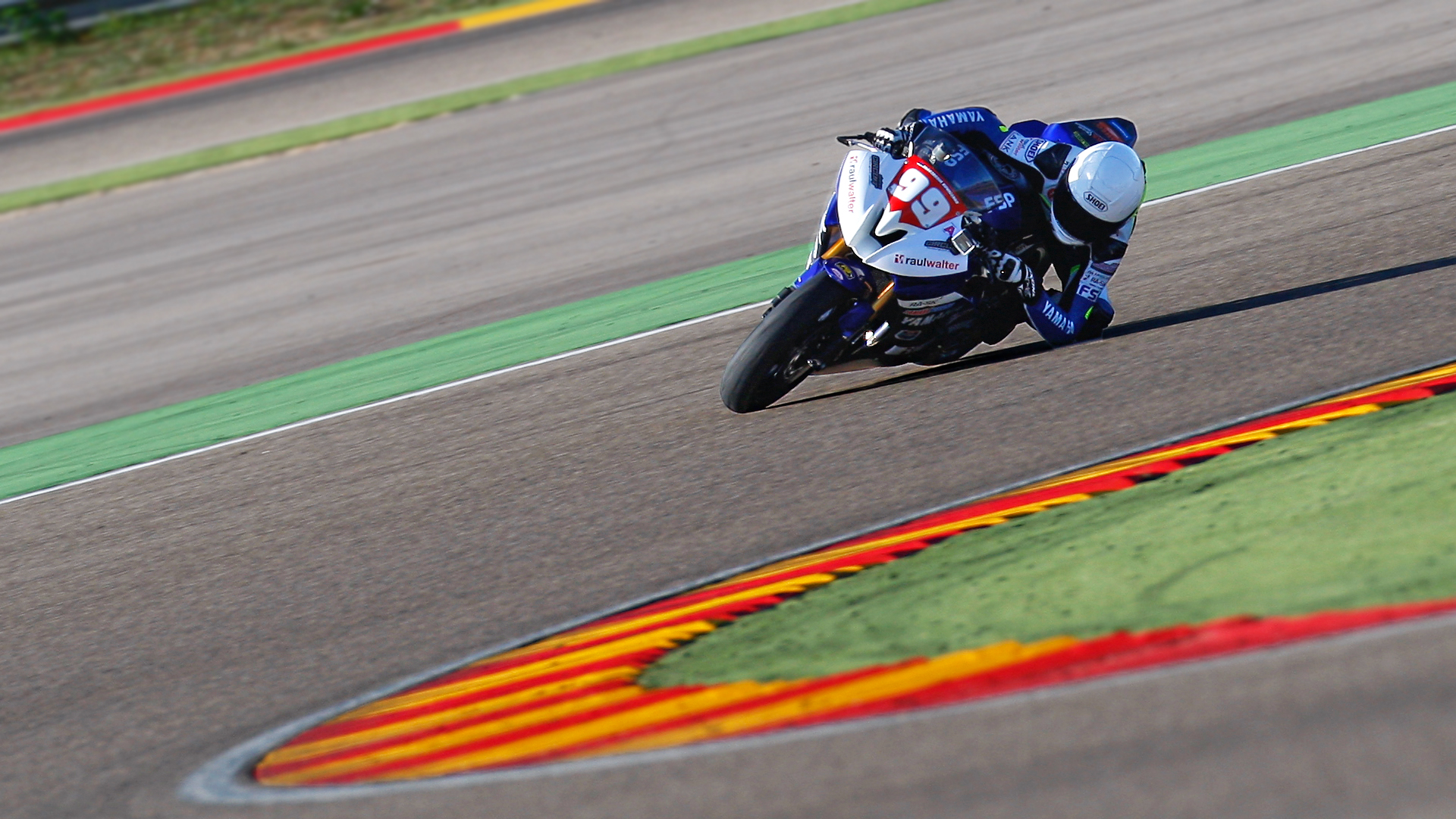
Training day in Aragon on the 31st of March.

== Racing career ==
Kovalenko has been racing motorcycles since 2012 when she was riding a Kawasaki Ninja 250R. In 2013, she moved on to a more powerful bike – Kawasaki Ninja 600R. On the same year she decided to compete in two classes which was not an easy decision. She managed to achieve second place in Superstock 600 B class and third position in C-class. As of 2014, Kovalenko started to ride under Finnish road racing team Kallio Racing Team (owned by MotoGP rider Mika Kallio) where she competed in both Estonian and Finnish championships. Kovalenko won the Superstock 600 B class championship in Estonia in 2014, despite crashing mid-season which ended up with a broken collarbone, and was awarded with the title of the best female motorcycle athlete of the year. In 2015, Kovalenko started to race in European Junior Cup, scoring points in both EJC and the Women's cup. Kovalenko finished Women's European Cup in second position. On the same year, Kovalenko was awarded with the award for the most remarkable moment of the year in motorsports in Estonia. In 2016, Kovalenko started to train with Jorge Lorenzo's father.

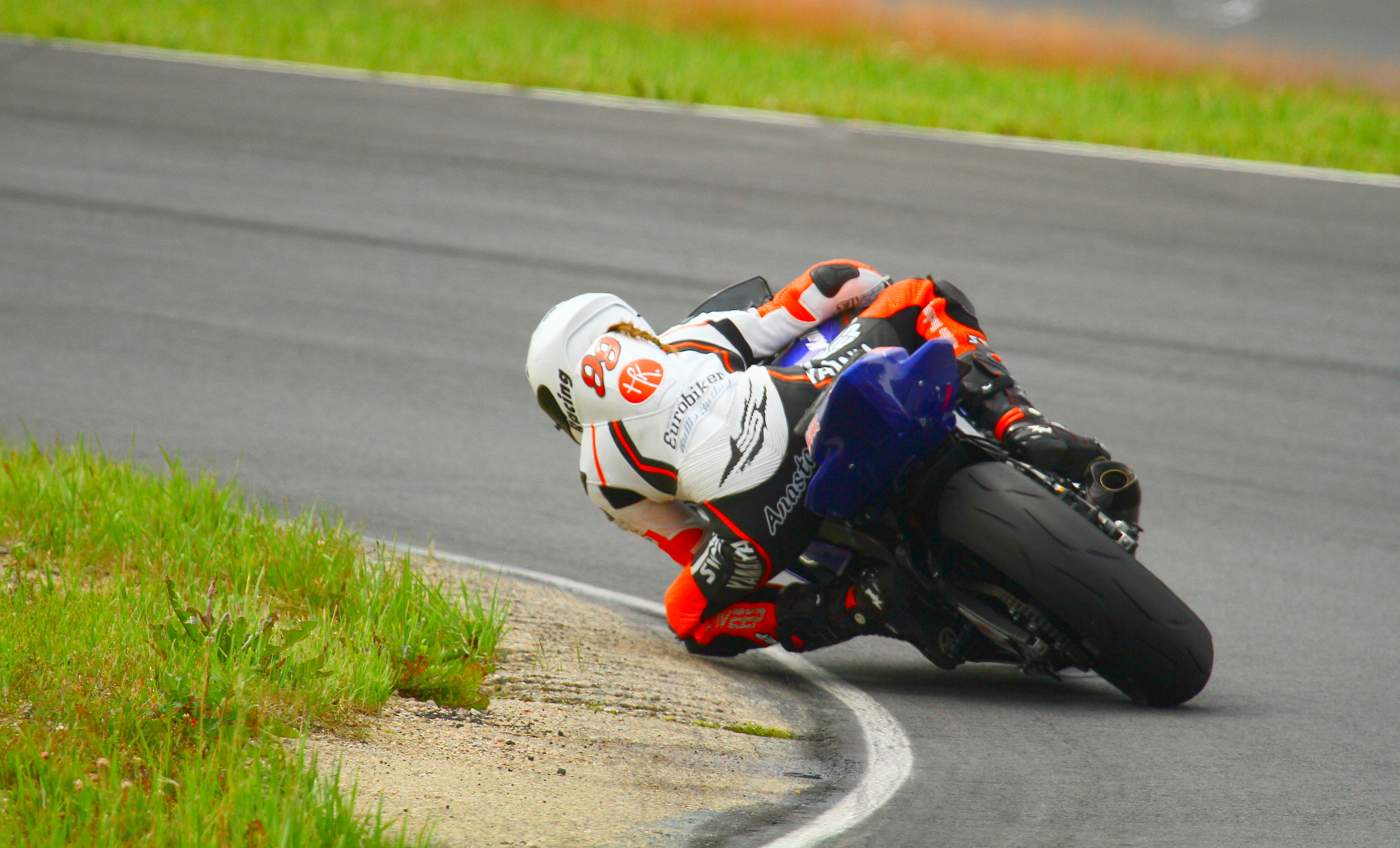
Anastassia Kovalenko on Botniaring

=== Awards ===
- Best female motorcycle athlete in 2016 (Estonia)
- Women's European Cup 2016 4th place
- Women's European Cup 2015 2nd place
- Award for the most remarkable moment of the year in motorsports (Estonia)
- Best female motorcycle athlete in 2014 (Estonia)
- Winner of B600 cup in 2014
- B600 2nd place in 2013
- C-class 3rd place in 2013

== Career statistics in motorsport ==
=== Career highlights ===
- 2015 - NC, European Junior Cup, Honda CBR500R
- 2016 - NC, European Junior Cup, Honda CBR650F

== Career in law ==
Kovalenko studied in Tallinn French School. After finishing it she proceeded to acquire her bachelor's degree in law in the University of Tartu. During her studies there she also completed the summer law school program at the University of Cambridge. In 2013, she acquired her BA degree and on the same year went on to acquire her master's degree in law in University of Tartu. She was specializing primarily in the field of white-collar crime. Her master's degree thesis analyzed the prosecution of money laundering and its predicate offences. After getting her master's degree in law in 2015, Kovalenko continued her studies in MBA. In 2017 Kovalenko obtained her second master's degree. During undergraduate studies Kovalenko worked in one of the leading law offices in Estonia named Sorainen in dispute resolution team (1 month).

== Career in politics ==
She was a member of the Social Democratic Party between 2017 and 2020 and has been representing the Centre Party since 2021. She was a member of the Tallinn city council and has been a member of the Riigikogu since 2022.

== Personal life ==
Kovalenko was born in Tallinn, Estonia. She has two younger brothers and three younger sisters as well as three older stepsiblings from her father. She married politician Mihhail Kõlvart, at the time Mayor of Tallinn, in 2022.

== Publications ==
- "Millisesse Euroopa föderatsiooni?" 08.04.2013, Postimees
