= Taz Taylor (motorcyclist) =

British motorcycle racer

- Nationality: English
- Born: 21 January 1998 (age 28); United Kingdom
- Current team: GAcompetition
- Bike number: 6
Motorcycle racing career statistics
Moto3 World Championship
Active years	2015
Manufacturers	KTM
Championships	0
2015 championship position	NC (0 pts)
Starts / Wins / Podiums / Poles / F. laps / Points; 1 / 0 / 0 / 0 / 0 / 0
Supersport 300 World Championship
Active years	2017
Manufacturers	Kawasaki
Championships	0
2017 championship position	NC (0 pts)
Starts / Wins / Podiums / Poles / F. laps / Points; 2 / 0 / 0 / 0 / 0 / 0

Taryn Lewis 'Taz' Taylor (born 21 January 1998 in Mansfield, Nottinghamshire) is a British former Grand Prix motorcycle racer as a result of participating in the Moto3 event as a Wildcard ride at the 2015 British Grand Prix at Silverstone.

Taylor now races in the British MotoStar Championship aboard a KTM RC 250 GP.

== Career statistics ==
=== FIM CEV Moto3 Junior World Championship ===
==== Races by year ====
(key) (Races in bold indicate pole position, races in italics indicate fastest lap)

Year	Bike	1	2	3	4	5	6	7	8	9	10	11	12	Pos	Pts
2016	FTR KTM	VAL1	VAL2	LMS	ARA	CAT1	CAT2	ALB	ALG	JER1	JER2	VAL1; 18	VAL2; Ret	NC	0

=== Grand Prix motorcycle racing ===
==== By season ====
Season	Class	Motorcycle	Team	Race	Win	Podium	Pole	FLap	Pts	Plcd
2015	Moto3	KTM	RS Racing	1	0	0	0	0	0	NC
Total				**1**	**0**	**0**	**0**	**0**	**0**	

==== Races by year ====
Yr	Class	Bike	1	2	3	4	5	6	7	8	9	10	11	12	13	14	15	16	17	18	Pos	Pts
2015	Moto3	KTM	QAT	AME	ARG	SPA	FRA	ITA	CAT	NED	GER	INP	CZE	GBR; 19	RSM	ARA	JPN	AUS	MAL	VAL	NC	0

=== Supersport 300 World Championship ===
==== Races by year ====
(key) (Races in bold indicate pole position; races in italics indicate fastest lap)

Year	Bike	1	2	3	4	5	6	7	8	9	Pos	Pts
2017	Kawasaki	ARA	ASS	IMO	DON	MIS	LAU	POR; 22	MAG; 16	JER	NC	0
