= Honda 500 twins =

CB500F
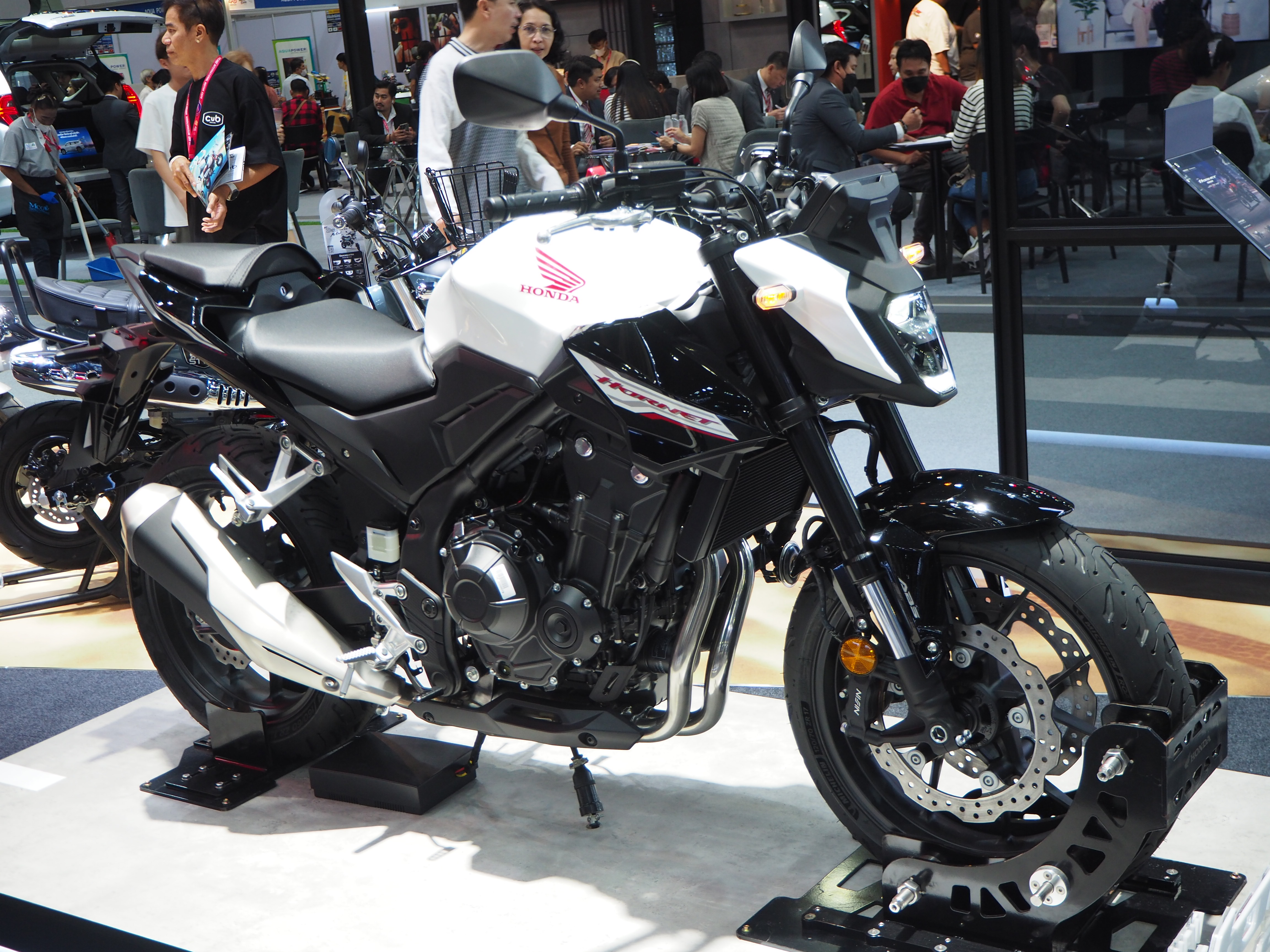
- 2023 CB500 Hornet
- Manufacturer: Honda
- Production: 2013–present
- Assembly: Samut Prakan, Thailand; Manaus, Brazil
- Predecessor: CBF500
- Class: Standard
- Engine: 471 cc (28.7 cu in) liquid-cooled 4-stroke 8-valve DOHC Straight-twin engine
- Bore / stroke: 67 mm × 66.8 mm (2.64 in × 2.63 in)
- Compression ratio: 10.7:1
- Power: 47bhp
- Transmission: 6-speed, wet multi-plate clutch, manual, chain drive

CBR500R
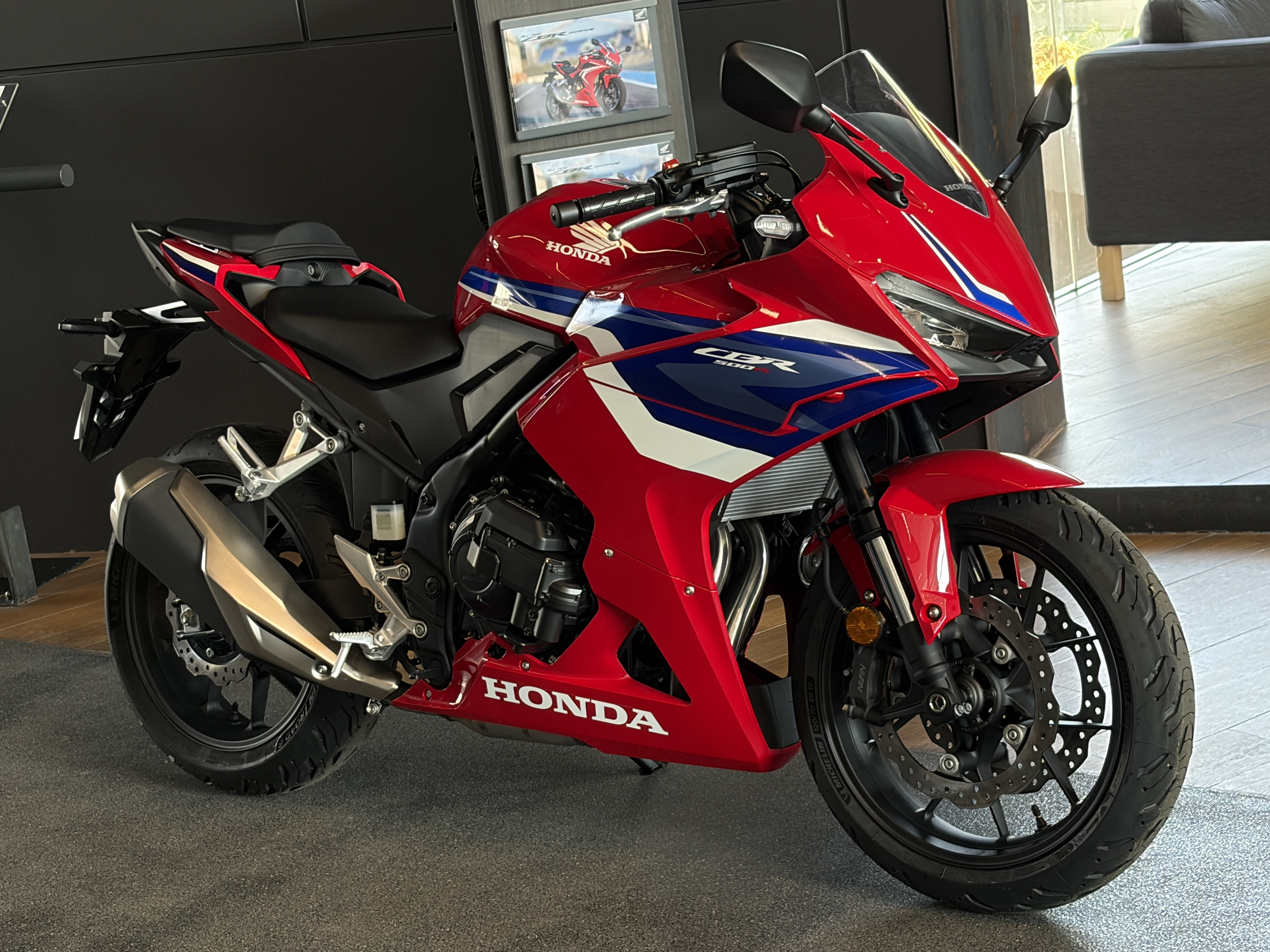
- 2026 CBR500R
- Manufacturer: Honda
- Production: 2013–Present
- Assembly: Samut Prakan, Thailand; Manaus, Brazil (2013-2018)
- Class: Sport bike

CB500X
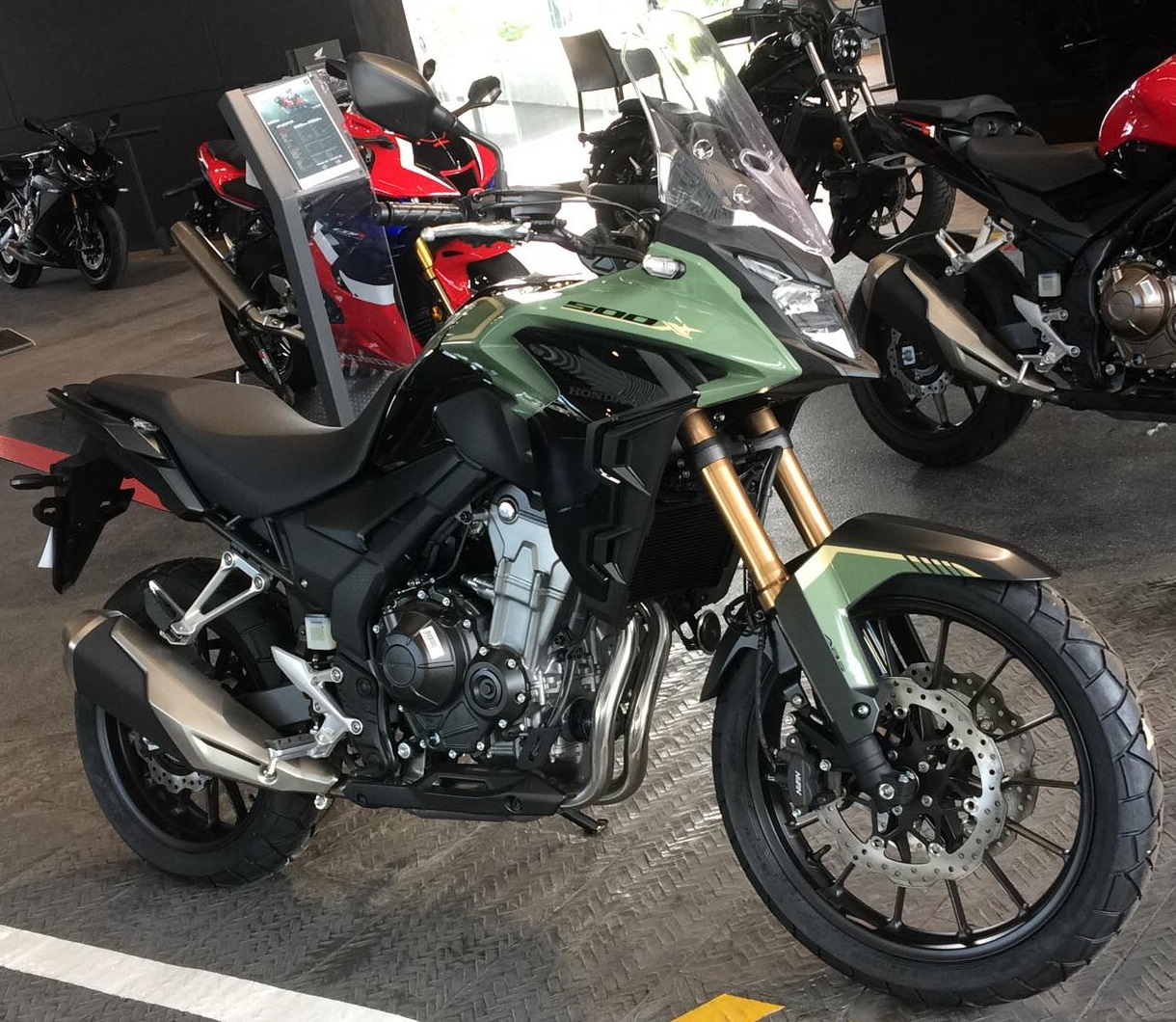
- 2022 CB500X in Pearl Organic Green colorway
- Manufacturer: Honda
- Production: 2013–present
- Assembly: Samut Prakan, Thailand; Manaus, Brazil
- Class: Adventure

The 500 twins are a group of straight-twin motorcycles made by Honda since 2013 which use the same 471 cc (28.7 cu in), 180° crank, straight-twin engine, such as the:

- CB500F / CB500 Hornet naked bike (2013–present)
- CB500X / NX500 adventure touring bike (2013–present)
- CBR500R sport bike (2013–present)
- CMX500 Rebel bobber (2017–present)
- SCL500/CL500 standard, "Scrambler-style" bike (2023–present)

These models are sold in Japan with smaller capacity 399 cc engines: CB400F (2013–2016), CB400X, and CBR400R. Their introduction coincided with new European licensing regulations establishing a mid-range class of motorcycles of limited power. The new 500 twins are similar to the earlier CB500 parallel-twins discontinued in 2003, but all-new from the ground up. They are made in Thailand, where Honda had previously made only smaller displacement motorcycles.

All models use the same 471 cc (28.7 cu in) 180° crank straight-twin engine with capacity and power below the A2 European driving licence limit. They share the same six-speed gearbox and the majority of cycle parts. The CB500X has a larger fuel tank and longer front suspension travel making it taller, and with more ground clearance.

On its release, the CBR500R was the one-design model the European Junior Cup in 2013 and 2014. Since 2014, Honda has partnered with local organisers to promote national CBR500R Cup events in Brazil and France; raced over various circuits, the competitions are open to amateurs from 13-years upwards.

== Model history ==
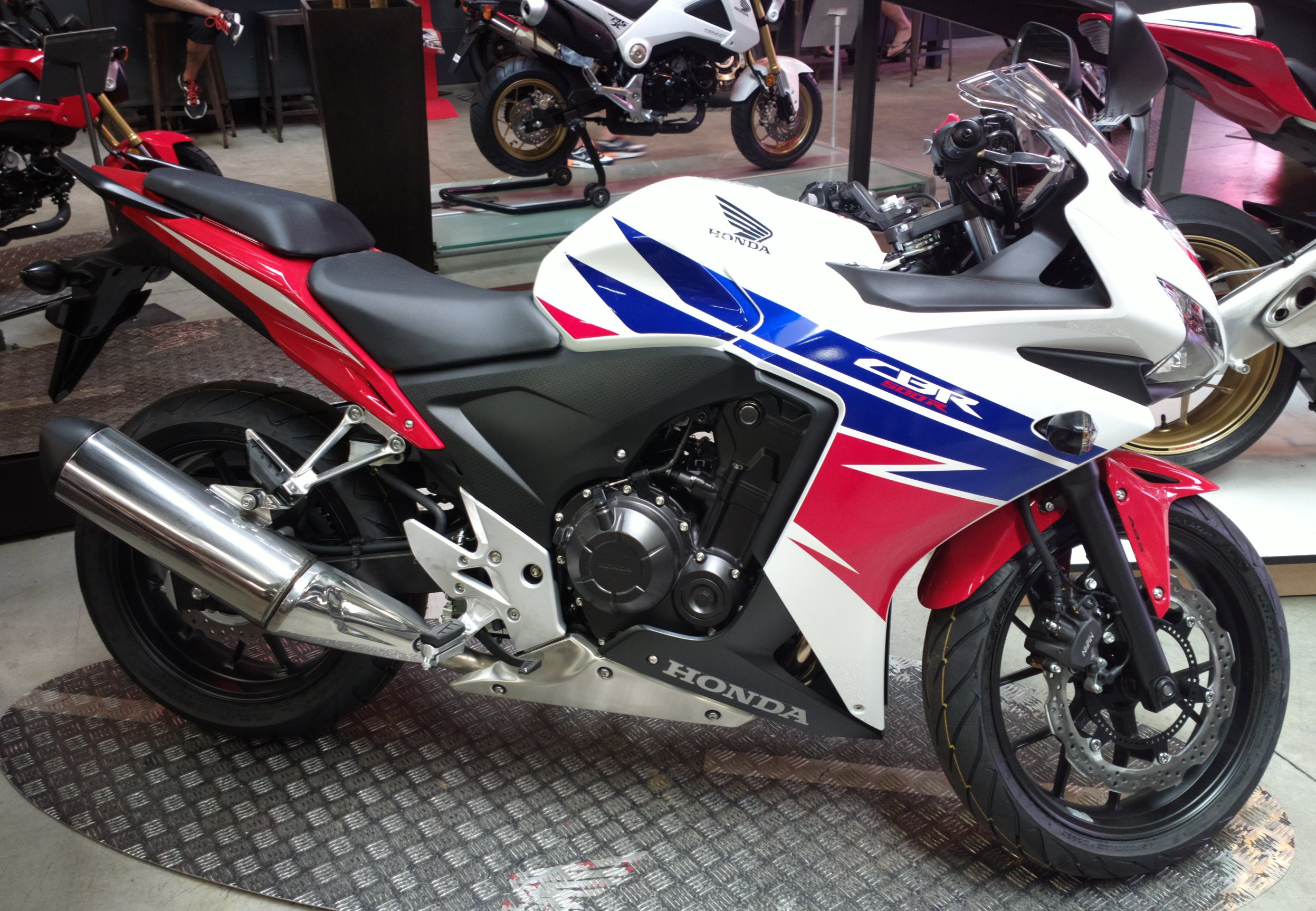
2014 CBR500R

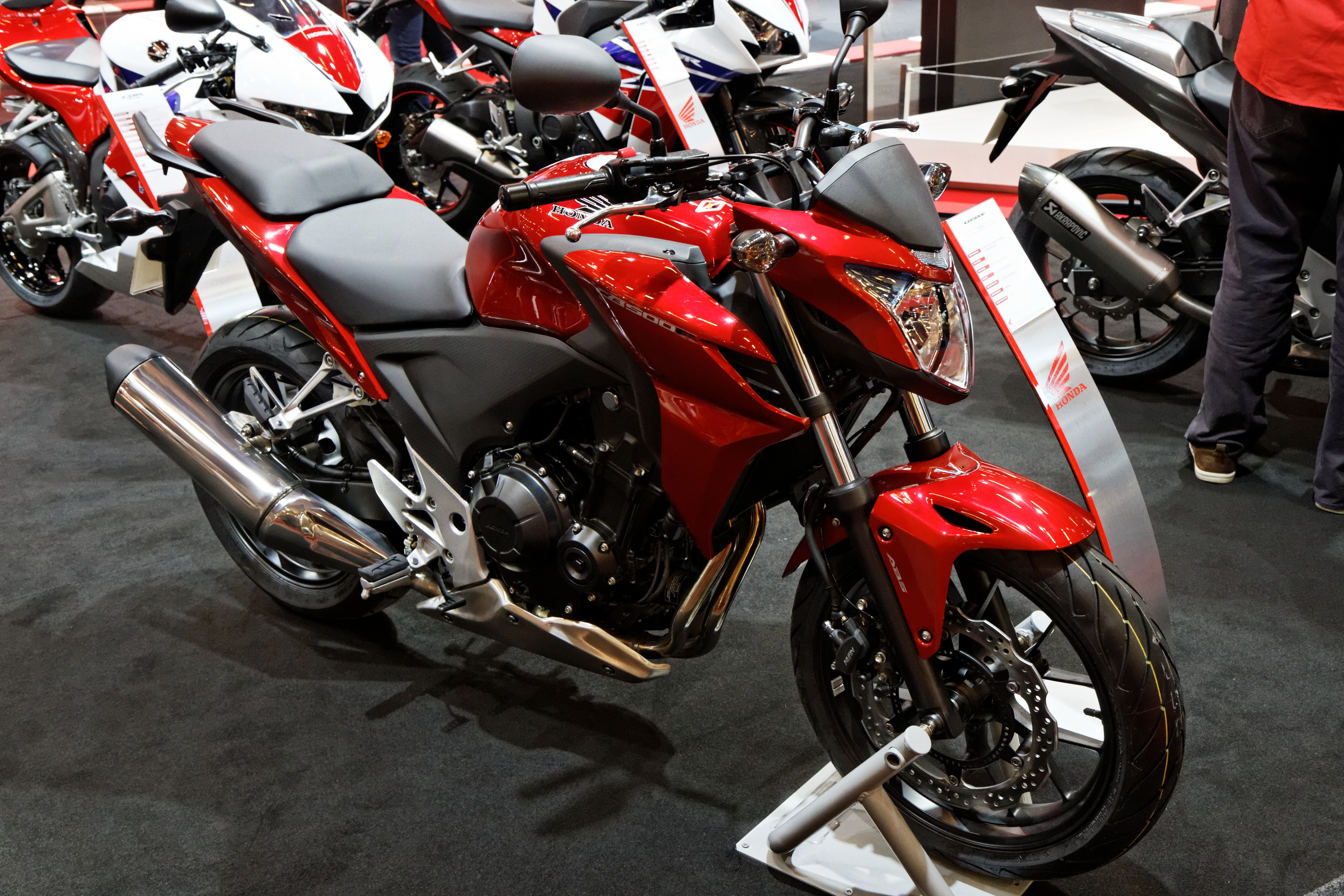
2013 CB500F

The three models were announced on the eve of the November 2012 EICMA show in Milan.

=== 2013 ===
April: CB500F, CBR500R released; July: CB500X released

=== 2016 ===
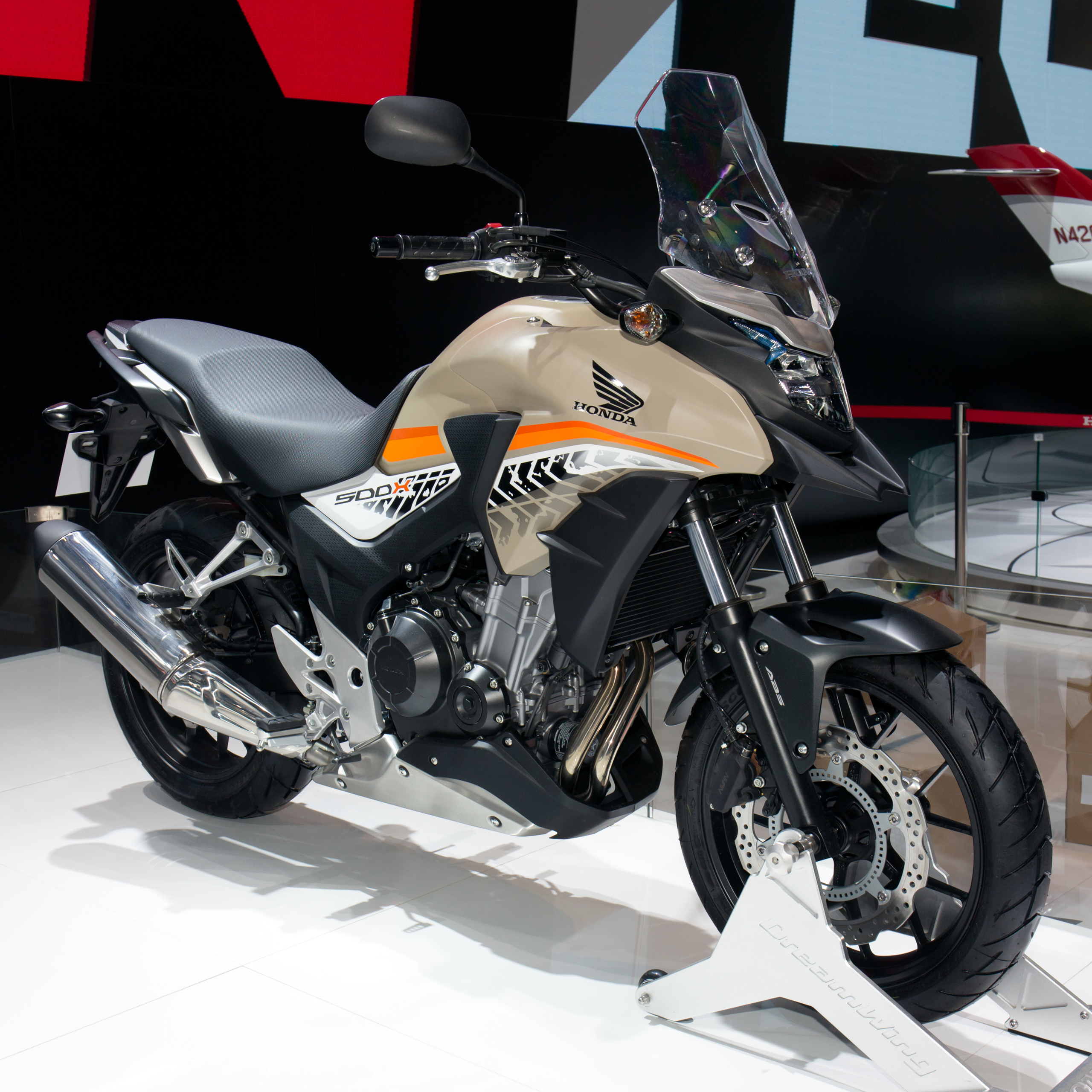
2016 CB500X

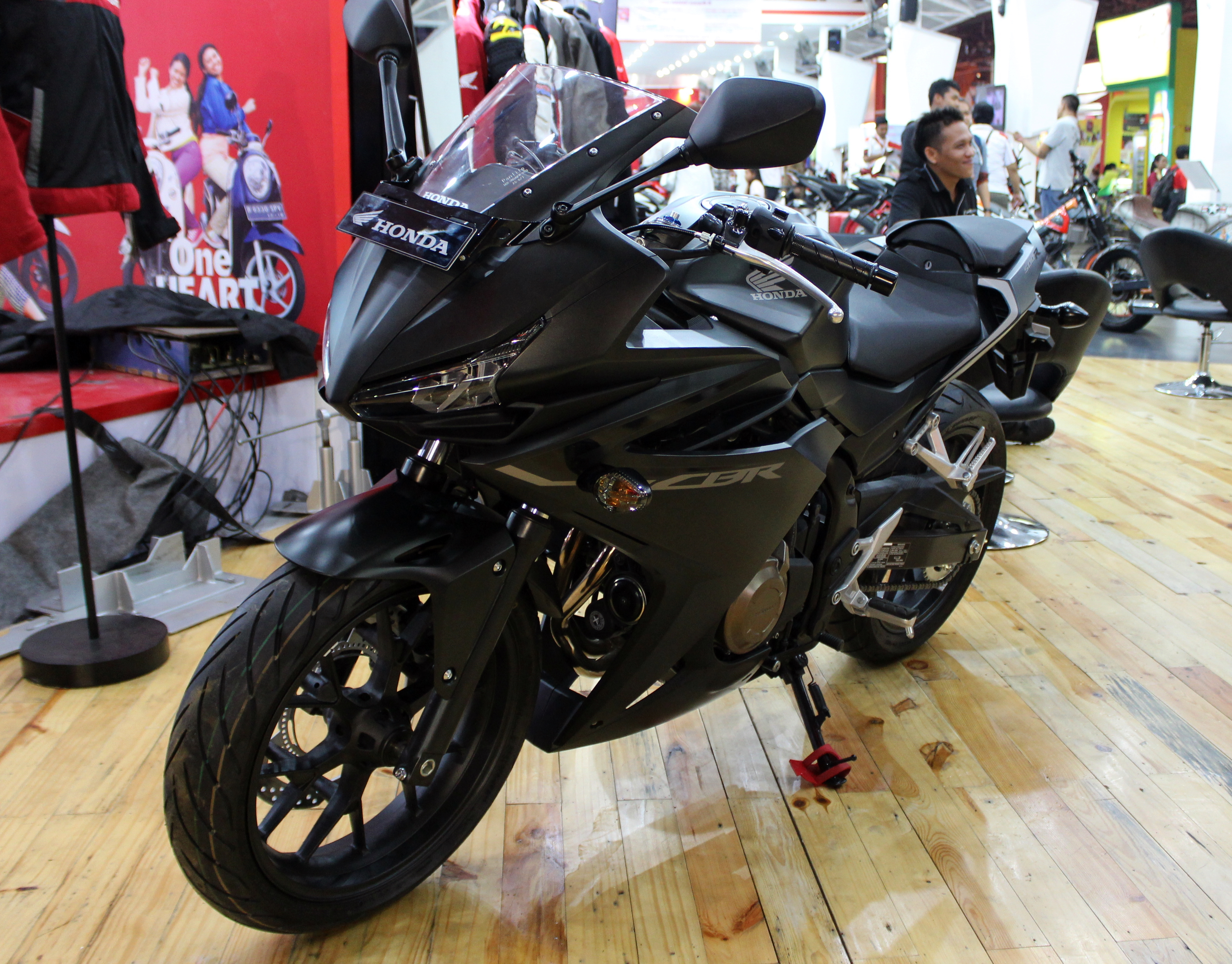
2016 Honda CBR500R

EURO 4 compliance with smaller exhaust, LED headlamp, preload adjustable front suspension, smaller side covers, larger fuel tank on CB500F and CBR500R, Fireblade style fairing on the CBR500R

=== 2019 ===
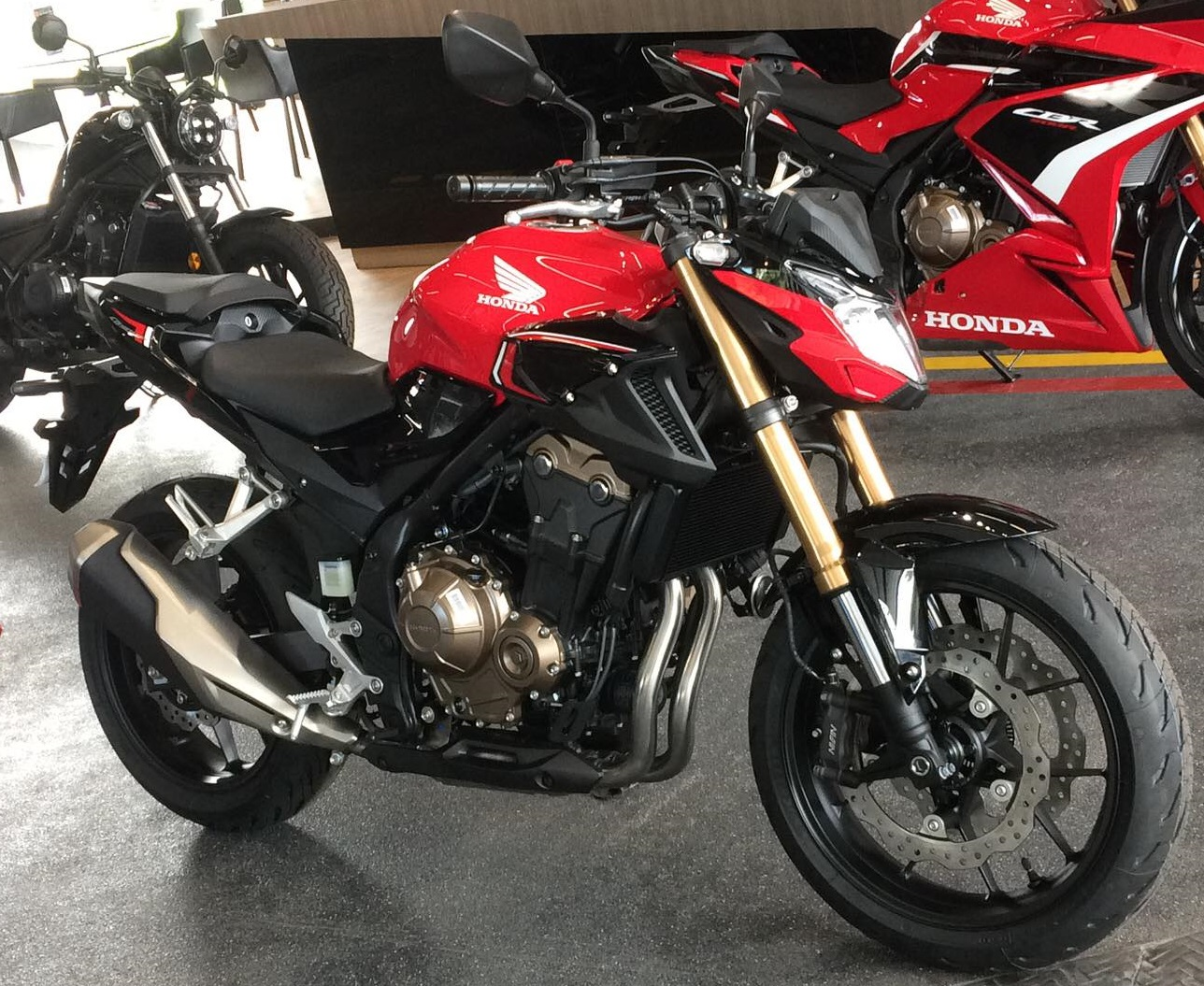
CB500F 2021

Revised exhaust system, anti-rebound clutch, full LED lighting, revised rear shocks, new LCD instrumentation with additional features, 19" front wheel on the ruggedized CB500X, dual-channel ABS standard on all models in most markets, although for 2017 USA models, it remained an option.

=== 2022 ===
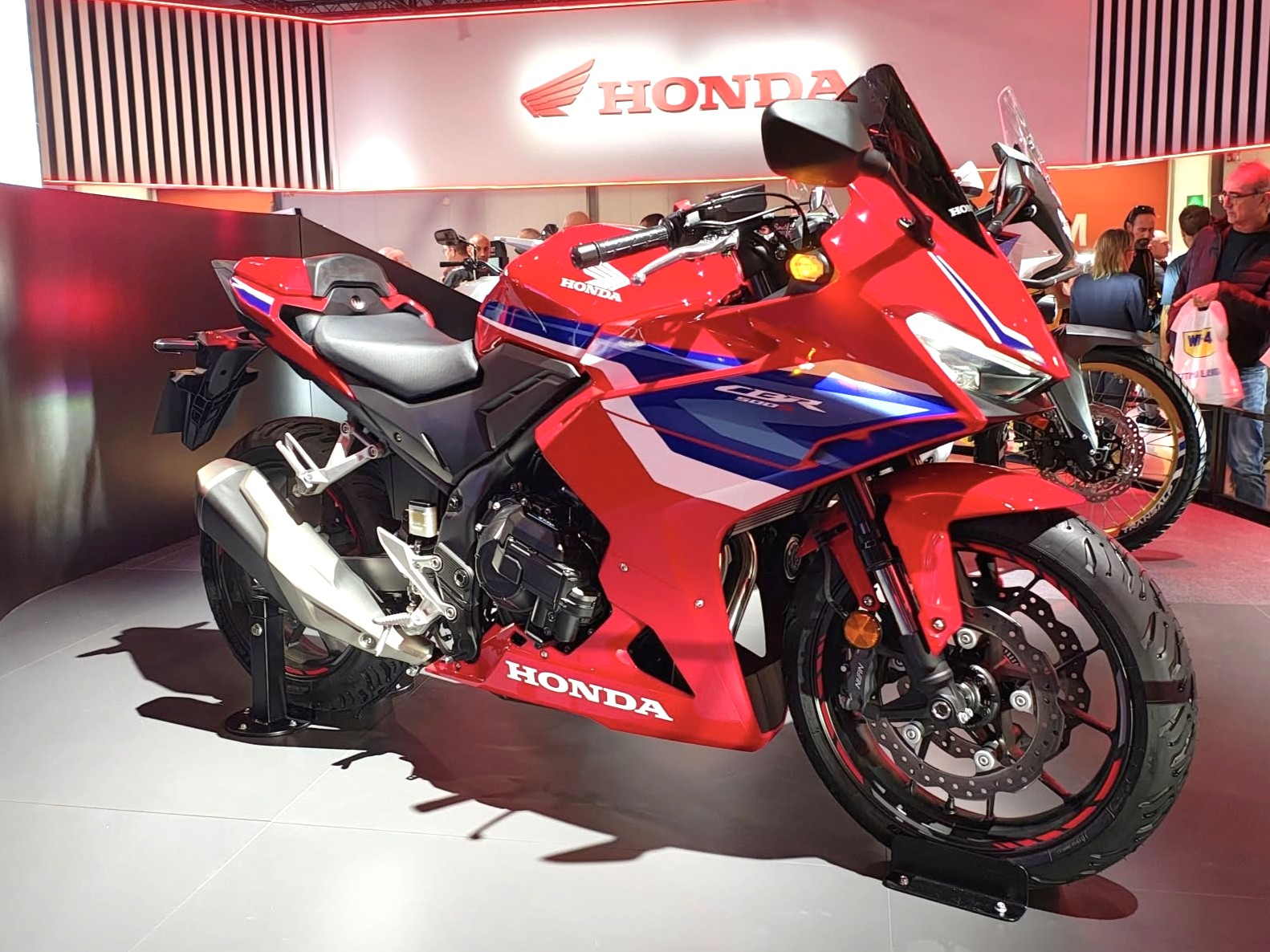
2025 Honda CBR500R

Inverted Showa Separate Function Fork - Big Piston (SFF-BP) forks, dual 296mm disk with radial calipers up front, updated triple tree clamps, new fuel injection settings that further increase torque feel and overall character, other changes include a lighter swingarm, lighter radiator, revised shock settings, redesigned and lighter front wheel, more powerful LEDs. The US Market only received the Pearl Organic Green colorway for 2022. For 2024, updates to the CB500X were accompanied with a different model name. Honda brought back the NX moniker, thus establishing their intention of product placing the model closer to the dual sport genre of motorcycles. The new name, replacing globally the CB500X, was NX500.

The CB500X was released at a price of ฿224,900 (US$7,032.52) in Thailand. In Germany, the CB500X was released at €7,099 (US$8,395.99).

=== Reactions ===
Since its launch, the range received many favorable reviews; some preferring the taller X model while the sporty R model was one of Honda's top selling bikes in Canada during 2015 and best selling sports bike in Australia. Many commentators, especially in off-road and long-distance touring, argued the need for such middleweight bikes. Perhaps as a consequence, in 2015, RallyRaid, a British after-market specialist, created upgrade kits for the R & F machines and a full adventure conversion kit for the X model.

Multiple small improvements in the 2019 range impressed commentators with MCN describing the CB500X as an exceptional machine.

== Specifications ==
All specifications are manufacturer claimed unless otherwise specified. The motorcycle model designation is printed on a sticker under the seat.

Model	CB500F	CBR500R	CB500X
Type	Naked	Sport	Adventure
Engine	Four stroke, parallel twin, DOHC, 8 valves, liquid-cooled		
Displacement	471 cc (28.7 cu in)		
Bore x stroke	67.0 mm × 66.8 mm (2.64 in × 2.63 in)		
Compression ratio	10.7 : 1		
Fuel delivery	Honda PGM-FI via 34 mm (1.3 in) throttle bodies		
Ignition	Fully transistorized with ignition advance		
Maximum power	35 kW (47 hp) at 8,500 rpm		
Maximum torque	43 N⋅m (32 lbf⋅ft) at 7,000 rpm		
Transmission	6-speed sequential, constant mesh		
Clutch	Wet, multi-plate, coil spring Honda E-Clutch (2026-present)		
Final drive	520 o-ring chain, 112 links		
Frame	Tubular steel, diamond, stressed engine		
Rake	25.5°		26.5° (2013–2018); 27.5° (2019-present)
Trail	102 mm (4.0 in)		108 mm (4.3 in)
Turning radius	2,700 mm (110 in)		2,800 mm (110 in) (2013–2018); 2,400 mm (94 in) (2019–present)
Front wheel	17M/C × MT3.50 cast aluminium		17M/C × MT3.50 cast aluminium (2013-2018); 19M/C × MT2.50 cast aluminium (2019–present)
Rear wheel	17M/C × MT4.50 cast aluminium		
Front tyre	120/70 ZR17 58W		120/70 ZR17 55W (2013–2018); 110/80 R19 59H (2019–present)
Rear tyre	160/60 ZR17 69W		160/60 ZR17 69W (2013–2018); 160/60 R17 69H (2019–present)
Front brake	Single 320 mm (13 in) wave disc, 2 piston caliper, combined ABS (2013–2021); Dual 296 mm (11.7 in) wave disc, 2 piston caliper, combined ABS (2022–2024)		
Rear brake	Single 240 mm (9.4 in) wave disc, 1 piston caliper, combined ABS		
Front suspension	Conventional telescopic, 41mm (2013–2015); Conventional telescopic, 41mm, preload adjustable (2016–2021); Showa 41mm USD, preload adjustable (2022–2024); Showa 41 mm SFF-BP USD, preload adjustable (2025-present)		
Rear suspension	Prolink single shock, 9-stage preload adjustable; steel square pipe double-sided swingarm		
Front suspension travel	122 mm (4.8 in)		140 mm (5.5 in)
Rear suspension travel	120 mm (4.7 in)		105 mm (4.1 in)
Wheelbase	1,410 mm (56 in)		1,420 mm (56 in) (2013–2018); 1,445 mm (56.9 in) (2019–present)
Overall length	2,080 mm (82 in)		2,095 mm (82.5 in) (2013–2018); 2,155 mm (84.8 in) (2019–present)
Overall width	780 mm (31 in) (2013–2015); 790 mm (31 in) (2016–present)	740 mm (29 in) (2013–2015); 750 mm (30 in) (2016–2018); 755 mm (29.7 in) (2019–present)	830 mm (33 in) (2013–2018); 825 mm (32.5 in) (2019–present)
Overall height	1,060 mm (42 in)	1,145 mm (45.1 in)	Windscreen low: 1,260 mm (50 in) (2013–2015); 1,360 mm (54 in) (2016–2018); 1,410 mm (56 in) (2019–present); Windscreen high: 1,290 mm (51 in) (2013–2015); 1,390 mm (55 in) (2016–2018); 1,445 mm (56.9 in) (2019–present)
Seat height	785 mm (30.9 in)		810 mm (32 in) (2013–2018); 830 mm (33 in) (2019–present)
Ground clearance	155 mm (6.1 in) (2013–2015); 160 mm (6.3 in) (2016–2018); 145 mm (5.7 in) (2019–present)	140 mm (5.5 in) (2013–2018); 130 mm (5.1 in) (2019–present)	170 mm (6.7 in) (2013–2018); 180 mm (7.1 in) (2019–present)
Fuel tank capacity	15.5 L (3.4 imp gal; 4.1 US gal) (2013–2015); 16.7 L (3.7 imp gal; 4.4 US gal) (2016–2018); 17.1 L (3.8 imp gal; 4.5 US gal) (2019–present)		17.3 L (3.8 imp gal; 4.6 US gal) (2013–2018); 17.5 L (3.8 imp gal; 4.6 US gal) (2019–present)
Engine oil	3.2 L (0.70 imp gal; 0.85 US gal)		
Coolant	1.4 L (0.31 imp gal; 0.37 US gal)		
Wet weight	190 kg (419 lb) (2013–2015); 188 kg (414 lb) (2016–2018); 187 kg (412 lb) (2019–present) +2 kg (4.4 lb) ABS +1 kg (2.2 lb) California	193 kg (425 lb) (2013–2015); 192 kg (423 lb) (2016–2018); 190 kg (419 lb) (2019–present) +2 kg (4.4 lb) ABS +1 kg (2.2 lb) California	192 kg (423 lb) (2013–2018); 195 kg (430 lb) (2019–present) +2 kg (4.4 lb) ABS +1 kg (2.2 lb) California
Maximum weight capacity	168 kg (370 lb)		185 kg (408 lb)
Fuel consumption	28.4 km/L (80 mpg_{‑imp}; 67 mpg_{‑US}) (2013–2015); 29.4 km/L (83 mpg_{‑imp}; 69 mpg_{‑US}) (2016–2018); 28.6 km/L (81 mpg_{‑imp}; 67 mpg_{‑US}) (2019–present)		28.4 km/L (80 mpg_{‑imp}; 67 mpg_{‑US}) (2013–2015); 29.4 km/L (83 mpg_{‑imp}; 69 mpg_{‑US}) (2016–2018); 27.8 km/L (79 mpg_{‑imp}; 65 mpg_{‑US}) (2019–present)
