= Héctor Barberá =

Spanish motorcycle racer

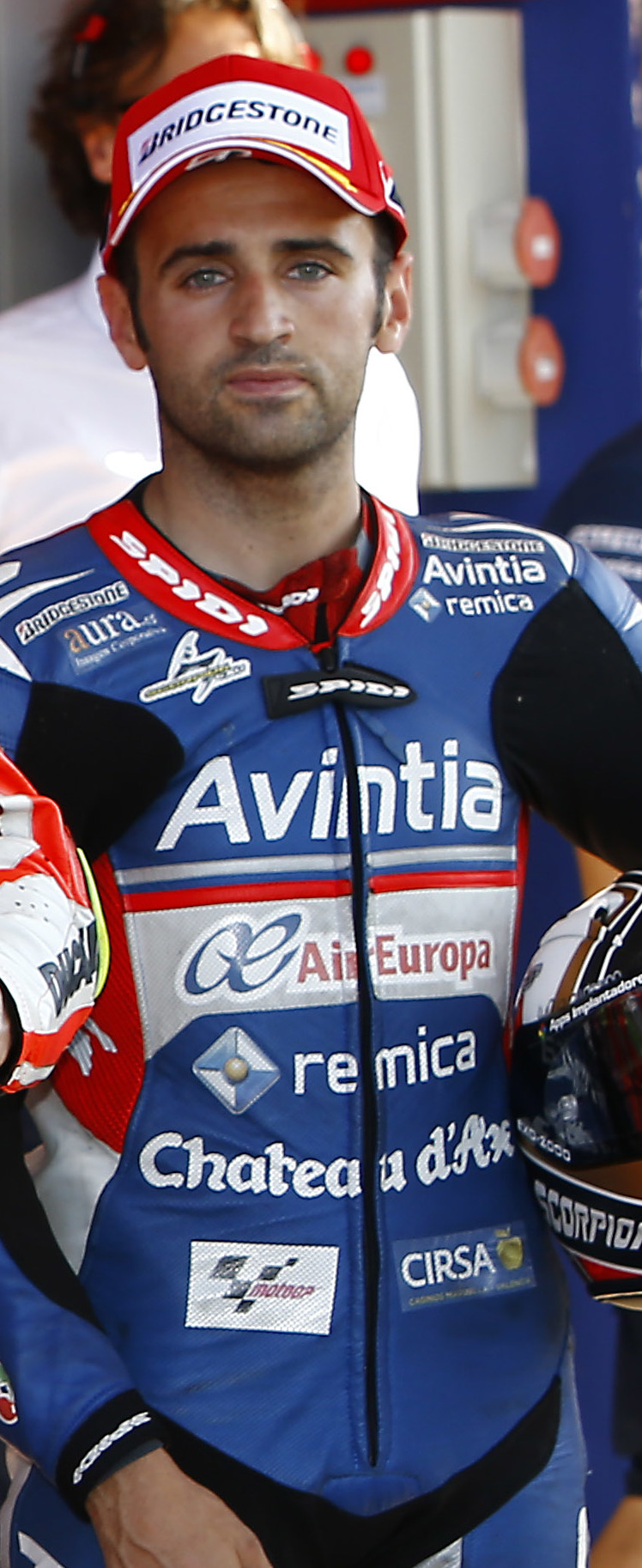
- Barberá in 2015
- Nationality: Spanish
- Born: 2 November 1986 (age 40); Dos Aguas, Spain
- Website: hectorbarbera.com
Motorcycle racing career statistics
MotoGP World Championship
Active years	2010–2017
Manufacturers	Ducati, FTR, Avintia
Championships	0
2017 championship position	22nd (28 pts)
Starts / Wins / Podiums / Poles / F. laps / Points; 139 / 0 / 0 / 0 / 0 / 479
Moto2 World Championship
Active years	2018
Manufacturers	Kalex
Championships	0
2018 championship position	23rd (10 pts)
Starts / Wins / Podiums / Poles / F. laps / Points; 6 / 0 / 0 / 0 / 0 / 10
250cc World Championship
Active years	2005–2009
Manufacturers	Honda, Aprilia
Championships	0
2009 championship position	2nd (239 pts)
Starts / Wins / Podiums / Poles / F. laps / Points; 75 / 4 / 20 / 8 / 4 / 830
125cc World Championship
Active years	2002–2004
Manufacturers	Aprilia
Championships	0
2004 championship position	2nd (202 pts)
Starts / Wins / Podiums / Poles / F. laps / Points; 47 / 6 / 12 / 1 / 6 / 416
Superbike World Championship
Active years	2019
Manufacturers	Kawasaki
Championships	0
2019 championship position	27th (3 pts)
Starts / Wins / Podiums / Poles / F. laps / Points; 4 / 0 / 0 / 0 / 0 / 3
Supersport World Championship
Active years	2018–2019
Manufacturers	Kawasaki, Yamaha
Championships	0
2019 championship position	16th (22 pts)
Starts / Wins / Podiums / Poles / F. laps / Points; 6 / 0 / 0 / 0 / 0 / 49
British Superbike Championship
Active years	2020, 2023–
Manufacturers	BMW, Honda
Championships	0
2020 championship position	17th (32 pts)
Starts / Wins / Podiums / Poles / F. laps / Points; 18 / 0 / 0 / 0 / 1 / 32

Héctor Barberá Vall (born 2 November 1986) is a Spanish former Grand Prix motorcycle road racer. He competed in MotoGP, Moto2, Superbike, and in MotoAmerica for more than two decades, from 2002 all the way until 2023.

== Career ==
Born in Dos Aguas, Valencia Province, Barberá began his World Championship career at the age of 15 in the 2002 Spanish 125 Championship, which he won, and the 2002 125cc world championship, under the guidance of Jorge Martínez "Aspar", who teamed Barberá and fellow youngster Ángel Rodríguez up with the experienced Pablo Nieto.

In his first season, Barberá established himself as the most promising rider of the three and in 2003 he broke through, with his first victory at Donington Park making him one of the youngest riders ever to win a Grand Prix. A strong finish to the season saw him take third place in the championship and he signed up for a title challenge with Seedorf Racing in 2003. Several inopportune crashes and mechanical failures derailed his hopes but victory in the final race secured the runner-up spot and a factory ride with Fortuna Honda in the 250cc class for 2005. After two years with the team, he moved to Team Toth in 2007.

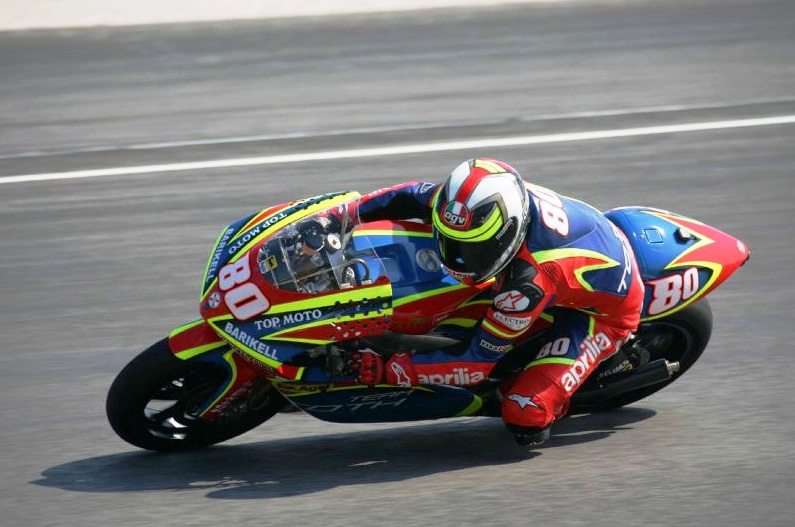
Barberá riding an Aprilia at the 2007 Italian Grand Prix.

Barberá survived a huge crash during the Italian round of the championship on June 1, 2008. Running second behind Marco Simoncelli on the penultimate lap who tried to defend his lead by changing his line on the straight, Barberá slipstreamed onto Simoncelli's back wheel and clipped it with his front brake lever. His bike somersaulted through the air, with Barberá escaping somewhat uninjured. However, a further crash in practice at Motegi left him with two spinal fractures, ending his season.

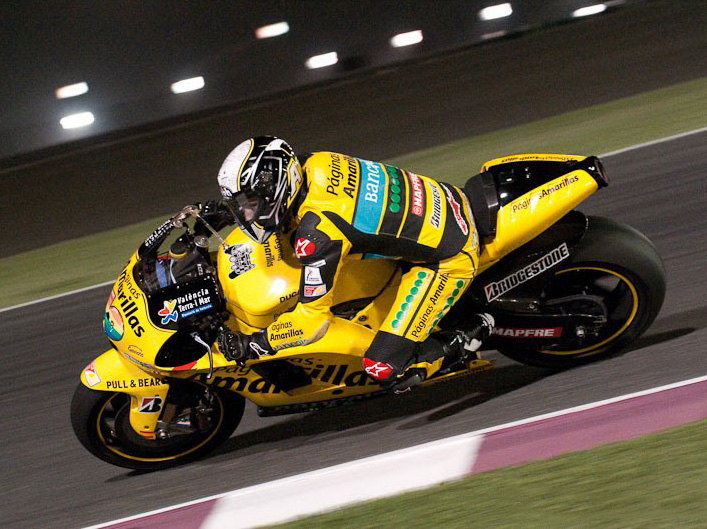
Barberá riding at the 2010 Qatar Grand Prix.

In the 2009 250cc world championship, Barberá won three races along with five other podium results to finish second to Honda's Hiroshi Aoyama. Barberá won the 2009 Valencia Grand Prix, the final two-stroke, 250cc race in Grand Prix history, as the class was to be discontinued in favor of the four-stroke Moto2 class in 2010. On 20 August 2009, it was announced Barberá would move to MotoGP in 2010, riding for the Aspar Team aboard Ducati customer bikes. Barberá finished the 2010 MotoGP season in twelfth place, and followed up with an eleventh place in 2011. On 7 November 2011, it was announced that he was moving to Pramac Racing for the 2012 season.

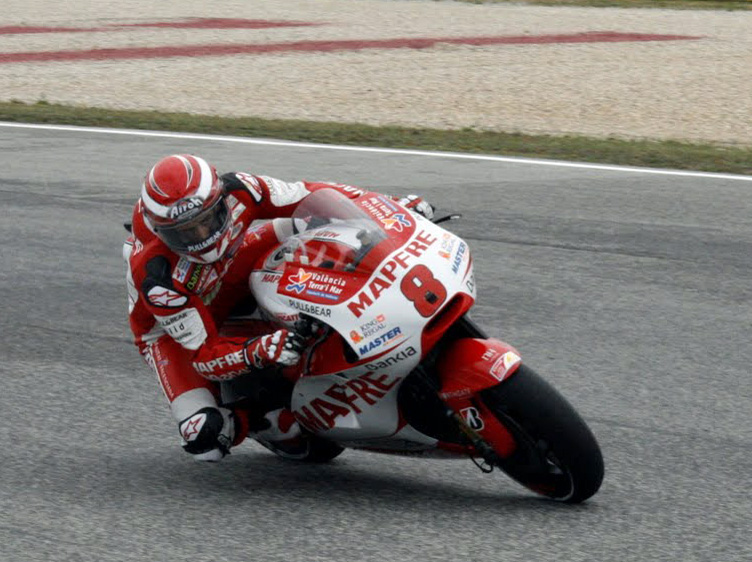
Hector Barbera riding a Ducati MotoGP bike at the 2011 Portuguese motorcycle Grand Prix.

In 2016, Barberá finished a career best of tenth place in the MotoGP standings. That year, he had his only two races for a factory MotoGP team, replacing Andrea Iannone at Ducati Corse. Barbera switched to Moto2 after failing to find a MotoGP ride for 2018. He competed at the last Grand Prix of his career that year at Mugello.

Barberá later competed in World Superbikes, World Supersport, MotoAmerica, and British Superbikes.

== Legal issues ==
Barberá was sentenced to six months in jail for assault and battery in 2013.

Barberá was ordered to serve 22 days of community service in 2018 for driving under the influence, which caused him to lose his Pons Racing Moto2 ride.

Barberá was accused of stealing a Yamaha Supersport bike owned by his own team, Team Toth, in 2019.

In 2023, Barberá was investigated for fraud and forgery. It was also revealed by Andorran news website Altaveu that he had a search and arrest warrant issued against him since 2019 for another undisclosed affair.

== Career statistics ==
=== Grand Prix motorcycle racing ===
==== By season ====
Season	Class	Motorcycle	Team	Race	Win	Podium	Pole	FLap	Pts	Plcd
2002	125cc	Aprilia	Master–Aspar Team	15	0	0	0	0	50	14th
2003	125cc	Aprilia	Master–MXOnda–Aspar Team	16	2	5	0	2	164	**3rd**
2004	125cc	Aprilia	Seedorf Racing	16	4	7	1	4	202	**2nd**
2005	250cc	Honda	Fortuna Honda	16	0	0	0	0	120	9th
2006	250cc	Aprilia	Fortuna Aprilia	14	1	3	2	1	152	7th
2007	250cc	Aprilia	Team Tóth Aprilia	17	0	5	0	1	177	5th
2008	250cc	Aprilia	Team Tóth Aprilia	12	0	4	2	1	142	6th
2009	250cc	Aprilia	Pepe World Team	16	3	8	4	1	239	**2nd**
2010	MotoGP	Ducati	Páginas Amarillas Aspar	18	0	0	0	0	90	12th
2011	MotoGP	Ducati	Mapfre Aspar Team MotoGP	16	0	0	0	0	82	11th
2012	MotoGP	Ducati	Pramac Racing Team	15	0	0	0	0	83	11th
2013	MotoGP	FTR	Avintia Blusens	18	0	0	0	0	35	16th
2014	MotoGP	Avintia	Avintia Racing	18	0	0	0	0	26	18th
2014	MotoGP	Ducati	Avintia Racing	18	0	0	0	0	26	18th
2015	MotoGP	Ducati	Avintia Racing	18	0	0	0	0	33	15th
2016	MotoGP	Ducati	Avintia Racing	16	0	0	0	0	102	10th
2016	MotoGP	Ducati	Ducati Team	2	0	0	0	0	102	10th
2017	MotoGP	Ducati	Reale Avintia Racing	18	0	0	0	0	28	22nd
2018	Moto2	Kalex	Pons HP40	6	0	0	0	0	10	23rd
Total				**267**	**10**	**32**	**9**	**10**	**1735**	

==== By class ====
Class	Seasons	1st GP	1st Pod	1st Win	Race	Win	Podiums	Pole	FLap	Pts	WChmp
125cc	2002–2004	2002 Japan	2003 Netherlands	2003 Great Britain	47	6	12	1	6	416	0
250cc	2005–2009	2005 Spain	2006 Turkey	2006 China	75	4	20	8	4	830	0
Moto2	2018	2018 Qatar			6	0	0	0	0	10	0
MotoGP	2010–2017	2010 Qatar			139	0	0	0	0	479	0
Total	2002–2018				**267**	**10**	**32**	**9**	**10**	**1735**	**0**

==== Races by year ====
(key) (Races in bold indicate pole position, races in italics indicate fastest lap)

Year	Class	Bike	1	2	3	4	5	6	7	8	9	10	11	12	13	14	15	16	17	18	19	Pos	Pts
2002	125cc	Aprilia	JPN; 16	RSA; DNS	SPA; 12	FRA; 15	ITA; Ret	CAT; 18	NED; 20	GBR; Ret	GER; 21	CZE; 4	POR; Ret	RIO; 15	PAC; 5	MAL; 8	AUS; 14	VAL; 6				14th	50
2003	125cc	Aprilia	JPN; Ret	RSA; 13	SPA; 7	FRA; 11	ITA; 9	CAT; Ret	NED; 3	GBR; 1	GER; 14	CZE; 5	POR; 2	RIO; 9	PAC; 1	MAL; 8	AUS; 6	VAL; 3				**3rd**	**164**
2004	125cc	Aprilia	RSA; 10	SPA; 3	FRA; 5	ITA; 3	CAT; 1	NED; 6	**RIO**; 1	GER; 2	GBR; Ret	CZE; 7	POR; 1	JPN; Ret	QAT; 12	MAL; Ret	AUS; 6	VAL; 1				**2nd**	**202**
2005	250cc	Honda	SPA; 5	POR; 11	CHN; 7	FRA; 7	ITA; 6	CAT; 16	NED; 9	GBR; Ret	GER; 8	CZE; Ret	JPN; 8	MAL; 6	QAT; 7	AUS; 4	TUR; 6	VAL; 5				9th	120
2006	250cc	Aprilia	SPA; 5	QAT; 4	TUR; 2	**CHN**; 1	FRA; 7	ITA; Ret	CAT	NED	GBR; 5	GER; 5	CZE; 5	**MAL**; Ret	AUS; 6	JPN; 7	POR; 10	VAL; 3				7th	152
2007	250cc	Aprilia	QAT; 3	SPA; Ret	TUR; 8	CHN; 6	FRA; 4	ITA; 3	CAT; 8	GBR; Ret	NED; 7	GER; 6	CZE; 4	RSM; 3	POR; 5	JPN; 3	AUS; Ret	MAL; 2	VAL; 5			5th	177
2008	250cc	Aprilia	QAT; 2	SPA; 5	POR; 8	CHN; 6	FRA; 12	**ITA**; Ret	CAT; 3	GBR; 4	NED; 5	GER; 2	CZE; 4	**RSM**; 3	INP; C	JPN; DNS	AUS	MAL	VAL			6th	142
2009	250cc	Aprilia	QAT; 1	JPN; 11	SPA; 4	FRA; 11	ITA; 5	**CAT**; 3	**NED**; 2	GER; 5	**GBR**; 8	CZE; 7	INP; 6	RSM; 1	**POR**; 3	AUS; 2	MAL; 2	VAL; 1				**2nd**	**239**
2010	MotoGP	Ducati	QAT; 12	SPA; 13	FRA; 8	ITA; 12	GBR; 11	NED; 12	CAT; 10	GER; 9	USA; Ret	CZE; 9	INP; 10	RSM; 9	ARA; 11	JPN; 13	MAL; 11	AUS; 14	POR; 10	VAL; 8		12th	90
2011	MotoGP	Ducati	QAT; 12	SPA; 6	POR; Ret	FRA; 9	CAT; 11	GBR; 11	NED; 12	ITA; 7	GER; 11	USA; 9	CZE; 10	INP; Ret	RSM; 9	ARA; 8	JPN; Ret	AUS	MAL; C	VAL; 11		11th	82
2012	MotoGP	Ducati	QAT; 9	SPA; 10	POR; 10	FRA; 9	CAT; 11	GBR; 10	NED; 7	GER; 9	ITA; 9	USA	INP; WD	CZE	RSM; Ret	ARA; 12	JPN; 10	MAL; 7	AUS; 12	VAL; Ret		11th	83
2013	MotoGP	FTR	QAT; 13	AME; 18	SPA; 12	FRA; 18	ITA; 10	CAT; Ret	NED; 20	GER; 11	USA; 10	INP; 16	CZE; Ret	GBR; 13	RSM; Ret	ARA; Ret	MAL; 14	AUS; 14	JPN; 16	VAL; 12		16th	35
2014	MotoGP	Avintia	QAT; Ret	AME; 15	ARG; 16	SPA; 15	FRA; Ret	ITA; Ret	CAT; 19	NED; 18	GER; 18	INP; Ret	CZE; 17	GBR; 19	RSM; 19							18th	26
2014	MotoGP	Ducati														ARA; 19	JPN; 15	AUS; 5	MAL; 9	VAL; 11		18th	26
2015	MotoGP	Ducati	QAT; 15	AME; 12	ARG; 13	SPA; 14	FRA; 13	ITA; 13	CAT; 16	NED; Ret	GER; 13	INP; 15	CZE; 16	GBR; 13	RSM; 18	ARA; 16	JPN; 9	AUS; 16	MAL; 13	VAL; 16		15th	33
2016	MotoGP	Ducati	QAT; 9	ARG; 5	AME; 9	SPA; 10	FRA; 8	ITA; 12	CAT; 11	NED; 6	GER; 9	AUT; DSQ	CZE; 5	GBR; 14	RSM; 13	ARA; 13	JPN; 17	AUS; Ret	MAL; 4	VAL; 11		10th	102
2017	MotoGP	Ducati	QAT; 13	ARG; 13	AME; 14	SPA; 12	FRA; Ret	ITA; 14	CAT; 9	NED; 16	GER; DSQ	CZE; 20	AUT; 17	GBR; 14	RSM; Ret	ARA; 18	JPN; 14	AUS; 20	MAL; 14	VAL; 15		22nd	28
2018	Moto2	Kalex	QAT; 13	ARG; 20	AME; 18	SPA; 14	FRA; 11	ITA; Ret	CAT	NED	GER	CZE	AUT	GBR	RSM	ARA	THA	JPN	AUS	MAL	VAL	23rd	10

=== Supersport World Championship ===
==== Races by year ====
(key) (Races in bold indicate pole position, races in italics indicate fastest lap)

Year	Bike	1	2	3	4	5	6	7	8	9	10	11	12	Pos	Pts
2018	Kawasaki	AUS	THA	SPA	NED	ITA	GBR	CZE	ITA	POR; 11	FRA; 10	ARG; 9	QAT; 7	17th	27
2019	Yamaha	AUS; 4	THA; 7	SPA; DNS	NED	ITA	SPA	ITA	GBR	POR	FRA	ARG	QAT	16th	22

=== Superbike World Championship ===
==== Races by year ====
(key) (Races in bold indicate pole position, races in italics indicate fastest lap)

Year	Bike	1			2			3			4			5			6			7			8			9			10			11			12			13			Pos	Pts
Year	Bike	R1	SR	R2	R1	SR	R2	R1	SR	R2	R1	SR	R2	R1	SR	R2	R1	SR	R2	R1	SR	R2	R1	SR	R2	R1	SR	R2	R1	SR	R2	R1	SR	R2	R1	SR	R2	R1	SR	R2	Pos	Pts
2019	Kawasaki	AUS	AUS	AUS	THA	THA	THA	SPA	SPA	SPA	NED; 16	NED; C	NED; 16	ITA; 13	ITA; 14	ITA; C	SPA	SPA	SPA	ITA	ITA	ITA	GBR	GBR	GBR	USA	USA	USA	POR	POR	POR	FRA	FRA	FRA	ARG	ARG	ARG	QAT	QAT	QAT	27th	3

=== AMA Superbike Championship ===
==== Races by year ====
Season	Bike	Round																				Plcd.	Pts.
2021	BMW	RAT (Georgia (U.S. state))		VIR (Virginia)		RAM (Wisconsin)		RID (Washington (state))		MON (California)		BRA (Minnesota)		PIT (Pennsylvania)		NJE (New Jersey)			ALA (Alabama)			7th	157
2021	BMW	R1	R2	R1	R2	R1	R2	R1	R2	R1	R2	R1	R2	R1	R2	R1	R2	R3	R1	R2	R3	7th	157
2021	BMW	6	7	6	8	8	6	Ret	5	6	8	5	7	5	7	25	6	7	8	10	Ret	7th	157
2022	BMW	TEX (Texas)		ATL (Georgia (U.S. state))		VIR (Virginia)		RAM (Wisconsin)		RID (Washington (state))		MON (California)		BRA (Minnesota)		PIT (Pennsylvania)		NJE (New Jersey)		ALA (Alabama)		5th	190
2022	BMW	R1	R2	R1	R2	R1	R2	R1	R2	R1	R2	R1	R2	R1	R2	R1	R2	R1	R2	R1	R2	5th	190
2022	BMW	5	7	4	4	6	9	3	17	5	5	6	5	Ret	5	7	8	6	4	5	10	5th	190

=== British Superbike Championship ===
==== By year ====
Year	Bike	1		2		3			4		5		6		7		8		9			10		11		12			Pos	Pts
Year	Bike	R1	R2	R1	R2	R1	R2	R3	R1	R2	R1	R2	R1	R2	R1	R2	R1	R2	R1	R2	R3	R1	R2	R1	R2	R1	R2	R3	Pos	Pts
2019	Kawasaki	SIL	SIL	OUL	OUL	DON; 6	DON; 8	**DON**; Ret	BRH; 24	BRH; 20	KNO	KNO	SNE; 12	SNE; 7	THR; 20	THR; 16	CAD; 16	CAD; 11	OUL; DNS	OUL; Ret	OUL; DNS	ASS; 10	ASS; 11	DON; 17	DON; 17	BHGP; 20	BHGP; 19	BHGP; 16	19th	47

Year	Bike	1			2			3			4			5			6			7			8			9			10			11			Pos	Pts
Year	Bike	R1	R2	R3	R1	R2	R3	R1	R2	R3	R1	R2	R3	R1	R2	R3	R1	R2	R3	R1	R2	R3	R1	R2	R3	R1	R2	R3	R1	R2	R3	R1	R2	R3	Pos	Pts
2020	BMW	DON; Ret	DON; 10	DON; 10	SNE; 14	SNE; Ret	SNE; 15	SIL; 13	SIL; 10	SIL; 12	OUL; 18	OUL; 15	OUL; 14	DON; 22	DON; Ret	DON; Ret	BHGP; 16	BHGP; Ret	BHGP; 15																17th	32
2023	Honda	SIL; Ret	SIL; 18	SIL; 15	OUL; 21	OUL; 20	OUL; 21	DON; 15	DON; 13	DON; 15	KNO; Ret	KNO; 16	KNO; 15	SNE; 21	SNE; Ret	SNE; 17	BRH	BRH	BRH	THR; 23	THR; 22	THR; 17	CAD; 17	CAD; 15	CAD; 15	OUL; 17	OUL; 18	OUL; 18	DON; WD	DON; WD	DON; WD	BRH	BRH	BRH	28th	9

Sporting positions
Preceded by Ángel Rodríguez	Spanish 125cc Champion; 2002	Succeeded by Álvaro Bautista
