= 2023 Superbike World Championship =

Motorsport championship

2023 Superbike World Championship
Previous:	2022	Next:	2024
Support series: Supersport World Championship; Supersport 300 World Championship; Yamaha R3 bLU cRU World Cup

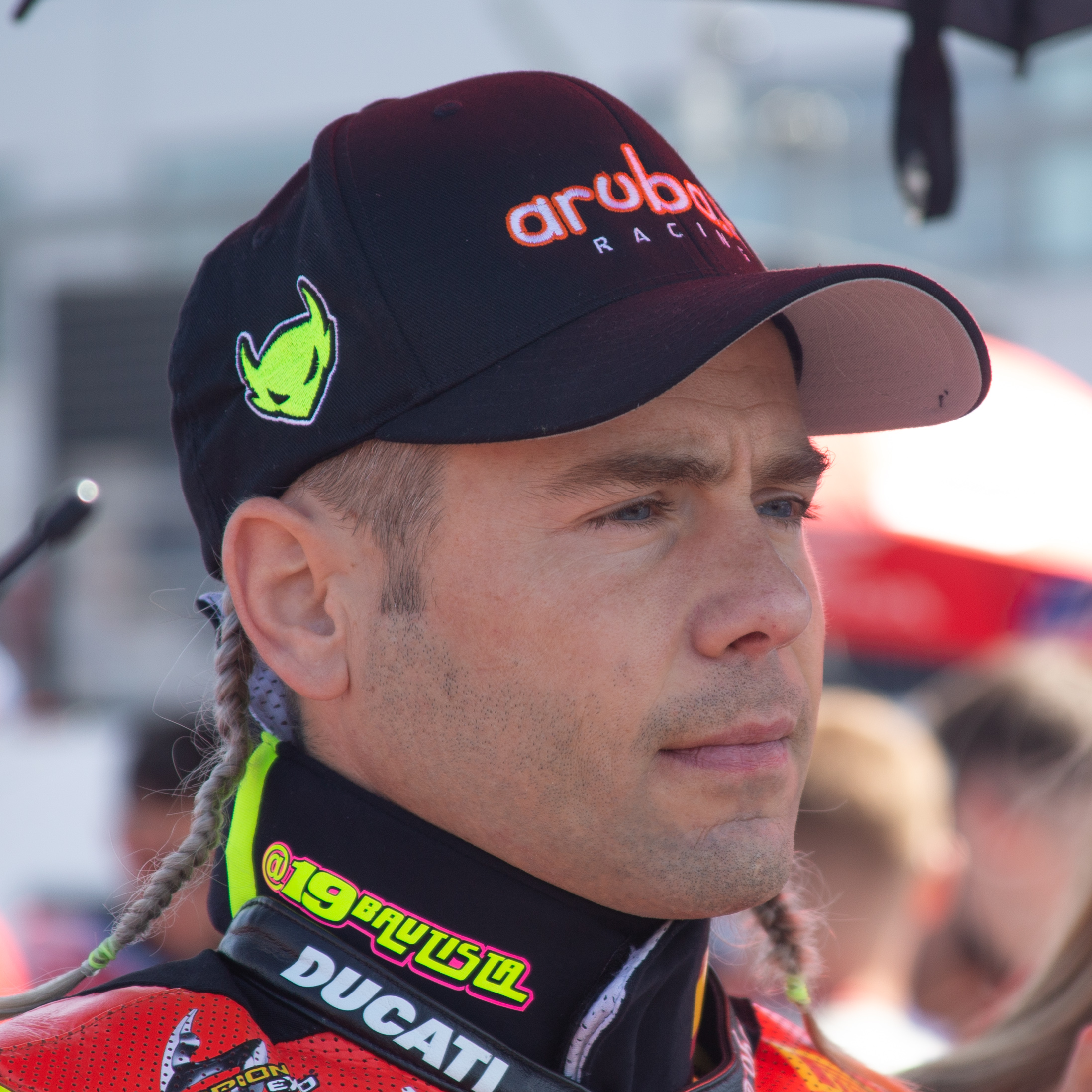
Defending Champion Álvaro Bautista (pictured in 2022) won his second Superbike Championship.

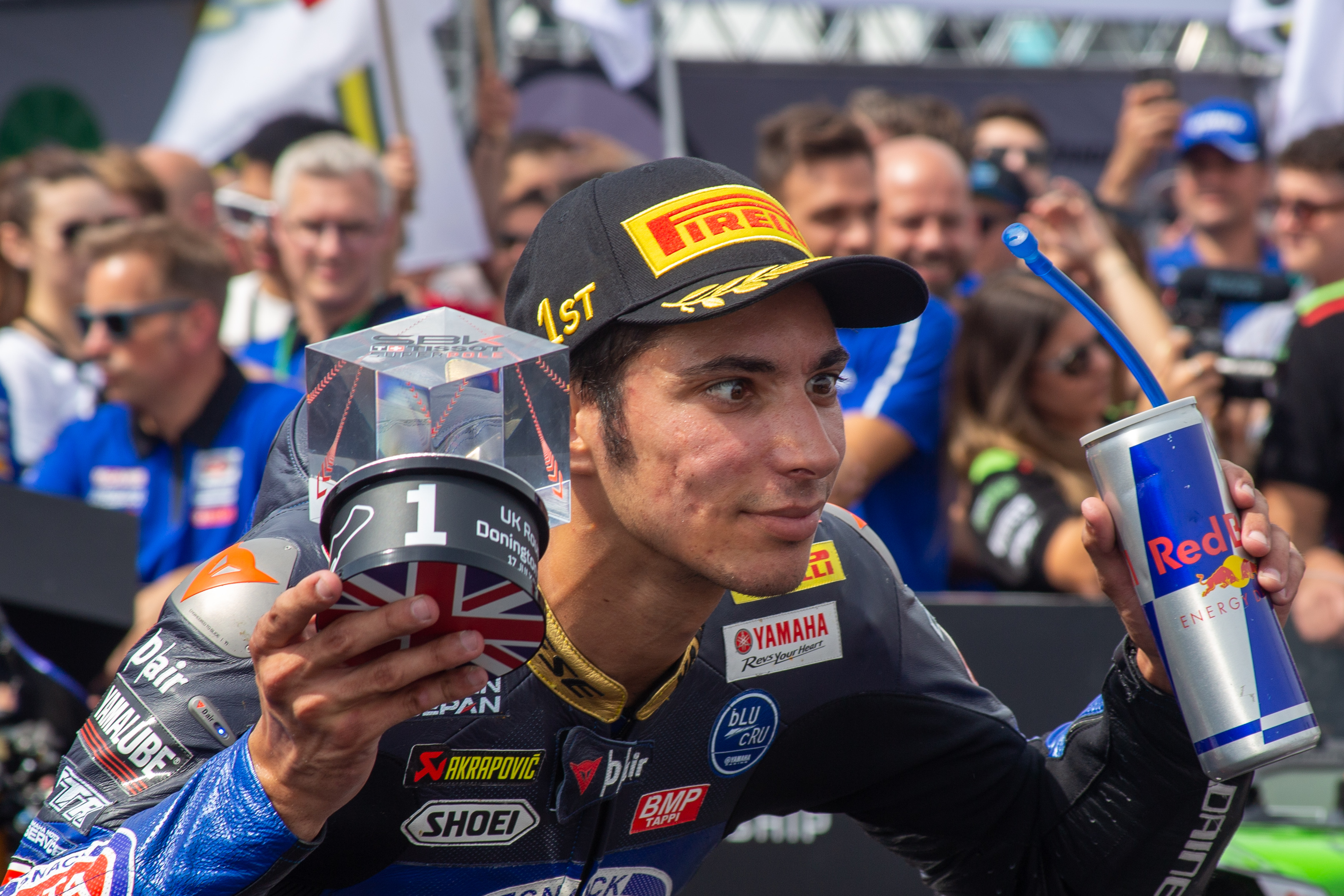
Former Champion Toprak Razgatlıoğlu (pictured in 2022) finished second.

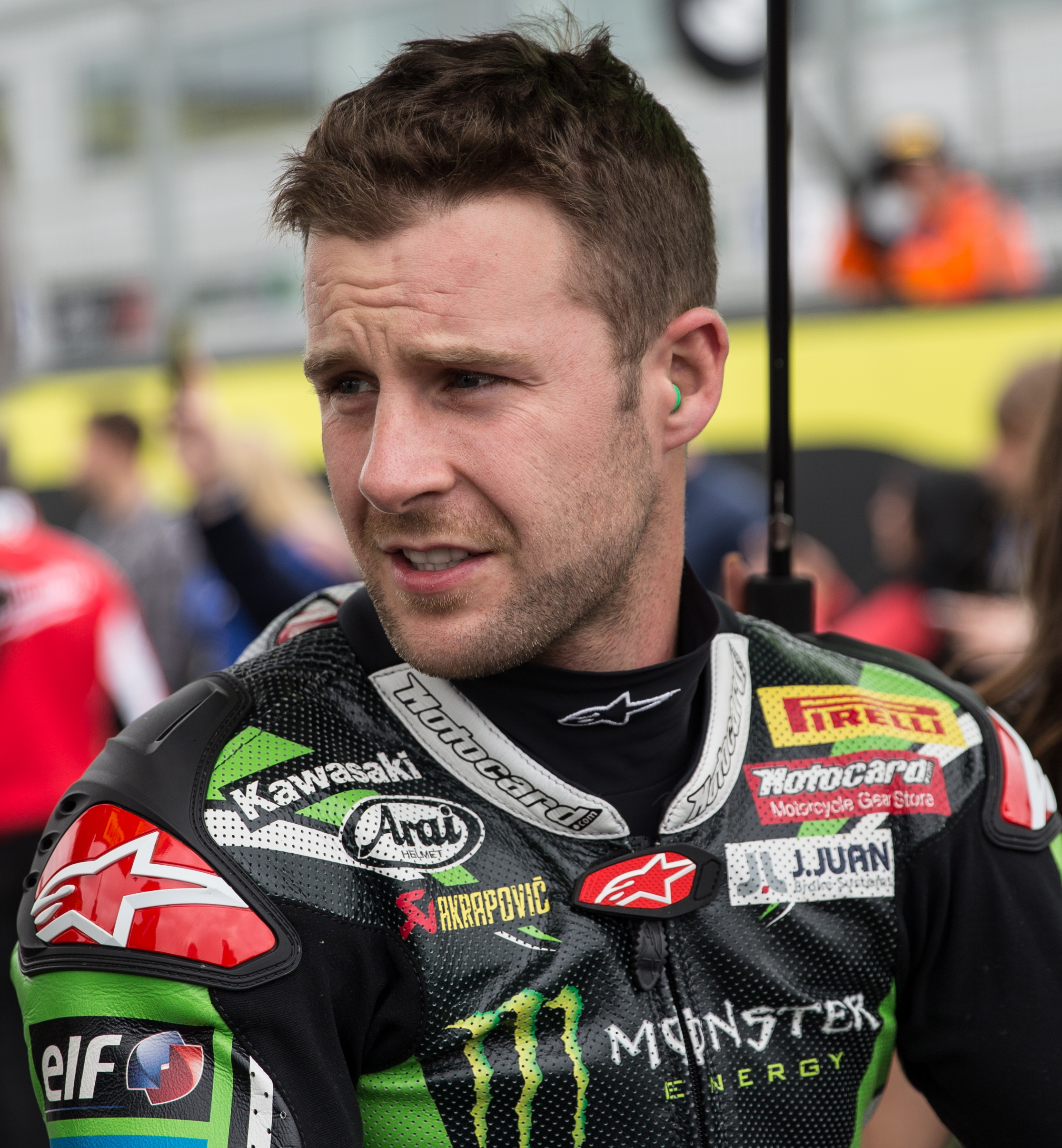
Former Six-Time Champion Jonathan Rea (pictured in 2016) finished third.

The 2023 Superbike World Championship was the 36th season of the Superbike World Championship. The championship was won by Álvaro Bautista, who came into the season as the defending world champion. Axel Bassani won the Independent riders' championship.

== Race calendar and results ==
The provisional 2023 season calendar was announced on 8 November 2022. It was then updated on 28 February 2023 to announce the seventh round at Imola Circuit on 14–16 July. It was updated again on 24 July, the Argentinian round at Circuito San Juan Villicum was cancelled due to the political reasons. On 2 August, it was announced that Circuito de Jerez will be the Argentina Round's replacement, making it the track's return to the championship with the last one being held in 2021.

2023 Superbike World Championship Calendar
Round			Circuit	Date	Superpole	Fastest lap	Winning rider	Winning team	Winning constructor	Ref
1	R1	(Australia) Grand Ridge Brewery Australian Round	Phillip Island Grand Prix Circuit	25 February	(Turkey) Toprak Razgatlıoğlu	(United Kingdom) Jonathan Rea	(Spain) Álvaro Bautista	Aruba.it Racing – Ducati	(Italy) Ducati	
1	SR	(Australia) Grand Ridge Brewery Australian Round	Phillip Island Grand Prix Circuit	26 February	(Turkey) Toprak Razgatlıoğlu	(Switzerland) Dominique Aegerter	(Spain) Álvaro Bautista	Aruba.it Racing – Ducati	(Italy) Ducati	
1	R2	(Australia) Grand Ridge Brewery Australian Round	Phillip Island Grand Prix Circuit	26 February		(Spain) Álvaro Bautista	(Spain) Álvaro Bautista	Aruba.it Racing – Ducati	(Italy) Ducati	
2	R1	(Indonesia) MOTUL Indonesian Round	Pertamina Mandalika International Street Circuit	4 March	(Turkey) Toprak Razgatlıoğlu	(Spain) Álvaro Bautista	(Spain) Álvaro Bautista	Aruba.it Racing – Ducati	(Italy) Ducati	
2	SR	(Indonesia) MOTUL Indonesian Round	Pertamina Mandalika International Street Circuit	5 March	(Turkey) Toprak Razgatlıoğlu	(United Kingdom) Jonathan Rea	(Turkey) Toprak Razgatlıoğlu	Pata Yamaha Prometeon WorldSBK	(Japan) Yamaha	
2	R2	(Indonesia) MOTUL Indonesian Round	Pertamina Mandalika International Street Circuit	5 March		(Spain) Álvaro Bautista	(Spain) Álvaro Bautista	Aruba.it Racing – Ducati	(Italy) Ducati	
3	R1	(Netherlands) Pirelli Dutch Round	TT Circuit Assen	22 April	(Spain) Álvaro Bautista	(Spain) Álvaro Bautista	(Spain) Álvaro Bautista	Aruba.it Racing – Ducati	(Italy) Ducati	
3	SR	(Netherlands) Pirelli Dutch Round	TT Circuit Assen	23 April	(Spain) Álvaro Bautista	(Spain) Álvaro Bautista	(Spain) Álvaro Bautista	Aruba.it Racing – Ducati	(Italy) Ducati	
3	R2	(Netherlands) Pirelli Dutch Round	TT Circuit Assen	23 April		(Spain) Álvaro Bautista	(Spain) Álvaro Bautista	Aruba.it Racing – Ducati	(Italy) Ducati	
4	R1	(Catalonia) Prosseco DOC Catalunya Round	Circuit de Barcelona-Catalunya	6 May	(Spain) Álvaro Bautista	(Spain) Álvaro Bautista	(Spain) Álvaro Bautista	Aruba.it Racing – Ducati	(Italy) Ducati	
4	SR	(Catalonia) Prosseco DOC Catalunya Round	Circuit de Barcelona-Catalunya	7 May	(Spain) Álvaro Bautista	(Spain) Álvaro Bautista	(Spain) Álvaro Bautista	Aruba.it Racing – Ducati	(Italy) Ducati	
4	R2	(Catalonia) Prosseco DOC Catalunya Round	Circuit de Barcelona-Catalunya	7 May		(Spain) Álvaro Bautista	(Spain) Álvaro Bautista	Aruba.it Racing – Ducati	(Italy) Ducati	
5	R1	Pirelli Emilia-Romagna Round	Misano World Circuit Marco Simoncelli	3 June	(Spain) Álvaro Bautista	(Spain) Álvaro Bautista	(Spain) Álvaro Bautista	Aruba.it Racing – Ducati	(Italy) Ducati	
5	SR	Pirelli Emilia-Romagna Round	Misano World Circuit Marco Simoncelli	4 June	(Spain) Álvaro Bautista	(Turkey) Toprak Razgatlıoğlu	(Spain) Álvaro Bautista	Aruba.it Racing – Ducati	(Italy) Ducati	
5	R2	Pirelli Emilia-Romagna Round	Misano World Circuit Marco Simoncelli	4 June		(Spain) Álvaro Bautista	(Spain) Álvaro Bautista	Aruba.it Racing – Ducati	(Italy) Ducati	
6	R1	(United Kingdom) Prosseco DOC UK Round	Donington Park Circuit	1 July	(United Kingdom) Jonathan Rea	(Spain) Álvaro Bautista	(Spain) Álvaro Bautista	Aruba.it Racing – Ducati	(Italy) Ducati	
6	SR	(United Kingdom) Prosseco DOC UK Round	Donington Park Circuit	2 July	(United Kingdom) Jonathan Rea	(Spain) Álvaro Bautista	(Turkey) Toprak Razgatlıoğlu	Pata Yamaha Prometeon WorldSBK	(Japan) Yamaha	
6	R2	(United Kingdom) Prosseco DOC UK Round	Donington Park Circuit	2 July		(Spain) Álvaro Bautista	(Spain) Álvaro Bautista	Aruba.it Racing – Ducati	(Italy) Ducati	
7	R1	(Italy) Prometeon Italian Round	Imola Circuit	15 July	(Turkey) Toprak Razgatlıoğlu	(Spain) Álvaro Bautista	(Spain) Álvaro Bautista	Aruba.it Racing – Ducati	(Italy) Ducati	
7	SR	(Italy) Prometeon Italian Round	Imola Circuit	16 July	(Turkey) Toprak Razgatlıoğlu	(Turkey) Toprak Razgatlıoğlu	(Turkey) Toprak Razgatlıoğlu	Pata Yamaha Prometeon WorldSBK	(Japan) Yamaha	
7	R2	(Italy) Prometeon Italian Round	Imola Circuit	16 July		(Italy) Axel Bassani	(Turkey) Toprak Razgatlıoğlu	Pata Yamaha Prometeon WorldSBK	(Japan) Yamaha	
8	R1	(Czech Republic) Czech Round	Autodrom Most	29 July	(Turkey) Toprak Razgatlıoğlu	(Spain) Álvaro Bautista	(United Kingdom) Jonathan Rea	Kawasaki Racing Team WorldSBK	(Japan) Kawasaki	
8	SR	(Czech Republic) Czech Round	Autodrom Most	30 July	(Turkey) Toprak Razgatlıoğlu	(Turkey) Toprak Razgatlıoğlu	(Turkey) Toprak Razgatlıoğlu	Pata Yamaha Prometeon WorldSBK	(Japan) Yamaha	
8	R2	(Czech Republic) Czech Round	Autodrom Most	30 July		(Turkey) Toprak Razgatlıoğlu	(Spain) Álvaro Bautista	Aruba.it Racing – Ducati	(Italy) Ducati	
9	R1	(France) Pirelli French Round	Circuit de Nevers Magny-Cours	9 September	(United States) Garrett Gerloff	(Spain) Álvaro Bautista	(Turkey) Toprak Razgatlıoğlu	Pata Yamaha Prometeon WorldSBK	(Japan) Yamaha	
9	SR	(France) Pirelli French Round	Circuit de Nevers Magny-Cours	10 September	(United States) Garrett Gerloff	(Spain) Álvaro Bautista	(Turkey) Toprak Razgatlıoğlu	Pata Yamaha Prometeon WorldSBK	(Japan) Yamaha	
9	R2	(France) Pirelli French Round	Circuit de Nevers Magny-Cours	10 September		(Spain) Álvaro Bautista	(Spain) Álvaro Bautista	Aruba.it Racing – Ducati	(Italy) Ducati	
10	R1	(Aragon) Aragón Round	MotorLand Aragón	23 September	(United Kingdom) Jonathan Rea	(Spain) Álvaro Bautista	(Italy) Michael Ruben Rinaldi	Aruba.it Racing – Ducati	(Italy) Ducati	
10	SR	(Aragon) Aragón Round	MotorLand Aragón	24 September	(United Kingdom) Jonathan Rea	(United Kingdom) Jonathan Rea	(Spain) Álvaro Bautista	Aruba.it Racing – Ducati	(Italy) Ducati	
10	R2	(Aragon) Aragón Round	MotorLand Aragón	24 September		(Spain) Álvaro Bautista	(Spain) Álvaro Bautista	Aruba.it Racing – Ducati	(Italy) Ducati	
11	R1	(Portugal) Pirelli Portuguese Round	Algarve International Circuit	30 September	(United Kingdom) Jonathan Rea	(Spain) Álvaro Bautista	(Spain) Álvaro Bautista	Aruba.it Racing – Ducati	(Italy) Ducati	
11	SR	(Portugal) Pirelli Portuguese Round	Algarve International Circuit	1 October	(United Kingdom) Jonathan Rea	(Turkey) Toprak Razgatlıoğlu	(Spain) Álvaro Bautista	Aruba.it Racing – Ducati	(Italy) Ducati	
11	R2	(Portugal) Pirelli Portuguese Round	Algarve International Circuit	1 October		(Spain) Álvaro Bautista	(Spain) Álvaro Bautista	Aruba.it Racing – Ducati	(Italy) Ducati	
12	R1	(Spain) Prometeon Spanish Round	Circuito de Jerez	28 October (Note: The Spanish round was added to the calendar on 2 August 2023. It replaced the Argentinian round which was cancelled due to political reasons.)	(Spain) Álvaro Bautista	(Turkey) Toprak Razgatlıoğlu	(Spain) Álvaro Bautista	Aruba.it Racing – Ducati	(Italy) Ducati	
12	SR	(Spain) Prometeon Spanish Round	Circuito de Jerez	29 October	(Spain) Álvaro Bautista	(Turkey) Toprak Razgatlıoğlu	(Spain) Álvaro Bautista	Aruba.it Racing – Ducati	(Italy) Ducati	
12	R2	(Spain) Prometeon Spanish Round	Circuito de Jerez	29 October		(United Kingdom) Jonathan Rea	(Spain) Álvaro Bautista	Aruba.it Racing – Ducati	(Italy) Ducati	

== Entry list ==
2023 entry list
Team	Constructor	Motorcycle	No.	Rider	Rounds
(Italy) Bmax Racing	BMW	M1000RR	16	(Italy) Gabriele Ruiu	3–5, 7, 10–12
(Germany) Bonovo Action BMW	BMW	M1000RR	31	(United States) Garrett Gerloff	All
(Germany) Bonovo Action BMW	BMW	M1000RR	76	(France) Loris Baz	All
(Germany) ROKiT BMW Motorrad WorldSBK Team	BMW	M1000RR	45	(United Kingdom) Scott Redding	All
(Germany) ROKiT BMW Motorrad WorldSBK Team	BMW	M1000RR	60	(Netherlands) Michael van der Mark	1–3, 8–12
(Germany) ROKiT BMW Motorrad WorldSBK Team	BMW	M1000RR	66	(United Kingdom) Tom Sykes	5–6
(Germany) ROKiT BMW Motorrad WorldSBK Team	BMW	M1000RR	75	(Portugal) Ivo Miguel Lopes	4
(Germany) ROKiT BMW Motorrad WorldSBK Team	BMW	M1000RR	91	(United Kingdom) Leon Haslam	7
(Italy) Aruba.it Racing – Ducati	Ducati	Panigale V4 R	1	(Spain) Álvaro Bautista	All
(Italy) Aruba.it Racing – Ducati	Ducati	Panigale V4 R	21	(Italy) Michael Ruben Rinaldi	All
(Italy) Barni Spark Racing Team	Ducati	Panigale V4 R	9	(Italy) Danilo Petrucci	All
(Italy) Motocorsa Racing	Ducati	Panigale V4 R	47	(Italy) Axel Bassani	All
(Italy) Team GoEleven	Ducati	Panigale V4 R	5	(Germany) Philipp Öttl	All
(Germany) Holzhauer Racing Promotion	Honda	CBR1000RR-R	61	(Germany) Florian Alt	12
(Japan) Team HRC	Honda	CBR1000RR-R	7	(Spain) Iker Lecuona	All
(Japan) Team HRC	Honda	CBR1000RR-R	97	(Spain) Xavi Vierge	All
(Japan) Petronas MIE Racing Honda Team	Honda	CBR1000RR-R	20	(Italy) Roberto Tamburini	7
(Japan) Petronas MIE Racing Honda Team	Honda	CBR1000RR-R	35	(Malaysia) Hafizh Syahrin	1–6, 9–12
(Japan) Petronas MIE Racing Honda Team	Honda	CBR1000RR-R	36	(Argentina) Leandro Mercado	12
(Japan) Petronas MIE Racing Honda Team	Honda	CBR1000RR-R	38	(Estonia) Hannes Soomer	8–9
(Japan) Petronas MIE Racing Honda Team	Honda	CBR1000RR-R	51	(Brazil) Eric Granado	1–4, 6–8, 10–11
(Japan) Petronas MIE Racing Honda Team	Honda	CBR1000RR-R	88	(Japan) Ryo Mizuno	5
(Italy) Kawasaki Puccetti Racing	Kawasaki	Ninja ZX-10RR	66	(United Kingdom) Tom Sykes	1–4
(Italy) Kawasaki Puccetti Racing	Kawasaki	Ninja ZX-10RR	53	(Spain) Tito Rabat	5–8, 10–12
(Italy) Kawasaki Puccetti Racing	Kawasaki	Ninja ZX-10RR	44	(France) Lucas Mahias	9
(Japan) Kawasaki Racing Team WorldSBK	Kawasaki	Ninja ZX-10RR	22	(United Kingdom) Alex Lowes	1–9, 11–12
(Japan) Kawasaki Racing Team WorldSBK	Kawasaki	Ninja ZX-10RR	65	(United Kingdom) Jonathan Rea	All
(Japan) Kawasaki Racing Team WorldSBK	Kawasaki	Ninja ZX-10RR	99	(France) Florian Marino	10
(Spain) Orelac Racing VerdNatura	Kawasaki	Ninja ZX-10RR	52	(Czech Republic) Oliver König	1–4, 6–12
(Spain) Orelac Racing VerdNatura	Kawasaki	Ninja ZX-10RR	70	(Italy) Luca Vitali	5
(Italy) TPR by Viñales Racing	Kawasaki	Ninja ZX-10RR	32	(Spain) Isaac Viñales	3–11
(France) GMT94 Yamaha	Yamaha	YZF-R1	34	(Italy) Lorenzo Baldassarri	All
(Italy) GYTR GRT Yamaha WorldSBK Team	Yamaha	YZF-R1	77	(Switzerland) Dominique Aegerter	All
(Italy) GYTR GRT Yamaha WorldSBK Team	Yamaha	YZF-R1	87	(Australia) Remy Gardner	All
(Japan) PATA Yamaha Prometeon WorldSBK	Yamaha	YZF-R1	54	(Turkey) Toprak Razgatlıoğlu	All
(Japan) PATA Yamaha Prometeon WorldSBK	Yamaha	YZF-R1	55	(Italy) Andrea Locatelli	All
(Italy) Yamaha Motoxracing WorldSBK Team	Yamaha	YZF-R1	20	(Italy) Roberto Tamburini	8
(Italy) Yamaha Motoxracing WorldSBK Team	Yamaha	YZF-R1	28	(United Kingdom) Bradley Ray	3–7, 9–11

Key
Regular rider
Wildcard rider
Replacement rider

=== Rider changes ===
==== Preseason ====
- Remy Gardner and Dominique Aegerter will race for GYTR GRT Yamaha WorldSBK Team, replacing Kohta Nozane and Garrett Gerloff. Gardner has raced in the MotoGP World Championship in 2022.
- Tom Sykes will return to the Superbike World Championship, joining Kawasaki Puccetti Racing. Sykes has raced in the British Superbike Championship in 2022.
- Danilo Petrucci will make his full-time debut with Barni Spark Racing Team.
- Garrett Gerloff will move to Bonovo Action BMW from GYTR GRT Yamaha WorldSBK Team, replacing Eugene Laverty.
- Isaac Viñales joined Team Pedercini, now in a partnership with Viñales Racing. They will miss the first two races because of sponsorship issues.

==== Midseason ====
- On May 2, ROKiT BMW Motorrad WorldSBK Team announced that Ivo Miguel Lopes would compete at the Catalunya round, substituting for Michael van der Mark who got diagnosed with a left femur fracture after a crash from the Dutch round.
- On May 9, Tom Sykes and Kawasaki Puccetti Racing announced their split after 4 rounds into the season. He will compete for ROKiT BMW Motorrad WorldSBK Team, substituting for the recovering Michael van der Mark.
- On May 25, Kawasaki Puccetti Racing announced that Tito Rabat would return to the WorldSBK grid, filling the seat of Tom Sykes who moved to ROKiT BMW Motorrad WorldSBK Team weeks prior.
- On May 31, Petronas MIE Racing Honda Team announced that Ryo Mizuno would make his WorldSBK debut at the Emilia-Romagna Round, substituting for the still-recovering Eric Granado.
- On June 1, Orelac Racing VerdNatura announced that Luca Vitali would make his WorldSBK debut at the Emilia-Romagna Round, substituting for the injured Oliver König .
- On July 27, Petronas MIE Racing Honda Team announced that Hannes Soomer would make his WorldSBK debut at the Czech Republic Round, substituting for the still-recovering Hafizh Syahrin.

== Championship standings ==
Points were awarded as follows:

Race 1 and Race 2

Position	**1st**	**2nd**	**3rd**	**4th**	**5th**	**6th**	**7th**	**8th**	**9th**	**10th**	**11th**	**12th**	**13th**	**14th**	**15th**
Points	25	20	16	13	11	10	9	8	7	6	5	4	3	2	1

Superpole Race

Position	**1st**	**2nd**	**3rd**	**4th**	**5th**	**6th**	**7th**	**8th**	**9th**
Points	12	9	7	6	5	4	3	2	1

=== Riders' championship ===
Pos.	Rider	Bike	PHI (Australia)			MAN (Indonesia)			ASS (Netherlands)			BAR (Spain)			MIS (Italy)			DON (United Kingdom)			IMO (Italy)			MOS (Czech Republic)			MAG (France)			ARA (Spain)			POR (Portugal)			JER (Spain)			Pts.
Pos.	Rider	Bike	R1	SR	R2	R1	SR	R2	R1	SR	R2	R1	SR	R2	R1	SR	R2	R1	SR	R2	R1	SR	R2	R1	SR	R2	R1	SR	R2	R1	SR	R2	R1	SR	R2	R1	SR	R2	Pts.
1	(Spain) Álvaro Bautista	Ducati	1	1	1	1	Ret	1	**1**	**1**	1	**1**	**1**	1	**1**	**1**	1	1	2	1	1	2	Ret	12	3	1	10	2	1	Ret	1	1	1	1	1	**1**	**1**	1	628
2	(Turkey) Toprak Razgatlıoğlu	Yamaha	**3**	**3**	Ret	**2**	**1**	2	3	3	2	2	2	2	3	2	2	2	1	2	**2**	**1**	1	**2**	**1**	Ret	1	1	2	2	3	2	2	2	2	2	4	2	552
3	(United Kingdom) Jonathan Rea	Kawasaki	2	7	8	9	4	Ret	2	2	Ret	3	Ret	5	5	5	4	**3**	**3**	5	3	4	3	1	2	3	3	3	3	**3**	**2**	4	**3**	**Ret**	10	4	3	21	370
4	(Italy) Andrea Locatelli	Yamaha	4	5	3	3	2	5	4	5	3	4	3	7	12	7	6	5	4	8	4	3	4	6	Ret	7	6	4	4	4	4	Ret	9	3	5	3	5	10	327
5	(Italy) Michael Ruben Rinaldi	Ducati	14	2	2	Ret	7	4	15	13	10	Ret	8	3	2	3	Ret	13	17	Ret	5	5	5	14	5	5	2	Ret	Ret	1	5	3	Ret	6	3	8	11	6	251
6	(Italy) Axel Bassani	Ducati	5	9	4	4	5	8	5	6	5	7	10	11	4	4	3	7	8	7	7	6	2	7	4	4	17	8	6	9	15	5	13	11	12	Ret	Ret	11	249
7	(Italy) Danilo Petrucci	Ducati	8	11	9	5	11	6	9	15	8	DSQ	11	12	Ret	NC	7	4	5	3	6	8	9	3	8	2	5	5	7	5	12	Ret	12	15	6	5	9	5	228
8	(Switzerland) Dominique Aegerter	Yamaha	13	Ret	7	8	10	12	6	7	4	5	6	8	6	21	11	12	11	11	Ret	14	12	8	11	11	11	6	Ret	15	14	12	14	14	8	18	2	3	163
9	(Australia) Remy Gardner	Yamaha	12	Ret	10	DNS	14	7	8	12	6	10	Ret	13	9	Ret	10	10	15	12	11	11	11	11	6	6	15	11	8	7	10	9	6	4	Ret	Ret	6	4	156
10	(Spain) Xavi Vierge	Honda	7	12	11	7	6	3	11	9	Ret	8	9	6	10	8	5	11	14	Ret	12	19	14	17	Ret	9	12	9	9	12	7	8	10	9	15	10	10	13	149
11	(United Kingdom) Alex Lowes	Kawasaki	Ret	4	Ret	10	3	13	7	4	9	Ret	5	4	7	6	Ret	6	6	6	9	7	Ret	9	7	14	8	Ret	DNS				5	Ret	DNS	7	Ret	DNS	149
12	(United States) Garrett Gerloff	BMW	10	15	14	14	12	11	12	17	12	9	7	10	13	9	8	Ret	7	9	13	Ret	13	Ret	9	20	**4**	**Ret**	5	8	9	10	4	8	4	14	Ret	9	144
13	(Spain) Iker Lecuona	Honda	6	8	6	12	16	9	Ret	11	Ret	6	4	9	8	NC	DNS	Ret	13	14	Ret	13	10	5	10	12	14	12	11	10	6	6	8	5	7	9	13	16	143
14	(United Kingdom) Scott Redding	BMW	9	14	13	Ret	9	10	10	8	7	Ret	12	Ret	11	11	14	8	9	4	10	9	8	4	13	8	7	20	Ret	11	11	14	15	13	14	Ret	Ret	8	126
15	(Germany) Philipp Öttl	Ducati	11	6	5	13	13	Ret	14	14	11	11	13	14	14	10	9	Ret	10	10	Ret	12	15	Ret	21	13	9	10	10	6	8	7	11	10	9	6	7	7	124
16	(France) Loris Baz	BMW	18	13	15	11	Ret	DNS	17	Ret	Ret	13	18	16	17	13	12	Ret	23	Ret	8	10	7	10	12	10	13	7	12	14	Ret	13	18	12	Ret	13	14	17	60
17	(Netherlands) Michael van der Mark	BMW	Ret	10	12	6	8	Ret	13	10	Ret													13	14	15	16	13	Ret	13	13	11	7	7	11	Ret	8	12	54
18	(Italy) Lorenzo Baldassarri	Yamaha	17	16	16	15	15	14	16	20	13	17	17	Ret	15	12	Ret	14	16	19	Ret	18	16	16	Ret	Ret	Ret	14	13	17	21	16	16	16	13	12	12	15	20
19	(United Kingdom) Bradley Ray	Yamaha							18	16	Ret	12	14	15	18	14	Ret	Ret	12	13	15	16	6				Ret	15	17	18	18	17	17	17	18				19
20	(United Kingdom) Tom Sykes	Kawasaki	Ret	20	Ret	18	Ret	Ret	Ret	19	15	16	19	Ret																									11
20	(United Kingdom) Tom Sykes	BMW													16	20	13	9	18	Ret																			11
21	(Malaysia) Hafizh Syahrin	Honda	15	19	17	16	17	15	19	18	14	14	16	Ret	Ret	15	15	17	19	15							18	18	14	19	19	Ret	20	19	Ret	15	16	18	11
22	(Spain) Tito Rabat	Kawasaki													19	16	Ret	16	20	Ret	16	20	Ret	15	15	18				Ret	17	18	19	18	16	11	15	14	8
23	(United Kingdom) Leon Haslam	BMW																			14	15	Ret																2
24	(France) Florian Marino	Kawasaki																												16	16	15							1
25	(Estonia) Hannes Soomer	Honda																						Ret	19	19	21	17	15										1
26	(Spain) Isaac Viñales	Kawasaki							23	Ret	18	Ret	20	Ret	20	17	16	15	21	16	Ret	22	Ret	18	16	17	Ret	19	16	20	20	20	Ret	20	17				1
27	(Portugal) Ivo Lopes	BMW										15	15	17																									1
	(Czech Republic) Oliver König	Kawasaki	Ret	17	18	17	18	Ret	20	23	16	Ret	DNS	DNS				18	22	17	Ret	23	Ret	20	20	Ret	20	21	18	22	22	21	23	DNS	DNS	16	17	23	0
	(Brazil) Eric Granado	Honda	16	18	19	DNS	19	DNS	21	21	17	Ret	DNS	DNS				19	24	18	Ret	24	19	Ret	17	Ret				Ret	Ret	19	21	DNS	DNS				0
	(Italy) Roberto Tamburini	Honda																			18	21	18																0
	(Italy) Roberto Tamburini	Yamaha																						19	18	16													0
	(Italy) Gabriele Ruiu	BMW							22	22	19	Ret	DNS	DNS	DNS	Ret	DNS				17	17	17							21	Ret	Ret	22	21	19	Ret	19	19	0
	(Italy) Luca Vitali	Kawasaki													Ret	18	Ret																						0
	(Argentina) Leandro Mercado	Honda																																		17	20	20	0
	(Japan) Ryo Mizuno	Honda													21	19	Ret																						0
	(France) Lucas Mahias	Kawasaki																									19	16	DNS										0
	(Germany) Florian Alt	Honda																																		19	18	22	0
Pos.	Rider	Bike	PHI (Australia)			MAN (Indonesia)			ASS (Netherlands)			BAR (Spain)			MIS (Italy)			DON (United Kingdom)			IMO (Italy)			MOS (Czech Republic)			MAG (France)			ARA (Spain)			POR (Portugal)			JER (Spain)			Pts.

Colour	Result
Gold	Winner
Silver	Second place
Bronze	Third place
Green	Points classification
Blue	Non-points classification
Blue	Non-classified finish (NC)
Purple	Retired, not classified (Ret)
Red	Did not qualify (DNQ)
Red	Did not pre-qualify (DNPQ)
Black	Disqualified (DSQ)
White	Did not start (DNS)
White	Withdrew (WD)
White	Race cancelled (C)
Blank	Did not practice (DNP)
Blank	Did not arrive (DNA)
Blank	Excluded (EX)

**Bold** – Pole position
Italics – Fastest lap

=== Teams' championship ===
Pos.	Team	Bike No.	PHI (Australia)			MAN (Indonesia)			ASS (Netherlands)			BAR (Spain)			MIS (Italy)			DON (United Kingdom)			IMO (Italy)			MOS (Czech Republic)			MAG (France)			ARA (Spain)			POR (Portugal)			JER (Spain)			Pts.
Pos.	Team	Bike No.	R1	SR	R2	R1	SR	R2	R1	SR	R2	R1	SR	R2	R1	SR	R2	R1	SR	R2	R1	SR	R2	R1	SR	R2	R1	SR	R2	R1	SR	R2	R1	SR	R2	R1	SR	R2	Pts.
1	Aruba.it Racing – Ducati	1	1	1	1	1	Ret	1	**1**	**1**	1	**1**	**1**	1	**1**	**1**	1	1	2	1	1	2	Ret	12	3	1	10	2	1	Ret	1	1	1	1	1	**1**	**1**	1	879
1	Aruba.it Racing – Ducati	21	14	2	2	Ret	7	4	15	13	10	Ret	8	3	2	3	Ret	13	17	Ret	5	5	5	14	5	5	2	Ret	Ret	1	5	3	Ret	6	3	8	11	6	879
2	Pata Yamaha Prometeon WorldSBK	54	**3**	**3**	Ret	**2**	**1**	2	3	3	2	2	2	2	3	2	2	2	1	2	**2**	**1**	1	**2**	**1**	Ret	1	1	2	2	3	2	2	2	2	2	4	2	879
2	Pata Yamaha Prometeon WorldSBK	55	4	5	3	3	2	5	4	5	3	4	3	7	12	7	6	5	4	8	4	3	4	6	Ret	7	6	4	4	4	4	Ret	9	3	5	3	5	10	879
3	Kawasaki Racing Team WorldSBK	22	Ret	4	Ret	10	3	13	7	4	9	Ret	5	4	7	6	Ret	6	6	6	9	7	Ret	9	7	14	8	Ret	DNS				5	Ret	DNS	7	Ret	DNS	518
3	Kawasaki Racing Team WorldSBK	65	2	7	8	9	4	Ret	2	2	Ret	3	Ret	5	5	5	4	**3**	**3**	5	3	4	3	1	2	3	3	3	3	**3**	**2**	4	**3**	**Ret**	10	4	3	21	518
3	Kawasaki Racing Team WorldSBK	99																												16	16	15							518
4	GYTR GRT Yamaha WorldSBK Team	77	13	Ret	7	8	10	12	6	7	4	5	6	8	6	21	11	12	11	11	Ret	14	12	8	11	11	11	6	DNS	15	14	12	14	14	8	18	2	3	321
4	GYTR GRT Yamaha WorldSBK Team	87	12	Ret	10	DNS	14	7	8	12	6	10	Ret	13	9	Ret	10	10	15	12	11	11	11	11	6	6	15	11	8	7	10	9	6	4	Ret	Ret	6	4	321
5	Team HRC	7	6	8	6	12	16	9	Ret	11	Ret	6	4	9	8	NC	DNS	Ret	13	14	Ret	13	10	5	10	12	14	12	11	10	6	6	8	5	7	9	13	16	292
5	Team HRC	97	7	12	11	7	6	3	11	9	Ret	8	9	6	10	8	5	11	14	Ret	12	19	14	17	Ret	9	12	9	9	12	7	8	10	9	15	10	11	13	292
6	Motocorsa Racing	47	5	9	4	4	5	8	5	6	5	7	10	11	4	4	3	7	8	7	7	6	2	7	4	4	17	8	6	9	15	5	13	11	12	Ret	Ret	11	249
7	Barni Spark Racing Team	9	8	11	9	5	11	6	9	15	8	DSQ	11	12	Ret	NC	7	4	5	3	6	8	9	3	8	2	5	5	7	5	12	Ret	12	15	6	5	9	5	228
8	Bonovo Action BMW	31	10	15	14	14	12	11	12	17	12	9	7	10	13	9	8	Ret	7	9	13	Ret	13	Ret	9	20	**4**	**Ret**	5	8	9	10	4	8	4	14	Ret	9	204
8	Bonovo Action BMW	76	18	13	15	11	Ret	DNS	17	Ret	Ret	13	18	16	17	13	12	Ret	23	Ret	8	10	7	10	12	10	13	7	12	14	Ret	13	18	12	Ret	13	14	17	204
9	ROKiT BMW Motorrad WorldSBK Team	45	9	14	13	Ret	9	10	10	8	7	Ret	12	Ret	11	11	14	8	9	4	10	9	8	4	13	8	7	20	Ret	11	11	14	15	13	14	Ret	Ret	8	193
9	ROKiT BMW Motorrad WorldSBK Team	60	Ret	10	12	6	8	Ret	13	10	Ret													13	14	15	16	13	Ret	13	13	11	7	7	11	Ret	8	12	193
9	ROKiT BMW Motorrad WorldSBK Team	66													16	20	13	9	18	Ret																			193
9	ROKiT BMW Motorrad WorldSBK Team	75										15	15	17																									193
9	ROKiT BMW Motorrad WorldSBK Team	91																			14	15	Ret																193
10	Team Goeleven	5	11	6	5	13	13	Ret	14	14	11	11	13	14	14	10	9	Ret	10	10	Ret	12	15	Ret	21	13	9	10	10	6	8	7	11	10	9	6	7	7	124
11	GMT94 Yamaha	34	17	16	16	15	15	14	16	20	13	17	17	Ret	15	12	Ret	14	16	19	Ret	18	16	16	Ret	Ret	Ret	14	14	17	21	16	16	16	13	12	12	15	15
12	Yamaha Motoxracing WorldSBK Team	20																						19	18	16													19
12	Yamaha Motoxracing WorldSBK Team	28							18	16	Ret	12	14	15	18	14	Ret	Ret	12	13	15	16	6				Ret	15	17	18	18	17	17	17	18				19
13	Petronas MIE Racing Honda Team	20																			18	21	18																12
13	Petronas MIE Racing Honda Team	35	15	19	17	16	17	15	19	18	14	14	16	Ret	Ret	15	15	17	19	15										19	19	19	20	19	Ret	15	16	18	12
13	Petronas MIE Racing Honda Team	36																																		17	20	20	12
13	Petronas MIE Racing Honda Team	38																			18	18	14	Ret	19	19													12
13	Petronas MIE Racing Honda Team	51	16	18	19	DNS	19	DNS	21	21	17	Ret	DNS	DNS				19	24	18	Ret	24	19	Ret	17	Ret				Ret	Ret	19	21	DNS	DNS				12
13	Petronas MIE Racing Honda Team	88													21	19	Ret																						12
14	Kawasaki Puccetti Racing	44																									16	19	DNS										9
14	Kawasaki Puccetti Racing	53													19	16	Ret	16	20	Ret	16	20	Ret	15	15	18				Ret	17	18	19	18	16	11	15	14	9
14	Kawasaki Puccetti Racing	66	Ret	20	Ret	18	Ret	Ret	Ret	19	15	16	19	Ret																									9
15	TPR by Viñales Racing	32							23	Ret	18	Ret	20	Ret	20	17	16	15	21	16	Ret	22	Ret	18	16	17	Ret	19	16	20	20	20	Ret	20	17				1
	Orelac Racing VerdNatura	52	Ret	17	18	17	18	Ret	20	23	16	Ret	DNS	DNS				18	22	17	Ret	23	Ret	20	20	Ret	20	21	18	22	22	21	23	DNS	DNS	16	17	23	0
	Orelac Racing VerdNatura	70													Ret	18	Ret																						0
	Bmax Racing	16							22	22	19	Ret	DNS	DNS	DNS	Ret	DNS				17	17	17							21	Ret	Ret	22	21	19				0
	Holzhauer Racing Promotion	61																																		19	18	22	0
Pos.	Team	Bike No.	PHI (Australia)			MAN (Indonesia)			ASS (Netherlands)			BAR (Spain)			MIS (Italy)			DON (United Kingdom)			IMO (Italy)			MOS (Czech Republic)			MAG (France)			ARA (Spain)			POR (Portugal)			JER (Spain)			Pts.

=== Manufacturers' championship ===
Pos.	Manufacturer	PHI (Australia)			MAN (Indonesia)			ASS (Netherlands)			BAR (Spain)			MIS (Italy)			DON (United Kingdom)			IMO (Italy)			MOS (Czech Republic)			MAG (France)			ARA (Spain)			POR (Portugal)			JER (Spain)			Pts.
Pos.	Manufacturer	R1	SR	R2	R1	SR	R2	R1	SR	R2	R1	SR	R2	R1	SR	R2	R1	SR	R2	R1	SR	R2	R1	SR	R2	R1	SR	R2	R1	SR	R2	R1	SR	R2	R1	SR	R2	Pts.
1	(Italy) Ducati	1	1	1	1	5	1	1	1	1	1	1	1	1	1	1	1	2	1	1	2	2	3	3	1	2	2	1	1	1	1	1	1	1	1	1	1	704
2	(Japan) Yamaha	3	3	3	2	1	2	3	3	2	2	2	2	3	2	2	2	1	2	2	1	1	2	1	6	1	1	2	2	3	2	2	2	2	2	2	2	581
3	(Japan) Kawasaki	2	4	8	9	3	13	2	2	9	3	5	4	5	5	4	3	3	5	3	4	3	1	2	3	3	3	3	3	2	4	3	18	10	4	5	14	391
4	(Germany) BMW	9	10	12	6	8	10	10	8	7	9	7	10	11	9	8	8	7	4	8	9	7	4	9	8	4	7	5	8	9	10	4	7	4	13	8	8	224
5	(Japan) Honda	6	8	6	7	6	3	11	9	14	6	4	6	8	8	5	11	13	14	12	13	10	5	10	9	12	9	9	10	6	6	8	5	7	14	10	13	205
Pos.	Manufacturer	PHI (Australia)			MAN (Indonesia)			ASS (Netherlands)			BAR (Spain)			MIS (Italy)			DON (United Kingdom)			IMO (Italy)			MOS (Czech Republic)			MAG (France)			ARA (Spain)			POR (Portugal)			JER (Spain)			Pts.
