= Álvaro Bautista =

Spanish motorcycle racer (born 1984)

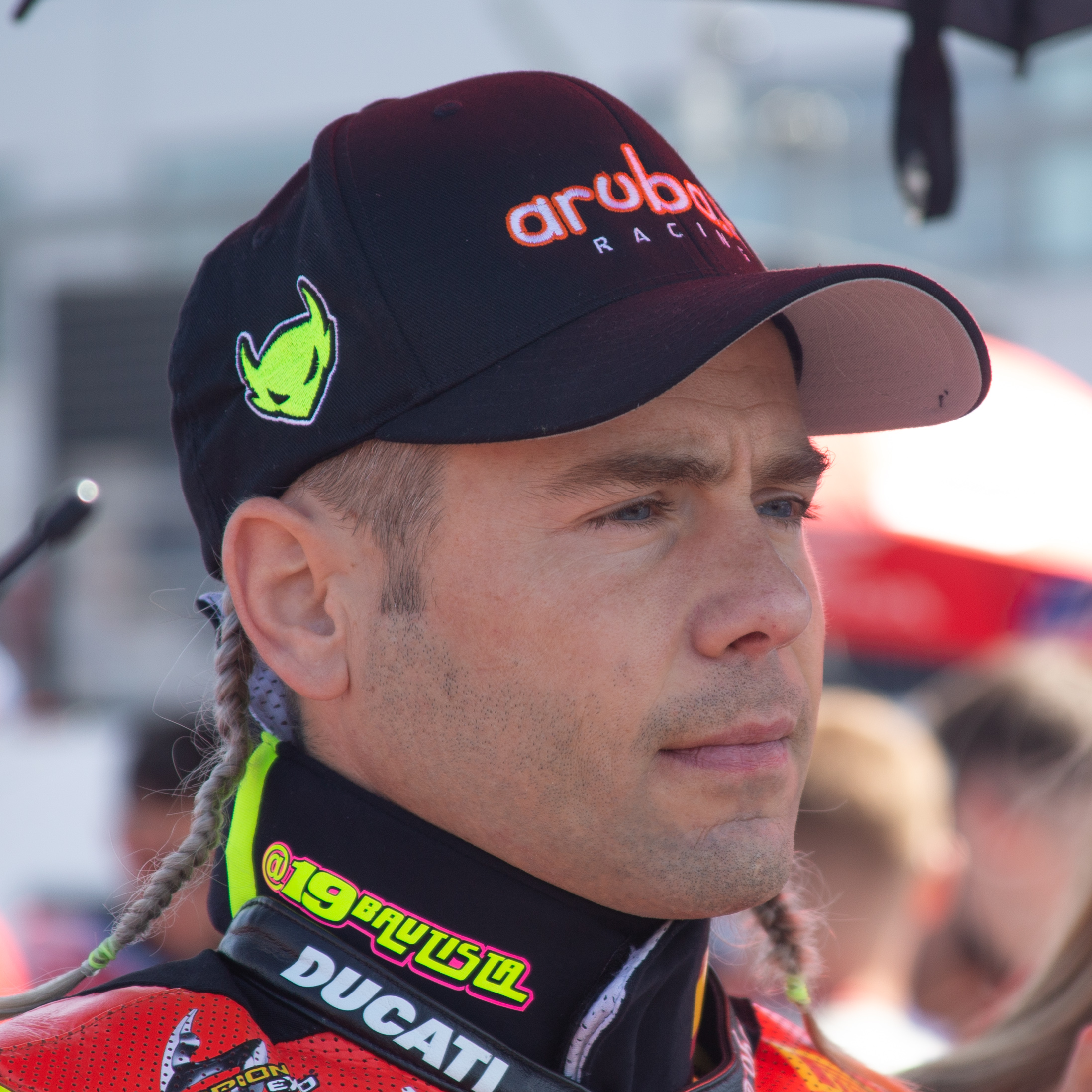
- Bautista at Donington Park in 2022
- Nationality: Spanish
- Born: 21 November 1984 (age 41); Talavera de la Reina, Spain
- Current team: Barni Spark Racing Team
- Bike number: 19
Motorcycle racing career statistics
MotoGP World Championship
Active years	2010–2018, 2023
Manufacturers	Suzuki (2010–2011); Honda (2012–2014); Aprilia (2015–2016); Ducati (2017–2018, 2023)
Championships	0
2023 championship position	31st (0 pts)
Starts / Wins / Podiums / Poles / F. laps / Points; 159 / 0 / 3 / 1 / 1 / 883
250cc World Championship
Active years	2007–2009
Manufacturers	Aprilia
Championships	0
2009 championship position	4th (218 pts)
Starts / Wins / Podiums / Poles / F. laps / Points; 49 / 8 / 28 / 9 / 12 / 643
125cc World Championship
Active years	2002–2006
Manufacturers	Honda, Aprilia
Championships	1 (2006)
2006 championship position	1st (338 pts)
Starts / Wins / Podiums / Poles / F. laps / Points; 67 / 8 / 18 / 8 / 9 / 545
Superbike World Championship
Active years	2019–
Manufacturers	Ducati (2019, 2022–); Honda (2020–2021)
Championships	2 (2022, 2023)
2026 championship position	9th (167 pts)
Starts / Wins / Podiums / Poles / F. laps / Points; 273 / 63 / 129 / 10 / 57 / 2896

Álvaro Bautista Arce (born 21 November 1984) is a Spanish motorcycle road racer. He won the 2022 and 2023 Superbike World Championship with the Ducati factory team. He was the 2006 125cc World Champion and runner-up in 250cc, and finished in the top six in MotoGP in 2012 and 2013. He competed in the MotoGP class from 2010 to 2018.

Bautista competed for the Suzuki team in his first two years after moving to the MotoGP class in 2010. He moved to the Honda-equipped Gresini Racing team in 2012, and continued with the team using Aprilia machinery when the factory returned to MotoGP for the 2015 season. Bautista then rode a Ducati with the Aspar (then Ángel Nieto) MotoGP team in 2017 and 2018, before moving to the Superbike World Championship for 2019.

After the 2019 World Superbike season with the factory Ducati team, for 2020 and 2021, Bautista was contracted to ride the Honda Fireblade in World Superbikes, with the team being run under full HRC control.

== Career ==
=== Early career ===
Born in Talavera de la Reina, Castile-La Mancha, Bautista rode a motorcycle for the first time at three years of age. His father owned a motorcycle repair shop and built his first bike from scratch; Bautista competed in his first race five years later. In only his second season he finished runner-up in the Madrid Minimoto Championship and then went on to win the championship three years in a row. In 1997, he simultaneously raced in the 50cc Aprilia Cup where he claimed his first podium, finishing the season in sixth place.

Another year in the 50cc Aprilia Cup saw Bautista taking two more podiums and ending the season in third place when Alberto Puig chose him from over 4000 applicants for the now famous Movistar Activa Joven Cup in 1999. He finished his first year in fifth place, ahead of Dani Pedrosa, earning him a second year in the Cup and a place as a back-up rider for the 125cc Spanish Championship.

However, injury the following year set Bautista back and despite taking one podium in the Movistar Cup, he only finished the season in ninth place. In 2001, he entered the 125cc Spanish Championship with Team Belart which folded halfway through the season due to financial reasons. However, he was spotted by Manuel Morente who signed him up for the remaining races of the season and offered him a new team with iconic Atlético Madrid sponsoring for the following year.

In 2002, finally having official material at his disposal, Bautista fought with Hector Barbera for the 125cc Spanish Championship until the last race of the season at Valencia. He set pole-position, but only finished fifth after a crash, securing him the runner-up spot overall. The same year, Bautista made his international debut in the 2002 Grand Prix motorcycle racing season with the same team, running as a wildcard entry at Jerez, Catalunya and Valencia. He also competed in the 125cc European Championship where he scored a podium in Assen and a fourth place in Hungary.

=== 125cc World Championship ===
==== 2003 ====
Bautista's connection with football was deepened in 2003 when former footballer Clarence Seedorf signed him up for the newly found Seedorf Racing Team, to compete his first full season in the 125cc World Championship. He finished his debut year in 20th place overall with 31 points, his best finishes being a fourth place at Phillip Island and a sixth place at Valencia. The same year, he was also crowned the 125cc Spanish Champion with two races to go and after an extremely dominant season, never being off the podium and scoring five consecutive pole-to-victory finishes.

==== 2004 ====
Bautista continued with Seedorf Racing in the 125cc World Championship for the 2004 season. He ended the year in seventh place overall after taking his first podium and fastest lap at Donington Park. He finished on the podium a total of four times, with a second place at Donington Park and thirds at Qatar, Malaysia and Valencia.

==== 2005 ====
With the main contenders leaving the class, Bautista started the 2005 season as one of the 125cc title favourites. However, a manufacturer switch from Aprilia to Honda, a different team structure, crashes and mechanical failures saw him struggle throughout a disappointing season which he finished in 15th place.

==== 2006 ====
After difficulties to get out of his contract with Seedorf Racing, Bautista joined the ranks of Jorge Martinez’ MVA Aspar Team only shortly before the start of the 2006 season. Already having a complete 125cc team with four riders before the signing of Bautista, Martinez still managed to provide another bike, mechanics and sponsors for the Talaverano who he had already tried to sign up two years earlier.

The effort paid off handsomely as Bautista went on to take his first 125cc victory at the inaugural 2006 Grand Prix in Jerez, leading the race from start to finish. Another dominant win followed in Qatar, making him the first 125cc rider in four years to win back-to-back races. His excellent form continued until the end of the year, leading the championship table with a great margin from start to finish and eventually becoming 125cc World Champion in Australia, three races before the end of the season. Along the way, he took eight wins and broke numerous records, including the highest number of points in the class and most podium finishes in a single season. He stood on the rostrum in 14 out of 16 races. The only times he didn't finish on the podium, he finished in fourth place. In both Le Mans and Valencia, he was leading the race before mechanical problems saw him drop down the field.

=== 250cc World Championship ===
==== 2007 ====
For the 2007 Grand Prix motorcycle racing season, Bautista continued with the Aspar Team, moving up to the 250cc class. He took his first 250cc victory at the 2007 Italian Grand Prix at Mugello on 3 June, also claiming his maiden 250cc pole position that weekend. A second 250cc victory came in Estoril on 16 September in the Portuguese Grand Prix, where – having started from sixth on the grid - he dropped to 12th during the first lap to carve his way through the field and eventually take an easy win. He finally ended the 2007 season fourth overall in the Championship and was subsequently awarded the MotoGP / FIM "Rookie of the Year" Award for the 250cc class.

==== 2008 ====
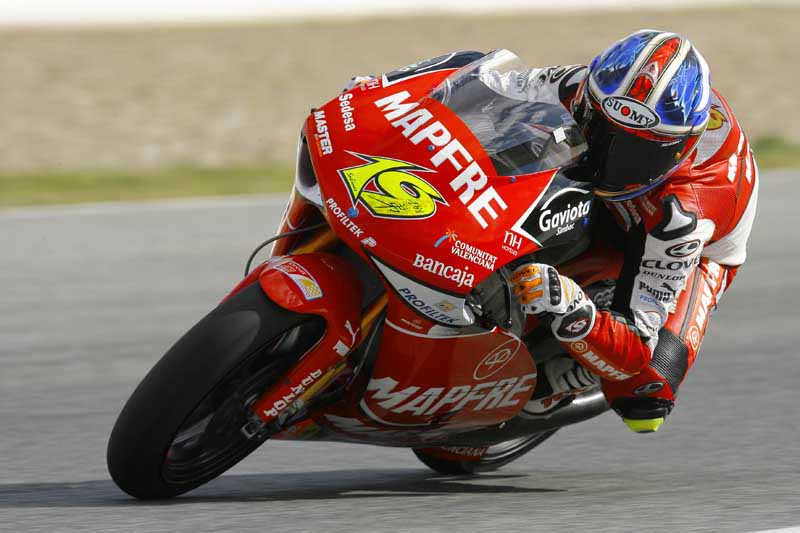
Bautista in 2008

Having been tipped as the 2008 250cc champion, he finished sixth in the season opener in Qatar. At Jerez, he looked set to win before his engine gave out on the final lap causing Marco Simoncelli to hit his bike and both riders to crash out, subsequently handing Mika Kallio the win. Bautista finally took his first win of the season at Estoril before he crashed out of the lead in China and Italy, while only finishing 14th in Le Mans.

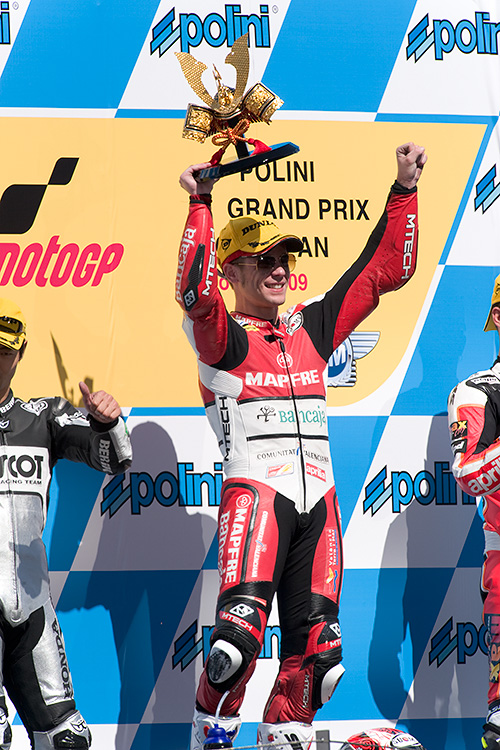
Bautista after winning the 2009 Japanese Grand Prix

In Bautista's home race at the Catalunya circuit, he dominated the qualifying sessions, took pole position and led the race from the start, but an error while switching gears in the last lap gave Marco Simoncelli the chance to pass him and left him unable to fight back before the finish line. The British round at Donington marked his fourth pole of the season. In another fight with Simoncelli, Bautista missed the top spot again after an overly optimistic passing manoeuver by Simoncelli in the penultimate lap, which caused both riders to go wide and allowed Mika Kallio to pass them and snatch the win again. A second win came at Assen, despite a bad start from pole position leaving him eighth at the end of lap 1. He added two more wins at San Marino and Malaysia and his string of ten podium finishes after the abysmal start to the year eventually saw him end the season in second place behind Simoncelli.

==== 2009 ====
Bautista started 2009 with a strong showing of speed by taking three of the first five pole positions, but without converting any of them into a victory. Wins in Japan and Catalunya along a more steady start than the previous year moved him to the top of the championship, but an ultimately very costly collision with Hiroshi Aoyama in the final laps of the Assen Grand Prix handed the lead to the Japanese rider. A run of five successive podium finishes kept Bautista in the running for the championship, but a crash out of fourth place at Estoril due to a gearbox issue and errors at Phillip Island and Sepang finally dashed his title hopes with Hiroshi Aoyama going on to win the final 250cc championship for Honda.

=== MotoGP World Championship ===
==== 2010 ====
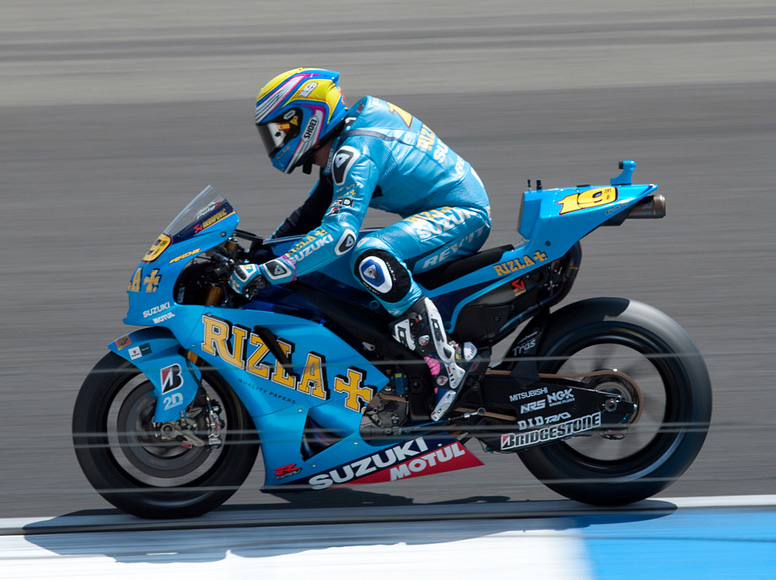
Bautista at the 2010 Dutch TT

Bautista moved up to MotoGP for the 2010 season, with the factory Suzuki team. After missing the French Grand Prix due to injury, Bautista made a steady return to the class and finished fifth at the Catalan Grand Prix.

==== 2011 ====
During practice for the 2011 MotoGP season opener in Qatar, Bautista suffered a broken left femur as a result of a crash at turn 15. Bautista proved on numerous occasions the potential of the Suzuki GSV-R, and almost claimed podium finishes at several races. His biggest flaw was arguably his tendency to crash, often while fighting for podium positions. He eventually finished the season 13th in the championship standings.

==== 2012 ====
On 9 November 2011, it was announced that Bautista would move to Gresini Racing for the 2012 season. He replaced the late Marco Simoncelli and the World Superbike bound Hiroshi Aoyama. He would later be joined by Gresini's Moto2 rider Michele Pirro, who would ride a CRT specification FTR-Honda as opposed to Bautista, who would ride a MotoGP specification Honda. Bautista finished each of the first five races inside the top ten; of those races, his best result was sixth place on three occasions. Bautista achieved his first pole position in MotoGP at the British Grand Prix; he finished a tenth of a second clear of Ben Spies and Casey Stoner, who both joined Bautista on the front row. Bautista could not maintain the lead at the start of the race, after Spies led into the first corner; he recovered to finish in fourth place – behind Jorge Lorenzo, Stoner and Dani Pedrosa – which was his then best result in the MotoGP class.

At Assen, Bautista qualified eighth, but made a slow start and tried to alleviate his losses by braking late for the first turn. He locked the front wheel, and fell from his bike, taking down championship leader Lorenzo in the process. Both bikes slid along the ground, with Lorenzo's throttle jammed open, which blew the engine. Lorenzo lost his 25-point lead in the championship, after Stoner won the race; Yamaha lodged a complaint with race direction, stating that Bautista's actions were dangerous, and he was thus given a grid penalty for the German Grand Prix – starting last on the grid – for his actions.

Bautista finished the next five races within the top-ten each time, before achieving his first ever MotoGP podium at Misano. He obtained another podium finish two races later at Motegi, after a race long battle with Briton Cal Crutchlow ended with Crutchlow running out of fuel before the race finish.

==== 2013 ====
In 2013, Bautista continued riding for Team Gresini, with a new sponsor GO & FUN and teammate Bryan Staring. Bautista had a good season, battling consistently amongst the second group of riders, along with Valentino Rossi, Cal Crutchlow and Stefan Bradl. He finished sixth overall in the championship behind Crutchlow and in front of Bradl, with a best result of fourth obtained on three occasions, at Laguna Seca, Aragon and Motegi.

==== 2014 ====
For the 2014 season, Bautista was joined by new teammate Scott Redding, but had a difficult start to the 2014 season, crashing out of each of the first three events on the calendar. He obtained his first championship points of the season with a sixth place in the Spanish Grand Prix, at Jerez. This was followed by a third-place finish in the French Grand Prix, his first podium since the 2012 Japanese Grand Prix.

==== 2015 ====
For the 2015 season, Bautista remained with the Gresini team – now riding an Aprilia – where he was joined by new teammate Marco Melandri. At the midway point of the season, Bautista had collected 13 points, and finished 16th in the riders' championship with 31 points.

==== 2018 ====
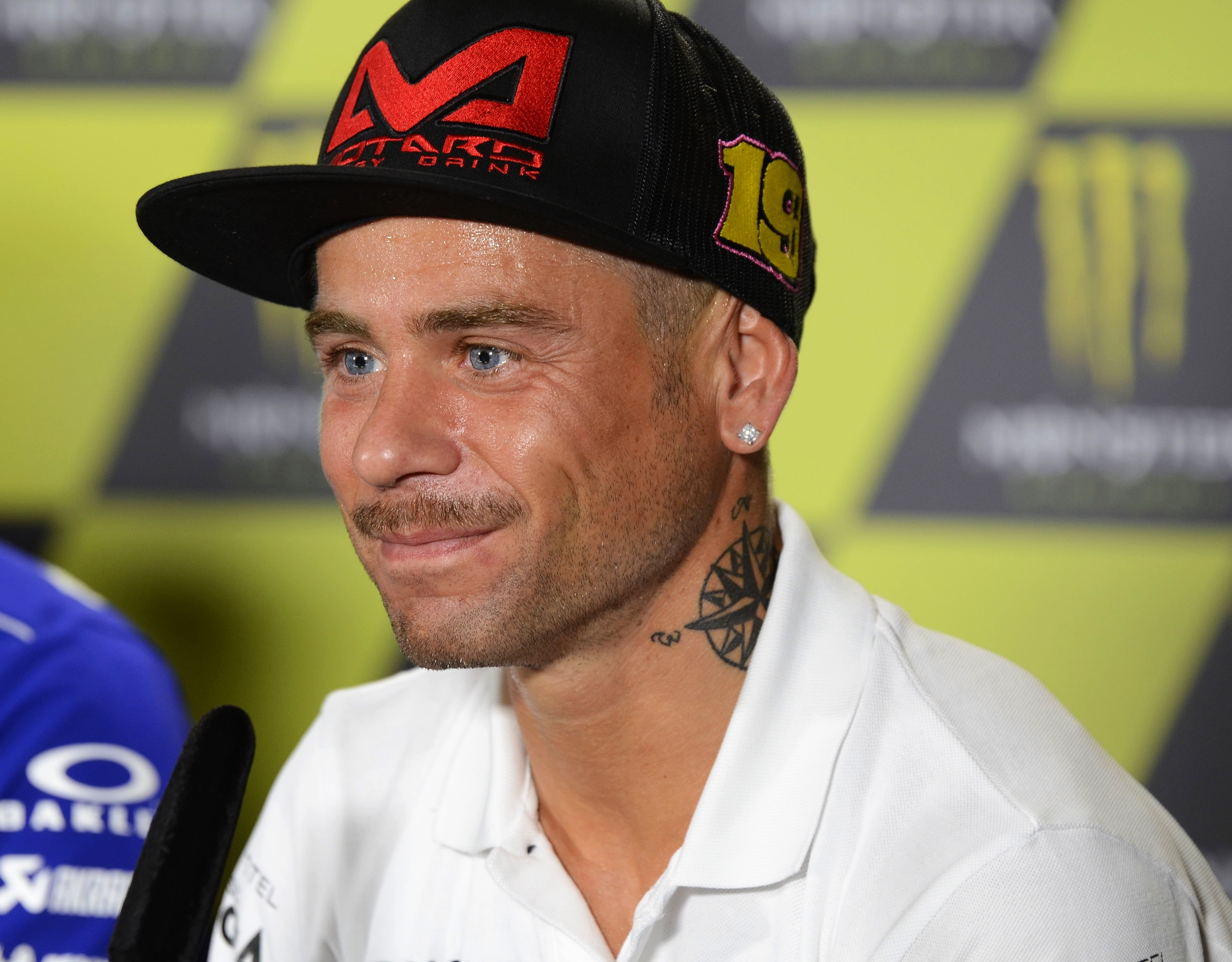
Bautista in 2018

In August, Bautista confirmed he would be departing MotoGP following nine seasons, changing to World Superbike with the factory Ducati team in 2019.

Following Jorge Lorenzo pulling out of his third race at Phillip Island in Australia due to injury, Bautista replaced him for Ducati for the Australian Grand Prix weekend before returning to the Ángel Nieto Team for the final two Grands Prix of the season.

==== 2023 ====
After winning consecutive WSBK world titles, Bautista had a wildcard entry in November's Malaysian GP with the Aruba.it Racing team. This was the first time he had competed in MotoGP since the 2018 season, finishing the two races in 22nd and 17th positions. He later confirmed he was suffering from injuries received during a previous test.

=== Superbike World Championship ===
==== 2019 ====
Entering the World Superbike Championship with the factory Ducati World Superbike team, Bautista made a record-breaking debut in the class. Winning his very first race at Phillip Island with a gap of almost 15 seconds, he then went on to claim 11 consecutive victories, a new class record. However, a string of crashes in the second half of the season and a shoulder injury picked up during the Laguna Seca round prevented him from taking the title, eventually finishing his Rookie season as runner-up to Jonathan Rea with a total of 16 wins.

==== 2020 ====
Despite his initial success with the Ducati, Bautista made a surprise move to the new factory Honda team for the 2020 season. With bike development made more difficult due to the COVID-19 pandemic, Bautista struggled throughout the year on underperforming machinery, scoring the only HRC podium of the season in Race 2 at Aragon and finishing the shortened season in ninth place.

==== 2021 ====
Staying with HRC for the 2021 season, Bautista showed flashes of brilliance on the still markedly subpar machinery. However, two third places - in the Catalunya Superpole race and Race 2 in Jerez - would remain the highlights of the year. Despite coming close to the podium on several more occasions, he finished the season down in tenth place. With bike development continuing only in small steps - too slow for a rider at his age - Bautista decided not to renew his contract with HRC for 2022.

==== 2022 ====
Bautista returned to the Aruba.it Ducati official factory team for the 2022 season. After two difficult seasons on underperforming Honda machinery, he was immediately competitive again and led the championship from the first round of the season in Aragon. He finally managed to become the 2022 World Superbike champion with one round to spare in the Mandalika round, taking 31 podiums and 16 wins in total.

==== 2023 ====
For 2023, Bautista stayed with the factory Ducati squad. He enjoyed another dominant season with a total of 27 victories and breaking multiple records on the way to a second World Superbike title. With this, he became the first Ducati rider to defend his title since Carl Fogarty in 1999. He would continue with the same team for the 2024 season.

== Career statistics ==
=== Grand Prix motorcycle racing ===
==== By season ====
Season	Class	Motorcycle	Team	Race	Win	Podium	Pole	FLap	Pts	Plcd	WCh
2002	125cc	Aprilia	Atlético de Madrid	3	0	0	0	0	0	NC	–
2003	125cc	Aprilia	Seedorf Racing	16	0	0	0	0	31	20th	–
2004	125cc	Aprilia	Seedorf Racing	16	0	4	0	1	129	7th	–
2005	125cc	Honda	Seedorf – Tiempo Holidays	16	0	0	0	1	47	15th	–
2006	125cc	Aprilia	Master – MVA Aspar	16	8	14	8	7	338	**1st**	1
2007	250cc	Aprilia	Master – Mapfre Aspar	17	2	7	1	1	181	4th	–
2008	250cc	Aprilia	Mapfre Aspar Team	16	4	11	5	7	244	**2nd**	–
2009	250cc	Aprilia	Mapfre Aspar Team	16	2	10	3	4	218	4th	–
2010	MotoGP	Suzuki	Rizla Suzuki MotoGP	17	0	0	0	0	85	13th	–
2011	MotoGP	Suzuki	Rizla Suzuki MotoGP	15	0	0	0	0	67	13th	–
2012	MotoGP	Honda	San Carlo Honda Gresini	18	0	2	1	0	178	5th	–
2013	MotoGP	Honda	GO&FUN Honda Gresini	18	0	0	0	0	171	6th	–
2014	MotoGP	Honda	GO&FUN Honda Gresini	18	0	1	0	1	89	11th	–
2015	MotoGP	Aprilia	Aprilia Racing Team Gresini	18	0	0	0	0	31	16th	–
2016	MotoGP	Aprilia	Aprilia Racing Team Gresini	18	0	0	0	0	82	12th	–
2017	MotoGP	Ducati	Pull&Bear Aspar Team	18	0	0	0	0	75	12th	–
2018	MotoGP	Ducati	Ángel Nieto Team	17	0	0	0	0	105	12th	–
2018	MotoGP	Ducati	Ducati Team	1	0	0	0	0	105	12th	–
2023	MotoGP	Ducati	Aruba.it Racing	1	0	0	0	0	0	31st	
Total				**275**	**16**	**49**	**18**	**22**	**2071**		**1**

==== By class ====
Class	Seasons	1st GP	1st pod	1st win	Race	Win	Podiums	Pole	FLap	Pts	WChmp
125cc	2002–2006	2002 Spain	2004 Great Britain	2006 Spain	67	8	18	8	9	545	1
250cc	2007–2009	2007 Qatar	2007 Spain	2007 Italy	49	8	28	9	12	643	0
MotoGP	2010–2018, 2023	2010 Qatar	2012 San Marino		159	0	3	1	1	883	0
Total	2002–2018, 2023				**275**	**16**	**49**	**18**	**22**	**2071**	**1**

==== Races by year ====
(key) (Races in bold indicate pole position, races in italics indicate fastest lap)

Year	Class	Bike	1	2	3	4	5	6	7	8	9	10	11	12	13	14	15	16	17	18	19	20	Pos	Pts
2002	125cc	Aprilia	JPN	RSA	SPA; 25	FRA	ITA	CAT; Ret	NED	GBR	GER	CZE	POR	RIO	PAC	MAL	AUS	VAL; 23					NC	0
2003	125cc	Aprilia	JPN; 18	RSA; 25	SPA; 17	FRA; Ret	ITA; 28	CAT; 28	NED; Ret	GBR; 14	GER; Ret	CZE; 16	POR; 15	RIO; 16	PAC; 12	MAL; 15	AUS; 4	VAL; 6					20th	31
2004	125cc	Aprilia	RSA; 9	SPA; Ret	FRA; 9	ITA; Ret	CAT; 6	NED; 16	RIO; 9	GER; 7	GBR; 2	CZE; 13	POR; 5	JPN; Ret	QAT; 3	MAL; 3	AUS; 9	VAL; 3					7th	129
2005	125cc	Honda	SPA; Ret	POR; 7	CHN; 17	FRA; Ret	ITA; 12	CAT; 14	NED; 4	GBR; Ret	GER; Ret	CZE; 12	JPN; 9	MAL; 26	QAT; 22	AUS; 16	TUR; 12	VAL; 12					15th	47
2006	125cc	Aprilia	SPA; 1	**QAT**; 1	**TUR**; 2	CHN; 3	FRA; 4	ITA; 2	**CAT**; 1	NED; 3	**GBR**; 1	GER; 2	CZE; 1	**MAL**; 1	AUS; 1	**JPN**; 2	**POR**; 1	**VAL**; 4					1st	338
2007	250cc	Aprilia	QAT; Ret	SPA; 2	TUR; 3	CHN; 2	FRA; 8	**ITA**; 1	CAT; 5	GBR; Ret	NED; 3	GER; 17	CZE; 5	RSM; 8	POR; 1	JPN; 15	AUS; 2	MAL; Ret	VAL; Ret				4th	181
2008	250cc	Aprilia	QAT; 6	**SPA**; Ret	POR; 1	**CHN**; 12	FRA; 14	ITA; Ret	**CAT**; 2	**GBR**; 3	**NED**; 1	GER; 3	CZE; 2	RSM; 1	INP; C	JPN; 2	AUS; 2	MAL; 1	VAL; 3				2nd	244
2009	250cc	Aprilia	**QAT**; 7	JPN; 1	SPA; 2	**FRA**; 4	**ITA**; 3	CAT; 1	NED; Ret	GER; 3	GBR; 2	CZE; 3	INP; 3	RSM; 3	POR; Ret	AUS; 10	MAL; Ret	VAL; 2					4th	218
2010	MotoGP	Suzuki	QAT; Ret	SPA; 10	FRA; DNS	ITA; 14	GBR; 12	NED; 14	CAT; 5	GER; Ret	USA; Ret	CZE; Ret	INP; 8	RSM; 8	ARA; 8	JPN; 7	MAL; 5	AUS; 12	POR; 11	VAL; 9			13th	85
2011	MotoGP	Suzuki	QAT; DNS	SPA	POR; 13	FRA; 12	CAT; 12	GBR; 5	NED; 11	ITA; 13	GER; 7	USA; Ret	CZE; Ret	INP; 6	RSM; 8	ARA; 6	JPN; Ret	AUS; Ret	MAL; C	VAL; Ret			13th	67
2012	MotoGP	Honda	QAT; 7	SPA; 6	POR; 6	FRA; 10	CAT; 6	**GBR**; 4	NED; Ret	GER; 7	ITA; 10	USA; 8	INP; 5	CZE; 6	RSM; 3	ARA; 6	JPN; 3	MAL; 6	AUS; 5	VAL; 4			5th	178
2013	MotoGP	Honda	QAT; 6	AME; 8	SPA; 6	FRA; 6	ITA; Ret	CAT; Ret	NED; 7	GER; 5	USA; 4	INP; 6	CZE; 5	GBR; 5	RSM; 7	ARA; 4	MAL; 5	AUS; 5	JPN; 4	VAL; 5			6th	171
2014	MotoGP	Honda	QAT; Ret	AME; Ret	ARG; Ret	SPA; 6	FRA; 3	ITA; 8	CAT; Ret	NED; 7	GER; 9	INP; Ret	CZE; 10	GBR; Ret	RSM; 8	ARA; 7	JPN; 10	AUS; 6	MAL; Ret	VAL; 16			11th	89
2015	MotoGP	Aprilia	QAT; Ret	AME; 15	ARG; 19	SPA; 15	FRA; 15	ITA; 14	CAT; 10	NED; 17	GER; 14	INP; 18	CZE; 13	GBR; 10	RSM; 15	ARA; 13	JPN; 16	AUS; 14	MAL; 15	VAL; 14			16th	31
2016	MotoGP	Aprilia	QAT; 13	ARG; 10	AME; 11	SPA; Ret	FRA; 9	ITA; Ret	CAT; 8	NED; Ret	GER; 10	AUT; 16	CZE; 16	GBR; 10	RSM; 10	ARA; 9	JPN; 7	AUS; 12	MAL; 7	VAL; 10			12th	82
2017	MotoGP	Ducati	QAT; Ret	ARG; 4	AME; 15	SPA; Ret	FRA; Ret	ITA; 5	CAT; 7	NED; Ret	GER; 6	CZE; Ret	AUT; 8	GBR; 10	RSM; 12	ARA; 8	JPN; Ret	AUS; 17	MAL; 11	VAL; Ret			12th	75
2018	MotoGP	Ducati	QAT; 13	ARG; 16	AME; 15	SPA; 8	FRA; Ret	ITA; 9	CAT; 9	NED; 9	GER; 5	CZE; 9	AUT; 10	GBR; C	RSM; 9	ARA; Ret	THA; 8	JPN; 5	AUS; 4	MAL; 7	VAL; Ret		12th	105
2023	MotoGP	Ducati	POR	ARG	AME	SPA	FRA	ITA	GER	NED	GBR	AUT	CAT	RSM	IND	JPN	INA	AUS	THA	MAL; 17	QAT	VAL	31st	0

=== Superbike World Championship ===
==== By season ====
Season	Motorcycle	Team	Race	Win	Podium	Pole	FLap	Pts	Plcd
2019	Ducati Panigale V4 R	Aruba.it Racing – Ducati	36	16	24	4	15	498	**2nd**
2020	Honda CBR1000RR-R	Team HRC	24	0	1	0	1	113	9th
2021	Honda CBR1000RR-R	Team HRC	37	0	2	0	0	195	10th
2022	Ducati Panigale V4 R	Aruba.it Racing – Ducati	36	16	31	2	13	601	**1st**
2023	Ducati Panigale V4 R	Aruba.it Racing – Ducati	36	27	31	4	23	628	**1st**
2024	Ducati Panigale V4 R	Aruba.it Racing – Ducati	35	4	18	0	4	357	**3rd**
2025	Ducati Panigale V4 R	Aruba.it Racing – Ducati	36	0	21	0	1	337	**3rd**
2026	Ducati Panigale V4 R	Barni Spark Racing Team	33	0	1	0	0	167	9th
Total			**273**	**63**	**129**	**10**	**57**	**2896**	

==== Races by year ====
(key) (Races in bold indicate pole position) (Races in italics indicate fastest lap)

Year	Bike	1			2			3			4			5			6			7			8			9			10			11			12			13			Pos	Pts
Year	Bike	R1	SR	R2	R1	SR	R2	R1	SR	R2	R1	SR	R2	R1	SR	R2	R1	SR	R2	R1	SR	R2	R1	SR	R2	R1	SR	R2	R1	SR	R2	R1	SR	R2	R1	SR	R2	R1	SR	R2	Pos	Pts
2019	Ducati	AUS; 1	AUS; 1	AUS; 1	**THA**; 1	**THA**; 1	THA; 1	**SPA**; 1	**SPA**; 1	SPA; 1	**NED**; 1	NED; C	**NED**; 1	ITA; 2	ITA; 3	ITA; C	SPA; 1	SPA; 1	SPA; NC	ITA; 3	ITA; 1	ITA; 14	GBR; Ret	GBR; 4	GBR; 3	USA; 17	USA; DNS	USA; Ret	POR; 4	POR; 2	POR; 1	FRA; 5	FRA; 5	FRA; Ret	**ARG**; 1	**ARG**; 2	ARG; 5	QAT; 4	QAT; 2	QAT; 3	2nd	498
2020	Honda	AUS; 6	AUS; 16	AUS; 6	SPA; 7	SPA; 10	SPA; 8	POR; 9	POR; 11	POR; 5	SPA; Ret	SPA; 4	SPA; 3	SPA; Ret	SPA; 4	SPA; Ret	SPA; 5	SPA; Ret	SPA; Ret	FRA; 12	FRA; 14	FRA; 15	POR; 17	POR; 7	POR; 5																9th	113
2021	Honda	SPA; Ret	SPA; 7	SPA; 11	POR; 8	POR; 10	POR; 7	ITA; 6	ITA; 10	ITA; 8	GBR; 8	GBR; 15	GBR; 10	NED; Ret	NED; 18	NED; 5	CZE; 7	CZE; 9	CZE; 10	SPA; Ret	SPA; 10	SPA; 8	FRA; 6	FRA; 7	FRA; 6	SPA; 9	SPA; 3	SPA; 4	SPA; 5	SPA; C	SPA; 3	POR; Ret	POR; 5	POR; Ret	ARG; Ret	ARG; 11	ARG; 10	INA; 7	INA; C	INA; 10	10th	195
2022	Ducati	SPA; 2	SPA; 1	SPA; 1	NED; 2	NED; 3	NED; 1	POR; 1	POR; 3	POR; 2	**ITA**; 1	**ITA**; 2	ITA; 1	GBR; Ret	GBR; 4	GBR; 2	CZE; 1	CZE; 3	CZE; 2	FRA; 1	FRA; 2	FRA; Ret	SPA; 1	SPA; 1	SPA; 1	POR; 2	POR; 2	POR; 1	ARG; 1	ARG; 2	ARG; 1	INA; 2	INA; 4	INA; 2	**AUS**; 5	**AUS**; 1	AUS; 1				1st	601
2023	Ducati	AUS; 1	AUS; 1	AUS; 1	INA; 1	INA; Ret	INA; 1	**NED**; 1	**NED**; 1	NED; 1	**SPA**; 1	**SPA**; 1	SPA; 1	**ITA**; 1	**ITA**; 1	ITA; 1	GBR; 1	GBR; 2	GBR; 1	ITA; 1	ITA; 2	ITA; Ret	CZE; 12	CZE; 3	CZE; 1	FRA; 10	FRA; 2	FRA; 1	SPA; Ret	SPA; 1	SPA; 1	POR; 1	POR; 1	POR; 1	**SPA**; 1	**SPA**; 1	SPA; 1				1st	628
2024	Ducati	AUS; 15	AUS; 4	AUS; 2	SPA; 3	SPA; 3	SPA; 1	NED; 3	NED; 1	NED; 2	EMI; 3	EMI; 17	EMI; 3	GBR; 3	GBR; 6	GBR; 5	CZE; 4	CZE; NC	CZE; Ret	POR; 2	POR; 6	POR; 19	FRA; 2	FRA; Ret	FRA; DNS	ITA; 3	ITA; 6	ITA; 2	SPA; 4	SPA; 1	SPA; 1	EST; 19	EST; 3	EST; 3	SPA; Ret	SPA; 9	SPA; Ret				3rd	357
2025	Ducati	AUS; 3	AUS; 19	AUS; 2	POR; Ret	POR; 3	POR; 3	NED; Ret	NED; 3	NED; 2	ITA; 3	ITA; 3	ITA; 3	CZE; 5	CZE; 5	CZE; Ret	EMI; 6	EMI; 5	EMI; 3	GBR; Ret	GBR; 4	GBR; 3	HUN; 3	HUN; 3	HUN; Ret	FRA; 16	FRA; Ret	FRA; 4	ARA; Ret	ARA; 3	ARA; 3	EST; 3	EST; 3	EST; 3	SPA; 3	SPA; 2	SPA; 2				3rd	337
2026	Ducati	AUS; Ret	AUS; 7	AUS; 3	POR; 9	POR; 9	POR; Ret	NED; 4	NED; 4	NED; 4	HUN; 5	HUN; 4	HUN; 11	CZE; WD	CZE; WD	CZE; WD	ARA; Ret	ARA; 8	ARA; 7	EMI; 9	EMI; 12	EMI; Ret	GBR; 14	GBR; 11	GBR; 10	FRA; 14	FRA; 15	FRA; 6	ITA; 10	ITA; Ret	ITA; Ret	POR; 9	POR; 5	POR; Ret	SPA; 4	SPA; 6	SPA; 4				9th	167

* Season still in progress.

Sporting positions
Preceded by Héctor Barberá	Spanish 125cc Champion; 2003	Succeeded by Aleix Espargaró
