= 2023 Supersport 300 World Championship =

7th season of the Supersport 300 World Championship

2023 Supersport 300 World Championship
Previous:	2022	Next:	2024
Support series: Superbike World Championship; Supersport World Championship; Yamaha R3 bLU cRU World Cup

The 2023 Supersport 300 World Championship was the seventh season of the Supersport 300 World Championship. Álvaro Díaz was world champion in this class last year.

The championship was won by Jeffrey Buis at the Portuguese round. The Dutchman who created WorldSSP300 history with his second title.

== Race calendar and results ==
The provisional 2023 season calendar was announced on 8 November 2022. It was then updated on 28 February 2023 to announce the fourth round at Imola Circuit on 14–16 July.

2023 calendar
Round			Country	Circuit	Date	Superpole	Fastest lap	Winning rider	Winning team	Winning constructor	Ref
1	R1	Dutch Round	Netherlands	TT Circuit Assen	22 April	(Italy) Matteo Vanucci	(Netherlands) Jeffrey Buis	(Czech Republic) Petr Svoboda	(Germany) Fusport-RT Motorsport by SKM-Kawasaki	(Japan) Kawasaki	
1	R2	Dutch Round	Netherlands	TT Circuit Assen	23 April	(Italy) Matteo Vanucci	(Spain) Yeray Saiz	(Czech Republic) Petr Svoboda	(Germany) Fusport-RT Motorsport by SKM-Kawasaki	(Japan) Kawasaki	
2	R1	Catalunya Round	Spain	Circuit de Barcelona-Catalunya	6 May	(Brazil) Humberto Maier	(France) Samuel di Sora	(Netherlands) Jeffrey Buis	(Belgium) MTM Kawasaki	(Japan) Kawasaki	
2	R2	Catalunya Round	Spain	Circuit de Barcelona-Catalunya	7 May	(Brazil) Humberto Maier	(France) Samuel di Sora	(Italy) Mirko Gennai	(Italy) Team BrCorse	(Japan) Yamaha	
3	R1	Emilia-Romagna Round	Italy	Misano World Circuit Marco Simoncelli	3 June	(Netherlands) Jeffrey Buis	(United Kingdom) Fenton Seabright	(Italy) Bruno Ieraci	(Italy) ProDina Racing WorldSSP300	(Japan) Kawasaki	
3	R2	Emilia-Romagna Round	Italy	Misano World Circuit Marco Simoncelli	4 June	(Netherlands) Jeffrey Buis	(Italy) Devis Bergamini	(Italy) Bruno Ieraci	(Italy) ProDina Racing WorldSSP300	(Japan) Kawasaki	
4	R1	Italian Round	Italy	Imola Circuit	15 July	(Germany) Dirk Geiger	(Italy) Matteo Vanucci	(Italy) Matteo Vanucci	(Italy) AG Motorsport Italia Yamaha	(Japan) Yamaha	
4	R2	Italian Round	Italy	Imola Circuit	16 July	(Germany) Dirk Geiger	(Spain) José Manuel Osuna	(Germany) Dirk Geiger	(Germany) Freudenberg KTM-Paligo Racing	(Austria) KTM	
5	R1	Czech Round	Czech Republic	Autodrom Most	29 July	(Spain) José Luis Pérez Gonzalez	(Indonesia) Aldi Satya Mahendra	(Germany) Lennox Lehmann	(Germany) Freudenberg KTM-Paligo Racing	(Austria) KTM	
5	R2	Czech Round	Czech Republic	Autodrom Most	30 July	(Spain) José Luis Pérez Gonzalez	(Indonesia) Aldi Satya Mahendra	(Indonesia) Aldi Satya Mahendra	(Italy) Team BrCorse	(Japan) Yamaha	
6	R1	French Round	France	Circuit de Nevers Magny-Cours	9 September	(Germany) Dirk Geiger	(United Kingdom) Fenton Seabright	(Netherlands) Jeffrey Buis	(Belgium) MTM Kawasaki	(Japan) Kawasaki	
6	R2	French Round	France	Circuit de Nevers Magny-Cours	10 September	(Germany) Dirk Geiger	(United Kingdom) Fenton Seabright	(Netherlands) Jeffrey Buis	(Belgium) MTM Kawasaki	(Japan) Kawasaki	
7	R1	Aragon Round	Spain	MotorLand Aragón	23 September	(Italy) Matteo Vanucci	(Italy) Matteo Vanucci	(Netherlands) Loris Veneman	(Belgium) MTM Kawasaki	(Japan) Kawasaki	
7	R2	Aragon Round	Spain	MotorLand Aragón	24 September	(Italy) Matteo Vanucci	(United Kingdom) Fenton Seabright	(Netherlands) Jeffrey Buis	(Belgium) MTM Kawasaki	(Japan) Kawasaki	
8	R1	Portuguese Round	Portugal	Algarve International Circuit	30 September	(Spain) José Luis Pérez Gonzalez	(Italy) Mirko Gennai	(Italy) Mirko Gennai	(Italy) Team BrCorse	(Japan) Yamaha	
8	R2	Portuguese Round	Portugal	Algarve International Circuit	1 October	(Spain) José Luis Pérez Gonzalez	(Germany) Dirk Geiger	(Italy) Mirko Gennai	(Italy) Team BrCorse	(Japan) Yamaha	

== Entry list ==
2023 entry list
Team	Constructor	Motorcycle	No.	Rider	Rounds
(Czech Republic) Accolade Smrž Racing BGR	Kawasaki	Ninja 400	16	(Slovakia) Maxim Repák	5
(Czech Republic) Accolade Smrž Racing BGR	Kawasaki	Ninja 400	27	(United States) Christopher Clark	7–8
(Czech Republic) Accolade Smrž Racing BGR	Kawasaki	Ninja 400	35	(Spain) Yeray Saiz Marquez	1–3
(Czech Republic) Accolade Smrž Racing BGR	Kawasaki	Ninja 400	73	(Spain) José Luis Pérez Gonzalez	All
(Czech Republic) Accolade Smrž Racing BGR	Kawasaki	Ninja 400	78	(Belgium) Levi Badie	6
(Spain) Deza-Box 77 Racing Team	Kawasaki	Ninja 400	44	(Spain) Antonio Torres Domínguez	7
(Spain) Deza-Box 77 Racing Team	Kawasaki	Ninja 400	71	(Spain) Iván Bolaño Hernandez	2
(Spain) Deza-Box 77 Racing Team	Kawasaki	Ninja 400	77	(Spain) José Manuel Osuna Saez	All
(Germany) Fusport-RT Motorsports by SKM-Kawasaki	Kawasaki	Ninja 400	53	(Czech Republic) Petr Svoboda	All
(Germany) Fusport-RT Motorsports by SKM-Kawasaki	Kawasaki	Ninja 400	69	(Philippines) Troy Alberto	All
(Italy) Gradaracorse	Kawasaki	Ninja 400	31	(Italy) Jason Roberto Sarchi	4
(Italy) Kawasaki GP Project	Kawasaki	Ninja 400	47	(United Kingdom) Fenton Seabright	All
(Italy) Kawasaki GP Project	Kawasaki	Ninja 400	88	(Spain) Daniel Mogeda	All
(Netherlands) Molenaar Racing Team	Kawasaki	Ninja 400	14	(Netherlands) Sven Doornenbal	1
(Netherlands) Molenaar Racing Team	Kawasaki	Ninja 400	18	(Netherlands) Thom Molenaar	1
(Belgium) MTM Kawasaki	Kawasaki	Ninja 400	6	(Netherlands) Jeffrey Buis	All
(Belgium) MTM Kawasaki	Kawasaki	Ninja 400	7	(Netherlands) Loris Veneman	All
(Italy) ProDina Racing WorldSSP300	Kawasaki	Ninja 400	8	(Italy) Bruno Ieraci	3–4
(Italy) ProDina Racing WorldSSP300	Kawasaki	Ninja 400	23	(France) Samuel Di Sora	All
(Italy) ProDina Racing WorldSSP300	Kawasaki	Ninja 400	25	(Italy) Mattia Martella	1–3, 5–8
(Portugal) Quaresma Racing Team	Kawasaki	Ninja 400	79	(Portugal) Tomás Alonso	8
(Portugal) Rame Moto Racing	Kawasaki	Ninja 400	61	(Portugal) Dinis Borges	8
(Republic of Ireland) Team#109 Kawasaki	Kawasaki	Ninja 400	11	(Mexico) Astrid Madrigal	6–8
(Republic of Ireland) Team#109 Kawasaki	Kawasaki	Ninja 400	19	(Italy) Alessandro Zanca	All
(Republic of Ireland) Team#109 Kawasaki	Kawasaki	Ninja 400	51	(Mexico) Juan Pablo Uriosteguí	1–5
(France) Team Flembbo-PL Performances	Kawasaki	Ninja 400	48	(Spain) Julio García González	All
(France) Team Flembbo-PL Performances	Kawasaki	Ninja 400	85	(Italy) Kevin Sabatucci	All
China Racing Team	Kove	321RR	9	(China) Junhao Zhan	3
China Racing Team	Kove	321RR	22	(Spain) Marc García	4–8
China Racing Team	Kove	321RR	98	(China) Shengjunjie Zhou	1–2
(Germany) Freudenberg KTM-Paligo Racing	KTM	RC 390 R	28	(Germany) Lennox Lehmann	1–7
(Germany) Freudenberg KTM-Paligo Racing	KTM	RC 390 R	29	(Netherlands) Walid Khan	5
(Germany) Freudenberg KTM-Paligo Racing	KTM	RC 390 R	60	(Germany) Dirk Geiger	All
(Germany) Freudenberg KTM-Paligo Racing	KTM	RC 390 R	66	(Germany) Phillip Tonn	8
(Italy) AG Motorsport Italia Yamaha	Yamaha	YZF-R3	41	(Italy) Raffaele Tragni	1–3, 5–8
(Italy) AG Motorsport Italia Yamaha	Yamaha	YZF-R3	91	(Italy) Matteo Vanucci	All
(Spain) Arco Motor University Team	Yamaha	YZF-R3	17	(Netherlands) Ruben Bijman	All
(Spain) Arco Motor University Team	Yamaha	YZF-R3	32	(Thailand) Krittapat Keankum	5
(Spain) Arco Motor University Team	Yamaha	YZF-R3	55	(Spain) Unai Calatayud	2
(Spain) Arco Motor University Team	Yamaha	YZF-R3	55	(Spain) Unai Calatayud	6–8
(Spain) Arco Motor University Team	Yamaha	YZF-R3	80	(Italy) Gabriele Mastroluca	1–4
(Spain) Arco Motor University Team	Yamaha	YZF-R3	96	(Spain) Marc Vich Gil	7
(Italy) ProGP Racing	Yamaha	YZF-R3	81	(Greece) Ioannis Peristeras	All
(Italy) ProGP Racing	Yamaha	YZF-R3	13	(Italy) Devis Bergamini	All
(Italy) Racestar	Yamaha	YZF-R3	4	(Italy) Emanuele Cazzaniga	3
(Spain) Sublime Racing by MS Racing	Yamaha	YZF-R3	15	(Italy) Alfonso Coppola	4
(Spain) Sublime Racing by MS Racing	Yamaha	YZF-R3	24	(Italy) Michel Agazzi	4
(Spain) Sublime Racing by MS Racing	Yamaha	YZF-R3	34	(Uruguay) Eitan Gras Cordon	
(Spain) Sublime Racing by MS Racing	Yamaha	YZF-R3	45	(France) Clement Rouge	1–2
(Spain) Sublime Racing by MS Racing	Yamaha	YZF-R3	46	(Netherlands) Kas Beekmans	1
(Spain) Sublime Racing by MS Racing	Yamaha	YZF-R3	51	(Mexico) Juan Pablo Uriosteguí	6–8
(Spain) Sublime Racing by MS Racing	Yamaha	YZF-R3	62	(Brazil) Kevin Santos Fontainha	5
(Spain) Sublime Racing by MS Racing	Yamaha	YZF-R3	99	(Indonesia) Galang Hendra Pratama	2–3, 5–8
(Italy) Team BrCorse	Yamaha	YZF-R3	26	(Italy) Mirko Gennai	All
(Italy) Team BrCorse	Yamaha	YZF-R3	57	(Indonesia) Aldi Satya Mahendra	5
(Italy) Team BrCorse	Yamaha	YZF-R3	93	(Italy) Marco Gaggi	All
(Brazil) Yamaha MS Racing/AD78 Latin America Team	Yamaha	YZF-R3	12	(Brazil) Humberto Maier	All
(Brazil) Yamaha MS Racing/AD78 Latin America Team	Yamaha	YZF-R3	39	(Brazil) Enzo Valentim Garcia	1–7
(Brazil) Yamaha MS Racing/AD78 Latin America Team	Yamaha	YZF-R3	62	(Brazil) Kevin Santos Fontainha	8

Key
Regular rider
Wildcard rider
Replacement rider

== Championship standings ==
Points

Position	**1st**	**2nd**	**3rd**	**4th**	**5th**	**6th**	**7th**	**8th**	**9th**	**10th**	**11th**	**12th**	**13th**	**14th**	**15th**
Points	25	20	16	13	11	10	9	8	7	6	5	4	3	2	1

=== Riders' championship ===
Pos.	Rider	Bike	ASS (Netherlands)		BAR (Spain)		MIS (Italy)		IMO (Italy)		MOS (Czech Republic)		MAG (France)		ARA (Spain)		POR (Portugal)		Pts.
1	(Netherlands) Jeffrey Buis	Kawasaki	8	Ret	1	3	**11**	**Ret**	3	4	9	7	1	1	2	1	8	11	207
2	(Spain) José Luis Pérez Gonzaléz	Kawasaki	4	4	9	4	4	8	4	6	**5**	**3**	5	3	4	9	**3**	**2**	200
3	(Italy) Mirko Gennai	Yamaha	11	5	3	1	2	7	7	Ret	21	Ret	14	2	19	4	1	1	180
4	(Germany) Dirk Geiger	KTM	3	7	6	6	10	2	**2**	**1**	18	23	**4**	**9**	26	5	5	3	174
5	(Italy) Matteo Vanucci	Yamaha	**24**	**3**	8	2	6	Ret	1	2	24	20	7	Ret	**13**	**2**	4	5	155
6	(Czech Republic) Petr Svoboda	Kawasaki	1	1	4	10	Ret	3	14	8	6	8	13	11	Ret	Ret	19	Ret	121
7	(Brazil) Humberto Maier	Yamaha	6	2	5	**8**	3	Ret	5	3	23	9	Ret	10	17	16	14	10	113
8	(Netherlands) Loris Veneman	Kawasaki	9	Ret	Ret	19	14	4	Ret	15	10	Ret	3	5	1	6	7	7	109
9	(Spain) Daniel Mogeda	Kawasaki	16	14	7	5	22	14	Ret	18	3	16	6	4	3	7	9	4	108
10	(Italy) Marco Gaggi	Yamaha	5	10	17	13	7	6	17	13	2	Ret	25	25	8	3	2	Ret	106
11	(France) Samuel Di Sora	Kawasaki	2	6	2	NC	8	9	9	17	Ret	5	Ret	15	Ret	Ret	10	8	98
12	(Italy) Kevin Sabatucci	Kawasaki	15	9	Ret		5	13	6	7	22	14	2	6	11	11	6	13	96
13	(United Kingdom) Fenton Seabright	Kawasaki	10	11	**Ret**	14	15	5	10	Ret	7	6	8	8	10	10	11	9	90
14	(Italy) Bruno Ieraci	Kawasaki					1	1	18	9									57
15	(Spain) José Manuel Osuna Saez	Kawasaki	Ret	22	13	9	19	17	Ret	12	17	2	24	7	6	12	Ret	DNS	57
16	(Germany) Lennox Lehmann	KTM	Ret	Ret	Ret	15	17	16	12	5	1	22	11	17	Ret	DNS			46
17	(Spain) Julio García González	Kawasaki	13	12	12	12	Ret	20	11	14	11	17	Ret	16	7	13	13	12	46
18	(Netherlands) Ruben Bijman	Yamaha	Ret	13	20	Ret	25	10	26	Ret	26	11	9	12	5	Ret	15	17	37
19	(Indonesia) Galang Hendra Pratama	Yamaha			10	11	12	12			Ret	25	16	13	12	15	26	6	37
20	(Italy) Devis Bergamini	Yamaha	7	Ret	18	22	16	11	20	10	19	21	10	Ret	18	8	DNS	15	35
21	(Brazil) Enzo Valentim Garcia	Yamaha	12	8	11	7	9	15	21	20	Ret	24	Ret	20	DNS	DNS			34
22	(Indonesia) Aldi Satya Mahendra	Yamaha									16	1							25
23	(Spain) Marc García	Kove							8	21	8	Ret	12	14	Ret	DNS	25	Ret	24
24	(Italy) Alessandro Zanca	Kawasaki	14	18	Ret	24	13	Ret	13	11	15	12	21	24	20	17	20	26	18
25	(Brazil) Kevin Santos Fontainha	Yamaha									Ret	4					17	14	15
26	(Greece) Ioannis Peristeras	Yamaha	23	23	16	20	24	23	22	25	4	18	19	21	21	21	23	25	13
27	(Spain) Unai Calatayud	Yamaha			Ret	Ret							22	22	9	14	27	18	9
28	(Netherlands) Walid Khan	KTM									Ret	10							6
29	(Slovakia) Maxim Repák	Kawasaki									13	13							6
30	(Mexico) Juan Pablo Uriosteguí	Kawasaki	18	Ret	Ret	Ret	Ret		15	19	12	Ret	18	Ret	16	18	16	20	5
31	(Portugal) Tomás Alonso	Kawasaki															12	22	4
32	(Spain) Yeray Saiz Márquez	Kawasaki	19	15	14	17	Ret	Ret											3
33	(Italy) Raffaele Tragni	Yamaha	22	26	Ret	18	21	21	24	23	14	15	20	23	22	22	Ret	23	3
34	(Spain) Marc Vich Gil	Yamaha													14	Ret			2
35	(Philippines) Troy Alberto	Kawasaki	17	16	15	16	23	18	16	16	20	Ret	17	16	15	Ret	18	19	2
36	(Italy) Mattia Martella	Kawasaki	Ret	17	Ret	21	20	Ret	25	22	25	19	15	19	23	19	24	21	1
	(Germany) Phillip Tonn	KTM															Ret	16	0
	(Italy) Gabriele Mastroluca	Yamaha	Ret	24	Ret	Ret	18	22	23	24									0
	(Netherlands) Kas Beekmans	Yamaha	21	19															0
	(France) Clement Rouge	Yamaha	25	25	19	23													0
	(Italy) Jason Roberto Sarchi	Kawasaki							19	27									0
	(Italy) Emanuele Cazzaniga	Yamaha					Ret	19											0
	(Netherlands) Sven Doornenbal	Kawasaki	20	21															0
	(Netherlands) Thom Molenaar	Kawasaki	Ret	20															0
	(Spain) Antonio Torres Domínguez	Kawasaki													Ret	20			0
	(Portugal) Dinis Borges	Kawasaki															21	24	0
	(Spain) Iván Bolaño Hernandez	Kawasaki			21	25													0
	(China) Shengjunjie Zhou	Kove	Ret	27	22	26													0
	(Mexico) Astrid Madrigal	Kawasaki											DNQ	DNQ	25	23	DNQ	DNQ	0
	(Belgium) Levi Badie	Kawasaki											23	26					0
	(United States) Christopher Clark	Kawasaki													24	Ret	27	27	0
	(Italy) Alfonso Coppola	Yamaha							Ret	Ret									0
	(Italy) Michel Agazzi	Yamaha							Ret	Ret									0
	(Thailand) Krittapat Keankum	Yamaha									DNS	DNS							0
	(China) Junhao Zhan	Kove					DNQ	DNQ											0
Pos.	Rider	Bike	ASS (Netherlands)		BAR (Spain)		MIS (Italy)		IMO (Italy)		MOS (Czech Republic)		MAG (France)		ARA (Spain)		POR (Portugal)		Pts.

Colour	Result
Gold	Winner
Silver	Second place
Bronze	Third place
Green	Points classification
Blue	Non-points classification
Blue	Non-classified finish (NC)
Purple	Retired, not classified (Ret)
Red	Did not qualify (DNQ)
Red	Did not pre-qualify (DNPQ)
Black	Disqualified (DSQ)
White	Did not start (DNS)
White	Withdrew (WD)
White	Race cancelled (C)
Blank	Did not practice (DNP)
Blank	Did not arrive (DNA)
Blank	Excluded (EX)

**Bold** – Pole position
Italics – Fastest lap

=== Teams' championship ===
Pos.	Team	Bike No.	ASS (Netherlands)		BAR (Spain)		MIS (Italy)		IMO (Italy)		MOS (Czech Republic)		MAG (France)		ARA (Spain)		POR (Portugal)		Pts.
Pos.	Team	Bike No.	R1	R2	R1	R2	R1	R2	R1	R2	R1	R2	R1	R2	R1	R2	R1	R2	Pts.
1	(Belgium) MTM Kawasaki	6	8	Ret	1	3	**11**	**Ret**	3	4	9	7	1	1	2	1	8	11	316
1	(Belgium) MTM Kawasaki	7	9	Ret	Ret	19	14	4	Ret	15	10	Ret	3	5	1	6	7	7	316
2	(Italy) Team BrCorse	26	11	5	3	1	2	7	7	Ret	21	Ret	14	2	19	4	1	1	311
2	(Italy) Team BrCorse	57									16	1							311
2	(Italy) Team BrCorse	93	5	10	17	13	7	6	17	13	2	Ret	25	25	8	3	2	Ret	311
3	(Germany) Freudenberg KTM-Paligo Racing	28	Ret	Ret	Ret	15	17	16	12	5	1	22	11	17	Ret	DNS	5	3	226
3	(Germany) Freudenberg KTM-Paligo Racing	29									Ret	10							226
3	(Germany) Freudenberg KTM-Paligo Racing	60	3	7	6	6	10	2	**2**	**1**	18	23	**4**	**9**	26	5			226
3	(Germany) Freudenberg KTM-Paligo Racing	69															Ret	17	226
4	(Czech Republic) Accolade Smrž Racing BGR	16									13	13							209
4	(Czech Republic) Accolade Smrž Racing BGR	27													24	Ret	22	27	209
4	(Czech Republic) Accolade Smrž Racing BGR	35	19	15	14	17	Ret	Ret											209
4	(Czech Republic) Accolade Smrž Racing BGR	73	4	4	9	4	4	8	4	6	**5**	**3**	5	3	4	8	**3**	**2**	209
4	(Czech Republic) Accolade Smrž Racing BGR	78											23	26					209
5	(Italy) Kawasaki GP Project	47	10	11	**Ret**	14	15	5	10	Ret	7	6	8	8	10	10	11	9	198
5	(Italy) Kawasaki GP Project	88	16	14	7	5	22	14	Ret	18	3	16	6	4	3	7	9	4	198
7	(Italy) AG Motorsport Italia Yamaha	41	22	26	Ret	18	21	21	24	23	14	15	20	23	22	22	Ret	23	158
7	(Italy) AG Motorsport Italia Yamaha	91	**24**	**3**	8	2	6	Ret	1	2	24	20	7	Ret	**13**	**2**	4	5	158
7	(Italy) ProDina Racing WorldSSP300	8					1	1											156
7	(Italy) ProDina Racing WorldSSP300	23	2	6	2	NC	8	9	9	17	Ret	5	Ret	15	Ret	Ret	10	8	156
7	(Italy) ProDina Racing WorldSSP300	25	Ret	17	Ret	21	20	Ret	25	22	25	19	15	19	23	19	24	21	156
8	(Brazil) Yamaha MS Racing/AD78 Latin America Team	12	6	2	5	**8**	3	Ret	5	3	23	9	Ret	10	17	16	14	10	147
8	(Brazil) Yamaha MS Racing/AD78 Latin America Team	39	12	8	11	7	9	15	21	20	Ret	26	Ret	20					147
8	(Brazil) Yamaha MS Racing/AD78 Latin America Team	62															17	14	147
9	(France) Team Flembbo-PL Performances	48	13	12	12	12	Ret	20	11	14	11	17	Ret	18	7	13	13	12	142
9	(France) Team Flembbo-PL Performances	85	15	9	Ret		5	13	6	7	22	14	2	6	11	11	6	13	142
10	(Germany) Fusport-RT Motorsports by SKM-Kawasaki	53	1	1	4	10	Ret	3	14	8	6	8	13	11	Ret	Ret	19	Ret	123
10	(Germany) Fusport-RT Motorsports by SKM-Kawasaki	69	17	16	15	16	23	18	16	16	20	Ret	17	16	15	Ret	18	19	123
11	(Spain) Deza-Box 77 Racing Team	44													Ret	20			57
11	(Spain) Deza-Box 77 Racing Team	71			21	25													57
11	(Spain) Deza-Box 77 Racing Team	77	Ret	22	13	9	19	17	Ret	12	17	2	24	7	6	12	Ret	DNS	57
12	(Spain) Sublime Racing by MS Racing	15							Ret	Ret									52
12	(Spain) Sublime Racing by MS Racing	24							Ret	Ret									52
12	(Spain) Sublime Racing by MS Racing	34																	52
12	(Spain) Sublime Racing by MS Racing	45	25	25	19	23													52
12	(Spain) Sublime Racing by MS Racing	46	21	19															52
12	(Spain) Sublime Racing by MS Racing	51											18	Ret	16	18	16	20	52
12	(Spain) Sublime Racing by MS Racing	62									Ret	4							52
12	(Spain) Sublime Racing by MS Racing	99			10	11	12	12			Ret	25	16	13	12	15	26	6	52
13	(Italy) ProGP Racing	13	7	Ret	18	22	16	11	20	10	19	21	10	Ret	18	9	DNS	15	48
13	(Italy) ProGP Racing	81	23	23	16	20	24	23	22	25	4	18	19	21	21	21	23	25	48
14	(Spain) Arco Motor University Team	17	Ret	13	20	Ret	25	10	26	Ret	26	11	9	12	5	Ret	15	16	46
14	(Spain) Arco Motor University Team	32									DNS	DNS							46
14	(Spain) Arco Motor University Team	55			Ret	Ret							22	22	9	14	27	18	46
14	(Spain) Arco Motor University Team	80	Ret	24	Ret	Ret	18	22	23	24									46
14	(Spain) Arco Motor University Team	96													14	Ret			46
15	(Republic of Ireland) Team#109 Kawasaki	11											DNQ	DNQ	25	23	DNQ	DNQ	23
15	(Republic of Ireland) Team#109 Kawasaki	19	14	18	Ret	24	13	Ret	13	11	15	12	21	24	20	17	20	26	23
15	(Republic of Ireland) Team#109 Kawasaki	51	18	Ret	Ret	Ret	Ret		15	19	12	Ret							23
16	China Racing Team	9					DNQ	DNQ											22
16	China Racing Team	22							8	21	8	Ret	12	14	Ret	DNS	25	Ret	22
16	China Racing Team	98	Ret	27	22	26													22
17	(Portugal) Quaresma Racing Team	79															12	22	4
	(Italy) Racestar	4					Ret	19											0
	(Italy) Gradaracorse	31							19	27									0
	(Netherlands) Molenaar Racing Team	14	20	21															0
	(Netherlands) Molenaar Racing Team	18	Ret	20															0
	(Portugal) Rame Moto Racing	61															21	24	0
Pos.	Team	Bike No.	ASS (Netherlands)		BAR (Spain)		MIS (Italy)		IMO (Italy)		MOS (Czech Republic)		MAG (France)		ARA (Spain)		POR (Portugal)		Pts.

=== Manufacturers' championship ===
Pos.	Manufacturer	ASS (Netherlands)		BAR (Spain)		MIS (Italy)		IMO (Italy)		MOS (Czech Republic)		MAG (France)		ARA (Spain)		POR (Portugal)		Pts.
1	(Japan) Kawasaki	1	1	1	3	1	1	3	4	3	2	1	1	1	1	3	2	342
2	(Japan) Yamaha	5	2	3	1	2	6	1	2	2	1	7	2	5	2	1	1	302
3	(Austria) KTM	3	7	6	6	10	2	2	1	1	10	4	9	26	5	5	3	205
4	(China) Kove	Ret	27	22	26	DNQ	DNQ	8	21	8	Ret	12	14	Ret	DNS	25	Ret	22
Pos.	Manufacturer	ASS (Netherlands)		BAR (Spain)		MIS (Italy)		IMO (Italy)		MOS (Czech Republic)		MAG (France)		ARA (Spain)		POR (Portugal)		Pts.
