= Seedorf Racing =

Seedorf Racing was a motorcycle racing team owned by Dutch footballer Clarence Seedorf. It took part in the 125cc World Championship from 2003 until 2007.

The team was founded in 2002 by Seedorf himself, as a project that he was undertaking to support young sportsmen. The first appearance was in the Spanish 125cc Championship, with the rider Ismael Ortega. In 2003 they participated in the World Championship, in the 125cc category. In the Australian Grand Prix, Álvaro Bautista finished fourth, being the first Spaniard in the final classification. In the Valencian Community Grand Prix, Bautista managed to finish in sixth position. During the first half of the season the English racer Christopher Martin rode the second bike, while Danish racer Robbin Harms rode it during the second half. During the CEV Isamel Ortega was Bautista's partner, finishing fourth with two podiums, with Álvaro claiming the CEV title.

In 2004, Brazilian footballer Roberto Carlos became a co-owner, and the team became Seedorf RC3. The team stayed in the 125cc World Championship with Héctor Barberá and Álvaro Bautista as riders, the first one earning the subchampionship. Barberá won a total of four races (Catalunya, Rio de Janeiro, Portugal and Valencia) and another three podiums (second in Germany and third in Jerez and Italy), while Álvaro Bautista was up at the top four times (second in England, and third in Qatar, Malaysia and Australia), occupying the seventh place of the final general classification.

In 2006, Seedorf Racing team up with the Racing World team of Stefano Bedon; the coalition became known as Seedorf Racing World, which raced under an Italian license. Their riders were Fabrizio Lai and Michele Conti and were on Honda, the team's best achievement was in the French GP with Lai taking third place. 2007 was the second year of pairing, but this time with the Gruppo Piaggio, as the team became the official factory team on board a Derbi, and their riders are Lukas Pesek winning two races in China and Australia while Spaniard Nicolas Terol, who is the only Spanish Derbi representative this year, scoring small points.

2008 was a turning point for the joint team when they agreed to part ways with Piaggio and Derbi mutually due to some disagreements and problems. The team dropped the status as the works Derbi team and switched to KTM. The team was on the provisional list as Seedorf KTM 125, but Seedorf and Stefano Bedon parted ways. Since Seedorf Racing was no longer run by Seedorf himself, the team was disestablished. Bedon continued his Racing World to run as I.S.P.A. KTM Aran.

== Team history ==
2003 - Seedorf Racing (Aprilia)

- (Spain) Álvaro Bautista = Place: 20th, 31pts.
- (Denmark) Robbin Harms = Place: 26th, 8pts.

2004 - Seedorf Racing (Aprilia)

- (Spain) Héctor Barberá = Place: 2nd, 202pts.
- (Spain) Álvaro Bautista = Place: 7th, 129pts.

2005 - Seedorf RC3 - Tiempo Holidays (Honda)

- (Spain) Álvaro Bautista = Place: 15th, 47pts.
- (Spain) Aleix Espargaró = Place: 16th, 36pts.

2006 - Valsir Seedorf Racing (Honda)

- (Italy) Fabrizio Lai = Place: 11th, 83pts.
- (Italy) Michele Conti = Place: Not Classified, 0pts.

2007 - Valsir Seedorf Derbi

- (Czech Republic) Lukáš Pešek = Place: 4th, 182pts.
- (Spain) Nicolás Terol = Place: 22nd, 19pts.
