= Evan Bros Racing =

Motorcycle racing team

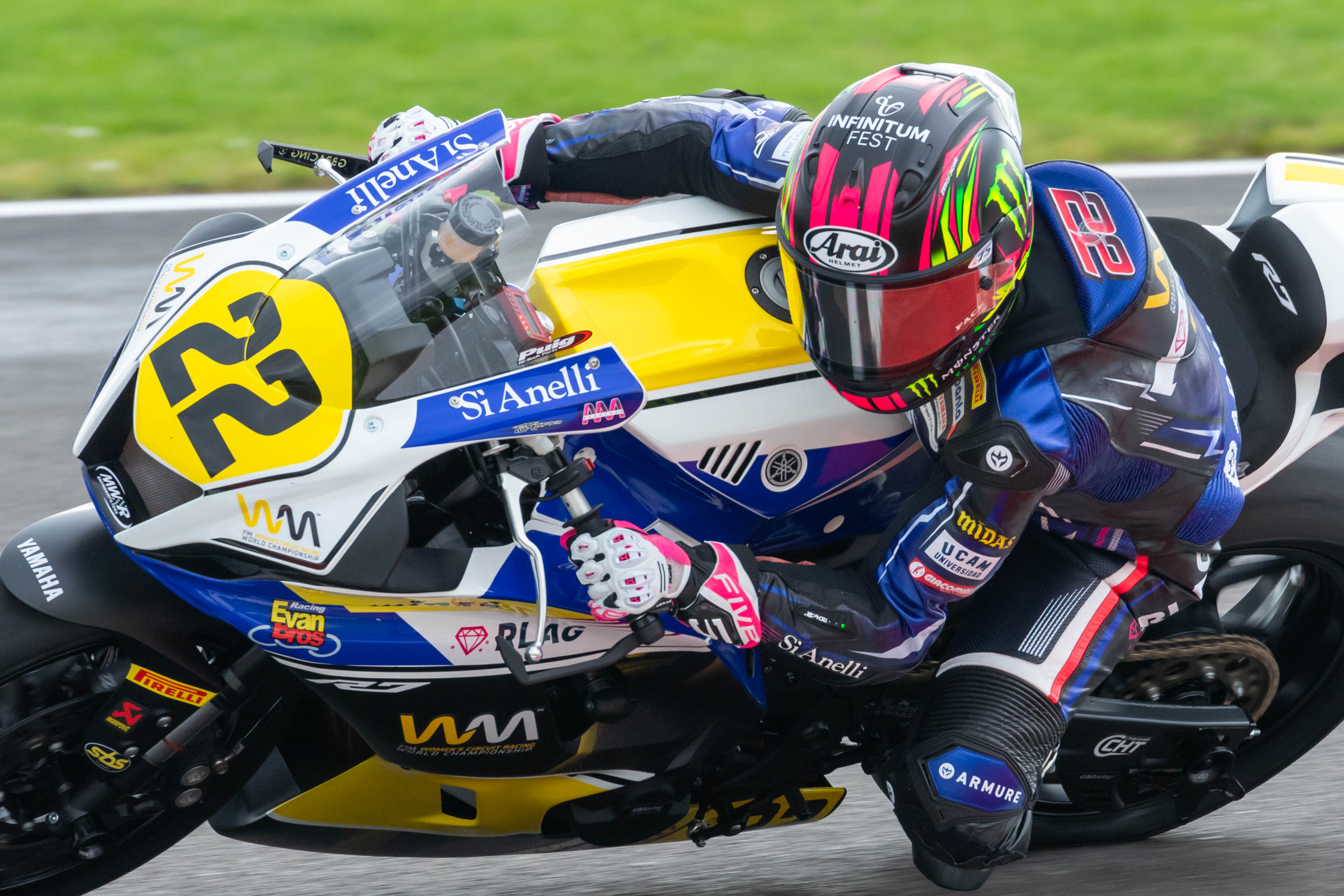
- 2026 name: ZXMOTO Factory Evan Bros Racing
- Base: Ravenna, Italy
- Team principal/s: Fabio Evangelista
- Race riders: Valentin Debise; Federico Caricasulo
- Motorcycle: ZXMOTO 820RR-RS
- Tyres: Pirelli
- Riders' Championships: WorldSSP: 2019: Randy Krummenacher; 2020: Andrea Locatelli; WorldWCR: 2024: Ana Carrasco

Evan Bros Racing is a motorcycle racing team based in Ravenna, Italy. The team competes in the Supersport World Championship and has secured multiple riders' and teams' championships. In 2026, the team operates within the 2026 Supersport World Championship, as ZXMOTO Factory Evan Bros Racing, using two riders: Valentin Debise, Federico Caricasulo.

== History ==
The team's origins trace back to a family-run auto parts business founded by Umberto Evangelista in 1959, later established as a formal racing operation by his sons Fabio and Paolo with Technical Director Mauro Pellegrini. The team emerged in its modern form in the early 2010s, when it began investing in young riders and competing in national and international championships.

After debuting in the Italian CIV Supersport championship in 2013, the team quickly established itself as a competitive outfit, achieving multiple wins and podium finishes. It progressed through categories such as the European Stock 600 Championship, where it secured notable results including a national title with Federico Caricasulo.In 2016, the team entered the Supersport World Championship (WorldSSP), marking a significant step in its development. Following a transitional period, a key milestone came in 2018 with a switch to Yamaha machinery, which laid the foundation for sustained success. The team became a front-running contender, culminating in championship-winning performances, including a dominant 2020 season with Andrea Locatelli, who secured the riders' title with a record number of victories.

Throughout the early 2020s, Evan Bros. maintained its competitive presence, regularly achieving podium finishes and runner-up championship results with riders such as Steven Odendaal and Lorenzo Baldassarri. The team also expanded its activities, notably competing in multiple championships simultaneously and securing additional titles, including success in the women's WorldWCR series.With 2025 season completed, the team ended partnership with Yamaha.

By the mid-2020s, the team had adapted to technical changes, including a transition to new Yamaha machinery, while continuing to develop emerging talent. Consistent race wins, podium finishes, and team championships have established Evan Bros. as one of the leading independent teams in the Supersport category.

In 2026, the team entered into a technical partnership with Chinese manufacturer Zxmoto for the Supersport World Championship, competing under the banner ZXMOTO Factory Evan Bros Racing.

== Race results ==
=== World Supersport Championship ===
(key) (Races in bold indicate pole position, races in italics indicate fastest lap)

Year	Team	Bike	No.	Rider	1	2	3	4	5	6	7	8	9	10	11	12	13	RC	Pts.	TC	Pts.	MC	Pts.
2013	Evan Bros Racing by S.M.A. Honda Italia Jr	Honda CBR600RR	64	(Italy) Marco Faccani	PHI	ARA	ASS	MNZ	DON	POR	IMO; DNS	MOS	SIL	NÜR	IST	MAG	JER; 15	30th	1	—N/a	—N/a	3rd	165
2016	BARDAHL Evan Bros. WorldSSP Team	Honda CBR600RR	64	(Italy) Federico Caricasulo	PHI; 2	CHA; 17	ARA; 7	ASS; 11	IMO; 7	SEP; 10	DON; 11	MIS; **DSQ**	LAU; 5	MAG; 6	JER; Ret	LOS; Ret		9th	75	9th	75	2nd	221
2017	BARDAHL Evan Bros. WorldSSP Team	Honda CBR600RR	11	(Italy) Christian Gamarino	PHI; Ret	CHA; Ret	ARA; 7	ASS; 9	IMO; 7	DON; Ret	MIS; Ret	LAU; 12	POR; 6	MAG; 15	JER; 10	LOS; 12		11th	50	11th	50	3rd	175
2018	BARDAHL Evan Bros. WorldSSP Team	Yamaha YZF-R6	21	(Switzerland) Randy Krummenacher	PHI; 2	CHA; 1	ARA; 11	ASS; 2	IMO; 5	DON; 4	BRN; 5	MIS; 5	POR; 5	MAG; 5	VIL; 6	LOS; 5		4th	159	5th	159	1st	300
2019	BARDAHL Evan Bros. WorldSSP Team	Yamaha YZF-R6	21	(Switzerland) Randy Krummenacher	PHI; 1	CHA; 2	ARA; 1	ASS; **2**	IMO; **1**	JER; **2**	MIS; 1	DON; 4	POR; 2	MAG; Ret	VIL; 7	LOS; 5		1st	213	1st	420	1st	290
2019	BARDAHL Evan Bros. WorldSSP Team	Yamaha YZF-R6	64	(Italy) Federico Caricasulo	PHI; **3**	CHA; 3	ARA; 3	ASS; 1	IMO; 2	JER; 1	MIS; 2	DON; **2**	POR; **1**	MAG; Ret	VIL; 5	LOS; **4**		4th	207	1st	420	1st	290
2019	BARDAHL Evan Bros. WorldSSP Team	Yamaha YZF-R6	27	(Italy) Mattia Casadei	PHI	CHA	ARA	ASS	IMO	JER	MIS; 15	DON	POR	MAG	VIL	LOS		—N/a	—N/a	1st	420	1st	290

Year	Team	Bike	No.	Rider	1	2		3		4		5		6		7		8		RC	Pts.	TC	Pts.	MC	Pts.
Year	Team	Bike	No.	Rider	1	R1	R2	R1	R2	R1	R2	R1	R2	R1	R2	R1	R2	R1	R2	RC	Pts.	TC	Pts.	MC	Pts.
2020	BARDAHL Evan Bros. WorldSSP Team	Yamaha YZF-R6	55	(Italy) Andrea Locatelli	PHI; **1**	JER; **1**	JER; **1**	POR; **1**	POR; **1**	ARA; **1**	ARA; **1**	ARA; **1**	ARA; **1**	CAT; **4**	CAT; **1**	MAG; 1	MAG; Ret	EST; **1**	EST; **2**	1st	333	2nd	333	1st	365
2020	Parkalgar Yamaha: Evan Bros	Yamaha YZF-R6	28	(Angola) Victor Barros	PHI	JER	JER	POR	POR	ARA	ARA	ARA	ARA	CAT	CAT	MAG	MAG	EST; Ret	EST; 22	—N/a	—N/a	2nd	333	1st	365

Year	Team	Bike	No.	Rider	1		2		3		4		5		6		7		8		9		10		11		12		RC	Pts.	TC	Pts.	MC	Pts.
Year	Team	Bike	No.	Rider	R1	R2	R1	R2	R1	R2	R1	R2	R1	R2	R1	R2	R1	R2	R1	R2	R1	R2	R1	R2	R1	R2	R1	R2	RC	Pts.	TC	Pts.	MC	Pts.
2021	Evan Bros. WorldSSP Yamaha Team	Yamaha YZF-R6	4	(South Africa) Steven Odendaal	ARA; 1	ARA; 1	EST; 1	EST; Ret	MIS; 3	MIS; 5	ASS; 2	ASS; 13	MOS; 1	MOS; 2	NAV; 2	NAV; 2	MAG; 2	MAG; 6	BAR; 8	BAR; 7	JER; C	JER; 8	POR; 6	POR; 1	VIL; 4	VIL; Ret	MAN; 6	MAN; Ret	2nd	323	3rd	399	1st	570
2021	Evan Bros. WorldSSP Yamaha Team	Yamaha YZF-R6	56	(Hungary) Péter Sebestyén	ARA; 5	ARA; 11	EST; 5	EST; 4	MIS; 5	MIS; 4	ASS; 6	ASS; 6	MOS; **2**	MOS; **3**	NAV; Ret	NAV; DNS	MAG; 4	MAG; 1	BAR; **2**	BAR; **1**	JER; C	JER; 4	POR; 2	POR; 4	VIL; 2	VIL; 10	MAN; 5	MAN; Ret	13th	76	3rd	399	1st	570
2022	Evan Bros. WorldSSP Yamaha Team	Yamaha YZF-R6	7	(Italy) Lorenzo Baldassarri	ARA; **1**	ARA; **2**	ASS; Ret	ASS; 2	EST; 2	EST; 3	MIS; 2	MIS; 2	DON; 2	DON; 2	MOS; **1**	MOS; **1**	MAG; 1	MAG; 5	BAR; 2	BAR; 4	POR; 2	POR; 7	VIL; 9	VIL; 3	MAN; Ret	MAN; 9	PHI; 4	PHI; 3	2nd	388	3rd	428	1st	571
2022	Evan Bros. WorldSSP Yamaha Team	Yamaha YZF-R6	56	(Hungary) Péter Sebestyén	ARA; 14	ARA; Ret	ASS; 22	ASS; DNS	EST; 24	EST; 13	MIS; 12	MIS; 14	DON; Ret	DON; 16	MOS; 14	MOS; 11	MAG; 13	MAG; 20	BAR; Ret	BAR; 20	POR; 14	POR; Ret	VIL; 12	VIL; 12	MAN; 13	MAN; 22	PHI; 13	PHI; 13	19th	40	3rd	428	1st	571
2023	Evan Bros. WorldSSP Yamaha Team	Yamaha YZF-R6	19	(Italy) Andrea Mantovani	PHI; Ret	PHI; Ret	MAN; DSQ	MAN; 17	ASS; 14	ASS; 12	BAR; 20	BAR; 17	MIS; 14	MIS; 15	DON; WD	DON; WD	IMO	IMO	MOS	MOS	MAG	MAG	ARA	ARA	POR	POR	JER	JER	32nd	9	15th	64	2nd	445
2023	Evan Bros. WorldSSP Yamaha Team	Yamaha YZF-R6	21	(Italy) Filippo Fuligni	PHI	PHI	MAN	MAN	ASS	ASS	BAR	BAR	MIS	MIS	DON	DON	IMO; 11	IMO; 11	MOS	MOS	MAG	MAG	ARA	ARA	POR	POR	JER; 24	JER; 16	30th	10	15th	64	2nd	445
2023	Evan Bros. WorldSSP Yamaha Team	Yamaha YZF-R6	31	(Spain) Adrián Fernández	PHI	PHI	MAN	MAN	ASS	ASS	BAR; 18	BAR; 15	MIS	MIS	DON	DON	IMO	IMO	MOS	MOS	MAG	MAG	ARA	ARA	POR	POR	JER	JER	46th	1	15th	64	2nd	445
2023	Evan Bros. WorldSSP Yamaha Team	Yamaha YZF-R6	48	(Italy) Lorenzo Dalla Porta	PHI	PHI	MAN	MAN	ASS	ASS	BAR	BAR	MIS	MIS	DON	DON	IMO	IMO	MOS; 20	MOS; 19	MAG; 10	MAG; 6	ARA; 16	ARA; Ret	POR; 10	POR; 9	JER; 8	JER; 9	17th	44	15th	64	2nd	445
2023	Evan Bros. WorldSSP Yamaha Team	Yamaha YZF-R6	91	(Republic of Ireland) Jack Kennedy	PHI	PHI	MAN	MAN	ASS	ASS	BAR	BAR	MIS	MIS	DON; 18	DON; 17	IMO	IMO	MOS	MOS	MAG	MAG	ARA	ARA	POR	POR	JER	JER	—N/a	—N/a	15th	64	2nd	445
2024	Evan Bros. WorldSSP Yamaha Team	Yamaha YZF-R6	53	(France) Valentin Debise	PHI; Ret	PHI; 5	BAR; 5	BAR; 5	ASS; 3	ASS; 18	MIS; 4	MIS; 3	DON; 5	DON; 8	MOS; 2	MOS; 4	POR; 6	POR; 3	MAG; 10	MAG; Ret	CRE; 21	CRE; 5	ARA; 3	ARA; 4	EST; Ret	EST; 3	JER; Ret	JER; 2	4th	238	5th	238	2nd	474
2025	Yamaha bLU cRU EvanBros Racing	Yamaha YZF-R9	57	(Indonesia) Aldi Satya Mahendra	PHI; Ret	PHI; 13	POR; 20	POR; 15	ASS; 8	ASS; 8	CRE; 9	CRE; 10	MOS; 5	MOS; 7	MIS; 31	MIS; 13	DON; 10	DON; 14	BAL; 11	BAL; 12	MAG	MAG	ARA	ARA	EST	EST	JER	JER	17th	73	1st	507	1st	561
2025	Yamaha bLU cRU EvanBros Racing	Yamaha YZF-R9	61	(Turkey) Can Öncü	PHI; 5	PHI; 16	POR; **1**	POR; **Ret**	ASS; **3**	ASS; 1	CRE; NC	CRE; Ret	MOS; 2	MOS; 1	MIS; 3	MIS; 1	DON; 5	DON; 1	BAL; 2	BAL; 3	MAG; **2**	MAG; **2**	ARA; 2	ARA; 1	EST; **3**	EST; 9	JER; 3	JER; **4**	2nd	372	1st	507	1st	561
2025	Yamaha bLU cRU EvanBros Racing	Yamaha YZF-R9	76	(Italy) Alberto Surra	PHI	PHI	POR	POR	ASS	ASS	CRE	CRE	MOS	MOS	MIS	MIS	DON	DON	BAL	BAL	MAG; 3	MAG; Ret	ARA; 9	ARA; 9	EST; 6	EST; 5	JER; 5	JER; DNS	19th	62	1st	507	1st	561
2026	Zxmoto Factory Evan Bros Racing	ZXMOTO 820RR-RS	53	(France) Valentin Debise	PHI; 25	PHI; 24	POR; **1**	POR; **1**	ASS; 4	ASS; 7	BAL; **1**	BAL; Ret	MOS; 1	MOS; **1**	ARA; 8	ARA; 8	MIS; 1	MIS; **9**	DON; 9	DON; 10	MAG	MAG	CRE	CRE	EST	EST	JER	JER	2nd*	209*	2nd*	236*	3rd*	211*
2026	Zxmoto Factory Evan Bros Racing	ZXMOTO 820RR-RS	64	(Italy) Federico Caricasulo	PHI; 14	PHI; 19	POR; 9	POR; 17	ASS; Ret	ASS; 16	BAL; 15	BAL; 16	MOS; 12	MOS; 10	ARA; 29	ARA; 19	MIS; 9	MIS; 21	DON; Ret	DON; 18	MAG	MAG	CRE	CRE	EST	EST	JER	JER	18th*	27*	2nd*	236*	3rd*	211*

* Season still in progress.

=== European Superstock 600 Championship ===
(key) (Races in bold indicate pole position, races in italics indicate fastest lap)

Year	Team	Bike	No.	Rider	1	2	3	4	5	6	7	RC	Pts.
2014	Evan Bros. Racing Team	Honda CBR600RR	64	(Italy) Federico Caricasulo	ARA; DSQ	ASS; **Ret**	IMO; 6	MIS; 2	POR; 3	JER; 2	MAG; Ret	5th	66

=== FIM Women's Circuit Racing World Championship ===
(key) (Races in bold indicate pole position, races in italics indicate fastest lap)

Year	Team	Bike	No.	Rider	1		2		3		4		5		6		RC	Pts.
Year	Team	Bike	No.	Rider	R1	R2	R1	R2	R1	R2	R1	R2	R1	R2	R1	R2	RC	Pts.
2024	Evan Bros Racing Yamaha Team	Yamaha YZF-R7	22	(Spain) Ana Carrasco	MIS; 2	MIS; **3**	DON; **1**	DON; 2	ALG; 3	ALG; 1	CRE; 3	CRE; 1	EST; **1**	EST; 2	JER; 2	JER; 3	1st	244
