= 2016 Phillip Island Superbike World Championship round =

First round of the World Championship

(Australia) 2016 Phillip Island Superbike World Championship round
Round details
- Round 1 of 13 rounds in the 2016 Superbike World Championship. and Round 1 of 12 rounds in the 2016 Supersport World Championship.
- Date: 27–28 February, 2016
- Location: Phillip Island
- Course: Permanent racing facility 4.445 km (2.762 mi)

Superbike World Championship
Pole position
(United Kingdom) Tom Sykes
1:30.020
Fastest lap race 1	Fastest lap race 2
(Italy) Davide Giugliano	(United Kingdom) Chaz Davies
1:31.445	1:31.321

Supersport World Championship
Pole position
(Turkey) Kenan Sofuoğlu
1:33.142
Fastest lap
(Italy) Lorenzo Zanetti
1:34.152

The 2016 Phillip Island Superbike World Championship round was the first round of the 2016 Superbike World Championship. It took place over the weekend of 26–28 February 2016 at the Phillip Island Grand Prix Circuit.

== Championship standings after the round ==
Superbike Championship standings after Race 1

Pos.	Rider	Points
1	(United Kingdom) Jonathan Rea	25
2	(United Kingdom) Chaz Davies	20
3	(Netherlands) Michael van der Mark	16
4	(Italy) Davide Giugliano	13
5	(United Kingdom) Tom Sykes	11
6	(France) Sylvain Guintoli	10
7	(United Kingdom) Leon Camier	9
8	(Spain) Jordi Torres	8
9	(United States) Nicky Hayden	7
10	(Australia) Josh Brookes	6
11	(Spain) Román Ramos	5
12	(Italy) Lorenzo Savadori	4
13	(Czech Republic) Karel Abraham	3
14	(Australia) Mike Jones	2
15	(France) Sylvain Barrier	1

Superbike Championship standings after Race 2

Pos.	Rider	Points
1	(United Kingdom) Jonathan Rea	50
2	(Netherlands) Michael van der Mark	36
3	(Italy) Davide Giugliano	29
4	(United Kingdom) Chaz Davies	26
5	(France) Sylvain Guintoli	21
6	(United Kingdom) Tom Sykes	21
7	(United States) Nicky Hayden	20
8	(Spain) Jordi Torres	17
9	(Australia) Josh Brookes	13
10	(United Kingdom) Leon Camier	9
11	(Spain) Román Ramos	9
12	(Germany) Markus Reiterberger	8
13	(Czech Republic) Karel Abraham	8
14	(Italy) Lorenzo Savadori	4
15	(San Marino) Alex de Angelis	3

Supersport Championship standings

Pos.	Rider	Points
1	(Switzerland) Randy Krummenacher	25
2	(Italy) Federico Caricasulo	20
3	(Australia) Anthony West	16
4	(Italy) Christian Gamarino	13
5	(United States) P. J. Jacobsen	11
6	(Italy) Alex Baldolini	10
7	(United Kingdom) Gino Rea	9
8	(Czech Republic) Ondřej Ježek	8
9	(Italy) Roberto Rolfo	7
10	(Australia) Aiden Wagner	6
11	(Spain) Nicolás Terol	5
12	(Australia) Glenn Scott	4
13	(Malaysia) Zulfahmi Khairuddin	3
14	(Australia) Alex Phillis	2
15	(Australia) Mitch Levy	1
