= 2016 Assen Superbike World Championship round =

Racing event

(Netherlands) 2016 Assen Superbike World Championship round
Round details
- Round 4 of 13 rounds in the 2016 Superbike World Championship. and Round 4 of 12 rounds in the 2016 Supersport World Championship.
- Date: 16–17 April, 2016
- Location: TT Circuit Assen
- Course: Permanent racing facility 4.542 km (2.822 mi)

Superbike World Championship
Pole position
(United Kingdom) Tom Sykes
1:35.440
Fastest lap race 1	Fastest lap race 2
(United Kingdom) Chaz Davies	(United Kingdom) Jonathan Rea
1:36.486	1:37.706

Supersport World Championship
Pole position
(Switzerland) Randy Krummenacher
1:39.300
Fastest lap
(United Kingdom) Kyle Smith
1:58.225

The 2016 Assen Superbike World Championship round was the fourth round of the 2016 Superbike World Championship. It took place over the weekend of 15–17 April 2016 at the TT Circuit Assen.

== Championship standings after the round ==
Superbike Championship standings after Race 1

Pos.	Rider	Points
1	(United Kingdom) Jonathan Rea	156
2	(United Kingdom) Chaz Davies	125
3	(United Kingdom) Tom Sykes	102
4	(Netherlands) Michael van der Mark	74
5	(Spain) Jordi Torres	64
6	(United States) Nicky Hayden	57
7	(Italy) Davide Giugliano	56
8	(France) Sylvain Guintoli	53
9	(Germany) Markus Reiterberger	40
10	(Italy) Lorenzo Savadori	38
11	(United Kingdom) Alex Lowes	35
12	(United Kingdom) Leon Camier	32
13	(Spain) Román Ramos	32
14	(Spain) Javier Forés	31
15	(San Marino) Alex de Angelis	29

Superbike Championship standings after Race 2

Pos.	Rider	Points
1	(United Kingdom) Jonathan Rea	181
2	(United Kingdom) Chaz Davies	136
3	(United Kingdom) Tom Sykes	122
4	(Netherlands) Michael van der Mark	90
5	(United States) Nicky Hayden	67
6	(Spain) Jordi Torres	65
7	(Italy) Davide Giugliano	64
8	(France) Sylvain Guintoli	58
9	(Italy) Lorenzo Savadori	51
10	(United Kingdom) Alex Lowes	44
11	(Germany) Markus Reiterberger	40
12	(United Kingdom) Leon Camier	39
13	(Spain) Javier Forés	37
14	(Spain) Román Ramos	36
15	(San Marino) Alex de Angelis	29

Supersport Championship standings

Pos.	Rider	Points
1	(Switzerland) Randy Krummenacher	71
2	(Turkey) Kenan Sofuoğlu	61
3	(United Kingdom) Kyle Smith	41
4	(France) Jules Cluzel	38
5	(United Kingdom) Gino Rea	36
6	(Italy) Federico Caricasulo	34
7	(Italy) Alex Baldolini	31
8	(United States) P. J. Jacobsen	27
9	(Italy) Christian Gamarino	25
10	(Spain) Nicolás Terol	24
11	(Czech Republic) Ondřej Ježek	23
12	(Malaysia) Zulfahmi Khairuddin	20
13	(Italy) Axel Bassani	18
14	(Australia) Anthony West	16
15	(Ukraine) Ilya Mikhalchik	13
