= 2016 Jerez Superbike World Championship round =

(Spain) 2016 Jerez Superbike World Championship round
Round details
- Round 12 of 13 rounds in the 2016 Superbike World Championship. and Round 11 of 12 rounds in the 2016 Supersport World Championship.
- Date: 15–16 October, 2016
- Location: Circuito de Jerez
- Course: Permanent racing facility 4.423 km (2.748 mi)

Superbike World Championship
Pole position
(United Kingdom) Tom Sykes
1:39.190
Fastest lap race 1	Fastest lap race 2
(United Kingdom) Tom Sykes	(United Kingdom) Chaz Davies
1:41.467	1:41.492

Supersport World Championship
Pole position
(Turkey) Kenan Sofuoğlu
1:42.969
Fastest lap
(Finland) Niki Tuuli
1:44.355

The 2016 Jerez Superbike World Championship round was the twelfth round of the 2016 Superbike World Championship. It took place over the weekend of 14–16 October 2016 at the Circuito de Jerez.

== Championship standings after the race ==
Championship standings after Race 1

Pos.	Rider	Points
1	(United Kingdom) Jonathan Rea	442
2	(United Kingdom) Tom Sykes	398
3	(United Kingdom) Chaz Davies	370
4	(Netherlands) Michael van der Mark	245
5	(United States) Nicky Hayden	215
6	(Italy) Davide Giugliano	194
7	(Spain) Jordi Torres	187
8	(United Kingdom) Leon Camier	165
9	(Italy) Lorenzo Savadori	134
10	(Spain) Javier Forés	133
11	(United Kingdom) Alex Lowes	107
12	(France) Sylvain Guintoli	101
13	(San Marino) Alex de Angelis	93
14	(Australia) Josh Brookes	84
15	(Spain) Román Ramos	80

Championship standings after Race 2

Pos.	Rider	Points
1	(United Kingdom) Jonathan Rea	462
2	(United Kingdom) Tom Sykes	414
3	(United Kingdom) Chaz Davies	395
4	(Netherlands) Michael van der Mark	255
5	(United States) Nicky Hayden	228
6	(Italy) Davide Giugliano	197
7	(Spain) Jordi Torres	195
8	(United Kingdom) Leon Camier	165
9	(Italy) Lorenzo Savadori	140
10	(Spain) Javier Forés	133
11	(United Kingdom) Alex Lowes	116
12	(France) Sylvain Guintoli	112
13	(San Marino) Alex de Angelis	93
14	(Australia) Josh Brookes	88
15	(Spain) Román Ramos	85

Supersport Championship standings

Pos.	Rider	Points
1	(Turkey) Kenan Sofuoğlu	196
2	(Switzerland) Randy Krummenacher	129
3	(France) Jules Cluzel	126
4	(United States) P. J. Jacobsen	122
5	(United Kingdom) Kyle Smith	100
6	(United Kingdom) Gino Rea	81
7	(Italy) Ayrton Badovini	76
8	(Italy) Federico Caricasulo	75
9	(Italy) Alex Baldolini	74
10	(Finland) Niki Tuuli	60
11	(Italy) Axel Bassani	55
12	(Italy) Lorenzo Zanetti	50
13	(Malaysia) Zulfahmi Khairuddin	47
14	(Ukraine) Ilya Mikhalchik	39
15	(Czech Republic) Ondřej Ježek	36
