= 2016 Misano Superbike World Championship round =

(Italy) 2016 Misano Superbike World Championship round
Round details
- Round 8 of 13 rounds in the 2016 Superbike World Championship. and Round 8 of 12 rounds in the 2016 Supersport World Championship.
- Date: 18–19 June, 2016
- Location: Misano
- Course: Permanent racing facility 4.226 km (2.626 mi)

Superbike World Championship
Pole position
(United Kingdom) Tom Sykes
1:34.037
Fastest lap race 1	Fastest lap race 2
(United Kingdom) Tom Sykes	(United Kingdom) Alex Lowes
1:35.507	1:35.165

Supersport World Championship
Pole position
(Italy) Federico Caricasulo
1:38.097
Fastest lap
(Turkey) Kenan Sofuoğlu
1:39.056

The 2016 Misano Superbike World Championship round was the eighth round of the 2016 Superbike World Championship. It took place over the weekend of 17–19 June 2016 at the Misano World Circuit Marco Simoncelli.

== Championship standings after the round ==
Superbike Championship standings after Race 1

Pos.	Rider	Points
1	(United Kingdom) Jonathan Rea	318
2	(United Kingdom) Tom Sykes	257
3	(United Kingdom) Chaz Davies	244
4	(Netherlands) Michael van der Mark	157
5	(Italy) Davide Giugliano	149
6	(United States) Nicky Hayden	136
7	(Spain) Jordi Torres	128
8	(United Kingdom) Leon Camier	105
9	(Italy) Lorenzo Savadori	89
10	(United Kingdom) Alex Lowes	73
11	(Germany) Markus Reiterberger	68
12	(Spain) Javier Forés	62
13	(France) Sylvain Guintoli	58
14	(Australia) Josh Brookes	53
15	(Spain) Román Ramos	49

Superbike Championship standings after Race 2

Pos.	Rider	Points
1	(United Kingdom) Jonathan Rea	343
2	(United Kingdom) Tom Sykes	277
3	(United Kingdom) Chaz Davies	244
4	(Italy) Davide Giugliano	165
5	(Netherlands) Michael van der Mark	163
6	(United States) Nicky Hayden	146
7	(Spain) Jordi Torres	137
8	(United Kingdom) Leon Camier	105
9	(Italy) Lorenzo Savadori	100
10	(United Kingdom) Alex Lowes	81
11	(Spain) Javier Forés	75
12	(Germany) Markus Reiterberger	68
13	(France) Sylvain Guintoli	58
14	(Australia) Josh Brookes	55
15	(Spain) Román Ramos	53

Supersport Championship standings

Pos.	Rider	Points
1	(Turkey) Kenan Sofuoğlu	146
2	(Switzerland) Randy Krummenacher	108
3	(United States) P. J. Jacobsen	96
4	(United Kingdom) Gino Rea	81
5	(France) Jules Cluzel	75
6	(Italy) Alex Baldolini	70
7	(United Kingdom) Kyle Smith	68
8	(Italy) Federico Caricasulo	54
9	(Italy) Ayrton Badovini	49
10	(Malaysia) Zulfahmi Khairuddin	40
11	(Czech Republic) Ondřej Ježek	33
12	(Spain) Nicolás Terol	31
13	(Italy) Christian Gamarino	30
14	(Italy) Axel Bassani	30
15	(Italy) Lorenzo Zanetti	28
