= 2016 Imola Superbike World Championship round =

(Italy) 2016 Imola Superbike World Championship round
Round details
- Round 5 of 13 rounds in the 2016 Superbike World Championship. and Round 5 of 12 rounds in the 2016 Supersport World Championship.
- Date: 30 April – 1 May, 2016
- Location: Imola
- Course: Permanent racing facility 4.936 km (3.067 mi)

Superbike World Championship
Pole position
(United Kingdom) Chaz Davies
1:45.598
Fastest lap race 1	Fastest lap race 2
(United Kingdom) Chaz Davies	(United Kingdom) Chaz Davies
1:46.700	1:47.240

Supersport World Championship
Pole position
(France) Jules Cluzel
1:51.132
Fastest lap
(France) Jules Cluzel
1:51.966

The 2016 Imola Superbike World Championship round was the fifth round of the 2016 Superbike World Championship. It took place over the weekend of 29–30 April and 1 May 2016 at the Autodromo Enzo e Dino Ferrari.

== Championship standings after the round ==
Superbike Championship standings after Race 1

Pos.	Rider	Points
1	(United Kingdom) Jonathan Rea	201
2	(United Kingdom) Chaz Davies	161
3	(United Kingdom) Tom Sykes	138
4	(Netherlands) Michael van der Mark	99
5	(Spain) Jordi Torres	78
6	(Italy) Davide Giugliano	75
7	(United States) Nicky Hayden	74
8	(Italy) Lorenzo Savadori	59
9	(France) Sylvain Guintoli	58
10	(United Kingdom) Leon Camier	49
11	(United Kingdom) Alex Lowes	49
12	(Spain) Javier Forés	43
13	(Germany) Markus Reiterberger	43
14	(Spain) Román Ramos	36
15	(San Marino) Alex de Angelis	30

Superbike Championship standings after Race 2

Pos.	Rider	Points
1	(United Kingdom) Jonathan Rea	221
2	(United Kingdom) Chaz Davies	186
3	(United Kingdom) Tom Sykes	154
4	(Netherlands) Michael van der Mark	106
5	(Italy) Davide Giugliano	88
6	(Spain) Jordi Torres	87
7	(United States) Nicky Hayden	82
8	(Italy) Lorenzo Savadori	64
9	(United Kingdom) Leon Camier	60
10	(United Kingdom) Alex Lowes	59
11	(France) Sylvain Guintoli	58
12	(Spain) Javier Forés	49
13	(Germany) Markus Reiterberger	47
14	(Spain) Román Ramos	36
15	(San Marino) Alex de Angelis	32

Supersport Championship standings

Pos.	Rider	Points
1	(Turkey) Kenan Sofuoğlu	86
2	(Switzerland) Randy Krummenacher	71
3	(France) Jules Cluzel	58
4	(United Kingdom) Kyle Smith	47
5	(Italy) Alex Baldolini	44
6	(Italy) Federico Caricasulo	43
7	(United States) P. J. Jacobsen	43
8	(United Kingdom) Gino Rea	36
9	(Czech Republic) Ondřej Ježek	33
10	(Spain) Nicolás Terol	31
11	(Italy) Christian Gamarino	25
12	(Italy) Alessandro Zaccone	22
13	(Italy) Axel Bassani	21
14	(Malaysia) Zulfahmi Khairuddin	20
15	(Ukraine) Ilya Mikhalchik	17
