= 2016 Aragon Superbike World Championship round =

(Spain) 2016 Aragon Superbike World Championship round
Round details
- Round 3 of 13 rounds in the 2016 Superbike World Championship. and Round 3 of 12 rounds in the 2016 Supersport World Championship.
- Date: 2–3 April, 2016
- Location: Motorland Aragón
- Course: Permanent racing facility 5.077 km (3.155 mi)

Superbike World Championship
Pole position
(United Kingdom) Tom Sykes
1:49.374
Fastest lap race 1	Fastest lap race 2
(United Kingdom) Chaz Davies	(United Kingdom) Chaz Davies
1:50.421	1:51.053

Supersport World Championship
Pole position
(Turkey) Kenan Sofuoğlu
1:54.000
Fastest lap
(Turkey) Kenan Sofuoğlu
1:55.344

The 2016 Aragon Superbike World Championship round was the third round of the 2016 Superbike World Championship. It took place over the weekend of 1–3 April 2016 at the Motorland Aragón.

== Championship standings after the round ==
Superbike Championship standings after Race 1

Pos.	Rider	Points
1	(United Kingdom) Jonathan Rea	115
2	(United Kingdom) Tom Sykes	82
3	(United Kingdom) Chaz Davies	80
4	(Netherlands) Michael van der Mark	65
5	(France) Sylvain Guintoli	47
6	(Italy) Davide Giugliano	46
7	(Spain) Jordi Torres	42
8	(United States) Nicky Hayden	41
9	(Germany) Markus Reiterberger	30
10	(Italy) Lorenzo Savadori	23
11	(Spain) Román Ramos	21
12	(United Kingdom) Alex Lowes	20
13	(United Kingdom) Leon Camier	19
14	(Australia) Josh Brookes	17
15	(San Marino) Alex de Angelis	17

Superbike Championship standings after Race 2

Pos.	Rider	Points
1	(United Kingdom) Jonathan Rea	131
2	(United Kingdom) Chaz Davies	105
3	(United Kingdom) Tom Sykes	102
4	(Netherlands) Michael van der Mark	74
5	(Italy) Davide Giugliano	56
6	(France) Sylvain Guintoli	53
7	(Spain) Jordi Torres	53
8	(United States) Nicky Hayden	41
9	(Germany) Markus Reiterberger	31
10	(Spain) Javier Forés	28
11	(Italy) Lorenzo Savadori	28
12	(United Kingdom) Alex Lowes	27
13	(San Marino) Alex de Angelis	25
14	(Spain) Román Ramos	25
15	(Australia) Josh Brookes	20

Supersport Championship standings

Pos.	Rider	Points
1	(Switzerland) Randy Krummenacher	58
2	(Turkey) Kenan Sofuoğlu	45
3	(France) Jules Cluzel	38
4	(Italy) Federico Caricasulo	29
5	(United States) P. J. Jacobsen	27
6	(Spain) Nicolás Terol	21
7	(Italy) Alex Baldolini	20
8	(Malaysia) Zulfahmi Khairuddin	20
9	(Italy) Christian Gamarino	19
10	(Australia) Anthony West	16
11	(United Kingdom) Kyle Smith	16
12	(United Kingdom) Gino Rea	16
13	(Czech Republic) Ondřej Ježek	16
14	(Italy) Alessandro Zaccone	11
15	(Germany) Kevin Wahr	11
