= 2016 Lausitz Superbike World Championship round =

2016 Bike championship

(Germany) 2016 Lausitzring Superbike World Championship round
Round details
- Round 10 of 13 rounds in the 2016 Superbike World Championship. and Round 9 of 12 rounds in the 2016 Supersport World Championship.
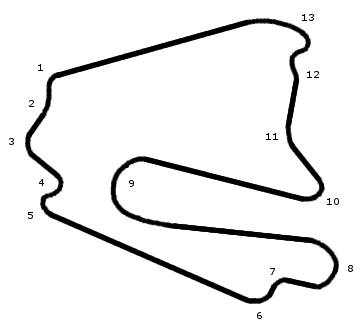
- Date: 17–18 September, 2016
- Location: Lausitzring
- Course: Permanent racing facility 4.265 km (2.650 mi)

Superbike World Championship
Pole position
(United Kingdom) Chaz Davies
1:37.883
Fastest lap race 1	Fastest lap race 2
(United Kingdom) Chaz Davies	(Spain) Javier Forés
1:37.357	1:56.386

Supersport World Championship
Pole position
(Turkey) Kenan Sofuoğlu
1:40:778
Fastest lap
(Finland) Niki Tuuli
1:41.035

The 2016 Lausitz Superbike World Championship round was the tenth round of the 2016 Superbike World Championship. It took place over the weekend of 16–18 September 2016 at the Lausitzring.

== Championship standings after the round ==
Superbike Championship standings after Race 1

Pos.	Rider	Points
1	(United Kingdom) Jonathan Rea	368
2	(United Kingdom) Tom Sykes	342
3	(United Kingdom) Chaz Davies	285
4	(Netherlands) Michael van der Mark	195
5	(Italy) Davide Giugliano	194
6	(United States) Nicky Hayden	189
7	(Spain) Jordi Torres	168
8	(United Kingdom) Leon Camier	121
9	(Italy) Lorenzo Savadori	110
10	(Spain) Javier Forés	103
11	(United Kingdom) Alex Lowes	102
12	(Germany) Markus Reiterberger	68
13	(France) Sylvain Guintoli	65
14	(Spain) Román Ramos	63
15	(San Marino) Alex de Angelis	60

Superbike Championship standings after Race 2

Pos.	Rider	Points
1	(United Kingdom) Jonathan Rea	393
2	(United Kingdom) Tom Sykes	346
3	(United Kingdom) Chaz Davies	295
4	(Netherlands) Michael van der Mark	203
5	(United States) Nicky Hayden	195
6	(Italy) Davide Giugliano	194
7	(Spain) Jordi Torres	168
8	(United Kingdom) Leon Camier	134
9	(Spain) Javier Forés	119
10	(Italy) Lorenzo Savadori	110
11	(United Kingdom) Alex Lowes	102
12	(San Marino) Alex de Angelis	80
13	(France) Sylvain Guintoli	76
14	(Spain) Román Ramos	70
15	(Australia) Josh Brookes	69

Supersport Championship standings

Pos.	Rider	Points
1	(Turkey) Kenan Sofuoğlu	171
2	(Switzerland) Randy Krummenacher	118
3	(United States) P. J. Jacobsen	109
4	(France) Jules Cluzel	91
5	(United Kingdom) Gino Rea	81
6	(United Kingdom) Kyle Smith	75
7	(Italy) Alex Baldolini	74
8	(Italy) Federico Caricasulo	65
9	(Italy) Ayrton Badovini	52
10	(Malaysia) Zulfahmi Khairuddin	40
11	(Italy) Lorenzo Zanetti	37
12	(Czech Republic) Ondřej Ježek	33
13	(United Kingdom) Luke Stapleford	32
14	(Spain) Nicolás Terol	31
15	(Italy) Axel Bassani	31
