= Misano Superbike World Championship round =

Misano Superbike World Championship round may refer to:

- 2006 Misano Superbike World Championship round
- 2007 Misano Superbike World Championship round
- 2008 Misano Superbike World Championship round
- 2009 Misano Superbike World Championship round
- 2010 Misano Superbike World Championship round
- 2011 Misano Superbike World Championship round
- 2012 Misano Superbike World Championship round
- 2016 Misano Superbike World Championship round

== See also ==
- Misano World Circuit
