= Assen Superbike World Championship round =

Assen Superbike World Championship round may refer to:

- 2006 Assen Superbike World Championship round
- 2007 Assen Superbike World Championship round
- 2008 Assen Superbike World Championship round
- 2009 Assen Superbike World Championship round
- 2010 Assen Superbike World Championship round
- 2011 Assen Superbike World Championship round
- 2012 Assen Superbike World Championship round
- 2014 Assen Superbike World Championship round
- 2016 Assen Superbike World Championship round

== See also ==
- TT Circuit Assen
