= Magny-Cours Superbike World Championship round =

Magny-Cours Superbike World Championship round may refer to:

- 2006 Magny-Cours Superbike World Championship round
- 2007 Magny-Cours Superbike World Championship round
- 2008 Magny-Cours Superbike World Championship round
- 2009 Magny-Cours Superbike World Championship round
- 2010 Magny-Cours Superbike World Championship round
- 2011 Magny-Cours Superbike World Championship round
- 2016 Magny-Cours Superbike World Championship round

== See also ==
- Circuit de Nevers Magny-Cours
