= Aragon Superbike World Championship round =

Aragon Superbike World Championship round may refer to:

- 2011 Aragon Superbike World Championship round
- 2014 Aragon Superbike World Championship round
- 2016 Aragon Superbike World Championship round

== See also ==
- MotorLand Aragón
