= Imola Superbike World Championship round =

Imola Superbike World Championship round may refer to:

- 2006 Imola Superbike World Championship round
- 2009 Imola Superbike World Championship round
- 2010 Imola Superbike World Championship round
- 2011 Imola Superbike World Championship round
- 2012 Imola Superbike World Championship round
- 2016 Imola Superbike World Championship round

== See also ==
- Imola Circuit
