= Phillip Island Superbike World Championship round =

Phillip Island Superbike World Championship round may refer to:

- 2005 Phillip Island Superbike World Championship round
- 2006 Phillip Island Superbike World Championship round
- 2007 Phillip Island Superbike World Championship round
- 2008 Phillip Island Superbike World Championship round
- 2009 Phillip Island Superbike World Championship round
- 2010 Phillip Island Superbike World Championship round
- 2011 Phillip Island Superbike World Championship round
- 2012 Phillip Island Superbike World Championship round
- 2016 Phillip Island Superbike World Championship round

== See also ==
- Phillip Island Grand Prix Circuit
