= Losail Superbike World Championship round =

Losail Superbike World Championship round may refer to:

- 2005 Losail Superbike World Championship round
- 2006 Losail Superbike World Championship round
- 2007 Losail Superbike World Championship round
- 2008 Losail Superbike World Championship round
- 2009 Losail Superbike World Championship round
- 2016 Losail Superbike World Championship round

== See also ==
- Losail International Circuit
