= 2016 Magny-Cours Superbike World Championship round =

(France) 2016 Magny-Cours Superbike World Championship round
Round details
- Round 11 of 13 rounds in the 2016 Superbike World Championship. and Round 10 of 12 rounds in the 2016 Supersport World Championship.
- Date: 1–2 October, 2016
- Location: Circuit de Nevers Magny-Cours
- Course: Permanent racing facility 4.411 km (2.741 mi)

Superbike World Championship
Pole position
(United Kingdom) Jonathan Rea
1:52.881
Fastest lap race 1	Fastest lap race 2
(United Kingdom) Tom Sykes	(United Kingdom) Tom Sykes
1:40.491	1:37.864

Supersport World Championship
Pole position
(Turkey) Kenan Sofuoğlu
1:55.461
Fastest lap
(Finland) Niki Tuuli
1:42.095

The 2016 Magny-Cours Superbike World Championship round was the eleventh round of the 2016 Superbike World Championship. It took place over the weekend of 30 September and 1–2 October 2016 at the Circuit de Nevers Magny-Cours.

== Championship standings after the round ==
Superbike Championship standings after Race 1

Pos.	Rider	Points
1	(United Kingdom) Jonathan Rea	406
2	(United Kingdom) Tom Sykes	362
3	(United Kingdom) Chaz Davies	320
4	(Netherlands) Michael van der Mark	223
5	(United States) Nicky Hayden	195
6	(Italy) Davide Giugliano	194
7	(Spain) Jordi Torres	170
8	(United Kingdom) Leon Camier	143
9	(Spain) Javier Forés	127
10	(Italy) Lorenzo Savadori	121
11	(United Kingdom) Alex Lowes	107
12	(San Marino) Alex de Angelis	86
13	(France) Sylvain Guintoli	83
14	(Australia) Josh Brookes	73
15	(Spain) Román Ramos	73

Superbike Championship standings after Race 2

Pos.	Rider	Points
1	(United Kingdom) Jonathan Rea	426
2	(United Kingdom) Tom Sykes	378
3	(United Kingdom) Chaz Davies	345
4	(Netherlands) Michael van der Mark	234
5	(United States) Nicky Hayden	202
6	(Italy) Davide Giugliano	194
7	(Spain) Jordi Torres	179
8	(United Kingdom) Leon Camier	156
9	(Spain) Javier Forés	133
10	(Italy) Lorenzo Savadori	131
11	(United Kingdom) Alex Lowes	107
12	(France) Sylvain Guintoli	91
13	(San Marino) Alex de Angelis	88
14	(Australia) Josh Brookes	78
15	(Spain) Román Ramos	76

Supersport Championship standings

Pos.	Rider	Points
1	(Turkey) Kenan Sofuoğlu	171
2	(Switzerland) Randy Krummenacher	129
3	(France) Jules Cluzel	116
4	(United States) P. J. Jacobsen	109
5	(United Kingdom) Kyle Smith	84
6	(United Kingdom) Gino Rea	81
7	(Italy) Federico Caricasulo	75
8	(Italy) Alex Baldolini	74
9	(Italy) Ayrton Badovini	68
10	(Malaysia) Zulfahmi Khairuddin	46
11	(Italy) Axel Bassani	44
12	(Italy) Lorenzo Zanetti	44
13	(Finland) Niki Tuuli	40
14	(Czech Republic) Ondřej Ježek	36
15	(United Kingdom) Luke Stapleford	33
