= Lausitz Superbike World Championship round =

Lausitz Superbike World Championship round or EuroSpeedway Lausitz Superbike World Championship round or Lausitzring Superbike World Championship round may refer to:

- 2006 Eurospeedway Lausitz Superbike World Championship round
- 2007 Eurospeedway Lausitz Superbike World Championship round
- 2016 Lausitz Superbike World Championship round

== See also ==
- Lausitzring
