= 2016 Losail Superbike World Championship round =

(Qatar) 2016 Losail Superbike World Championship round
Round details
- Round 13 of 13 rounds in the 2016 Superbike World Championship. and Round 12 of 12 rounds in the 2016 Supersport World Championship.
- Date: 29–30 October, 2016
- Location: Losail International Circuit
- Course: Permanent racing facility 5.380 km (3.343 mi)

Superbike World Championship
Pole position
(United Kingdom) Jonathan Rea
1:56.356
Fastest lap race 1	Fastest lap race 2
(United Kingdom) Chaz Davies	(United Kingdom) Jonathan Rea
1:57.371	1:56.974

Supersport World Championship
Pole position
(United Kingdom) Luke Stapleford
2:01.621
Fastest lap
(United Kingdom) Kyle Smith
2:02.443

The 2016 Losail Superbike World Championship round was the thirteenth and last round of the 2016 Superbike World Championship. It took place over the weekend of 28–30 October 2016 at the Losail International Circuit.

== Championship standings after the race ==
Championship standings after Race 1

Pos.	Rider	Points
1	(United Kingdom) Jonathan Rea	482
2	(United Kingdom) Tom Sykes	427
3	(United Kingdom) Chaz Davies	420
4	(Netherlands) Michael van der Mark	262
5	(United States) Nicky Hayden	239
6	(Spain) Jordi Torres	203
7	(Italy) Davide Giugliano	197
8	(United Kingdom) Leon Camier	165
9	(Italy) Lorenzo Savadori	146
10	(Spain) Javier Forés	143
11	(France) Sylvain Guintoli	128
12	(United Kingdom) Alex Lowes	125
13	(San Marino) Alex de Angelis	96
14	(Australia) Josh Brookes	89
15	(Spain) Román Ramos	87

Championship standings after Race 2

Pos.	Rider	Points
1	(United Kingdom) Jonathan Rea	498
2	(United Kingdom) Tom Sykes	447
3	(United Kingdom) Chaz Davies	445
4	(Netherlands) Michael van der Mark	267
5	(United States) Nicky Hayden	248
6	(Spain) Jordi Torres	213
7	(Italy) Davide Giugliano	197
8	(United Kingdom) Leon Camier	168
9	(Spain) Javier Forés	151
10	(Italy) Lorenzo Savadori	150
11	(France) Sylvain Guintoli	141
12	(United Kingdom) Alex Lowes	131
13	(San Marino) Alex de Angelis	96
14	(Australia) Josh Brookes	89
15	(Spain) Román Ramos	89

Supersport Championship standings

Pos.	Rider	Points
1	(Turkey) Kenan Sofuoğlu	216
2	(France) Jules Cluzel	142
3	(Switzerland) Randy Krummenacher	140
4	(United States) P. J. Jacobsen	135
5	(United Kingdom) Kyle Smith	125
6	(Italy) Ayrton Badovini	86
7	(United Kingdom) Gino Rea	81
8	(Italy) Alex Baldolini	80
9	(Italy) Federico Caricasulo	75
10	(Finland) Niki Tuuli	60
11	(Malaysia) Zulfahmi Khairuddin	56
12	(Italy) Axel Bassani	55
13	(Italy) Lorenzo Zanetti	50
14	(Czech Republic) Ondřej Ježek	41
15	(Ukraine) Ilya Mikhalchik	39
