= 2016 Supersport World Championship =

2016 Supersport World Championship
Previous:	2015	Next:	2017
Support series: Superbike World Championship; FIM Superstock 1000 Cup; European Junior Cup

The 2016 Supersport World Championship was the eighteenth season of the Supersport World Championship—the twentieth taking into account the two held under the name of Supersport World Series, a racing competition on production-based motorcycles of 600 to 750 cm^{3} displacement.

Kenan Sofuoğlu claimed the title for the fifth time in the championship's history with one race to spare. A portion of the full-time riders contested the European rounds only, scoring points for the World Championship standings and competing for the FIM Europe Supersport Cup; Axel Bassani was the Cup entry who amassed the most points in the overall championship standings and was awarded the European title.

== Race calendar and results ==
2016 calendar
Round	Country	Circuit	Date	Superpole	Fastest lap	Winning rider	Winning team
1	Australia	Phillip Island Grand Prix Circuit	28 February	(Turkey) Kenan Sofuoğlu	(Italy) Lorenzo Zanetti	(Switzerland) Randy Krummenacher	Kawasaki Puccetti Racing
2	Thailand	Chang International Circuit	13 March	(France) Jules Cluzel	(United Kingdom) Kyle Smith	(France) Jules Cluzel	MV Agusta Reparto Corse
3	Spain	MotorLand Aragón	3 April	(Turkey) Kenan Sofuoğlu	(Turkey) Kenan Sofuoğlu	(Turkey) Kenan Sofuoğlu	Kawasaki Puccetti Racing
4	Netherlands	TT Circuit Assen	17 April	(Switzerland) Randy Krummenacher	(United Kingdom) Kyle Smith	(United Kingdom) Kyle Smith	CIA Landlord Insurance Honda
5	Italy	Autodromo Enzo e Dino Ferrari	1 May	(France) Jules Cluzel	(France) Jules Cluzel	(Turkey) Kenan Sofuoğlu	Kawasaki Puccetti Racing
6	Malaysia	Sepang International Circuit	15 May	(Turkey) Kenan Sofuoğlu	(United States) P. J. Jacobsen	(Italy) Ayrton Badovini	Gemar Balloons – Team Lorini
7	United Kingdom	Donington Park	29 May	(Turkey) Kenan Sofuoğlu	(United Kingdom) Kyle Smith	(Turkey) Kenan Sofuoğlu	Kawasaki Puccetti Racing
8	Italy	Misano World Circuit Marco Simoncelli	19 June	(Italy) Federico Caricasulo	(Turkey) Kenan Sofuoğlu	(Turkey) Kenan Sofuoğlu	Kawasaki Puccetti Racing
9	Germany	Lausitzring	18 September	(Turkey) Kenan Sofuoğlu	(Finland) Niki Tuuli	(Turkey) Kenan Sofuoğlu	Kawasaki Puccetti Racing
10	France	Circuit de Nevers Magny-Cours	2 October	(Turkey) Kenan Sofuoğlu	(Finland) Niki Tuuli	(France) Jules Cluzel	MV Agusta Reparto Corse
11	Spain	Circuito de Jerez	16 October	(Turkey) Kenan Sofuoğlu	(Finland) Niki Tuuli	(Turkey) Kenan Sofuoğlu	Kawasaki Puccetti Racing
12	Qatar	Losail International Circuit	30 October	(United Kingdom) Luke Stapleford	(United Kingdom) Kyle Smith	(United Kingdom) Kyle Smith	CIA Landlord Insurance Honda

== Entry list ==
2016 entry list
Team	Constructor	Motorcycle	No.	Rider	Rounds
Kawasaki Puccetti Racing	Kawasaki	Kawasaki ZX-6R	1	(Turkey) Kenan Sofuoğlu	All
Kawasaki Puccetti Racing	Kawasaki	Kawasaki ZX-6R	17	(Japan) Hiromichi Kunikawa	3
Kawasaki Puccetti Racing	Kawasaki	Kawasaki ZX-6R	21	(Switzerland) Randy Krummenacher	All
Honda World Supersport Team	Honda	Honda CBR600RR	2	(United States) P. J. Jacobsen	All
GRT Racing Team	MV Agusta	MV Agusta F3 675	4	(United Kingdom) Gino Rea	1–10 (Note: Gino Rea was also entered into round 11; after two practice sessions, due to injury, he was replaced by Lorenzo Zanetti, who changed team in the process as he was already competing in the round as a MV Agusta Reparto Corse entry.)
GRT Racing Team	MV Agusta	MV Agusta F3 675	41	(Australia) Aiden Wagner	1–8
GRT Racing Team	MV Agusta	MV Agusta F3 675	65	(Italy) Michael Canducci	9–12
GRT Racing Team	MV Agusta	MV Agusta F3 675	87	(Italy) Lorenzo Zanetti	11–12
Landbridge Racing	Yamaha	Yamaha YZF-R6	5	(Australia) Mitch Levy	1
Orelac Racing VerdNatura	Kawasaki	Kawasaki ZX-6R	10	(Spain) Nacho Calero	All
Orelac Racing VerdNatura	Kawasaki	Kawasaki ZX-6R	63	(Malaysia) Zulfahmi Khairuddin	All
Team GoEleven	Kawasaki	Kawasaki ZX-6R	11	(Italy) Christian Gamarino	All
Team GoEleven	Kawasaki	Kawasaki ZX-6R	69	(Czech Republic) Ondřej Ježek	1–7, 9–12
Team GoEleven	Kawasaki	Kawasaki ZX-6R	99	(Italy) Luigi Morciano	8
Tribeca Racing	Yamaha	Yamaha YZF-R6	13	(Australia) Anthony West	1
West EAB Yamaha	Yamaha	Yamaha YZF-R6	13	(Australia) Anthony West	4
MV Agusta Reparto Corse	MV Agusta	MV Agusta F3 675	16	(France) Jules Cluzel	All
MV Agusta Reparto Corse	MV Agusta	MV Agusta F3 675	52	(Italy) Massimo Roccoli	12
MV Agusta Reparto Corse	MV Agusta	MV Agusta F3 675	87	(Italy) Lorenzo Zanetti	1–10
Gemar Balloons – Team Lorini	Honda	Honda CBR600RR	19	(Germany) Kevin Wahr	1–6, 8–9
Gemar Balloons – Team Lorini	Honda	Honda CBR600RR	68	(Australia) Glenn Scott	1–3, 7
Gemar Balloons – Team Lorini	Honda	Honda CBR600RR	80	(Spain) Xavier Pinsach	10–12
Gemar Balloons – Team Lorini	Honda	Honda CBR600RR	86	(Italy) Ayrton Badovini	4–12
Team Suzuki Stoneline-Mayer	Suzuki	Suzuki GSX-R600	22	(Finland) Eemeli Lahti	9
Yamaha Thailand Racing Team	Yamaha	Yamaha YZF-R6	24	(Thailand) Decha Kraisart	2
Race Department ATK#25	MV Agusta	MV Agusta F3 675	25	(Italy) Alex Baldolini	1–10, 12
Burns Racing	Suzuki	Suzuki GSX-R600	30	(Australia) Kane Burns	1
Phoenix Racing Suzuki	Suzuki	Suzuki GSX-R600	34	(Italy) Kevin Manfredi	8
CIA Landlord Insurance Honda; CIA Landlord Insurance Profile Honda	Honda	Honda CBR600RR	35	(United Kingdom) Stefan Hill	All
CIA Landlord Insurance Honda; CIA Landlord Insurance Profile Honda	Honda	Honda CBR600RR	71	(Sweden) Christoffer Bergman	4–12
CIA Landlord Insurance Honda; CIA Landlord Insurance Profile Honda	Honda	Honda CBR600RR	78	(Japan) Hikari Okubo	All
CIA Landlord Insurance Honda; CIA Landlord Insurance Profile Honda	Honda	Honda CBR600RR	81	(United Kingdom) Luke Stapleford	1–2
CIA Landlord Insurance Honda; CIA Landlord Insurance Profile Honda	Honda	Honda CBR600RR	111	(United Kingdom) Kyle Smith	All
Kallio Racing	Yamaha	Yamaha YZF-R6	38	(Estonia) Hannes Soomer	9–11
Kallio Racing	Yamaha	Yamaha YZF-R6	66	(Finland) Niki Tuuli	9–11
Team CMS	Yamaha	Yamaha YZF-R6	42	(Switzerland) Stéphane Frossard	10
Team Factory Vamag	MV Agusta	MV Agusta F3 675	44	(Italy) Roberto Rolfo	All
AARK Racing	Honda	Honda CBR600RR	48	(Australia) Alex Phillis	1
MVR-Racing	Yamaha	Yamaha YZF-R6	51	(Netherlands) Bryan Schouten	4
Team Rosso e Nero	Yamaha	Yamaha YZF-R6	53	(Italy) Nicola Jr. Morrentino	5
Ellan Vannin Motorsport	MV Agusta	MV Agusta F3 675	57	(Italy) Ilario Dionisi	8
CS Race Team	Triumph	Triumph Daytona 675	58	(France) Clément Stoll	10
A.P.Honda Racing Thailand	Honda	Honda CBR600RR	59	(Thailand) Ratthapong Wilairot	2
Bardahl Evan Bros. Honda Racing	Honda	Honda CBR600RR	64	(Italy) Federico Caricasulo	All
Green Speed	Kawasaki	Kawasaki ZX-6R	65	(Italy) Michael Canducci	5
Start Racing	Yamaha	Yamaha YZF-R6	74	(Netherlands) Jaimie van Sikkelerus	4
Ranieri Med – SC Racing	Yamaha	Yamaha YZF-R6	77	(United Kingdom) Kyle Ryde	1–5
Schmidt Racing	Kawasaki	Kawasaki ZX-6R	77	(United Kingdom) Kyle Ryde	9–12
Schmidt Racing	MV Agusta	MV Agusta F3 675	77	(United Kingdom) Kyle Ryde	7–8
Schmidt Racing	MV Agusta	MV Agusta F3 675	88	(Spain) Nicolás Terol	1–8
Profile Racing	Triumph	Triumph Daytona 675	81	(United Kingdom) Luke Stapleford	4–12
Team Vueffe Corse	Honda	Honda CBR600RR	82	(Italy) Lorenzo Cipiciani	8
Response RE Racing	Kawasaki	Kawasaki ZX-6R	83	(Australia) Lachlan Epis	All
RPM84	Yamaha	Yamaha YZF-R6	84	(Belgium) Loris Cresson	12
Appleyard Macadam Racing, with Integro	Yamaha	Yamaha YZF-R6	89	(United Kingdom) Andrew Irwin	7
Team 23 FELIX LE Pi-LOT by ASPI	Yamaha	Yamaha YZF-R6	123	(France) Felix Peron	10
Broncos Racing Team	Kawasaki	Kawasaki ZX-6R	127	(Italy) Luigi Brignoli	8
DMC Panavto–Yamaha	Yamaha	Yamaha YZF-R6	161	(Russia) Alexey Ivanov	3
TCP Racing	Yamaha	Yamaha YZF-R6	183	(France) Peter Polesso	10
FIM Europe Supersport Cup entries
Scuderia Maranga Racing	Kawasaki	Kawasaki ZX-6R	6	(Italy) Davide Stirpe	3–5, 7–11
R2 MotorRacing Team	Kawasaki	Kawasaki ZX-6R	7	(Belgium) Angelo Licciardi	3–5, 7–10
WILSport Racedays Honda	Honda	Honda CBR600RR	9	(Australia) Jed Metcher	5
WILSport Racedays Honda	Honda	Honda CBR600RR	20	(South Africa) Dorren Loureiro	10–11
WILSport Racedays Honda	Honda	Honda CBR600RR	50	(Canada) Braeden Ortt	3–5, 7–11
WILSport Racedays Honda	Honda	Honda CBR600RR	96	(Spain) Javier Orellana	3–4, 7–8
VFT Racing	Yamaha	Yamaha YZF-R6	12	(Italy) Christopher Gobbi	3–5, 7–11
Team Yohann Moto Sport	Suzuki	Suzuki GSX-R600	23	(France) Cédric Tangre	3–5, 7–11
MTM / HS Kawasaki; MTM Team	Kawasaki	Kawasaki ZX-6R	26	(France) Guillaume Antiga	10
MTM / HS Kawasaki; MTM Team	Kawasaki	Kawasaki ZX-6R	49	(United States) Casey Tobolewski	9
MTM / HS Kawasaki; MTM Team	Kawasaki	Kawasaki ZX-6R	84	(Belgium) Loris Cresson	3–5
MTM / HS Kawasaki; MTM Team	Yamaha	Yamaha YZF-R6	74	(Netherlands) Jaimie van Sikkelerus	7
San Carlo Team Italia	Kawasaki	Kawasaki ZX-6R	47	(Italy) Axel Bassani	3–5, 7–11
San Carlo Team Italia	Kawasaki	Kawasaki ZX-6R	61	(Italy) Alessandro Zaccone	3–5, 7–11
DS Junior Team	Kawasaki	Kawasaki ZX-6R	55	(Ukraine) Illia Mykhalchyk	3–5, 7–11
Schmidt Racing	MV Agusta	MV Agusta F3 675	119	(Hungary) János Chrobák	3–5

Key
Regular rider
Wildcard rider
Replacement rider

- All entries used Pirelli tyres.

== Championship standings ==
=== Riders' championship ===
Pos.	Rider	Bike	PHI (Australia)	CHA (Thailand)	ARA (Spain)	ASS (Netherlands)	IMO (Italy)	SEP (Malaysia)	DON (United Kingdom)	MIS (Italy)	LAU (Germany)	MAG (France)	JER (Spain)	LOS (Qatar)	Pts
1	(Turkey) Kenan Sofuoğlu	Kawasaki	**Ret**	2	**1**	3	1	**6**	**1**	1	**1**	**Ret**	**1**	2	216
2	(France) Jules Cluzel	MV Agusta	17	**1**	4	18	**2**	7	8	Ret	3	1	6	3	142
3	(Switzerland) Randy Krummenacher	Kawasaki	1	4	2	**4**	Ret	8	3	4	6	5	Ret	5	140
4	(United States) P. J. Jacobsen	Honda	5	3	Ret	Ret	3	4	2	2	4	Ret	4	4	135
5	(United Kingdom) Kyle Smith	Honda	Ret	5	11	1	10	5	6	Ret	9	7	3	1	125
6	(Italy) Ayrton Badovini	Honda				7	8	1	9	Ret	13	3	8	6	86
7	(United Kingdom) Gino Rea	MV Agusta	7	9	Ret	2	Ret	3	4	3	Ret	Ret	WD		81
8	(Italy) Alex Baldolini	MV Agusta	6	6	Ret	5	4	9	7	6	12	DNS		10	80
9	(Italy) Federico Caricasulo	Honda	2	17	7	11	7	10	11	**DSQ**	5	6	Ret	Ret	75
10	(Finland) Niki Tuuli	Yamaha									2	2	2		60
11	(Malaysia) Zulfahmi Khairuddin	Kawasaki	13	7	8	20	25	2	20	Ret	22	10	15	7	56
12	(Italy) Axel Bassani	Kawasaki			6	8	13		17	7	15	4	5		55
13	(Italy) Lorenzo Zanetti	MV Agusta	Ret	8	Ret	29	DSQ	13	10	5	7	9	10	Ret	50
14	(Czech Republic) Ondřej Ježek	Kawasaki	8	10	14	9	6	17	Ret		Ret	13	18	11	41
15	(Ukraine) Ilya Mikhalchik	Kawasaki			13	6	12		13	16	14	8	7		39
16	(United Kingdom) Luke Stapleford	Honda	16	14											35
16	(United Kingdom) Luke Stapleford	Triumph				12	18	14	5	8	11	15	14	**Ret**	35
17	(Spain) Nicolás Terol	MV Agusta	11	Ret	3	13	9	Ret	Ret	18					31
18	(Italy) Alessandro Zaccone	Kawasaki			5	19	5		12	Ret	Ret	Ret	11		31
19	(Italy) Christian Gamarino	Kawasaki	4	16	10	10	16	11	Ret	Ret	19	Ret	16	Ret	30
20	(Sweden) Christoffer Bergman	Honda				25	24	18	16	9	8	Ret	9	8	30
21	(Japan) Hikari Okubo	Honda	Ret	20	16	24	19	15	15	11	10	27	13	13	19
22	(Germany) Kevin Wahr	Honda	DNS	12	9	16	11	Ret		15	16				17
23	(Australia) Anthony West	Yamaha	3			DNS									16
24	(Italy) Roberto Rolfo	MV Agusta	9	18	Ret	22	14	12	14	Ret	18	16	Ret	Ret	15
25	(United Kingdom) Kyle Ryde	Yamaha	19	Ret	12	14	15								14
25	(United Kingdom) Kyle Ryde	MV Agusta							21	22					14
25	(United Kingdom) Kyle Ryde	Kawasaki									17	11	DNS	14	14
26	(Australia) Aiden Wagner	MV Agusta	10	15	Ret	DNQ	17	16	19	14					9
27	(Italy) Massimo Roccoli	MV Agusta												9	7
28	(Australia) Glenn Scott	Honda	12	13	DNS				DNS						7
29	(Italy) Davide Stirpe	Kawasaki			19	23	21		27	10	26	26	20		6
30	(Spain) Xavier Pinsach	Honda										14	12	Ret	6
31	(Thailand) Decha Kraisart	Yamaha		11											5
32	(Belgium) Loris Cresson	Kawasaki			18	27	27								4
32	(Belgium) Loris Cresson	Yamaha												12	4
33	(Estonia) Hannes Soomer	Yamaha									21	12	19		4
34	(Italy) Kevin Manfredi	Suzuki								12					4
35	(Italy) Luigi Morciano	Kawasaki								13					3
36	(Australia) Alex Phillis	Honda	14												2
37	(Australia) Lachlan Epis	Kawasaki	21	22	21	DNQ	29	19	28	24	Ret	20	23	15	1
38	(France) Cédric Tangre	Suzuki			Ret	15	26		26	21	25	18	22		1
39	(Spain) Nacho Calero	Kawasaki	18	19	15	26	22	21	24	Ret	24	17	Ret	Ret	1
40	(Australia) Mitch Levy	Yamaha	15												1
	(United Kingdom) Stefan Hill	Honda	20	21	Ret	30	Ret	20	25	Ret	Ret	24	Ret	16	0
	(Italy) Michael Canducci	Kawasaki					Ret								0
	(Italy) Michael Canducci	MV Agusta									23	Ret	17	Ret	0
	(Italy) Ilario Dionisi	MV Agusta								17					0
	(Netherlands) Bryan Schouten	Yamaha				17									0
	(Hungary) János Chrobák	MV Agusta			17	21	Ret								0
	(United Kingdom) Andrew Irwin	Yamaha							18						0
	(France) Guillaume Antiga	Kawasaki										19			0
	(Italy) Christopher Gobbi	Yamaha			20	28	28		29	19	27	25	21		0
	(Finland) Eemeli Lahti	Suzuki									20				0
	(Italy) Luigi Brignoli	Kawasaki								20					0
	(Italy) Nicola Jr. Morrentino	Yamaha					20								0
	(Switzerland) Stéphane Frossard	Yamaha										21			0
	(France) Clément Stoll	Triumph										22			0
	(Spain) Javier Orellana	Honda			Ret	DNS			22	25					0
	(Canada) Braeden Ortt	Honda			22	DNQ	30		Ret	23	28	28	24		0
	(France) Peter Polesso	Yamaha										23			0
	(Netherlands) Jaimie van Sikkelerus	Yamaha				Ret			23						0
	(Australia) Jed Metcher	Honda					23								0
	(South Africa) Dorren Loureiro	Honda										29	25		0
	(France) Felix Peron	Yamaha										30			0
	(Belgium) Angelo Licciardi	Kawasaki			Ret	DNQ	Ret		30	Ret	DNQ	DNQ			0
	(Italy) Lorenzo Cipiciani	Honda								Ret					0
	(Japan) Hiromichi Kunikawa	Kawasaki			Ret										0
	(Russia) Alexey Ivanov	Yamaha			Ret										0
	(Thailand) Ratthapong Wilairot	Honda		Ret											0
	(Australia) Kane Burns	Suzuki	Ret												0
	(United States) Casey Tobolewski	Kawasaki									DNQ				0
Pos.	Rider	Bike	PHI (Australia)	CHA (Thailand)	ARA (Spain)	ASS (Netherlands)	IMO (Italy)	SEP (Malaysia)	DON (United Kingdom)	MIS (Italy)	LAU (Germany)	MAG (France)	JER (Spain)	LOS (Qatar)	Pts

Colour	Result
Gold	Winner
Silver	Second place
Bronze	Third place
Green	Points classification
Blue	Non-points classification
Blue	Non-classified finish (NC)
Purple	Retired, not classified (Ret)
Red	Did not qualify (DNQ)
Red	Did not pre-qualify (DNPQ)
Black	Disqualified (DSQ)
White	Did not start (DNS)
White	Withdrew (WD)
White	Race cancelled (C)
Blank	Did not practice (DNP)
Blank	Did not arrive (DNA)
Blank	Excluded (EX)

**Bold** – Pole position
Italics – Fastest lap

=== Teams' championship ===
Pos.	Teams	Bike No.	PHI (Australia)	CHA (Thailand)	ARA (Spain)	ASS (Netherlands)	IMO (Italy)	SEP (Malaysia)	DON (United Kingdom)	MIS (Italy)	LAU (Germany)	MAG (France)	JER (Spain)	LOS (Qatar)	Pts.
1	(Italy) Kawasaki Puccetti Racing	1	**Ret**	2	**1**	3	1	**6**	**1**	1	**1**	**Ret**	**1**	2	356
1	(Italy) Kawasaki Puccetti Racing	21	1	4	2	**4**	Ret	8	3	4	6	5	Ret	5	356
1	(Italy) Kawasaki Puccetti Racing	17			Ret										356
2	(Italy) MV Agusta Reparto Corse	16	17	**1**	4	18	**2**	7	8	Ret	3	1	6	3	193
2	(Italy) MV Agusta Reparto Corse	87	Ret	8	Ret	29	DSQ	13	10	5	7	9			193
2	(Italy) MV Agusta Reparto Corse	52												9	193
3	(United Kingdom) CIA Landlord Insurance Honda	111	Ret	5	11	1	10	5	6	Ret	9	7	3	1	164
3	(United Kingdom) CIA Landlord Insurance Honda	71				25	24	18	16	9	8	Ret	9	8	164
3	(United Kingdom) CIA Landlord Insurance Honda	78	Ret	20	16	24	19	15	15	11	10	27	13	13	164
3	(United Kingdom) CIA Landlord Insurance Honda	81	16	14											164
3	(United Kingdom) CIA Landlord Insurance Honda	35	20	21	Ret	30	Ret	20	25	Ret	Ret	24	Ret	16	164
4	(Netherlands) Honda World Supersport Team	2	5	3	Ret	Ret	3	4	2	2	4	Ret	4	4	135
5	(Italy) Gemar Balloons – Team Lorini	86				7	8	1	9	Ret	13	3	8	6	116
5	(Italy) Gemar Balloons – Team Lorini	19	DNS	12	9	16	11	Ret		15	16				116
5	(Italy) Gemar Balloons – Team Lorini	68	12	13	DNS				DNS						116
5	(Italy) Gemar Balloons – Team Lorini	80										14	12	Ret	116
6	(Italy) GRT Racing Team	4	7	9	Ret	2	Ret	3	4	3	Ret	Ret	WD		96
6	(Italy) GRT Racing Team	41	10	15	Ret	DNQ	17	16	19	14					96
6	(Italy) GRT Racing Team	87											10	Ret	96
6	(Italy) GRT Racing Team	65									23	Ret	17	Ret	96
7	(Italy) San Carlo Team Italia	47			6	8	13		17	7	15	4	5		86
7	(Italy) San Carlo Team Italia	61			5	19	5		12	Ret	Ret	Ret	11		86
8	(Spain) Race Department ATK#25	25	6	6	Ret	5	4	9	7	6	12	DNS		10	80
9	(Italy) Bardahl Evan Bros. Honda Racing	64	2	17	7	11	7	10	11	**DSQ**	5	6	Ret	Ret	75
10	(Italy) Team GoEleven	69	8	10	14	9	6	17	Ret		Ret	13	18	11	74
10	(Italy) Team GoEleven	11	4	16	10	10	16	11	Ret	Ret	19	Ret	16	Ret	74
10	(Italy) Team GoEleven	99								13					74
11	(Finland) Kallio Racing	66									2	2	2		64
11	(Finland) Kallio Racing	38									21	12	19		64
12	(Spain) Orelac Racing VerdNatura	63	13	7	8	20	25	2	20	Ret	22	10	15	7	57
12	(Spain) Orelac Racing VerdNatura	10	18	19	15	26	22	21	24	Ret	24	17	Ret	Ret	57
13	(Spain) DS Junior Team	55			13	6	12		13	16	14	8	7		39
14	(Germany) Schmidt Racing	88	11	Ret	3	13	9	Ret	Ret	18					38
14	(Germany) Schmidt Racing	77							21	22	17	11	DNS	14	38
14	(Germany) Schmidt Racing	119			17	21	Ret								38
15	(United Kingdom) Profile Racing	42				12	18	14	5	8	11	15	14	**Ret**	33
16	(Australia) Tribeca Racing	13	3												16
17	(Italy) Team Factory Vamag	44	9	18	Ret	22	14	12	14	Ret	18	16	Ret	Ret	15
18	(Italy) Ranieri Med – SC Racing	77	19	Ret	12	14	15								7
19	(Italy) Scuderia Maranga Racing	6			19	23	21		27	10	26	26	20		6
20	Yamaha Thailand Racing Team	24		11											5
21	(Italy) Phoenix Racing Suzuki	34								12					4
22	(Belgium) RPM84	84												12	4
23	(Australia) AARK Racing	48	14												2
24	(Australia) Landbridge Racing	5	15												1
25	(France) Team Yohann Moto Sport	23			Ret	15	26		26	21	25	18	22		1
26	(Australia) Response RE Racing	83	21	22	21	DNQ	29	19	28	24	Ret	20	23	15	1
Pos.	Teams	Bike No.	PHI (Australia)	CHA (Thailand)	ARA (Spain)	ASS (Netherlands)	IMO (Italy)	SEP (Malaysia)	DON (United Kingdom)	MIS (Italy)	LAU (Germany)	MAG (France)	JER (Spain)	LOS (Qatar)	Pts.

=== Manufacturers' championship ===
Pos.	Manufacturer	PHI (Australia)	CHA (Thailand)	ARA (Spain)	ASS (Netherlands)	IMO (Italy)	SEP (Malaysia)	DON (United Kingdom)	MIS (Italy)	LAU (Germany)	MAG (France)	JER (Spain)	LOS (Qatar)	Pts
1	(Japan) Kawasaki	1	2	1	3	1	2	1	1	1	4	1	2	264
2	(Japan) Honda	2	3	7	1	3	1	2	2	4	3	3	1	221
3	(Italy) MV Agusta	6	1	3	2	2	3	4	3	3	1	6	3	203
4	(Japan) Yamaha	3	11	12	14	15		18	19	2	2	2	12	92
5	(United Kingdom) Triumph				12	18	14	5	8	11	15	14	Ret	33
6	(Japan) Suzuki	Ret		Ret	15	26		26	12	20	18	22		5
Pos.	Manufacturer	PHI (Australia)	CHA (Thailand)	ARA (Spain)	ASS (Netherlands)	IMO (Italy)	SEP (Malaysia)	DON (United Kingdom)	MIS (Italy)	LAU (Germany)	MAG (France)	JER (Spain)	LOS (Qatar)	Pts
