= 2017 Supersport World Championship =

2017 Supersport World Championship
Previous:	2016	Next:	2018
Support series: Superbike World Championship; Supersport 300 World Championship; European Superstock 1000 Championship

The 2017 Supersport World Championship season was the twenty-first season of the Supersport World Championship, the nineteenth held under this name. The season was contested over 12 races at 12 locations, starting from 26 February at Phillip Island Grand Prix Circuit in Australia to 4 November at Losail International Circuit in Qatar.

== Race calendar and results ==
2017 calendar
Round	Country	Circuit	Date	Superpole	Fastest lap	Winning rider	Winning team
1	Australia	Phillip Island Grand Prix Circuit	26 February	(United States) P. J. Jacobsen	(United States) P. J. Jacobsen	(Italy) Roberto Rolfo	Team Factory Vamag
2	Thailand	Chang International Circuit	12 March	(France) Jules Cluzel	(Italy) Christian Gamarino	(Italy) Federico Caricasulo	GRT Yamaha Official WorldSSP Team
3	Spain	MotorLand Aragón	2 April	(United States) P. J. Jacobsen	(Italy) Michael Canducci	(France) Lucas Mahias	GRT Yamaha Official WorldSSP Team
4	Netherlands	TT Circuit Assen	30 April	(Turkey) Kenan Sofuoğlu	(Turkey) Kenan Sofuoğlu	(Turkey) Kenan Sofuoğlu	Kawasaki Puccetti Racing
5	Italy	Autodromo Enzo e Dino Ferrari	14 May	(United States) P. J. Jacobsen	(France) Lucas Mahias	(Turkey) Kenan Sofuoğlu	Kawasaki Puccetti Racing
6	United Kingdom	Donington Park	28 May	(Turkey) Kenan Sofuoğlu	(France) Jules Cluzel	(Turkey) Kenan Sofuoğlu	Kawasaki Puccetti Racing
7	Italy	Misano World Circuit Marco Simoncelli	18 June	(Turkey) Kenan Sofuoğlu	(Turkey) Kenan Sofuoğlu	(Turkey) Kenan Sofuoğlu	Kawasaki Puccetti Racing
8	Germany	Lausitzring	20 August	(South Africa) Sheridan Morais	(France) Lucas Mahias	(South Africa) Sheridan Morais	Kallio Racing
9	Portugal	Autódromo Internacional do Algarve	17 September	(Turkey) Kenan Sofuoğlu	(France) Jules Cluzel	(Turkey) Kenan Sofuoğlu	Kawasaki Puccetti Racing
10	France	Circuit de Nevers Magny-Cours	1 October	(Finland) Niki Tuuli	(Italy) Federico Caricasulo	(Finland) Niki Tuuli	Kallio Racing
11	Spain	Circuito de Jerez	22 October	(Italy) Federico Caricasulo	(Italy) Federico Caricasulo	(Italy) Federico Caricasulo	GRT Yamaha Official WorldSSP Team
12	Qatar	Losail International Circuit	4 November	(France) Lucas Mahias	(Turkey) Kenan Sofuoğlu	(France) Lucas Mahias	GRT Yamaha Official WorldSSP Team

== Entry list ==
2017 entry list
Team	Constructor	Motorcycle	No.	Rider	Rounds
Kawasaki Puccetti Racing	Kawasaki	Kawasaki ZX-6R	1	(Turkey) Kenan Sofuoğlu	3–10, 12
Kawasaki Puccetti Racing	Kawasaki	Kawasaki ZX-6R	5	(Italy) Axel Bassani	11
Kawasaki Puccetti Racing	Kawasaki	Kawasaki ZX-6R	13	(Australia) Anthony West	11–12
Kawasaki Puccetti Racing	Kawasaki	Kawasaki ZX-6R	77	(United Kingdom) Kyle Ryde	1–10
Kawasaki Puccetti Racing	Kawasaki	Kawasaki ZX-6R	100	(Thailand) Thitipong Warokorn	2
Kawasaki Puccetti Racing	Kawasaki	Kawasaki ZX-6R	104	(Japan) Ken Eguchi	8
Yohann Moto Sport	Suzuki	Suzuki GSX-R600	2	(France) Cédric Tangre	10
Team Kawasaki Go Eleven	Kawasaki	Kawasaki ZX-6R	4	(United Kingdom) Gino Rea	All
Team Kawasaki Go Eleven	Kawasaki	Kawasaki ZX-6R	26	(Japan) Kazuki Watanabe	All
Puccetti Racing Junior Team FMI; 3570 Puccetti Racing FMI	Kawasaki	Kawasaki ZX-6R	5	(Italy) Axel Bassani	7
Puccetti Racing Junior Team FMI; 3570 Puccetti Racing FMI	Kawasaki	Kawasaki ZX-6R	65	(Italy) Michael Canducci	1–6, 8–12
Race Department ATK#25	MV Agusta	MV Agusta F3 675	7	(Italy) Davide Pizzoli	1–5
Race Department ATK#25	MV Agusta	MV Agusta F3 675	25	(Italy) Alex Baldolini	1–2, 5–9
Race Department ATK#25	MV Agusta	MV Agusta F3 675	69	(Andorra) Xavier Cardelús	3, 6, 8
Race Department ATK#25	Yamaha	Yamaha YZF-R6	25	(Italy) Alex Baldolini	10–12
Race Department ATK#25	Yamaha	Yamaha YZF-R6	69	(Andorra) Xavier Cardelús	11–12
Race Department ATK#25	Yamaha	Yamaha YZF-R6	84	(Belgium) Loris Cresson	7
Orelac Racing VerdNatura	Kawasaki	Kawasaki ZX-6R	10	(Spain) Nacho Calero	All
Orelac Racing VerdNatura	Kawasaki	Kawasaki ZX-6R	63	(Malaysia) Zulfahmi Khairuddin	All
Bardahl Evan Bros. Honda Racing	Honda	Honda CBR600RR	11	(Italy) Christian Gamarino	All
West Racing; EAB West Racing	Yamaha	Yamaha YZF-R6	13	(Australia) Anthony West	1, 3–8
Profile Racing	Triumph	Triumph Daytona 675	14	(Republic of Ireland) Jack Kennedy	5–6
Profile Racing	Triumph	Triumph Daytona 675	35	(United Kingdom) Stefan Hill	1–4, 7–12
Profile Racing	Triumph	Triumph Daytona 675	81	(United Kingdom) Luke Stapleford	All
CIA Landlord Insurance Honda	Honda	Honda CBR600RR	16	(France) Jules Cluzel	All
CIA Landlord Insurance Honda	Honda	Honda CBR600RR	70	(Switzerland) Robin Mulhauser	1–7
CIA Landlord Insurance Honda	Honda	Honda CBR600RR	71	(Sweden) Christoffer Bergman	8–12
CIA Landlord Insurance Honda	Honda	Honda CBR600RR	78	(Japan) Hikari Okubo	All
DS Junior Team	Kawasaki	Kawasaki ZX-6R	17	(Spain) Miquel Pons	11
Euro Twins Brisbane	Triumph	Triumph Daytona 675	22	(Australia) Matt Edwards	1
MVR Racing	Yamaha	Yamaha YZF-R6	23	(Germany) Max Enderlein	9
MVR Racing	Yamaha	Yamaha YZF-R6	88	(United Kingdom) Kev Coghlan	11
MVR Racing	Yamaha	Yamaha YZF-R6	147	(Germany) Marc Buchner	8
Yamaha Thailand Racing Team	Yamaha	Yamaha YZF-R6	24	(Thailand) Decha Kraisart	2
Yamaha Thailand Racing Team	Yamaha	Yamaha YZF-R6	39	(Thailand) Chalermpol Polamai	2
Kallio Racing	Yamaha	Yamaha YZF-R6	32	(South Africa) Sheridan Morais	All
Kallio Racing	Yamaha	Yamaha YZF-R6	66	(Finland) Niki Tuuli	All
MPB Racing	Yamaha	Yamaha YZF-R6	36	(Austria) Thomas Gradinger	8
Halsall Racing Team	Yamaha	Yamaha YZF-R6	40	(United Kingdom) Joe Francis	6
Gemar Team Lorini	Honda	Honda CBR600RR	41	(Australia) Aiden Wagner	1–4
Gemar Team Lorini	Honda	Honda CBR600RR	44	(Italy) Roberto Rolfo	10
Gemar Team Lorini	Honda	Honda CBR600RR	48	(Australia) Giuseppe Scarcella	5–9, 11–12
Gemar Team Lorini	Honda	Honda CBR600RR	111	(United Kingdom) Kyle Smith	All
Stef Racing Team	Yamaha	Yamaha YZF-R6	42	(Switzerland) Stéphane Frossard	10
Team Factory Vamag	MV Agusta	MV Agusta F3 675	44	(Italy) Roberto Rolfo	1–7
Team Factory Vamag	MV Agusta	MV Agusta F3 675	87	(Italy) Lorenzo Zanetti	8–12
Team Factory Vamag	MV Agusta	MV Agusta F3 675	163	(Italy) Davide Stirpe	7
Team Green Speed	Kawasaki	Kawasaki ZX-6R	52	(Italy) Marco Malone	5
Team SWPN	Yamaha	Yamaha YZF-R6	62	(Netherlands) Vasco van der Valk	4
GRT Yamaha Official WorldSSP Team	Yamaha	Yamaha YZF-R6	64	(Italy) Federico Caricasulo	All
GRT Yamaha Official WorldSSP Team	Yamaha	Yamaha YZF-R6	144	(France) Lucas Mahias	All
Team Vueffe Corse	Honda	Honda CBR600RR	82	(Italy) Lorenzo Cipiciani	7
Response RE Racing	Kawasaki	Kawasaki ZX-6R	83	(Australia) Lachlan Epis	All
SC Racing–RPM84	Yamaha	Yamaha YZF-R6	84	(Belgium) Loris Cresson	3, 5
EHA Racing Jewsons Yamaha	Yamaha	Yamaha YZF-R6	95	(United Kingdom) David Allingham	6
DR7 AMR	Kawasaki	Kawasaki ZX-6R	97	(Chile) Martín Scheib	11
MV Agusta Reparto Corse	MV Agusta	MV Agusta F3 675	99	(United States) P. J. Jacobsen	All
QMMF Racing	Kawasaki	Kawasaki ZX-6R	112	(Qatar) Saeed Al Sulaiti	12
QMMF Racing	Kawasaki	Kawasaki ZX-6R	195	(Qatar) Mashel Al Naimi	12
SCS Racing Team	Kawasaki	Kawasaki ZX-6R	122	(Italy) Daniele Corradi	5
Qatar National Team	Kawasaki	Kawasaki ZX-6R	177	(Qatar) Nasser Al Malki	3
FIM Europe Supersport Cup entries
RSV Phoenix Suzuki; Phoenix Suzuki Racing	Suzuki	Suzuki GSX-R600	9	(New Zealand) Connor London	3–5, 7
RSV Phoenix Suzuki; Phoenix Suzuki Racing	Suzuki	Suzuki GSX-R600	73	(Italy) Jacopo Cretaro	3–7
WILSport Racedays	Honda	Honda CBR600RR	38	(Estonia) Hannes Soomer	3–11
Team Hartog – Jenik – Against Cancer	Kawasaki	Kawasaki ZX-6R	47	(Netherlands) Rob Hartog	3–11
SSP Hungary by Pedercini Racing	Kawasaki	Kawasaki ZX-6R	56	(Hungary) Péter Sebestyén	3–11
MV Agusta Reparto Corse	MV Agusta	MV Agusta F3 675	61	(Italy) Alessandro Zaccone	3–11
MVR Racing	Yamaha	Yamaha YZF-R6	74	(Netherlands) Jaimie van Sikkelerus	3–11
CIA Landlord Insurance Honda	Honda	Honda CBR600RR	92	(Japan) Hiromichi Kunikawa	3–7

Key
Regular rider
Wildcard rider
Replacement rider

- All entries used Pirelli tyres.

== Championship standings ==
=== Riders' championship ===
Pos.	Rider	Bike	PHI (Australia)	CHA (Thailand)	ARA (Spain)	ASS (Netherlands)	IMO (Italy)	DON (United Kingdom)	MIS (Italy)	LAU (Germany)	POR (Portugal)	MAG (France)	JER (Spain)	LOS (Qatar)	Pts
1	(France) Lucas Mahias	Yamaha	2	Ret	1	2	2	2	Ret	3	2	4	5	**1**	190
2	(Turkey) Kenan Sofuoğlu	Kawasaki			Ret	**1**	1	**1**	**1**	2	**1**	DNS		3	161
3	(France) Jules Cluzel	Honda	Ret	**Ret**	4	3	6	3	2	4	3	5	2	2	155
4	(South Africa) Sheridan Morais	Yamaha	11	7	2	5	4	6	8	**1**	4	8	6	7	141
5	(Italy) Federico Caricasulo	Yamaha	Ret	1	Ret	6	Ret	Ret	3	Ret	7	2	**1**	4	118
6	(United States) P. J. Jacobsen	MV Agusta	**6**	Ret	**3**	4	**3**	Ret	4	Ret	5	3	4	Ret	108
7	(Finland) Niki Tuuli	Yamaha	5	3	Ret	16	Ret	24	Ret	5	Ret	**1**	7	6	82
8	(Australia) Anthony West	Yamaha	3		DNS	14	11	7	10	8					73
8	(Australia) Anthony West	Kawasaki											3	5	73
9	(United Kingdom) Kyle Smith	Honda	Ret	DSQ	16	11	5	8	5	7	Ret	9	Ret	10	57
10	(United Kingdom) Luke Stapleford	Triumph	Ret	DNS	10	8	13	4	Ret	10	11	10	18	8	55
11	(Italy) Christian Gamarino	Honda	Ret	Ret	7	9	7	Ret	Ret	12	6	15	10	12	50
12	(Italy) Roberto Rolfo	MV Agusta	1	11	6	15	Ret	14	18						43
12	(Italy) Roberto Rolfo	Honda										Ret			43
13	(United Kingdom) Kyle Ryde	Kawasaki	4	5	8	12	Ret	11	14	16	Ret	22			43
14	(Italy) Michael Canducci	Kawasaki	14	Ret	5	7	14	17		15	13	7	11	Ret	42
15	(Japan) Hikari Okubo	Honda	DNS	6	11	21	9	9	15	23	12	11	13	Ret	42
16	(Italy) Lorenzo Zanetti	MV Agusta								6	8	6	17	11	33
17	(United Kingdom) Gino Rea	Kawasaki	Ret	DSQ	Ret	17	15	12	6	Ret	14	Ret	9	9	31
18	(Estonia) Hannes Soomer	Honda			9	13	16	13	9	13	15	13	15		28
19	(Netherlands) Rob Hartog	Kawasaki			12	10	17	19	13	Ret	10	17	8		27
20	(Japan) Kazuki Watanabe	Kawasaki	8	9	15	Ret	Ret	15	12	20	Ret	Ret	22	Ret	21
21	(Thailand) Decha Kraisart	Yamaha		2											20
22	(Australia) Aiden Wagner	Honda	7	8	17	DNS									17
23	(Italy) Alessandro Zaccone	MV Agusta			Ret	18	10	Ret	11	14	Ret	Ret	12		17
24	(Sweden) Christoffer Bergman	Honda								11	9	12	16	16	16
25	(Republic of Ireland) Jack Kennedy	Triumph					12	5							15
26	(Thailand) Thitipong Warokorn	Kawasaki		4											13
27	(Italy) Axel Bassani	Kawasaki							7				14		11
28	(Spain) Nacho Calero	Kawasaki	9	13	18	19	21	22	16	18	Ret	Ret	Ret	17	10
29	(Australia) Lachlan Epis	Kawasaki	10	12	20	Ret	19	23	Ret	21	Ret	24	24	18	10
30	(Belgium) Loris Cresson	Yamaha			Ret		8		Ret						8
31	(Italy) Alex Baldolini	MV Agusta	13	DNS			Ret	16	DNS	Ret	DNS				8
31	(Italy) Alex Baldolini	Yamaha										14	Ret	13	8
32	(Austria) Thomas Gradinger	Yamaha								9					7
33	(United Kingdom) Joe Francis	Yamaha						10							6
34	(Switzerland) Robin Mulhauser	Honda	Ret	10	Ret	20	18	18	Ret						6
35	(Malaysia) Zulfahmi Khairuddin	Kawasaki	12	Ret	14	Ret	Ret	20	Ret	19	17	19	19	19	6
36	(Andorra) Xavier Cardelús	MV Agusta			13			Ret		DNS					5
36	(Andorra) Xavier Cardelús	Yamaha											23	14	5
37	(Italy) Davide Pizzoli	MV Agusta	Ret	14	DNS	Ret	Ret								2
38	(United Kingdom) Stefan Hill	Triumph	Ret	DNS	21	Ret			23	25	Ret	18	Ret	15	1
	(France) Cédric Tangre	Suzuki										16			0
	(Hungary) Péter Sebestyén	Kawasaki			19	24	23	25	17	17	16	21	Ret		0
	(Netherlands) Jaimie van Sikkelerus	Yamaha			24	23	Ret	21	20	22	18	20	21		0
	(Italy) Jacopo Cretaro	Suzuki			22	Ret	22	DNS	19						0
	(Spain) Miquel Pons	Kawasaki											20		0
	(Japan) Hiromichi Kunikawa	Honda			23	Ret	20	26	21						0
	(Italy) Lorenzo Cipiciani	Honda							22						0
	(Netherlands) Vasco van der Valk	Yamaha				22									0
	(Switzerland) Stéphane Frossard	Yamaha										23			0
	(Japan) Ken Eguchi	Kawasaki								24					0
	(New Zealand) Connor London	Suzuki			26	25	25		24						0
	(Australia) Giuseppe Scarcella	Honda					24	27	Ret	26	Ret		25	Ret	0
	(Qatar) Nasser Al Malki	Kawasaki			25										0
	(Qatar) Mashel Al Naimi	Kawasaki												Ret	0
	(Qatar) Saeed Al Sulaiti	Kawasaki												Ret	0
	(Chile) Martín Scheib	Kawasaki											Ret		0
	(Germany) Max Enderlein	Yamaha									Ret				0
	(Germany) Marc Buchner	Yamaha								Ret					0
	(Italy) Davide Stirpe	MV Agusta							Ret						0
	(United Kingdom) David Allingham	Yamaha						Ret							0
	(Italy) Marco Malone	Kawasaki					Ret								0
	(Italy) Daniele Corradi	Kawasaki					Ret								0
	(Thailand) Chalermpol Polamai	Yamaha		Ret											0
	(United Kingdom) Kev Coghlan	Yamaha											DNS		0
	(Australia) Matt Edwards	Triumph	DNQ												0
Pos.	Rider	Bike	PHI (Australia)	CHA (Thailand)	ARA (Spain)	ASS (Netherlands)	IMO (Italy)	DON (United Kingdom)	MIS (Italy)	LAU (Germany)	POR (Portugal)	MAG (France)	JER (Spain)	LOS (Qatar)	Pts

Colour	Result
Gold	Winner
Silver	Second place
Bronze	Third place
Green	Points classification
Blue	Non-points classification
Blue	Non-classified finish (NC)
Purple	Retired, not classified (Ret)
Red	Did not qualify (DNQ)
Red	Did not pre-qualify (DNPQ)
Black	Disqualified (DSQ)
White	Did not start (DNS)
White	Withdrew (WD)
White	Race cancelled (C)
Blank	Did not practice (DNP)
Blank	Did not arrive (DNA)
Blank	Excluded (EX)

**Bold** – Pole position
Italics – Fastest lap

=== Teams' championship ===
Pos.	Teams	Bike No.	PHI (Australia)	CHA (Thailand)	ARA (Spain)	ASS (Netherlands)	IMO (Italy)	DON (United Kingdom)	MIS (Italy)	LAU (Germany)	POR (Portugal)	MAG (France)	JER (Spain)	LOS (Qatar)	Pts.
1	(Italy) GRT Yamaha Official WorldSSP Team	144	2	Ret	1	2	2	2	Ret	3	2	4	5	**1**	308
1	(Italy) GRT Yamaha Official WorldSSP Team	64	Ret	1	Ret	6	Ret	Ret	3	Ret	7	2	**1**	4	308
2	(Italy) Kawasaki Puccetti Racing	1			Ret	**1**	1	**1**	**1**	2	**1**	DNS		3	246
2	(Italy) Kawasaki Puccetti Racing	77	4	5	8	12	Ret	11	14	16	Ret	22			246
2	(Italy) Kawasaki Puccetti Racing	13											3	5	246
2	(Italy) Kawasaki Puccetti Racing	100		4											246
2	(Italy) Kawasaki Puccetti Racing	5											14		246
2	(Italy) Kawasaki Puccetti Racing	104								24					246
3	(Finland) Kallio Racing	32	11	7	2	5	4	6	8	**1**	4	8	6	7	223
3	(Finland) Kallio Racing	66	5	3	Ret	16	Ret	24	Ret	5	Ret	**1**	7	6	223
4	(United Kingdom) CIA Landlord Insurance Honda	16	Ret	**Ret**	4	3	6	3	2	4	3	5	2	2	211
4	(United Kingdom) CIA Landlord Insurance Honda	78	DNS	6	11	21	9	9	15	23	12	11	13	Ret	211
4	(United Kingdom) CIA Landlord Insurance Honda	71								11	9	12	16	16	211
4	(United Kingdom) CIA Landlord Insurance Honda	70	Ret	10	Ret	20	18	18	Ret						211
4	(United Kingdom) CIA Landlord Insurance Honda	92			23	Ret	20	26	21						211
5	(Italy) MV Agusta Reparto Corse	99	**6**	Ret	**3**	4	**3**	Ret	4	Ret	5	3	4	Ret	125
5	(Italy) MV Agusta Reparto Corse	61			Ret	18	10	Ret	11	14	Ret	Ret	12		125
6	(Italy) Team Factory Vamag	44	1	11	6	15	Ret	14	18						76
6	(Italy) Team Factory Vamag	87								6	8	6	17	11	76
6	(Italy) Team Factory Vamag	163							Ret						76
7	(Italy) Gemar Team Lorini	111	Ret	DSQ	16	11	5	8	5	7	Ret	9	Ret	10	74
7	(Italy) Gemar Team Lorini	41	7	8	17	DNS									74
7	(Italy) Gemar Team Lorini	48					24	27	Ret	26	Ret		25	Ret	74
7	(Italy) Gemar Team Lorini	44										Ret			74
8	(United Kingdom) Profile Racing	81	Ret	DNS	10	8	13	4	Ret	10	11	10	18	8	71
8	(United Kingdom) Profile Racing	14					12	5							71
8	(United Kingdom) Profile Racing	35	Ret	DNS	21	Ret			23	25	Ret	18	Ret	15	71
9	(Italy) Team Kawasaki Go Eleven	4	Ret	DSQ	Ret	17	15	12	6	Ret	14	Ret	9	9	52
9	(Italy) Team Kawasaki Go Eleven	26	8	9	15	Ret	Ret	15	12	20	Ret	Ret	22	Ret	52
10	(Italy) 3570 Puccetti Racing FMI	65	14	Ret	5	7	14	17		15	13	7	11	Ret	51
10	(Italy) 3570 Puccetti Racing FMI							7							51
11	(Italy) Bardahl Evan Bros. Honda Racing	11	Ret	Ret	7	9	7	Ret	Ret	12	6	15	10	12	50
12	(Netherlands) EAB West Racing	13	3		DNS	14	11	7	10	8					46
13	(Estonia) WILSport Racedays	38			9	13	16	13	9	13	15	13	15		28
14	(Netherlands) Team Hartog – Jenik – Against Cancer	47			12	10	17	19	13	Ret	10	17	8		27
15	Yamaha Thailand Racing Team	24		2											20
15	Yamaha Thailand Racing Team	39		Ret											20
16	(Spain) Orelac Racing VerdNatura	10	9	13	18	19	21	22	16	18	Ret	Ret	Ret	17	16
16	(Spain) Orelac Racing VerdNatura	63	12	Ret	14	Ret	Ret	20	Ret	19	17	19	19	19	16
17	(Spain) Race Department ATK#25	25	13	DNS			Ret	16	DNS	Ret	DNS	14	Ret	13	15
17	(Spain) Race Department ATK#25	69			13			Ret		DNS			23	14	15
17	(Spain) Race Department ATK#25	7	Ret	14	DNS	Ret	Ret								15
17	(Spain) Race Department ATK#25	84							Ret						15
18	(Australia) Response RE Racing	83	10	12	20	Ret	19	23	Ret	21	Ret	24	24	18	10
19	(Belgium) SC Racing–RPM84	84			Ret		8								8
20	(Austria) MPB Racing	36								9					7
21	(United Kingdom) Halsall Racing Team	40						10							6
	(France) Yohann Moto Sport	2										16			0
	(Italy) SSP Hungary by Pedercini Racing	56			19	24	23	25	17	17	16	21	Ret		0
	(Netherlands) MVR Racing	74			24	23	Ret	21	20	22	18	20	21		0
	(Netherlands) MVR Racing	147								Ret					0
	(Netherlands) MVR Racing	23									Ret				0
	(Netherlands) MVR Racing	88											DNS		0
	(Italy) RSV Phoenix Suzuki Racing	73			22	Ret	22	DNS	19						0
	(Italy) RSV Phoenix Suzuki Racing	9			26	25	25		24						0
	(Spain) DS Junior Team	17											20		0
	(Italy) Team Vueffe Corse	82							22						0
	(Netherlands) Team SWPN	62				22									0
	(Switzerland) Stef Racing Team	42										23			0
	Qatar National Team	177			25										0
	(Italy) SCS Racing Team	122					Ret								0
	(Italy) Team Green Speed	52					Ret								0
	(United Kingdom) EHA Racing Jewsons Yamaha	95						Ret							0
	(Spain) DR7 AMR	97											Ret		0
	(Qatar) QMMF Racing Team	112												Ret	0
	(Qatar) QMMF Racing Team	195												Ret	0
	(Australia) Euro Twins Brisbane	22	DNQ												0
Pos.	Teams	Bike No.	PHI (Australia)	CHA (Thailand)	ARA (Spain)	ASS (Netherlands)	IMO (Italy)	DON (United Kingdom)	MIS (Italy)	LAU (Germany)	POR (Portugal)	MAG (France)	JER (Spain)	LOS (Qatar)	Pts.

=== Manufacturers' championship ===
Pos.	Manufacturer	PHI (Australia)	CHA (Thailand)	ARA (Spain)	ASS (Netherlands)	IMO (Italy)	DON (United Kingdom)	MIS (Italy)	LAU (Germany)	POR (Portugal)	MAG (France)	JER (Spain)	LOS (Qatar)	Pts
1	(Japan) Yamaha	2	1	1	2	2	2	3	1	2	1	1	1	267
2	(Japan) Kawasaki	4	4	5	1	1	1	1	2	1	7	3	3	223
3	(Japan) Honda	7	6	4	3	5	3	2	4	3	5	2	2	175
4	(Italy) MV Agusta	1	11	3	4	3	14	4	6	5	3	4	11	145
5	(United Kingdom) Triumph	Ret	DNS	10	8	12	4	23	10	11	10	18	8	56
	(Japan) Suzuki			22	25	22	DNS	19			16			0
Pos.	Manufacturer	PHI (Australia)	CHA (Thailand)	ARA (Spain)	ASS (Netherlands)	IMO (Italy)	DON (United Kingdom)	MIS (Italy)	LAU (Germany)	POR (Portugal)	MAG (France)	JER (Spain)	LOS (Qatar)	Pts
