= Aiden Wagner =

Australian motorcycle racer

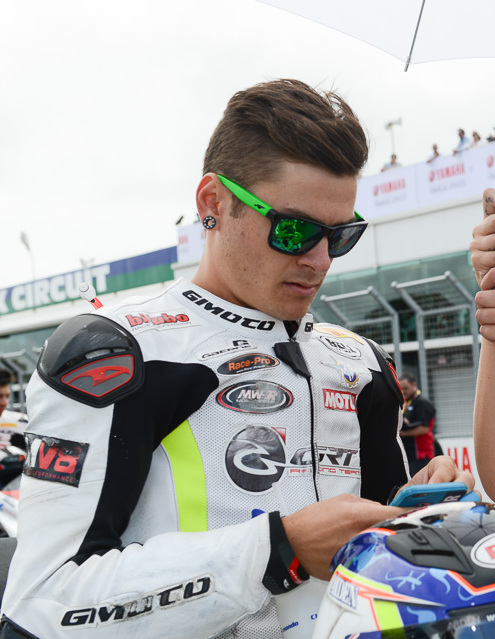
- Wagner in 2016
- Nationality: Australian
- Born: 14 June 1994 (age 32); Wamuran, Australia
- Website: aidenwagner.com.au
Motorcycle racing career statistics
Moto2 World Championship
Active years	2014
Manufacturers	Kalex
2014 championship position	NC (0 pts)
Starts / Wins / Podiums / Poles / F. laps / Points; 1 / 0 / 0 / 0 / 0 / 0
Supersport World Championship
Active years	2015–2017
Manufacturers	Yamaha, Kawasaki, Honda, MV Agusta
2017 championship position	22nd (17 pts)
Starts / Wins / Podiums / Poles / F. laps / Points; 17 / 0 / 0 / 0 / 0 / 39

Aiden Wagner (born 14 June 1994 in Wamuran) is an Australian motorcycle racer from Queensland. He competed internationally for three years, most recently at the 2017 Supersport World Championship aboard a Honda CBR600RR. As of 2020, he was competing for the Yamaha Racing Team.

== Career statistics ==
=== Career highlights ===
- 2015 - 31st, FIM Superstock 1000 Cup, Suzuki GSX-R1000, Kawasaki ZX-10R

=== Grand Prix motorcycle racing ===
==== By season ====
Season	Class	Motorcycle	Team	Race	Win	Podium	Pole	FLap	Pts	Plcd
2014	Moto2	Kalex	Marc VDS Racing Team	1	0	0	0	0	0	NC
Total				**1**	**0**	**0**	**0**	**0**	**0**	

==== Races by year ====
Year	Class	Bike	1	2	3	4	5	6	7	8	9	10	11	12	13	14	15	16	17	18	Pos.	Pts
2014	Moto2	Kalex	QAT	AME	ARG	SPA	FRA	ITA	CAT	NED	GER	INP	CZE	GBR	RSM	ARA	JPN	AUS; 26	MAL	VAL	NC	0

=== Supersport World Championship ===
==== Races by year ====
Year	Bike	1	2	3	4	5	6	7	8	9	10	11	12	Pos.	Pts
2015	Yamaha	AUS; 13	THA	SPA	NED									20th	13
2015	Kawasaki					ITA; 14	GBR; Ret	POR	ITA					20th	13
2015	Honda									MAL; 14	SPA; 13	FRA; 13	QAT; Ret	20th	13
2016	MV Agusta	AUS; 10	THA; 15	SPA; Ret	NED; DNQ	ITA; 17	MAL; 16	GBR; 19	ITA; 14	GER	FRA	SPA	QAT	26th	9
2017	Honda	AUS; 7	THA; 8	SPA; 17	NED; DNS	ITA	GBR	ITA	GER	POR	FRA	SPA	QAT	22nd	17

=== Superstock 1000 Cup ===
==== Races by year ====
(key) (Races in bold indicate pole position) (Races in italics indicate fastest lap)

Year	Bike	1	2	3	4	5	6	7	8	Pos	Pts
2015	Suzuki/Kawasaki	ARA	NED	IMO	DON	ALG; 16	MIS; 14	JER; 19	MAG; 16	31st	2

=== Australian Superbike Championship ===
==== Races by year ====
(key) (Races in bold indicate pole position; races in italics indicate fastest lap)

Year	Bike	1		2		3		4			5		6			7		Pos	Pts
Year	Bike	R1	R2	R1	R2	R1	R2	R1	R2	R3	R1	R2	R1	R2	R3	R1	R2	Pos	Pts
2022	Yamaha	PHI; 7	PHI; 12	QUE; 9	QUE; 9	WAK	WAK	HID	HID	HID	MOR	MOR	PHI	PHI	PHI	BEN	BEN	19th	47
