= Alex Phillis =

Australian motorcycle racer

- Nationality: Australian
- Born: 27 January 1994 (age 32); Albury, Australia
- Current team: Phillis Racing
- Bike number: 20
Motorcycle racing career statistics
125cc World Championship
Active years	2011
Manufacturers	Aprilia
Starts / Wins / Podiums / Poles / F. laps / Points; 0 / 0 / 0 / 0 / 0 / 0
Superbike World Championship
Active years	2015
Manufacturers	Kawasaki
Starts / Wins / Podiums / Poles / F. laps / Points; 8 / 0 / 0 / 0 / 0 / 1
Supersport World Championship
Active years	2015–2016
Manufacturers	Honda
Starts / Wins / Podiums / Poles / F. laps / Points; 2 / 0 / 0 / 0 / 0 / 2

Alexander Phillis (born 27 January 1994) is an Australian motorcycle racer. In 2011, he participated for the first time in a 125cc World Championship event, as a wild-card rider in the Australian round at Phillip Island but failed to qualify for the race. Phillis has also competed Supersport World Championship and Superbike World Championship. He is son of the former motorcycle racer Rob Phillis. He currently competes in the Australian Superbike Championship, aboard a Suzuki GSX-R1000.

== Career statistics ==
=== Grand Prix motorcycle racing ===
==== By season ====
Season	Class	Motorcycle	Team	Race	Win	Podium	Pole	FLap	Pts	Plcd
2011	125cc	Aprilia	Phillis QBE Racing	0	0	0	0	0	0	NC
Total				**0**	**0**	**0**	**0**	**0**	**0**	

==== Races by year ====
(key)

Year	Class	Bike	1	2	3	4	5	6	7	8	9	10	11	12	13	14	15	16	17	Pos.	Pts
2011	125cc	Aprilia	QAT	SPA	POR	FRA	CAT	GBR	NED	ITA	GER	CZE	INP	RSM	ARA	JPN	AUS; DNQ	MAL	VAL	NC	0

=== Supersport World Championship ===
==== Races by year ====
(key)

Year	Bike	1	2	3	4	5	6	7	8	9	10	11	12	Pos.	Pts
2015	Honda	AUS; 17	THA	SPA	NED	ITA	GBR	POR	ITA	MAL	SPA	FRA	QAT	NC	0
2016	Honda	AUS; 14	THA	SPA	NED	ITA	MAL	GBR	ITA	GER	FRA	SPA	QAT	36th	2

=== Superbike World Championship ===
==== Races by year ====
(key) (Races in bold indicate pole position, races in italics indicate fastest lap)

Year	Make	1		2		3		4		5		6		7		8		9		10		11		12		13		Pos.	Pts
Year	Make	R1	R2	R1	R2	R1	R2	R1	R2	R1	R2	R1	R2	R1	R2	R1	R2	R1	R2	R1	R2	R1	R2	R1	R2	R1	R2	Pos.	Pts
2015	Kawasaki	AUS	AUS	THA	THA	SPA	SPA	NED	NED	ITA	ITA	GBR	GBR	POR	POR	ITA	ITA	USA	USA	MAL; 18	MAL; 19	SPA; 19	SPA; 19	FRA; 19	FRA; 22	QAT; 16	QAT; 15	34th	1
