= Glenn Scott =

Australian motorcycle racer

- Nationality: Australian
- Born: 19 September 1991 (age 35); Mangrove Mountain, Australia
Motorcycle racing career statistics
125cc World Championship
Active years	2007
Manufacturers	Aprilia
Championships	0
2007 championship position	NC (0 pts)
Starts / Wins / Podiums / Poles / F. laps / Points; 1 / 0 / 0 / 0 / 0 / 0
Supersport World Championship
Active years	2015–2016
Manufacturers	Honda
Championships	0
2016 championship position	28th (7 pts)
Starts / Wins / Podiums / Poles / F. laps / Points; 13 / 0 / 0 / 0 / 0 / 15

Glenn James Scott (born 19 September 1991) is an Australian motorcycle racer.

== Career ==
In 2007, Scott won the Australian 125 GP Championship; in the same year, he competed in the 125cc Australian Grand Prix as a replacement for the ill Stefano Bianco. After finishing 17th in the 2009 Spanish 125cc Championship he competed in Australian Supersport and Superbike championships. In 2015, he was signed to race in the Supersport World Championship for AARK Racing aboard a Honda CBR600RR. For 2016, he moved to the Lorini team; a leg injury sustained in the third round of the season prevented him from starting any race in the championship for the rest of the year. In 2017, he raced a Kawasaki ZX-10R for Agro On–Benjan–Kawasaki in the European Superstock 1000 Championship.

== Career statistics ==
=== Career highlights ===
- 2017 - 30th, European Superstock 1000 Championship, Kawasaki ZX-10R

=== Grand Prix motorcycle racing ===
==== By season ====
Season	Class	Motorcycle	Team	Race	Win	Podium	Pole	FLap	Pts	Plcd
2007	125cc	Aprilia	WTR No Alcol Team	1	0	0	0	0	0	NC
Total				**1**	**0**	**0**	**0**	**0**	**0**	

==== Races by year ====
(key) (Races in bold indicate pole position; races in italics indicate fastest lap)

Year	Class	Bike	1	2	3	4	5	6	7	8	9	10	11	12	13	14	15	16	17	Pos	Pts
2007	125cc	Aprilia	QAT	SPA	TUR	CHN	FRA	ITA	CAT	GBR	NED	GER	CZE	RSM	POR	JPN	AUS; 26	MAL	VAL	NC	0

=== Supersport World Championship ===
==== Races by year ====
(key) (Races in bold indicate pole position; races in italics indicate fastest lap)

Year	Bike	1	2	3	4	5	6	7	8	9	10	11	12	Pos	Pts
2015	Honda	AUS; 14	THA; 14	SPA; 18	NED; Ret	ITA; Ret	GBR; 16	POR; 13	ITA; 15	MAL; Ret	SPA; 16	FRA; 19	QAT; DNS	25th	8
2016	Honda	AUS; 12	THA; 13	SPA; DNS	NED	ITA	MAL	GBR; DNS	ITA	GER	FRA	SPA	QAT	28th	7

=== European Superstock 1000 Championship ===
==== Races by year ====
(key) (Races in bold indicate pole position) (Races in italics indicate fastest lap)

Year	Bike	1	2	3	4	5	6	7	8	9	Pos	Pts
2017	Kawasaki	ARA; 22	NED; 25	IMO; 14	DON; 16	MIS; 15	LAU; 17	ALG; 16	MAG; Ret	JER; DNS	30th	3
