= Christian Gamarino =

Italian motorcycle racer

- Nationality: Italian
- Born: 18 June 1994 (age 32); Genoa, Italy
- Current team: Corse Tutor
- Bike number: 18
Motorcycle racing career statistics
Supersport World Championship
Active years	2014–2017
Manufacturers	Kawasaki, Honda
Starts / Wins / Podiums / Poles / F. laps / Points; 45 / 0 / 0 / 0 / 1 / 159

Christian Gamarino (born 18 June 1994 in Genoa) is an Italian motorcycle racer. He currently competes in the CIV Superbike Championship aboard a BMW S1000RR. He has previously competed in the Supersport World Championship and the European Superstock 600 Championship. In 2022 FIM Endurance World Championship he rides for Team 33 Louit April Moto in superstock category.

== Career ==
=== European Superstock 600 Championship ===
Gamarino made his European Superstock 600 Championship debut in 2011. He had a difficult rookie season and scored points in four races. His best finish of the season was a ninth-place finish at Misano. Gamarino finished 25th in the Championship. 2012 proved to be a breakthrough season for Gamarino as he finished eighth in the Championship with 61 points. He also scored his first podium finish at Misano. In 2013, Gamarino won his first Superstock 600 race at Silverstone. He contended for the Championship but eventually finished third to Franco Morbidelli and Alessandro Nocco.

=== Supersport World Championship ===
In 2014, Gamarino stepped up to the Supersport World Championship riding a Kawasaki ZX-6R for Team Go Eleven. He finished 15th in the championship scoring 27 points. Gamarino had a very consistent 2015 season and finished tenth in the Championship. Gamarino had a challenging 2016 season and dropped to 19th in the standings. He did however scored a career best finish of fourth at the season opener in Phillip Island.

== Career statistics ==
2011 - 25th, European Superstock 600 Championship, Kawasaki ZX-6R
2012 - 8th, European Superstock 600 Championship, Kawasaki ZX-6R
2013 - 3rd, European Superstock 600 Championship #18 Kawasaki ZX-6R

=== European Superstock 600 ===
==== Races by year ====
(key) (Races in bold indicate pole position, races in italics indicate fastest lap)

Year	Bike	1	2	3	4	5	6	7	8	9	10	Pos	Pts
2011	Kawasaki	ASS; Ret	MNZ; Ret	MIS; 9	ARA; 14	BRN; Ret	SIL; Ret	NÜR; 14	IMO; 15	MAG; 25	POR; Ret	25th	12
2012	Kawasaki	IMO; 9	ASS; Ret	MNZ; 12	MIS; 3	ARA; 10	BRN; 8	SIL; 8	NÜR; Ret	POR; 7	MAG; 13	8th	61
2013	Kawasaki	ARA; 7	ASS; 5	MNZ; 20	POR; 5	IMO; 3	SIL1; 2	SIL2; 1	NÜR; 3	MAG; 3	JER; 11	3rd	129

=== Supersport World Championship ===
==== Races by year ====
(key) (Races in bold indicate pole position) (Races in italics indicate fastest lap)

Year	Bike	1	2	3	4	5	6	7	8	9	10	11	12	Pos.	Pts
2014	Kawasaki	AUS; 10	SPA; 9	NED; Ret	ITA; 13	GBR; 19	MAL; 11	SMR; 15	POR; 17	SPA; 15	FRA; 14	QAT; 14		15th	27
2015	Kawasaki	AUS; 11	THA; 13	SPA; 9	NED; Ret	ITA; 11	GBR; 14	POR; 7	ITA; 7	MAL; 9	SPA; 8	FRA; 9	QAT; Ret	10th	62
2016	Kawasaki	AUS; 4	THA; 16	SPA; 10	NED; 10	ITA; 16	MAL; 11	GBR; Ret	ITA; Ret	GER; 19	FRA; Ret	SPA; 16	QAT; Ret	19th	30
2017	Honda	AUS; Ret	THA; Ret	SPA; 7	NED; 9	ITA; 7	GBR; Ret	ITA; Ret	GER; 12	POR; 6	FRA; 15	SPA	QAT	13th*	40*

* Season still in progress.

=== Suzuka 8 Hours ===
Year	Class	Team	Co-riders	Bike	Pos
2026	**EWC**	(France) Kawasaki Webike Tristar	(Spain) Román Ramos (France) Grégory Leblanc	Kawasaki ZX-10RR	TBD
