= Axel Bassani =

Italian motorcycle racer (born 1999)

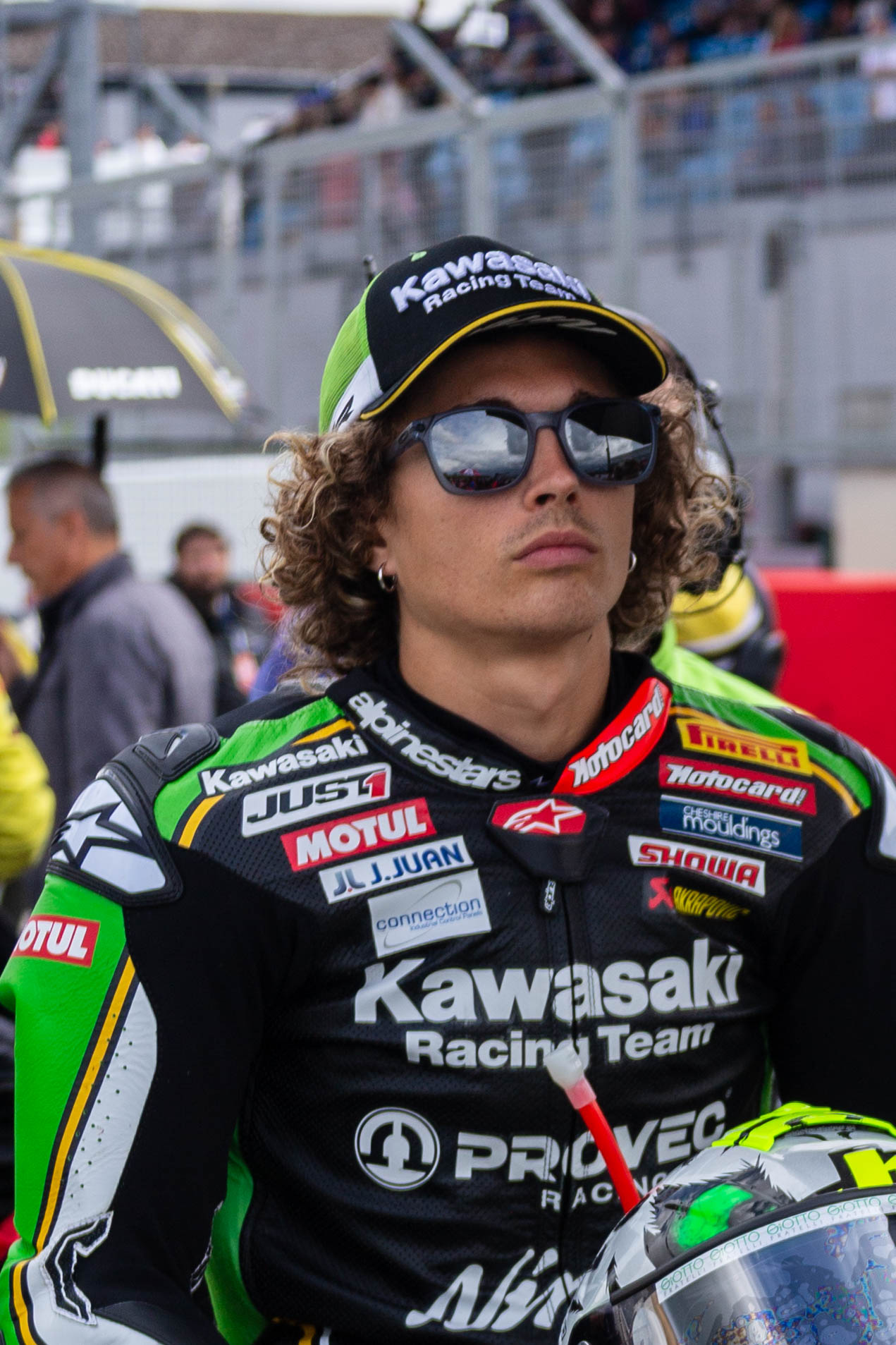
- Axel Bassani, Donington World Superbike 2024
- Nationality: Italian
- Born: 24 July 1999 (age 27); Feltre, Italy
- Current team: Bimota by Kawasaki Racing Team
- Bike number: 47
Motorcycle racing career statistics
Moto2 World Championship
Active years	2017
Manufacturers	Speed Up
Championships	0
2017 championship position	43rd (0 pts)
Starts / Wins / Podiums / Poles / F. laps / Points; 4 / 0 / 0 / 0 / 0 / 0
Superbike World Championship
Active years	2021–
Manufacturers	Ducati (2021–2023); Kawasaki (2024); Bimota (2025–)
Championships	0
2026 championship position	7th (222 pts)
Starts / Wins / Podiums / Poles / F. laps / Points; 217 / 0 / 8 / 0 / 1 / 1011
Supersport World Championship
Active years	2016–2017, 2020
Manufacturers	Kawasaki (2016–2017); Yamaha (2020)
Championships	0
2020 championship position	17th (33 pts)
Starts / Wins / Podiums / Poles / F. laps / Points; 24 / 0 / 0 / 0 / 0 / 99

Axel Bassani (born 24 July 1999) is an Italian motorcycle racer who is competing in the Superbike World Championship aboard a Bimota KB998 with Bimota by Kawasaki Racing Team for the 2026 season.

In 2022 and 2023, Bassani won the trophy for Best Independent rider. He was the FIM Europe Supersport Cup winner in 2016.

Bassani previously raced in the Supersport World Championship, the Moto2 World Championship, and the CIV Honda CBR600RR Trophy, where he was champion in 2015.

== Career ==
=== Early career ===
In 2015, Bassani competed in the final two races of the European Superstock 600 Championship on a Kawasaki ZX-6R with the team Berclaz Racing, achieving a second-place finish in the final round in France and finishing the championship in 15th place.

In 2016, Bassani joined the Supersport World Championship on a Kawasaki ZX-6R with San Carlo Team Italia, finishing first in the FIM Europe Cup and 12th overall.

In 2017, Bassani joined the Moto2 World Championship but split with his team after the first four races. He then went back to the Supersport World Championship and raced in Italy and Spain as a substitute rider.

In 2018, Bassani competed in the Campionato Italiano Velocità (CIV) on a BMW S1000RR with the team DMR Racing. He finished fifth overall and achieved a podium finish.

Bassani continued competing in the same class in 2019, on a Yamaha YZF-R1 with the team Yamaha Motoxracing. He finished eighth overall and achieved two podium finishes.

In 2020, Bassani went back to the Supersport World Championship, on a Yamaha YZF-R6 with the team Soradis Yamaha Motoxracing, finishing 17th overall.

=== Superbike World Championship ===
In 2021, Bassani joined the Superbike World Championship on a Ducati Panigale V4 R with the team Motocorsa Racing. His best result was a second-place finish in Catalunya. He finished second in the independent trophy and ninth overall.

Bassani continued racing for team Motocorsa Racing in 2022, achieving three podium finishes throughout the season, winning the independent trophy and finishing seventh overall.

Bassani then continued to race for Motocorsa racing in 2023, achieving one podium finish throughout the season, winning the independent rider trophy and finishing sixth in the overall championship.

In 2024, Bassani switched teams and manufacturer to join the Kawasaki Racing Team becoming teammates with Alex Lowes.

== Career statistics ==
=== CIV Honda CBR600RR Trophy ===
==== Races by year ====
(key) (Races in bold indicate pole position, races in italics indicate fastest lap)

Year	Bike	1	2	2	4	5	Pos	Pts
2015	Honda	VAL; 3	**MIS**; 1	**MUG1**; 2	IMO; 2	MUG2	1st	115

=== FIM European Superstock 600 ===
==== Races by year ====
(key) (Races in bold indicate pole position, races in italics indicate fastest lap)

Year	Bike	1	2	3	4	5	6	7	8	Pos	Pts
2015	Kawasaki	SPA	SPA	NED	ITA	POR	ITA	SPA; 6	FRA; 2	15th	30

=== Supersport World Championship ===
==== Races by year ====
(key) (Races in bold indicate pole position; races in italics indicate fastest lap)

Year	Bike	1	2	3	4	5	6	7	8	9	10	11	12	13	14	15	Pos	Pts
2016	Kawasaki	AUS	THA	SPA; 6	NED; 8	ITA; 13	MAL	GBR; 17	ITA; 7	GER; 15	FRA; 4	SPA; 5	QAT				12th	55
2017	Kawasaki	AUS	THA	SPA	NED	ITA	GBR	ITA; 7	GER	POR	FRA	SPA; 14	QAT				27th	11
2020	Yamaha	AUS	SPA; Ret	SPA; Ret	POR; 13	POR; 19	SPA; 18	SPA; Ret	SPA; 14	SPA; 13	SPA; 10	SPA; 12	FRA; 15	FRA; 14	POR; 8	POR; 12	17th	33

=== Grand Prix motorcycle racing ===
==== By season ====
Season	Class	Motorcycle	Team	Race	Win	Podium	Pole	FLap	Pts	Plcd
2017	Moto2	Speed Up	Speed Up Racing	4	0	0	0	0	0	43rd
Total				**4**	**0**	**0**	**0**	**0**	**0**	

==== Races by year ====
(key) (Races in bold indicate pole position; races in italics indicate fastest lap)

Year	Class	Bike	1	2	3	4	5	6	7	8	9	10	11	12	13	14	15	16	17	18	Pos	Pts
2017	Moto2	Speed Up	QAT	ARG; 25	AME; 24	SPA; 23	FRA; 24	ITA	CAT	NED	GER	CZE	AUT	GBR	RSM	ARA	JPN	AUS	MAL	VAL	43rd	0

=== European Superstock 1000 Championship ===
==== Races by year ====
(key) (Races in bold indicate pole position) (Races in italics indicate fastest lap)

Year	Bike	1	2	3	4	5	6	7	8	Pos	Pts
2018	BMW	ARA	NED	IMO	DON	BRN	MIS; 6	ALG	MAG	20th	10

=== Superbike World Championship ===
==== By season ====
Season	Motorcycle	Team	Race	Win	Podium	Pole	FLap	Pts	Plcd
2021	Ducati Panigale V4 R	Motocorsa Racing	37	0	1	0	0	210	9th
2022	Ducati Panigale V4 R	Motocorsa Racing	36	0	3	0	0	244	7th
2023	Ducati Panigale V4 R	Motocorsa Racing	36	0	2	0	1	249	6th
2024	Kawasaki Ninja ZX-10RR	Kawasaki Racing Team	36	0	0	0	0	108	14th
2025	Bimota KB998	Bimota by Kawasaki Racing Team	36	0	0	0	0	140	10th
2026	Bimota KB998	Bimota by Kawasaki Racing Team	36	0	2	0	0	222	7th
Total			**217**	**0**	**8**	**0**	**1**	**1173**	

==== Races by year ====
(key) (Races in bold indicate pole position; races in italics indicate fastest lap)

Year	Bike	1			2			3			4			5			6			7			8			9			10			11			12			13			Pos	Pts
Year	Bike	R1	SR	R2	R1	SR	R2	R1	SR	R2	R1	SR	R2	R1	SR	R2	R1	SR	R2	R1	SR	R2	R1	SR	R2	R1	SR	R2	R1	SR	R2	R1	SR	R2	R1	SR	R2	R1	SR	R2	Pos	Pts
2021	Ducati	SPA; 12	SPA; 17	SPA; 14	POR; 11	POR; 14	POR; 11	ITA; 7	ITA; 6	ITA; 7	GBR; 10	GBR; 11	GBR; 13	NED; 10	NED; 10	NED; 9	CZE; 5	CZE; 8	CZE; Ret	SPA; 8	SPA; 12	SPA; 10	FRA; 8	FRA; 11	FRA; 11	SPA; 2	SPA; 6	SPA; 8	SPA; 8	SPA; C	SPA; 6	POR; 7	POR; 7	POR; 9	ARG; 5	ARG; 4	ARG; 4	INA; 5	INA; C	INA; Ret	9th	210
2022	Ducati	SPA; 16	SPA; 7	SPA; 6	NED; 10	NED; 9	NED; 6	POR; 12	POR; 10	POR; 7	ITA; 4	ITA; 7	ITA; 7	GBR; 5	GBR; 12	GBR; 7	CZE; 5	CZE; 5	CZE; 5	FRA; 3	FRA; 6	FRA; 3	SPA; 8	SPA; 16	SPA; 5	POR; 4	POR; 6	POR; Ret	ARG; 3	ARG; 7	ARG; 20	INA; 8	INA; 5	INA; 5	AUS; 7	AUS; 13	AUS; 11				7th	244
2023	Ducati	AUS; 5	AUS; 9	AUS; 4	INA; 4	INA; 5	INA; 8	NED; 5	NED; 6	NED; 5	SPA; 7	SPA; 10	SPA; 11	ITA; 4	ITA; 4	ITA; 3	GBR; 7	GBR; 8	GBR; 7	ITA; 7	ITA; 6	ITA; 2	CZE; 7	CZE; 4	CZE; 4	FRA; 17	FRA; 8	FRA; 6	SPA; 9	SPA; 15	SPA; 5	POR; 13	POR; 11	POR; 12	SPA; Ret	SPA; Ret	SPA; 11				6th	249
2024	Kawasaki	AUS; 12	AUS; 11	AUS; 11	SPA; 10	SPA; 14	SPA; Ret	NED; 9	NED; 13	NED; 18	ITA; 11	ITA; 6	ITA; 7	GBR; 12	GBR; Ret	GBR; 10	CZE; 16	CZE; 13	CZE; Ret	POR; 8	POR; 12	POR; 15	FRA; 11	FRA; 10	FRA; 11	ITA; 5	ITA; 11	ITA; Ret	SPA; 12	SPA; 15	SPA; 12	POR; Ret	POR; 12	POR; 10	SPA; 8	SPA; 14	SPA; 10				14th	108
2025	Bimota	AUS; 9	AUS; 9	AUS; 10	POR; 9	POR; 11	POR; 7	NED; Ret	NED; 12	NED; 5	ITA; 9	ITA; 18	ITA; 15	CZE; 12	CZE; 18	CZE; 6	EMI; Ret	EMI; Ret	EMI; 12	GBR; 16	GBR; 14	GBR; 16	HUN; 10	HUN; 6	HUN; 9	FRA; 7	FRA; 8	FRA; 12	ARA; 8	ARA; 11	ARA; 9	POR; 11	POR; 8	POR; 8	SPA; 11	SPA; 10	SPA; 10				10th	140
2026	Bimota	AUS; 4	AUS; 2	AUS; 2	POR; 8	POR; 8	POR; 8	NED; 12	NED; 18	NED; 13	HUN; 17	HUN; 15	HUN; Ret	CZE; 5	CZE; 13	CZE; 8	ARA; 8	ARA; 6	ARA; 5	EMI; 4	EMI; 4	EMI; Ret	GBR; 9	GBR; 5	GBR; 4	FRA; 7	FRA; 11	FRA; 9	ITA; 8	ITA; 16	ITA; 9	POR; 7	POR; 6	POR; 5	SPA; 10	SPA; 12	SPA; 8				7th	222
