= Kyle Smith (motorcyclist) =

British motorcycle racer (born 1991)

- Nationality: British
- Born: Kyle David Smith; 16 September 1991 (age 35); Huddersfield, England
- Current team: Dynavolt Triumph
- Bike number: 11
- Website: kylesmithracing.co.uk
Motorcycle racing career statistics
Moto2 World Championship
Active years	2013
Manufacturers	Kalex
Championships	0
2013 championship position	NC (0 pts)
Starts / Wins / Podiums / Poles / F. laps / Points; 9 / 0 / 0 / 0 / 0 / 0
Superbike World Championship
Active years	2022
Manufacturers	Kawasaki
Championships	0
2022 championship position	25th (4 pts)
Starts / Wins / Podiums / Poles / F. laps / Points; 6 / 0 / 0 / 0 / 0 / 4
Supersport World Championship
Active years	2015–2020, 2022
Manufacturers	Honda, Kawasaki, Yamaha
Championships	0
2022 championship position	20th (35 pts)
Starts / Wins / Podiums / Poles / F. laps / Points; 76 / 3 / 10 / 2 / 5 / 475

Kyle David Smith (born 16 September 1991) is a British motorcycle racer. He competed in the British Supersport Championship aboard a Triumph 765 cc until a crash caused a broken pelvis in September 2021. He was the winner of the 2019 WorldSSP European Cup.

== Career ==
Smith has competed in the Spanish 125GP Championship, the Spanish Kawasaki Ninja Cup—where he was champion in 2009—and the Spanish Stock Extreme series, where he finished runner-up in 2012. After losing his ride in the Moto2 World Championship during the 2013 season he competed in the European Superstock 600 Championship for Agro-On Racedays aboard a Honda CBR600RR and the Spanish CEV Moto2 Championship for TSR Motorsports aboard a Kalex for the rest of the year. After spending a full season in the FIM Superstock 1000 Cup in 2014, in 2015 he competed in the Supersport World Championship for PATA Honda aboard a Honda CBR600RR—achieving his first win in the series in Losail—and he was second in the Suzuka 8 Hours endurance race with Dominique Aegerter and Joshua Hook. For 2016, he moved to the CIA Landlord Insurance Honda team.

== Career statistics ==
=== Superstock 1000 Cup ===
==== Races by year ====
(key) (Races in bold indicate pole position) (Races in italics indicate fastest lap)

Year	Bike	1	2	3	4	5	6	7	8	9	10	Pos	Pts
2010	KTM	ALG	VAL	NED	MNZ	SMR	BRN	SIL	NŰR	IMO; Ret	MAG	5th	0
2014	Honda	ARA; 3	NED; Ret	IMO; 16	MIS; 10	ALG; 4	JER; 2	MAG; Ret				8th	55

=== Grand Prix motorcycle racing ===
==== By season ====
Season	Class	Motorcycle	Team	Race	Win	Podium	Pole	FLap	Pts	Plcd	WCh
2013	Moto2	Kalex	Blusens Avintia	9	0	0	0	0	0	NC	–
Total				**9**	**0**	**0**	**0**	**0**	**0**		–

==== By class ====
Class	Seasons	1st GP	1st Pod	1st Win	Race	Win	Podiums	Pole	FLap	Pts	WChmp
Moto2	2013	2013 Qatar			9	0	0	0	0	0	–
Total					**9**	**0**	**0**	**0**	**0**	**0**	–

==== Races by year ====
(key) (Races in bold indicate pole position; races in italics indicate fastest lap)

Year	Class	Bike	1	2	3	4	5	6	7	8	9	10	11	12	13	14	15	16	17	Pos	Pts
2013	Moto2	Kalex	QAT; 21	AME; 20	SPA; Ret	FRA; Ret	ITA; 20	CAT; 17	NED; Ret	GER; Ret	INP; Ret	CZE	GBR	RSM	ARA	MAL	AUS	JPN	VAL	NC	0

=== European Superstock 600 ===
==== Races by year ====
(key) (Races in bold indicate pole position, races in italics indicate fastest lap)

Year	Bike	1	2	3	4	5	6	7	8	9	10	Pos	Pts
2013	Honda	ARA	ASS	MNZ	POR	IMO	SIL1	SIL2	NÜR; 6	MAG; 7	JER; 1	12th	44

=== Supersport World Championship ===
==== Races by year ====
(key) (Races in bold indicate pole position; races in italics indicate fastest lap)

Year	Bike	1	2	3	4	5	6	7	8	9	10	11	12	13	14	15	16	17	18	19	20	21	22	23	24	Pos	Pts
2015	Honda	AUS; 4	THA; Ret	SPA; 3	NED; 3	ITA; 15	GBR; Ret	POR; 6	ITA; Ret	MAL; 5	SPA; 4	FRA; 5	QAT; 1													5th	116
2016	Honda	AUS; Ret	THA; 5	SPA; 11	NED; 1	ITA; 10	MAL; 5	GBR; 6	ITA; Ret	GER; 9	FRA; 7	SPA; 3	QAT; 1													5th	125
2017	Honda	AUS; Ret	THA; DSQ	SPA; 16	NED; 11	ITA; 5	GBR; 8	ITA; 5	GER; 7	POR; Ret	FRA; 9	SPA; Ret	QAT; 10													9th	57
2018	Honda	AUS; 8	THA; Ret	SPA; 5	NED; Ret	ITA; 24	GBR; 13	CZE; 8	ITA; 7	POR; 3	FRA; 8	ARG; 7	QAT; Ret													8th	72
2019	Kawasaki	AUS	THA	SPA; 9	NED; Ret	ITA; 13	SPA; Ret	ITA; 19	GBR; Ret	POR; Ret	**FRA**; 9	ARG; 9	QAT; 9													15th	31
2020	Yamaha	AUS	SPA	SPA	POR	POR	SPA	SPA	SPA	SPA	SPA; 3	SPA; Ret	**FRA**; Ret	**FRA**; 2	POR	POR										15th	36
2022	Yamaha	SPA; 20	SPA; 20	NED; 16	NED; 8	POR; 11	POR; 2	ITA; Ret	ITA; 16	GBR; 14	GBR; Ret	CZE; 22	CZE; Ret	FRA; 17	FRA; 24	SPA	SPA	POR	POR	ARG	ARG	INA	INA	AUS	AUS	20th	53

=== FIM CEV Moto2 European Championship ===
==== By year ====
(key) (Races in bold indicate pole position) (Races in italics indicate fastest lap)

Year	Bike	1	2	3	4	5	6	7	8	9	10	11	Pos	Pts
2020	Kalex	EST1; Ret	EST2; DNS	POR1	POR2	JER1	JER2	ARA1	ARA2	ARA3	VAL1	VAL2	NC	0

=== Superbike World Championship ===
==== Races by year ====
(key) (Races in bold indicate pole position) (Races in italics indicate fastest lap)

Year	Bike	1			2			3			4			5			6			7			8			9			10			11			12			Pos	Pts
Year	Bike	R1	SR	R2	R1	SR	R2	R1	SR	R2	R1	SR	R2	R1	SR	R2	R1	SR	R2	R1	SR	R2	R1	SR	R2	R1	SR	R2	R1	SR	R2	R1	SR	R2	R1	SR	R2	Pos	Pts
2022	Kawasaki	SPA	SPA	SPA	NED	NED	NED	POR	POR	POR	ITA	ITA	ITA	GBR	GBR	GBR	CZE	CZE	CZE	FRA	FRA	FRA	SPA	SPA	SPA	POR	POR	POR	ARG	ARG	ARG	INA; Ret	INA; 19	INA; Ret	AUS; 12	AUS; 18	AUS; 18	25th	4
