= Federico Caricasulo =

Italian motorcycle racer

- Nationality: Italian
- Born: 6 April 1996 (age 30); Ravenna, Italy
- Current team: ZXMOTO Factory Evan Bros Racing
- Bike number: 64
Motorcycle racing career statistics
Moto2 World Championship
Active years	2014–2015
Manufacturers	TSR, Kalex
Championships	0
2015 championship position	NC (0 pts)
Starts / Wins / Podiums / Poles / F. laps / Points; 3 / 0 / 0 / 0 / 0 / 0
Superbike World Championship
Active years	2020
Manufacturers	Yamaha
Championships	0
2020 championship position	14th (58 pts)
Starts / Wins / Podiums / Poles / F. laps / Points; 24 / 0 / 0 / 0 / 0 / 58
Supersport World Championship
Active years	2016–2019, 2021–
Manufacturers	Honda, Yamaha, Ducati, MV Agusta, ZXMOTO
Championships	0
2025 championship position	18th (64 pts)
Starts / Wins / Podiums / Poles / F. laps / Points; 163 / 8 / 36 / 14 / 11 / 1442

Federico Caricasulo (born 6 April 1996 in Ravenna) is an Italian motorcycle racer. He has raced in the European Superstock 600 Championship, the Moto2 World Championship and the Supersport World Championship. He was the CIV Supersport champion in 2014.

== Career ==
In 2025, Caricasulo competed for the Motozoo ME Air Racing in Supersport World Championship.

== Career statistics ==
- 2014: 5th, European Superstock 600 Championship #64 Honda CBR600RR
- 2021: 3rd, Soradis Yamaha MotoxRacing (CIV Supersport 600) #64

=== Grand Prix motorcycle racing ===
==== By season ====
Season	Class	Motorcycle	Team	Race	Win	Podium	Pole	FLap	Pts	Plcd
2014	Moto2	TSR	Teluru Team JiR Webike	1	0	0	0	0	0	NC
2015	Moto2	Kalex	Italtrans Racing Team	2	0	0	0	0	0	NC
Total				**3**	**0**	**0**	**0**	**0**	**0**	

==== Races by year ====
(key) (Races in bold indicate pole position; races in italics indicate fastest lap)

Year	Class	Bike	1	2	3	4	5	6	7	8	9	10	11	12	13	14	15	16	17	18	Pos	Pts
2014	Moto2	TSR	QAT	AME	ARG	SPA	FRA	ITA	CAT	NED	GER	IND	CZE	GBR	RSM; 28	ARA	JPN	AUS	MAL	VAL	NC	0
2015	Moto2	Kalex	QAT	AME	ARG	SPA	FRA	ITA	CAT	NED	GER	IND	CZE	GBR; 26	RSM; Ret	ARA; DNS	JPN	AUS	MAL	VAL	NC	0

=== FIM European Superstock 600 ===
==== Races by year ====
(key) (Races in bold indicate pole position, races in italics indicate fastest lap)

Year	Bike	1	2	3	4	5	6	7	8	Pos	Pts
2014	Honda	SPA; DSQ	NED; Ret	IMO; 6	ITA; 2	POR; 3	SPA; 2	FRA; Ret		5th	66
2015	Honda	SPA; 3	SPA; 2	NED; 7	IMO; Ret	POR; 3	ITA; 1	SPA; DNS	FRA	3rd	86

=== Supersport World Championship ===
==== Races by year ====
(key) (Races in bold indicate pole position; races in italics indicate fastest lap)

Year	Bike	1	2	3	4	5	6	7	8	9	10	11	12	Pos	Pts
2016	Honda	AUS; 2	THA; 17	SPA; 7	NED; 11	ITA; 7	MAL; 10	GBR; 11	**ITA**; DSQ	GER; 5	FRA; 6	SPA; Ret	QAT; Ret	9th	75
2017	Yamaha	AUS; Ret	THA; 1	SPA; Ret	NED; 6	ITA; Ret	GBR; Ret	ITA; 3	GER; Ret	POR; 7	FRA; 2	**SPA**; 1	QAT; 4	5th	118
2018	Yamaha	AUS; 4	THA; 3	SPA; 2	NED; Ret	ITA; 2	GBR; 6	CZE; Ret	**ITA**; 1	POR; 2	**FRA**; 13	ARG; Ret	QAT; 3	5th	143
2019	Yamaha	**AUS**; 3	THA; 3	SPA; 3	NED; 1	ITA; 2	SPA; 1	ITA; 2	**GBR**; 2	**POR**; 1	FRA; Ret	ARG; 5	**QAT**; 4	2nd	207

Year	Bike	1		2		3		4		5		6		7		8		9		10		11		12		Pos	Pts
Year	Bike	R1	R2	R1	R2	R1	R2	R1	R2	R1	R2	R1	R2	R1	R2	R1	R2	R1	R2	R1	R2	R1	R2	R1	R2	Pos	Pts
2021	Yamaha	SPA; 6	SPA; 18	**POR**; 12	**POR**; 6	ITA; Ret	ITA; 9	NED; 8	NED; Ret	CZE; 5	CZE; 6	SPA; 5	SPA; 4	FRA; 6	FRA; 7	SPA; 18	SPA; 6	SPA; C	SPA; 5	POR; 14	POR; 3	ARG	ARG	INA; 3	INA; 4	8th	171
2022	Ducati	SPA; 8	SPA; 12	NED; 5	NED; 25	POR; 5	POR; Ret	ITA; Ret	ITA; 6	GBR; Ret	GBR; 4	CZE; Ret	CZE; 6	**FRA**; Ret	**FRA**; 9	SPA; 4	SPA; 6	POR; 3	POR; 4	ARG; 3	ARG; 2	INA; 2	INA; 7	**AUS**; 7	AUS; 2	5th	222
2023	Ducati	AUS; 10	AUS; Ret	INA; 2	INA; 1	NED; 6	NED; 3	SPA; 5	SPA; 6	EMI; 3	EMI; 4	GBR; 4	GBR; 3	**ITA**; Ret	**ITA**; Ret	CZE; 10	CZE; 11	FRA; 8	FRA; 10	SPA; 4	SPA; 3	POR; 6	POR; 5	JER; 3	JER; 5	4th	258
2024	MV Agusta	AUS; 4	AUS; 4	SPA; 6	SPA; 8	NED; 6	NED; 22	ITA; 7	ITA; 7	GBR; 16	GBR; 15	CZE; 5	CZE; 6	POR; 5	POR; 4	FRA; 2	FRA; Ret	ITA; Ret	ITA; 6	SPA; 8	SPA; 9	POR; 5	POR; 6	SPA; 24	SPA; Ret	7th	184
2025	MV Agusta	AUS	AUS	POR; 10	POR; 28	NED; 13	NED; 9	**ITA**; 14	ITA; 9	CZE; 25	CZE; 11															18th	64
2025	Ducati											EMI; 9	EMI; 9	GBR; Ret	GBR; 18	HUN; 12	HUN; DNS	FRA; Ret	FRA; Ret	ARA; 13	ARA; 10	POR; 28	POR; 13	SPA; 12	SPA; Ret	18th	64
2026	ZXMOTO	AUS; 14	AUS; 19	POR; 9	POR; 17	NED; Ret	NED; 16	HUN; 15	HUN; 16	CZE; 12	CZE; 10	ARA	ARA	EMI	EMI	GBR	GBR	FRA	FRA	ITA	ITA	EST	EST	SPA	SPA	18th*	20*

* Season still in progress.

=== Superbike World Championship ===
==== Races by year ====
(key) (Races in bold indicate pole position; races in italics indicate fastest lap)

Year	Bike	1			2			3			4			5			6			7			8			Pos	Pts
Year	Bike	R1	SR	R2	R1	SR	R2	R1	SR	R2	R1	SR	R2	R1	SR	R2	R1	SR	R2	R1	SR	R2	R1	SR	R2	Pos	Pts
2020	Yamaha	AUS; 12	AUS; 14	AUS; Ret	SPA; Ret	SPA; 16	SPA; 16	POR; 15	POR; 12	POR; 9	SPA; 9	SPA; 11	SPA; 13	SPA; 9	SPA; 12	SPA; 9	SPA; 15	SPA; Ret	SPA; 12	FRA; 11	FRA; Ret	FRA; 11	POR; Ret	POR; 12	POR; 9	14th	58
