= 2021 CIV Superbike Championship =

Motorcycle race season

2021 CIV Superbike Championship
Previous:	2020	Next:	2022
Support series: 2021 CIV Supersport 600 Championship; 2021 CIV Supersport 300 Championship; 2021 CIV Moto3 Championship

The 2021 campionato italiano velocità season is the 20th season. The season started on 17 April in Mugello and ends on 10 October in Vallelunga. The season consists of 6 events with 2 races. Michele Pirro wins his 5th title with the win of the first race at the second event in Mugello.

== Race calendar ==
All rounds were held in Italy.

Round	Circuit	Date
1	Autodromo Internazionale del Mugello	16-18 April
2	Misano World Circuit Marco Simoncelli	14-16 May
3	Autodromo Internazionale Enzo e Dino Ferrari	2-4 July
4	Misano World Circuit Marco Simoncelli	30 July - 1 August
5	Autodromo Internazionale del Mugello	27-19 August
6	ACI Vallelunga Circuit	8-10 October

== Entry list ==
EntryList
Team	Constructor	Motorcycle	No.	Rider	Rounds
(Italy) Broncos Racing Team	Ducati	Panigale V4 R	10	(Italy) Agostino Santoro	All
(Italy) Broncos Racing Team	Ducati	Panigale V4 R	84	(Italy) Riccardo Russo	6
(Italy) Broncos Racing Team	Ducati	Panigale V4 R	87	(Italy) Lorenzo Zanetti	1–5
(Italy) B Max Racing	BMW	M1000RR	16	(Italy) Gabriele Ruiu	All
(Italy) B Max Racing	BMW	M1000RR	75	(Italy) Francesco Cocco	1
(Italy) DMR Racing	Honda	CBR1000RR-R	21	(Italy) Alessandro Andreozzi	1, 3–4, 6
(Italy) DMR Racing	Honda	CBR1000RR-R	52	(Italy) Alessandro Delbianco	All
(Italy) DMR Racing	Honda	CBR1000RR-R	136	(Argentina) Leandro Mercado	2
(Italy) Keope Motor Team	Yamaha	YZF-R1	27	(Italy) Mattia Casadei	6
(Italy) Keope Motor Team	Yamaha	YZF-R1	59	(Italy) Niccolò Canepa	5
(Italy) Nuova M2 Racing	Aprilia	Aprilia RSV4 RF	33	(Italy) Flavio Ferroni	All
(Italy) Nuova M2 Racing	Aprilia	Aprilia RSV4 RF	81	(Italy) Alex Bernardi	All
(Italy) Nuova M2 Racing	Aprilia	Aprilia RSV4 RF	84	(Italy) Riccardo Russo	1–4
(Italy) Althea Racing Team	Honda	CBR1000RR-R	36	(Italy) Lorenzo Gabellini	All
(Italy) Kawasaki Puccetti Racing	Kawasaki	Ninja ZX-10RR	44	(France) Lucas Mahias	1
(Italy) Barni Racing Team	Ducati	Panigale V4 R	51	(Italy) Michele Pirro	All
(Italy) Penta Motorsport	Suzuki	GSX-R1000R	65	(Italy) Michael Canducci	1–2
(Italy) Penta Motorsport	Suzuki	GSX-R1000R	131	(Italy) Agatino Alex Sgroi	4–6
(Italy) Penta Motorsport	Suzuki	GSX-R1000R	181	(Italy) Sebastiano Zerbo	3
(Italy) Scuderia Improve by TenJob	Honda	CBR1000RR-R	70	(Italy) Luca Vitali	All
(Italy) CheryBox24 Guandalini RC	BMW	M1000RR	86	(Italy) Ayrton Badovini	All

Key
Regular rider
Wildcard rider
Replacement rider

- All entries use Pirelli tyres.

== Results ==
Round		Circuit	Pole	Winning rider	Fastest lap	Winning team	Winning Constructor
1	R1	Mugello 1	(France) Lucas Mahias	(Italy) Michele Pirro (Note: Lucas Mahias won the race but due to him being a Wild Card Entry he competed outside the classification.)	(France) Lucas Mahias	(Italy) Barni Racing Team (Note: Lucas Mahias won the race but due to him being a Wild Card Entry he competed outside the classification, therefore also Kawasaki Puccetti Racing competed outside the classification.)	(Italy) Ducati (Note: Lucas Mahias won the race but due to him being a Wild Card Entry he competed outside the classification, therefore also Kawasaki competed outside the classification.)
1	R2	Mugello 1	(France) Lucas Mahias	(Italy) Michele Pirro	(France) Lucas Mahias	(Italy) Barni Racing Team	(Italy) Ducati
2	R1	Misano 1	(Italy) Alessandro Delbianco	(Italy) Michele Pirro	(Italy) Alessandro Delbianco	(Italy) Barni Racing Team	(Italy) Ducati
2	R2	Misano 1	(Italy) Alessandro Delbianco	(Italy) Michele Pirro	(Italy) Michele Pirro	(Italy) Barni Racing Team	(Italy) Ducati
3	R1	Imola	(Italy) Michele Pirro	(Italy) Michele Pirro	(Italy) Lorenzo Zanetti	(Italy) Barni Racing Team	(Italy) Ducati
3	R2	Imola	(Italy) Michele Pirro	(Italy) Lorenzo Zanetti	(Italy) Riccardo Russo	(Italy) Broncos Racing Team	(Italy) Ducati
4	R1	Misano 2	(Italy) Alessandro Delbianco	(Italy) Michele Pirro	(Italy) Michele Pirro	(Italy) Barni Racing Team	(Italy) Ducati
4	R2	Misano 2	(Italy) Alessandro Delbianco	(Italy) Michele Pirro	(Italy) Michele Pirro	(Italy) Barni Racing Team	(Italy) Ducati
5	R1	Mugello 2	(Italy) Alessandro Delbianco	(Italy) Michele Pirro	(Italy) Michele Pirro	(Italy) Barni Racing Team	(Italy) Ducati
5	R2	Mugello 2	(Italy) Michele Pirro	(Italy) Michele Pirro	(Italy) Michele Pirro	(Italy) Barni Racing Team	(Italy) Ducati
6	R1	Vallelunga	(Italy) Alessandro Delbianco	(Italy) Michele Pirro	(Italy) Michele Pirro	(Italy) Barni Racing Team	(Italy) Ducati
6	R2	Vallelunga	(Italy) Alessandro Delbianco	(Italy) Michele Pirro	(Italy) Alessandro Delbianco	(Italy) Barni Racing Team	(Italy) Ducati

== Championship standings ==
=== Riders' standings ===
Position	1st	2nd	3rd	4th	5th	6th	7th	8th	9th	10th	11th	12th	13th	14th	15th
Points	25	20	16	13	11	10	9	8	7	6	5	4	3	2	1

Pos.	Rider	Manufacturer	MUG		MIS		IMO		MIS		MUG		VAL		Pts.
1	(Italy) Michele Pirro	Ducati	1	1	1	1	1	2	1	1	1	1	1	1	293
2	(Italy) Alessandro Delbianco	Honda	6	Ret	2	2	10	7	3	2	3	10	2	2	163
3	(Italy) Lorenzo Zanetti	Ducati	4	5	4	4	2	1	2	3	11	8			144
4	(Italy) Lorenzo Gabellini	Honda	Ret	3	5	3	5	3	6	4	4	4	5	4	143
5	(Italy) Luca Vitali	Honda	3	2	3	9	3	Ret	4	7	5	2	4	Ret	141
6	(Italy) Flavio Ferroni	Aprilia	2	12	7	Ret	8	6	5	5	2	Ret	Ret	Ret	93
7	(Italy) Alex Bernardi	Aprilia	7	8	9	8	Ret	DNS	8	6	9	7	7	3	91
8	(Italy) Ayrton Badovini	BMW	10	9	6	6	6	4	Ret	9	7	5	Ret	8	91
9	(Italy) Gabriele Ruiu	BMW	Ret	4	11	5	4	Ret	9	10	8	Ret	3	6	89
10	(Italy) Riccardo Russo	Aprilia	8	10	8	7	7	5	Ret	8					76
10	(Italy) Riccardo Russo	Ducati											8	7	76
11	(Italy) Agostino Santoro	Ducati	9	6	10	Ret	Ret	Ret	Ret	11	6	6	Ret	9	55
12	(Italy) Agatino Alex Sgroi	Suzuki							10	12	10	9	9	10	36
13	(Italy) Alessandro Andreozzi	Honda	5	7			11	DNS	7	Ret					34
14	(Italy) Mattia Casadei	Yamaha											6	5	21
15	(Italy) Niccolò Canepa	Yamaha									Ret	3			16
16	(Italy) Sebastiano Zerbo	Suzuki					9	8							15
17	(Italy) Michael Canducci	Suzuki	11	11	Ret	Ret									10
	(Italy) Francesco Cocco	BMW	Ret	DNS											0
	(Argentina) Leandro Mercado	Honda			Ret	Ret									0
Wildcard entries ineligible for points
Pos.	Rider	Manufacturer	MUG		MIS		IMO		MIS		MUG		VAL		Pts.

=== Manufacturers' standings ===
Pos.	Manufacturer	MUG		MIS		IMO		MIS		MUG		VAL		Pts.
1	(Italy) Ducati	1	1	1	1	1	1	1	1	1	1	1	1	300
2	(Japan) Honda	3	2	2	2	3	3	3	2	3	2	2	2	220
3	(Italy) Aprilia	2	8	7	7	7	5	5	5	2	7	7	3	142
4	(Germany) BMW	10	4	6	5	4	4	9	9	7	5	3	6	126
5	(Japan) Suzuki	11	11	Ret	Ret	9	8	10	12	10	9	9	10	61
6	(Japan) Yamaha									Ret	3	6	5	37
Pos.	Manufacturer	MUG		MIS		IMO		MIS		MUG		VAL		Pts.
