= Kevin Manfredi =

Italian motorcycle racer (born 1995)

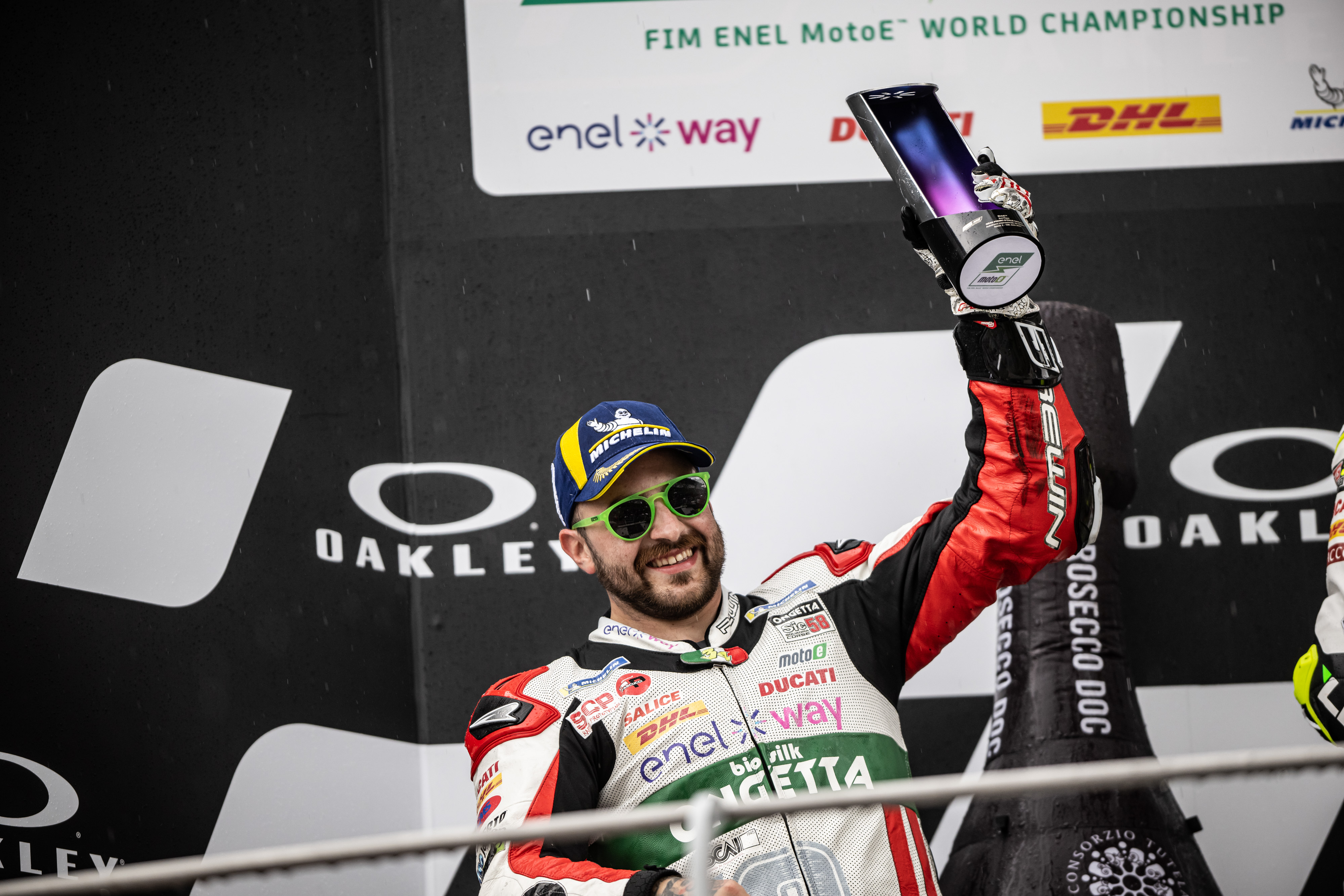
- Manfredi in 2023
- Nationality: Italian
- Born: 3 January 1995 (age 31); Sarzana, Italy
- Current team: Ongetta Sic58 Squadracorse
- Bike number: 34
Motorcycle racing career statistics
MotoE World Championship
Active years	2022–
Manufacturers	Energica, Ducati
2024 championship position	15th (56 pts)
Starts / Wins / Podiums / Poles / F. laps / Points; 44 / 0 / 2 / 0 / 1 / 231.5
Supersport World Championship
Active years	2019–2021
Manufacturers	Yamaha
Championships	0
2021 championship position	17th (36 pts)
Starts / Wins / Podiums / Poles / F. laps / Points; 30 / 0 / 0 / 0 / 0 / 83

Kevin Manfredi (born 3 January 1995) is an Italian Grand Prix motorcycle racer, competing in the MotoE World Cup for the Ongetta Sic58 Squadracorse. In the 2022 FIM Endurance World Championship, he rode for Polish based Wojcik Racing Team in superstock category. He is the winner of the 2020 and 2021 WorldSSP Challenge.

== Career statistics ==
=== FIM European Superstock 600 ===
==== Races by year ====
(key) (Races in bold indicate pole position, races in italics indicate fastest lap)

Year	Bike	1	2	3	4	5	6	7	8	Pos	Pts
2014	Honda	SPA; 9	NED; 2	IMO; Ret	ITA; 8	POR; Ret	SPA; 13	FRA; Ret		9th	38
2015	Honda	SPA; 7	SPA; 23	NED; Ret	ITA; 8	POR; 17	ITA	SPA	FRA	22nd	17

=== Supersport World Championship ===
==== Races by year ====
(key) (Races in bold indicate pole position, races in italics indicate fastest lap)

Year	Bike	1	2	3	4	5	6	7	8	9	10	11	12	Pos	Pts
2015	Honda	AUS	THA	SPA	NED	ITA	GBR	POR	ITA; 18	MAL	SPA; Ret	FRA; DNS	QAT; 15	34th	1
2016	Suzuki	AUS	THA	SPA	NED	ITA	MAL	GBR	ITA; 12	GER	FRA	SPA	QAT	34th	4
2019	Yamaha	AUS	THA	SPA	NED	ITA	SPA	ITA; 8	GBR	POR	FRA	ARG	QAT	23rd	8

Year	Bike	1		2		3		4		5		6		7		8		9		10		11		12		Pos	Pts
Year	Bike	R1	R2	R1	R2	R1	R2	R1	R2	R1	R2	R1	R2	R1	R2	R1	R2	R1	R2	R1	R2	R1	R2	R1	R2	Pos	Pts
2020	Yamaha	AUS		SPA	SPA	POR; Ret	POR; 13	SPA	SPA	SPA; 13	SPA; Ret	SPA; 5	SPA; 13	FRA; 5	FRA; 10	POR; 14	POR; 18									14th	39
2021	Yamaha	SPA; 13	SPA; 12	POR; Ret	POR; 14	ITA; 12	ITA; Ret	NED; 15	NED; 11	CZE; 13	CZE; Ret	SPA; 17	SPA; 19	FRA; 12	FRA; 11	SPA; 30	SPA; Ret	SPA; C	SPA; 17	POR; Ret	POR; 11	ARG	ARG	INA	INA	17th	36

=== European Superstock 1000 Championship ===
==== Races by year ====
(key) (Races in bold indicate pole position) (Races in italics indicate fastest lap)

Year	Bike	1	2	3	4	5	6	7	8	9	Pos	Pts
2017	Kawasaki	ARA; Ret	NED; Ret	IMO; Ret	DON; 13	MIS; Ret	LAU	ALG	MAG	JER	29th	3

=== Grand Prix motorcycle racing ===
==== By season ====
Season	Class	Motorcycle	Team	Race	Win	Podium	Pole	FLap	Pts	Plcd
2022	MotoE	Energica Ego Corsa	Octo Pramac MotoE	12	0	0	0	0	58.5	12th
2023	MotoE	Ducati V21L	Ongetta Sic58 Squadracorse	16	0	2	0	1	117	10th
2024	MotoE	Ducati V21L	Ongetta Sic58 Squadracorse	16	0	0	0	0	56	15th
Total				**44**	**0**	**2**	**0**	**1**	**231.5**	

==== By class ====
Class	Seasons	1st GP	1st Pod	1st Win	Race	Win	Podiums	Pole	FLap	Pts	WChmp
MotoE	2022–present	2022 Spain	2023 Italy		44	0	2	0	1	231.5	0
Total	2022–present				**44**	**0**	**2**	**0**	**1**	**231.5**	**0**

==== Races by year ====
(key) (Races in bold indicate pole position; races in italics indicate fastest lap)

Year	Class	Bike	1	2	3	4	5	6	7	8	9	10	11	12	13	14	15	16	Pos	Pts
2022	MotoE	Energica	SPA1; 13	SPA2; 10	FRA1; 13	FRA2; 16	ITA1; 10	ITA2; 9	NED1; 11	NED2; 7^{‡}	AUT1; 10	AUT2; 11	RSM1; 8	RSM2; 11					12th	58.5
2023	MotoE	Ducati	FRA1; 7	FRA2; Ret	ITA1; 7	ITA2; 2	GER1; 12	GER2; 13	NED1; 13	NED2; 10	GBR1; 2	GBR2; 9	AUT1; 9	AUT2; 10	CAT1; 10	CAT2; 12	RSM1; 4	RSM2; 18	10th	117
2024	MotoE	Ducati	POR1; 8	POR2; 14	FRA1; 10	FRA2; 11	CAT1; 11	CAT2; 10	ITA1; 13	ITA2; 14	NED1; 10	NED2; 15	GER1; 15	GER2; 13	AUT1; 14	AUT2; 15	RSM1; 13	RSM2; 14	15th	56

^{‡} Half points awarded as less than two thirds of the race distance (but at least three full laps) was completed.

=== CIV National Championship ===
==== Races by year ====
(key) (Races in bold indicate pole position; races in italics indicate fastest lap)

Year	Class	Bike	1	2	3	4	5	6	7	8	9	10	11	12	Pos	Pts
2011	Stock 600	Honda	MIS	MON	MIS	MIS	MUG; 12	MUG; 12	VAL	MUG; 24					22nd	8
2012	Stock 600	Honda / Yamaha	MUG; 23	IMO	MON; 20	MUG; 20	MUG; 19	MIS; DNS	MIS; Ret	VAL; 11					28th	5
2014	Supersport	Honda	MUG	MUG	VAL	VAL	IMO	IMO	MIS; Ret	MIS; Ret	MUG; 12	MUG; 6			21st	14
2016	Supersport	Suzuki	VAL; 10	VAL; 6	MUG; 12	MUG; 12	MIS; 3	MIS; 2	IMO; DSQ	IMO; DSQ	MUG; Ret	MUG; 21			10th	60
2017	Superbike	Suzuki	IMO	IMO	MIS	MIS	MUG	MUG	MIS; Ret	MIS; Ret	MUG; Ret	MUG; Ret	VAL; 11	VAL; 13	23rd	8
2018	Supersport	Yamaha	MIS; 1	MIS; 3	MUG; 8	MUG; 6	**IMO**; 1	**IMO**; DNS	MIS; 7	MIS; 10	MUG; 3	MUG; 11	VAL; 2	VAL; 7	5th	149
2019	Supersport	Yamaha	MIS; 5	MIS; 3	MUG; 1	MUG; 4	IMO; 4	IMO; 3	MIS; 4	MIS; 2	MUG	MUG	VAL; Ret	VAL; 8	4th	135
2020	Supersport	MV Agusta	MUG; Ret	MUG; 13	MIS; 11	MIS; Ret	IMO	IMO	VAL	VAL					23rd	8
2021	Supersport 600	Yamaha	MUG; 12	MUG; 11	MIS; 8	MIS; 20	IMO; 4	IMO; 2	MIS; 6	MIS; Ret	MUG; 9	MUG; 5	VAL; 7	VAL; 7	8th	96
2022	Superbike	Suzuki	MIS	MIS	VAL; 9	VAL; 7	MUG; 8	MUG; 8	MIS; 11	MIS; 10	MUG	MUG	IMO; 10	IMO; 6	13th	59
2023	Superbike	Suzuki	MIS; 2	MIS; 5	MUG; WD	MUG; WD	VAL	VAL	MIS; Ret	MIS; 6	MUG	MUG	IMO; 6	IMO; Ret	12th	51
2024	Superbike	Suzuki	MIS; Ret	MIS; 9	VAL	VAL	MUG; Ret	MUG; DNS	MIS; 11	MIS; Ret	MUG; 9	MUG; Ret	IMO; 10	IMO; 9	16th	32
2025	Superbike	Honda	MIS; 6	MIS; 7	MUG; Ret	MUG; Ret	VAL; Ret	VAL; Ret	MIS; 6	MIS; 6	IMO; Ret	IMO; 3	MUG; 8	MUG; 6	7th	86

=== FIM Endurance World Cup ===
Year	Team	Bike	Tyre	Rider	Pts	TC
2025	(France) Kaedear-Dafy-Rac41-Honda	Honda CBR1000RR	**D**	(Luxembourg) Chris Leesch (Italy) Kevin Manfredi (Japan) Takeshi Ishizuka (France) Diego Poncet	115	2nd

=== Suzuka 8 Hours results ===
Year	Class	Team	Co-riders	Bike	Pos
2025	**SST**	(France) Kaedear-Dafy-Rac41-Honda	(Luxembourg) Chris Leesch (Japan) Takeshi Ishizuka	Honda CBR1000RR-R	21st
2026	**SST**	(France) Kaedear-Dafy-Rac41-Honda	(Japan) Takeshi Ishizuka (France) Diego Poncet	Honda CBR1000RR-R	31st
