= Lorenzo Zanetti =

Italian motorcycle racer

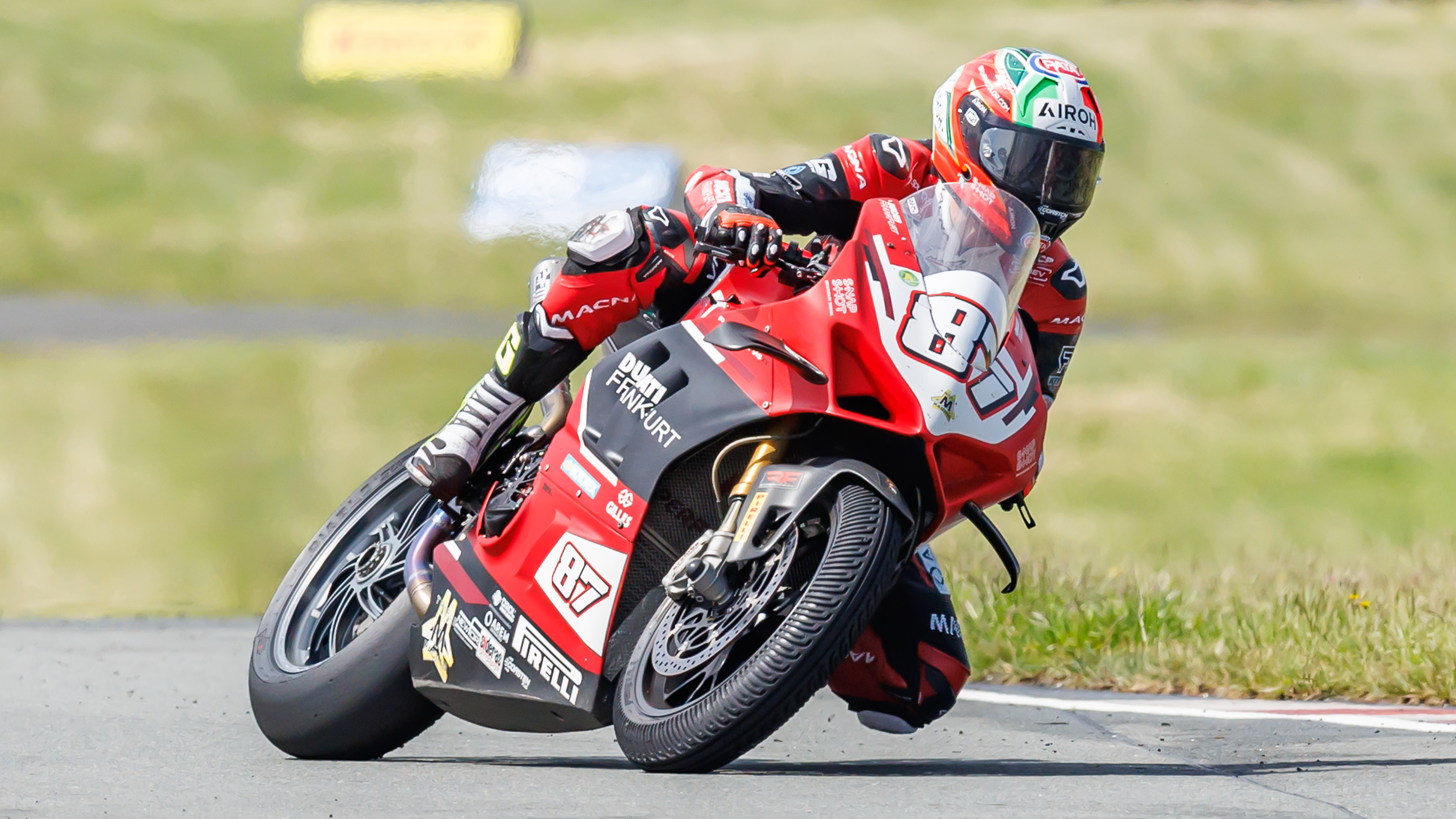
- Zanetti at the Schleizer Dreieck in 2025
- Nationality: Italian
- Born: 10 August 1987 (age 39); Brescia, Italy
- Current team: Triple M Racing Ducati Frankfurt
- Bike number: 87
- Website: lorenzozanetti.com
Motorcycle racing career statistics
125cc World Championship
Active years	2004–2009
Manufacturers	Honda, Aprilia, KTM
Championships	0
2009 championship position	19th (37 pts)
Starts / Wins / Podiums / Poles / F. laps / Points; 73 / 0 / 0 / 0 / 0 / 138
Superbike World Championship
Active years	2012, 2019–2020
Manufacturers	Ducati
Championships	0
2020 championship position	26th (3 pts)
Starts / Wins / Podiums / Poles / F. laps / Points; 35 / 0 / 0 / 0 / 0 / 92
Supersport World Championship
Active years	2013–2017
Manufacturers	Honda, MV Agusta
Championships	0
2017 championship position	16th (33 pts)
Starts / Wins / Podiums / Poles / F. laps / Points; 51 / 1 / 8 / 0 / 2 / 472

Lorenzo Demetrio Zanetti (born 10 August 1987) is an Italian motorcycle racer. He currently races in the CIV Superbike Championship, aboard a Ducati 1199 Panigale.

== Racing career ==
Born in Brescia, Zanetti finished second behind Luca Di Giuseppe in the Honda RS125 GP Trophy in 2003 and won the title the following year. In the same seasons, he competed in the Italian 125 GP Championship, and in 2004, he made his debut in the 125cc World Championship; he raced in the latter series until the end of 2009. In 2010, he was second in the Italian Stock 600 Championship and debuted in the FIM Superstock 1000 Cup, finishing in third position in 2011.

For 2012, Zanetti moved to the Superbike World Championship, and then in 2013 to the Supersport World Championship. On 21 July 2013, during the race held in Moscow, he was involved in the accident which resulted in the death of Andrea Antonelli. He continued to race in the same championship for 2014, 2015 and 2016.

== Racing record ==
=== Career summary ===
Season	Series	Team	Bikes	Races	Poles	Wins	Points	Position
2001	CIV 125GP		Honda	2	0	0	0	NC
2002	CIV 125GP		Honda	5	0	0	2	30th
2003	CIV 125GP		Honda	5	0	0	24	9th
2003	Honda RS125 GP Trophy		Honda	?	?	?	?	**2nd**
2004	CIV 125GP		Honda	3	0	0	20	13th
2004	European 125cc		Honda	?	?	?	5	31st
2004	Honda RS125 GP Trophy		Honda	?	?	?	?	**1st**
2004	125cc Grand Prix	Swiss MTR	Honda	1	0	0	0	NC
2004	125cc Grand Prix	Sterilgarda Racing	Aprilia	7	0	0	0	NC
2005	125cc Grand Prix	Skilled I.S.P.A. Racing Team	Aprilia	14	0	0	30	17th
2006	125cc Grand Prix	Skilled I.S.P.A. Racing Team	Aprilia	16	0	0	19	21st
2007	125cc Grand Prix	Team Sicilia	Aprilia	17	0	0	30	19th
2008	125cc Grand Prix	ISPA KTM Aran	KTM	17	0	0	22	22nd
2009	125cc Grand Prix	Ongetta Team I.S.P.A.	Aprilia	16	0	0	37	19th
2010	CIV Stock 600	TNT Racing	Yamaha	7	1	1	125	**2nd**
2010	Superstock 1000 Cup	SS Lazio Motorsport	Ducati	5	0	0	66	7th
2011	CIV Stock 1000	BMW Motorrad Italia	BMW	2	0	1	41	11th
2011	Superstock 1000 Cup	BMW Motorrad Italia	BMW	10	0	1	148	**3rd**
2012	Superbike World Championship	PATA Racing	Ducati	27	0	0	68	17th
2013	Supersport World Championship	PATA Honda World Supersport	Honda	12	0	0	119	5th
2014	Supersport World Championship	PATA Honda World Supersport	Honda	10	0	1	112	4th
2015	Supersport World Championship	MV Agusta Reparto Corse	MV Agusta	12	0	0	158	**3rd**
2016	Supersport World Championship	MV Agusta Reparto Corse	MV Agusta	10	0	0	50	13th
2016	Supersport World Championship	GRT Racing Team	MV Agusta	2	0	0	50	13th
2017	CIV Superbike	Motocorsa Racing	Ducati	12	3	1	158	**2nd**
2017	Supersport World Championship	Team Factory Vamag	MV Agusta	5	0	0	33	16th
2018	CIV Superbike	Motocorsa Racing	Ducati	12	2	2	179	**3rd**
2019	CIV Superbike	Broncos Racing Team	Ducati	12	0	0	135	**3rd**
2019	Superbike World Championship	Motocorsa Racing	Ducati	2	0	0	21	20th
2019	Superbike World Championship	Team GoEleven	Ducati	3	0	0	21	20th
2020	CIV Superbike	Broncos Racing Team	Ducati	6	0	0	68	7th
2020	Superbike World Championship	Motocorsa Racing	Ducati	3	0	0	3	26th
2020	MotoAmerica Superbike	Warhorse HSBK Racing Ducati New York	Ducati	8	0	1	118	9th
2021	CIV Superbike	Broncos Racing Team	Ducati	10	0	1	144	**3rd**
2022	CIV Superbike	Broncos Racing Team	Ducati	6	0	1	67	10th
2023	CIV Superbike	Broncos Racing Team	Ducati	12	0	2	206	**1st**

- Italian championship results taken from storicociv.perugiatiming.com
- 125cc results taken from MotoGP.com
- Superstock 1000, Superbike and Supersport results taken from WorldSBK.com

=== Grand Prix motorcycle racing ===
==== Races by year ====
(key) (Races in bold indicate pole position, races in italics indicate fastest lap)

Year	Class	Bike	1	2	3	4	5	6	7	8	9	10	11	12	13	14	15	16	17	Pos	Pts
2004	125cc	Honda	RSA	SPA	FRA	ITA; Ret	CAT	NED	BRA	GER	GBR									NC	0
2004	125cc	Aprilia										CZE; 21	POR; 19	JPN; 21	QAT; 21	MAL; 20	AUS; 24	VAL; 17		NC	0
2005	125cc	Aprilia	SPA; Ret	POR; DNS	CHN	FRA; 11	ITA; 14	CAT; 9	NED; 19	GBR; 14	GER; 13	CZE; 5	JPN; 17	MAL; 20	QAT; 16	AUS; 20	TUR; Ret	VAL; Ret		17th	30
2006	125cc	Aprilia	SPA; 13	QAT; 21	TUR; 8	CHN; Ret	FRA; Ret	ITA; 14	CAT; 15	NED; 17	GBR; 15	GER; 17	CZE; Ret	MAL; Ret	AUS; 19	JPN; Ret	POR; 13	VAL; 15		21st	19
2007	125cc	Aprilia	QAT; 18	SPA; 10	TUR; 7	CHN; 15	FRA; 16	ITA; 10	CAT; 14	GBR; 11	NED; 15	GER; 28	CZE; 17	SMR; 16	POR; 17	JPN; Ret	AUS; 18	MAL; 19	VAL; Ret	19th	30
2008	125cc	KTM	QAT; 21	SPA; Ret	POR; Ret	CHN; Ret	FRA; 7	ITA; 20	CAT; Ret	GBR; 15	NED; Ret	GER; Ret	CZE; 19	SMR; Ret	INP; Ret	JPN; 17	AUS; 12	MAL; 13	VAL; 11	22nd	22
2009	125cc	Aprilia	QAT; 19	JPN; 14	SPA; 18	FRA; 10	ITA; 12	CAT; Ret	NED; 15	GER; Ret	GBR; 7	CZE; Ret	INP; 17	SMR; 14	POR; 13	AUS; 17	MAL; 10	VAL; 12		19th	37

=== Superstock 1000 Cup ===
==== Races by year ====
(key) (Races in bold indicate pole position) (Races in italics indicate fastest lap)

Year	Bike	1	2	3	4	5	6	7	8	9	10	Pos	Pts
2010	Ducati	ALG	VAL	NED	MNZ	SMR	BRN; 2	SIL; 4	NŰR; Ret	IMO; 2	MAG; 4	7th	66
2011	BMW	NED; 9	MNZ; 1	SMR; 3	ARA; 2	BRN; 3	SIL; 2	NŰR; 4	IMO; Ret	MAG; 2	ALG; 5	3rd	148

=== Superbike World Championship ===
==== Races by year ====
(key) (Races in bold indicate pole position, races in italics indicate fastest lap)

Year	Bike	1		2		3		4		5		6		7		8		9		10		11		12		13		14		Pos	Pts
Year	Bike	R1	R2	R1	R2	R1	R2	R1	R2	R1	R2	R1	R2	R1	R2	R1	R2	R1	R2	R1	R2	R1	R2	R1	R2	R1	R2	R1	R2	Pos	Pts
2012	Ducati	AUS; 11	AUS; 14	ITA; 8	ITA; 13	NED; 14	NED; Ret	ITA; C	ITA; 14	EUR; 18	EUR; 12	USA; Ret	USA; Ret	SMR; Ret	SMR; Ret	SPA; 13	SPA; 14	CZE; 16	CZE; 16	GBR; 12	GBR; 16	RUS; 8	RUS; 10	GER; 8	GER; 11	POR; 16	POR; 12	FRA; Ret	FRA; 13	17th	68

Year	Bike	1			2			3			4			5			6			7			8			9			10			11			12			13			Pos	Pts
Year	Bike	R1	SR	R2	R1	SR	R2	R1	SR	R2	R1	SR	R2	R1	SR	R2	R1	SR	R2	R1	SR	R2	R1	SR	R2	R1	SR	R2	R1	SR	R2	R1	SR	R2	R1	SR	R2	R1	SR	R2	Pos	Pts
2019	Ducati	AUS	AUS	AUS	THA	THA	THA	SPA	SPA	SPA	NED	NED	NED	ITA; 9	ITA; 12	ITA; C	SPA	SPA	SPA	ITA; 9	ITA; 10	ITA; 9	GBR	GBR	GBR	USA	USA	USA	POR	POR	POR	FRA	FRA	FRA	ARG	ARG	ARG	QAT	QAT	QAT	20th	21
2020	Ducati	AUS	AUS	AUS	SPA	SPA	SPA	POR	POR	POR	SPA	SPA	SPA	SPA	SPA	SPA	SPA; 17	SPA; 13	SPA; 13	FRA	FRA	FRA	POR	POR	POR																26th	3

=== Supersport World Championship ===
==== Races by year ====
(key) (Races in bold indicate pole position, races in italics indicate fastest lap)

Year	Bike	1	2	3	4	5	6	7	8	9	10	11	12	13	Pos	Pts
2013	Honda	AUS; 8	SPA; 6	NED; 10	ITA; 3	GBR; 4	POR; 14	ITA; 4	RUS; C	GBR; 11	GER; 4	TUR; 4	FRA; 7	SPA; 5	5th	119
2014	Honda	AUS; DNS	SPA; 4	NED; 5	ITA; 1	GBR; Ret	MAL; 5	ITA; 6	POR; 6	SPA; 6	FRA; 4	QAT; 7			4th	112
2015	MV Agusta	AUS; 2	THA; Ret	SPA; 5	NED; 6	ITA; 3	GBR; 4	POR; 5	ITA; 3	MAL; 3	SPA; 3	FRA; 4	QAT; 3		3rd	158
2016	MV Agusta	AUS; Ret	THA; 8	SPA; Ret	NED; 29	ITA; DSQ	MAL; 13	GBR; 10	ITA; 5	GER; 7	FRA; 9	SPA; 10	QAT; Ret		13th	50
2017	MV Agusta	AUS	THA	SPA	NED	ITA	GBR	ITA	GER; 6	POR; 8	FRA; 6	SPA; 17	QAT; 11		16th	33

=== MotoAmerica SuperBike Championship ===
==== Results ====
Year	Class	Team	1		2		3		4		5		6		7		8			9			Pos	Pts
Year	Class	Team	R1	R2	R1	R2	R1	R2	R1	R2	R1	R2	R1	R2	R1	R2	R1	R2	R3	R1	R2	R3	Pos	Pts
2020	SuperBike	Ducati	RAM	RAM	RAM	RAM	ATL	ATL	PIT	PIT	TRD; 7	TRD; Ret	NJR	NJR	ALA	ALA	BRI; 3	BRI; 1	BRI; 3	LGS; 3	LGS; 2	LGS; 3	9th	118

=== CIV National Superbike ===
==== Races by year ====
(key) (Races in bold indicate pole position; races in italics indicate fastest lap)

Year	Bike	1		2		3		4		5		6		Pos	Pts
Year	Bike	R1	R2	R1	R2	R1	R2	R1	R2	R1	R2	R1	R2	Pos	Pts
2022	Ducati	MIS; 2	MIS; DNQ	VAL	VAL	MUG	MUG	MIS2; 4	MIS2; 7	MUG2	MUG2	IMO; Ret	IMO; 1	10th	67

=== CIV Championship (Campionato Italiano Velocita) ===
==== Races by year ====
(key) (Races in bold indicate pole position; races in italics indicate fastest lap)

Year	Class	Bike	1	2	3	4	5	6	7	8	9	10	11	12	Pos	Pts
2002	125cc	Honda	IMO; 15	VAL; 22	MUG; 18	MIS1; 15	MIS2; Ret								30th	2
2003	125cc	Honda	MIS1; Ret	MUG1; 16	MIS1; 8	MUG2; 10	VAL; 6								9th	24
2004	125cc	Honda	MUG; 2	IMO; Ret	VAL1; Ret	MIS	VAL2								13th	20
2024	Superbike	Ducati	MIS1	MIS2	VAL1	VAL2	MUG1	MUG2	MIS3	MIS4	MUG3	MUG4	IMO1; 4	IMO2; 1	13th	38
