= 2023 German motorcycle Grand Prix =

Motorcycle races in Hohenstein-Ernstthal

(Germany) 2023 German Grand Prix
Race details
- Race 7 of 20 races in the 2023 Grand Prix motorcycle racing season
- Date: 17–18 June 2023
- Official name: Liqui Moly Motorrad Grand Prix Deutschland
- Location: Sachsenring; Hohenstein-Ernstthal, Germany
- Course: Permanent racing facility; 3.671 km (2.281 mi)

MotoGP
Pole position
Rider	(Italy) Francesco Bagnaia	Ducati
Time	1:21.409	
Fastest lap
Rider	(France) Johann Zarco	Ducati
Time	1:21.225 on lap 8	
Podium
First	(Spain) Jorge Martín	Ducati
Second	(Italy) Francesco Bagnaia	Ducati
Third	(France) Johann Zarco	Ducati

Moto2
Pole position
Rider	(Spain) Pedro Acosta	Kalex
Time	1:23.858	
Fastest lap
Rider	(Spain) Pedro Acosta	Kalex
Time	1:23.673 on lap 3	
Podium
First	(Spain) Pedro Acosta	Kalex
Second	(Italy) Tony Arbolino	Kalex
Third	(United Kingdom) Jake Dixon	Kalex

Moto3
Pole position
Rider	(Japan) Ayumu Sasaki	Husqvarna
Time	1:25.130	
Fastest lap
Rider	(Spain) Daniel Holgado	KTM
Time	1:25.694 on lap 3	
Podium
First	(Turkey) Deniz Öncü	KTM
Second	(Japan) Ayumu Sasaki	Husqvarna
Third	(Spain) Daniel Holgado	KTM

MotoE Race 1
Pole position
Rider	(Spain) Jordi Torres	Ducati
Time	1:34.601	
Fastest lap
Rider	(Spain) Héctor Garzó	Ducati
Time	1:27.914 on lap 2	
Podium
First	(Spain) Jordi Torres	Ducati
Second	(Switzerland) Randy Krummenacher	Ducati
Third	(Italy) Nicholas Spinelli	Ducati

MotoE Race 2
Pole position
Rider	(Spain) Jordi Torres	Ducati
Time	1:34.601	
Fastest lap
Rider	(Switzerland) Randy Krummenacher	Ducati
Time	1:27.545 on lap 2	
Podium
First	(Spain) Héctor Garzó	Ducati
Second	(Italy) Mattia Casadei	Ducati
Third	(Spain) Jordi Torres	Ducati

The 2023 German motorcycle Grand Prix (officially known as the Liqui Moly Motorrad Grand Prix Deutschland) was the seventh round of the 2023 Grand Prix motorcycle racing season and the third round of the 2023 MotoE World Championship. All races (except for both MotoE races which were held on 17 June) were held at the Sachsenring in Hohenstein-Ernstthal on 18 June 2023.

== Qualifying ==
=== MotoGP ===
Fastest session lap

Pos.	No.	Biker	Constructor	Qualifying times		Final grid	Row
Pos.	No.	Biker	Constructor	Q1	Q2	Final grid	Row
1	1	(Italy) Francesco Bagnaia	Ducati	Qualified in Q2	1'21.409	1	1
2	10	(Italy) Luca Marini	Ducati	Qualified in Q2	1'21.487	2	1
3	43	(Australia) Jack Miller	KTM	Qualified in Q2	1'21.492	3	1
4	5	(France) Johann Zarco	Ducati	Qualified in Q2	1'21.765	4	2
5	72	(Italy) Marco Bezzecchi	Ducati	Qualified in Q2	1'21.936	5	2
6	89	(Spain) Jorge Martín	Ducati	Qualified in Q2	1'21.995	6	2
7	93	(Spain) Marc Márquez	Honda	1'25.681	1'22.013	7	3
8	73	(Spain) Álex Márquez	Ducati	Qualified in Q2	1'22.044	8	3
9	33	(South Africa) Brad Binder	KTM	1'24.655	1'22.047	9	3
10	41	(Spain) Aleix Espargaró	Aprilia	Qualified in Q2	1'22.222	10	4
11	23	(Italy) Enea Bastianini	Ducati	Qualified in Q2	1'22.239	11	4
12	20	(France) Fabio Quartararo	Yamaha	Qualified in Q2	1'22.421	12	4
13	12	(Spain) Maverick Viñales	Aprilia	1'27.269	N/A	13	5
14	49	(Italy) Fabio Di Giannantonio	Ducati	1'27.692	N/A	14	5
15	37	(Spain) Augusto Fernández	KTM	1'27.734	N/A	15	5
16	88	(Portugal) Miguel Oliveira	Aprilia	1'27.882	N/A	16	6
17	21	(Italy) Franco Morbidelli	Yamaha	1'27.908	N/A	17	6
18	30	(Japan) Takaaki Nakagami	Honda	1'28.404	N/A	18	6
19	25	(Spain) Raúl Fernández	Aprilia	1'29.119	N/A	19	7
20	94	(Germany) Jonas Folger	KTM	1'29.712	N/A	20	7
OFFICIAL MOTOGP QUALIFYING RESULTS

== MotoGP Sprint ==
The MotoGP Sprint was held on 17 June.

Pos.	No.	Rider	Team	Constructor	Laps	Time/Retired	Grid	Points
1	89	(Spain) Jorge Martín	Prima Pramac Racing	Ducati	15	20:21.871	6	12
2	1	(Italy) Francesco Bagnaia	Ducati Lenovo Team	Ducati	15	+2.468	1	9
3	43	(Australia) Jack Miller	Red Bull KTM Factory Racing	KTM	15	+3.287	3	7
4	10	(Italy) Luca Marini	Mooney VR46 Racing Team	Ducati	15	+5.487	2	6
5	5	(France) Johann Zarco	Prima Pramac Racing	Ducati	15	+5.538	4	5
6	33	(South Africa) Brad Binder	Red Bull KTM Factory Racing	KTM	15	+6.289	9	4
7	72	(Italy) Marco Bezzecchi	Mooney VR46 Racing Team	Ducati	15	+6.956	5	3
8	73	(Spain) Álex Márquez	Gresini Racing MotoGP	Ducati	15	+9.261	8	2
9	41	(Spain) Aleix Espargaró	Aprilia Racing	Aprilia	15	+9.691	10	1
10	23	(Italy) Enea Bastianini	Ducati Lenovo Team	Ducati	15	+9.715	11	
11	93	(Spain) Marc Márquez	Repsol Honda Team	Honda	15	+10.828	7	
12	49	(Italy) Fabio Di Giannantonio	Gresini Racing MotoGP	Ducati	15	+10.905	14	
13	20	(France) Fabio Quartararo	Monster Energy Yamaha MotoGP	Yamaha	15	+11.366	12	
14	37	(Spain) Augusto Fernández	GasGas Factory Racing Tech3	KTM	15	+12.593	15	
15	21	(Italy) Franco Morbidelli	Monster Energy Yamaha MotoGP	Yamaha	15	+12.905	17	
16	88	(Portugal) Miguel Oliveira	CryptoData RNF MotoGP Team	Aprilia	15	+13.837	16	
17	30	(Japan) Takaaki Nakagami	LCR Honda Idemitsu	Honda	15	+14.505	18	
18	25	(Spain) Raúl Fernández	CryptoData RNF MotoGP Team	Aprilia	15	+28.959	19	
Ret	12	(Spain) Maverick Viñales	Aprilia Racing	Aprilia	11	Accident	13	
Ret	94	(Germany) Jonas Folger	GasGas Factory Racing Tech3	KTM	6	Retired	20	
Fastest sprint lap: (Spain) Jorge Martín (Ducati) – 1:20.886 (lap 7)
OFFICIAL MOTOGP SPRINT REPORT

== Race ==
=== MotoGP ===
Pos.	No.	Rider	Team	Constructor	Laps	Time/Retired	Grid	Points
1	89	(Spain) Jorge Martín	Prima Pramac Racing	Ducati	30	40:52.449	6	25
2	1	(Italy) Francesco Bagnaia	Ducati Lenovo Team	Ducati	30	+0.064	1	20
3	5	(France) Johann Zarco	Prima Pramac Racing	Ducati	30	+7.013	4	16
4	72	(Italy) Marco Bezzecchi	Mooney VR46 Racing Team	Ducati	30	+8.430	5	13
5	10	(Italy) Luca Marini	Mooney VR46 Racing Team	Ducati	30	+11.679	2	11
6	43	(Australia) Jack Miller	Red Bull KTM Factory Racing	KTM	30	+11.904	3	10
7	73	(Spain) Álex Márquez	Gresini Racing MotoGP	Ducati	30	+14.040	7	9
8	23	(Italy) Enea Bastianini	Ducati Lenovo Team	Ducati	30	+14.859	10	8
9	49	(Italy) Fabio Di Giannantonio	Gresini Racing MotoGP	Ducati	30	+17.061	13	7
10	88	(Portugal) Miguel Oliveira	CryptoData RNF MotoGP Team	Aprilia	30	+19.648	15	6
11	37	(Spain) Augusto Fernández	GasGas Factory Racing Tech3	KTM	30	+19.997	14	5
12	21	(Italy) Franco Morbidelli	Monster Energy Yamaha MotoGP	Yamaha	30	+22.949	16	4
13	20	(France) Fabio Quartararo	Monster Energy Yamaha MotoGP	Yamaha	30	+25.117	11	3
14	30	(Japan) Takaaki Nakagami	LCR Honda Idemitsu	Honda	30	+25.327	17	2
15	25	(Spain) Raúl Fernández	CryptoData RNF MotoGP Team	Aprilia	30	+25.503	18	1
16	41	(Spain) Aleix Espargaró	Aprilia Racing	Aprilia	30	+28.543	9	
17	94	(Germany) Jonas Folger	GasGas Factory Racing Tech3	KTM	30	+48.962	19	
Ret	33	(South Africa) Brad Binder	Red Bull KTM Factory Racing	KTM	18	Accident	8	
Ret	12	(Spain) Maverick Viñales	Aprilia Racing	Aprilia	8	Engine	12	
DNS	93	(Spain) Marc Márquez	Repsol Honda Team	Honda		Did not start		
Fastest lap: (France) Johann Zarco (Ducati) – 1:21.225 (lap 8)
OFFICIAL MOTOGP RACE REPORT

- Marc Márquez suffered a left thumb fracture during the morning warm up session and withdrew from the main race.

=== Moto2 ===
Pos.	No.	Rider	Constructor	Laps	Time/Retired	Grid	Points
1	37	(Spain) Pedro Acosta	Kalex	25	35:15.315	1	25
2	14	(Italy) Tony Arbolino	Kalex	25	+2.730	2	20
3	96	(United Kingdom) Jake Dixon	Kalex	25	+2.825	3	16
4	35	(Thailand) Somkiat Chantra	Kalex	25	+9.013	7	13
5	21	(Spain) Alonso López	Boscoscuro	25	+12.274	5	11
6	18	(Spain) Manuel González	Kalex	25	+13.540	12	10
7	22	(United Kingdom) Sam Lowes	Kalex	25	+14.457	6	9
8	54	(Spain) Fermín Aldeguer	Boscoscuro	25	+15.053	8	8
9	75	(Spain) Albert Arenas	Kalex	25	+15.219	9	7
10	13	(Italy) Celestino Vietti	Kalex	25	+15.397	11	6
11	11	(Spain) Sergio García	Kalex	25	+22.204	10	5
12	7	(Belgium) Barry Baltus	Kalex	25	+23.478	14	4
13	12	(Czech Republic) Filip Salač	Kalex	25	+23.586	13	3
14	79	(Japan) Ai Ogura	Kalex	25	+23.879	20	2
15	71	(Italy) Dennis Foggia	Kalex	25	+24.947	22	1
16	52	(Spain) Jeremy Alcoba	Kalex	25	+28.448	17	
17	4	(United States) Sean Dylan Kelly	Kalex	25	+32.574	18	
18	84	(Netherlands) Zonta van den Goorbergh	Kalex	25	+35.241	23	
19	99	(Spain) Carlos Tatay	Kalex	25	+36.630	26	
20	24	(Spain) Marcos Ramírez	Forward	25	+48.790	24	
21	23	(Japan) Taiga Hada	Kalex	25	+1:11.766	29	
22	27	(Malaysia) Kasma Daniel	Kalex	25	+1:23.431	28	
Ret	16	(United States) Joe Roberts	Kalex	18	Accident	16	
Ret	19	(Italy) Lorenzo Dalla Porta	Kalex	11	Retired	25	
Ret	28	(Spain) Izan Guevara	Kalex	8	Accident	27	
Ret	40	(Spain) Arón Canet	Kalex	5	Accident	4	
Ret	3	(Germany) Lukas Tulovic	Kalex	4	Accident	21	
Ret	64	(Netherlands) Bo Bendsneyder	Kalex	0	Accident	15	
Ret	15	(South Africa) Darryn Binder	Kalex	0	Accident	19	
DNS	72	(Spain) Borja Gómez	Kalex		Did not start		
Fastest lap: (Spain) Pedro Acosta (Kalex) – 1:23.673 (lap 3)
OFFICIAL MOTO2 RACE REPORT

- Borja Gómez was declared unfit to race after a crash in P2.

=== Moto3 ===
Pos.	No.	Rider	Constructor	Laps	Time/Retired	Grid	Points
1	53	(Turkey) Deniz Öncü	KTM	23	33:10.531	2	25
2	71	(Japan) Ayumu Sasaki	Husqvarna	23	+0.095	1	20
3	96	(Spain) Daniel Holgado	KTM	23	+12.074	6	16
4	48	(Spain) Iván Ortolá	KTM	23	+12.196	3	13
5	80	(Colombia) David Alonso	Gas Gas	23	+17.158	14	11
6	5	(Spain) Jaume Masià	Honda	23	+17.328	5	10
7	10	(Brazil) Diogo Moreira	KTM	23	+17.416	8	9
8	6	(Japan) Ryusei Yamanaka	Gas Gas	23	+17.468	15	8
9	82	(Italy) Stefano Nepa	KTM	23	+17.548	9	7
10	72	(Japan) Taiyo Furusato	Honda	23	+18.132	10	6
11 (Note: 1-position penalty for exceeding track limits)	43	(Spain) Xavier Artigas	CFMoto	23	+17.838	11	5
12	44	(Spain) David Muñoz	KTM	23	+20.723	29 (Note: Back of the grid start penalty)	4
13	99	(Spain) José Antonio Rueda	KTM	23	+21.034	16	3
14	27	(Japan) Kaito Toba	Honda	23	+21.147	7	2
15	16	(Italy) Andrea Migno	KTM	23	+21.241	13	1
16	31	(Spain) Adrián Fernández	Honda	23	+33.445	23	
17	54	(Italy) Riccardo Rossi	Honda	23	+33.536	21	
18	55	(Italy) Romano Fenati	Honda	23	+33.661	22	
19	64	(Indonesia) Mario Aji	Honda	23	+33.759	19	
20	19	(United Kingdom) Scott Ogden	Honda	23	+36.144	27	
21	7	(Italy) Filippo Farioli	KTM	23	+43.725	17	
22	66	(Australia) Joel Kelso	CFMoto	23	+45.306	18	
23	70	(United Kingdom) Joshua Whatley	Honda	23	+55.584	24	
24	38	(Spain) David Salvador	KTM	23	+55.605	28	
25	33	(Thailand) Tatchakorn Buasri	Honda	23	+55.729	25	
26	57	(Malaysia) Danial Shahril	KTM	23	+55.801	26	
27	22	(Spain) Ana Carrasco	KTM	23	+55.954	20	
Ret	18	(Italy) Matteo Bertelle	Honda	21	Accident	12	
Ret	95	(Netherlands) Collin Veijer	Husqvarna	1	Accident	4	
Fastest lap: (Spain) Daniel Holgado (KTM) – 1:25.694 (lap 3)
OFFICIAL MOTO3 RACE REPORT

=== MotoE ===
==== Race 1 ====
Pos.	No.	Rider	Laps	Time/Retired	Grid	Points
1	81	(Spain) Jordi Torres	10	14:46.636	1	25
2	3	(Switzerland) Randy Krummenacher	10	+0.778	7	20
3	29	(Italy) Nicholas Spinelli	10	+0.962	4	16
4	11	(Italy) Matteo Ferrari	10	+1.014	10 (Note: 1-place grid penalty)	13
5	61	(Italy) Alessandro Zaccone	10	+1.370	8	11
6	40	(Italy) Mattia Casadei	10	+3.550	6	10
7	53	(Spain) Tito Rabat	10	+4.772	9	9
8	77	(Spain) Miquel Pons	10	+4.850	11	8
9	9	(Italy) Andrea Mantovani	10	+5.282	12	7
10	78	(Japan) Hikari Okubo	10	+6.481	5	6
11	21	(Italy) Kevin Zannoni	10	+7.318	15	5
12	34	(Italy) Kevin Manfredi	10	+7.949	13	4
13	8	(Spain) Mika Pérez	10	+13.567	14	3
14	72	(Italy) Alessio Finello	10	+18.576	16	2
15	6	(Spain) María Herrera	10	+18.761	17	1
16	23	(Italy) Luca Salvadori	10	+21.661	18	
Ret	51	(Brazil) Eric Granado	9	Accident	3	
Ret	4	(Spain) Héctor Garzó	9	Accident	2	
Fastest lap: (Spain) Héctor Garzó – 1:27.914 (lap 2)
OFFICIAL MOTOE RACE NR.1 REPORT

- All bikes manufactured by Ducati.

==== Race 2 ====
The race, scheduled to be run for ten laps, was red-flagged after six laps due to weather conditions. The race was deemed as completed and was not restarted.

Pos.	No.	Rider	Laps	Time/Retired	Grid	Points
1	4	(Spain) Héctor Garzó	6	8:50.507	2	25
2	40	(Italy) Mattia Casadei	6	+0.233	6	20
3	81	(Spain) Jordi Torres	6	+0.290	1	16
4	51	(Brazil) Eric Granado	6	+0.577	3	13
5	29	(Italy) Nicholas Spinelli	6	+0.779	4	11
6	3	(Switzerland) Randy Krummenacher	6	+0.802	7	10
7	11	(Italy) Matteo Ferrari	6	+0.857	10	9
8	78	(Japan) Hikari Okubo	6	+2.650	5	8
9	61	(Italy) Alessandro Zaccone	6	+2.657	8	7
10	9	(Italy) Andrea Mantovani	6	+2.770	12	6
11	77	(Spain) Miquel Pons	6	+2.880	11	5
12	21	(Italy) Kevin Zannoni	6	+5.312	15	4
13	34	(Italy) Kevin Manfredi	6	+5.886	13	3
14	53	(Spain) Tito Rabat	6	+6.155	9	2
15	8	(Spain) Mika Pérez	6	+8.396	14	1
16	23	(Italy) Luca Salvadori	6	+13.836	18	
17	72	(Italy) Alessio Finello	6	+14.481	16	
18	6	(Spain) María Herrera	6	+19.828	17	
Fastest lap: (Switzerland) Randy Krummenacher – 1:27.545 (lap 2)
OFFICIAL MOTOE RACE NR.2 REPORT

- All bikes manufactured by Ducati.

== Championship standings after the race ==
Below are the standings for the top five riders, constructors, and teams after the round.

=== MotoGP ===
Riders' Championship standings

	Pos.	Rider	Points
	1	(Italy) Francesco Bagnaia	160
1	2	(Spain) Jorge Martín	144
1	3	(Italy) Marco Bezzecchi	126
1	4	(France) Johann Zarco	109
1	5	(South Africa) Brad Binder	96

Constructors' Championship standings

Pos.	Constructor	Points
1	(Italy) Ducati	248
2	(Austria) KTM	135
3	(Italy) Aprilia	99
4	(Japan) Honda	81
5	(Japan) Yamaha	68

Teams' Championship standings

	Pos.	Team	Points
	1	(Italy) Prima Pramac Racing	253
	2	(Italy) Mooney VR46 Racing Team	215
1	3	(Italy) Ducati Lenovo Team	186
1	4	(Austria) Red Bull KTM Factory Racing	175
	5	(Italy) Aprilia Racing	108

=== Moto2 ===
Riders' Championship standings

	Pos.	Rider	Points
	1	(Italy) Tony Arbolino	139
	2	(Spain) Pedro Acosta	124
	3	(Spain) Alonso López	82
2	4	(United Kingdom) Jake Dixon	79
1	5	(Czech Republic) Filip Salač	72

Constructors' Championship standings

Pos.	Constructor	Points
1	(Germany) Kalex	175
2	(Italy) Boscoscuro	86

Teams' Championship standings

Pos.	Team	Points
1	(Belgium) Elf Marc VDS Racing Team	192
2	(Finland) Red Bull KTM Ajo	158
3	(Italy) MB Conveyors Speed Up	118
4	(Spain) Pons Wegow Los40	99
5	(Italy) QJmotor Gresini Moto2	94

=== Moto3 ===
Riders' Championship standings

	Pos.	Rider	Points
	1	(Spain) Daniel Holgado	125
	2	(Spain) Jaume Masià	84
	3	(Spain) Iván Ortolá	81
1	4	(Japan) Ayumu Sasaki	79
1	5	(Turkey) Deniz Öncü	78

Constructors' Championship standings

Pos.	Constructor	Points
1	(Austria) KTM	170
2	(Japan) Honda	109
3	(Sweden) Husqvarna	82
4	(Spain) Gas Gas	70
5	(China) CFMoto	55

Teams' Championship standings

	Pos.	Team	Points
1	1	(France) Red Bull KTM Tech3	127
1	2	(Luxembourg) Leopard Racing	122
	3	(Italy) Angeluss MTA Team	121
	4	(Finland) Red Bull KTM Ajo	120
	5	(Germany) Liqui Moly Husqvarna Intact GP	97

=== MotoE ===
Riders' Championship standings

	Pos.	Rider	Points
	1	(Spain) Jordi Torres	104
	2	(Italy) Matteo Ferrari	86
	3	(Spain) Héctor Garzó	84
	4	(Switzerland) Randy Krummenacher	75
4	5	(Italy) Mattia Casadei	60

Teams' Championship standings

	Pos.	Team	Points
	1	(Germany) Dynavolt Intact GP MotoE	159
2	2	(Spain) Openbank Aspar Team	112
2	3	(Spain) HP Pons Los40	105
2	4	(Italy) Felo Gresini MotoE	102
2	5	(Italy) Ongetta Sic58 Squadracorse	89

== Notes ==
Previous race: 2023 Italian Grand Prix	FIM Grand Prix World Championship; 2023 season	Next race: 2023 Dutch TT
Previous race: 2022 German Grand Prix	German motorcycle Grand Prix	Next race: 2024 German Grand Prix
