= 2023 CIV Superbike Championship =

Motorcycle race season

2023 CIV Superbike Championship
Previous:	2022	Next:	2024
Support series: 2023 CIV Supersport 600 Championship; 2023 CIV Supersport 300 Championship; 2023 CIV Moto3 Championship

The 2023 campionato italiano velocità season is the 22nd season of the CIV Superbike Championship. The season was contested over 6 rounds with 2 races per event, starting at Misano on 29 April and finished at Imola on 8 October.

Lorenzo Zanetti won the title after beating closest rival Michele Pirro.

== Race calendar and results ==
2023 Calendar
Round		Circuit	Date	Pole position	Fastest lap	Race winner	Winning team	Winning constructor	Ref
1	R1	Misano 1	29 April	(Italy) Samuele Cavalieri	(Italy) Lorenzo Zanetti	(Italy) Lorenzo Zanetti	(Italy) Broncos Racing Team	(Italy) Ducati	
1	R2	Misano 1	30 April	(Italy) Samuele Cavalieri	(Italy) Michele Pirro	(Italy) Michele Pirro	(Italy) Barni Spark Racing Team	(Italy) Ducati	
2	R1	Mugello 1	13 May	(Italy) Michele Pirro	(Italy) Michele Pirro	(Italy) Michele Pirro	(Italy) Barni Spark Racing Team	(Italy) Ducati	
2	R2	Mugello 1	14 May	(Italy) Michele Pirro	(Italy) Lorenzo Zanetti	(Italy) Michele Pirro	(Italy) Barni Spark Racing Team	(Italy) Ducati	
3	R1	Vallelunga	17 June	(Italy) Michele Pirro	(Italy) Michele Pirro	(Italy) Michele Pirro	(Italy) Barni Spark Racing Team	(Italy) Ducati	
3	R2	Vallelunga	18 June	(Italy) Michele Pirro	(Italy) Michele Pirro	(San Marino) Luca Bernardi	(Italy) Nuova M2 Racing	(Italy) Aprilia	
4	R1	Misano 2	29 July	(Italy) Michele Pirro	(Italy) Michele Pirro	(Italy) Michele Pirro	(Italy) Barni Spark Racing Team	(Italy) Ducati	
4	R2	Misano 2	30 July	(Italy) Michele Pirro	(San Marino) Luca Bernardi	(San Marino) Luca Bernardi	(Italy) Nuova M2 Racing	(Italy) Aprilia	
5	R1	Mugello 2	2 September	(Italy) Michele Pirro	(Italy) Michele Pirro	(Italy) Michele Pirro	(Italy) Barni Spark Racing Team	(Italy) Ducati	
5	R2	Mugello 2	3 September	(Italy) Michele Pirro	(Italy) Roberto Tamburini	(Italy) Michele Pirro	(Italy) Barni Spark Racing Team	(Italy) Ducati	
6	R1	Imola	7 October	(Italy) Alessandro Delbianco	(Italy) Michele Pirro	(Italy) Lorenzo Zanetti	(Italy) Broncos Racing Team	(Italy) Ducati	
6	R2	Imola	8 October	(Italy) Alessandro Delbianco	(Italy) Michele Pirro	(Italy) Alessandro Delbianco	(Italy) Keope Motor Team	(Japan) Yamaha	

== Entry list ==
EntryList
Team	Constructor	Motorcycle	No.	Rider	Rounds
(Italy) Nuova M2 Racing	Aprilia	Aprilia RSV4 RF	19	(San Marino) Luca Bernardi	All
(Italy) Nuova M2 Racing	Aprilia	Aprilia RSV4 RF	76	(Italy) Samuele Cavalieri	All
(Italy) Nuova M2 Racing	Aprilia	Aprilia RSV4 RF	81	(Italy) Alex Bernardi	1, 3–6
(Italy) 322 Racing Service	BMW	S1000RR	322	(Italy) Jarno Ioverno	4
(Italy) Bike E Motor Racing Team	BMW	S1000RR	90	(Italy) Daniele Zinni	All
(Italy) Barni Spark Racing Team	Ducati	Panigale V4 R	1	(Italy) Michele Pirro	All
(Italy) Barni Spark Racing Team	Ducati	Panigale V4 R	30	(Italy) Alberto Butti	All
(Italy) Broncos Racing Team	Ducati	Panigale V4 R	87	(Italy) Lorenzo Zanetti	All
(Italy) Boccetti Racing	Honda	CBR1000RR	97	(Italy) Cristian Redaelli	1, 3–6
(Italy) DMR Racing	Honda	CBR1000RR	10	(Italy) Agostino Santoro	1–2
(Italy) DMR Racing	Honda	CBR1000RR	53	(Italy) Gianluca Sconza	5–6
(Italy) DMR Racing	Honda	CBR1000RR	72	(Italy) Alessio Finello	4–5
(Italy) DMR Racing	Honda	CBR1000RR	84	(Italy) Riccardo Russo	All
(Italy) Scuderia Improve - Firenze Motor	Honda	CBR1000RR	70	(Italy) Luca Vitali	All
(Italy) TCF Racing Team	Honda	CBR1000RR	73	(Italy) Simone Saltarelli	All
(Italy) The Black Sheep Team	Honda	CBR1000RR	12	(Italy) Nicola Chiarini	1–2
(Italy) The Black Sheep Team	Honda	CBR1000RR	36	(Italy) Lorenzo Gabellini	4–6
(Italy) Penta Motorsport	Suzuki	GSX-R1000R	34	(Italy) Kevin Manfredi	1–2, 4, 6
(Italy) Faieta Motors by Speed Action	Yamaha	YZF-R1	33	(Italy) Flavio Ferroni	1–3
(Italy) Faieta Motors by Speed Action	Yamaha	YZF-R1	53	(Italy) Gianluca Sconza	1–3
(Italy) Keope Motor Team	Yamaha	YZF-R1	2	(Italy) Roberto Tamburini	5–6
(Italy) Keope Motor Team	Yamaha	YZF-R1	52	(Italy) Alessandro Delbianco	All

== Championship standings ==
=== Riders' standings ===
Position	1st	2nd	3rd	4th	5th	6th	7th	8th	9th	10th	11th	12th	13th	14th	15th
Points	25	20	16	13	11	10	9	8	7	6	5	4	3	2	1

Pos.	Rider	Bike	MIS 1		MUG 1		VAL		MIS 2		MUG 2		IMO		Pts.
1	(Italy) Lorenzo Zanetti	Ducati	1^{F}	3	3	2^{F}	2	2	3	3	3	3	1	Ret	206
2	(Italy) Michele Pirro	Ducati	7	1^{F}	1^{PF}	1^{P}	1^{PF}	Ret^{PF}	1^{PF}	10^{P}	1^{PF}	1^{P}	9^{F}	11^{F}	202
3	(San Marino) Luca Bernardi	Aprilia	13	4	6	3	7	1	2	1^{F}	5	5	4	2	176
4	(Italy) Alessandro Delbianco	Yamaha	10	13	2	Ret	5	Ret	4	4	2	4	2^{P}	1^{P}	144
5	(Italy) Luca Vitali	Honda	4	2	7	4	Ret	Ret	5	2	10	6	5	4	126
6	(Italy) Simone Saltarelli	Honda	3	6	DNS	11	6	3	7	9	7	9	8	5	108
7	(Italy) Riccardo Russo	Honda	14	7	4	5	3	Ret	6	7	8	8	Ret	7	95
8	(Italy) Samuele Cavalieri	Aprilia	8^{P}	Ret^{P}	11	7	4	Ret	8	5	6	7	3	Ret	89
9	(Italy) Alberto Butti	Ducati	9	10	10	6	Ret	5	11	13	11	10	10	9	72
10	(Italy) Daniele Zinni	BMW	16	11	8	9	9	6	10	12	13	12	11	8	67
11	(Italy) Gianluca Sconza	Yamaha	11	12	9	10	8	4							60
11	(Italy) Gianluca Sconza	Honda									12	13	12	10	60
12	(Italy) Kevin Manfredi	Suzuki	2	5	WD	WD			Ret	6			6	Ret	51
13	(Italy) Flavio Ferroni	Yamaha	5	9	5	8	10	8							51
14	(Italy) Roberto Tamburini	Yamaha									4	2^{F}	Ret	3	49
15	(Italy) Lorenzo Gabellini	Honda							9	8	9	11	7	6	46
16	(Italy) Cristian Redaelli	Honda	DNS	DNS			11	7	Ret	14	14	14	WD	WD	20
17	(Italy) Nicola Chiarini	Honda	6	Ret	12	DNS									14
18	(Italy) Alex Bernardi	Aprilia	12	DNS			12	Ret	12	Ret	DNS	DNS	DNS	DNS	12
19	(Italy) Agostino Santoro	Honda	15	8	DNS	DNS									9
20	(Italy) Alessio Finello	Honda							13	11	WD	WD			8
Pos.	Rider	Bike	MIS 1		MUG 1		VAL		MIS 2		MUG 2		IMO		Pts.

Colour	Result
Gold	Winner
Silver	Second place
Bronze	Third place
Green	Points classification
Blue	Non-points classification
Blue	Non-classified finish (NC)
Purple	Retired, not classified (Ret)
Red	Did not qualify (DNQ)
Red	Did not pre-qualify (DNPQ)
Black	Disqualified (DSQ)
White	Did not start (DNS)
White	Withdrew (WD)
White	Race cancelled (C)
Blank	Did not practice (DNP)
Blank	Did not arrive (DNA)
Blank	Excluded (EX)

P – Pole position
F – Fastest lap
Source :
