= 2023 Dutch TT =

Motorcycle races in Assen

(Netherlands) 2023 Dutch TT
Race details
- Race 8 of 20 races in the 2023 Grand Prix motorcycle racing season
- Date: 24–25 June 2023
- Official name: Motul TT Assen
- Location: TT Circuit Assen; Assen, Netherlands
- Course: Permanent racing facility; 4.542 km (2.822 mi)

MotoGP
Pole position
Rider	(Italy) Marco Bezzecchi	Ducati
Time	1:31.472	
Fastest lap
Rider	(Spain) Jorge Martín	Ducati
Time	1:33.065 on lap 13	
Podium
First	(Italy) Francesco Bagnaia	Ducati
Second	(Italy) Marco Bezzecchi	Ducati
Third	(Spain) Aleix Espargaró	Aprilia

Moto2
Pole position
Rider	(Spain) Alonso López	Boscoscuro
Time	1:36.247	
Fastest lap
Rider	(United Kingdom) Jake Dixon	Kalex
Time	1:36.697 on lap 18	
Podium
First	(United Kingdom) Jake Dixon	Kalex
Second	(Japan) Ai Ogura	Kalex
Third	(Spain) Pedro Acosta	Kalex

Moto3
Pole position
Rider	(Spain) David Muñoz	KTM
Time	1:41.181	
Fastest lap
Rider	(Spain) Iván Ortolá	KTM
Time	1:41.752 on lap 8	
Podium
First	(Spain) Jaume Masià	Honda
Second	(Japan) Ayumu Sasaki	Husqvarna
Third	(Turkey) Deniz Öncü	KTM

MotoE Race 1
Pole position
Rider	(Spain) Jordi Torres (Note: Mattia Casadei, who initially set the fastest time during qualifying, was penalized for illegal tyre pressures during the second qualifying session. His lap time which led to him qualifying on pole was cancelled and he was also disqualified from Q2, leading him to start tenth on the grid. Jordi Torres, who initially finished second in Q2, was promoted to the pole position grid slot during the race and was also officially awarded the pole position statistic.)	Ducati
Time	1:40.743	
Fastest lap
Rider	(Spain) Jordi Torres	Ducati
Time	1:40.281 on lap 2	
Podium
First	(Italy) Matteo Ferrari	Ducati
Second	(Spain) Jordi Torres	Ducati
Third	(Switzerland) Randy Krummenacher	Ducati

MotoE Race 2
Pole position
Rider	(Spain) Jordi Torres	Ducati
Time	1:40.743	
Fastest lap
Rider	(Italy) Mattia Casadei	Ducati
Time	1:40.359 on lap 2	
Podium
First	(Italy) Matteo Ferrari	Ducati
Second	(Spain) Jordi Torres	Ducati
Third	(Italy) Mattia Casadei	Ducati

The 2023 Dutch TT (officially known as the Motul TT Assen) was the eighth round of the 2023 Grand Prix motorcycle racing season and the fourth round of the 2023 MotoE World Championship. All races (except for both MotoE races which were held on 24 June) were held at the TT Circuit Assen in Assen on 25 June 2023.

== Qualifying ==
=== MotoGP ===
Fastest session lap

Pos.	No.	Biker	Constructor	Qualifying times		Final grid	Row
Pos.	No.	Biker	Constructor	Q1	Q2	Final grid	Row
1	72	(Italy) Marco Bezzecchi	Ducati	Qualified in Q2	1'31.472	1	1
2	1	(Italy) Francesco Bagnaia	Ducati	Qualified in Q2	1'31.533	2	1
3	10	(Italy) Luca Marini	Ducati	Qualified in Q2	1'31.630	3	1
4	20	(France) Fabio Quartararo	Yamaha	Qualified in Q2	1'31.671	4	2
5	33	(South Africa) Brad Binder	KTM	Qualified in Q2	1'31.704	5	2
6	41	(Spain) Aleix Espargaró	Aprilia	Qualified in Q2	1'31.812	6	2
7	12	(Spain) Maverick Viñales	Aprilia	Qualified in Q2	1'31.837	7	3
8	5	(France) Johann Zarco	Ducati	1'31.993	1'31.881	8	3
9	73	(Spain) Álex Márquez	Ducati	Qualified in Q2	1'31.898	9	3
10	89	(Spain) Jorge Martín	Ducati	Qualified in Q2	1'32.170	10	4
11	88	(Portugal) Miguel Oliveira	Aprilia	1'32.087	1'32.174	11	4
12	43	(Australia) Jack Miller	KTM	Qualified in Q2	1'32.715	12	4
13	49	(Italy) Fabio Di Giannantonio	Ducati	1'32.185	N/A	13	5
14	30	(Japan) Takaaki Nakagami	Honda	1'32.497	N/A	14	5
15	21	(Italy) Franco Morbidelli	Yamaha	1'32.530	N/A	15	5
16	25	(Spain) Raúl Fernández	Aprilia	1'32.671	N/A	16	6
17	93	(Spain) Marc Márquez	Honda	1'32.672	N/A	17	6
18	23	(Italy) Enea Bastianini	Ducati	1'32.844	N/A	18	6
19	32	(Italy) Lorenzo Savadori	Aprilia	1'33.008	N/A	19	7
20	6	(Germany) Stefan Bradl	Honda	1'33.040	N/A	20	7
21	37	(Spain) Augusto Fernández	KTM	1'33.082	N/A	21	7
22	27	(Spain) Iker Lecuona	Honda	1'33.088	N/A	22	8
23	94	(Germany) Jonas Folger	KTM	1'33.300	N/A	23	8
OFFICIAL MOTOGP QUALIFYING RESULTS

== MotoGP Sprint ==
The MotoGP Sprint was held on 24 June.

Pos.	No.	Rider	Team	Constructor	Laps	Time/Retired	Grid	Points
1	72	(Italy) Marco Bezzecchi	Mooney VR46 Racing Team	Ducati	13	20:09.174	1	12
2	1	(Italy) Francesco Bagnaia	Ducati Lenovo Team	Ducati	13	+1.294	2	9
3	20	(France) Fabio Quartararo	Monster Energy Yamaha MotoGP	Yamaha	13	+1.872	4	7
4	41	(Spain) Aleix Espargaró	Aprilia Racing	Aprilia	13	+2.245	6	6
5	33	(South Africa) Brad Binder	Red Bull KTM Factory Racing	KTM	13	+4.582 (Note: Three-second penalty for exceeding track limits.)	5	5
6	89	(Spain) Jorge Martín	Prima Pramac Racing	Ducati	13	+5.036	10	4
7	12	(Spain) Maverick Viñales	Aprilia Racing	Aprilia	13	+5.876	7	3
8	23	(Italy) Enea Bastianini	Ducati Lenovo Team	Ducati	13	+10.102	18	2
9	73	(Spain) Álex Márquez	Gresini Racing MotoGP	Ducati	13	+10.525	9	1
10	10	(Italy) Luca Marini	Mooney VR46 Racing Team	Ducati	13	+10.556 (Note: 0.5-second penalty for making a shortcut at turn 17.)	3	
11	43	(Australia) Jack Miller	Red Bull KTM Factory Racing	KTM	13	+11.191	12	
12	30	(Japan) Takaaki Nakagami	LCR Honda Idemitsu	Honda	13	+11.473	14	
13	5	(France) Johann Zarco	Prima Pramac Racing	Ducati	13	+15.439	8	
14	37	(Spain) Augusto Fernández	GasGas Factory Racing Tech3	KTM	13	+17.754	21	
15	21	(Italy) Franco Morbidelli	Monster Energy Yamaha MotoGP	Yamaha	13	+19.508	15	
16	32	(Italy) Lorenzo Savadori	Aprilia Racing	Aprilia	13	+19.664	19	
17	93	(Spain) Marc Márquez	Repsol Honda Team	Honda	13	+19.916	17	
18	25	(Spain) Raúl Fernández	CryptoData RNF MotoGP Team	Aprilia	13	+20.583	16	
19	88	(Portugal) Miguel Oliveira	CryptoData RNF MotoGP Team	Aprilia	13	+24.269	11	
20	27	(Spain) Iker Lecuona	Repsol Honda Team	Honda	13	+24.727	22	
21	94	(Germany) Jonas Folger	GasGas Factory Racing Tech3	KTM	13	+32.056	23	
22	6	(Germany) Stefan Bradl	LCR Honda Castrol	Honda	13	+35.372	20	
Ret	49	(Italy) Fabio Di Giannantonio	Gresini Racing MotoGP	Ducati	3	Accident	13	
Fastest sprint lap: (Italy) Marco Bezzecchi (Ducati) – 1:32.353 (lap 3)
OFFICIAL MOTOGP SPRINT REPORT

== Race ==
=== MotoGP ===
Pos.	No.	Rider	Team	Constructor	Laps	Time/Retired	Grid	Points
1	1	(Italy) Francesco Bagnaia	Ducati Lenovo Team	Ducati	26	40:37.640	2	25
2	72	(Italy) Marco Bezzecchi	Mooney VR46 Racing Team	Ducati	26	+1.223	1	20
3	41	(Spain) Aleix Espargaró	Aprilia Racing	Aprilia	26	+1.925	6	16
4 (Note: One-position penalty for exceeding track limits on the last lap.)	33	(South Africa) Brad Binder	Red Bull KTM Factory Racing	KTM	26	+1.528	5	13
5	89	(Spain) Jorge Martín	Prima Pramac Racing	Ducati	26	+1.934	10	11
6	73	(Spain) Álex Márquez	Gresini Racing MotoGP	Ducati	26	+12.437	9	10
7	10	(Italy) Luca Marini	Mooney VR46 Racing Team	Ducati	26	+14.174	3	9
8	30	(Japan) Takaaki Nakagami	LCR Honda Idemitsu	Honda	26	+14.616	14	8
9	21	(Italy) Franco Morbidelli	Monster Energy Yamaha MotoGP	Yamaha	26	+29.335	15	7
10	37	(Spain) Augusto Fernández	GasGas Factory Racing Tech3	KTM	26	+33.736	20	6
11	32	(Italy) Lorenzo Savadori	Aprilia Racing	Aprilia	26	+35.084	18	5
12	25	(Spain) Raúl Fernández	CryptoData RNF MotoGP Team	Aprilia	26	+39.622	16	4
13	6	(Germany) Stefan Bradl	LCR Honda Castrol	Honda	26	+42.504	19	3
14	94	(Germany) Jonas Folger	GasGas Factory Racing Tech3	KTM	26	+45.609	22	2
Ret	49	(Italy) Fabio Di Giannantonio	Gresini Racing MotoGP	Ducati	18	Accident	13	
Ret	27	(Spain) Iker Lecuona	Repsol Honda Team	Honda	14	Mechanical	21	
Ret	88	(Portugal) Miguel Oliveira	CryptoData RNF MotoGP Team	Aprilia	12	Shoulder Pain	11	
Ret	23	(Italy) Enea Bastianini	Ducati Lenovo Team	Ducati	6	Accident	17	
Ret	12	(Spain) Maverick Viñales	Aprilia Racing	Aprilia	3	Accident	7	
Ret	20	(France) Fabio Quartararo	Monster Energy Yamaha MotoGP	Yamaha	2	Accident	4	
Ret	5	(France) Johann Zarco	Prima Pramac Racing	Ducati	2	Accident	8	
Ret	43	(Australia) Jack Miller	Red Bull KTM Factory Racing	KTM	1	Accident	12	
DNS	93	(Spain) Marc Márquez	Repsol Honda Team	Honda		Did not start		
Fastest lap: (Spain) Jorge Martín (Ducati) – 1:33.065 (lap 13)
OFFICIAL MOTOGP RACE REPORT

- Marc Márquez withdrew from the race due to a rib fracture.

=== Moto2 ===
Pos.	No.	Rider	Constructor	Laps	Time/Retired	Grid	Points
1	96	(United Kingdom) Jake Dixon	Kalex	22	35:43.411	2	25
2	79	(Japan) Ai Ogura	Kalex	22	+1.334	3	20
3	37	(Spain) Pedro Acosta	Kalex	22	+4.448	6	16
4	54	(Spain) Fermín Aldeguer	Boscoscuro	22	+4.487	4	13
5	40	(Spain) Arón Canet	Kalex	22	+4.884	11	11
6	21	(Spain) Alonso López	Boscoscuro	22	+9.555	1	10
7	14	(Italy) Tony Arbolino	Kalex	22	+9.625	10	9
8	18	(Spain) Manuel González	Kalex	22	+10.547	12	8
9	75	(Spain) Albert Arenas	Kalex	22	+10.615	8	7
10	13	(Italy) Celestino Vietti	Kalex	22	+10.761	9	6
11	22	(United Kingdom) Sam Lowes	Kalex	22	+15.964	5	5
12	7	(Belgium) Barry Baltus	Kalex	22	+18.234	16	4
13	11	(Spain) Sergio García	Kalex	22	+20.408	17	3
14	15	(South Africa) Darryn Binder	Kalex	22	+20.639	15	2
15	52	(Spain) Jeremy Alcoba	Kalex	22	+24.492 (Note: Three-second penalty for making a shortcut at turn 17.)	18	1
16	3	(Germany) Lukas Tulovic	Kalex	22	+29.416	19	
17	99	(Spain) Carlos Tatay	Kalex	22	+32.440	20	
18	16	(United States) Joe Roberts	Kalex	22	+35.017	14	
19	71	(Italy) Dennis Foggia	Kalex	22	+35.235	25	
20	84	(Netherlands) Zonta van den Goorbergh	Kalex	22	+50.394	22	
21	23	(Japan) Taiga Hada	Kalex	22	+1:09.768	27	
22	55	(Spain) Yeray Ruiz	Forward	19	+3 laps	26	
Ret	12	(Czech Republic) Filip Salač	Kalex	21	Mechanical	13	
Ret	72	(Spain) Borja Gómez	Kalex	18	Accident	23	
Ret	17	(Spain) Álex Escrig	Forward	17	Retired	28	
Ret	28	(Spain) Izan Guevara	Kalex	15	Accident	24 (Note: Three-place grid penalty for riding slow on the racing line during Practice 3.)	
Ret	4	(United States) Sean Dylan Kelly	Kalex	15	Arm Pump	21	
Ret	35	(Thailand) Somkiat Chantra	Kalex	9	Accident	7	
WD	24	(Spain) Marcos Ramírez	Forward		Withdrew		
WD	64	(Netherlands) Bo Bendsneyder	Kalex		Withdrew		
Fastest lap: (United Kingdom) Jake Dixon (Kalex) – 1:36.697 (lap 18)
OFFICIAL MOTO2 RACE REPORT

- Marcos Ramírez competed during Practice 1 but withdrew from the race and was replaced by Álex Escrig.
- Bo Bendsneyder withdrew right before Practice 1 after being declared unfit.

=== Moto3 ===
Pos.	No.	Rider	Constructor	Laps	Time/Retired	Grid	Points
1	5	(Spain) Jaume Masià	Honda	20	34:14.619	8	25
2	71	(Japan) Ayumu Sasaki	Husqvarna	20	+0.081	4	20
3	53	(Turkey) Deniz Öncü	KTM	20	+0.276	5	16
4	48	(Spain) Iván Ortolá	KTM	20	+0.324	20	13
5	44	(Spain) David Muñoz	KTM	20	+0.401	1	11
6	99	(Spain) José Antonio Rueda	KTM	20	+0.507	11	10
7	95	(Netherlands) Collin Veijer	Husqvarna	20	+0.819	9	9
8	55	(Italy) Romano Fenati	Honda	20	+1.056	10	8
9	66	(Australia) Joel Kelso	CFMoto	20	+1.341	2	7
10	82	(Italy) Stefano Nepa	KTM	20	+2.024	6	6
11	27	(Japan) Kaito Toba	Honda	20	+11.736	7	5
12	10	(Brazil) Diogo Moreira	KTM	20	+12.254	22	4
13	80	(Colombia) David Alonso	Gas Gas	20	+12.317	17	3
14	43	(Spain) Xavier Artigas	CFMoto	20	+12.592	19	2
15	6	(Japan) Ryusei Yamanaka	Gas Gas	20	+12.594	25	1
16	18	(Italy) Matteo Bertelle	Honda	20	+12.646	16	
17	72	(Japan) Taiyo Furusato	Honda	20	+12.898	18	
18	54	(Italy) Riccardo Rossi	Honda	20	+13.041	3	
19	16	(Italy) Andrea Migno	KTM	20	+13.100	12	
20	38	(Spain) David Salvador	KTM	20	+14.651	14	
21	7	(Italy) Filippo Farioli	KTM	20	+22.458	21	
22	19	(United Kingdom) Scott Ogden	Honda	20	+26.301	13	
23	64	(Indonesia) Mario Aji	Honda	20	+26.374	24	
24	22	(Spain) Ana Carrasco	KTM	20	+31.379	26	
25	96	(Spain) Daniel Holgado	KTM	20	+1.14.539	27	
Ret	31	(Spain) Adrián Fernández	Honda	4	Accident Damage	15	
Ret	70	(United Kingdom) Joshua Whatley	Honda	2	Accident	23	
DNS	63	(Malaysia) Syarifuddin Azman	KTM		Did not start		
Fastest lap: (Spain) Iván Ortolá (KTM) – 1:41.752 (lap 8)
OFFICIAL MOTO3 RACE REPORT

=== MotoE ===
==== Race 1 ====
Pos.	No.	Rider	Laps	Time/Retired	Grid	Points
1	11	(Italy) Matteo Ferrari	7	11:50.202	2	25
2	81	(Spain) Jordi Torres	7	+0.676	1	20
3	3	(Switzerland) Randy Krummenacher	7	+0.955	4	16
4	40	(Italy) Mattia Casadei	7	+2.230	10	13
5	9	(Italy) Andrea Mantovani	7	+2.330	5	11
6	51	(Brazil) Eric Granado	7	+3.068	3	10
7	4	(Spain) Héctor Garzó	7	+7.054	12	9
8	53	(Spain) Tito Rabat	7	+7.182	9	8
9	29	(Italy) Nicholas Spinelli	7	+7.190	11	7
10	21	(Italy) Kevin Zannoni	7	+7.232	8	6
11	77	(Spain) Miquel Pons	7	+7.345	7	5
12	61	(Italy) Alessandro Zaccone	7	+7.489	6	4
13	34	(Italy) Kevin Manfredi	7	+7.715	14	3
14	78	(Japan) Hikari Okubo	7	+8.195	13	2
15	72	(Italy) Alessio Finello	7	+14.156	16	1
16	23	(Italy) Luca Salvadori	7	+14.617	15	
17	8	(Spain) Mika Pérez	7	+18.514	17	
18	6	(Spain) María Herrera	7	+38.627	18	
Fastest lap: (Spain) Jordi Torres – 1:40.281 (lap 2)
OFFICIAL MOTOE RACE NR.1 REPORT

- All bikes manufactured by Ducati.

==== Race 2 ====
Pos.	No.	Rider	Laps	Time/Retired	Grid	Points
1	11	(Italy) Matteo Ferrari	7	11:51.376	2	25
2	81	(Spain) Jordi Torres	7	+0.078	1	20
3	40	(Italy) Mattia Casadei	7	+1.610	10	16
4	51	(Brazil) Eric Granado	7	+1.826	3	13
5	77	(Spain) Miquel Pons	7	+2.858	7	11
6	21	(Italy) Kevin Zannoni	7	+2.875	8	10
7	61	(Italy) Alessandro Zaccone	7	+3.898	6	9
8	29	(Italy) Nicholas Spinelli	7	+3.978	11	8
9	3	(Switzerland) Randy Krummenacher	7	+4.218	4	7
10	34	(Italy) Kevin Manfredi	7	+6.343	14	6
11	4	(Spain) Héctor Garzó	7	+6.502	12	5
12	78	(Japan) Hikari Okubo	7	+8.620	13	4
13	72	(Italy) Alessio Finello	7	+10.119	16	3
14	8	(Spain) Mika Pérez	7	+12.683	17	2
15	6	(Spain) María Herrera	7	+22.444	18	1
Ret	9	(Italy) Andrea Mantovani	6	Accident	5	
Ret	23	(Italy) Luca Salvadori	6	Retired	15	
Ret	53	(Spain) Tito Rabat	0	Accident	9	
Fastest lap: (Italy) Mattia Casadei – 1:40.359 (lap 2)
OFFICIAL MOTOE RACE NR.2 REPORT

- All bikes manufactured by Ducati.

== Championship standings after the race ==
Below are the standings for the top five riders, constructors, and teams after the round.

=== MotoGP ===
Riders' Championship standings

	Pos.	Rider	Points
	1	(Italy) Francesco Bagnaia	194
	2	(Spain) Jorge Martín	159
	3	(Italy) Marco Bezzecchi	158
1	4	(South Africa) Brad Binder	114
1	5	(France) Johann Zarco	109

Constructors' Championship standings

Pos.	Constructor	Points
1	(Italy) Ducati	285
2	(Austria) KTM	153
3	(Italy) Aprilia	121
4	(Japan) Honda	89
5	(Japan) Yamaha	82

Teams' Championship standings

Pos.	Team	Points
1	(Italy) Prima Pramac Racing	268
2	(Italy) Mooney VR46 Racing Team	256
3	(Italy) Ducati Lenovo Team	222
4	(Austria) Red Bull KTM Factory Racing	193
5	(Italy) Aprilia Racing	133

=== Moto2 ===
Riders' Championship standings

	Pos.	Rider	Points
	1	(Italy) Tony Arbolino	148
	2	(Spain) Pedro Acosta	140
1	3	(United Kingdom) Jake Dixon	104
1	4	(Spain) Alonso López	92
1	5	(Spain) Arón Canet	76

Constructors' Championship standings

Pos.	Constructor	Points
1	(Germany) Kalex	200
2	(Italy) Boscoscuro	99

Teams' Championship standings

	Pos.	Team	Points
	1	(Belgium) Elf Marc VDS Racing Team	206
	2	(Finland) Red Bull KTM Ajo	181
	3	(Italy) Beta Tools Speed Up	141
	4	(Spain) Pons Wegow Los40	113
1	5	(Spain) Inde GasGas Aspar Team	104

=== Moto3 ===
Riders' Championship standings

	Pos.	Rider	Points
	1	(Spain) Daniel Holgado	125
	2	(Spain) Jaume Masià	109
1	3	(Japan) Ayumu Sasaki	99
1	4	(Spain) Iván Ortolá	94
	5	(Turkey) Deniz Öncü	94

Constructors' Championship standings

Pos.	Constructor	Points
1	(Austria) KTM	186
2	(Japan) Honda	134
3	(Sweden) Husqvarna	102
4	(Spain) Gas Gas	73
5	(China) CFMoto	62

Teams' Championship standings

	Pos.	Team	Points
1	1	(Luxembourg) Leopard Racing	147
2	2	(Finland) Red Bull KTM Ajo	146
	3	(Italy) Angeluss MTA Team	140
3	4	(France) Red Bull KTM Tech3	127
	5	(Germany) Liqui Moly Husqvarna Intact GP	126

=== MotoE ===
Riders' Championship standings

Pos.	Rider	Points
1	(Spain) Jordi Torres	144
2	(Italy) Matteo Ferrari	136
3	(Spain) Héctor Garzó	98
4	(Switzerland) Randy Krummenacher	98
5	(Italy) Mattia Casadei	89

Teams' Championship standings

	Pos.	Team	Points
	1	(Germany) Dynavolt Intact GP MotoE	196
2	2	(Italy) Felo Gresini MotoE	156
1	3	(Spain) Openbank Aspar Team	153
1	4	(Spain) HP Pons Los40	149
	5	(Italy) Ongetta Sic58 Squadracorse	114

== Notes ==
Previous race: 2023 German Grand Prix	FIM Grand Prix World Championship; 2023 season	Next race: 2023 British Grand Prix
Previous race: 2022 Dutch TT	Dutch TT	Next race: 2024 Dutch TT
