= 2022 Austrian motorcycle Grand Prix =

Motorcycle race in Spielberg

(Austria) 2022 Austrian Grand Prix
Race details
- Race 13 of 20 races in the 2022 Grand Prix motorcycle racing season
- Date: 20–21 August 2022
- Official name: CryptoData Motorrad Grand Prix von Österreich
- Location: Red Bull Ring; Spielberg, Styria, Austria
- Course: Permanent racing facility; 4.348 km (2.702 mi)

MotoGP
Pole position
Rider	(Italy) Enea Bastianini	Ducati
Time	1:28.772	
Fastest lap
Rider	(Spain) Jorge Martín	Ducati
Time	1:29.854 on lap 8	
Podium
First	(Italy) Francesco Bagnaia	Ducati
Second	(France) Fabio Quartararo	Yamaha
Third	(Australia) Jack Miller	Ducati

Moto2
Pole position
Rider	(Japan) Ai Ogura	Kalex
Time	1:33.933	
Fastest lap
Rider	(Italy) Celestino Vietti	Kalex
Time	1:34.073 on lap 14	
Podium
First	(Japan) Ai Ogura	Kalex
Second	(Thailand) Somkiat Chantra	Kalex
Third	(United Kingdom) Jake Dixon	Kalex

Moto3
Pole position
Rider	(Spain) Daniel Holgado	KTM
Time	1:41.234	
Fastest lap
Rider	(Spain) David Muñoz	KTM
Time	1:40.910 on lap 23	
Podium
First	(Japan) Ayumu Sasaki	Husqvarna
Second	(Japan) Tatsuki Suzuki	Honda
Third	(Spain) David Muñoz	KTM

MotoE Race 1
Pole position
Rider	(Brazil) Eric Granado	Energica
Time	1:41.390	
Fastest lap
Rider	(Brazil) Eric Granado	Energica
Time	1:41.064 on lap 3	
Podium
First	(Brazil) Eric Granado	Energica
Second	(Switzerland) Dominique Aegerter	Energica
Third	(Spain) Miquel Pons	Energica

MotoE Race 2
Pole position
Rider	(Brazil) Eric Granado	Energica
Time	1:41.390	
Fastest lap
Rider	(Spain) Miquel Pons	Energica
Time	1:41.163 on lap 2	
Podium
First	(Brazil) Eric Granado	Energica
Second	(Spain) Miquel Pons	Energica
Third	(Switzerland) Dominique Aegerter	Energica

The 2022 Austrian motorcycle Grand Prix (officially known as the CryptoData Motorrad Grand Prix von Österreich) was the thirteenth round of the 2022 Grand Prix motorcycle racing season and the fifth round of the 2022 MotoE World Cup. All races (except MotoE race 1 which was held on 20 August) were held at the Red Bull Ring in Spielberg on 21 August 2022.

== Background ==
=== Track layout changes ===
The Grand Prix used a new layout of the Red Bull Ring, wherein a chicane was added to the previous fast slight-left hander of turn 2. This was done to improve the overall safety of the track by greatly minimizing the speed the riders carry into turn 3. The new variation to the circuit follows safety reviews into the high speed accident on lap 9 of the 2020 Austrian Grand Prix. The final configuration was chosen among 15 proposals, with the track being 30 meters longer than the previous configurations.

=== Riders' entries ===
In the MotoGP class, Stefan Bradl continues to replace Marc Márquez in the Repsol Honda Team, Lorenzo Savadori runs as a wildcard with Aprilia for the fourth time in this championship. In the Moto2 class Sam Lowes was forced to miss the Grand Prix due to the dislocation of his left shoulder, and later further checks also revealed a fracture in the upper part of the humerus. To replace him on the Kalex of the Elf Marc VDS Racing Team is the seventeen year old Australian Senna Agius. To replace Gabriel Rodrigo, the Pertamina Mandalika SAG Team has chosen to have the 23 year old Japanese Taiga Hada race on his Kalex from this race until the end of the season. Rory Skinner races for the second consecutive race as a wild card with the American Racing Kalex. In the Moto3 class, Joel Kelso returns to the CIP Green Power KTM, while Nicola Carraro continues to replace Matteo Bertelle on the QJmotor Avintia Racing Team KTM. In the MotoE class, Xavi Cardelús returns to the Avintia Esponsorama Racing's Energica after missing the two races in the Dutch TT.

=== MotoGP Championship standings before the race ===
After the British Grand Prix, Fabio Quartararo maintains the lead in the riders' standings with 180 points, plus 22 over Aleix Espargaró. Francesco Bagnaia (winner at Silverstone, 131 points) and Enea Bastianini (118 points), overtake Johann Zarco, now fifth with 114 points. In the constructors' classification, Ducati dominated with 271 points; followed by Yamaha (180 points), Aprilia (175 points), KTM (131 points), Suzuki (110 points) and Honda (88 points). In the team standings, there are only two distances between Aprilia Racing (first at 240 points) and Ducati Lenovo Team (second at 238 points), with the latter having overtaken Monster Energy Yamaha MotoGP, now third with 206 points. Prima Pramac Racing and Red Bull KTM Factory Racing are fourth and fifth with 195 and 179 points respectively.

=== Moto2 Championship standings before the race ===
The victory in the previous Grand Prix allowed Augusto Fernández to conquer the leadership of the riders' standings and he is at 171 points with a 13 point advantage over Ai Ogura and 15 points over Celestino Vietti, the previous leader; Arón Canet is fourth with 127 points, plus 19 over Tony Arbolino. The constructors' classification reads: Kalex 300 points, Boscoscuro (who at Silverstone with Alonso López climbed on the podium with his bike for the first time this season) 77 points, MV Agusta 5 points. In the team standings, Red Bull KTM Ajo leads with 246 points, with a lead of 16 points over Idemitsu Honda Team Asia, 49 over Flexbox HP40, 87 over Elf Marc VDS Racing Team and 90 over Mooney VR46 Racing Team.

=== Moto3 Championship standings before the race ===
The retirements of Sergio García and Izan Guevara, combined with his victory at Silverstone, allow Dennis Foggia to reduce the distance in the riders' standings; García is first at 182 points, with only three points ahead of Guevara, and 42 over Foggia. Jaume Masià and Deniz Öncü are fourth and fifth with 127 and 114 points respectively. In the constructors' classification, Gas Gas leads with 235 points, followed by Honda (206 points), KTM (194 points), Husqvarna (142 points) and CFMoto (101 points). The team classification sees Gaviota GasGas Aspar Team clearly in the lead with 361 points, plus 127 on Leopard Racing; third Red Bull KTM Ajo with 175 points, preceding Sterilgarda Husqvarna Max (146 points) and Red Bull KTM Tech3 (143 points).

=== MotoE Cup standings before the race ===
Dominique Aegerter leads the standings ahead of this Grand Prix with 158 points, with a lead of 31.5 points over Eric Granado, 45.5 over Matteo Ferrari, 60 over Mattia Casadei and 79 over Miquel Pons.

== Free practice ==
=== MotoGP ===
The first session, held in wet-dry conditions, saw Jack Miller as the fastest ahead of Johann Zarco and Joan Mir. In the second session, the roles are reversed between Zarco and Miller, with Jorge Martín third. The French driver confirms himself as the fastest also in the third session, ahead of his compatriot Fabio Quartararo and Miller.

==== Combinated Free Practice 1-2-3 ====
The top ten riders (written in bold) qualified in Q2.

Fastest session lap

Pos.	No.	Biker	Constructor	Free practice times		
Pos.	No.	Biker	Constructor	FP1	FP2	FP3
1	5	**(France) Johann Zarco**	**Ducati**	1:31:374	1:29.837	**1:28.964**
2	20	**(France) Fabio Quartararo**	**Yamaha**	1:31.773	1:29.877	**1:29.117**
3	43	**(Australia) Jack Miller**	**Ducati**	1:30.756	1:29.861	**1:29.280**
4	89	**(Spain) Jorge Martín**	**Ducati**	1:31.616	1:29.866	**1:29.324**
5	63	**(Italy) Francesco Bagnaia**	**Ducati**	1:32.513	1:29.997	**1:29.377**
6	23	**(Italy) Enea Bastianini**	**Ducati**	1:31.976	1:30.066	**1:29.457**
7	42	**(Spain) Álex Rins**	**Suzuki**	1:31.875	1:30.321	**1:29.473**
8	33	**(South Africa) Brad Binder**	**KTM**	1:31.913	1:30.128	**1:29.521**
9	12	**(Spain) Maverick Viñales**	**Aprilia**	1:32.074	1:30.113	**1:29.523**
10	36	**(Spain) Joan Mir**	**Suzuki**	1:31.576	1:30.455	**1:29.538**
11	41	(Spain) Aleix Espargaró	Aprilia	1:32.557	1:30.147	**1:29.540**
12	30	(Japan) Takaaki Nakagami	Honda	1:31.941	1:30.311	**1:29.585**
13	72	(Italy) Marco Bezzecchi	Ducati	1:32.321	1:30.066	**1:29.623**
14	49	(Italy) Fabio Di Giannantonio	Ducati	1:32.775	1:30.700	**1:29.641**
15	10	(Italy) Luca Marini	Ducati	1:32.998	1:30.030	**1:29.684**
16	44	(Spain) Pol Espargaró	Honda	1:32.905	1:30.364	**1:29.710**
17	21	(Italy) Franco Morbidelli	Yamaha	1:32.488	1:30.617	**1:29.755**
18	88	(Portugal) Miguel Oliveira	KTM	1:32.422	1:31.315	**1:29.821**
19	4	(Italy) Andrea Dovizioso	Yamaha	1:32.007	1:30.639	**1:29.845**
20	73	(Spain) Álex Márquez	Honda	1:32.437	1:30.509	**1:30.017**
21	6	(Germany) Stefan Bradl	Honda	1:32.748	1:31.182	**1:30.026**
22	40	(South Africa) Darryn Binder	Yamaha	1:35.072	1:31.575	**1:30.472**
23	87	(Australia) Remy Gardner	KTM	1:35.092	1:31.324	**1:30.554**
24	32	(Italy) Lorenzo Savadori	Aprilia	1:32.963	**1:30.874**	1:31.699
25	25	(Spain) Raúl Fernández	KTM	1:33.796	1:31.978	**1:31.204**
OFFICIAL MOTOGP COMBINED FREE PRACTICE TIMES REPORT

==== Free Practice 4 ====
Enea Bastianini finished at the top of the standings, followed by Luca Marini and Francesco Bagnaia.

=== MotoE ===
Mattia Casadei was the fastest in both free practice sessions. In the first, held in the wet, he preceded Niccolò Canepa and Eric Granado. In the second, in the dry, he is followed in the standings by Dominique Aegerter and Granado.

The top eight riders (written in bold) qualified in Q2.

Fastest session lap

Pos.	No.	Biker	Constructor	Free practice times	
Pos.	No.	Biker	Constructor	FP1	FP2
1	27	**(Italy) Mattia Casadei**	**Energica**	1:49.203	1:41.720
2	77	**(Switzerland) Dominique Aegerter**	**Energica**	1:51.486	1:42.060
3	51	**(Brazil) Eric Granado**	**Energica**	1:50.190	1:42.175
4	71	**(Spain) Miquel Pons**	**Energica**	1:50.636	1:42.322
5	7	**(Italy) Niccolò Canepa**	**Energica**	1:49.837	1:42.334
6	11	**(Italy) Matteo Ferrari**	**Energica**	1:50.286	1:42.396
7	4	**(Spain) Héctor Garzó**	**Energica**	1:50.935	1:42.631
8	17	**(Spain) Álex Escrig**	**Energica**	1:51.499	1:42.861
9	21	**(Italy)** Kevin Zannoni	Energica	1:53.999	1:43.005
10	18	**(Andorra)** Xavi Cardelús	Energica	1:53.249	1:43.064
11	78	(Japan) Hikari Okubo	Energica	1:52.313	1:43.075
12	40	(Spain) Jordi Torres	Energica	1:51.623	1:43.091
13	34	(Italy) Kevin Manfredi	Energica	1:50.792	1:43.336
14	12	(Spain) Xavi Forés	Energica	1:52.224	1:43.455
15	6	(Spain) María Herrera	Energica	1:55.106	1:43.460
16	38	(United Kingdom) Bradley Smith	Energica	1:52.142	1:43.544
17	70	(Spain) Marc Alcoba	Energica	1:56.877	1:44.949
NC	72	(Italy) Alessio Finello	Energica	**1:52.380**	
OFFICIAL MOTOE COMBINED FREE PRACTICE TIMES REPORT

== Qualifying ==
=== MotoGP ===
Fastest session lap

Pos.	No.	Biker	Constructor	Qualifying times		Final grid	Row
Pos.	No.	Biker	Constructor	Q1	Q2	Final grid	Row
1	23	(Italy) Enea Bastianini	Ducati	Qualified in Q2	1:28.772	1	1
2	63	(Italy) Francesco Bagnaia	Ducati	Qualified in Q2	1:28.796	2	1
3	43	(Australia) Jack Miller	Ducati	Qualified in Q2	1:28.881	3	1
4	89	(Spain) Jorge Martín	Ducati	Qualified in Q2	1:28.958	4	2
5	20	(France) Fabio Quartararo	Yamaha	Qualified in Q2	1:29.003	5	2
6	5	(France) Johann Zarco	Ducati	Qualified in Q2	1:29.046	6	2
7	12	(Spain) Maverick Viñales	Aprilia	Qualified in Q2	1:29.135	7	3
8	36	(Spain) Joan Mir	Suzuki	Qualified in Q2	1:29.255^{1}	8	3
9	41	(Spain) Aleix Espargaró	Ducati	1:29.231	1:29.255^{1}	9	3
10	49	(Italy) Fabio Di Giannantonio	Ducati	1:29.350	1:29.336	10	4
11	42	(Spain) Álex Rins	Suzuki	Qualified in Q2	1:29.424	11	4
12	33	(South Africa) Brad Binder	KTM	Qualified in Q2	1:29.536	12	4
13	10	(Italy) Luca Marini	Ducati	1:29.386	N/A	13	5
14	30	(Japan) Takaaki Nakagami	Honda	1:29.390	N/A	14	5
15	44	(Spain) Pol Espargaró	Honda	1:29.475	N/A	15	5
16	21	(Italy) Franco Morbidelli	Yamaha	1:29.540	N/A	16	6
17	88	(Portugal) Miguel Oliveira	KTM	1:29.613	N/A	17	6
18	6	(Germany) Stefan Bradl	Honda	1:29.809	N/A	18	6
19	4	(Italy) Andrea Dovizioso	Yamaha	1:30.085	N/A	19	7
20	72	(Italy) Marco Bezzecchi	Ducati	1:30.122	N/A	20	7
21	40	(South Africa) Darryn Binder	Yamaha	1:30.328	N/A	21	7
22	87	(Australia) Remy Gardner	KTM	1:30.397	N/A	22	8
23	25	(Spain) Raúl Fernández	KTM	1:30.475	N/A	23	8
24	32	(Italy) Lorenzo Savadori	Aprilia	1:30.487	N/A	24	8
25	73	(Spain) Álex Márquez	Honda	1:33.653	N/A	25	9
OFFICIAL MOTOGP QUALIFYING RESULTS

Notes

- ^a – Joan Mir and Aleix Espargaró set identical lap times in Q2. Mir got 8th position as his second fastest lap time was quicker.

=== Moto2 ===
Fastest session lap

Pos.	No.	Biker	Constructor	Qualifying times		Final grid	Row
Pos.	No.	Biker	Constructor	Q1	Q2	Final grid	Row
1	79	(Japan) Ai Ogura	Kalex	Qualified in Q2	1:33.933	1	1
2	21	(Spain) Alonso López	Boscoscuro	Qualified in Q2	1:33.981	2	1
3	37	(Spain) Augusto Fernández	Kalex	Qualified in Q2	1:34.101	3	1
4	96	(United Kingdom) Jake Dixon	Kalex	Qualified in Q2	1:34.104	4	2
5	35	(Thailand) Somkiat Chantra	Kalex	Qualified in Q2	1:34.105	5	2
6	51	(Spain) Pedro Acosta	Kalex	Qualified in Q2	1:34.126	6	2
7	13	(Italy) Celestino Vietti	Kalex	Qualified in Q2	1:34.170	7	3
8	23	(Germany) Marcel Schrötter	Kalex	1:34.325	1:34.245	8	3
9	75	(Spain) Albert Arenas	Kalex	Qualified in Q2	1:34.254	9	3
10	19	(Italy) Lorenzo Dalla Porta	Kalex	Qualified in Q2	1:34.257	10	4
11	6	(United States) Cameron Beaubier	Kalex	1:34.310	1:34.382	11	4
12	54	(Spain) Fermín Aldeguer	Boscoscuro	1:34.523	1:34.421	12	4
13	40	(Spain) Arón Canet	Kalex	Qualified in Q2	1:34.445	13	5
14	12	(Czech Republic) Filip Salač	Kalex	Qualified in Q2	1:34.516	14	5
15	14	(Italy) Tony Arbolino	Kalex	Qualified in Q2	1:34.602	15	5
16	64	(Netherlands) Bo Bendsneyder	Kalex	1:34.535	1:34.655	16	6
17	9	(Spain) Jorge Navarro	Kalex	Qualified in Q2	1:34.655	17	6
18	7	(Belgium) Barry Baltus	Kalex	Qualified in Q2	1:34.800	18	6
19	52	(Spain) Jeremy Alcoba	Kalex	1:34.619	N/A	19	7
20	16	(United States) Joe Roberts	Kalex	1:34.655	N/A	20	7
21	8	(Australia) Senna Agius	Kalex	1:34.938	N/A	21	7
22	42	(Spain) Marcos Ramírez	MV Agusta	1:34.996	N/A	22	8
23	61	(Italy) Alessandro Zaccone	Kalex	1:35.007	N/A	23	8
24	84	(Netherlands) Zonta van den Goorbergh	Kalex	1:35.117	N/A	24	8
25	28	(Italy) Niccolò Antonelli	Kalex	1:35.122	N/A	25	9
26	18	(Spain) Manuel González	Kalex	1:35.205	N/A	26	9
27	24	(Italy) Simone Corsi	MV Agusta	1:35.206	N/A	27	9
28	81	(Thailand) Keminth Kubo	Kalex	1:35.301	N/A	28	10
29	4	(United States) Sean Dylan Kelly	Kalex	1:35.651	N/A	29	10
30	29	(Japan) Taiga Hada	Kalex	1:35.721	N/A	30	10
31	33	(United Kingdom) Rory Skinner	Kalex	1:35.899	N/A	31	11
OFFICIAL MOTO2 QUALIFYING RESULTS

=== Moto3 ===
Fastest session lap

Pos.	No.	Biker	Constructor	Qualifying times		Final grid	Row
Pos.	No.	Biker	Constructor	Q1	Q2	Final grid	Row
1	96	(Spain) Daniel Holgado	KTM	Qualified in Q2	1:41.234	1	1
2	71	(Japan) Ayumu Sasaki	Husqvarna	Qualified in Q2	1:41.244	2	1
3	53	(Turkey) Deniz Öncü	KTM	Qualified in Q2	1:41.379	3	1
4	54	(Italy) Riccardo Rossi	Honda	Qualified in Q2	1:41.506	4	2
5	7	(Italy) Dennis Foggia	Honda	Qualified in Q2	1:41.588	5	2
6	10	(Brazil) Diogo Moreira	KTM	Qualified in Q2	1:41.627	6	2
7	24	(Japan) Tatsuki Suzuki	Honda	1:41.977	1:41.638	7	3
8	28	(Spain) Izan Guevara	Gas Gas	Qualified in Q2	1:41.642	8	3
9	27	(Japan) Kaito Toba	KTM	Qualified in Q2	1:41.675	9	3
10	82	(Italy) Stefano Nepa	Kalex	Qualified in Q2	1:41.714	10	4
11	11	(Spain) Sergio García	Gas Gas	Qualified in Q2	1:41.772	11	4
12	5	(Spain) Jaume Masià	KTM	Qualified in Q2	1:41.800	12	4
13	66	(Australia) Joel Kelso	KTM	1:42.193	1:41.857	13	5
14	16	(Italy) Andrea Migno	Honda	1:42.240	1:42.025	14	5
15	6	(Japan) Ryusei Yamanaka	KTM	1:42.008	1:42.112	15	5
16	44	(Spain) David Muñoz	KTM	Qualified in Q2	1:42.519	16	6
17	19	(United Kingdom) Scott Ogden	Honda	Qualified in Q2	1:42.683	17	6
18	17	(United Kingdom) John McPhee	Husqvarna	Qualified in Q2	1:42.951	18	6
19	48	(Spain) Iván Ortolá	KTM	1:42.290	N/A	19	7
20	72	(Japan) Taiyo Furusato	Honda	1:42.302	N/A	20	7
21	43	(Spain) Xavier Artigas	CFMoto	1:42.353	N/A	21	7
22	31	(Spain) Adrián Fernández	KTM	1:42.510	N/A	22	8
23	20	(France) Lorenzo Fellon	Honda	1:42.749	N/A	23	8
24	99	(Spain) Carlos Tatay	CFMoto	1:42.871	N/A	24	8
25	64	(Indonesia) Mario Aji	Honda	1:42.908	N/A	25	9
26	9	(Italy) Nicola Carraro	KTM	1:42.936	N/A	26	9
27	23	(Italy) Elia Bartolini	KTM	1:42.969	N/A	27	9
28	70	(United Kingdom) Joshua Whatley	Honda	1:43.644	N/A	28	10
29	67	(Italy) Alberto Surra	Honda	1:43.666	N/A	29	10
30	22	(Spain) Ana Carrasco	KTM	1:43.736	N/A	30	10
OFFICIAL MOTO3 QUALIFYING RESULTS

=== MotoE ===
Fastest session lap

Pos.	No.	Biker	Constructor	Qualifying times		Final grid	Row
Pos.	No.	Biker	Constructor	Q1	Q2	Final grid	Row
1	51	(Brazil) Eric Granado	Energica	Qualified in Q2	1:41.390	1	1
2	27	(Italy) Mattia Casadei	Energica	Qualified in Q2	1:41.530	2	1
3	11	(Italy) Matteo Ferrari	Energica	Qualified in Q2	1:41.569	3	1
4	21	(Italy) Kevin Zannoni	Energica	1:41.821	1:41.596	4	2
5	77	(Switzerland) Dominique Aegerter	Energica	Qualified in Q2	1:41.642	5	2
6	7	(Italy) Niccolò Canepa	Energica	Qualified in Q2	1:42.029	6	2
7	18	(Andorra) Xavi Cardelús	Energica	1:41.991	1:42.086	7	3
8	71	(Spain) Miquel Pons	Energica	Qualified in Q2	1:42.107	8	3
9	17	(Spain) Álex Escrig	Energica	Qualified in Q2	1:42.158	9	3
10	4	(Spain) Héctor Garzó	Energica	Qualified in Q2	1:42.192	10	4
11	40	(Spain) Jordi Torres	Energica	1.42.050	N/A	11	4
12	78	(Japan) Hikari Okubo	Energica	1:42.057	N/A	12	4
13	34	(Italy) Kevin Manfredi	Energica	1:42.217	N/A	13	5
14	12	(Spain) Xavi Forés	Energica	1:42.755	N/A	14	5
15	6	(Spain) María Herrera	Energica	1:42.768	N/A	15	5
16	38	(United Kingdom) Bradley Smith	Energica	1:42.780	N/A	16	6
17	70	(Spain) Marc Alcoba	Energica	1:43.359	N/A	17	6
OFFICIAL MOTOE Starting Grid

== Race ==
=== MotoGP ===
Pos.	No.	Biker	Team	Constructor	Laps	Time/Retired	Grid	Points
1	63	(Italy) Francesco Bagnaia	Ducati Lenovo Team	Ducati	28	42:14.886	2	25
2	20	(France) Fabio Quartararo	Monster Energy Yamaha MotoGP	Yamaha	28	+0.492	5	20
3	43	(Australia) Jack Miller	Ducati Lenovo Team	Ducati	28	+2.163	3	16
4	10	(Italy) Luca Marini	Mooney VR46 Racing Team	Ducati	28	+8.348	13	13
5	5	(France) Johann Zarco	Prima Pramac Racing	Ducati	28	+8.821	6	11
6	41	(Spain) Aleix Espargaró	Aprilia Racing	Aprilia	28	+11.287	9	10
7	33	(South Africa) Brad Binder	Red Bull KTM Factory Racing	KTM	28	+11.642	12	9
8	42	(Spain) Álex Rins	Team Suzuki Ecstar	Suzuki	28	+11.780	11	8
9	72	(Italy) Marco Bezzecchi	Mooney VR46 Racing Team	Ducati	28	+16.987	20	7
10	89	(Spain) Jorge Martín	Prima Pramac Racing	Ducati	28	+17.144	4	6
11	49	(Italy) Fabio Di Giannantonio	Gresini Racing MotoGP	Ducati	28	+17.471	10	5
12	88	(Portugal) Miguel Oliveira	Red Bull KTM Factory Racing	KTM	28	+18.035	17	4
13	12	(Spain) Maverick Viñales	Aprilia Racing	Aprilia	28	+20.012	7	3
14	73	(Spain) Álex Márquez	LCR Honda Castrol	Honda	28	+26.880	25	2
15	04	(Italy) Andrea Dovizioso	WithU Yamaha RNF MotoGP Team	Yamaha	28	+29.744	19	1
16	44	(Spain) Pol Espargaró	Repsol Honda Team	Honda	28	+30.994	15	
17	6	(Germany) Stefan Bradl	Repsol Honda Team	Honda	28	+37.960	18	
18	25	(Spain) Raúl Fernández	Tech3 KTM Factory Racing	KTM	28	+42.082	23	
19	32	(Italy) Lorenzo Savadori	Aprilia Racing	Aprilia	28	+46.666	24	
20	87	(Australia) Remy Gardner	Tech3 KTM Factory Racing	KTM	27	+1 lap	22	
Ret	21	(Italy) Franco Morbidelli	Monster Energy Yamaha MotoGP	Yamaha	25	Accident	16	
Ret	40	(South Africa) Darryn Binder	WithU Yamaha RNF MotoGP Team	Yamaha	12	Accident	21	
Ret	30	(Japan) Takaaki Nakagami	LCR Honda Idemitsu	Honda	9	Accident	14	
Ret	23	(Italy) Enea Bastianini	Gresini Racing MotoGP	Ducati	6	Wheel rim	1	
Ret	36	(Spain) Joan Mir	Team Suzuki Ecstar	Suzuki	0	Accident	8	
Fastest lap: (Spain) Jorge Martín (Ducati) – 1:29.854 (lap 8)
OFFICIAL MOTOGP RACE REPORT

=== Moto2 ===
Pos.	No.	Biker	Constructor	Laps	Time/Retired	Grid	Points
1	79	(Japan) Ai Ogura	Kalex	25	39:30.070	1	25
2	35	(Thailand) Somkiat Chantra	Kalex	25	+0.173	5	20
3	96	(United Kingdom) Jake Dixon	Kalex	25	+7.854	4	16
4	51	(Spain) Pedro Acosta	Kalex	25	+7.960	6	13
5	37	(Spain) Augusto Fernández	Kalex	25	+8.037	3	11
6	40	(Spain) Arón Canet	Kalex	25	+9.401	13	10
7	16	(Spain) Alonso López	Boscoscuro	25	+12.995	2	9
8	23	(Germany) Marcel Schrötter	Kalex	25	+18.254	8	8
9	75	(Spain) Albert Arenas	Kalex	25	+20.661	9	7
10	52	(Spain) Jeremy Alcoba	Kalex	25	+22.227	19	6
11	9	(Spain) Jorge Navarro	Kalex	25	+23.443	17	5
12	7	(Belgium) Barry Baltus	Kalex	25	+25.793	18	4
13	6	(United States) Cameron Beaubier	Kalex	25	+27.788	11	3
14	16	(United States) Joe Roberts	Kalex	25	+27.909	20	2
15	64	(Netherlands) Bo Bendsneyder	Kalex	25	+28.347	16	1
16	28	(Italy) Niccolò Antonelli	Kalex	25	+34.611	25	
17	8	(Australia) Senna Agius	Kalex	25	+34.928	21	
18	84	(Netherlands) Zonta van den Goorbergh	Kalex	25	+36.314	24	
19	42	(Spain) Marcos Ramírez	MV Agusta	25	+44.837	22	
20	24	(Italy) Simone Corsi	MV Agusta	25	+48.602	27	
21	33	(United Kingdom) Rory Skinner	Kalex	25	+48.814	31	
22	29	(Japan) Taiga Hada	Kalex	25	+59.204	30	
Ret	54	(Spain) Fermín Aldeguer	Boscoscuro	20	Accident	12	
Ret	13	(Italy) Celestino Vietti	Kalex	18	Accident	7	
Ret	14	(Italy) Tony Arbolino	Kalex	17	Collision	15	
Ret	19	(Italy) Lorenzo Dalla Porta	Kalex	17	Collision	10	
Ret	12	(Czech Republic) Filip Salač	Kalex	10	Accident	14	
Ret	18	(Spain) Manuel González	Kalex	6	Accident	26	
Ret	4	(United States) Sean Dylan Kelly	Kalex	5	Collision	29	
Ret	81	(Thailand) Keminth Kubo	Kalex	5	Collision	28	
Ret	61	(Italy) Alessandro Zaccone	Kalex	1	Accident	23	
Fastest lap: (Italy) Celestino Vietti (Kalex) – 1:34.073 (lap 14)
OFFICIAL MOTO2 RACE REPORT

=== Moto3 ===
Pos.	No.	Biker	Constructor	Laps	Time/Retired	Grid	Points
1	71	(Japan) Ayumu Sasaki	Husqvarna	23	39:03.516	2	25
2	24	(Japan) Tatsuki Suzuki	Honda	23	+0.064	7	20
3	44	(Spain) David Muñoz	KTM	23	+0.292	16	16
4	53	(Turkey) Deniz Öncü	KTM	23	+0.344	3	13
5	11	(Spain) Sergio García	Gas Gas	23	+2.453	11	11
6	10	(Brazil) Diogo Moreira	KTM	23	+2.636	6	10
7	28	(Spain) Izan Guevara	Gas Gas	23	+3.074	8	9
8	96	(Spain) Daniel Holgado	KTM	23	+3.109	1	8
9	17	(United Kingdom) John McPhee	Husqvarna	23	+7.474	18	7
10	27	(Japan) Kaito Toba	KTM	23	+7.713	9	6
11	48	(Spain) Ivan Ortolá	KTM	23	+7.786	19	5
12	7	(Italy) Dennis Foggia	Honda	23	+8.855	5	4
13	6	(Japan) Ryusei Yamanaka	KTM	23	+8.952	15	3
14	43	(Spain) Xavier Artigas	CFMoto	23	+9.143	21	2
15	82	(Italy) Stefano Nepa	KTM	23	+9.260	10	1
16	20	(France) Lorenzo Fellon	Honda	23	+17.777	23	
17	31	(Spain) Adrián Fernández	KTM	23	+20.558	22	
18	5	(Spain) Jaume Masià	KTM	23	+20.597	12	
19	54	(Italy) Riccardo Rossi	Honda	23	+20.632	4	
20	23	(Italy) Elia Bartolini	KTM	23	+20.659	27	
21	19	(United Kingdom) Scott Ogden	Honda	23	+20.738	17	
22	66	(Australia) Joel Kelso	KTM	23	+27.578	13	
23	16	(Italy) Andrea Migno	Honda	23	+30.848	14	
24	64	(Indonesia) Mario Aji	Honda	23	+31.432	25	
25	72	(Japan) Taiyo Furusato	Honda	23	+32.067	20	
26	9	(Italy) Nicola Carraro	KTM	23	+34.243	26	
27	67	(Italy) Alberto Surra	Honda	23	+49.114	29	
28	22	(Spain) Ana Carrasco	KTM	23	+49.173	30	
29	70	(United Kingdom) Joshua Whatley	Honda	23	+49.442	28	
Ret	99	(Spain) Carlos Tatay	CFMoto	9	Accident	24	
Fastest lap: (Spain) David Muñoz (KTM) – 1:40.910 (lap 23)
OFFICIAL MOTO3 RACE REPORT

=== MotoE ===
==== Race 1 ====
Pos.	No.	Biker	Laps	Time/Retired	Grid	Points
1	51	(Brazil) Eric Granado	7	11:55.313	1	25
2	77	(Switzerland) Dominique Aegerter	7	+1.271	5	20
3	71	(Spain) Miquel Pons	7	+1.797	8	16
4	78	(Japan) Hikari Okubo	7	+3.369	12	13
5	4	(Spain) Héctor Garzó	7	+3.589	10	11
6	17	(Spain) Álex Escrig	7	+3.619	9	10
7	21	(Italy) Kevin Zannoni	7	+3.904	4	9
8	40	(Spain) Jordi Torres	7	+4.634	11	8
9	12	(Spain) Xavi Forés	7	+11.745	14	7
10	34	(Italy) Kevin Manfredi	7	+11.911	13	6
11	6	(Spain) María Herrera	7	+14.111	15	5
12	70	(Spain) Marc Alcoba	7	+14.245	17	4
13	10	(Andorra) Xavi Cardelús	7	+16.888	7	3
14	11	(Italy) Matteo Ferrari	7	+38.622	3	2
Ret	27	(Italy) Mattia Casadei	6	Accident	2	
Ret	7	(Italy) Niccolò Canepa	3	Retired	6	
Ret	38	(United Kingdom) Bradley Smith	0	Accident	16	
DNS	72	(Italy) Alessio Finello		Did not start		
Fastest lap: (Brazil) Eric Granado – 1:41.064 (lap 3)
OFFICIAL MOTOE RACE NR.1 REPORT

Notes:

- Alessio Finello, who fell in FP1, suffered multiple fractures in his right foot and was forced to miss the Grand Prix.
- All bikes manufactured by Energica.

==== Race 2 ====
Pos.	No.	Biker	Laps	Time/Retired	Grid	Points
1	51	(Brazil) Eric Granado	7	11:54.464	1	25
2	71	(Spain) Miquel Pons	7	+0.248	8	20
3	77	(Switzerland) Dominique Aegerter	7	+0.428	5	16
4	27	(Italy) Mattia Casadei	7	+0.482	2	13
5	17	(Spain) Álex Escrig	7	+2.641	9	11
6	10	(Andorra) Xavi Cardelús	7	+2.769	7	10
7	78	(Japan) Hikari Okubo	7	+3.082	12	9
8	4	(Spain) Héctor Garzó	7	+3.311	10	8
9	11	(Italy) Matteo Ferrari	7	+3.952	3	7
10	40	(Spain) Jordi Torres	7	+4.455	11	6
11	34	(Italy) Kevin Manfredi	7	+5.469	13	5
12	7	(Italy) Niccolò Canepa	7	+5.785	6	4
13	21	(Italy) Kevin Zannoni	7	+6.534	4	3
14	6	(Spain) María Herrera	7	+7.403	15	2
15	70	(Spain) Marc Alcoba	7	+7.911	16	1
DNS	12	(Spain) Xavi Forés		Did not start	14	
DNS	38	(United Kingdom) Bradley Smith		Did not start		
DNS	72	(Italy) Alessio Finello		Did not start		
Fastest lap: (Spain) Miquel Pons – 1:41.163 (lap 2)
OFFICIAL MOTOE RACE NR.2 REPORT

Notes:

- Xavi Forés was in the final starting list but did not start the race. His place on the grid was left vacant.
- Bradley Smith suffered a fractured foot during race 1 and withdrew for race 2.
- Alessio Finello, who fell in FP1, suffered multiple fractures in his right foot and was forced to miss the Grand Prix.
- All bikes manufactured by Energica.

== Championship standings after the race ==
Below are the standings for the top five riders, constructors, and teams after the round.

=== MotoGP ===
Riders' Championship standings

	Pos.	Rider	Points
	1	(France) Fabio Quartararo	200
	2	(Spain) Aleix Espargaró	168
	3	(Italy) Francesco Bagnaia	156
1	4	(France) Johann Zarco	125
1	5	(Australia) Jack Miller	123

Constructors' Championship standings

Pos.	Constructor	Points
1	(Italy) Ducati	296
2	(Japan) Yamaha	200
3	(Italy) Aprilia	185
4	(Austria) KTM	140
5	(Japan) Suzuki	118

Teams' Championship standings

	Pos.	Team	Points
1	1	(Italy) Ducati Lenovo Team	279
1	2	(Italy) Aprilia Racing	253
	3	(Japan) Monster Energy Yamaha MotoGP	226
	4	(Italy) Prima Pramac Racing	212
	5	(Austria) Red Bull KTM Factory Racing	192

=== Moto2 ===
Riders' Championship standings

	Pos.	Rider	Points
1	1	(Japan) Ai Ogura	183
1	2	(Spain) Augusto Fernández	182
	3	(Italy) Celestino Vietti	156
	4	(Spain) Arón Canet	137
1	5	(United States) Joe Roberts	108

Constructors' Championship standings

Pos.	Constructor	Points
1	(Germany) Kalex	325
2	(Italy) Boscoscuro	86
3	(Italy) MV Agusta	5

Teams' Championship standings

	Pos.	Team	Points
1	1	(Japan) Idemitsu Honda Team Asia	275
1	2	(Finland) Red Bull KTM Ajo	270
	3	(Spain) Flexbox HP40	212
2	4	(Spain) Zinia GasGas Aspar Team	160
1	5	(Belgium) Elf Marc VDS Racing Team	159

=== Moto3 ===
Riders' Championship standings

	Pos.	Rider	Points
	1	(Spain) Sergio García	193
	2	(Spain) Izan Guevara	188
	3	(Italy) Dennis Foggia	144
2	4	(Japan) Ayumu Sasaki	138
1	5	(Spain) Jaume Masià	127

Constructors' Championship standings

Pos.	Constructor	Points
1	(Spain) Gas Gas	246
2	(Japan) Honda	226
3	(Austria) KTM	210
4	(Sweden) Husqvarna	167
5	(China) CFMoto	103

Teams' Championship standings

Pos.	Team	Points
1	(Spain) AutoSolar GasGas Aspar Team	381
2	(Luxembourg) Leopard Racing	258
3	(Finland) Red Bull KTM Ajo	183
4	(Italy) Sterilgarda Husqvarna Max	178
5	(France) Red Bull KTM Tech3	156

=== MotoE ===
	Pos.	Rider	Points
	1	(Switzerland) Dominique Aegerter	194
	2	(Brazil) Eric Granado	176.5
	3	(Italy) Matteo Ferrari	121.5
1	4	(Spain) Miquel Pons	115
1	5	(Italy) Mattia Casadei	111

Previous race: 2022 British Grand Prix	FIM Grand Prix World Championship; 2022 season	Next race: 2022 San Marino Grand Prix
Previous race: 2021 Austrian Grand Prix	Austrian motorcycle Grand Prix	Next race: 2023 Austrian Grand Prix
