= 2022 CIV Superbike Championship =

Motorcycle race season

2022 CIV Superbike Championship
Previous:	2021	Next:	2023
Support series: 2022 CIV Supersport 600 Championship; 2022 CIV Supersport 300 Championship; 2022 CIV Moto3 Championship

The 2022 campionato italiano velocità season is the 21st season of the CIV Superbike Championship. The season was contested over 6 rounds with 2 races per event, starting at Misano on 3 April and finished at Imola on 9 October.

Michele Pirro won his 6th title after beating closest rival Alessandro Delbianco.

== Race calendar and results ==
2022 Calendar
Round		Circuit	Date	Pole position	Fastest lap	Race winner	Winning team	Winning constructor	Ref
1	R1	Misano 1	2 April	(Italy) Michele Pirro	(Italy) Niccolò Canepa	(Italy) Luca Vitali	(Italy) Scuderia Improve - Firenze Motor	(Japan) Honda	
1	R2	Misano 1	3 April	(Italy) Michele Pirro	(Italy) Michele Pirro	(Italy) Michele Pirro	(Italy) Barni Spark Racing Team	(Italy) Ducati	
2	R1	Vallelunga	7 May	(Italy) Michele Pirro	(Italy) Michele Pirro	(Italy) Michele Pirro	(Italy) Barni Spark Racing Team	(Italy) Ducati	
2	R2	Vallelunga	8 May	(Italy) Michele Pirro	(Italy) Michele Pirro	(Italy) Michele Pirro	(Italy) Barni Spark Racing Team	(Italy) Ducati	
3	R1	Mugello 1	18 June	(Italy) Michele Pirro	(Italy) Michele Pirro	(Italy) Michele Pirro	(Italy) Barni Spark Racing Team	(Italy) Ducati	
3	R2	Mugello 1	19 June	(Italy) Michele Pirro	(Italy) Niccolò Canepa	(Italy) Michele Pirro	(Italy) Barni Spark Racing Team	(Italy) Ducati	
4	R1	Misano 2	30 July	(Italy) Alessandro Delbianco	(Italy) Alessandro Delbianco	(Italy) Michele Pirro	(Italy) Barni Spark Racing Team	(Italy) Ducati	
4	R2	Misano 2	31 July	(Italy) Alessandro Delbianco	(Italy) Michele Pirro	(Italy) Michele Pirro	(Italy) Barni Spark Racing Team	(Italy) Ducati	
5	R1	Mugello 2	17 September	(Italy) Alessandro Delbianco	(Italy) Michele Pirro	(Switzerland) Randy Krummenacher	(Italy) Keope Motor Team	(Japan) Yamaha	
5	R2	Mugello 2	18 September	(Italy) Alessandro Delbianco	(Italy) Michele Pirro	(Italy) Alessandro Delbianco	(Italy) Nuova M2 Racing	(Italy) Aprilia	
6	R1	Imola	8 October	(Italy) Michele Pirro	(Italy) Michele Pirro	(Italy) Alessandro Delbianco	(Italy) Nuova M2 Racing	(Italy) Aprilia	
6	R2	Imola	9 October	(Italy) Michele Pirro	(Italy) Andrea Mantovani	(Italy) Lorenzo Zanetti	(Italy) Broncos Racing Team	(Italy) Ducati	

== Entry list ==
EntryList
Team	Constructor	Motorcycle	No.	Rider	Rounds
(Italy) Nuova M2 Racing	Aprilia	Aprilia RSV4 RF	52	(Italy) Alessandro Delbianco	All
(Italy) Nuova M2 Racing	Aprilia	Aprilia RSV4 RF	72	(Italy) Doriano Vietti	All
(Italy) Nuova M2 Racing	Aprilia	Aprilia RSV4 RF	81	(Italy) Alex Bernardi	All
(Italy) Barni Spark Racing Team	Ducati	Panigale V4 R	51	(Italy) Michele Pirro	All
(Italy) Barni Spark Racing Team	Ducati	Panigale V4 R	55	(Czech Republic) Michal Filla	All
(Italy) Broncos Racing Team	Ducati	Panigale V4 R	9	(Italy) Andrea Mantovani	All
(Italy) Broncos Racing Team	Ducati	Panigale V4 R	87	(Italy) Lorenzo Zanetti	1, 4, 6
(Italy) Schacht Racing by Barni	Ducati	Panigale V4 R	159	(Denmark) Alex Schacht	All
(Italy) DMR Racing	Honda	CBR1000RR-R	10	(Italy) Agostino Santoro	5–6
(Italy) DMR Racing	Honda	CBR1000RR-R	16	(Italy) Matteo Giacomazzo	1–5
(Italy) DMR Racing	Honda	CBR1000RR-R	27	(Italy) Alessio Finello	6
(Italy) DMR Racing	Honda	CBR1000RR-R	33	(Italy) Flavio Ferroni	1–4
(Italy) Scuderia Improve - Firenze Motor	Honda	CBR1000RR-R	70	(Italy) Luca Vitali	All
(Italy) TCF Racing Team	Honda	CBR1000RR-R	73	(Italy) Simone Saltarelli	4
(Italy) The Blacksheep Team	Honda	CBR1000RR-R	10	(Italy) Agostino Santoro	1–4
(Italy) The Blacksheep Team	Honda	CBR1000RR-R	11	(Italy) Alessandro Andreozzi	5–6
(Italy) Black Flag Motorsport	Kawasaki	Ninja ZX-10RR	32	(Portugal) Sheridan Morais	1–3
(Italy) Black Flag Motorsport	Kawasaki	Ninja ZX-10RR	76	(Italy) Samuele Cavalieri	4–6
(Italy) Penta Motorsport	Suzuki	GSX-R1000R	34	(Italy) Kevin Manfredi	2–4, 6
(Italy) Penta Motorsport	Suzuki	GSX-R1000R	134	(United Kingdom) Danny Webb	1
(Italy) Faienta Motors by Speedaction	Yamaha	YZF-R1	53	(Italy) Gianluca Sconza	All
(Italy) Keope Motor Team	Yamaha	YZF-R1	21	(Switzerland) Randy Krummenacher	2–6
(Italy) Keope Motor Team	Yamaha	YZF-R1	24	(Italy) Simone Corsi	4
(Italy) Keope Motor Team	Yamaha	YZF-R1	33	(Italy) Flavio Ferroni	5–6
(Italy) Keope Motor Team	Yamaha	YZF-R1	54	(Italy) Mattia Pasini	1
(Italy) Keope Motor Team	Yamaha	YZF-R1	59	(Italy) Niccolò Canepa	1–3

Key
Regular rider
Wildcard rider
Replacement rider

- All entries use Pirelli tyres.

== Championship standings ==
=== Riders' standings ===
Position	1st	2nd	3rd	4th	5th	6th	7th	8th	9th	10th	11th	12th	13th	14th	15th
Points	25	20	16	13	11	10	9	8	7	6	5	4	3	2	1

Pos.	Rider	Bike	MIS 1		VAL		MUG 1		MIS 2		MUG 2		IMO		Pts.
1	(Italy) Michele Pirro	Ducati	12^{P}	1^{PF}	1^{PF}	1^{PF}	1^{PF}	1^{P}	1	1^{F}	11^{F}	Ret^{F}	11^{PF}	5^{P}	200
2	(Italy) Alessandro Delbianco	Aprilia	9	3	3	2	5	4	2^{PF}	2^{P}	Ret^{P}	1^{P}	1	3	189
3	(Italy) Luca Vitali	Honda	1	6	6	4	Ret	6	3	6	3	3	3	4	155
4	(Italy) Andrea Mantovani	Ducati	Ret	4	4	Ret	2	2	5	5	WD	WD	2	2^{F}	128
5	(Switzerland) Randy Krummenacher	Yamaha			5	Ret	4	5	8	3	1	2	4	Ret	117
6	(Italy) Niccolò Canepa	Yamaha	3^{F}	2	2	3	3	3^{F}							104
7	(Italy) Agostino Santoro	Honda	WD	WD	10	5	7	7	17	Ret	4	5	5	7	79
8	(Italy) Doriano Vietti	Aprilia	6	8	8	Ret	9	10	10	9	6	Ret	9	10	75
9	(Italy) Alex Bernardi	Aprilia	4	DNS	DNS	DNS	6	Ret	9	14	2	Ret	7	8	69
10	(Italy) Lorenzo Zanetti	Ducati	2	DNS					4	7			Ret	1	67
11	(Italy) Flavio Ferroni	Honda	5	5	7	Ret	DNS	Ret	12	12					63
11	(Italy) Flavio Ferroni	Yamaha									5	4	EX	Ret	63
12	(Czech Republic) Michal Filla	Ducati	8	11	12	8	11	Ret	15	Ret	8	9	8	9	61
13	(Italy) Kevin Manfredi	Suzuki			9	7	8	8	11	10			10	6	59
14	(Italy) Gianluca Sconza	Yamaha	13	12	14	9	12	9	14	11	10	7	DNS	11	54
15	(Portugal) Sheridan Morais	Kawasaki	7	9	13	6	10	11							40
16	(Italy) Matteo Giacomazzo	Honda	10	10	11	Ret	13	12	16	13	9	Ret			34
17	(Italy) Alessandro Andreozzi	Honda									7	8	6	Ret	27
18	(Italy) Simone Corsi	Yamaha							6	4					23
19	(Italy) Samuele Cavalieri	Kawasaki							13	8	Ret	6	DNS	DNS	21
20	(Italy) Mattia Pasini	Yamaha	Ret	7											9
21	(Italy) Simone Saltarelli	Honda							7	Ret					9
22	(United Kingdom) Danny Webb	Suzuki	11	Ret											5
	(Italy) Alessio Finello	Honda											DNS	DNS	
	(Denmark) Alex Schacht	Ducati	DNP	DNP	DNP	DNP	DNP	DNP	DNP	DNP	DNP	DNP	DNP	DNP	
Pos.	Rider	Bike	MIS 1		VAL		MUG 1		MIS 2		MUG 2		IMO		Pts.

Colour	Result
Gold	Winner
Silver	Second place
Bronze	Third place
Green	Points classification
Blue	Non-points classification
Blue	Non-classified finish (NC)
Purple	Retired, not classified (Ret)
Red	Did not qualify (DNQ)
Red	Did not pre-qualify (DNPQ)
Black	Disqualified (DSQ)
White	Did not start (DNS)
White	Withdrew (WD)
White	Race cancelled (C)
Blank	Did not practice (DNP)
Blank	Did not arrive (DNA)
Blank	Excluded (EX)

P – Pole position
F – Fastest lap
Source :
