= Sylvain Guintoli =

French motorcycle racer (born 1982)

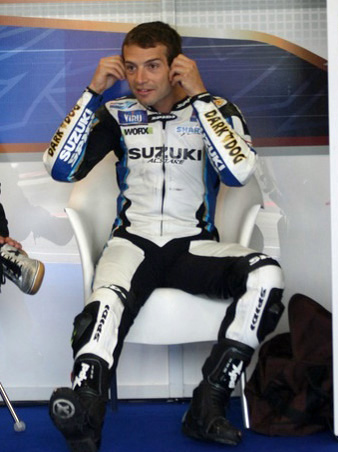
- Guintoli at Silverstone in 2010
- Nationality: French
- Born: 24 June 1982 (age 44); Montélimar, France
- Bike number: 50
Motorcycle racing career statistics
MotoGP World Championship
Active years	2002, 2007–2008, 2017–2019
Manufacturers	Yamaha, Ducati, Suzuki
2019 championship position	25th (7 pts)
Starts / Wins / Podiums / Poles / F. laps / Points; 48 / 0 / 0 / 0 / 0 / 125
250cc World Championship
Active years	2001, 2003–2006
Manufacturers	Aprilia
2006 championship position	9th (96 pts)
Starts / Wins / Podiums / Poles / F. laps / Points; 80 / 0 / 1 / 0 / 0 / 367
Superbike World Championship
Active years	2009–2017
Manufacturers	Suzuki, Ducati, Aprilia, Honda, Yamaha, Kawasaki
Championships	1 (2014)
2017 championship position	18th (34 pts)
Starts / Wins / Podiums / Poles / F. laps / Points; 170 / 9 / 42 / 4 / 12 / 1837.5

Sylvain Jean-Baptiste Guintoli (born 24 June 1982) is a French professional motorcycle racer and race analyst for television. He was the Superbike World Champion in 2014, riding an Aprilia RSV4. Guintoli has also won the FIM Endurance World Championship twice, both times with Suzuki, in 2010 and 2021. Until the Suzuki MotoGP team's withdrawal from racing in 2022, he was contracted as their test and development rider, with occasional race entries as a wild card or replacement rider. In 2024, Guintoli was contracted as a test rider, together with Bradley Smith, for the BMW Motorrad World Superbike team, delivered by Shaun Muir Racing.

In 2021, Guintoli was the winner of the 24 Hours of Le Mans endurance race along with Xavier Siméon and Gregg Black, followed by the Bol d'Or riding a Suzuki GSX-R1000. In 2022, he suffered a wrist injury preventing his entry into the Suzuka 8 Hours race, and a chance to race for the final time in MotoGP, as a replacement for Joan Mir.

Guintoli spent the early years of his career in the 250cc Grand Prix World Championship on private bikes. He was a 500cc 2 stroke test rider for Yamaha and made a single MotoGP start in 2002. He was given a full-time MotoGP seat in 2007 by Yamaha, and was the only rookie that year, winning rookie of the year by default. Guintoli switched to Ducati in 2008, finishing 13th in the final standings. After a serious leg injury in 2009, he recovered and switched to the World Superbike Championship, becoming champion in 2014. He has also competed in the British Superbike Championship in 2017, riding the Suzuki GSX-R1000 that has won him so many titles.

== Career ==
=== 250cc & MotoGP World Championship ===
==== 2000 ====
Guintoli made his grand prix debut in the 250cc class for the Équipe du France, partnering Julian da Costa for the French GP, with a Honda. He qualified 24th out of 33 riders, two second and a half faster than da Costa, 32nd. He retired during the first few laps with a mechanical issue.

==== 2001 ====
Guintoli joined the French team Équipe du France - Scrab GP with fellow Frenchman Randy de Puniet in 250 Grand-Prix. He finished 14th in the 250 World Championship with 44 points. His best result was a fourth place at the Dutch Grand Prix. He raced an Aprilia 250.

==== 2002 ====
For the 2002 season, Guintoli became the test driver for the Yamaha team, so he did not raced full-time that year. He raced his first MotoGP race at the Czech race for the French Yamaha Tech 3 team, having qualified 21st and finished 17th. This was his last race of the year, as he returned to his test drive position until the end of the year.

==== 2003 ====
For the 2003 season, Guintoli returned to the 250cc class, racing for the Campetella Racing, riding a private Aprilia, partnering Italian Franco Battaini. He showed some good pace, fighting consistently for midpoints scoring positions.

Guintoli finished his first race of the year, at Suzuka in ninth place.

Guintoli started to get more competitive with a sixth and a fifth place at Mugello and Le Mans respectively. He even scored his first podium at Assen, finishing third in wet conditions, not far behind than race-winner Anthony West and Franco Battaini, both in Aprilias. He then scored some other strong points, finishing in fourth place twice, at the Rio GP and at Valencia.

Guintoli finished the year in tenth place with 104 points.

==== 2004 ====
For the 2004 season, Guintoli remained with Campetella Racing, riding again on a private 250 Aprilia. He was partnered again by Franco Battaini and this time also by Joan Olivé. This year, the team struggled and none of them scored podiums.

Guintoli finished the year in 14th place with 42 points, his best result being a seventh place at Barcelona. Battaini finished in front of the Frenchman in tenth place with 93 points and Olivé behind in 19th place with 27 points.

==== 2005 ====
For the 2005 season, Guintoli returned to the Équipe du France GP Scrab, partnered first by Grégory Leblanc and then by Mathieu Gines, both French. He once again rode an Aprilia 250.

Nothing changed from last year, with Guintoli again finishing in midpoints scoring positions. He finished the season in tenth place, with 84 points. He outpaced his two teammates, with Leblanc who scored six points and Gines none.

==== 2006 ====
Guintoli was confirmed by the French team Equipe du France GP Scrab also for 2006, with rookie Jules Cluzel as his partner. Guintoli finished the year in ninth position, scoring 96 points, with Cluzel 20th.

=== Return to MotoGP ===
==== 2007 ====
After having several years in the 250 cc class, Guintoli raced in the MotoGP class for the Tech 3 Yamaha team in 2007. He described the opportunity as a "dream come true", but suffered a setback early in testing when he crashed and broke his collarbone, eliminating him from testing for several weeks. The Tech 3 team was one of the backmarkers and Guintoli has scored solid lower-order points in 2007, always qualifying in front of his teammate Makoto Tamada and the Kawasakis. He shone in damp conditions at Le Mans, briefly leading before falling, but rejoining to finish tenth. He finished fourth at the Motegi GP, making this his best MotoGP finish, and Dunlop's best finish on an 800cc bike. There were further regular lower-point finishes in 2007. He finished the season in sixteenth place, with 50 points, against Tamada's 38.

==== 2008 ====
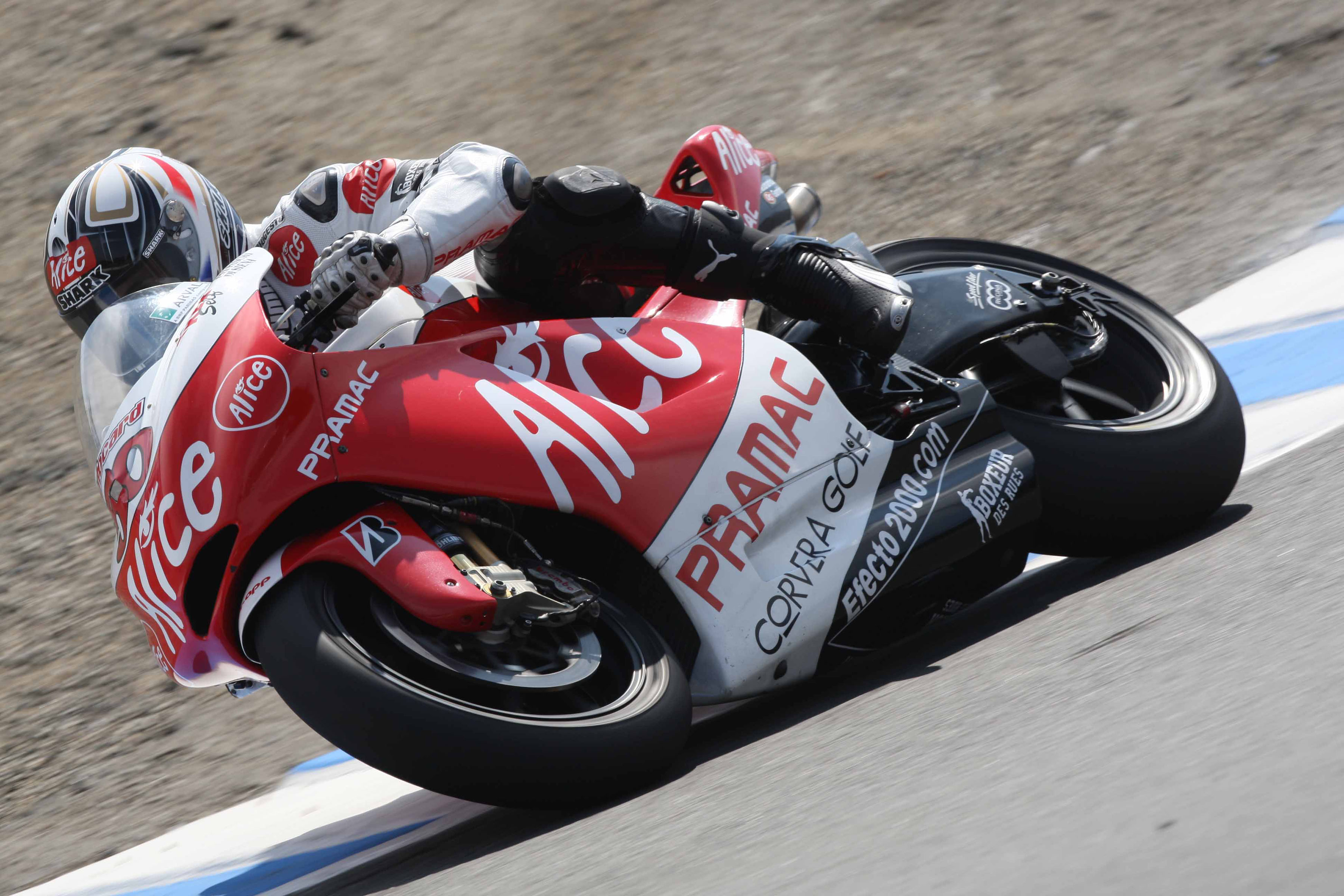
Guintoli at the 2008 United States Grand Prix

Guintoli was officially snapped up by Luis d'Antin, to ride the Ducati Desmocedici in 2008 for Pramac d'Antin, now renamed as Alice Team (replacing Alex Hofmann), on Saturday 15 September. Guintoli had an average 2008 finishing 13th in the championship, with his best finish being a sixth in the German Grand Prix. At the end of the season, Alice Team did not renew Guintoli's contract and with no other seats free he was forced to leave MotoGP to find a ride.

=== British Superbike Championship ===
==== 2009 ====
Guintoli then took a step down to the British Superbike Championship for the 2009 season, riding for the Worx Crescent Suzuki team as their sole rider. Guintoli started his debut season in the British Superbike Championship impressively with a first and second at the Brands Hatch Indy circuit. However, during the buildup to race 5 of the championship at Donington Park, Guintoli was involved in a collision with Josh Brookes. The incident left Guintoli with a broken tibia and fibula in his right leg, with him expected to miss several rounds He finished the season in eighth place, with 166 points, having scored one win and three further podiums in his first four races.

==== 2017 ====
In 2017, Guintoli returned to the British Superbike Championship riding a Suzuki. He skipped two rounds mid-season, having re-joined part-time the MotoGP class after six years to replace the injured Alex Rins, again for Suzuki.

With three rounds to go, Guintoli was classified on 15th position, with 79 points, and was the highest placed Suzuki rider. His best result was a fourth place at the opening race at Silverstone on 10 September, till another fourth place and a final win, first, at Assen.

=== Superbike World Championship ===
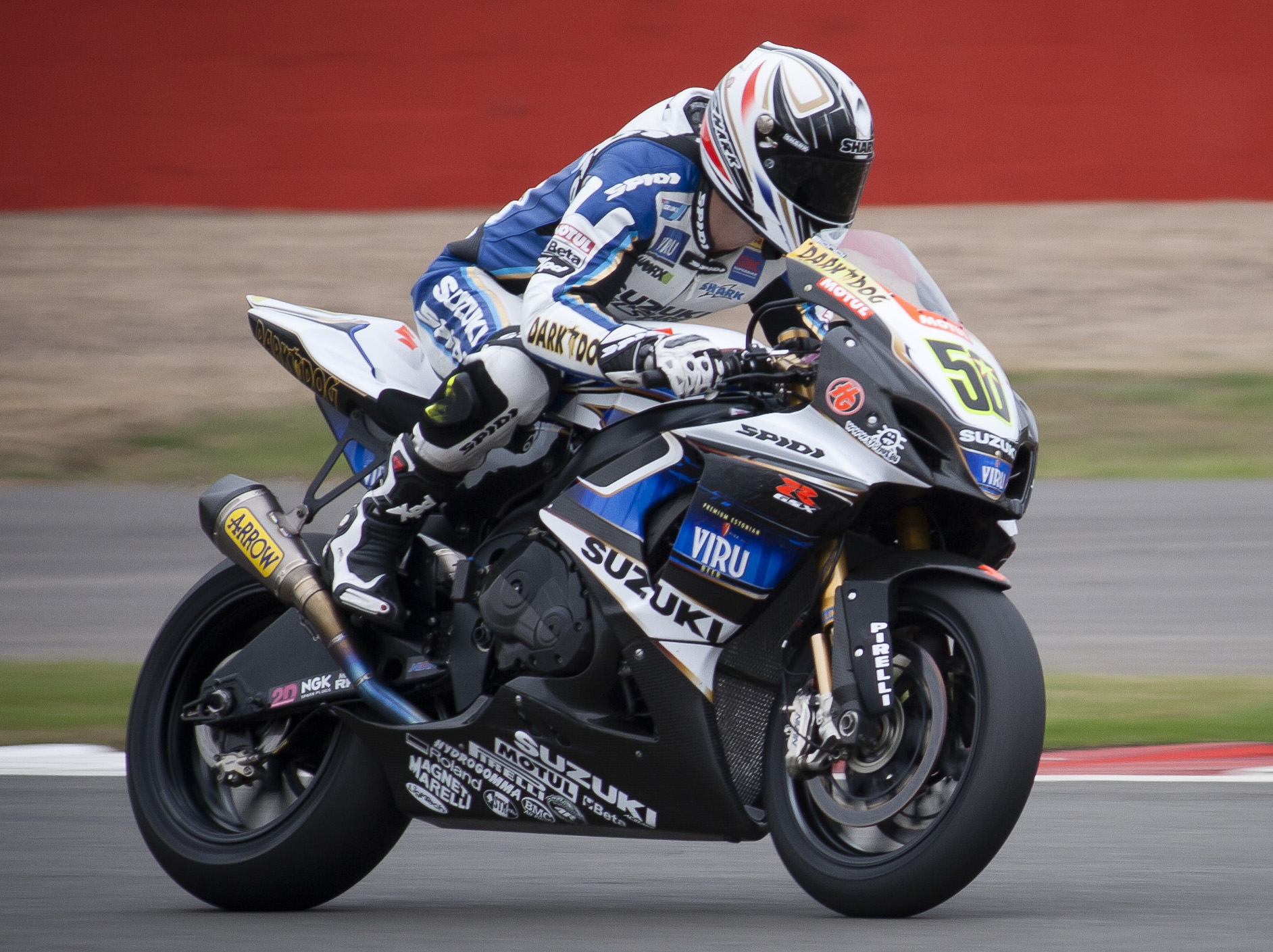
Guintoli finished the 2010 season in seventh place, despite not finishing on the podium in any of the season's races

After finishing the British Superbike Championship season with three fifth places at Oulton Park, Guintoli was signed up for another season with the Worx Crescent Suzuki squad. But when Max Neukirchner suddenly left Suzuki to join Honda, Guintoli was drafted in as his replacement for the 2010 season. Guintoli then rode the final World Superbike Championship round of the 2009 season in Portimão finishing tenth in the second race. He was competitive at the opening round, but was disappointed with his own performance at round two in Portugal, where he took a best finish of ninth on a bike that teammate Leon Haslam rode to a victory. He did not finish as high as fourth again until round nine, but had scored points in every race at this stage. For 2011, Guintoli has signed with Liberty Cz Group-backed Liberty Ducati, based in Prague, Czech Republic. His teammate will be WSBK veteran and former Guandalini Ducati/Aprilia rider Jakub Smrz. In 2012, Guintoli achieved his and the team's first win at the third round of the season, in Assen. He will top the podium twice again over the course of the season, first at Silverstone and then in the home-round at Magny Cours. He joined the Aprilia factory team in 2013 as a replacement for Max Biaggi, taking one win and finishing third overall in the Championship behind Tom Sykes and Eugene Laverty. He retained his seat for the 2014 Superbike World Championship season, and started the season on a high note by winning Race 2 in the opening round at Phillip Island. Four more wins would follow during the course of the season, culminating in his championship-winning double win at the closing round in Losail. Guintoli is the first French World Superbike champion since Raymond Roche in 1990. For the 2015 Superbike World Championship season, he joined Pata Honda World Superbike. He finished in front of his young teammate Michael van der Mark in the championship.

In 2016, Guintoli was hired by the new factory Yamaha World Superbike Team to ride the new R1. He suffered a brutal crash in Imola and broke several bones. He missed ten races but came back to finish the season with a first podium for the squad in Doha, Qatar. He also ended the season in front of his teammate Alex Lowes.

=== Other championships ===
==== Endurance ====
Guintoli's first race in the World Endurance Championship was at the end of 2010. He rode for Suzuki SERT Team in the final round Doha, Qatar. They won the race and the 2010 World title following this result.

Guintoli also raced for the factory Suzuki Yoshimura Team in the Suzuka 8H in 2017 (7th), 2018 (10th) and 2019 (5th).

For the EWC 2021 season, Guintoli was part of the Championship-winning team with Gregg Black and Xavier Siméon riding for Yoshimura-Sert Suzuki.

Guintoli would partner up with Naomichi Uramoto and Hannes Soomer in the AutoRace Ube Racing Team for the 2026 FIM Endurance World Championship.

== Le Mans cars ==
Having won the Le Mans 24-hour motorcycle endurance race, Guintoli has ambitions to become a successful car driver and be the first Le Mans 24-hour winner on both two and four wheels.

== Career statistics ==
=== All-time statistics ===
Series	Years	Races	Poles	Podiums	**Wins**	**2nd place**	**3rd place**	Fastest laps	Titles
250cc World Championship	^{2000–2006}	80	0	1	0	0	1	0	0
MotoGP World Championship	^{2002, 2007–2008, 2011, 2017–2019}	48	0	0	0	0	0	0	0
British Superbike Championship	^{2009, 2017}	13	1	4	1	1	2	0	0
Superbike World Championship	^{2009−2017}	170	4	42	9	18	13	12	1
Total		311	5	47	10	19	16	12	1

=== Grand Prix motorcycle racing ===
==== Races by year ====
(key) (Races in bold indicate pole position; races in italics indicate fastest lap)

Year	Class	Bike	1	2	3	4	5	6	7	8	9	10	11	12	13	14	15	16	17	18	19	Pos	Pts
2000	250cc	Honda	RSA	MAL	JPN	SPA	FRA; Ret	ITA	CAT	NED	GBR	GER	CZE	POR	VAL	BRA	PAC	AUS				NC	0
2001	250cc	Aprilia	JPN; 15	RSA; 12	SPA; Ret	FRA; 14	ITA; Ret	CAT; 18	NED; 4	GBR; 7	GER; Ret	CZE; 13	POR; Ret	VAL; 16	PAC; 16	AUS; Ret	MAL; 9	BRA; 11				14th	44
2002	MotoGP	Yamaha	JPN	RSA	SPA	FRA	ITA	CAT	NED	GBR	GER	CZE; 17	POR	BRA	PAC	MAL	AUS	VAL				NC	0
2003	250cc	Aprilia	JPN; 10	RSA; 9	SPA; Ret	FRA; 6	ITA; 5	CAT; 8	NED; 3	GBR; Ret	GER; Ret	CZE; 8	POR; 7	BRA; 4	PAC; Ret	MAL; DNS	AUS; Ret	VAL; 4				10th	101
2004	250cc	Aprilia	RSA; 15	SPA; Ret	FRA; Ret	ITA; 13	CAT; 7	NED; Ret	BRA; 12	GER; 10	GBR; 10	CZE; Ret	POR; Ret	JPN; 19	QAT; 11	MAL; Ret	AUS; 8	VAL; Ret				14th	42
2005	250cc	Aprilia	SPA; Ret	POR; 8	CHN; 12	FRA; 9	ITA; Ret	CAT; 8	NED; 12	GBR; 9	GER; 11	CZE; 10	JPN; 10	MAL; 9	QAT; 9	AUS; 10	TUR; 9	VAL; 14				10th	84
2006	250cc	Aprilia	SPA; 9	QAT; 6	TUR; 6	CHN; 12	FRA; 9	ITA; 11	CAT; 8	NED; Ret	GBR; 8	GER; 10	CZE; 9	MAL; 7	AUS; Ret	JPN; Ret	POR; 8	VAL; 10				9th	96
2007	MotoGP	Yamaha	QAT; 15	SPA; 15	TUR; 15	CHN; 13	FRA; 10	ITA; 14	CAT; 14	GBR; 16	NED; 14	GER; Ret	USA; 13	CZE; 13	RSM; 12	POR; 14	JPN; 4	AUS; 14	MAL; 19	VAL; 11		16th	50
2008	MotoGP	Ducati	QAT; 15	SPA; 16	POR; 15	CHN; 15	FRA; 13	ITA; 11	CAT; 13	GBR; 13	NED; 10	GER; 6	USA; 12	CZE; 12	RSM; 11	IND; 7	JPN; 14	AUS; 14	MAL; 13	VAL; 12		13th	67
2011	MotoGP	Ducati	QAT	SPA	POR	FRA	CAT	GBR	NED	ITA	GER; 17	USA	CZE	IND	RSM	ARA	JPN	AUS	MAL	VAL		NC	0
2017	MotoGP	Suzuki	QAT	ARG	AME	SPA	FRA; 15	ITA; 17	CAT; 17	NED	GER	CZE	AUT	GBR	RSM	ARA	JPN	AUS	MAL	VAL		27th	1
2018	MotoGP	Suzuki	QAT	ARG	AME	SPA	FRA	ITA	CAT; Ret	NED	GER	CZE; 19	AUT	GBR	RSM	ARA	THA	JPN; 21	AUS	MAL	VAL	31st	0
2019	MotoGP	Suzuki	QAT	ARG	AME	SPA	FRA	ITA	CAT; 13	NED	GER	CZE; 20	AUT	GBR; 12	RSM	ARA	THA	JPN; 20	AUS	MAL	VAL	25th	7

=== British Superbike Championship ===
==== Races by year ====
(key)

Year	Bike	BHI (England)		OUL (England)		DON (England)		THR (England)		SNE (England)		KNO (Scotland)		MAL (England)		BHGP (England)			CAD (England)		CRO (England)		SIL (England)		OUL (England)			Pos	Pts
Year	Bike	R1	R2	R1	R2	R1	R2	R1	R2	R1	R2	R1	R2	R1	R2	R1	R2	R3	R1	R2	R1	R2	R1	R2	R1	R2	R3	Pos	Pts
2009	Suzuki	1	2	3	3	DNS	DNS												8	7	Ret	13	7	8	5	5	5	8th	147

(key) (Races in bold indicate pole position; races in italics indicate fastest lap)

Year	Make	1		2		3			4		5		6			7		8			9			10		11		12			Pos	Pts
Year	Make	R1	R2	R1	R2	R1	R2	R3	R1	R2	R1	R2	R1	R2	R3	R1	R2	R1	R2	R3	R1	R2	R3	R1	R2	R1	R2	R1	R2	R3	Pos	Pts
2017	Suzuki	DON; Ret	DON; 7	BHI; Ret	BHI; 10	OUL; Ret	OUL; 11		KNO; 8	KNO; 14	SNE; 10	SNE; 9	BHGP; Ret	BHGP; 17		THR; 10	THR; 8	CAD; 18	CAD; 10		SIL; 13	SIL; 4	SIL; Ret	OUL; Ret	OUL; 11	ASS; 4	ASS; 1	BHGP; DNS	BHGP; 12	BHGP; 11	13th	131

=== Superbike World Championship ===
==== Races by year ====
(key) (Races in bold indicate pole position; races in italics indicate fastest lap)

Year	Bike	1		2		3		4		5		6		7		8		9		10		11		12		13		14		Pos	Pts
Year	Bike	R1	R2	R1	R2	R1	R2	R1	R2	R1	R2	R1	R2	R1	R2	R1	R2	R1	R2	R1	R2	R1	R2	R1	R2	R1	R2	R1	R2	Pos	Pts
2009	Suzuki	AUS	AUS	QAT	QAT	SPA	SPA	NED	NED	ITA	ITA	RSA	RSA	USA	USA	SMR	SMR	GBR	GBR	CZE	CZE	GER	GER	ITA	ITA	FRA	FRA	POR; 10	POR; Ret	33rd	6
2010	Suzuki	AUS; 6	AUS; 4	POR; 13	POR; 9	SPA; 9	SPA; 6	NED; 14	NED; 13	ITA; 10	ITA; 7	RSA; 10	RSA; 15	USA; 8	USA; 6	SMR; 5	SMR; 6	CZE; 6	CZE; 7	GBR; 12	GBR; 7	GER; 8	GER; 6	ITA; 9	ITA; 8	FRA; DSQ	FRA; 4			7th	197
2011	Ducati	AUS; Ret	AUS; DNS	EUR; 11	EUR; 11	NED; Ret	NED; 10	ITA; 12	ITA; 7	USA; 3	USA; 7	SMR; 7	SMR; 7	SPA; 11	SPA; 11	CZE; 20	CZE; 9	GBR; 6	GBR; 6	GER; 6	GER; 2	ITA; 6	ITA; 7	FRA; 6	FRA; 5	POR; 2	POR; 5			6th	210
2012	Ducati	AUS; 3	AUS; Ret	ITA; Ret	ITA; 11	NED; 1	NED; 2	**ITA**; C	**ITA**; Ret	EUR; 8	EUR; 5	USA; 12	USA; 10	SMR; 8	SMR; Ret	SPA; 12	SPA; 13	CZE	CZE	GBR; 16	GBR; 1	RUS; Ret	RUS; 11	GER; 6	GER; 10	POR; 3	POR; 4	FRA; 1	FRA; 3	7th	213.5
2013	Aprilia	AUS; 1	AUS; 2	SPA; 2	SPA; 2	NED; 3	NED; 6	ITA; 4	ITA; 4	GBR; 3	GBR; 2	POR; 2	POR; 2	ITA; Ret	ITA; 3	RUS; 6	RUS; C	GBR; 4	GBR; 6	GER; 4	GER; 5	TUR; 4	TUR; 3	**USA**; 5	**USA**; 5	FRA; 2	FRA; 3	SPA; 4	SPA; 3	**3rd**	**402**
2014	Aprilia	**AUS**; 3	**AUS**; 1	SPA; 6	SPA; 4	NED; 1	NED; 9	ITA; 5	ITA; 3	GBR; 7	GBR; 3	**MAL**; 2	**MAL**; 2	SMR; 5	SMR; 4	POR; 2	POR; 7	USA; 2	USA; 2	SPA; 2	SPA; 2	FRA; 1	FRA; 2	QAT; 1	QAT; 1					**1st**	**416**
2015	Honda	AUS; 7	AUS; 5	THA; 5	THA; 6	SPA; 9	SPA; Ret	NED; 8	NED; 7	ITA; 8	ITA; Ret	GBR; 8	GBR; 8	POR; 5	POR; 6	SMR; 9	SMR; 9	USA; 7	USA; Ret	MAL; 4	MAL; 4	SPA; 10	SPA; 9	FRA; 3	FRA; 6	QAT; 10	QAT; 5			6th	218
2016	Yamaha	AUS; 6	AUS; 5	THA; 7	THA; 6	SPA; 9	SPA; 10	NED; Ret	NED; 11	ITA; DNS	ITA; DNS	MAL	MAL	GBR	GBR	ITA	ITA	USA	USA	GER; 9	GER; 5	FRA; 9	FRA; 8	SPA; 6	SPA; 5	QAT; 3	QAT; 4			11th	141
2017	Kawasaki	AUS	AUS	THA	THA	SPA	SPA	NED	NED	ITA	ITA	GBR	GBR	ITA	ITA	USA	USA	GER	GER	POR	POR	FRA	FRA	SPA; 6	SPA; 8	QAT; 8	QAT; 8			18th	34

=== FIM EWC ===
==== By year ====
(key) (Races in bold indicate pole position; races in italics indicate fastest lap)

Year	Bike	1				2			3				4		Pos	Pts
Year	Bike	Grid	8 Hrs	16 Hrs	24 Hrs	Grid	8 Hrs	12 Hrs	Grid	8 Hrs	16 Hrs	24 Hrs	Grid	6 Hrs	Pos	Pts
2021	Suzuki GSX-R 1000R	LMS; 4	LMS; 10	LMS; 10	LMS; 10	EST; 3	EST; 0	EST; 9	BOL; 5	BOL; 10	BOL; 10	BOL; 40	MOS; 3	MOS; 31,5	1st	175,5

==== By team ====
Year	Team	Bike	Rider	TC
2010	(France) Suzuki Endurance Racing Team	Suzuki GSX-R1000	(France) Vincent Philippe (France) Sylvain Guintoli (France) Freddy Foray (France) Guillame Dietrich (Japan) Daisaku Sakai	1st
2022	(Japan) Yoshimura Suzuki Endurance Racing Team	Suzuki GSX-R1000	(France) Gregg Black (France) Sylvain Guintoli (Belgium) Xavier Siméon (Japan) Kazuki Watanabe	2nd
2023	(France) Yoshimura Suzuki Endurance Racing Team	Suzuki GSX-R1000	(France) Gregg Black (France) Sylvain Guintoli (France) Étienne Masson	2nd
2024	(Belgium) BMW Motorrad World Endurance Team	BMW M1000RR	(Germany) Markus Reiterberger (Ukraine) Illia Mykhalchyk (France) Sylvain Guintoli	3rd
2026	(Japan) AutoRace Ube Racing Team	BMW M1000RR	(Japan) Naomichi Uramoto (France) Sylvain Guintoli (Estonia) Hannes Soomer	

Year	Team	Bike	Tyre	Rider	Pts	TC
2025	(Belgium) BMW Motorrad World Endurance Team	BMW M1000RR	**B**	(Germany) Markus Reiterberger (South Africa) Steven Odendaal (France) Sylvain Guintoli	70*	2nd*

=== Suzuka 8 Hours ===
Year	Class	Team	Co-riders	Bike	Pos
2026	**EWC**	(Japan) AutoRace Ube Racing Team	(Japan) Naomichi Uramoto (Estonia) Hannes Soomer	BMW M1000RR	TBD
