= 2026 Suzuka 8 Hours =

47th Suzuka 8 Hours motorcycle endurance race

- Round 3 of the 2026 FIM Endurance World Championship

Event information
- Date: 5 July 2026
- Location: Suzuka, Mie, Japan
- Venue: Suzuka Circuit
- Course length: 5.821 km (3.617 mi) (Note: Motorcycle races, including the Suzuka 8 Hours, use an alternate chicane configuration at Turn 12 (shown in grey).)

Pole position
- Time: 2:04.738
- Team: (Japan) Honda HRC
- Riders: (Japan) Takumi Takahashi (United Kingdom) Jonathan Rea (Thailand) Somkiat Chantra

Race results
- Laps completed: 188
- EWC Winning Team: (Japan) Honda HRC
- EWC Winning Riders: (Japan) Takumi Takahashi (United Kingdom) Jonathan Rea (Thailand) Somkiat Chantra
- SST Winning Team: (Japan) NCXX Racing with Riders Club
- SST Winning Riders: (Japan) Tetsuta Nagashima (Japan) Yudai Kamei (Japan) Yuta Date

The 47th Suzuka 8 Hours (Japanese: 鈴鹿8時間耐久ロードレース 第47回大会, Hepburn: Suzuka Hachijikan Taikyū Rōdo Rēsu Dai 47-kai Taikai) was a motorcycle endurance race, which took place on 3–5 July 2026 at the Suzuka Circuit in Japan. It marked the 47th running of the Suzuka 8 Hours since its inception in 1978, with the race having been cancelled only twice—in 2020 and 2021. The event also served as the third round of the 2026 FIM Endurance World Championship.

The race was sanctioned by the Fédération Internationale de Motocyclisme (FIM) as part of the 2026 Endurance World Championship, and jointly organized by Mobilityland Corporation, the Motorcycle Federation of Japan (MFJ), and Warner Bros. Discovery Sports, the championship's global promoter. The event has been sponsored by Coca-Cola in its official race title since 1984, making it one of the longest‑running title sponsorships in motorcycle racing.

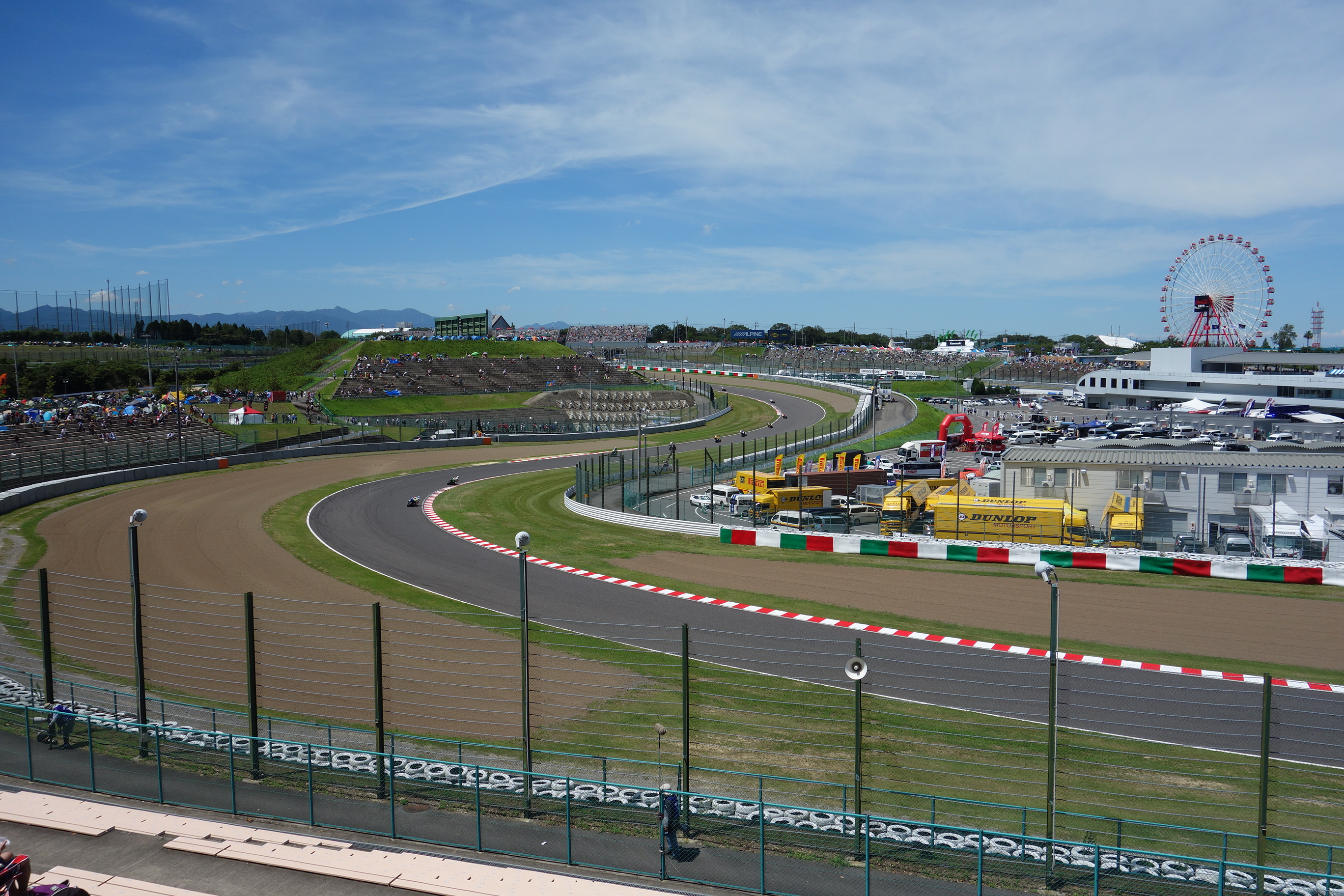
The Esses at Suzuka Circuit, seen from Turn 6.

== Entries ==
For the 2026 Suzuka 8 Hours, the traditional domestic tryout system—used by Japanese teams who were not part of the full-season EWC grid—was abolished in favor of a new selection committee process composed of Mobilityland Corporation, the Fédération Internationale de Motocyclisme (FIM), and the FIM EWC promoter. The maximum entry field was established at 60 teams, consisting of 20 seeded teams based on the 2025 results, and up to 20 teams selected through the new process. The first round of selection concluded on 12 December 2025 with ten teams earning entry rights. Final entry confirmations followed in additional selection rounds in early 2026.

SDG Ducati Team Kagayama and Balz & Advance MC with Fujiki Kogyo withdrew their entries in February despite having been automatically granted the seeded entry based on the 2025 results. In May, Team Kagayama made a statement where they announced their official participation withdrawal from the 8 Hours endurance race, explaining their intent to focus fully on their All Japan JSB1000 season.

Domestic entries
Entry type	Class	Team	Motorcycle
Seeded entry	EWC	(Japan) Honda HRC	Honda CBR1000RR-R SP
Seeded entry	EWC	(Japan) Yamaha Racing Team	Yamaha YZF-R1
Seeded entry	EWC	(Japan) SDG Team Harc-Pro Honda	Honda CBR1000RR-R
Seeded entry	EWC	(Japan) Team ATJ with docomo Business	Honda CBR1000RR-R SP
Seeded entry	EWC	(Japan) Honda Asia Dream Racing with Astemo	Honda CBR1000RR-R
Seeded entry	EWC	(Japan) Sanmei Team Taro Plusone with SDG	BMW M1000RR
Seeded entry	EWC	(Japan) Marumae Team Kodama	Yamaha YZF-R1
Seeded entry	EWC	(Japan) Honda Suzuka Racing Team	Honda CBR1000RR-R SP
Seeded entry	EWC	(Japan) Team BabyFace Titanium Power	Yamaha YZF-R1
Seeded entry	EWC	(Japan) Bakuon RPT Nagano & RT Matsunaga	Yamaha YZF-R1
Seeded entry	EWC	(Japan) Dog House & Tripoint Fuchs Silkolene	Suzuki GSX-R1000R
Seeded entry	EWC	Team Sugai Racing Japan	Honda CBR1000RR-R
Seeded entry	EWC	(Japan) Honda Dream RT Sakurai	Honda CBR1000RR-R
Seeded entry	SST	(Japan) Tone Team 4413 EVA 02 BMW	BMW M1000RR
Seeded entry	SST	(Japan) Honda Kumamoto Racing & Hamamatsu Escargot	Honda CBR1000RR-R SP
Seeded entry	SST	(Japan) Nichirin Racing	Yamaha YZF-R1 RN65
Seeded entry	SST	(Japan) Team38	Kawasaki ZX 10R
Selection – Round 1	EWC	(Japan) Astemo Pro Honda SI Racing	Honda CBR1000RR-R
Selection – Round 1	EWC	(Japan) Shinsyuren with Totec	BMW M1000RR
Selection – Round 1	EWC	(Japan) Team Frontier	BMW S1000RR
Selection – Round 1	EWC	(Japan) Honda Blue Helmets MSC Kumamoto & Asaka	Honda CBR1000RR-R
Selection – Round 1	EWC	(Japan) Team Matsunaga KDC Gears	Yamaha YZF-R1 RN65
Selection – Round 1	SST	(Japan) Team Tatara Aprilia	Aprilia RSV4
Selection – Round 1	SST	(Japan) NCXX Racing with Riders Club	Yamaha YZF-R1
Selection – Round 1	SST	(Japan) Kawasaki Plaza Racing Team	Kawasaki ZX 10R
Selection – Round 1	EXP	(Japan) Team Suzuki CN Challenge	Suzuki GSX-R1000R
Selection – Round 1	EXP	(Japan) Honda Tochigi Racing and Koyokai Dream RT	Honda CBR1000RR-R
Selection – Round 2	EWC	(Japan) KRP Sanyo Kogyoi & RS-Itoh	Kawasaki ZX 10R
Selection – Round 2	EWC	(Japan) S-Pulse Dream Racing	Suzuki GSX-R1000R
Selection – Round 2	EWC	(Japan) Verity & Fenice with Kirinjishi	Yamaha YZF-R1
Selection – Round 2	SST	(Japan) Moto Win Racing	Honda CBR1000RR-R
Selection – Round 2	SST	(Japan) Team Kohsaka & Takahon Racing	Honda CBR1000RR-R
Selection – Round 2	SST	(Japan) Motorcycles#27 EJ YIC	Honda CBR1000RR-R
Selection – Round 2	EXP	(Japan) Honda Hamamatsu Escargot RT	Honda CBR1000RR-R

=== Entry list ===
Icon	Class
EWC	Endurance World Championship
SST	Superstock
EXP	Experimental

No.	Class	Team	Motorcycle	Tyre	Blue	Yellow	Red
0	EXP	(Japan) Team Suzuki CN Challenge	Suzuki GSX-R1000R	B	(Japan) Takuya Tsuda	(Japan) Ryo Mizuno	(France) Étienne Masson
1	EWC	(Austria) YART Yamaha Official EWC Team	Yamaha YZF-R1	B	(Czech Republic) Karel Hanika	(Germany) Marvin Fritz	(Argentina) Leandro Mercado
3	EWC	(Japan) Sanmei Team Taro Plusone with SDG	BMW M1000RR	B	(Japan) Taro Sekiguchi	(Japan) Tatsuya Nakamura	(Japan) Keisuke Tanaka
4	EWC	(France) Tati Team AVA6 Racing	Honda CBR1000RR	P	(France) Hugo Clere	(France) Mike Di Meglio	(Spain) Isaac Viñales
5	EWC	(Japan) F.C.C. TSR Honda France	Honda CBR1000RR-R	B	(France) Alan Techer	(France) Corentin Perolari	(United Kingdom) John McPhee
6	EWC	(Germany) ERC Endurance #6	BMW M1000RR	D	(Germany) Marcel Schrötter	(France) Kenny Foray	(Germany) Jan-Ole Jähnig
8	EWC	Team Bolliger Switzerland #8	Kawasaki ZX-10R	P	(Austria) Nico Thöni	(Spain) Álex Toledo	(Spain) Xavier Artigas
11	EWC	(France) Kawasaki Webike Trickstar	Kawasaki ZX-10RR	B	(Spain) Román Ramos	(Italy) Christian Gamarino	(France) Grégory Leblanc
12	EWC	(Japan) Yoshimura SERT Motul	Suzuki GSX-R1000R	B	(France) Gregg Black	(United Kingdom) Dan Linfoot	(Japan) Cocoro Atsumi
17	EWC	(Japan) Astemo Pro Honda SI Racing	Honda CBR1000RR-R	B	(Japan) Kohta Nozane	(Japan) Taiga Hada	(Japan) Kohta Arakawa
19	SST	(Japan) Team Tatara Aprilia	Aprilia RSV4 1100 Factory	D	(Japan) Kazuki Watanabe	(Japan) Ruka Wada	(Japan) Akito Haga
20	EWC	(Japan) Honda Suzuka Racing Team	Honda CBR1000RR-R	B	(Canada) Ben Young	(Japan) Genki Nakajima	(Japan) Maiku Watanuki
21	EWC	(Japan) Yamaha Factory Racing Team	Yamaha YZF-R1	B	(Japan) Katsuyuki Nakasuga	(Australia) Jack Miller	(Italy) Andrea Locatelli
23	EWC	(Japan) KRP Sanyo Kogyo & RS-Itoh	Kawasaki ZX-10R	B	(Japan) Yuto Sano	(Japan) Katsuto Sano	(Japan) Akira Yanagawa (Note: Riku Sugawara was part of the original line-up but was injured during the test run and replaced by Yanagawa.)
25	SST	(Japan) Team Étoile	BMW M1000RR	D	(Japan) Hikari Okubo	(Japan) Motoharu Ito	(Japan) Kaito Toba
26	EWC	(Japan) Verity & Fenice with Kirinjishi	Yamaha YZF-R1	B	(Japan) Shota Yokoyama	(Japan) Mitsuhiro Kuno	(Japan) Minori Sato
29	EWC	(Japan) Dog House & Tripoint Fuchs Silkolene	Suzuki GSX-R1000R	D	(Japan) Keita Iwatani	(Japan) Eisuke Samura	(Japan) Toshiharu Oosuka
30	EWC	(Japan) Honda HRC	Honda CBR1000RR-R SP	B	(Japan) Takumi Takahashi	(United Kingdom) Jonathan Rea	(Thailand) Somkiat Chantra
31	EWC	Team Sugai Racing Japan	Honda CBR1000RR-R	B	(Japan) Yoshiyuki Sugai	(Japan) Yasuhiro Matsukawa	(Thailand) Varis Fleming
36	SST	(France) 3ART Best Of Bike Hamaguchi	Yamaha YZF-R1	D	(France) Lucas Mahias	(France) Loïc Arbel	(Switzerland) Robin Mulhauser
37	EWC	(Belgium) BMW Motorrad World Endurance Team	BMW M1000RR	B	(Germany) Markus Reiterberger	(South Africa) Steven Odendaal	(Netherlands) Michael van der Mark
38	SST	(Belgium) Champion-Hert Powered by MRP	BMW M1000RR	D	(Hungary) Bálint Kovács	(Germany) Jan Bühn	(Belgium) Loris Cresson
40	EWC	(Japan) Team ATJ with NTT Docomo Business	Honda CBR1000RR-R SP	B	(Japan) Satoru Iwata	(Japan) Kohki Suzuki	(Japan) Takuma Kunimine
41	SST	(France) Dafy Kaedear RAC41 Honda	Honda CBR1000RR-R SP	D	(Japan) Takeshi Ishizuka	(France) Diego Poncet	(Italy) Kevin Manfredi
43	SST	(Japan) Sanrio Character Honda Kumamoto Racing	Honda CBR1000RR-R	D	(Japan) Kazuhiro Kojima	(Japan) Yosuke Ide	(Japan) Toshiki Senda
45	EWC	(Japan) Shinsyuren with Totec	BMW M1000RR	B	(Japan) Hinata Nakajima	(Japan) Kyosuke Okuda	(Japan) Hisami Higashimura
46	SST	(Japan) Motorcycles #27 EJ YIC	Honda CBR1000RR-R SP	D	(Japan) Tsuna Nishinaka	(Japan) Atsushi Kawaguchi	(Japan) Takashi Maekawa
50	EWC	(Japan) Marumae Team Kodama	Yamaha YZF-R1	B	(Japan) Yuta Kodama	(Australia) Max Stauffer	(Japan) Takumi Takahashi
51	EXP	(Japan) Honda Hamamatsu Escargot RT with Dreamo	Honda CBR1000RR-R	D	(Japan) Takumi Fukuda	(Japan) Syuu Yamato	(Japan) Kai Aota
52	SST	(Japan) NCXX Racing with Riders Club	Honda CBR1000RR-R	D	(Japan) Tetsuta Nagashima	(Japan) Yudai Kamei	(Japan) Yuta Date
56	SST	(Japan) Team Kohsaka & Takahon Racing	Honda CBR1000RR-R SP	D	(Japan) Tatsuya Yamaguchi	(Japan) Rui Kusu	(Japan) Shogo Kawasaki
57	SST	(Japan) Himeji Nichirin Racing	Yamaha YZF-R1	D	(Japan) Masaki Adachi	(Japan) Sota Horii	(Japan) Motoaki Sawamura
58	SST	(Japan) Moto Win Racing	Honda CBR1000RR-R	D	(Japan) Keisuke Tsukahara	(Japan) Yutaka Murase	(Japan) Shingo Suzuki
59	EWC	(Japan) Team BabyFace Titanium Power	Yamaha YZF-R1	B	(Japan) Shota Ite	(Japan) Rei Matsuoka	(Japan) Kazuma Tsuda
64	SST	(Japan) Kawasaki Plaza Racing Team	Kawasaki ZX-10R	D	(Japan) Ryosuke Iwato	(Japan) Gun Mie	(Japan) Yosuke Nakayama
65	EWC	(Germany) Motobox Kremer Racing by 321	Yamaha YZF-R1	D	(Netherlands) Twan Smits	(Germany) Lennox Lehmann	(Germany) Dirk Geiger
71	EWC	(Japan) Team Sakurai Honda	Honda CBR1000RR-R	B	(Japan) Kazuki Ito	(Japan) Daijiro Hiura	(Japan) Ryusei Yamanaka
73	EWC	(Japan) SDG Team Harc-Pro Honda	Honda CBR1000RR-R	B	(Japan) Yuki Kunii	(Japan) Teppei Nagoe	(Japan) Keito Abe
76	EWC	(Japan) AutoRace Ube Racing Team	BMW M1000RR	B	(Japan) Naomichi Uramoto	(France) Sylvain Guintoli	(Estonia) Hannes Soomer
77	SST	(Poland) Wójcik Racing Team #77 SST	Honda CBR1000RR-R SP	D	(Spain) Óscar Gutierrez	(Spain) Jordi Torres	(Italy) Gabriel Giannini
78	EWC	(Japan) Honda Blue Helmets MSC Kumamoto & Asaka	Honda CBR1000RR-R	D	(Japan) Hiromasa Okada	(Japan) Kei Tomie	(Japan) Aki Ito
83	SST	(Japan) Team38	Kawasaki ZX-10R	D	(Japan) Junpei Takatani	(Japan) Yoshiaki Nojima	(Japan) Seiichiro Morimoto
88	EWC	(Japan) Honda Asia Dream Racing with Astemo	Honda CBR1000RR-R	B	(Thailand) Nakarin Atiratphuvapat	(Malaysia) Khairul Idham Pawi	(Indonesia) Adenanta Putra
93	SST	(Japan) Tone Team4413 BMW	BMW M1000RR	D	(Japan) Tomoya Hoshino	(Hungary) Máté Számadó	(Japan) Kengo Nagao (Note: Nagao was injured during qualifying and was replaced by Ainosuke Yoshida for the remainder of the weekend.)
95	EWC	(Japan) S-Pulse Dream Racing Suzuki	Suzuki GSX-R1000R	B	(Japan) Sho Nishimura	(Germany) Jonas Folger	(France) Jérémy Guarnoni
99	EWC	(Belgium) Elf Marc VDS Racing Team KM99	Yamaha YZF-R1	B	(France) Randy de Puniet	(France) Florian Marino	(Italy) Alessandro Delbianco
111	EWC	(Japan) Team Matsunaga KDC x Gears	Yamaha YZF-R1	B	(Japan) Takumi Hane	(Japan) Takatsugu Sakai	(Japan) Masahiko Arakawa
112	EXP	(Japan) Honda Tochigi Racing & Kouyoukai Dream Racing Team	Honda CBR1000RR-R	D	(Japan) Naoki Takahashi	(Japan) Takafumi Kato	(Malaysia) Helmi Azman
711	EWC	(Japan) Bakuon Team Nagano	Yamaha YZF-R1	B	(Japan) Shigenori Sakurayama	(Japan) Yuki Ito	(Japan) Ren Okabe
828	EWC	(Japan) Team Frontier	BMW S1000RR	D	(Malaysia) Azlan Shah	(Japan) Ryosuke Katahira	(Japan) Sho Hasegawa

== Qualifying ==
=== Qualifying results ===
Overall ranking of qualifications are based on the average of the two best times per team. Averages in bold indicate fastest times of each class. Honda HRC's Jonathan Rea set the fastest individual lap time during the second qualifying session, with a 2:04.422.

Pos.	No.	Class	Team	Motorcycle	Average
1	30	EWC	(Japan) Honda HRC	Honda CBR1000RR-R SP	**2:04.738**
2	37	EWC	(Belgium) BMW Motorrad World Endurance Team	BMW M1000RR	2:04.813
3	99	EWC	(Belgium) Elf Marc VDS Racing Team KM99	Yamaha YZF-R1	2:04.960
4	1	EWC	(Austria) YART Yamaha Official EWC Team	Yamaha YZF-R1	2:05.169
5	21	EWC	(Japan) Yamaha Factory Racing Team	Yamaha YZF-R1	2:05.196
6	5	EWC	(Japan) F.C.C. TSR Honda France	Honda CBR1000RR-R	2:05.321
7	17	EWC	(Japan) Astemo Pro Honda SI Racing	Honda CBR1000RR-R	2:05.323
8	12	EWC	(Japan) Yoshimura SERT Motul	Suzuki GSX-R1000R	2:05.359
9	76	EWC	(Japan) AutoRace Ube Racing Team	BMW M1000RR	2:05.461
10	73	EWC	(Japan) SDG Team Harc-Pro Honda	Honda CBR1000RR-R	2:05.851
11	71	EWC	(Japan) Team Sakurai Honda	Honda CBR1000RR-R	2:05.892
12	40	EWC	(Japan) Team ATJ with NTT Docomo Business	Honda CBR1000RR-R SP	2:05.898
13	0	EXP	(Japan) Team Suzuki CN Challenge	Suzuki GSX-R1000R	**2:05.924**
14	11	EWC	(France) Kawasaki Webike Trickstar	Kawasaki ZX-10RR	2:06.007
15	25	SST	(Japan) Team Étoile	BMW M1000RR	**2:06.209**
16	95	EWC	(Japan) S-Pulse Dream Racing Suzuki	Suzuki GSX-R1000R	2:06.397
17	6	EWC	(Germany) ERC Endurance #6	BMW M1000RR	2:06.496
18	50	EWC	(Japan) Marumae Team Kodama	Yamaha YZF-R1	2:06.576
19	59	EWC	(Japan) Team BabyFace Titanium Power	Yamaha YZF-R1	2:06.598
20	88	EWC	(Japan) Honda Asia Dream Racing with Astemo	Honda CBR1000RR-R	2:06.709
21	52	SST	(Japan) NCXX Racing with Riders Club	Honda CBR1000RR-R	2:07.110
22	3	EWC	(Japan) Sanmei Team Taro Plusone with SDG	BMW M1000RR	2:07.150
23	19	SST	(Japan) Team Tatara Aprilia	Aprilia RSV4 1100 Factory	2:07.465
24	64	SST	(Japan) Kawasaki Plaza Racing Team	Kawasaki ZX-10RR	2:07.527
25	41	SST	(France) Dafy Kaedear RAC41 Honda	Honda CBR1000RR-R SP	2:07.772
26	8	EWC	Team Bolliger Switzerland #8	Kawasaki ZX-10RR	2:07.927
27	36	SST	(France) 3ART Best Of Bike Hamaguchi	Yamaha YZF-R1	2:08.029
28	4	EWC	(France) Tati Team AVA6 Racing	Honda CBR1000RR	2:08.094
29	65	EWC	(Germany) Motobox Kremer Racing by 321	Yamaha YZF-R1	2:08.160
30	23	EWC	(Japan) KRP Sanyo Kogyo & RS-Itoh	Kawasaki ZX-10R	2:08.191
31	20	EWC	(Japan) Honda Suzuka Racing Team	Honda CBR1000RR-R	2:08.301
32	77	SST	(Poland) Wójcik Racing Team #77 SST	Honda CBR1000RR-R SP	2:08.356
33	711	EWC	(Japan) Bakuon Team Nagano	Yamaha YZF-R1	2:08.455
34	112	EXP	(Japan) Honda Tochigi Racing & Kouyoukai Dream Racing Team	Honda CBR1000RR-R	2:08.463
35	38	SST	(Belgium) Champion-Hert Powered by MRP	BMW M1000RR	2:09.069
36	45	EWC	(Japan) Shinsyuren with Totec	BMW M1000RR	2:09.073
37	93	SST	(Japan) Tone Team4413 BMW	BMW M1000RR	2:09.090
38	43	SST	(Japan) Sanrio Character Honda Kumamoto Racing	Honda CBR1000RR-R	2:09.683
39	51	EXP	(Japan) Honda Hamamatsu Escargot RT with Dreamo	Honda CBR1000RR-R	2:10.009
40	56	SST	(Japan) Team Kohsaka & Takahon Racing	Honda CBR1000RR-R SP	2:10.258
41	26	EWC	(Japan) Verity & Fenice with Kirinjishi	Yamaha YZF-R1	2:10.450
42	828	EWC	(Japan) Team Frontier	BMW S1000RR	2:10.565
43	57	SST	(Japan) Himeji Nichirin Racing	Yamaha YZF-R1	2:10.961
44	111	EWC	(Japan) Team Matsunaga KDC x Gears	Yamaha YZF-R1	2:11.838
45	31	EWC	Team Sugai Racing Japan	Honda CBR1000RR-R	2:11.898
46	78	EWC	(Japan) Honda Blue Helmets MSC Kumamoto & Asaka	Honda CBR1000RR-R	2:12.492
47	58	SST	(Japan) Moto Win Racing	Honda CBR1000RR-R	2:12.494
48	83	SST	(Japan) Team38	Kawasaki ZX-10R	2:12.559
49	29	EWC	(Japan) Dog House & Tripoint Fuchs Silkolene	Suzuki GSX-R1000R	2:13.665
50	46	SST	(Japan) Motorcycles #27 EJ YIC	Honda CBR1000RR-R SP	2:13.885

== Top 10 Trial ==
The Top 10 Trial was cancelled due to heavy rainfall—grid positions were based on Friday's qualifying.

== Race ==
=== Race results ===
Pos.	No.	Class	Team	Riders	Motorcycle	Tyre	Time
1	30	EWC	(Japan) Honda HRC	(Japan) Takumi Takahashi (United Kingdom) Jonathan Rea (Thailand) Somkiat Chantra (Note: Chantra did not complete any laps in the race despite being available.)	Honda CBR1000RR-R SP	B	7:54:19.425
2	21	EWC	(Japan) Yamaha Factory Racing Team	(Japan) Katsuyuki Nakasuga (Australia) Jack Miller (Italy) Andrea Locatelli	Yamaha YZF-R1	B	+1:34.280
3	37	EWC	(Belgium) BMW Motorrad World Endurance Team	(Germany) Markus Reiterberger (South Africa) Steven Odendaal (Netherlands) Michael van der Mark	BMW M1000RR	B	+1:44.087
4	1	EWC	(Austria) YART Yamaha Official EWC Team	(Czech Republic) Karel Hanika (Germany) Marvin Fritz (Argentina) Leandro Mercado	Yamaha YZF-R1	B	+3:44.444
5	76	EWC	(Japan) AutoRace Ube Racing Team	(Japan) Naomichi Uramoto (France) Sylvain Guintoli (France) Christophe Ponsson	BMW M1000RR	B	+3:46.113
6	12	EWC	(Japan) Yoshimura SERT Motul	(France) Gregg Black (United Kingdom) Dan Linfoot (Japan) Cocoro Atsumi	Suzuki GSX-R1000R	B	+2 laps
7	0	EXP	(Japan) Team Suzuki CN Challenge	(Japan) Takuya Tsuda (Japan) Ryo Mizuno (France) Étienne Masson	Suzuki GSX-R1000R	B	+2 laps
8	73	EWC	(Japan) SDG Team Harc-Pro Honda	(Japan) Yuki Kunii (Japan) Teppei Nagoe (Japan) Keito Abe	Honda CBR1000RR-R	B	+3 laps
9	88	EWC	(Japan) Honda Asia Dream Racing with Astemo	(Thailand) Nakarin Atiratphuvapat (Malaysia) Khairul Idham Pawi (Indonesia) Adenanta Putra	Honda CBR1000RR-R	B	+3 laps
10	40	EWC	(Japan) Team ATJ with NTT Docomo Business	(Japan) Satoru Iwata (Japan) Kohki Suzuki (Japan) Takuma Kunimine	Honda CBR1000RR-R SP	B	+4 laps
11	95	EWC	(Japan) S-Pulse Dream Racing Suzuki	(Japan) Sho Nishimura (Germany) Jonas Folger (France) Jérémy Guarnoni	Suzuki GSX-R1000R	B	+5 laps
12	50	EWC	(Japan) Marumae Team Kodama	(Japan) Yuta Kodama (Australia) Max Stauffer (Japan) Takumi Takahashi	Yamaha YZF-R1	B	+5 laps
13	11	EWC	(France) Kawasaki Webike Trickstar	(Spain) Román Ramos (Italy) Christian Gamarino (France) Grégory Leblanc	Kawasaki ZX-10RR	B	+6 laps
14	52	SST	(Japan) NCXX Racing with Riders Club	(Japan) Tetsuta Nagashima (Japan) Yudai Kamei (Japan) Yuta Date	Honda CBR1000RR-R	D	+7 laps
15	25	SST	(Japan) Team Étoile	(Japan) Hikari Okubo (Japan) Motoharu Ito (Japan) Kaito Toba	BMW M1000RR	D	+7 laps
16	77	SST	(Poland) Wójcik Racing Team #77 SST	(Spain) Óscar Gutiérrez (Spain) Jordi Torres (Italy) Gabriel Giannini	Honda CBR1000RR-R SP	D	+7 laps
17	38	SST	(Belgium) Champion-Hert Powered by MRP	(Hungary) Bálint Kovács (Germany) Jan Bühn (Belgium) Loris Cresson	BMW M1000RR	D	+7 laps
18	65	EWC	(Germany) Motobox Kremer Racing by 321	(Netherlands) Twan Smits (Germany) Dirk Geiger	Yamaha YZF-R1	D	+8 laps
19	23	EWC	(Japan) KRP Sanyo Kogyo & RS-Itoh	(Japan) Yuto Sano (Japan) Katsuto Sano (Japan) Akira Yanagawa	Kawasaki ZX-10R	B	+8 laps
20	17	EWC	(Japan) Astemo Pro Honda SI Racing	(Japan) Kohta Nozane (Japan) Taiga Hada (Japan) Kohta Arakawa	Honda CBR1000RR-R	B	+9 laps
21	8	EWC	Team Bolliger Switzerland #8	(Austria) Nico Thöni (Spain) Álex Toledo (Spain) Xavier Artigas	Kawasaki ZX-10R	P	+9 laps
22	6	EWC	(Germany) ERC Endurance #6	(Germany) Marcel Schrötter (France) Kenny Foray (Germany) Jan-Ole Jähnig	BMW M1000RR	D	+9 laps
23	20	EWC	(Japan) Honda Suzuka Racing Team	(Canada) Ben Young (Japan) Genki Nakajima (Japan) Maiku Watanuki	Honda CBR1000RR-R	B	+9 laps
24	45	EWC	(Japan) Shinsyuren with Totec	(Japan) Hinata Nakajima (Japan) Kyosuke Okuda (Japan) Hisami Higashimura	BMW M1000RR	B	+10 laps
25	51	EXP	(Japan) Honda Hamamatsu Escargot RT with Dreamo	(Japan) Takumi Fukuda (Japan) Syuu Yamato (Japan) Kai Aota	Honda CBR1000RR-R	D	+11 laps
26	5	EWC	(Japan) F.C.C. TSR Honda France	(France) Alan Techer (France) Corentin Perolari (United Kingdom) John McPhee	Honda CBR1000RR-R	B	+12 laps
27	64	SST	(Japan) Kawasaki Plaza Racing Team	(Japan) Ryosuke Iwato (Japan) Gun Mie (Japan) Yosuke Nakayama	Kawasaki ZX-10R	D	+12 laps
28	83	SST	(Japan) Team38	(Japan) Junpei Takatani (Japan) Yoshiaki Nojima (Japan) Seiichiro Morimoto	Kawasaki ZX-10R	D	+13 laps
29	111	EWC	(Japan) Team Matsunaga KDC x Gears	(Japan) Takumi Hane (Japan) Takatsugu Sakai (Japan) Masahiko Arakawa	Yamaha YZF-R1	B	+14 laps
30	99	EWC	(Belgium) Elf Marc VDS Racing Team KM99	(France) Randy de Puniet (France) Florian Marino (Italy) Alessandro Delbianco	Yamaha YZF-R1	B	+15 laps
31	41	SST	(France) Dafy Kaedear RAC41 Honda	(Japan) Takeshi Ishizuka (France) Diego Poncet (Italy) Kevin Manfredi	Honda CBR1000RR-R SP	D	+15 laps
32	58	SST	(Japan) Moto Win Racing	(Japan) Keisuke Tsukahara (Japan) Yutaka Murase (Japan) Shingo Suzuki	Honda CBR1000RR-R	D	+16 laps
33	43	SST	(Japan) Sanrio Character Honda Kumamoto Racing	(Japan) Kazuhiro Kojima (Japan) Yosuke Ide (Japan) Toshiki Senda	Honda CBR1000RR-R	D	+17 laps
34	26	EWC	(Japan) Verity & Fenice with Kirinjishi	(Japan) Shota Yokoyama (Japan) Mitsuhiro Kuno (Japan) Minori Sato	Yamaha YZF-R1	B	+17 laps
35	78	EWC	(Japan) Honda Blue Helmets MSC Kumamoto & Asaka	(Japan) Hiromasa Okada (Japan) Kei Tomie (Japan) Aki Ito	Honda CBR1000RR-R	D	+17 laps
36	19	SST	(Japan) Team Tatara Aprilia	(Japan) Kazuki Watanabe (Japan) Ruka Wada (Japan) Akito Haga	Aprilia RSV4 1100 Factory	D	+17 laps
37	711	EWC	(Japan) Bakuon Team Nagano	(Japan) Shigenori Sakurayama (Japan) Yuki Ito (Japan) Ren Okabe	Yamaha YZF-R1	B	+18 laps
38	57	SST	(Japan) Himeji Nichirin Racing	(Japan) Masaki Adachi (Japan) Sota Horii (Japan) Motoaki Sawamura	Yamaha YZF-R1	D	+20 laps
39	31	EWC	Team Sugai Racing Japan	(Japan) Yoshiyuki Sugai (Japan) Yasuhiro Matsukawa (Thailand) Varis Fleming	Honda CBR1000RR-R	B	+21 laps
40	112	EXP	(Japan) Honda Tochigi Racing & Kouyoukai Dream Racing Team	(Japan) Naoki Takahashi (Japan) Takafumi Kato (Malaysia) Helmi Azman	Honda CBR1000RR-R	D	+22 laps
41	56	SST	(Japan) Team Kohsaka & Takahon Racing	(Japan) Tatsuya Yamaguchi (Japan) Rui Kusu (Japan) Shogo Kawasaki	Honda CBR1000RR-R SP	D	+23 laps
42	46	SST	(Japan) Motorcycles #27 EJ YIC	(Japan) Tsuna Nishinaka (Japan) Atsushi Kawaguchi (Japan) Takashi Maekawa	Honda CBR1000RR-R SP	D	+24 laps
43	3	EWC	(Japan) Sanmei Team Taro Plusone with SDG	(Japan) Taro Sekiguchi (Japan) Tatsuya Nakamura (Japan) Keisuke Tanaka	BMW M1000RR	B	+26 laps
44	36	SST	(France) 3ART Best Of Bike Hamaguchi	(France) Lucas Mahias (France) Loïc Arbel (Switzerland) Robin Mulhauser	Yamaha YZF-R1	D	+27 laps
45	93	SST	(Japan) Tone Team4413 BMW	(Japan) Tomoya Hoshino (Japan) Ainosuke Yoshida	BMW M1000RR	D	+40 laps
46	828	EWC	(Japan) Team Frontier	(Malaysia) Azlan Shah (Japan) Ryosuke Katahira (Japan) Sho Hasegawa	BMW S1000RR	D	+47 laps
NC	29	EWC	(Japan) Dog House & Tripoint Fuchs Silkolene	(Japan) Keita Iwatani (Japan) Eisuke Samura (Japan) Toshiharu Oosuka	Suzuki GSX-R1000R	D	+62 laps
NC	71	EWC	(Japan) Team Sakurai Honda	(Japan) Kazuki Ito (Japan) Daijiro Hiura (Japan) Ryusei Yamanaka	Honda CBR1000RR-R	B	+77 laps
Ret	59	EWC	(Japan) Team BabyFace Titanium Power	(Japan) Shota Ite (Japan) Rei Matsuoka (Japan) Kazuma Tsuda	Yamaha YZF-R1	B	Accident damage
Ret	4	EWC	(France) Tati Team AVA6 Racing	(France) Hugo Clere (France) Mike Di Meglio (Spain) Isaac Viñales	Honda CBR1000RR	P	Engine
