= 2022 Supersport World Championship =

Twenty-sixth season of the Supersport World Championship

2022 Supersport World Championship
Previous:	2021	Next:	2023
Support series: Superbike World Championship; Supersport 300 World Championship; Yamaha R3 bLU cRU World Cup

The 2022 Supersport World Championship was the twenty-sixth season of the Supersport World Championship, the twenty-fourth held under this name. The championship was won by Dominique Aegerter at the Mandalika round.

== Race calendar and results ==
The provisional 2022 season calendar was announced on 25 November 2021.

2022 calendar
Round		Country	Circuit	Date	Superpole	Fastest lap	Winning rider	Winning team	Winning constructor	Ref
1	R1	Spain	MotorLand Aragón	9 April	(Italy) Lorenzo Baldassarri	(Switzerland) Dominique Aegerter	(Italy) Lorenzo Baldassarri	Evan Bros. WorldSSP Yamaha Team	(Japan) Yamaha	
1	R2	Spain	MotorLand Aragón	10 April	(Italy) Lorenzo Baldassarri	(Switzerland) Dominique Aegerter	(Switzerland) Dominique Aegerter	Ten Kate Racing Yamaha	(Japan) Yamaha	
2	R1	Netherlands	TT Circuit Assen	23 April	(Switzerland) Dominique Aegerter	(Switzerland) Dominique Aegerter	(Switzerland) Dominique Aegerter	Ten Kate Racing Yamaha	(Japan) Yamaha	
2	R2	Netherlands	TT Circuit Assen	24 April	(Switzerland) Dominique Aegerter	(Switzerland) Dominique Aegerter	(Switzerland) Dominique Aegerter	Ten Kate Racing Yamaha	(Japan) Yamaha	
3	R1	Portugal	Circuito do Estoril	21 May	(Switzerland) Dominique Aegerter	(Switzerland) Dominique Aegerter	(Switzerland) Dominique Aegerter	Ten Kate Racing Yamaha	(Japan) Yamaha	
3	R2	Portugal	Circuito do Estoril	22 May	(Switzerland) Dominique Aegerter	(Switzerland) Dominique Aegerter	(Switzerland) Dominique Aegerter	Ten Kate Racing Yamaha	(Japan) Yamaha	
4	R1	Italy	Misano World Circuit Marco Simoncelli	11 June	(Switzerland) Dominique Aegerter	(Italy) Nicolò Bulega	(Switzerland) Dominique Aegerter	Ten Kate Racing Yamaha	(Japan) Yamaha	
4	R2	Italy	Misano World Circuit Marco Simoncelli	12 June	(Switzerland) Dominique Aegerter	(Italy) Nicolò Bulega	(Switzerland) Dominique Aegerter	Ten Kate Racing Yamaha	(Japan) Yamaha	
5	R1	United Kingdom	Donington Park	16 July	(Switzerland) Dominique Aegerter	(Italy) Lorenzo Baldassarri	(Switzerland) Dominique Aegerter	Ten Kate Racing Yamaha	(Japan) Yamaha	
5	R2	United Kingdom	Donington Park	17 July	(Switzerland) Dominique Aegerter	(Switzerland) Dominique Aegerter	(Switzerland) Dominique Aegerter	Ten Kate Racing Yamaha	(Japan) Yamaha	
6	R1	Czech Republic	Autodrom Most	30 July	(Italy) Lorenzo Baldassarri	(Italy) Lorenzo Baldassarri	(Italy) Lorenzo Baldassarri	Evan Bros. WorldSSP Yamaha Team	(Japan) Yamaha	
6	R2	Czech Republic	Autodrom Most	31 July	(Italy) Lorenzo Baldassarri	(Italy) Stefano Manzi	(Italy) Lorenzo Baldassarri	Evan Bros. WorldSSP Yamaha Team	(Japan) Yamaha	
7	R1	France	Circuit de Nevers Magny-Cours	10 September	(Italy) Federico Caricasulo	(Switzerland) Dominique Aegerter	(Italy) Lorenzo Baldassarri	Evan Bros. WorldSSP Yamaha Team	(Japan) Yamaha	
7	R2	France	Circuit de Nevers Magny-Cours	11 September	(Italy) Federico Caricasulo	(Italy) Lorenzo Baldassarri	(Switzerland) Dominique Aegerter	Ten Kate Racing Yamaha	(Japan) Yamaha	
8	R1	Spain	Circuit de Barcelona-Catalunya	24 September	(Switzerland) Dominique Aegerter	(Switzerland) Dominique Aegerter	(Switzerland) Dominique Aegerter	Ten Kate Racing Yamaha	(Japan) Yamaha	
8	R2	Spain	Circuit de Barcelona-Catalunya	25 September	(Switzerland) Dominique Aegerter	(Switzerland) Dominique Aegerter	(Switzerland) Dominique Aegerter	Ten Kate Racing Yamaha	(Japan) Yamaha	
9	R1	Portugal	Algarve International Circuit	8 October	(Switzerland) Dominique Aegerter	(Italy) Lorenzo Baldassarri	(Italy) Stefano Manzi	Dynavolt Triumph	(United Kingdom) Triumph	
9	R2	Portugal	Algarve International Circuit	9 October	(Switzerland) Dominique Aegerter	(Italy) Raffaele De Rosa	(Switzerland) Dominique Aegerter	Ten Kate Racing Yamaha	(Japan) Yamaha	
10	R1	Argentina	Circuito San Juan Villicum	22 October	(Switzerland) Dominique Aegerter	(Italy) Raffaele De Rosa	(Switzerland) Dominique Aegerter	Ten Kate Racing Yamaha	(Japan) Yamaha	
10	R2	Argentina	Circuito San Juan Villicum	23 October	(Switzerland) Dominique Aegerter	(Switzerland) Dominique Aegerter	(Switzerland) Dominique Aegerter	Ten Kate Racing Yamaha	(Japan) Yamaha	
11	R1	Indonesia	Pertamina Mandalika International Street Circuit	12 November	(Finland) Niki Tuuli	(Turkey) Can Öncü	(Finland) Niki Tuuli	MV Agusta Reparto Corse	(Italy) MV Agusta	
11	R2	Indonesia	Pertamina Mandalika International Street Circuit	13 November	(Finland) Niki Tuuli	(Switzerland) Dominique Aegerter	(Switzerland) Dominique Aegerter	Ten Kate Racing Yamaha	(Japan) Yamaha	
12	R1	Australia	Phillip Island Grand Prix Circuit	19 November	(Italy) Federico Caricasulo	(Italy) Nicolò Bulega	(Italy) Yari Montella	Kawasaki Puccetti Racing	(Japan) Kawasaki	
12	R2	Australia	Phillip Island Grand Prix Circuit	20 November	(Italy) Federico Caricasulo	(Italy) Federico Caricasulo	(Switzerland) Dominique Aegerter	Ten Kate Racing Yamaha	(Japan) Yamaha	

== Regulation changes ==
Following a large overhaul of rules allowing larger-capacity engines, some new manufacturers and models will be eligible. Ducati will return to the series with their Panigale V-twin, two MV models and Triumph three cylinders will rejoin the series with the Street Triple RS, to combat the dominance of Japanese manufacturers Yamaha and Kawasaki.

== Entry list ==
2022 entry list
Team	Constructor	Motorcycle	No.	Rider	Class	Rounds
Orelac Racing VerdNatura WorldSSP	Ducati	Panigale V2	3	(Italy) Raffaele De Rosa		All
ColinAppleyard/Macadam–Yamaha	Yamaha	YZF-R6	4	(United Kingdom) Harry Truelove		5
Motozoo Racing by Puccetti	Kawasaki	ZX-6R	6	(Netherlands) Jeffrey Buis	C	1–9
Motozoo Racing by Puccetti	Kawasaki	ZX-6R	15	(Republic of Ireland) Eugene McManus		1–2
Motozoo Racing by Puccetti	Kawasaki	ZX-6R	21	(Australia) Benjamin Currie		3–9
Motozoo Racing by Puccetti	Kawasaki	ZX-6R	69	(United Kingdom) Tom Booth-Amos		10–12
Evan Bros. WorldSSP Yamaha Team	Yamaha	YZF-R6	7	(Italy) Lorenzo Baldassarri		All
Evan Bros. WorldSSP Yamaha Team	Yamaha	YZF-R6	56	(Hungary) Péter Sebestyén		All
Kallio Racing	Yamaha	YZF-R6	9	(Denmark) Simon Jespersen		3, 11–12 (Note: Patrick Hobelsberger competed in the first Friday practice session during round 3, before being replaced on Saturday by Simon Jespersen.)
Kallio Racing	Yamaha	YZF-R6	9	(Denmark) Simon Jespersen	C	7–9
Kallio Racing	Yamaha	YZF-R6	36	(Netherlands) Sander Kroeze	C	3–5
Kallio Racing	Yamaha	YZF-R6	44	(South Africa) Steven Odendaal	C	6
Kallio Racing	Yamaha	YZF-R6	52	(Germany) Patrick Hobelsberger		1–10
Kallio Racing	Yamaha	YZF-R6	88	(Italy) Alessandro Zetti	C	1–2
CM Racing	Ducati	Panigale V2	9	(Denmark) Simon Jespersen		5
CM Racing	Ducati	Panigale V2	73	(Austria) Maximilian Kofler		1–9
CM Racing	Ducati	Panigale V2	91	(San Marino) Luca Bernardi		10–12
MS Racing Yamaha WorldSSP	Yamaha	YZF-R6	10	(Spain) Unai Orradre		1–8, 11–12
MS Racing Yamaha WorldSSP	Yamaha	YZF-R6	50	(Czech Republic) Ondřej Vostatek		All
MS Racing Yamaha WorldSSP	Yamaha	YZF-R6	72	(Switzerland) Baris Sahin		10
MS Racing Yamaha WorldSSP	Yamaha	YZF-R6	83	(Brazil) Meikon Kawakami		9
Aruba.it Racing WorldSSP Team	Ducati	Panigale V2	11	(Italy) Nicolò Bulega		All
D34G Racing	Ducati	Panigale V2	12	(Italy) Filippo Fuligni	C	1–3
D34G Racing	Ducati	Panigale V2	22	(Italy) Federico Fuligni	C	1–9
D34G Racing	Ducati	Panigale V2	23	(Spain) Isaac Viñales	C	5–9
D34G Racing	Ducati	Panigale V2	29	(Italy) Nicholas Spinelli	C	4
Altogo Racing Team	Yamaha	YZF-R6	13	(Italy) Luca Ottaviani		3–4
GMT94 Yamaha	Yamaha	YZF-R6	16	(France) Jules Cluzel		1–5, 7–12
GMT94 Yamaha	Yamaha	YZF-R6	42	(France) Matthieu Grégorio		7
GMT94 Yamaha	Yamaha	YZF-R6	53	(France) Valentin Debise		6
GMT94 Yamaha	Yamaha	YZF-R6	53	(France) Valentin Debise		7
GMT94 Yamaha	Yamaha	YZF-R6	94	(France) Andy Verdoïa		All
VFT Racing	Yamaha	YZF-R6	17	(United Kingdom) Kyle Smith		1–7
VFT Racing	Yamaha	YZF-R6	25	(Switzerland) Marcel Brenner	C	1–9
VFT Racing	Yamaha	YZF-R6	25	(Switzerland) Marcel Brenner		10–12
VFT Racing	Yamaha	YZF-R6	47	(France) Johan Gimbert		9
VFT Racing	Yamaha	YZF-R6	70	(Spain) Marc Alcoba		8
I+Dent Racing Team	Yamaha	YZF-R6	19	(Spain) Joan Díaz Corbella		9
Ten Kate Racing Yamaha	Yamaha	YZF-R6	24	(Italy) Leonardo Taccini		1–9, 11–12
Ten Kate Racing Yamaha	Yamaha	YZF-R6	57	(United Kingdom) Bradley Smith		10
Ten Kate Racing Yamaha	Yamaha	YZF-R6	77	(Switzerland) Dominique Aegerter		All
MV Agusta Reparto Corse	MV Agusta	F3 800 RR	27	(Italy) Mattia Casadei		4–5
MV Agusta Reparto Corse	MV Agusta	F3 800 RR	54	(Turkey) Bahattin Sofuoğlu	C	1–9
MV Agusta Reparto Corse	MV Agusta	F3 800 RR	66	(Finland) Niki Tuuli		1–3, 6–12
MV Agusta Reparto Corse	MV Agusta	F3 800 RR	92	(Germany) Marcel Schrötter		12
EAB Racing Team	Yamaha	YZF-R6	28	(Netherlands) Glenn van Straalen		All
Barni Spark Racing Team	Ducati	Panigale V2	32	(Australia) Oli Bayliss		All
Dynavolt Triumph	Triumph	Street Triple RS	38	(Estonia) Hannes Soomer		All
Dynavolt Triumph	Triumph	Street Triple RS	62	(Italy) Stefano Manzi		All
Kawasaki Puccetti Racing	Kawasaki	ZX-6R	55	(Italy) Yari Montella		All
Kawasaki Puccetti Racing	Kawasaki	ZX-6R	61	(Turkey) Can Öncü		All
Althea Racing	Ducati	Panigale V2	64	(Italy) Federico Caricasulo		All
Prodina Racing WorldSSP	Kawasaki	ZX-6R	69	(United Kingdom) Tom Booth-Amos	C	1–9
YART–Yamaha WorldSSP	Yamaha	YZF-R6	71	(Australia) Tom Edwards		2–3, 9
MPM Routz Racing	Yamaha	YZF-R6	74	(Netherlands) Jaimie van Sikkelerus		2
Válvulas Arco JG76 Team	Ducati	Panigale V2	76	(Spain) Julián Giral		8
Andotrans Team Torrentó	Yamaha	YZF-R6	81	(Spain) Aleix Viu		8
Motoriders	Yamaha	YZF-R6	89	(Czech Republic) Patrik Homola		6
Renzi Corse	Ducati	Panigale V2	90	(Italy) Matteo Patacca		4
MTM Kawasaki	Kawasaki	ZX-6R	99	(Spain) Adrián Huertas		All

Key
Regular rider
Wildcard rider
Replacement rider
C WorldSSP Challenge

=== Rider changes ===
- After leaving the Superbike World Championship in 2020, Althea Racing returned in the Supersport World Championship, with the Italian Federico Caricasulo.
- Aruba.it Racing - Ducati joined the Supersport World Championship with Nicolò Bulega, who left Moto2.
- Barni Racing Team expanded into the Supersport World Championship, racing with the Australian Oli Bayliss.
- CM Racing raced with Maximilian Kofler, who moved from Moto3 and replaced Luca Bernardi, who moved up to the Superbike World Championship.
- Motozoo Racing raced with an all-new line up with Jeffrey Buis and Benjamin Currie, replacing Shogo Kawasaki and Michel Fabrizio.
- Patrick Hobelsberger joined Kallio Racing.
- Yari Montella joined Kawasaki Puccetti Racing with Can Öncü, replacing Philipp Öttl, who moved to the Superbike World Championship.
- 2021 Supersport 300 World Champion Adrián Huertas joined the Supersport World Championship with MTM Kawasaki.
- PTR Racing announced its return to the World Supersport grid with a brand new Triumph Street Triple 765 RS and rebranded as Dynavolt Triumph, fielding Hannes Soomer and Stefano Manzi
- Leonardo Taccini joined Ten Kate Racing Yamaha and replaced Galang Hendra Pratama who moved to the ARRC Supersport 600 class.

== Championship standings ==
Points

Position	**1st**	**2nd**	**3rd**	**4th**	**5th**	**6th**	**7th**	**8th**	**9th**	**10th**	**11th**	**12th**	**13th**	**14th**	**15th**
Points	25	20	16	13	11	10	9	8	7	6	5	4	3	2	1

=== Riders' championship ===
Pos.	Rider	Bike	ARA (Spain)		ASS (Netherlands)		EST (Portugal)		MIS (Italy)		DON (United Kingdom)		MOS (Czech Republic)		MAG (France)		BAR (Spain)		POR (Portugal)		VIL (Argentina)		MAN (Indonesia)		PHI (Australia)		Pts.
1	(Switzerland) Dominique Aegerter	Yamaha	2	1	**1**	**1**	**1**	**1**	**1**	**1**	**1**	**1**	Ret	EX	3	1	**1**	**1**	**4**	**1**	**1**	**1**	4	1	5	1	498
2	(Italy) Lorenzo Baldassarri	Yamaha	**1**	**2**	Ret	2	2	3	2	2	2	2	**1**	**1**	1	5	2	4	2	7	9	3	Ret	9	4	3	388
3	(Turkey) Can Öncü	Kawasaki	3	Ret	Ret	3	4	5	4	5	5	8	21	4	4	6	3	2	9	3	4	7	3	3	3	Ret	264
4	(Italy) Nicolò Bulega	Ducati	5	3	3	4	3	Ret	3	3	Ret	3	9	2	11	3	Ret	14	15	10	11	8	6	7	2	4	242
5	(Italy) Federico Caricasulo	Ducati	8	12	5	25	5	Ret	Ret	6	Ret	4	Ret	6	**Ret**	**9**	4	6	3	4	3	2	2	5	**7**	**2**	222
6	(Italy) Stefano Manzi	Triumph	7	8	Ret	6	Ret	Ret	5	4	6	5	2	3	16	7	Ret	3	1	Ret	7	5	7	2	14	Ret	209
7	(Italy) Yari Montella	Kawasaki	Ret	7	12	9	6	4	6	7	4	Ret	Ret	Ret	5	10	13	8	13	Ret	8	Ret	5	6	1	5	171
8	(Finland) Niki Tuuli	MV Agusta	6	5	6	7	Ret	DNS					6	10	6	11	6	5	5	Ret	5	4	**1**	**Ret**	Ret	DNS	152
9	(Italy) Raffaele De Rosa	Ducati	16	9	9	15	22	Ret	22	10	3	6	Ret	20	12	14	12	Ret	6	2	2	Ret	9	4	6	6	147
10	(France) Jules Cluzel	Yamaha	19	6	4	Ret	Ret	Ret	7	9	Ret	DNS			10	2	8	15	7	6	6	6	8	10	Ret	11	132
11	(Netherlands) Glenn van Straalen	Yamaha	4	4	2	Ret	7	8	Ret	19	Ret	Ret	5	15	2	Ret	9	Ret	12	Ret	Ret	11	Ret	16	11	10	122
12	(Spain) Adrián Huertas	Kawasaki	9	11	11	Ret	8	7	10	15	18	7	8	7	8	12	7	10	Ret	DNS	Ret	10	10	12	10	12	120
13	(Estonia) Hannes Soomer	Triumph	11	10	7	5	Ret	12	11	12	7	Ret	19	9	15	Ret	18	13	8	8	10	Ret	Ret	8	Ret	15	95
14	(Turkey) Bahattin Sofuoğlu	MV Agusta	12	14	15	10	23	14	21	18	15	Ret	7	5	Ret	DNS	5	7	11	5							72
15	(France) Andy Verdoïa	Yamaha	15	16	DNS	DNS	9	DNS	13	11	8	9	Ret	12	19	13	14	16	21	11	Ret	9	12	13	16	9	66
16	(Australia) Oli Bayliss	Ducati	21	19	14	11	12	6	23	Ret	11	13	13	Ret	9	8	15	Ret	20	16	15	Ret	14	14	12	8	65
17	(France) Valentin Debise	Yamaha											4	8	7	4											43
18	(Denmark) Simon Jespersen	Yamaha					13	Ret							21	16	10	12	16	12			Ret	15	9	14	40
18	(Denmark) Simon Jespersen	Ducati									9	10															40
19	(Hungary) Péter Sebestyén	Yamaha	14	Ret	22	DNS	24	13	12	14	Ret	16	14	11	13	20	Ret	20	14	Ret	12	12	13	22	13	13	40
20	(United Kingdom) Kyle Smith	Yamaha	20	20	16	8	11	2	Ret	16	14	Ret	22	Ret	17	24											35
21	(Italy) Leonardo Taccini	Yamaha	18	Ret	10	13	14	DNS	14	Ret	13	15	16	13	14	Ret	11	9	Ret	DNS			15	18	17	19	35
22	(Switzerland) Marcel Brenner	Yamaha	17	Ret	Ret	12	15	18	9	13	10	Ret	20	14	WD	WD	17	11	Ret	13	Ret	15	16	19	Ret	20	32
23	(United Kingdom) Tom Booth-Amos	Kawasaki	13	15	Ret	DNS	DNS	DNS	Ret	DNS	16	17	15	17	20	17	19	24	Ret	Ret	13	13	11	11	8	18	29
24	(Italy) Mattia Casadei	MV Agusta							8	8	12	11															25
25	(Spain) Isaac Viñales	Ducati									20	14	10	Ret	18	15	21	23	10	9							22
26	(Germany) Patrick Hobelsberger	Yamaha	10	13	8	16	WD	WD	Ret	22	DNS	DNS	12	Ret	25	21	20	17	26	18	17	16					21
27	(Czech Republic) Ondřej Vostatek	Yamaha	24	22	Ret	18	10	10	19	24	17	18	11	16	22	22	24	18	18	15	16	14	17	21	Ret	17	20
28	(South Africa) Steven Odendaal	Yamaha											3	Ret													16
29	(Germany) Marcel Schrötter	MV Agusta																							Ret	7	9
30	(Spain) Unai Orradre	Yamaha	26	17	13	14	16	Ret	Ret	Ret	Ret	12	18	Ret	Ret	19	16	Ret					18	20	Ret	21	9
31	(Australia) Tom Edwards	Yamaha			DSQ	Ret	17	9											Ret	Ret							7
32	(Italy) Luca Ottaviani	Yamaha					21	11	17	Ret																	5
33	(United Kingdom) Bradley Smith	Yamaha																			14	Ret					2
34	(Austria) Maximilian Kofler	Ducati	22	Ret	20	19	Ret	16	16	17	19	Ret	17	Ret	24	18	29	25	23	14							2
35	(San Marino) Luca Bernardi	Ducati																			Ret	Ret	Ret	17	15	16	1
36	(Italy) Nicholas Spinelli	Ducati							15	21																	1
37	(Australia) Benjamin Currie	Kawasaki					Ret	15	Ret	26	Ret	19	24	19	Ret	23	26	Ret	22	19							1
	(Netherlands) Jaimie van Sikkelerus	Yamaha			17	17																					0
	(Italy) Federico Fuligni	Ducati	DNS	DNS	23	22	20	Ret	18	23	22	21	23	18	23	26	25	21	19	17							0
	(Netherlands) Jeffrey Buis	Kawasaki	Ret	18	18	20	25	17	Ret	27	21	20	25	21	26	25	27	26	24	Ret							0
	(France) Johan Gimbert	Yamaha																	17	21							0
	(Netherlands) Sander Kroeze	Yamaha					18	Ret	20	25	23	Ret															0
	(Italy) Filippo Fuligni	Ducati	23	21	19	21	19	Ret																			0
	(Spain) Julián Giral	Ducati															22	19									0
	(Brazil) Meikon Kawakami	Yamaha																	Ret	20							0
	(Italy) Matteo Patacca	Ducati							Ret	20																	0
	(Republic of Ireland) Eugene McManus	Kawasaki	26	23	21	23																					0
	(Spain) Aleix Viu	Yamaha															23	22									0
	(Spain) Joan Díaz Corbella	Yamaha																	25	22							0
	(Czech Republic) Patrik Homola	Yamaha											26	22													0
	(Italy) Alessandro Zetti	Yamaha	25	Ret	Ret	24																					0
	(Spain) Marc Alcoba	Yamaha															28	27									0
	(United Kingdom) Harry Truelove	Yamaha									Ret	Ret															0
	(Switzerland) Baris Sahin	Yamaha																			WD	WD					0
	(France) Matthieu Grégorio	Yamaha													WD	WD											0
Pos.	Rider	Bike	ARA (Spain)		ASS (Netherlands)		EST (Portugal)		MIS (Italy)		DON (United Kingdom)		MOS (Czech Republic)		MAG (France)		BAR (Spain)		POR (Portugal)		VIL (Argentina)		MAN (Indonesia)		PHI (Australia)		Pts.

Colour	Result
Gold	Winner
Silver	Second place
Bronze	Third place
Green	Points classification
Blue	Non-points classification
Blue	Non-classified finish (NC)
Purple	Retired, not classified (Ret)
Red	Did not qualify (DNQ)
Red	Did not pre-qualify (DNPQ)
Black	Disqualified (DSQ)
White	Did not start (DNS)
White	Withdrew (WD)
White	Race cancelled (C)
Blank	Did not practice (DNP)
Blank	Did not arrive (DNA)
Blank	Excluded (EX)

**Bold** – Pole position
Italics – Fastest lap

=== Teams' championship ===
Pos.	Team	Bike No.	ARA (Spain)		ASS (Netherlands)		EST (Portugal)		MIS (Italy)		DON (United Kingdom)		MOS (Czech Republic)		MAG (France)		BAR (Spain)		POR (Portugal)		VIL (Argentina)		MAN (Indonesia)		PHI (Australia)		Pts.
Pos.	Team	Bike No.	R1	R2	R1	R2	R1	R2	R1	R2	R1	R2	R1	R2	R1	R2	R1	R2	R1	R2	R1	R2	R1	R2	R1	R2	Pts.
1	Ten Kate Racing Yamaha	24	18	Ret	10	13	14	DNS	14	Ret	13	15	16	13	14	Ret	11	9	Ret	DNS			15	18	17	19	535
1	Ten Kate Racing Yamaha	57																			14	Ret					535
1	Ten Kate Racing Yamaha	77	2	1	**1**	**1**	**1**	**1**	**1**	**1**	**1**	**1**	Ret	EX	3	1	**1**	**1**	**4**	**1**	**1**	**1**	4	1	5	1	535
2	Kawasaki Puccetti Racing	55	Ret	7	12	9	6	4	6	7	4	Ret	Ret	Ret	5	10	13	8	13	Ret	8	Ret	5	6	1	5	435
2	Kawasaki Puccetti Racing	61	3	Ret	Ret	3	4	5	4	5	5	8	21	4	4	6	3	2	9	3	4	7	3	3	3	Ret	435
3	Evan Bros. WorldSSP Yamaha Team	7	**1**	**2**	Ret	2	2	3	2	2	2	2	**1**	**1**	1	5	2	4	2	7	9	3	Ret	9	4	3	428
3	Evan Bros. WorldSSP Yamaha Team	56	14	Ret	22	DNS	24	13	12	14	Ret	16	14	11	13	20	Ret	20	14	Ret	12	12	13	22	13	13	428
4	Dynavolt Triumph	38	11	10	7	5	Ret	12	11	12	7	Ret	19	9	15	Ret	18	13	8	8	10	Ret	Ret	8	Ret	15	304
4	Dynavolt Triumph	62	7	8	Ret	6	Ret	Ret	5	4	6	5	2	3	16	7	Ret	3	1	Ret	7	5	7	2	14	Ret	304
5	MV Agusta Reparto Corse	27							8	8	12	11															258
5	MV Agusta Reparto Corse	54	12	14	15	10	23	14	21	18	15	Ret	7	5	Ret	DNS	5	7	11	5							258
5	MV Agusta Reparto Corse	66	6	5	6	7	Ret	DNS					6	10	6	11	6	5	5	Ret	5	4	**1**	**Ret**	Ret	DNS	258
5	MV Agusta Reparto Corse	92																							Ret	7	258
6	Aruba.it Racing WorldSSP Team	11	5	3	3	4	3	Ret	3	3	Ret	3	9	2	11	3	Ret	14	15	10	11	8	6	7	2	4	242
7	GMT94 Yamaha	16	19	6	4	Ret	Ret	Ret	7	9	Ret	DNS			10	2	8	15	7	6	6	6	8	10	Ret	11	238
7	GMT94 Yamaha	42													WD	WD											238
7	GMT94 Yamaha	53											4	8	7	4											238
7	GMT94 Yamaha	94	15	16	DNS	DNS	9	DNS	13	11	8	9	Ret	12	19	13	14	16	21	11	Ret	9	12	13	16	9	238
8	Althea Racing	64	8	12	5	25	5	Ret	Ret	6	Ret	4	Ret	6	**Ret**	**9**	4	6	3	4	3	2	2	5	**7**	**2**	222
9	Orelac Racing VerdNatura WorldSSP	3	16	9	9	15	22	Ret	22	10	3	6	Ret	20	12	14	12	Ret	6	2	2	Ret	9	4	6	6	147
10	EAB Racing Team	28	4	4	2	Ret	7	8	Ret	19	Ret	Ret	5	15	2	Ret	9	Ret	12	Ret	Ret	11	Ret	16	11	10	122
11	MTM Kawasaki	99	9	11	11	Ret	8	7	10	15	18	7	8	7	8	12	7	10	Ret	DNS	Ret	10	10	12	10	12	120
12	VFT Racing	17	20	20	16	8	11	2	Ret	16	14	Ret	22	Ret	17	24											67
12	VFT Racing	25	17	Ret	Ret	12	15	18	9	13	10	Ret	20	14	WD	WD	17	11	Ret	13	Ret	15	16	19	Ret	20	67
12	VFT Racing	47																	17	21							67
12	VFT Racing	70															28	27									67
13	Barni Spark Racing Team	32	21	19	14	11	12	6	23	Ret	11	13	13	Ret	9	8	15	Ret	20	16	15	Ret	14	14	12	8	65
14	Kallio Racing	9					13	Ret							21	16	10	12	16	12			Ret	15	9	14	64
14	Kallio Racing	36					18	Ret	20	25	23	Ret															64
14	Kallio Racing	44											3	Ret													64
14	Kallio Racing	52	10	13	8	16	WD	WD	Ret	22	DNS	DNS	12	Ret	25	21	20	17	26	18	17	16					64
14	Kallio Racing	88	25	Ret	Ret	24																					64
15	MS Racing Yamaha WorldSSP	10	26	17	13	14	16	Ret	Ret	Ret	Ret	12	18	Ret	Ret	19	16	Ret					18	20	Ret	21	29
15	MS Racing Yamaha WorldSSP	50	24	22	Ret	18	10	10	19	24	17	18	11	16	22	22	24	18	18	15	16	14	17	21	Ret	17	29
15	MS Racing Yamaha WorldSSP	72																			WD	WD					29
15	MS Racing Yamaha WorldSSP	83																	Ret	20							29
16	D34G Racing	12	23	21	19	21	19	Ret																			23
16	D34G Racing	22	DNS	DNS	23	22	20	Ret	18	23	22	21	23	18	23	26	25	21	19	17							23
16	D34G Racing	23									20	14	10	Ret	18	15	21	23	10	9							23
16	D34G Racing	29							15	21																	23
17	Motozoo Racing by Puccetti	6	Ret	18	18	20	25	17	Ret	27	21	20	25	21	26	25	27	26	24	Ret							19
17	Motozoo Racing by Puccetti	15	26	23	21	23																					19
17	Motozoo Racing by Puccetti	21					Ret	15	Ret	26	Ret	19	24	19	Ret	23	26	Ret	22	19							19
17	Motozoo Racing by Puccetti	69																			13	13	11	11	8	18	19
18	CM Racing	9									9	10															16
18	CM Racing	73	22	Ret	20	19	Ret	16	16	17	19	Ret	17	Ret	24	18	29	25	23	14							16
18	CM Racing	91																									16
19	Prodina Racing WorldSSP	69	13	15	Ret	DNS	DNS	DNS	Ret	DNS	16	17	15	17	20	17	19	24	Ret	Ret							11
20	Yart-Yamaha WorldSSP	71			DSQ	Ret	17	9											Ret	Ret							7
Pos.	Team	Bike No.	ARA (Spain)		ASS (Netherlands)		EST (Portugal)		MIS (Italy)		DON (United Kingdom)		MOS (Czech Republic)		MAG (France)		BAR (Spain)		POR (Portugal)		VIL (Argentina)		MAN (Indonesia)		PHI (Australia)		Pts.

=== Manufacturers' championship ===
Pos.	Manufacturer	ARA (Spain)		ASS (Netherlands)		EST (Portugal)		MIS (Italy)		DON (United Kingdom)		MOS (Czech Republic)		MAG (France)		BAR (Spain)		POR (Portugal)		VIL (Argentina)		MAN (Indonesia)		PHI (Australia)		Pts.
1	(Japan) Yamaha	1	1	1	1	1	1	1	1	1	1	1	1	1	1	1	1	2	1	1	1	4	1	4	1	571
2	(Italy) Ducati	5	3	3	4	3	6	3	3	3	3	9	2	9	3	4	6	3	2	2	2	2	4	2	2	368
3	(Japan) Kawasaki	3	7	11	3	4	4	4	5	4	7	8	4	4	6	3	2	9	3	4	7	3	3	1	5	311
4	(United Kingdom) Triumph	7	8	7	5	Ret	12	5	4	6	5	2	3	15	7	18	3	1	8	7	5	7	2	14	15	233
5	(Italy) MV Agusta	6	5	6	7	23	14	8	8	12	11	6	5	6	11	5	5	5	5	5	4	1	Ret	Ret	7	205
Pos.	Manufacturer	ARA (Spain)		ASS (Netherlands)		EST (Portugal)		MIS (Italy)		DON (United Kingdom)		MOS (Czech Republic)		MAG (France)		BAR (Spain)		POR (Portugal)		VIL (Argentina)		MAN (Indonesia)		PHI (Australia)		Pts.
