= Naomichi Uramoto =

Japanese motorcycle racer (born 1994)

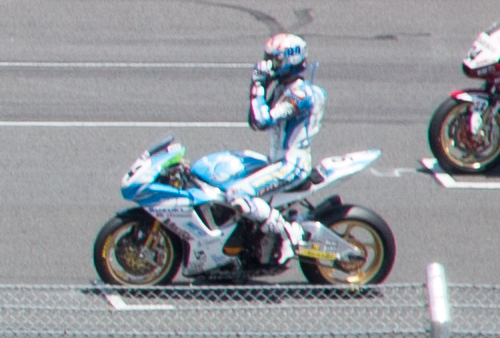
- Uramoto in 2016
- Nationality: Japanese
- Born: 24 July 1994 (age 32); Setagaya, Tokyo, Japan
- Current team: AutoRace Ube Racing Team
- Bike number: 94
- Website: naomichi-uramoto.jp
Motorcycle racing career statistics
Moto2 World Championship
Active years	2016
Manufacturers	Kalex
2016 championship position	NC (0 pts)
Starts / Wins / Podiums / Poles / F. laps / Points; 1 / 0 / 0 / 0 / 0 / 0
Superbike World Championship
Active years	2021
Manufacturers	Suzuki
Championships	0
2021 championship position	NC (0 pts)
Starts / Wins / Podiums / Poles / F. laps / Points; 3 / 0 / 0 / 0 / 0 / 0

Naomichi Uramoto (Japanese: 浦本 修充, Hepburn: Uramoto Naomichi; born 24 July 1994) is a Japanese motorcycle racer who competes in the FIM Endurance World Championship and All Japan Road Race Championship for AutoRace Ube Racing Team, aboard a BMW M1000RR. He was the All Japan J-GP2 champion in 2016. He currently competes in the RFME Superstock 1000 Championship aboard a Suzuki GSX-R1000.

== Career ==
In 2016, Uramoto made his Grand Prix debut with the Japan-GP2 team riding a Kalex in the Moto2 class at Motegi, finishing the race in 21st place.

=== FIM EWC ===
On 27 January 2026, it was announced that Uramoto will partner up with Sylvain Guintoli and Hannes Soomer in the AutoRace Ube Racing Team for the 2026 season.

== Career statistics ==
=== Career highlights ===
- 2017 - NC, European Superstock 1000 Championship, Suzuki GSX-R1000

=== Grand Prix motorcycle racing ===
==== By season ====
Season	Class	Motorcycle	Team	Race	Win	Podium	Pole	FLap	Pts	Plcd
2016	Moto2	Kalex	Japan-GP2	1	0	0	0	0	0	NC
Total				**1**	**0**	**0**	**0**	**0**	**0**	

==== Races by year ====
Year	Class	Bike	1	2	3	4	5	6	7	8	9	10	11	12	13	14	15	16	17	18	Pos.	Pts
2016	Moto2	Kalex	QAT	ARG	AME	SPA	FRA	ITA	CAT	NED	GER	AUT	CZE	GBR	RSM	ARA	JPN; 21	AUS	MAL	VAL	NC	0

=== European Superstock 1000 Championship ===
==== Races by year ====
(key) (Races in bold indicate pole position) (Races in italics indicate fastest lap)

Year	Bike	1	2	3	4	5	6	7	8	9	Pos	Pts
2017	Suzuki	ARA	NED	IMO	DON	MIS	LAU	ALG	MAG	JER; DNS	NC	0

=== Superbike World Championship ===
==== Races by year ====
(key) (Races in bold indicate pole position, races in italics indicate fastest lap)

Year	Bike	1			2			3			4			5			6			7			8			9			10			11			12			13			Pos	Pts
Year	Bike	R1	SR	R2	R1	SR	R2	R1	SR	R2	R1	SR	R2	R1	SR	R2	R1	SR	R2	R1	SR	R2	R1	SR	R2	R1	SR	R2	R1	SR	R2	R1	SR	R2	R1	SR	R2	R1	SR	R2	Pos	Pts
2021	Suzuki	SPA	SPA	SPA	POR	POR	POR	ITA	ITA	ITA	GBR	GBR	GBR	NED	NED	NED	CZE	CZE	CZE	SPA	SPA	SPA	FRA	FRA	FRA	SPA	SPA	SPA	SPA; 16	SPA; 19	SPA; Ret	POR	POR	POR	ARG	ARG	ARG	INA	INA	INA	NC	0

=== British Superbike Championship ===
==== By year ====
Year	Bike	1			2			3			4			5			6			7			8			9			10			11			Pos	Pts
Year	Bike	R1	R2	R3	R1	R2	R3	R1	R2	R3	R1	R2	R3	R1	R2	R3	R1	R2	R3	R1	R2	R3	R1	R2	R3	R1	R2	R3	R1	R2	R3	R1	R2	R3	Pos	Pts
2021	Suzuki	OUL	OUL	OUL	KNO	KNO	KNO	BHGP	BHGP	BHGP	THR	THR	THR	DON	DON	DON	CAD	CAD	CAD	SNE	SNE	SNE	SIL	SIL	SIL	OUL	OUL	OUL	DON; Ret	DON; 13	DON; 13	BHGP	BHGP	BHGP	27th	6

=== All Japan Road Race Championship ===
==== Races by year ====
(key) (Races in bold indicate pole position; races in italics indicate fastest lap)

Year	Class	Bike	1	2	3	4	5	6	7	8	9	10	Pos	Pts
2025	JSB1000	BMW	**MOT**; 3	**SUG1**; Ret	SUG2; 2	MOT1; 1	MOT2; 1	AUT1	AUT2	OKA	**SUZ1**; 2	**SUZ2**; 2	3rd	132
2026	JSB1000	BMW	MOT	SUG1	SUG2	AUT1	AUT2	MOT1	MOT2	OKA	SUZ1; Ret	SUZ2; 5	20th	14

=== 24 Hours of Le Mans results ===
Year	Class	Team	Co-riders	Bike	Pos
2026	**EWC**	(Japan) AutoRace Ube Racing Team	(France) Sylvain Guintoli (Estonia) Hannes Soomer	BMW M1000RR	5th

=== Suzuka 8 Hours results ===
Year	Class	Team	Co-riders	Bike	Pos
2024	**EWC**	(Japan) SDG Team Harc-Pro Honda	(Japan) Yuki Kunii (Indonesia) Mario Aji	Honda CBR1000RR-R SP	9th
2026	**EWC**	(Japan) AutoRace Ube Racing Team	(France) Sylvain Guintoli (Estonia) Hannes Soomer	BMW M1000RR	5th
