= Hannes Soomer =

Estonian motorcycle racer (born 1998)

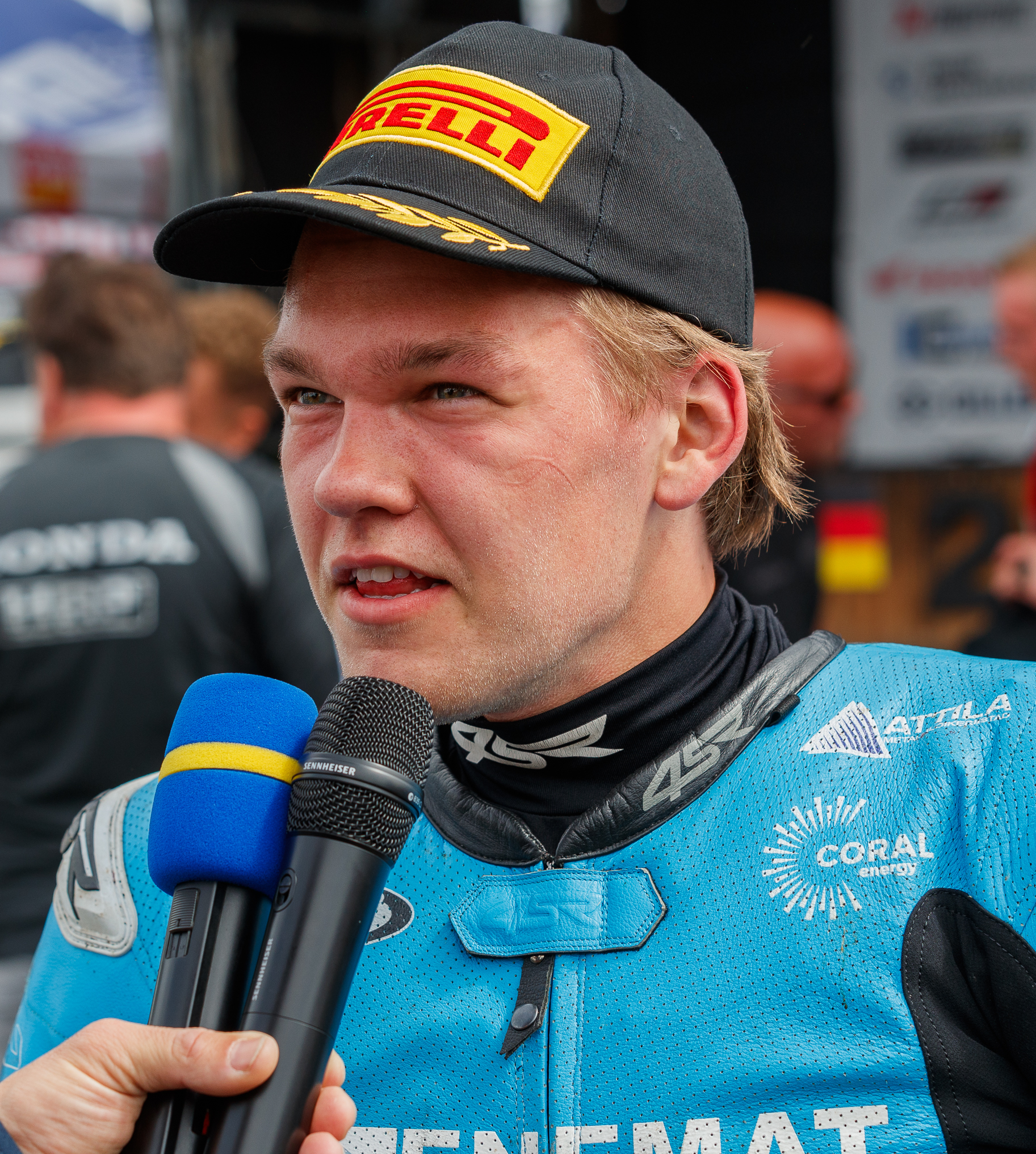
- Soomer in 2023
- Nationality: Estonian
- Born: 17 February 1998 (age 28); Tallinn, Estonia
- Current team: Masteroil Alpha Van Zon BMW
- Bike number: 38
- Website: hannessoomer.com
Motorcycle racing career statistics
Superbike World Championship
| Active years | 2023, 2026 |
| Manufacturers | Honda, BMW |
| 2026 championship position | 28th (0pts) |
Starts / Wins / Podiums / Poles / F. laps / Points; 9 / 0 / 0 / 0 / 0 / 1
Supersport World Championship
| Active years | 2015-2022 |
| Manufacturers | Yamaha, Honda, Triumph |
| 2022 championship position | 13th (95pts) |
Starts / Wins / Podiums / Poles / F. laps / Points; 92 / 0 / 3 / 0 / 1 / 419

Hannes Soomer (born 17 February 1998), nicknamed Baltic Bullet, is an Estonian motorcycle racer. In 2017, he won the European Supersport Cup with WILSport Racedays. In 2026, he is racing for Masteroil Alpha Van Zon BMW in the EuroMoto Superbike Championship.

== Career ==
=== Early career ===
Soomer made his debut in the ADAC Minibike Cup at the season finale at the Sachsenring in 2006, finishing in seventh in race 1 and sixth in race 2 in Group B. He continued to race in the championship from 2008 to 2010 getting a race win in 2009, and finishing second in the standings in 2010, just two points behind the champion.

In 2011 and 2012, Soomer would race in the ADAC Junior Cup riding the Aprilia RS125. He achieved a podium in 2012 and finished fifth overall.

=== European Junior Cup ===
in 2013, Soomer made his debut in the European Junior Cup, a one-make series that was held as a feeder series during the European rounds of the Superbike World Championship. He finished 22nd in the standings with a best finish of eighth in Imola. In 2014, he would continue to race in the championship, with a best result of fifth at Assen, finishing eighth in the standings. He continued to race in the series until 2016, but left mid-season to ride for Kallio Racing in the Supersport World Championship after gaining two race wins at Assen and Misano.

=== Supersport World Championship ===
Soomer made his World Supersport debut in 2015, wildcarding for Kallio Racing at Magny-Cours, where he finished in 21st position. In 2016, he would again do wildcards for Kallio Racing at the Lausitzring, Magny-Cours, and Jerez, finishing 21st, 12th, and 19th respectively.

In 2017, Soomer competed in the European Supersport Cup on the CBR600RR of WILSport Racedays. He would take part in every race included in the European portion of the calendar, and won the cup at Jerez with 28 points, finishing 18th in the world standings. In 2018, Soomer would stay with the Racedays team and compete in the full world championship calendar for the first time. At the end of the season, he would finish in 16th, with a best result of seventh at Estoril. He continued with the team in 2019 and this time finished the season in 14th, with a best result of seventh at Misano. He missed the Portuguese round due to an injury he sustained the month prior.

In 2020, Soomer would move back to Kallio Racing on the Yamaha YZF-R6. He was a consistent top-ten finisher and ended up getting three podiums during the season, two of them at Magny-Cours, and the final one at Estoril. He finished ninth in the world standings. He remained with the team in 2021, missing two rounds (Most and Navarra) due to a leg injury. He finished the season in 12th with 105 championship points.

In 2022, Soomer would make the switch to the Dynavolt Triumph team, his teammate being Stefano Manzi. Soomer finished 13th in the standings with a best result of fifth in Race 2 at Assen.

=== Superbike World Championship ===
In 2023, Petronas MIE Honda chose Soomer to race in place of Hafizh Syahrin for the Czech and French rounds due to an injury.

In 2026, Soomer replaced Danilo Petrucci at a test in Misano due to an injury he had sustained at the Czech round. After the test, on May 26, it was announced that he would again be replacing Petrucci at the Aragón round and being absent from EuroMoto's second round at Brno.

=== IDM Superbike / EuroMoto Series ===
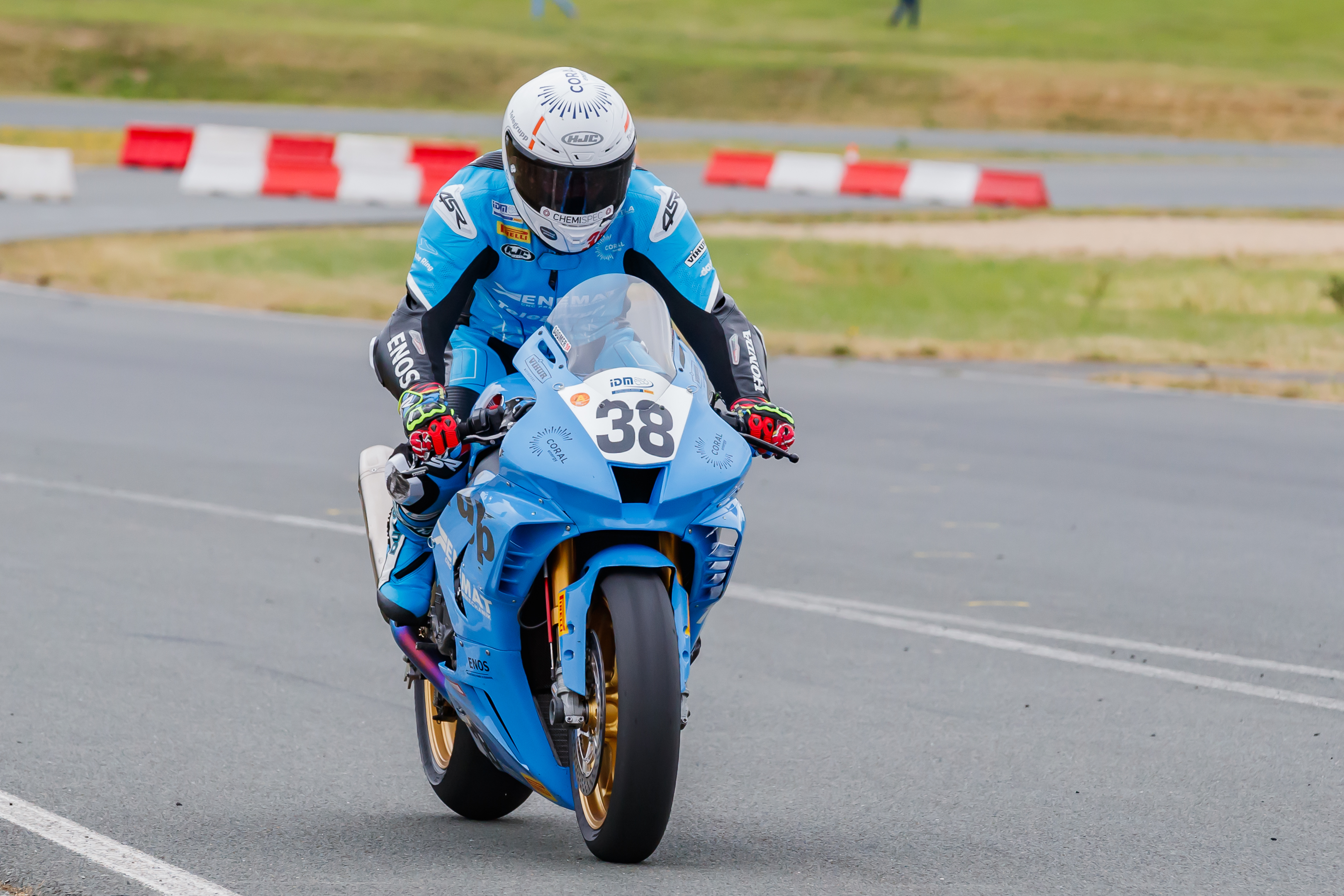
Soomer in 2023

In 2023, Soomer made the switch from Supersport to Superbike, racing in the IDM Superbike championship with the Honda CBR1000RR. He started the season getting five podiums in a row at Sachsenring, Oschersleben, and Most respectively. He finished fourth in the standings with 185 championship points.

In 2024, Soomer switched to the BMW M1000RR. Before the start of the season, he sustained an injury at the 24 Hours of Le Mans and was unable to compete in the first round. At the third round at Most, in Race 1 Soomer would battle with Illia Mykhalchyk for the win until the final lap, where Soomer crashed in the penultimate corner, resulting in a DNF. At the fifth round at the Schleizer Dreieck, he would finish in eighth and tenth. At Assen, he finished second in both races. In the penultimate round at the Nürburgring, Soomer would finish second in Race 1 after battling for the win with Mykalchyk until the final lap. In Race 2, he would gain his first victory in the IDM, after battling for the win with Mykalchyk once again. Soomer would not take part in the final round at Hockenheim, due to an injury sustained at the Bol d'Or.

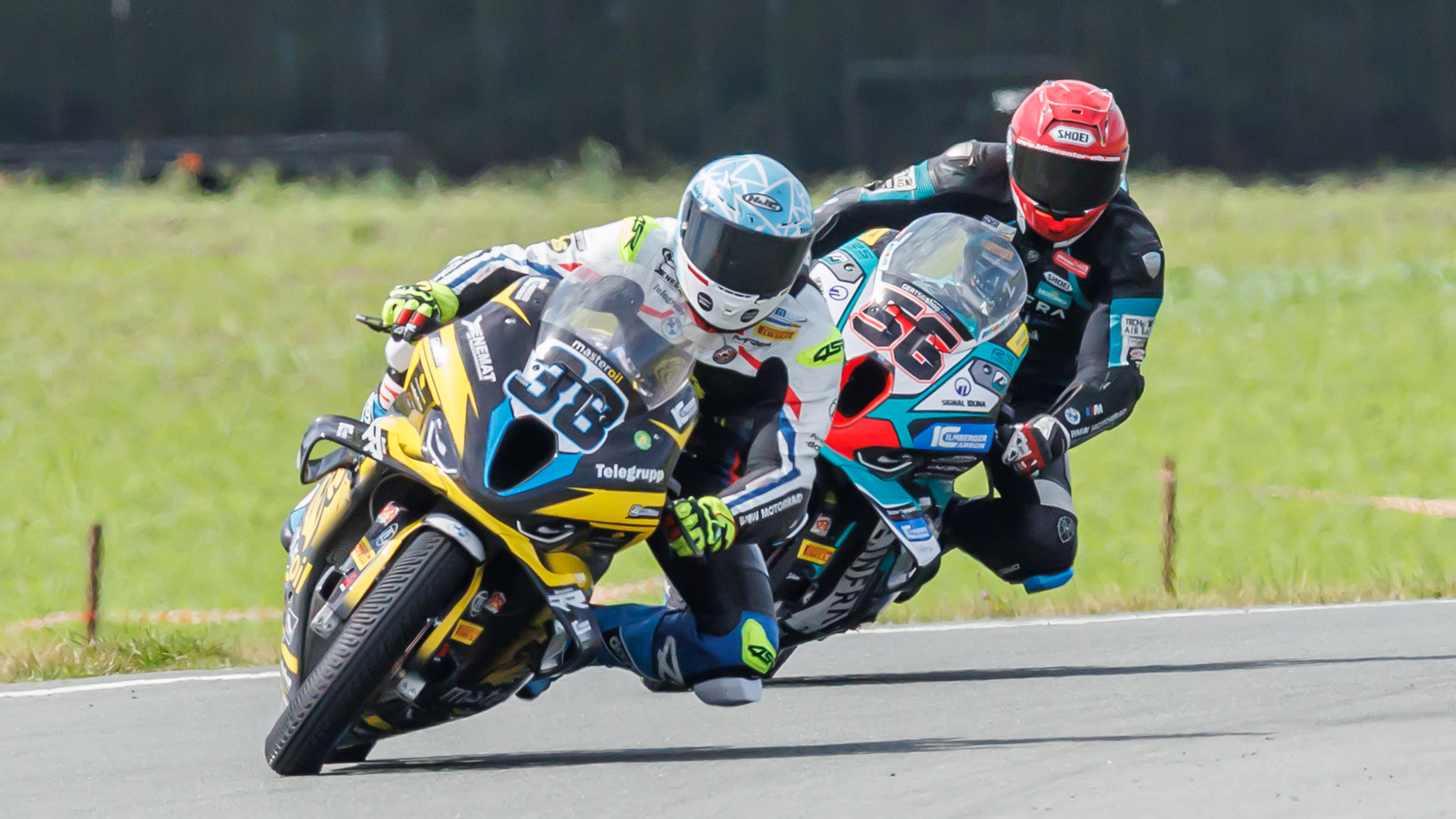
Hannes Soomer and Toni Finsterbusch at Schleiz in 2025

In 2025, Soomer made the switch to the factory team of BMW, that being Masteroil Alpha Van Zon BMW. He started the season off by getting a win and a second place finish at Oschersleben, followed by fourth and fifth place finishes at Schleiz, which had mixed weather. In Race 1 at Most, he won against Florian Alt by 0,059 seconds after battling with him for most of the race. In the fourth round at Oschersleben, Soomer started fifth on the grid for Race 1. On lap 13, Soomer passed Florian Alt for second, and crashed on the entry to the following corner, which resulted in a broken finger, causing him to not compete in Race 2. Soomer would return for the following round at Assen, finishing seventh in both races. At the Nürburgring, Soomer finished second and third in Race 1 and 2 respectively.In the final round at Hockenheim, Soomer started third on the grid for Race 1, which was red-flagged due to a crash that happened with Maximilian Kofler and Lorenzo Zanetti. After the restart, the race was once again red-flagged on lap 6. Soomer finished Race 1 in fourth position with half-points. In Race 2, Soomer finished 14th, after going off-track on lap 4 and crashing on lap 7, before remounting. Soomer finished the season in third, with 177.5 points.

In 2026, Soomer continued to race for Masteroil Alpha Van Zon BMW, but instead in the EuroMoto Series. At the opening round at the Sachsenring, he finished fourth in Race 1 and third in Race 2. He didn't take part of the second round at Brno, due to replacing WorldSBK rider Danilo Petrucci at Aragon. He returned at Most for the third round and finished sixth in both races. Due to injuring his shoulder at a test for the Suzuka 8 Hours, he wasn't able to compete in the season's fourth and fifth rounds at Oschersleben and Assen. He returned at the penultimate round at the Nürburgring, where he qualified tenth. He finished ninth in Race 1 and twelfth in Race 2. In the final round of the season at the Hockenheimring, he crashed and therefore DNF-ed in Race 1 due to a collision with Kevin Orgis in turn 1, where Soomer was hit from behind by Orgis. Soomer finished ninth in Race 2. He finished the season in twelfth position with 70 points.

=== FIM Endurance World Championship/World Cup ===
In 2024, it was announced that Soomer would be the reserve rider for the BMW Motorrad World Endurance Team and the fourth rider for the Tecmas-MRP-BMW Racing Team for the following season. He would race for Tecmas at the 24 Hours of Le Mans, where he crashed in the early morning and injured his shoulder. The team would retire from the race later on due to a technical issue.

For the Suzuka 8 Hours, Soomer would race for the TONE RT SYNCEDGE 4413 BMW Team in the Superstock class. Him and his team would go on to win the race. At the Bol d'Or, Soomer was racing in place of Sylvain Guintoli in the factory team. Starting from Pole, the team was consistently in the top-two positions for a big chunk of the race. In the early hours of the morning, Soomer would have a highside crash, where he fractured his upper-arm and dislocated his shoulder. He would ride the bike back into the pits, pulling out of the race. The team would go on to finish in fifth place.

On January 14, 2025, it was announced that Soomer would stay with the BMW Motorrad World Endurance Team for 2025, as the fourth rider. At the Spa 8 Hours, he would race for Tecmas alongside Jan Bühn and Leandro Mercado, and went on to win the race in the Superstock class. Soomer would again race for Tecmas at the Bol d'Or, once again winning the race with the team in the Superstock class, and finishing third overall.

On January 27, 2026 at the BMW Motorrad Team Launch in Portugal, it was announced that Soomer would partner up with Naomichi Uramoto and Sylvain Guintoli in the AutoRace Ube Racing Team for the 2026 season.

== Career statistics ==
=== Supersport World Championship ===
==== By season ====
| Season | Team | Motorcycle | Races | Wins | Podiums | Poles | Points | Result |
|---|---|---|---|---|---|---|---|---|
| 2015 | Kallio Racing | Yamaha YZF-R6 | 1 | 0 | 0 | 0 | 0 | 49th |
| 2016 | Kallio Racing | Yamaha YZF-R6 | 3 | 0 | 0 | 0 | 4 | 33th |
| 2017 | WILSport Racedays | Honda CBR 600 RR | 9 | 0 | 0 | 0 | 28 | 18th |
| 2018 | Racedays | Honda CBR 600 RR | 12 | 0 | 0 | 0 | 36 | 16th |
| 2019 | MPM WILSport Racedays | Honda CBR 600 RR | 11 | 0 | 0 | 0 | 36 | 14th |
| 2020 | Kallio Racing | Yamaha YZF-R6 | 15 | 0 | 3 | 0 | 115 | 9th |
| 2021 | Kallio Racing | Yamaha YZF-R6 | 17 | 0 | 0 | 0 | 105 | 12th |
| 2022 | Dynavolt Triumph | Triumph Street Triple RS | 24 | 0 | 0 | 0 | 95 | 13th |
| Total | | | 92 | 0 | 3 | 0 | 419 | |

=== EuroMoto Championship ===
==== By season ====
| Season | Team | Motorcycle | Races | Wins | Podiums | Points | Result |
|---|---|---|---|---|---|---|---|
| 2023 | Enemat Enos Motorsport | Honda CBR 1000 RR | 14 | 0 | 8 | 185 | 4th |
| 2024 | Enemat Enos Motorsport | BMW M1000RR | 10 | 1 | 5 | 136 | 7th |
| 2025 | Masteroil Alpha Van Zon BMW | BMW M1000RR | 13 | 2 | 6 | 177,5 | 3rd |
| 2026 | Masteroil Alpha Van Zon BMW | BMW M1000RR | 8 | 0 | 1 | 70 | 12th |
| Total | | | 45 | 3 | 20 | 568,5 | |

==== Races by year ====
(key) (Races in bold indicate pole position; races in italics indicate fastest lap)

| Year | Class | Motorcycle | 1 | | 2 | | 3 | | 4 | | 5 | | 6 | | 7 | | Pos | Pts |
| Year | Class | Motorcycle | R1 | R2 | R1 | R2 | R1 | R2 | R1 | R2 | R1 | R2 | R1 | R2 | R1 | R2 | Pos | Pts |
|---|---|---|---|---|---|---|---|---|---|---|---|---|---|---|---|---|---|---|
| 2023 | Superbike | Honda | SAC; 3 | SAC; 3 | OSC; 3 | OSC; 2 | CZE; 3 | CZE; DNF | SCH; 3 | SCH; 10 | AUS; 8 | AUS; 4 | NED; 5 | NED; 5 | HOC; 3 | HOC; 2 | 4th | 185 |
| 2024 | Superbike | BMW | SAC | SAC | OSC; 5 | OSC; 8 | CZE; DNF | CZE; 3 | SCH; 8 | SCH; 10 | NED; 2 | NED; 2 | NÜR; 2 | NÜR; 1 | HOC | HOC | 7th | 136 |
| 2025 | Superbike | BMW | OSC; 1 | OSC; 2 | SCH; 4 | SCH; 5 | CZE; 1 | CZE; 3 | OSC; DNF | OSC | NED; 7 | NED; 7 | NÜR; 2 | NÜR; 3 | HOC; 4 | HOC; 14 | 3rd | 177.5 |
| 2026 | Superbike | BMW | SAC; 4 | SAC; 3 | BRN | BRN | CZE; 6 | CZE; 6 | OSC | OSC | NED | NED | NÜR 9 | NÜR 12 | HOC DNF | HOC 9 | 12th | 70 |

=== Superbike World Championship ===
==== By season ====
| Season | Team | Motorcycle | Races | Wins | Podiums | Points | Result |
|---|---|---|---|---|---|---|---|
| 2023 | Petronas MIE Racing Honda Team | Honda CBR1000RR | 6 | 0 | 0 | 1 | 25th |
| 2026 | ROKiT BMW Motorrad WorldSBK Team | BMW M1000RR | 3 | 0 | 0 | 0 | 28th |
| Total | | | 9 | 0 | 0 | 1 | |

==== By race ====
(key) (Races in bold indicate pole position; races in italics indicate fastest lap)

| Year | Bike | 1 | | | 2 | | | 3 | | | 4 | | | 5 | | | 6 | | | 7 | | | 8 | | | 9 | | | 10 | | | 11 | | | 12 | | | Pos | Pts |
| Year | Bike | R1 | SR | R2 | R1 | SR | R2 | R1 | SR | R2 | R1 | SR | R2 | R1 | SR | R2 | R1 | SR | R2 | R1 | SR | R2 | R1 | SR | R2 | R1 | SR | R2 | R1 | SR | R2 | R1 | SR | R2 | R1 | SR | R2 | Pos | Pts |
|---|---|---|---|---|---|---|---|---|---|---|---|---|---|---|---|---|---|---|---|---|---|---|---|---|---|---|---|---|---|---|---|---|---|---|---|---|---|---|---|
| 2023 | Honda | AUS | AUS | AUS | INA | INA | INA | NED | NED | NED | SPA | SPA | SPA | EMI | EMI | EMI | GBR | GBR | GBR | ITA | ITA | ITA | CZE DNF | CZE 19 | CZE 19 | FRA 21 | FRA 17 | FRA 15 | SPA | SPA | SPA | POR | POR | POR | ESP | ESP | ESP | 25th | 1 |
| 2026 | BMW | AUS | AUS | AUS | POR | POR | POR | NED | NED | NED | HUN | HUN | HUN | SPA DNF | SPA 15 | SPA 18 | | | | | | | | | | | | | | | | | | | | | | 28th | 0 |

=== FIM Endurance World Championship/World Cup ===
==== By team ====
| Year | Team | Motorcycle | Class | Riders | TC |
|---|---|---|---|---|---|
| 2024 | (Belgium) BMW Motorrad World Endurance Team | BMW S1000RR | EWC | (Ukraine) Illia Mykhalchyk (France) Sylvain Guintoli (Germany) Markus Reiterberger (Estonia) Hannes Soomer | 3rd |
| 2024 | (Japan) TONE RT SYNCEDGE 4413 BMW | BMW S1000RR | SST | (Japan) Tomoya Hoshino (Japan) Ainosuke Yoshida (Estonia) Hannes Soomer | 13th |
| 2025 | (Belgium) TECMAS MRP BMW RACING TEAM | BMW S1000RR | SST | (Hungary) Bálint Kovács (Germany) Jan Bühn (Estonia) Hannes Soomer (Belgium) Loris Cresson (Germany) Jan-Ole Jähnig | 3rd |
| 2026 | (Japan) AutoRace Ube Racing Team | BMW S1000RR | EWC | (Japan) Naomichi Uramoto (France) Sylvain Guintoli (Estonia) Hannes Soomer | 5th |

==== 24 Hours of Le Mans results ====
| Year | Team | Motorcycle | Class | Riders | Pos |
|---|---|---|---|---|---|
| 2024 | (Belgium) TECMAS MRP BMW RACING TEAM | BMW S1000RR | SST | (France) Kenny Foray (Germany) Jan Bühn (France) Loic Arbel (Estonia) Hannes Soomer | DNF |
| 2026 | (Japan) AutoRace Ube Racing Team | BMW S1000RR | EWC | (Japan) Naomichi Uramoto (France) Sylvain Guintoli (Estonia) Hannes Soomer (France) Christophe Ponsson | 14th |

==== Spa 8 Hours Motos results ====
| Year | Team | Motorcycle | Class | Riders | Pos |
|---|---|---|---|---|---|
| 2025 | (Belgium) CHAMPION-MRP-TECMAS | BMW S1000RR | SST | (Germany) Jan Bühn (Estonia) Hannes Soomer (Argentina) Leandro Mercado | 1st |
| 2026 | (Japan) AutoRace Ube Racing Team | BMW S1000RR | EWC | (Japan) Naomichi Uramoto (France) Sylvain Guintoli (Estonia) Hannes Soomer | 5th |

==== Suzuka 8 Hours results ====
| Year | Team | Motorcycle | Class | Riders | Pos |
|---|---|---|---|---|---|
| 2024 | (Japan) TONE RT SYNCEDGE 4413 BMW | BMW S1000RR | SST | (Japan) Tomoya Hoshino (Japan) Ainosuke Yoshida (Estonia) Hannes Soomer | 1st |
| 2026 | (Japan) AutoRace Ube Racing Team | BMW M1000RR | EWC | (Japan) Naomichi Uramoto (France) Sylvain Guintoli (France) Christophe Ponsson (Note: Soomer had injured himself in a crash during testing for the Suzuka 8 Hours, so Ponsson was called up to replace him.) (Estonia) Hannes Soomer | 5th |

==== Bol d'Or results ====
| Year | Team | Motorcycle | Class | Riders | Pos |
|---|---|---|---|---|---|
| 2024 | (Belgium) BMW Motorrad World Endurance Team | BMW S1000RR | EWC | (Germany) Markus Reiterberger (France) Sylvain Guintoli (Estonia) Hannes Soomer | 5th |
| 2025 | (Belgium) CHAMPION-MRP-TECMAS | BMW S1000RR | SST | (Belgium) Loris Cresson (Germany) Jan-Ole Jähnig (Hungary) Bálint Kovács (Estonia) Hannes Soomer | 1st |
