= Kazuki Watanabe (motorcyclist) =

Japanese motorcycle racer

- Watanabe in 2017
- Nationality: Japanese
- Born: 2 October 1990 (age 36); Yamanashi, Japan
- Current team: Team Tatara Aprilia
- Bike number: 26
Motorcycle racing career statistics
MotoGP World Championship
Active years	2022
Manufacturers	Suzuki
2022 championship position	31st (0 pts)
Starts / Wins / Podiums / Poles / F. laps / Points; 1 / 0 / 0 / 0 / 0 / 0
Moto2 World Championship
Active years	2010
Manufacturers	Suter
Championships	0
2010 championship position	NC (0 pts)
Starts / Wins / Podiums / Poles / F. laps / Points; 4 / 0 / 0 / 0 / 0 / 0
250cc World Championship
Active years	2008–2009
Manufacturers	Yamaha
Championships	0
2009 championship position	28th (2 pts)
Starts / Wins / Podiums / Poles / F. laps / Points; 1 / 0 / 0 / 0 / 0 / 2
Supersport World Championship
Active years	2017
Manufacturers	Kawasaki
Championships	0
2017 championship position	20th (21 pts)
Starts / Wins / Podiums / Poles / F. laps / Points; 12 / 0 / 0 / 0 / 0 / 21

Kazuki Watanabe (渡辺 一樹, Watanabe Kazuki; born 2 October 1990) is a Japanese motorcycle racer who competes in the Asia Road Racing Championship for Team Tatara Aprilia, aboard an RSV4 1100. He has previously competed in various classes of the All Japan Road Race Championship such as JSB1000, GP250, and J-GP2—where he clinched a title in 2012.

== Career statistics ==
=== Grand Prix motorcycle racing ===
==== By season ====
Season	Class	Motorcycle	Team	Race	Win	Podium	Pole	FLap	Pts	Plcd
2008	250cc	Yamaha	RT Morinokumasan-Satohjuku	0	0	0	0	0	0	NC
2009	250cc	Yamaha	Bardral Racing with SJ-R	1	0	0	0	0	2	28th
2010	Moto2	Suter	Racing Team Germany	4	0	0	0	0	0	NC
2022	MotoGP	Suzuki	Team Suzuki Ecstar	1	0	0	0	0	0	31st
Total				**6**	**0**	**0**	**0**	**0**	**2**	

==== Races by year ====
(key) (Races in bold indicate pole position; races in italics indicate fastest lap)

Year	Class	Bike	1	2	3	4	5	6	7	8	9	10	11	12	13	14	15	16	17	18	19	20	Pos	Pts
2008	250cc	Yamaha	QAT	SPA	POR	CHN	FRA	ITA	CAT	GBR	NED	GER	CZE	RSM	INP	JPN; DNS	AUS	MAL	VAL				NC	0
2009	250cc	Yamaha	QAT	JPN; 14	SPA	FRA	ITA	CAT	NED	GER	GBR	CZE	INP	RSM	POR	AUS	MAL	VAL					28th	2
2010	Moto2	Suter	QAT	SPA	FRA	ITA	GBR	NED	CAT	GER	CZE	INP	RSM	ARA; 25	JPN; 25	MAL; 25	AUS; 32	POR	VAL				NC	0
2022	MotoGP	Suzuki	QAT	INA	ARG	AME	POR	SPA	FRA	ITA	CAT	GER	NED	GBR	AUT	RSM; 21	ARA	JPN	THA	AUS	MAL	VAL	31st	0

=== Supersport World Championship ===
==== Races by year ====
(key) (Races in bold indicate pole position; races in italics indicate fastest lap)

Year	Bike	1	2	3	4	5	6	7	8	9	10	11	12	Pos	Pts
2017	Kawasaki	AUS; 8	THA; 9	SPA; 15	NED; Ret	ITA; Ret	GBR; 15	ITA; 12	GER; 20	POR; Ret	FRA; Ret	SPA; 22	QAT; Ret	20th	21

=== FIM Endurance World Championship ===
==== By team ====
Year	Team	Bike	Rider	TC
2022	(Japan) Yoshimura Suzuki Endurance Racing Team	Suzuki GSX-R1000	(France) Gregg Blaxk (France) Sylvain Guintoli (Belgium) Xavier Siméon (Japan) Kazuki Watanabe	**2nd**

=== FIM Endurance World Cup ===
Year	Team	Bike	Tyre	Rider	Pts	TC
2025	(Japan) Team Étoile	BMW S1000RR	**D**	(Japan) Hikari Okubo (Japan) Kazuki Watanabe (Japan) Motoharu Ito (Japan) Kyosuke Okuda	86	5th

=== Suzuka 8 Hours results ===
Year	Class	Team	Co-riders	Bike	Pos	Class
2025	**SST**	(Japan) Team Étoile	(Japan) Hikari Okubo (Japan) Motoharu Ito	BMW S1000RR	16th	1st
2026	**SST**	(Japan) Team Tatara Aprilia	(Japan) Ruka Wada (Japan) Akito Haga	Aprilia RSV4 1100 Factory	15th	2nd

=== Asia Road Racing Championship ===
==== Races by year ====
(key) (Races in bold indicate pole position; races in italics indicate fastest lap)

Year	Bike	1		2		3		4		5		6		Pos	Pts
Year	Bike	R1	R2	R1	R2	R1	R2	R1	R2	R1	R2	R1	R2	Pos	Pts
2026	Aprilia	SEP; 10	SEP; 11	CHA; 11	CHA; 8	MOT; 10	MOT; 9	MAN; 11	MAN; 7	SEP; 10	SEP; 8	CHA	CHA	9th*	65*

=== All Japan Road Race Championship ===
==== Races by year ====
(key) (Races in bold indicate pole position; races in italics indicate fastest lap)

Year	Class	Bike	1	2	3	4	5	6	7	8	9	10	11	Pos	Pts
2024	JSB1000	Honda	SUZ; Ret	MOT1	MOT2	SUG1	SUG2	MOT	AUT1	AUT2	OKA	SUZ1	SUZ2	NC	0

== Personal life ==
On January 21, 2026, Watanabe announced his marriage to former SKE48 member, talent, and fellow motorcycle racer Madoka Umemoto.
