= 2020 Superbike World Championship =

2020 Superbike World Championship
Previous:	2019	Next:	2021
Support series: Supersport World Championship; Supersport 300 World Championship

The 2020 Motul FIM Superbike World Championship was the 33rd season of the Superbike World Championship.

== Race calendar and results ==
The 2020 season calendar was announced on 21 November 2019, with 13 rounds scheduled. The championship visited Circuit de Barcelona-Catalunya (on 19 and 20 September) for the first time, and a round was due to be staged at Oschersleben – on 1 and 2 August – for the first time since 2004. Due to the coronavirus pandemic, the Losail round was postponed to an unannounced date and the Jerez, Assen, Aragon and Misano rounds were rescheduled to a later date, while the Imola and Oschersleben rounds were cancelled. As a result of updates made to the MotoGP calendar for the same reason, the French round date was also affected. Despite having already been rescheduled, the Assen round was later postponed to a to-be-determined date, along with the Donington round.

On 19 June, an updated calendar was published; for the restart, Jerez and Portimão were brought forward from their respective dates and a second round at Aragon was added to the schedule. Other five rounds—the first at Aragon, as well as Barcelona, Magny-Cours, San Juan and Misano—either kept their original or revised dates, although the latter two events were labelled as 'to be confirmed'. Three rounds—Losail, Donington and Assen—were included without a confirmed date and were subsequently cancelled on 24 July. The San Juan round was cancelled on the 13 August whilst the Misano round was cancelled and replaced by a round in Estoril on 18 August. It was the first time since 1993 that the championship raced at Estoril.

2020 Superbike World Championship Calendar
Round			Circuit	Date	Superpole	Fastest lap	Winning rider	Winning team
1	R1	(Australia) Yamaha Financial Services Australian Round	Phillip Island Grand Prix Circuit	29 February	(United Kingdom) Tom Sykes	(United Kingdom) Jonathan Rea	(Turkey) Toprak Razgatlıoğlu	Pata Yamaha WorldSBK Official Team
1	SR	(Australia) Yamaha Financial Services Australian Round	Phillip Island Grand Prix Circuit	1 March	(United Kingdom) Tom Sykes	(United Kingdom) Scott Redding	(United Kingdom) Jonathan Rea	Kawasaki Racing Team WorldSBK
1	R2	(Australia) Yamaha Financial Services Australian Round	Phillip Island Grand Prix Circuit	1 March		(United Kingdom) Scott Redding	(United Kingdom) Alex Lowes	Kawasaki Racing Team WorldSBK
2	R1	(Spain) Pirelli Spanish Round	Circuito de Jerez	1 August (Note: The Jerez round was originally due to take place on 27–29 March 2020. It was first postponed to 23–25 October and later moved to 31 July–2 August in response to the COVID-19 pandemic.)	(United Kingdom) Scott Redding	(United Kingdom) Jonathan Rea	(United Kingdom) Scott Redding	Aruba.it Racing – Ducati
2	SR	(Spain) Pirelli Spanish Round	Circuito de Jerez	2 August	(United Kingdom) Scott Redding	(United Kingdom) Jonathan Rea	(United Kingdom) Jonathan Rea	Kawasaki Racing Team WorldSBK
2	R2	(Spain) Pirelli Spanish Round	Circuito de Jerez	2 August		(United Kingdom) Scott Redding	(United Kingdom) Scott Redding	Aruba.it Racing – Ducati
3	R1	(Portugal) Motul Portuguese Round	Algarve International Circuit	8 August (Note: The Portimão round was originally due to take place on 4–6 September 2020. It was moved to 7–9 August in response to the COVID-19 pandemic.)	(United Kingdom) Jonathan Rea	(United Kingdom) Jonathan Rea	(United Kingdom) Jonathan Rea	Kawasaki Racing Team WorldSBK
3	SR	(Portugal) Motul Portuguese Round	Algarve International Circuit	9 August	(United Kingdom) Jonathan Rea	(United Kingdom) Jonathan Rea	(United Kingdom) Jonathan Rea	Kawasaki Racing Team WorldSBK
3	R2	(Portugal) Motul Portuguese Round	Algarve International Circuit	9 August		(United Kingdom) Jonathan Rea	(United Kingdom) Jonathan Rea	Kawasaki Racing Team WorldSBK
4	R1	(Aragon) Aragón Round	MotorLand Aragón	29 August (Note: The Aragon round was originally due to take place on 22–24 May 2020. It was postponed to 28–30 August in response to the COVID-19 pandemic.)	(United Kingdom) Jonathan Rea	(United Kingdom) Chaz Davies	(United Kingdom) Scott Redding	Aruba.it Racing – Ducati
4	SR	(Aragon) Aragón Round	MotorLand Aragón	30 August	(United Kingdom) Jonathan Rea	(United Kingdom) Jonathan Rea	(United Kingdom) Jonathan Rea	Kawasaki Racing Team WorldSBK
4	R2	(Aragon) Aragón Round	MotorLand Aragón	30 August		(United Kingdom) Jonathan Rea	(United Kingdom) Jonathan Rea	Kawasaki Racing Team WorldSBK
5	R1	(Province of Teruel) Teruel Round	MotorLand Aragón	5 September (Note: The second Aragon round was added to the calendar on 19 June 2020.)	(United Kingdom) Jonathan Rea	(Italy) Michael Ruben Rinaldi	(Italy) Michael Ruben Rinaldi	Team GoEleven
5	SR	(Province of Teruel) Teruel Round	MotorLand Aragón	6 September	(United Kingdom) Jonathan Rea	(United Kingdom) Alex Lowes	(United Kingdom) Scott Redding	Aruba.it Racing – Ducati
5	R2	(Province of Teruel) Teruel Round	MotorLand Aragón	6 September		(Italy) Michael Ruben Rinaldi	(United Kingdom) Jonathan Rea	Kawasaki Racing Team WorldSBK
6	R1	(Catalonia) Acerbis Catalunya Round	Circuit de Barcelona-Catalunya	19 September	(United Kingdom) Jonathan Rea	(United Kingdom) Jonathan Rea	(United Kingdom) Jonathan Rea	Kawasaki Racing Team WorldSBK
6	SR	(Catalonia) Acerbis Catalunya Round	Circuit de Barcelona-Catalunya	20 September	(United Kingdom) Jonathan Rea	(Spain) Álvaro Bautista	(Netherlands) Michael van der Mark	Pata Yamaha WorldSBK Official Team
6	R2	(Catalonia) Acerbis Catalunya Round	Circuit de Barcelona-Catalunya	20 September		(United Kingdom) Chaz Davies	(United Kingdom) Chaz Davies	Aruba.it Racing – Ducati
7	R1	(France) Pirelli French	Circuit de Nevers Magny-Cours	3 October (Note: The Magny-Cours round was originally due to take place on 25–27 September 2020. It was postponed to 2–4 October in response to the COVID-19 pandemic.)	(Republic of Ireland) Eugene Laverty	(United Kingdom) Jonathan Rea	(United Kingdom) Jonathan Rea	Kawasaki Racing Team WorldSBK
7	SR	(France) Pirelli French	Circuit de Nevers Magny-Cours	4 October	(Republic of Ireland) Eugene Laverty	(United Kingdom) Jonathan Rea	(United Kingdom) Jonathan Rea	Kawasaki Racing Team WorldSBK
7	R2	(France) Pirelli French	Circuit de Nevers Magny-Cours	4 October		(France) Loris Baz	(United Kingdom) Scott Redding	Aruba.it Racing – Ducati
8	R1	(Portugal) Estoril Round	Circuito do Estoril	17 October (Note: The Estoril round was added to the calendar on 18 August 2020. It replaced the Misano round which was cancelled in response to the COVID-19 pandemic.)	(Turkey) Toprak Razgatlıoğlu	(Netherlands) Michael van der Mark	(Turkey) Toprak Razgatlıoğlu	Pata Yamaha WorldSBK Official Team
8	SR	(Portugal) Estoril Round	Circuito do Estoril	18 October	(Turkey) Toprak Razgatlıoğlu	(Turkey) Toprak Razgatlıoğlu	(Turkey) Toprak Razgatlıoğlu	Pata Yamaha WorldSBK Official Team
8	R2	(Portugal) Estoril Round	Circuito do Estoril	18 October		(United Kingdom) Chaz Davies	(United Kingdom) Chaz Davies	Aruba.it Racing – Ducati
Races under contract to run in 2020, but cancelled:
—	R1	Qatar	Losail International Circuit	N/A (Note: The Losail round was originally due to take place on 13–15 March 2020. It was postponed to an unannounced date and subsequently cancelled in response to the COVID-19 pandemic.)	—N/a			
—	SR	Qatar	Losail International Circuit	N/A	—N/a			
—	R2	Qatar	Losail International Circuit	N/A	—N/a			
—	R1	Netherlands	TT Circuit Assen	N/A (Note: The Assen round was originally due to take place on 17–19 April 2020. It was postponed first to 21–23 August, later to an unannounced date and subsequently cancelled in response to the COVID-19 pandemic.)	—N/a			
—	SR	Netherlands	TT Circuit Assen	N/A	—N/a			
—	R2	Netherlands	TT Circuit Assen	N/A	—N/a			
—	R1	Italy	Autodromo Enzo e Dino Ferrari	N/A (Note: The Imola round was originally due to take place on 8–10 May 2020. It was cancelled in response to the COVID-19 pandemic.)	—N/a			
—	SR	Italy	Autodromo Enzo e Dino Ferrari	N/A	—N/a			
—	R2	Italy	Autodromo Enzo e Dino Ferrari	N/A	—N/a			
—	R1	United Kingdom	Donington Park	N/A (Note: The Donington round was originally due to take place on 3–5 July 2020. It was postponed to an unannounced date and subsequently cancelled in response to the COVID-19 pandemic.)	—N/a			
—	SR	United Kingdom	Donington Park	N/A	—N/a			
—	R2	United Kingdom	Donington Park	N/A	—N/a			
—	R1	Germany	Motorsport Arena Oschersleben	N/A (Note: The Oschersleben round was originally due to take place on 31 July–2 August 2020. It was cancelled in response to the COVID-19 pandemic.)	—N/a			
—	SR	Germany	Motorsport Arena Oschersleben	N/A	—N/a			
—	R2	Germany	Motorsport Arena Oschersleben	N/A	—N/a			
—	R1	Argentina	Circuito San Juan Villicum	N/A (Note: The Argentina round was originally due to take place on 9–11 October 2020. It was cancelled on 13 August 2020 in response to the COVID-19 pandemic.)	—N/a			
—	SR	Argentina	Circuito San Juan Villicum	N/A	—N/a			
—	R2	Argentina	Circuito San Juan Villicum	N/A	—N/a			
—	R1	(Italy) Riviera di Rimini	Misano World Circuit Marco Simoncelli	N/A (Note: The Misano round was originally due to take place on 12–14 June 2020. It was initially postponed to 6–8 November, but was later cancelled on 18 August 2020 in response to the COVID-19 pandemic.)	—N/a			
—	SR	(Italy) Riviera di Rimini	Misano World Circuit Marco Simoncelli	N/A	—N/a			
—	R2	(Italy) Riviera di Rimini	Misano World Circuit Marco Simoncelli	N/A	—N/a			

== Entry list ==
2020 entry list
Team	Constructor	Motorcycle	No.	Rider	Rounds
(Japan) Kawasaki Racing Team WorldSBK	Kawasaki	Ninja ZX-10RR	1	(United Kingdom) Jonathan Rea	All
(Japan) Kawasaki Racing Team WorldSBK	Kawasaki	Ninja ZX-10RR	22	(United Kingdom) Alex Lowes	All
(Italy) Barni Racing Team	Ducati	Panigale V4 R	2	(United Kingdom) Leon Camier	1
(Italy) Barni Racing Team	Ducati	Panigale V4 R	33	(Italy) Marco Melandri	2–5
(Italy) Barni Racing Team	Ducati	Panigale V4 R	71	(Italy) Matteo Ferrari	8
(Italy) Barni Racing Team	Ducati	Panigale V4 R	97	(Italy) Samuele Cavalieri	6–7
(Italy) Aruba.it Racing – Ducati	Ducati	Panigale V4 R	7	(United Kingdom) Chaz Davies	All
(Italy) Aruba.it Racing – Ducati	Ducati	Panigale V4 R	45	(United Kingdom) Scott Redding	All
(Italy) Outdo Kawasaki TPR	Kawasaki	Ninja ZX-10RR	11	(Germany) Sandro Cortese	1–3
(Italy) Outdo Kawasaki TPR	Kawasaki	Ninja ZX-10RR	40	(Spain) Román Ramos	4–5
(Italy) Outdo Kawasaki TPR	Kawasaki	Ninja ZX-10RR	53	(France) Valentin Debise	6–7
(Italy) Outdo Kawasaki TPR	Kawasaki	Ninja ZX-10RR	84	(Belgium) Loris Cresson	8
(Italy) Kawasaki Puccetti Racing	Kawasaki	Ninja ZX-10RR	12	(Spain) Javier Forés	All
(Italy) MIE Racing Althea Honda Team (Japan) MIE Racing Honda Team	Honda	CBR1000RR-R	13	(Japan) Takumi Takahashi	All
(Italy) MIE Racing Althea Honda Team (Japan) MIE Racing Honda Team	Honda	CBR1000RR-R	51	(Brazil) Eric Granado	8
(Italy) MIE Racing Althea Honda Team (Japan) MIE Racing Honda Team	Honda	CBR1000RR-R	63	(Italy) Lorenzo Gabellini (Note: Jordi Torres was announced as a MIE Racing Althea Honda Team rider from the Jerez round onwards in February 2020, before the COVID-19 pandemic-related calendar changes; he was replaced by Lorenzo Gabellini in July 2020, before the season resumption.)	2–4
(Japan) Team HRC	Honda	CBR1000RR-R	19	(Spain) Álvaro Bautista	All
(Japan) Team HRC	Honda	CBR1000RR-R	91	(United Kingdom) Leon Haslam	All
(Switzerland) Brixx Performance	Ducati	Panigale V4 R	20	(France) Sylvain Barrier	2–8
(Italy) Team GoEleven	Ducati	Panigale V4 R	21	(Italy) Michael Ruben Rinaldi	All
(France) Nuova M2 Racing	Aprilia	RSV4 1000	23	(France) Christophe Ponsson	2–4
(Italy) GRT Yamaha WorldSBK Junior Team	Yamaha	YZF-R1	31	(United States) Garrett Gerloff	All
(Italy) GRT Yamaha WorldSBK Junior Team	Yamaha	YZF-R1	64	(Italy) Federico Caricasulo	All
(Spain) Orelac Racing VerdNatura	Kawasaki	Ninja ZX-10RR	32	(Portugal) Sheridan Morais	8
(Spain) Orelac Racing VerdNatura	Kawasaki	Ninja ZX-10RR	34	(Spain) Xavier Pinsach	7
(Spain) Orelac Racing VerdNatura	Kawasaki	Ninja ZX-10RR	77	(Chile) Maximilian Scheib	1–6
(Italy) Motocorsa Racing	Ducati	Panigale V4 R	36	(Argentina) Leandro Mercado	2–4, 6–8 (Note: Leandro Mercado competed in the first Friday practice session during round 6, before being replaced on Saturday by Lorenzo Zanetti.)
(Italy) Motocorsa Racing	Ducati	Panigale V4 R	71	(Italy) Matteo Ferrari	5
(Italy) Motocorsa Racing	Ducati	Panigale V4 R	87	(Italy) Lorenzo Zanetti	6
(Germany) BMW Motorrad WorldSBK Team	BMW	S1000RR	50	(Republic of Ireland) Eugene Laverty	All
(Germany) BMW Motorrad WorldSBK Team	BMW	S1000RR	66	(United Kingdom) Tom Sykes	All
(Japan) Pata Yamaha WorldSBK Official Team	Yamaha	YZF-R1	54	(Turkey) Toprak Razgatlıoğlu	All
(Japan) Pata Yamaha WorldSBK Official Team	Yamaha	YZF-R1	60	(Netherlands) Michael van der Mark	All
(Netherlands) Ten Kate Racing Yamaha	Yamaha	YZF-R1	76	(France) Loris Baz	All
(Germany) Bonovo Action by MGM Racing	Yamaha	YZF-R1	94	(Germany) Jonas Folger	6, 8

Key
Regular rider
Wildcard rider
Replacement rider

- All entries used Pirelli tyres.

== Championship standings ==
Points were awarded as follows:

Race 1 and Race 2

Position	**1st**	**2nd**	**3rd**	**4th**	**5th**	**6th**	**7th**	**8th**	**9th**	**10th**	**11th**	**12th**	**13th**	**14th**	**15th**
Points	25	20	16	13	11	10	9	8	7	6	5	4	3	2	1

Superpole Race

Position	**1st**	**2nd**	**3rd**	**4th**	**5th**	**6th**	**7th**	**8th**	**9th**
Points	12	9	7	6	5	4	3	2	1

=== Riders' championship ===
Pos.	Rider	Bike	PHI (Australia)			JER (Spain)			POR (Portugal)			ARA (Spain)			ARA (Spain)			BAR (Spain)			MAG (France)			EST (Portugal)			Pts.
Pos.	Rider	Bike	R1	SR	R2	R1	SR	R2	R1	SR	R2	R1	SR	R2	R1	SR	R2	R1	SR	R2	R1	SR	R2	R1	SR	R2	Pts.
1	(United Kingdom) Jonathan Rea	Kawasaki	Ret	1	2	2	1	6	**1**	**1**	1	**3**	**1**	1	**2**	**2**	1	**1**	**2**	4	1	1	4	4	5	14	360
2	(United Kingdom) Scott Redding	Ducati	3	3	3	**1**	**2**	1	7	5	2	1	2	4	Ret	1	3	2	8	6	5	4	1	Ret	6	2	305
3	(United Kingdom) Chaz Davies	Ducati	8	13	5	4	5	2	11	Ret	4	2	5	2	3	5	Ret	3	4	1	4	5	3	2	4	1	273
4	(Turkey) Toprak Razgatlıoğlu	Yamaha	1	2	Ret	3	Ret	3	2	2	8	6	7	8	5	7	7	6	DNS	DNS	6	9	9	**1**	**1**	3	228
5	(Netherlands) Michael van der Mark	Yamaha	4	5	4	Ret	3	7	3	7	3	5	3	6	4	10	6	4	1	2	9	3	5	Ret	3	4	223
6	(United Kingdom) Alex Lowes	Kawasaki	2	4	1	9	7	5	4	4	Ret	Ret	6	9	6	6	5	9	7	8	3	2	7	6	Ret	Ret	189
7	(Italy) Michael Ruben Rinaldi	Ducati	10	9	NC	6	11	4	5	8	6	4	8	5	1	3	2	7	6	Ret	7	7	6	7	9	6	186
8	(France) Loris Baz	Yamaha	7	7	8	5	4	17	6	3	Ret	7	9	Ret	12	11	8	14	3	10	2	6	2	9	Ret	Ret	142
9	(Spain) Álvaro Bautista	Honda	6	16	6	7	10	8	9	11	5	Ret	4	3	Ret	4	Ret	5	Ret	Ret	12	14	15	17	7	5	113
10	(United Kingdom) Leon Haslam	Honda	5	8	12	10	9	12	12	9	13	10	10	7	7	8	4	10	Ret	9	Ret	11	13	5	8	7	113
11	(United States) Garrett Gerloff	Yamaha	14	DNS	DNS	11	8	10	14	10	11	Ret	13	10	11	13	10	8	5	3	Ret	8	8	3	2	Ret	103
12	(United Kingdom) Tom Sykes	BMW	**9**	**6**	10	NC	6	11	8	6	7	Ret	15	12	10	9	Ret	Ret	9	5	Ret	20	10	10	11	10	88
13	(Spain) Javier Forés	Kawasaki	Ret	12	11	13	12	13	13	13	Ret	8	12	11	13	16	13	13	12	15	8	12	Ret	8	10	8	61
14	(Italy) Federico Caricasulo	Yamaha	12	14	Ret	Ret	16	16	15	12	9	9	11	13	9	12	9	15	Ret	12	11	Ret	11	Ret	12	9	58
15	(Republic of Ireland) Eugene Laverty	BMW	11	DNS	DNS	15	13	Ret	10	20	12	16	16	14	8	14	11	11	11	7	**Ret**	**15**	14	12	16	12	55
16	(Argentina) Leandro Mercado	Ducati				Ret	17	15	16	14	10	11	Ret	DNS				WD	WD	WD	10	10	Ret	13	14	13	24
17	(Italy) Marco Melandri	Ducati				8	18	9	17	15	14	14	17	Ret	Ret	17	12										23
18	(Germany) Jonas Folger	Yamaha																12	10	11				11	13	11	19
19	(Germany) Sandro Cortese	Kawasaki	13	11	9	14	14	14	Ret	DNS	DNS																14
20	(France) Sylvain Barrier	Ducati				16	21	Ret	18	16	15	12	18	16	Ret	19	Ret	18	15	Ret	13	13	12	DNS	DNS	DNS	12
21	(Chile) Maximilian Scheib	Kawasaki	15	10	7	Ret	15	18	21	Ret	Ret	Ret	14	15	16	15	Ret	DNS	DNS	DNS							11
22	(Japan) Takumi Takahashi	Honda	Ret	15	Ret	18	22	Ret	19	19	18	15	20	18	15	21	16	19	16	14	17	19	18	14	17	17	6
23	(Italy) Matteo Ferrari	Ducati													14	18	14							Ret	15	15	5
24	(France) Christophe Ponsson	Aprilia				12	19	Ret	Ret	17	16	Ret	NC	17													4
25	(Spain) Román Ramos	Kawasaki										13	19	Ret	Ret	20	15										4
26	(Italy) Lorenzo Zanetti	Ducati																17	13	13							3
27	(France) Valentin Debise	Kawasaki																20	14	Ret	14	16	17				2
28	(Brazil) Eric Granado	Honda																						15	18	16	1
29	(Spain) Xavier Pinsach	Kawasaki																			15	18	Ret				1
	(Italy) Samuele Cavalieri	Ducati																16	Ret	Ret	16	17	16				0
	(Portugal) Sheridan Morais	Kawasaki																						16	19	18	0
	(Italy) Lorenzo Gabellini	Honda				17	20	19	20	18	17	17	21	19													0
	(Belgium) Loris Cresson	Kawasaki																						18	20	19	0
	(United Kingdom) Leon Camier	Ducati	DNS	DNS	DNS																						0
Pos.	Rider	Bike	PHI (Australia)			JER (Spain)			POR (Portugal)			ARA (Spain)			ARA (Spain)			BAR (Spain)			MAG (France)			EST (Portugal)			Pts.

Colour	Result
Gold	Winner
Silver	Second place
Bronze	Third place
Green	Points classification
Blue	Non-points classification
Blue	Non-classified finish (NC)
Purple	Retired, not classified (Ret)
Red	Did not qualify (DNQ)
Red	Did not pre-qualify (DNPQ)
Black	Disqualified (DSQ)
White	Did not start (DNS)
White	Withdrew (WD)
White	Race cancelled (C)
Blank	Did not practice (DNP)
Blank	Did not arrive (DNA)
Blank	Excluded (EX)

**Bold** – Pole position
Italics – Fastest lap

=== Manufacturers' championship ===
Pos.	Manufacturer	PHI (Australia)			JER (Spain)			POR (Portugal)			ARA (Spain)			ARA (Spain)			BAR (Spain)			MAG (France)			EST (Portugal)			Pts.
Pos.	Manufacturer	R1	SR	R2	R1	SR	R2	R1	SR	R2	R1	SR	R2	R1	SR	R2	R1	SR	R2	R1	SR	R2	R1	SR	R2	Pts.
1	(Japan) Kawasaki	2	1	1	2	1	5	1	1	1	3	1	1	2	2	1	1	2	4	1	1	4	4	5	8	392
2	(Italy) Ducati	3	3	3	1	2	1	5	5	2	1	2	2	1	1	2	2	4	1	4	4	1	2	4	1	391
3	(Japan) Yamaha	1	2	4	3	3	3	2	2	3	5	3	6	4	7	6	4	1	2	2	3	2	1	1	3	330
4	(Japan) Honda	5	8	6	7	9	8	9	9	5	10	4	3	7	4	4	5	16	9	12	11	13	5	7	5	166
5	(Germany) BMW	9	6	10	15	6	11	8	6	7	16	15	12	8	9	11	11	9	5	Ret	15	10	10	11	10	101
6	(Italy) Aprilia				12	19	Ret	Ret	17	16	Ret	NC	17													4
Pos.	Manufacturer	PHI (Australia)			JER (Spain)			POR (Portugal)			ARA (Spain)			ARA (Spain)			BAR (Spain)			MAG (France)			EST (Portugal)			Pts.
