= 2019 Supersport World Championship =

2019 Supersport World Championship
Previous:	2018	Next:	2020
Support series: Superbike World Championship; Supersport 300 World Championship

The 2019 Supersport World Championship season was the twenty-third season of the Supersport World Championship, the twenty-first held under this name.

== Race calendar and results ==
2019 calendar
Rnd	Country	Circuit	Date	Superpole	Fastest lap	Winning rider	Winning team
1	Australia	Phillip Island Grand Prix Circuit	24 February	(Italy) Federico Caricasulo	(Switzerland) Randy Krummenacher	(Switzerland) Randy Krummenacher	BARDAHL Evan Bros. WorldSSP Team
2	Thailand	Chang International Circuit	17 March	(France) Jules Cluzel	(Switzerland) Randy Krummenacher	(France) Jules Cluzel	GMT94 Yamaha
3	Spain	Motorland Aragón	7 April	(Austria) Thomas Gradinger	(Italy) Raffaele De Rosa	(Switzerland) Randy Krummenacher	BARDAHL Evan Bros. WorldSSP Team
4	Netherlands	TT Circuit Assen	14 April	(Switzerland) Randy Krummenacher	(France) Lucas Mahias	(Italy) Federico Caricasulo	BARDAHL Evan Bros. WorldSSP Team
5	Italy	Autodromo Enzo e Dino Ferrari	12 May	(Switzerland) Randy Krummenacher	(Switzerland) Randy Krummenacher	(Switzerland) Randy Krummenacher	BARDAHL Evan Bros. WorldSSP Team
6	Spain	Circuito de Jerez	9 June	(Switzerland) Randy Krummenacher	(Italy) Federico Caricasulo	(Italy) Federico Caricasulo	BARDAHL Evan Bros. WorldSSP Team
7	Italy	Misano World Circuit Marco Simoncelli	23 June	(France) Lucas Mahias	(Italy) Federico Caricasulo	(Switzerland) Randy Krummenacher	BARDAHL Evan Bros. WorldSSP Team
8	United Kingdom	Donington Park	7 July	(Italy) Federico Caricasulo	(Italy) Federico Caricasulo	(France) Jules Cluzel	GMT94 Yamaha
9	Portugal	Algarve International Circuit	8 September	(Italy) Federico Caricasulo	(Switzerland) Randy Krummenacher	(Italy) Federico Caricasulo	BARDAHL Evan Bros. WorldSSP Team
10	France	Circuit de Nevers Magny-Cours	29 September	(United Kingdom) Kyle Smith	(Spain) Isaac Viñales	(France) Lucas Mahias	Kawasaki Puccetti Racing
11	Argentina	Circuito San Juan Villicum	13 October	(France) Corentin Perolari	(France) Lucas Mahias	(France) Jules Cluzel	GMT94 Yamaha
12	Qatar	Losail International Circuit	26 October	(Italy) Federico Caricasulo	(France) Lucas Mahias	(France) Lucas Mahias	Kawasaki Puccetti Racing

== Entry list ==
2019 entry list
Team	Constructor	Motorcycle	No.	Rider	Rounds
Appleyard Macadam Integro	Yamaha	Yamaha YZF-R6	2	(United Kingdom) Brad Jones	8
Appleyard Macadam Integro	Yamaha	Yamaha YZF-R6	14	(Republic of Ireland) Jack Kennedy	8
Team Tóth; Team Tóth by Willirace	Yamaha	Yamaha YZF-R6	2	(United Kingdom) Brad Jones	12
Team Tóth; Team Tóth by Willirace	Yamaha	Yamaha YZF-R6	15	(Italy) Alfonso Coppola	11
Team Tóth; Team Tóth by Willirace	Yamaha	Yamaha YZF-R6	40	(Hungary) Alen Győrfi	6–9
Team Tóth; Team Tóth by Willirace	Yamaha	Yamaha YZF-R6	61	(Italy) Gabriele Ruiu	5, 10
Team Tóth; Team Tóth by Willirace	Yamaha	Yamaha YZF-R6	80	(Spain) Héctor Barberá	1–3
MV Agusta Reparto Corse	MV Agusta	MV Agusta F3 675	3	(Italy) Raffaele De Rosa	All
MV Agusta Reparto Corse	MV Agusta	MV Agusta F3 675	20	(Italy) Filippo Fuligni	11–12
MV Agusta Reparto Corse	MV Agusta	MV Agusta F3 675	22	(Italy) Federico Fuligni	1–10
GEMAR – Ciociaria Corse WorldSSP Team	Honda	Honda CBR600RR	4	(Germany) Christian Stange	2–12
GEMAR – Ciociaria Corse WorldSSP Team	Honda	Honda CBR600RR	15	(Italy) Alfonso Coppola	1–5
GEMAR – Ciociaria Corse WorldSSP Team	Honda	Honda CBR600RR	53	(Italy) Gianluca Sconza	6–12
GEMAR – Ciociaria Corse WorldSSP Team	Honda	Honda CBR600RR	61	(Italy) Gabriele Ruiu	1
MS Racing	Yamaha	Yamaha YZF-R6	6	(Spain) María Herrera	1–7
MS Racing	Yamaha	Yamaha YZF-R6	31	(Spain) Daniel Valle	9–12
MS Racing	Yamaha	Yamaha YZF-R6	66	(Spain) Álex Toledo	8
Kallio Racing	Yamaha	Yamaha YZF-R6	6	(Spain) María Herrera	9
Kallio Racing	Yamaha	Yamaha YZF-R6	32	(Spain) Isaac Viñales	All
Kallio Racing	Yamaha	Yamaha YZF-R6	36	(Austria) Thomas Gradinger	1–8, 10–12
Kallio Racing	Yamaha	Yamaha YZF-R6	84	(Belgium) Loris Cresson	All
Landbridge Transport Yamaha	Yamaha	Yamaha YZF-R6	7	(Australia) Tom Toparis	1
GMT94 Yamaha	Yamaha	Yamaha YZF-R6	9	(France) Maximilien Bau	10
GMT94 Yamaha	Yamaha	Yamaha YZF-R6	16	(France) Jules Cluzel	All
GMT94 Yamaha	Yamaha	Yamaha YZF-R6	94	(France) Corentin Perolari	All
Orelac Racing VerdNatura	Kawasaki	Kawasaki ZX-6R	10	(Spain) Nacho Calero	All
Team Pedercini Racing	Kawasaki	Kawasaki ZX-6R	11	(United Kingdom) Kyle Smith	11–12
Team Pedercini Racing	Kawasaki	Kawasaki ZX-6R	86	(Italy) Ayrton Badovini	All
SGM Tecnic	Yamaha	Yamaha YZF-R6	12	(Italy) Luca Ottaviani	5, 7
Team GREEN SPEED	Kawasaki	Kawasaki ZX-6R	13	(Italy) Roberto Rolfo	7
Team Rosso e Nero	Yamaha	Yamaha YZF-R6	20	(Italy) Filippo Fuligni	7
Team Rosso e Nero	Yamaha	Yamaha YZF-R6	33	(Italy) Kevin Manfredi	7
BARDAHL Evan Bros. WorldSSP Team	Yamaha	Yamaha YZF-R6	21	(Switzerland) Randy Krummenacher	All
BARDAHL Evan Bros. WorldSSP Team	Yamaha	Yamaha YZF-R6	27	(Italy) Mattia Casadei	7
BARDAHL Evan Bros. WorldSSP Team	Yamaha	Yamaha YZF-R6	64	(Italy) Federico Caricasulo	All
EMPERADOR Racing Team	Yamaha	Yamaha YZF-R6	23	(France) Loïc Arbel	6
EMPERADOR Racing Team	Yamaha	Yamaha YZF-R6	39	(Spain) Borja Quero	6
Go4Racing	Yamaha	Yamaha YZF-R6	24	(Belgium) Arne De Wintere	4
Hobelsberger Racing	Yamaha	Yamaha YZF-R6	26	(Germany) Patrick Hobelsberger	7
QMMF Racing Team	Yamaha	Yamaha YZF-R6	29	(Qatar) Saeed Al Sulaiti	12
EAB Racing Team	Kawasaki	Kawasaki ZX-6R	30	(Netherlands) Glenn van Straalen	All
MPM WILSport Racedays	Honda	Honda CBR600RR	38	(Estonia) Hannes Soomer	1–8, 10–12
MPM WILSport Racedays	Honda	Honda CBR600RR	61	(Italy) Gabriele Ruiu	9
MPM WILSport Racedays	Honda	Honda CBR600RR	74	(Netherlands) Jaimie van Sikkelerus	All
Rubin Racing Team	Yamaha	Yamaha YZF-R6	43	(Germany) Daniel Rubin	4
Kawasaki Puccetti Racing	Kawasaki	Kawasaki ZX-6R	44	(France) Lucas Mahias	All
Kawasaki Puccetti Racing	Kawasaki	Kawasaki ZX-6R	78	(Japan) Hikari Okubo	All
YAMAHA PTT Lubricants TANN Racing	Yamaha	Yamaha YZF-R6	46	(Thailand) Ratchada Nakcharoensri	2
Team Hartog – Against Cancer	Kawasaki	Kawasaki ZX-6R	47	(Netherlands) Rob Hartog	All
Altogoo Racing Team	Yamaha	Yamaha YZF-R6	48	(France) Xavier Navand	10
Team Rosso Corsa	Yamaha	Yamaha YZF-R6	55	(Italy) Massimo Roccoli	5, 7
CIA Landlord Insurance Honda	Honda	Honda CBR600RR	56	(Hungary) Péter Sebestyén	All
CIA Landlord Insurance Honda	Honda	Honda CBR600RR	95	(France) Jules Danilo	All
GOMMA Racing	Yamaha	Yamaha YZF-R6	60	(Italy) Lorenzo Gabellini	7
Team MHP Racing–Patrick Pons	Yamaha	Yamaha YZF-R6	69	(France) Guillaume Pot	10
H43 Team Nobby Talasur–Blumaq	Yamaha	Yamaha YZF-R6	71	(Spain) Miquel Pons	9
Team SWPN	Yamaha	Yamaha YZF-R6	77	(Netherlands) Wayne Tessels	4
FIM Europe Supersport Cup entries
Team Pedercini Racing	Kawasaki	Kawasaki ZX-6R	11	(United Kingdom) Kyle Smith	3–10
DK Motorsport	Yamaha	Yamaha YZF-R6	34	(Italy) Fabio Massei	5
DK Motorsport	Yamaha	Yamaha YZF-R6	48	(France) Xavier Navand	3–4
DK Motorsport	Yamaha	Yamaha YZF-R6	65	(Italy) Michael Canducci	6–7, 9
Flembbo Leader Team	Kawasaki	Kawasaki ZX-6R	67	(France) Gaëtan Matern	3–6, 8–10
Flembbo Leader Team	Kawasaki	Kawasaki ZX-6R	76	(Italy) Alex Bernardi	7

Key
Regular rider
Wildcard rider
Replacement rider

- All entries used Pirelli tyres.

== Championship standings ==
Points

Position	**1st**	**2nd**	**3rd**	**4th**	**5th**	**6th**	**7th**	**8th**	**9th**	**10th**	**11th**	**12th**	**13th**	**14th**	**15th**
Points	25	20	16	13	11	10	9	8	7	6	5	4	3	2	1

=== Riders' championship ===
Pos.	Rider	Bike	PHI (Australia)	CHA (Thailand)	ARA (Spain)	ASS (Netherlands)	IMO (Italy)	JER (Spain)	MIS (Italy)	DON (United Kingdom)	POR (Portugal)	MAG (France)	VIL (Argentina)	LOS (Qatar)	Pts.
1	(Switzerland) Randy Krummenacher	Yamaha	1	2	1	**2**	**1**	**2**	1	4	2	Ret	7	5	213
2	(Italy) Federico Caricasulo	Yamaha	**3**	3	3	1	2	1	2	**2**	**1**	Ret	5	**4**	207
3	(France) Jules Cluzel	Yamaha	2	**1**	5	4	7	3	4	1	4	6	1	2	200
4	(France) Lucas Mahias	Kawasaki	12	8	7	5	8	6	**3**	3	3	1	2	1	168
5	(Japan) Hikari Okubo	Kawasaki	6	6	8	7	4	7	5	13	7	5	12	8	105
6	(Italy) Raffaele De Rosa	MV Agusta	18	5	2	Ret	3	5	Ret	5	Ret	4	6	7	101
7	(Spain) Isaac Viñales	Yamaha	Ret	4	10	8	6	8	27	22	Ret	2	3	3	97
8	(France) Corentin Perolari	Yamaha	7	11	6	6	DNS	9	Ret	8	6	7	**4**	6	91
9	(Austria) Thomas Gradinger	Yamaha	5	Ret	**4**	3	Ret	4	9	6		8	8	12	90
10	(Italy) Ayrton Badovini	Kawasaki	15	Ret	Ret	11	5	13	Ret	10	5	3	10	10	65
11	(Hungary) Péter Sebestyén	Honda	8	12	11	12	10	10	16	11	11	10	11	11	59
12	(Belgium) Loris Cresson	Yamaha	10	9	14	13	12	12	13	Ret	9	13	14	DNS	41
13	(France) Jules Danilo	Honda	9	Ret	12	10	11	Ret	14	21	8	12	16	13	39
14	(Estonia) Hannes Soomer	Honda	Ret	10	17	Ret	9	11	7	15		11	15	14	36
15	(United Kingdom) Kyle Smith	Kawasaki			9	Ret	13	Ret	19	Ret	Ret	**9**	9	9	31
16	(Spain) Héctor Barberá	Yamaha	4	7	DNS										22
17	(Italy) Federico Fuligni	MV Agusta	Ret	Ret	13	15	14	Ret	11	18	14	Ret			13
18	(Italy) Lorenzo Gabellini	Yamaha							6						10
19	(Netherlands) Glenn van Straalen	Kawasaki	14	16	16	9	Ret	NC	20	16	16	Ret	18	15	10
20	(Republic of Ireland) Jack Kennedy	Yamaha								7					9
21	(Netherlands) Rob Hartog	Kawasaki	DNS	14	DNS	14	16	15	18	12	18	Ret	21	19	9
22	(Netherlands) Jaimie van Sikkelerus	Honda	13	13	Ret	17	17	18	Ret	14	15	18	17	Ret	9
23	(Italy) Kevin Manfredi	Yamaha							8						8
24	(United Kingdom) Brad Jones	Yamaha								9				16	7
25	(Spain) Miquel Pons	Yamaha									10				6
26	(Italy) Massimo Roccoli	Yamaha					NC		10						6
27	(Australia) Tom Toparis	Yamaha	11												5
28	(Germany) Christian Stange	Honda		Ret	18	18	DNS	16	21	17	Ret	14	13	22	5
29	(Spain) María Herrera	Yamaha	16	15	15	19	15	14	DSQ		Ret				5
30	(Italy) Gabriele Ruiu	Honda	Ret								12				4
30	(Italy) Gabriele Ruiu	Yamaha					Ret					Ret			4
31	(Italy) Luca Ottaviani	Yamaha					18		12						4
32	(Spain) Daniel Valle	Yamaha									13	16	19	20	3
33	(France) Xavier Navand	Yamaha			Ret	Ret						15			1
34	(Italy) Mattia Casadei	Yamaha							15						1
	(Netherlands) Wayne Tessels	Yamaha				16									0
	(Spain) Nacho Calero	Kawasaki	17	18	Ret	DNS	19	17	22	19	17	Ret	DNQ	21	0
	(Qatar) Saeed Al Sulaiti	Yamaha												17	0
	(France) Guillaume Pot	Yamaha										17			0
	(Italy) Filippo Fuligni	Yamaha							17						0
	(Italy) Filippo Fuligni	MV Agusta											22	DNS	0
	(Italy) Alfonso Coppola	Honda	DNS	17	19	20	Ret								0
	(Italy) Alfonso Coppola	Yamaha											20		0
	(Italy) Michael Canducci	Yamaha						19	25		19				0
	(Thailand) Ratchada Nakcharoensri	Yamaha		19											0
	(Hungary) Alen Győrfi	Yamaha						Ret	26	Ret	20				0
	(Spain) Álex Toledo	Yamaha								20					0
	(Italy) Gianluca Sconza	Honda						20	Ret	23	DSQ	DNQ	23	22	0
	(France) Gaëtan Matern	Kawasaki			Ret	DNQ	DNQ	Ret		DNQ	21	DNQ			0
	(Italy) Roberto Rolfo	Kawasaki							23						0
	(Germany) Patrick Hobelsberger	Yamaha							24						0
	(France) Maximilien Bau	Yamaha										Ret			0
	(Spain) Borja Quero	Yamaha						Ret							0
	(France) Loïc Arbel	Yamaha						Ret							0
	(Italy) Fabio Massei	Yamaha					Ret								0
	(Germany) Daniel Rubin	Yamaha				Ret									0
	(Italy) Alex Bernardi	Kawasaki							DNS						0
	(Belgium) Arne De Wintere	Yamaha				DNS									0
Pos.	Rider	Bike	PHI (Australia)	CHA (Thailand)	ARA (Spain)	ASS (Netherlands)	IMO (Italy)	JER (Spain)	MIS (Italy)	DON (United Kingdom)	POR (Portugal)	MAG (France)	VIL (Argentina)	LOS (Qatar)	Pts.

Colour	Result
Gold	Winner
Silver	Second place
Bronze	Third place
Green	Points classification
Blue	Non-points classification
Blue	Non-classified finish (NC)
Purple	Retired, not classified (Ret)
Red	Did not qualify (DNQ)
Red	Did not pre-qualify (DNPQ)
Black	Disqualified (DSQ)
White	Did not start (DNS)
White	Withdrew (WD)
White	Race cancelled (C)
Blank	Did not practice (DNP)
Blank	Did not arrive (DNA)
Blank	Excluded (EX)

**Bold** – Pole position
Italics – Fastest lap

=== Teams' championship ===
Pos.	Teams	Bike No.	PHI (Australia)	CHA (Thailand)	ARA (Spain)	ASS (Netherlands)	IMO (Italy)	JER (Spain)	MIS (Italy)	DON (United Kingdom)	POR (Portugal)	MAG (France)	VIL (Argentina)	LOS (Qatar)	Pts.
1	(Italy) BARDAHL Evan Bros. WorldSSP Team	21	1	2	1	**2**	**1**	**2**	1	4	2	Ret	7	5	420
1	(Italy) BARDAHL Evan Bros. WorldSSP Team	64	**3**	3	3	1	2	1	2	**2**	**1**	Ret	5	**4**	420
1	(Italy) BARDAHL Evan Bros. WorldSSP Team	27							15						420
2	(France) GMT94 Yamaha	16	2	**1**	5	4	7	3	4	1	4	6	1	2	291
2	(France) GMT94 Yamaha	94	7	11	6	6	DNS	9	Ret	8	6	7	**4**	6	291
2	(France) GMT94 Yamaha	9										Ret			291
3	(Italy) Kawasaki Puccetti Racing	44	12	8	7	5	8	6	**3**	3	3	1	2	1	273
3	(Italy) Kawasaki Puccetti Racing	78	6	6	8	7	4	7	5	13	7	5	12	8	273
4	(Finland) Kallio Racing	32	Ret	4	10	8	6	8	27	22	Ret	2	3	3	214
4	(Finland) Kallio Racing	36	5	Ret	**4**	3	Ret	4	9	6		8	8	12	214
4	(Finland) Kallio Racing	84	10	9	14	13	12	12	13	Ret	9	13	14	DNS	214
4	(Finland) Kallio Racing	6									Ret				214
5	(Italy) MV Agusta Reparto Corse	3	18	5	2	Ret	3	5	Ret	5	Ret	4	6	7	114
5	(Italy) MV Agusta Reparto Corse	22	Ret	Ret	13	15	14	Ret	11	18	14	Ret			114
5	(Italy) MV Agusta Reparto Corse	20											22	DNS	114
6	(United Kingdom) CIA Landlord Insurance Honda	56	8	12	11	12	10	10	16	11	11	10	11	11	98
6	(United Kingdom) CIA Landlord Insurance Honda	95	9	Ret	12	10	11	Ret	14	21	8	12	16	13	98
7	(Italy) Team Pedercini Racing	86	15	Ret	Ret	11	5	13	Ret	10	5	3	10	10	96
7	(Italy) Team Pedercini Racing	11			9	Ret	13	Ret	19	Ret	Ret	**9**	9	9	96
8	(Netherlands) MPM WILSport Racedays	38	Ret	10	17	Ret	9	11	7	15		11	15	14	49
8	(Netherlands) MPM WILSport Racedays	74	13	13	Ret	17	17	18	Ret	14	15	18	17	Ret	49
8	(Netherlands) MPM WILSport Racedays	61									12				49
9	(Hungary) Team Tóth by Willirace	80	4	7	DNS										22
9	(Hungary) Team Tóth by Willirace	2												16	22
9	(Hungary) Team Tóth by Willirace	40						Ret	26	Ret	20				22
9	(Hungary) Team Tóth by Willirace	61					Ret					Ret			22
9	(Hungary) Team Tóth by Willirace	15											20		22
10	(United Kingdom) Appleyard Macadam Integro	14								7					16
10	(United Kingdom) Appleyard Macadam Integro	2								9					16
11	(Italy) GOMMA Racing	60							6						10
12	(Netherlands) EAB Racing Team	30	14	16	16	9	Ret	NC	20	16	16	Ret	18	15	10
13	(Netherlands) Team Hartog – Against Cancer	47	DNS	14	DNS	14	16	15	18	12	18	Ret	21	19	9
14	(Italy) Team Rosso e Nero	33							8						8
14	(Italy) Team Rosso e Nero	20							17						8
15	(Spain) MS Racing	6	16	15	15	19	15	14	DSQ						8
15	(Spain) MS Racing	31									13	16	19	20	8
15	(Spain) MS Racing	66								20					8
16	(Italy) Team Rosso Corsa	55					NC		10						6
17	(Spain) H43 Team Nobby Talasur–Blumaq	71									10				6
18	(Australia) Landbridge Transport Yamaha	7	11												5
19	(Italy) GEMAR – Ciociaria Corse WorldSSP Team	4		Ret	18	18	DNS	16	21	17	Ret	14	13	22	5
19	(Italy) GEMAR – Ciociaria Corse WorldSSP Team	15	DNS	17	19	20	Ret								5
19	(Italy) GEMAR – Ciociaria Corse WorldSSP Team	53						20	Ret	23	DSQ	DNQ	23	22	5
19	(Italy) GEMAR – Ciociaria Corse WorldSSP Team	61	Ret												5
20	(Italy) SGM Tecnic	12					18		12						4
21	(Italy) Altogoo Racing Team	48										15			1
	(Netherlands) Team SWPN	77				16									0
	(Spain) Orelac Racing VerdNatura	10	17	18	Ret	DNS	19	17	22	19	17	Ret	DNQ	21	0
	(France) Team MHP Racing–Patrick Pons	69										17			0
	(Qatar) QMMF Racing Team	29												17	0
	(Thailand) YAMAHA PTT Lubricants TANN Racing	46		19											0
	(Spain) DK Motorsport	65						19	25		19				0
	(Spain) DK Motorsport	48			Ret	Ret									0
	(Spain) DK Motorsport	34					Ret								0
	(France) Flembbo Leader Team	67			Ret	DNQ	DNQ	Ret		DNQ	21	DNQ			0
	(France) Flembbo Leader Team	76							DNS						0
	(Italy) Team GREEN SPEED	13							23						0
	(Germany) Hobelsberger Racing	26							24						0
	(Germany) Rubin Racing Team	43				Ret									0
	(Spain) EMPERADOR Racing Team	39						Ret							0
	(Spain) EMPERADOR Racing Team	23						Ret							0
	(Belgium) Go4Racing	24				DNS									0
Pos.	Teams	Bike No.	PHI (Australia)	CHA (Thailand)	ARA (Spain)	ASS (Netherlands)	IMO (Italy)	JER (Spain)	MIS (Italy)	DON (United Kingdom)	POR (Portugal)	MAG (France)	VIL (Argentina)	LOS (Qatar)	Pts.

=== Manufacturers' championship ===
Pos.	Manufacturer	PHI (Australia)	CHA (Thailand)	ARA (Spain)	ASS (Netherlands)	IMO (Italy)	JER (Spain)	MIS (Italy)	DON (United Kingdom)	POR (Portugal)	MAG (France)	VIL (Argentina)	LOS (Qatar)	Pts.
1	(Japan) Yamaha	1	1	1	1	1	1	1	1	1	2	1	2	290
2	(Japan) Kawasaki	6	6	7	5	4	6	3	3	3	1	2	1	181
3	(Italy) MV Agusta	18	5	2	15	3	5	11	5	14	4	6	7	109
4	(Japan) Honda	8	10	11	10	9	10	7	11	8	10	11	11	76
Pos.	Manufacturer	PHI (Australia)	CHA (Thailand)	ARA (Spain)	ASS (Netherlands)	IMO (Italy)	JER (Spain)	MIS (Italy)	DON (United Kingdom)	POR (Portugal)	MAG (France)	VIL (Argentina)	LOS (Qatar)	Pts.
