= Loris Cresson =

Belgian motorcycle racer

- Nationality: Belgian
- Born: 14 August 1998 (age 28); Braine-l'Alleud, Belgium
- Current team: Outdo TPR Team Pedercini Racing
- Bike number: 84
Motorcycle racing career statistics
Moto3 World Championship
| Active years | 2015 |
| Manufacturers | KTM |
| Championships | 0 |
| 2015 championship position | NC (0 pts) |
Starts / Wins / Podiums / Poles / F. laps / Points; 1 / 0 / 0 / 0 / 0 / 0
Superbike World Championship
| Active years | 2020–2022 |
| Manufacturers | Kawasaki |
| Championships | 0 |
| 2022 championship position | NC (0 pts) |
Starts / Wins / Podiums / Poles / F. laps / Points; 38 / 0 / 0 / 0 / 0 / 3
Supersport World Championship
| Active years | 2016–2020 |
| Manufacturers | Kawasaki, Yamaha |
| Championships | 0 |
| 2020 championship position | 23rd (12 pts) |
Starts / Wins / Podiums / Poles / F. laps / Points; 42 / 0 / 0 / 0 / 0 / 105

Loris Cresson (born 14 August 1998) is a Belgian motorcycle racer. He has competed in a Moto3 World Championship race in 2015, when he replaced the injured Ana Carrasco, in the Supersport World Championship from 2016 to 2020 and in the Superbike World Championship in 2020 and 2021. In the 2022 FIM Endurance World Championship, he rode for team BMRT 3D Maxxess Devers in the Superstock class.

== Career statistics ==
=== FIM CEV Moto3 Junior World Championship ===
==== Races by year ====
(key) (Races in bold indicate pole position, races in italics indicate fastest lap)

| Year | Bike | 1 | 2 | 3 | 4 | 5 | 6 | 7 | 8 | 9 | 10 | 11 | 12 | Pos | Pts |
|---|---|---|---|---|---|---|---|---|---|---|---|---|---|---|---|
| 2014 | FTR Honda | JER1; Ret | JER2; 29 | LMS; 17 | ARA; 13 | CAT1; 9 | CAT2; 11 | ALB; 12 | NAV; 22 | ALG | VAL1 | VAL2 | | 18th | 23 |
| 2014 | KTM | JER1 | JER2 | LMS | ARA | CAT1 | CAT2 | ALB | NAV | ALG | VAL1; 14 | VAL2; 14 | | 18th | 23 |
| 2015 | KTM | ALG; 16 | LMS; 19 | CAT1; Ret | CAT2; 26 | ARA1 | ARA2 | ALB; 19 | NAV; 21 | JER1 | JER2 | VAL1 | VAL2 | NC | 0 |

=== Grand Prix motorcycle racing ===
==== By season ====
| Season | Class | Motorcycle | Team | Race | Win | Podium | Pole | FLap | Pts | Plcd |
|---|---|---|---|---|---|---|---|---|---|---|
| 2015 | Moto3 | KTM | RBA Racing Team | 1 | 0 | 0 | 0 | 0 | 0 | NC |
| Total | | | | **1** | **0** | **0** | **0** | **0** | **0** | |

==== Races by year ====
(key) (Races in bold indicate pole position; races in italics indicate fastest lap)

| Year | Class | Bike | 1 | 2 | 3 | 4 | 5 | 6 | 7 | 8 | 9 | 10 | 11 | 12 | 13 | 14 | 15 | 16 | 17 | 18 | Pos | Pts |
|---|---|---|---|---|---|---|---|---|---|---|---|---|---|---|---|---|---|---|---|---|---|---|
| 2015 | Moto3 | KTM | QAT; 29 | AME | ARG | SPA | FRA | ITA | CAT | NED | GER | IND | CZE | GBR | RSM | ARA | JPN | AUS | MAL | VAL | NC | 0 |

=== Supersport World Championship ===
==== Races by year ====
(key) (Races in bold indicate pole position; races in italics indicate fastest lap)

| Year | Bike | 1 | 2 | 3 | 4 | 5 | 6 | 7 | 8 | 9 | 10 | 11 | 12 | 13 | 14 | 15 | Pos | Pts |
|---|---|---|---|---|---|---|---|---|---|---|---|---|---|---|---|---|---|---|
| 2016 | Kawasaki | AUS | THA | SPA; 18 | NED; 27 | ITA; 27 | MAL | GBR | ITA | GER | FRA | SPA | | | | | 32nd | 4 |
| 2016 | Yamaha | | | | | | | | | | | | QAT; 12 | | | | 32nd | 4 |
| 2017 | Yamaha | AUS | THA | SPA; Ret | NED | ITA; 8 | GBR | ITA; Ret | GER | POR | FRA | SPA | QAT | | | | 30th | 8 |
| 2018 | Yamaha | AUS; 12 | THA; 13 | SPA; 12 | NED; 10 | ITA; 13 | GBR; 12 | CZE; 10 | ITA; Ret | POR; DNS | FRA; 18 | ARG; 10 | QAT; 12 | | | | 12th | 40 |
| 2019 | Yamaha | AUS; 10 | THA; 9 | SPA; 14 | NED; 13 | ITA; 12 | SPA; 12 | ITA; 13 | GBR; Ret | POR; 9 | FRA; 13 | ARG; 14 | QAT; DNS | | | | 12th | 41 |
| 2020 | Yamaha | AUS; 15 | SPA; 14 | SPA; 18 | POR; 15 | POR; 14 | SPA; 19 | SPA; 17 | SPA; 16 | SPA; 16 | SPA; 11 | SPA; 15 | FRA; 17 | FRA; Ret | POR | POR | 23rd | 12 |

=== Superbike World Championship ===
==== Races by year ====
(key) (Races in bold indicate pole position, races in italics indicate fastest lap)

| Year | Bike | 1 | | | 2 | | | 3 | | | 4 | | | 5 | | | 6 | | | 7 | | | 8 | | | 9 | | | 10 | | | 11 | | | 12 | | | 13 | | | Pos | Pts |
| Year | Bike | R1 | SR | R2 | R1 | SR | R2 | R1 | SR | R2 | R1 | SR | R2 | R1 | SR | R2 | R1 | SR | R2 | R1 | SR | R2 | R1 | SR | R2 | R1 | SR | R2 | R1 | SR | R2 | R1 | SR | R2 | R1 | SR | R2 | R1 | SR | R2 | Pos | Pts |
|---|---|---|---|---|---|---|---|---|---|---|---|---|---|---|---|---|---|---|---|---|---|---|---|---|---|---|---|---|---|---|---|---|---|---|---|---|---|---|---|---|---|---|
| 2020 | Kawasaki | AUS | AUS | AUS | SPA | SPA | SPA | POR | POR | POR | SPA | SPA | SPA | SPA | SPA | SPA | SPA | SPA | SPA | FRA | FRA | FRA | POR; 18 | POR; 20 | POR; 19 | | | | | | | | | | | | | | | | NC | 0 |
| 2021 | Kawasaki | SPA; 18 | SPA; 20 | SPA; 20 | POR; 20 | POR; 19 | POR; 18 | ITA; 20 | ITA; 18 | ITA; 20 | GBR; 16 | GBR; Ret | GBR; 19 | NED; 13 | NED; 17 | NED; 17 | CZE; Ret | CZE; 19 | CZE; 20 | SPA; 17 | SPA; 20 | SPA; 17 | FRA; 18 | FRA; 20 | FRA; 18 | SPA; 18 | SPA; 14 | SPA; Ret | SPA; 17 | SPA; C | SPA; Ret | POR; 16 | POR; Ret | POR; Ret | ARG | ARG | ARG | INA | INA | INA | 25th | 3 |
| 2022 | Kawasaki | SPA; 23 | SPA; 24 | SPA; 23 | NED | NED | NED | POR | POR | POR | ITA | ITA | ITA | GBR | GBR | GBR | CZE | CZE | CZE | FRA | FRA | FRA | SPA | SPA | SPA | POR | POR | POR | ARG | ARG | ARG | INA | INA | INA | AUS | AUS | AUS | | | | NC | 0 |

=== FIM Endurance World Championship ===
| Year | Team | Bike | Tyre | Rider | Pts | TC |
|---|---|---|---|---|---|---|
| 2025 | (France) Maxxess By BMRT 3D | Kawasaki ZX-10R | **P** | (Spain) Isaac Viñales (Spain) Mathieu Gines (Belgium) Loris Cresson | 40* | 7th* |

=== Suzuka 8 Hours ===
| Year | Class | Team | Co-riders | Bike | Pos |
|---|---|---|---|---|---|
| 2026 | **SST** | (Belgium) Champion-Hert Powered by MRP | (Hungary) Bálint Kovács (Germany) Jan Bühn | BMW M1000RR | 4 |
