= Hikari Okubo =

Japanese motorcycle racer

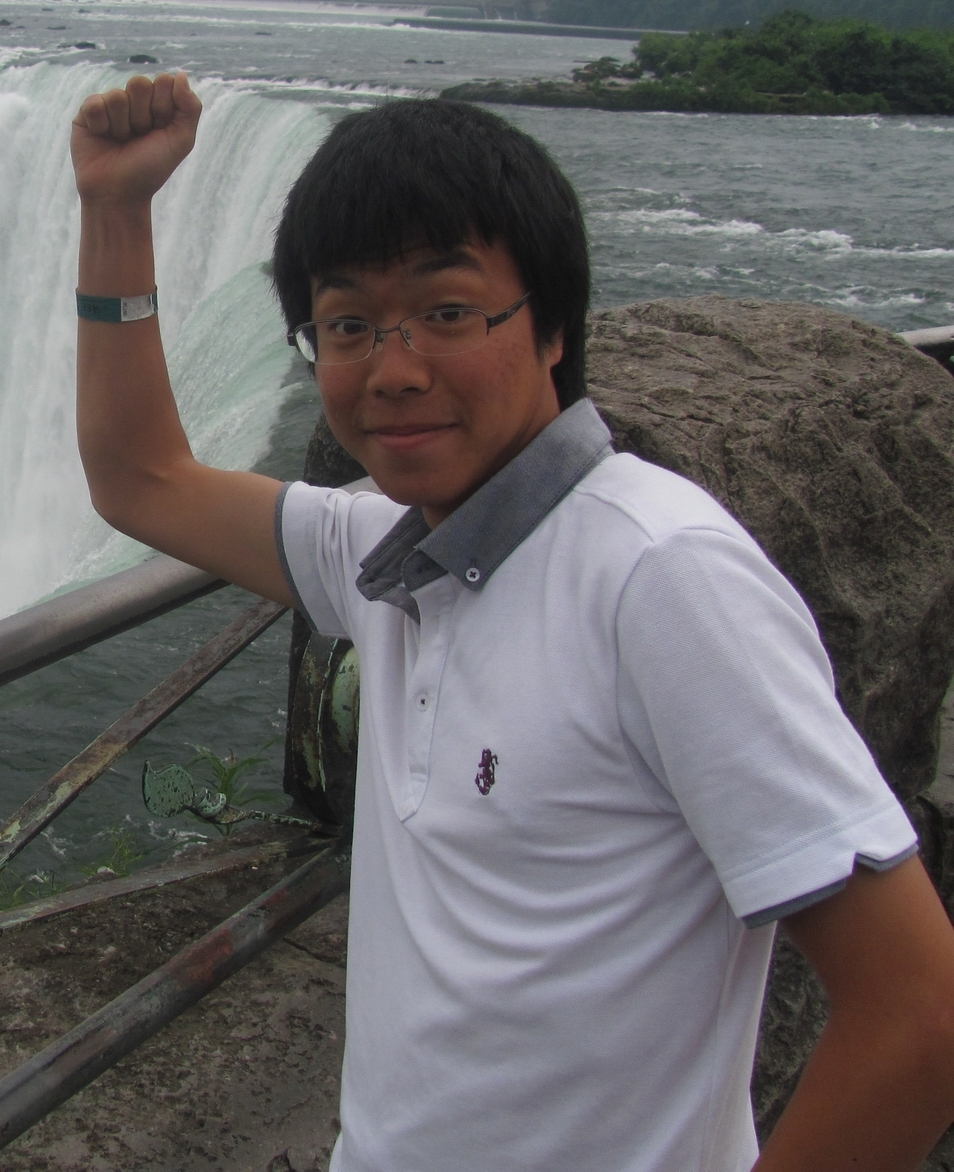
- Okubo in 2013
- Nationality: Japanese
- Born: 11 August 1993 (age 33); Kodaira, Tokyo, Japan
- Current team: Tech3 E-Racing
- Bike number: 78
Motorcycle racing career statistics
Moto3 World Championship
Active years	2014
Manufacturers	Honda
Championships	0
2014 championship position	NC (0 pts)
Starts / Wins / Podiums / Poles / F. laps / Points; 1 / 0 / 0 / 0 / 0 / 0
125cc World Championship
Active years	2010–2011
Manufacturers	Honda
Championships	0
2011 championship position	NC (0 pts)
Starts / Wins / Podiums / Poles / F. laps / Points; 2 / 0 / 0 / 0 / 0 / 0
MotoE World Championship
Active years	2021-
Manufacturers	Energica, Ducati
2023 championship position	13th (79 pts)
Starts / Wins / Podiums / Poles / F. laps / Points; 35 / 0 / 1 / 0 / 0 / 219.5
Supersport World Championship
Active years	2016–2020,2024
Manufacturers	Honda, Kawasaki
Championships	0
2024 championship position	44th (0 pts)
Starts / Wins / Podiums / Poles / F. laps / Points; 63 / 0 / 0 / 0 / 0 / 217

Hikari Okubo (大久保光, Ōkubo Hikari; born 11 August 1993) is a Japanese motorcycle racer who last competed in the MotoE World Championship for Tech3 E-Racing. He has also competed in the Supersport World Championship aboard a Honda CBR600RR.

== Career ==
=== All Japan Road Race GP125/GP3 Championship ===
Born in the city of Kodaira in Tokyo, Okubo started in the All Japan Road Race Championship GP125 class in 2008, riding for Endurance Honda, where he finished the season in 20th place overall with a best result of 13th at Tsukuba. For 2009, Okubo remained in the GP125 class but joined the 18 Garage Racing Team once again on a Honda. 2009 saw a significant improvement from 2008, with sixth overall in the championship; his best result in 2009 was sixth position at Okayama. Okubo once again rode with the 18 Garage Racing Team aboard a Honda in 2010, staying in the newly renamed J-GP3 class. Okubo opened the season with his first victory in the Japanese championship at Tsukuba, this was followed by another victory at Motegi, these victories along with two other podiums were enough to secure his first Japanese championship title. Okubo also competed in his first 125cc World Championship event as a wildcard at the Japanese round at Motegi, he qualified in 26th and finished the race just out of the points in 16th position. Deciding to try to defend his title in 2011, Okubo stayed in the J-GP3 class, along with 18 Garage Racing Team for the third consecutive year. Okubo only finished two of the five races, as he could only finish tenth overall. He once again received a wildcard entry to the 125cc World Championship for the Japanese round held at Motegi, he qualified 25th and finished just outside the points again in 17th.

=== Asia Dream Cup ===
Deciding not to remain in the Japanese championship in 2012, Okubo joined the one-make Asia Dream Cup aboard a Honda CBR250 for the inaugural season. The Asia Dream Cup, which runs alongside the Asia Road Racing Championship, spanned across six different countries in Asia. Okubo was engaged in an all out battle with fellow Japanese rider Hiroki Ono, which Okubo prevailed in by ten points ahead of Ono.

=== Return to All Japan Road Race GP3 ===
For 2013, Okubo returned to the Japanese championship to try and recapture the J-GP3 title with the Hot Racing Honda squad, he eventually finished third overall with five third-place finishes his best results. He remained in the J-GP3 class with Hot Racing aboard a Honda NSF250R in 2014, he finished the season in sixth overall, with a second-place finish at Motegi being his best result. He also received a wildcard for the Motegi round of the 2014 Moto3 World Championship, he failed to finish the race after qualifying 26th.

=== All Japan Road Race ST600 Championship ===
In 2015, Okuba\o made a class change as he stepped up to the ST600 series with Kohara Racing riding a stock Honda CBR600RR, he finished the season third overall after two podium finishes in the final rounds of the season at Okayama and Suzuka.

=== Supersport World Championship ===
In November 2015, it was announced that Okubo had signed to race for CIA Landlord Insurance Honda in the 2016 Supersport World Championship season, riding a Honda CBR600RR. He finished his rookie season 21st overall, scoring points in six of the twelve races. His best finish result was tenth place at EuroSpeedway Lausitz. He remained in the class for the 2017 season, riding a Honda CBR600RR. He improved his final championship position to 15th overall, highlighted by a sixth place at Buriram International Circuit. In 2018, he switched to the Puccetti Racing squad, riding a Kawasaki ZX-6R. Okubo finished in 13th place in the championship, with eighth place at Circuito San Juan Villicum his best result. Okubo remained with Kawasaki Puccetti Racing in 2019.

=== MotoE World Cup ===
On February 2, 2021, it was announced that Okubo would compete in the 2021 MotoE World Cup as part of Avant Ajo MotoE, replacing Niki Tuuli.

== Career statistics ==
=== Grand Prix motorcycle racing ===
==== By season ====
Season	Class	Motorcycle	Team	Race	Win	Podium	Pole	FLap	Pts	Plcd
2010	125cc	Honda	18 Garage Racing Team	1	0	0	0	0	0	NC
2011	125cc	Honda	18 Garage Racing Team	1	0	0	0	0	0	NC
2014	Moto3	Honda	Hot Racing with I-Factory	1	0	0	0	0	0	NC
2021	MotoE	Energica	Avant Ajo MotoE	7	0	0	0	0	45	11th
2022	MotoE	Energica Ego Corsa	Avant Ajo MotoE	12	0	1	0	0	95.5	6th
2023	MotoE	Ducati V21L	Tech3 E-Racing	16	0	0	0	0	79	13th
Total				**38**	**0**	**1**	**0**	**0**	**219.5**	

==== By class ====
Class	Seasons	1st GP	1st Pod	1st Win	Race	Win	Podiums	Pole	FLap	Pts	WChmp
125cc	2010–2011	2010 Japan			2	0	0	0	0	0	0
Moto3	2014	2014 Japan			1	0	0	0	0	0	0
MotoE	2021–present	2021 Spain	2022 France		35	0	1	0	0	219.5	0
Total	2010–2011, 2014, 2021–present				**38**	**0**	**1**	**0**	**0**	**219.5**	**0**

==== Races by year ====
(key) (Races in bold indicate pole position; races in italics indicate fastest lap)

Year	Class	Bike	1	2	3	4	5	6	7	8	9	10	11	12	13	14	15	16	17	18	Pos	Pts
2010	125cc	Honda	QAT	SPA	FRA	ITA	GBR	NED	CAT	GER	CZE	INP	RSM	ARA	JPN; 16	MAL	AUS	POR	VAL		NC	0
2011	125cc	Honda	QAT	SPA	POR	FRA	CAT	GBR	NED	ITA	GER	CZE	INP	RSM	ARA	JPN; 17	AUS	MAL	VAL		NC	0
2014	Moto3	Honda	QAT	AME	ARG	SPA	FRA	ITA	CAT	NED	GER	INP	CZE	GBR	RSM	ARA	JPN; Ret	AUS	MAL	VAL	NC	0
2021	MotoE	Energica	SPA; 7	FRA; Ret	CAT; 9	NED; 8	AUT; 5	RSM1; Ret	RSM2; 6												11th	45
2022	MotoE	Energica	SPA1; 6	SPA2; 5	FRA1; 3	FRA2; 6	ITA1; 11	ITA2; Ret	NED1; 13	NED2; 11^{‡}	AUT1; 4	AUT2; 7	RSM1; 7	RSM2; 9							6th	95.5
2023	MotoE	Ducati	FRA1; 5	FRA2; 10	ITA1; 15	ITA2; 12	GER1; 10	GER2; 8	NED1; 14	NED2; 12	GBR1; 13	GBR2; 8	AUT1; Ret	AUT2; 8	CAT1; 13	CAT2; 13	RSM1; 9	RSM2; 12			13th	79

^{‡} Half points awarded as less than two thirds of the race distance (but at least three full laps) was completed.

=== Supersport World Championship ===
==== Races by year ====
(key) (Races in bold indicate pole position; races in italics indicate fastest lap)

Year	Bike	1	2	3	4	5	6	7	8	9	10	11	12	Pos	Pts
2016	Honda	AUS; Ret	THA; 20	SPA; 16	NED; 24	ITA; 19	MAL; 15	GBR; 15	ITA; 11	GER; 10	FRA; 27	SPA; 13	QAT; 13	21st	19
2017	Honda	AUS; DNS	THA; 6	SPA; 11	NED; 21	ITA; 9	GBR; 9	ITA; 15	GER; 23	POR; 12	FRA; 11	SPA; 13	QAT; Ret	15th	42
2018	Kawasaki	AUS; 14	THA; 19	SPA; Ret	NED; Ret	ITA; 10	GBR; Ret	CZE; 13	ITA; 9	POR; 10	FRA; 9	ARG; 8	QAT; Ret	13th	39
2019	Kawasaki	AUS; 6	THA; 6	SPA; 8	NED; 7	ITA; 4	SPA; 7	ITA; 5	GBR; 13	POR; 7	FRA; 5	ARG; 12	QAT; 8	5th	105

Year	Bike	1		2		3		4		5		6		7		8		9		10		11		12		Pos	Pts
Year	Bike	R1	R2	R1	R2	R1	R2	R1	R2	R1	R2	R1	R2	R1	R2	R1	R2	R1	R2	R1	R2	R1	R2	R1	R2	Pos	Pts
2020	Honda	AUS; Ret		SPA; Ret	SPA; Ret	POR	POR	SPA; 17	SPA; 15	SPA; Ret	SPA; DNS	SPA	SPA	FRA; Ret	FRA; 9	POR; 12	POR; Ret									22nd	12
2021	Kawasaki	SPA	SPA	POR	POR	ITA	ITA	NED	NED	CZE	CZE	SPA; 12	SPA; Ret	FRA; DNS	FRA; DNS	SPA	SPA	SPA	SPA	POR	POR	ARG	ARG	INA	INA	40th	4
2024	Kawasaki	AUS; Ret	AUS; 24	SPA; 24	SPA; 23	NED; 25	NED; 17	ITA	ITA	GBR	GBR	CZE	CZE	POR	POR	FRA	FRA	ITA	ITA	SPA	SPA	POR	POR	SPA	SPA	44th	0

=== CIV National 600 ===
==== Races by year ====
(key) (Races in bold indicate pole position; races in italics indicate fastest lap)

Year	Bike	1		2		3		4		5		6		Pos	Pts
Year	Bike	R1	R2	R1	R2	R1	R2	R1	R2	R1	R2	R1	R2	Pos	Pts
2022	Kawasaki	MIS	MIS	VAL	VAL	MUG	MUG	MIS2	MIS2	MUG2; 6	MUG2; C	IMO; 10	IMO; 8	18th	24

=== Asia Production 250 ===
==== Races by year ====
(key) (Races in bold indicate pole position, races in italics indicate fastest lap)

Year	Bike	1		2		3		4		5		6		Pos	Pts
Year	Bike	R1	R2	R1	R2	R1	R2	R1	R2	R1	R2	R1	R2	Pos	Pts
2025	Honda	CHA	CHA	SEP	SEP	MOT; 7	MOT; 8	MAN	MAN	SEP	SEP	CHA	CHA	20th	17

=== ARRC Supersports 600 Championship ===
==== Races by year ====
(key) (Races in bold indicate pole position; races in italics indicate fastest lap)

Year	Bike	1		2		3		4		5		6		Pos	Pts
Year	Bike	R1	R2	R1	R2	R1	R2	R1	R2	R1	R2	R1	R2	Pos	Pts
2026	Honda	SEP	SEP	CHA	CHA	MOT; 1	MOT; 1	MAN	MAN	SEP	SEP	CHA	CHA	8th*	50*

=== FIM Endurance World Cup ===
Year	Team	Bike	Tyre	Rider	Pts	TC
2025	(Japan) Team Étoile	BMW S1000RR	**D**	(Japan) Hikari Okubo (Japan) Kazuki Watanabe (Japan) Motoharu Ito (Japan) Kyosuke Okuda	86	5th

=== Suzuka 8 Hours ===
Year	Class	Team	Co-riders	Bike	Pos	Class
2025	**SST**	(Japan) Team Étoile	(Japan) Kazuki Watanabe (Japan) Motoharu Ito	BMW M1000RR	16th	1st
2026	**SST**	(Japan) Team Étoile	(Japan) Motoharu Ito (Japan) Kaito Toba	BMW M1000RR	15th	2nd
