= Andrea Locatelli (motorcyclist) =

Italian motorcycle racer

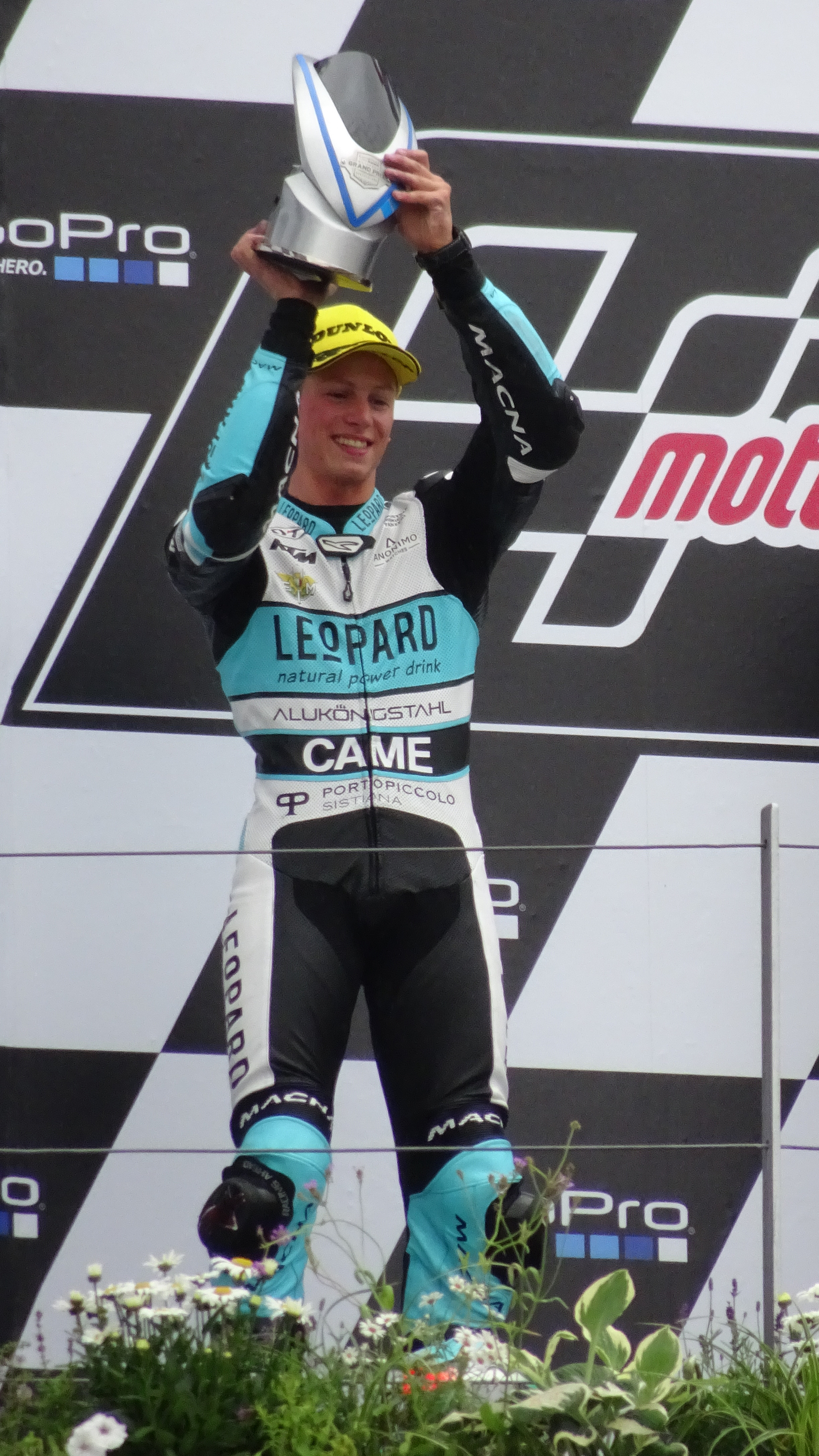
- Nationality: Italian
- Born: 16 October 1996 (age 30); Alzano Lombardo, Italy
- Current team: PATA Maxus Yamaha
- Bike number: 55
Motorcycle racing career statistics
Moto2 World Championship
Active years	2017–2019
Manufacturers	Kalex
Championships	0
2019 championship position	18th (46 pts)
Starts / Wins / Podiums / Poles / F. laps / Points; 55 / 0 / 0 / 0 / 0 / 106
Moto3 World Championship
Active years	2013–2016
Manufacturers	Mahindra, Honda, KTM
Championships	0
2016 championship position	9th (96 pts)
Starts / Wins / Podiums / Poles / F. laps / Points; 50 / 0 / 2 / 0 / 2 / 129
Superbike World Championship
Active years	2021–
Manufacturers	Yamaha
Championships	0
2025 championship position	4th (310 pts)
Starts / Wins / Podiums / Poles / F. laps / Points; 187 / 1 / 21 / 0 / 1 / 1457
Supersport World Championship
Active years	2020
Manufacturers	Yamaha
Championships	1 (2020)
2020 championship position	1st (333 pts)
Starts / Wins / Podiums / Poles / F. laps / Points; 15 / 12 / 13 / 7 / 11 / 333

Andrea Locatelli (born 16 October 1996 in Alzano Lombardo) is an Italian motorcycle racer competing in the Superbike World Championship for Yamaha. He was the 2020 Supersport world champion.

== Career ==
=== Early career ===
In 2012, Locatelli was the winner of the 2012 Italian Honda NSF250R Trophy, and in 2013, he was the 2013 CIV Moto3 Champion.

=== Moto3 World Championship ===
For the 2013 Moto3 World Championship, Locatelli was given two wild-card appearances, for the races in Italy and San Marino. He did not score any points, however, finishing in 22nd and 25th.

==== San Carlo Team Italia (2014) ====
For the 2014 season, Locatelli was given a full-time ride in Mahindra's San Carlo Team Italia, partnered by Matteo Ferrari. Locatelli did not score a single point during the entire season; Ferrari earned 12.

==== Gresini Racing Team Moto3 (2015) ====
For the 2015 season, Locatelli was given a full time ride by Gresini Racing, partnered by Enea Bastianini. Locatelli earned his first points that season, finishing with 33, and a best place finish of seventh.

==== Leopard Racing (2016) ====
For the 2016 season, Locatelli switched to Leopard Racing, partnering Joan Mir. Locatelli had his best season, finishing ninth in the standings with 96 points, and also had two second place podiums in Germany and in Australia. Mir finished the championship in fifth position as rookie of the year, scoring 144 points.

=== Moto2 World Championship ===
==== Italtrans Racing Team (2017–2019) ====
For the 2017 season, Locatelli moved up to Moto2, riding for Kalex's Italtrans team. He was partnered by Mattia Pasini, who finished with one win and two other podiums, while Locatelli finished in the points just three times, scoring eight points total for the season. This marked the fourth straight season where Locatelli's teammate finished ahead of him in the championship standings.

In the 2018 season, Locatelli and Mattia Pasini both stayed with the Italtrans team. Once again, Pasini won a race and finished with 141 points, while Locatelli struggled, finishing with 52 points and a season best of an eighth place, in his home race of Italy.

In his final Moto2 season of 2019, Locatelli was teamed up with Enea Bastianini at Italtrans. Bastianini scored a podium and 97 points, and following Locatelli's finishing with 46, he was not renewed by the team.

=== Supersport World Championship ===
For the 2020 season, Locatelli received an offer from Yamaha Motor Company in the Supersport class. Riding the Yamaha YZF-R6, Locatelli dominated in his rookie season, winning the first nine races of the year, winning 12 out of 15 races total, finishing on the podium 13 times, and having just one DNF. He beat second place Lucas Mahias by 104 points in the overall standings.

=== Superbike World Championship ===
In 2021, Locatelli moved up to the Superbike World Championship, riding for Yamaha, next to Toprak Razgatlioglu. Locatelli scored four podiums, all four being third place finishes during the season.

== Career statistics ==
=== Grand Prix motorcycle racing ===
==== By season ====
Season	Class	Motorcycle	Team	Race	Win	Podium	Pole	FLap	Pts	Plcd
2013	Moto3	Mahindra	Mahindra Racing	2	0	0	0	0	0	NC
2014	Moto3	Mahindra	San Carlo Team Italia	16	0	0	0	0	0	NC
2015	Moto3	Honda	Gresini Racing Team Moto3	14	0	0	0	0	33	20th
2016	Moto3	KTM	Leopard Racing	18	0	2	0	2	96	9th
2017	Moto2	Kalex	Italtrans Racing Team	18	0	0	0	0	8	28th
2018	Moto2	Kalex	Italtrans Racing Team	18	0	0	0	0	52	15th
2019	Moto2	Kalex	Italtrans Racing Team	19	0	0	0	0	46	18th
Total				**105**	**0**	**2**	**0**	**2**	**235**	

==== By class ====
Class	Seasons	1st GP	1st pod	1st win	Race	Win	Podiums	Pole	FLap	Pts	WChmp
Moto3	2013–2016	2013 Italy	2016 Germany		50	0	2	0	2	129	0
Moto2	2017–2019	2017 Qatar			55	0	0	0	0	106	0
Total	2013–2019				**105**	**0**	**2**	**0**	**2**	**235**	**0**

==== Races by year ====
(key) (Races in bold indicate pole position; races in italics indicate fastest lap)

Year	Class	Bike	1	2	3	4	5	6	7	8	9	10	11	12	13	14	15	16	17	18	19	Pos	Pts
2013	Moto3	Mahindra	QAT	AME	SPA	FRA	ITA; 22	CAT	NED	GER	INP	CZE	GBR	RSM; 25	ARA	MAL	AUS	JPN	VAL			NC	0
2014	Moto3	Mahindra	QAT; 23	AME; 25	ARG; Ret	SPA	FRA	ITA; 18	CAT; 29	NED; 17	GER; Ret	INP; 25	CZE; 25	GBR; 19	RSM; Ret	ARA; 18	JPN; 23	AUS; Ret	MAL; Ret	VAL; 26		NC	0
2015	Moto3	Honda	QAT; 11	AME; 7	ARG; 23	SPA; 16	FRA; 16	ITA; 13	CAT; 12	NED; Ret	GER; 9	INP; 13	CZE; Ret	GBR; Ret	RSM; DNS	ARA; DNS	JPN; 14	AUS; Ret	MAL; DNS	VAL		20th	33
2016	Moto3	KTM	QAT; 21	ARG; 4	AME; 5	SPA; Ret	FRA; 10	ITA; Ret	CAT; 19	NED; Ret	GER; 2	AUT; 13	CZE; Ret	GBR; 14	RSM; 6	ARA; 17	JPN; Ret	AUS; 2	MAL; 5	VAL; 20		9th	96
2017	Moto2	Kalex	QAT; 27	ARG; Ret	AME; 20	SPA; 26	FRA; 19	ITA; 16	CAT; 14	NED; 18	GER; Ret	CZE; 13	AUT; Ret	GBR; 23	RSM; Ret	ARA; 19	JPN; Ret	AUS; Ret	MAL; 13	VAL; 16		28th	8
2018	Moto2	Kalex	QAT; 19	ARG; 15	AME; 14	SPA; 15	FRA; 12	ITA; 8	CAT; 11	NED; 10	GER; Ret	CZE; 14	AUT; 13	GBR; C	RSM; 14	ARA; 16	THA; 9	JPN; 16	AUS; 20	MAL; 12	VAL; 9	15th	52
2019	Moto2	Kalex	QAT; 13	ARG; 11	AME; 10	SPA; 14	FRA; Ret	ITA; 18	CAT; 12	NED; 6	GER; 15	CZE; 14	AUT; 11	GBR; 15	RSM; 13	ARA; 17	THA; 13	JPN; 15	AUS; 18	MAL; 16	VAL; 20	18th	46

=== Supersport World Championship ===
==== Races by year ====
(key) (Races in bold indicate pole position; races in italics indicate fastest lap)

Year	Bike	1	2	3	4	5	6	7	8	9	10	11	12	13	14	15	Pos	Pts
2020	Yamaha	**AUS**; 1	**SPA**; 1	**SPA**; 1	**POR**; 1	**POR**; 1	**SPA**; 1	**SPA**; 1	**SPA**; 1	**SPA**; 1	**SPA**; 4	**SPA**; 1	FRA; 1	FRA; Ret	**POR**; 1	**POR**; 2	1st	333

=== Superbike World Championship ===
==== By season ====
Season	Motorcycle	Team	Race	Win	Podium	Pole	FLap	Pts	Plcd
2021	Yamaha YZF-R1	Pata Yamaha with Brixx WorldSBK	37	0	4	0	0	291	4th
2022	Yamaha YZF-R1	Pata Yamaha with Brixx WorldSBK	36	0	1	0	0	273	5th
2023	Yamaha YZF-R1	Pata Yamaha Prometeon WorldSBK	36	0	8	0	0	326	4th
2024	Yamaha YZF-R1	Pata Yamaha Prometeon WorldSBK	36	0	4	0	1	232	7th
2025	Yamaha YZF-R1	Pata Maxus Yamaha WorldSBK	36	1	4	0	0	310	4th
2026	Yamaha YZF-R1	PATA Maxus Yamaha	6	0	0	0	0	25*	11th*
Total			**187**	**1**	**21**	**0**	**1**	**1457**	

==== Races by year ====
(key) (Races in bold indicate pole position; races in italics indicate fastest lap)

Year	Bike	1			2			3			4			5			6			7			8			9			10			11			12			13			Pos	Pts
Year	Bike	R1	SR	R2	R1	SR	R2	R1	SR	R2	R1	SR	R2	R1	SR	R2	R1	SR	R2	R1	SR	R2	R1	SR	R2	R1	SR	R2	R1	SR	R2	R1	SR	R2	R1	SR	R2	R1	SR	R2	Pos	Pts
2021	Yamaha	SPA; 10	SPA; 12	SPA; 9	POR; 10	POR; 11	POR; 5	ITA; 9	ITA; 9	ITA; 9	GBR; Ret	GBR; 9	GBR; 11	NED; 5	NED; 4	NED; 3	CZE; 3	CZE; 4	CZE; 4	SPA; 4	SPA; 4	SPA; 4	FRA; 3	FRA; 4	FRA; 4	SPA; 12	SPA; Ret	SPA; 5	SPA; 4	SPA; C	SPA; 4	POR; Ret	POR; 4	POR; 3	ARG; 8	ARG; 6	ARG; 7	INA; 4	INA; C	INA; 8	4th	291
2022	Yamaha	SPA; 5	SPA; 5	SPA; 19	NED; 4	NED; 4	NED; 2	POR; 4	POR; 5	POR; 5	ITA; 6	ITA; 6	ITA; 6	GBR; 10	GBR; 8	GBR; 8	CZE; 6	CZE; 6	CZE; 6	FRA; 7	FRA; 10	FRA; 7	SPA; 9	SPA; 21	SPA; 16	POR; 6	POR; 7	POR; 6	ARG; 8	ARG; 10	ARG; 8	INA; 4	INA; 4	INA; 4	AUS; 4	AUS; 5	AUS; 5				5th	273
2023	Yamaha	AUS; 4	AUS; 5	AUS; 3	INA; 3	INA; 2	INA; 5	NED; 4	NED; 5	NED; 3	SPA; 4	SPA; 3	SPA; 7	ITA; 12	ITA; 7	ITA; 6	GBR; 5	GBR; 4	GBR; 8	ITA; 4	ITA; 3	ITA; 4	CZE; 6	CZE; Ret	CZE; 7	FRA; 6	FRA; 4	FRA; 4	SPA; 4	SPA; 4	SPA; Ret	POR; 9	POR; 3	POR; 5	SPA; 3	SPA; 6	SPA; 10				4th	326
2024	Yamaha	AUS; 2	AUS; 2	AUS; Ret	SPA; 5	SPA; 8	SPA; 13	NED; 12	NED; 6	NED; 5	ITA; 4	ITA; 4	ITA; 5	GBR; 6	GBR; 7	GBR; 7	CZE; 7	CZE; 6	CZE; 3	POR; 11	POR; 13	POR; 11	FRA; 8	FRA; Ret	FRA; 9	ITA; 12	ITA; 7	ITA; 9	SPA; 10	SPA; 11	SPA; 9	POR; Ret	POR; 4	POR; Ret	SPA; 3	SPA; 5	SPA; 8				7th	232
2025	Yamaha	AUS; 7	AUS; 6	AUS; 7	POR; 3	POR; 5	POR; 4	NED; 2	NED; 4	NED; 1	ITA; 18	ITA; 7	ITA; 8	CZE; Ret	CZE; 9	CZE; 9	EMI; 5	EMI; 3	EMI; 4	GBR; 4	GBR; 5	GBR; 4	HUN; 4	HUN; 4	HUN; 5	FRA; 5	FRA; 12	FRA; 9	ARA; 7	ARA; 12	ARA; 7	POR; 4	POR; 4	POR; 5	SPA; 7	SPA; 6	SPA; 4				4th	310
2026	Yamaha	AUS; 13	AUS; 14	AUS; 5	POR; 12	POR; 11	POR; 9	NED	NED	NED	HUN	HUN	HUN	CZE	CZE	CZE	ARA	ARA	ARA	EMI	EMI	EMI	GBR	GBR	GBR	FRA	FRA	FRA	ITA	ITA	ITA	POR	POR	POR	SPA	SPA	SPA				11th*	25*

* Season still in progress.

=== Suzuka 8 Hours ===
Year	Class	Team	Co-riders	Bike	Pos
2025	**EWC**	(Japan) Yamaha Racing Team	(Japan) Katsuyuki Nakasuga (Australia) Jack Miller	Yamaha YZF-R1	2nd
2026	**EWC**	(Japan) Yamaha Racing Team	(Japan) Katsuyuki Nakasuga (Australia) Jack Miller	Yamaha YZF-R1	TBD
