= 2015 Qatar motorcycle Grand Prix =

2015 Qatar Grand Prix
Race details
- Race 1 of 18 races in the 2015 Grand Prix motorcycle racing season
- Date: 29 March 2015
- Official name: Commercial Bank Grand Prix of Qatar
- Location: Losail International Circuit
- Course: Permanent racing facility; 5.380 km (3.343 mi)

MotoGP
Pole position
Rider	(Italy) Andrea Dovizioso	Ducati
Time	1:54.113	
Fastest lap
Rider	(Italy) Valentino Rossi	Yamaha
Time	1:55.267 on lap 5	
Podium
First	(Italy) Valentino Rossi	Yamaha
Second	(Italy) Andrea Dovizioso	Ducati
Third	(Italy) Andrea Iannone	Ducati

Moto2
Pole position
Rider	(United Kingdom) Sam Lowes	Speed Up
Time	1:59.423	
Fastest lap
Rider	(France) Johann Zarco	Kalex
Time	1:59.918 on lap 2	
Podium
First	(Germany) Jonas Folger	Kalex
Second	(Belgium) Xavier Siméon	Kalex
Third	(Switzerland) Thomas Lüthi	Kalex

Moto3
Pole position
Rider	(France) Alexis Masbou	Honda
Time	2:06.170	
Fastest lap
Rider	(Italy) Enea Bastianini	Honda
Time	2:06.561 on lap 3	
Podium
First	(France) Alexis Masbou	Honda
Second	(Italy) Enea Bastianini	Honda
Third	(United Kingdom) Danny Kent	Honda

The 2015 Qatar motorcycle Grand Prix was the first round of the 2015 Grand Prix motorcycle racing season. It was held at the Losail International Circuit in Lusail, Qatar on 29 March 2015.

In the MotoGP class, Ducati's Andrea Dovizioso took the first pole position of the season. It was an eventful race in which the lead was contested between the Movistar Yamaha and Ducati teams. For the first time since the 2006 Japanese Grand Prix, the podium was swept by Italian riders, as Yamaha's Valentino Rossi – in his 20th Grand Prix season – took his first season-opening victory since 2010, ahead of Dovizioso, and his teammate Andrea Iannone, who achieved his first MotoGP podium in third place. Reigning world champion Marc Márquez had a good start position, third on the grid, but went off track and almost hit Jorge Lorenzo and Bradley Smith. After he fell to the rear of the field due to the first-lap incident, Márquez overtook several riders and was able to finish fifth, behind Lorenzo.

Dani Pedrosa started second on the grid, but dropped to sixth place due to issues with arm-pump. Álvaro Bautista was forced to retire after his bike was hit by Márquez, breaking his left brake lever and front sensor. Rookie Jack Miller – graduating from Moto3 – crashed with Karel Abraham with one lap remaining.

The weekend also saw the début of the new Aprilia RS-GP, which was used by Gresini Racing after the team switched from Honda at the end of 2014. This was Aprilia's first race in MotoGP as a factory team since the 2004 Valencian Grand Prix.

== Classification ==
=== MotoGP ===
Pos.	No.	Rider	Team	Manufacturer	Laps	Time/Retired	Grid	Points
1	46	(Italy) Valentino Rossi	Movistar Yamaha MotoGP	Yamaha	22	42:35.717	8	25
2	04	(Italy) Andrea Dovizioso	Ducati Team	Ducati	22	+0.174	1	20
3	29	(Italy) Andrea Iannone	Ducati Team	Ducati	22	+2.250	4	16
4	99	(Spain) Jorge Lorenzo	Movistar Yamaha MotoGP	Yamaha	22	+2.707	6	13
5	93	(Spain) Marc Márquez	Repsol Honda Team	Honda	22	+7.036	3	11
6	26	(Spain) Dani Pedrosa	Repsol Honda Team	Honda	22	+10.755	2	10
7	35	(United Kingdom) Cal Crutchlow	CWM LCR Honda	Honda	22	+12.384	12	9
8	38	(United Kingdom) Bradley Smith	Monster Yamaha Tech 3	Yamaha	22	+12.914	7	8
9	44	(Spain) Pol Espargaró	Monster Yamaha Tech 3	Yamaha	22	+13.031	10	7
10	68	(Colombia) Yonny Hernández	Pramac Racing	Ducati	22	+17.435	5	6
11	41	(Spain) Aleix Espargaró	Team Suzuki Ecstar	Suzuki	22	+19.901	11	5
12	9	(Italy) Danilo Petrucci	Pramac Racing	Ducati	22	+24.432	9	4
13	45	(United Kingdom) Scott Redding	EG 0,0 Marc VDS	Honda	22	+32.032	14	3
14	25	(Spain) Maverick Viñales	Team Suzuki Ecstar	Suzuki	22	+33.463	13	2
15	8	(Spain) Héctor Barberá	Avintia Racing	Ducati	22	+33.625	15	1
16	6	(Germany) Stefan Bradl	Athinà Forward Racing	Yamaha Forward	22	+33.944	18	
17	69	(United States) Nicky Hayden	Aspar MotoGP Team	Honda	22	+38.970	17	
18	50	(Republic of Ireland) Eugene Laverty	Aspar MotoGP Team	Honda	22	+46.570	19	
19	63	(France) Mike Di Meglio	Avintia Racing	Ducati	22	+59.211	16	
20	15	(San Marino) Alex de Angelis	Octo IodaRacing Team	ART	22	+1:14.981	24	
21	33	(Italy) Marco Melandri	Aprilia Racing Team Gresini	Aprilia	22	+1:48.143	25	
22	76	(France) Loris Baz	Athinà Forward Racing	Yamaha Forward	19	+3 laps	23	
Ret	17	(Czech Republic) Karel Abraham	AB Motoracing	Honda	21	Accident	20	
Ret	43	(Australia) Jack Miller	CWM LCR Honda	Honda	21	Accident	22	
Ret	19	(Spain) Álvaro Bautista	Aprilia Racing Team Gresini	Aprilia	0	Retirement	21	

=== Moto2 ===
Pos.	No.	Rider	Manufacturer	Laps	Time/Retired	Grid	Points
1	94	(Germany) Jonas Folger	Kalex	20	40:18.532	5	25
2	19	(Belgium) Xavier Siméon	Kalex	20	+5.051	6	20
3	12	(Switzerland) Thomas Lüthi	Kalex	20	+12.123	7	16
4	40	(Spain) Álex Rins	Kalex	20	+12.202	9	13
5	21	(Italy) Franco Morbidelli	Kalex	20	+14.385	8	11
6	36	(Finland) Mika Kallio	Kalex	20	+14.413	16	10
7	11	(Germany) Sandro Cortese	Kalex	20	+14.471	4	9
8	5	(France) Johann Zarco	Kalex	20	+18.541	2	8
9	96	(France) Louis Rossi	Tech 3	20	+20.914	13	7
10	7	(Italy) Lorenzo Baldassarri	Kalex	20	+21.336	20	6
11	73	(Spain) Álex Márquez	Kalex	20	+21.847	12	5
12	55	(Malaysia) Hafizh Syahrin	Kalex	20	+23.226	19	4
13	60	(Spain) Julián Simón	Speed Up	20	+25.573	21	3
14	30	(Japan) Takaaki Nakagami	Kalex	20	+29.784	18	2
15	77	(Switzerland) Dominique Aegerter	Kalex	20	+30.267	25	1
16	23	(Germany) Marcel Schrötter	Tech 3	20	+34.561	17	
17	4	(Switzerland) Randy Krummenacher	Kalex	20	+36.850	24	
18	25	(Malaysia) Azlan Shah	Kalex	20	+48.346	23	
19	10	(Thailand) Thitipong Warokorn	Kalex	20	+48.772	26	
20	70	(Switzerland) Robin Mulhauser	Kalex	20	+49.670	28	
21	66	(Germany) Florian Alt	Suter	20	+1:15.596	30	
22	2	(Switzerland) Jesko Raffin	Kalex	20	+1:15.641	29	
23	51	(Malaysia) Zaqhwan Zaidi	Suter	20	+1:21.693	27	
Ret	88	(Spain) Ricard Cardús	Tech 3	19	Retirement	14	
Ret	95	(Australia) Anthony West	Speed Up	9	Retirement	22	
Ret	3	(Italy) Simone Corsi	Kalex	3	Accident	10	
Ret	1	(Spain) Tito Rabat	Kalex	3	Accident	3	
Ret	39	(Spain) Luis Salom	Kalex	3	Accident	15	
Ret	49	(Spain) Axel Pons	Kalex	3	Accident	11	
Ret	22	(United Kingdom) Sam Lowes	Speed Up	2	Retirement	1	
OFFICIAL MOTO2 REPORT

=== Moto3 ===
Pos.	No.	Rider	Manufacturer	Laps	Time/Retired	Grid	Points
1	10	(France) Alexis Masbou	Honda	18	38:25.424	1	25
2	33	(Italy) Enea Bastianini	Honda	18	+0.027	21	20
3	52	(United Kingdom) Danny Kent	Honda	18	+0.142	9	16
4	7	(Spain) Efrén Vázquez	Honda	18	+0.288	10	13
5	17	(United Kingdom) John McPhee	Honda	18	+0.693	5	11
6	32	(Spain) Isaac Viñales	Husqvarna	18	+0.765	2	10
7	20	(France) Fabio Quartararo	Honda	18	+0.772	6	9
8	23	(Italy) Niccolò Antonelli	Honda	18	+0.773	3	8
9	21	(Italy) Francesco Bagnaia	Mahindra	18	+0.909	4	7
10	41	(South Africa) Brad Binder	KTM	18	+1.317	13	6
11	55	(Italy) Andrea Locatelli	Honda	18	+1.546	7	5
12	9	(Spain) Jorge Navarro	Honda	18	+1.608	12	4
13	98	(Czech Republic) Karel Hanika	KTM	18	+1.869	14	3
14	65	(Germany) Philipp Öttl	KTM	18	+2.504	22	2
15	88	(Spain) Jorge Martín	Mahindra	18	+5.119	25	1
16	44	(Portugal) Miguel Oliveira	KTM	18	+6.814	8	
17	84	(Czech Republic) Jakub Kornfeil	KTM	18	+8.760	26	
18	58	(Spain) Juan Francisco Guevara	Mahindra	18	+9.259	24	
19	40	(South Africa) Darryn Binder	Mahindra	18	+11.385	20	
20	95	(France) Jules Danilo	Honda	18	+27.616	18	
21	12	(Italy) Matteo Ferrari	Mahindra	18	+29.071	30	
22	6	(Spain) María Herrera	Husqvarna	18	+29.266	32	
23	24	(Japan) Tatsuki Suzuki	Mahindra	18	+29.436	31	
24	16	(Italy) Andrea Migno	KTM	18	+29.485	29	
25	19	(Italy) Alessandro Tonucci	Mahindra	18	+29.770	23	
26	53	(Italy) Marco Bezzecchi	Mahindra	18	+46.295	33	
27	91	(Argentina) Gabriel Rodrigo	KTM	18	+46.406	27	
28	63	(Malaysia) Zulfahmi Khairuddin	KTM	18	+1:04.409	28	
29	61	(Belgium) Loris Cresson	KTM	18	+1:40.606	34	
Ret	5	(Italy) Romano Fenati	KTM	17	Retirement	17	
Ret	11	(Belgium) Livio Loi	Honda	10	Accident	11	
Ret	76	(Japan) Hiroki Ono	Honda	8	Accident	15	
Ret	2	(Australia) Remy Gardner	Mahindra	8	Accident	19	
Ret	31	(Finland) Niklas Ajo	KTM	1	Accident	16	
OFFICIAL MOTO3 REPORT

== Championship standings after the race (MotoGP) ==
Below are the standings for the top five riders and constructors after round one has concluded.

Riders' Championship standings

Pos.	Rider	Points
1	(Italy) Valentino Rossi	25
2	(Italy) Andrea Dovizioso	20
3	(Italy) Andrea Iannone	16
4	(Spain) Jorge Lorenzo	13

Constructors' Championship standings

Pos.	Constructor	Points
1	(Japan) Yamaha	25
2	(Italy) Ducati	20
3	(Japan) Honda	11
4	(Japan) Suzuki	5

Teams' Championship standings

Pos.	Team	Points
1	(Japan) Movistar Yamaha MotoGP	38
2	(Italy) Ducati Team	36
3	(Japan) Repsol Honda Team	21
4	(France) Monster Yamaha Tech 3	15

- Note: Only the top four positions are included for all sets of standings.

Previous race: 2014 Valencian Grand Prix	FIM Grand Prix World Championship; 2015 season	Next race: 2015 Grand Prix of the Americas
Previous race: 2014 Qatar Grand Prix	Qatar motorcycle Grand Prix	Next race: 2016 Qatar Grand Prix
