= 2020 Supersport World Championship =

Twenty-fourth season of the Supersport World Championship

2020 Supersport World Championship
Previous:	2019	Next:	2021
Support series: Superbike World Championship; Supersport 300 World Championship

The 2020 Supersport World Championship was the twenty-fourth season of the Supersport World Championship, the twenty-second held under this name.

== Race calendar and results ==
Due to the coronavirus pandemic, the Qatar round was postponed to an unannounced date and the Jerez, Assen, Aragon and Misano rounds were rescheduled to a later date, while the Imola and Oschersleben rounds were cancelled. As a result of updates made to the MotoGP calendar for the same reason, the French round date was also affected. Despite having already been rescheduled, the Assen round was later postponed to a to-be-determined date, along with the Donington round.

On 19 June, an updated calendar was published; for the restart, Jerez and Portimão were brought forward from their respective dates and a second round at Aragon was added to the schedule. Other five rounds—the first at Aragon, as well as Barcelona, Magny-Cours, San Juan and Misano—either kept their original or revised dates, although the latter two events were labelled as 'to be confirmed'. Three rounds—Losail, Donington and Assen—were included without a confirmed date and were subsequently cancelled on 24 July. The San Juan round was cancelled on the 13 August whilst the Misano round was cancelled and replaced by a round in Estoril on 18 August.

Along with the calendar, the event timetable was also revised, as an additional race to be held on Saturday was added to each remaining weekend.

2020 calendar
Rnd	Country	Circuit	Date	Superpole	Fastest lap	Winning rider	Winning team	Winning constructor
1	Australia	Phillip Island Grand Prix Circuit	1 March	(Italy) Andrea Locatelli	(Italy) Andrea Locatelli	(Italy) Andrea Locatelli	BARDAHL Evan Bros. WorldSSP Team	(Japan) Yamaha
2	Spain	Circuito de Jerez	1 August (Note: The Jerez round was originally due to take place on 27–29 March 2020. It was first postponed to 23–25 October and later moved to 31 July–2 August in response to the COVID-19 pandemic.)	(Italy) Andrea Locatelli	(Italy) Andrea Locatelli	(Italy) Andrea Locatelli	BARDAHL Evan Bros. WorldSSP Team	(Japan) Yamaha
2	Spain	Circuito de Jerez	2 August	(Italy) Andrea Locatelli	(Italy) Andrea Locatelli	(Italy) Andrea Locatelli	BARDAHL Evan Bros. WorldSSP Team	(Japan) Yamaha
3	Portugal	Algarve International Circuit	8 August (Note: The Portimão round was originally due to take place on 4–6 September 2020. It was moved to 7–9 August in response to the COVID-19 pandemic.)	(Italy) Andrea Locatelli	(Italy) Andrea Locatelli	(Italy) Andrea Locatelli	BARDAHL Evan Bros. WorldSSP Team	(Japan) Yamaha
3	Portugal	Algarve International Circuit	9 August	(Italy) Andrea Locatelli	(Italy) Andrea Locatelli	(Italy) Andrea Locatelli	BARDAHL Evan Bros. WorldSSP Team	(Japan) Yamaha
4	Spain	MotorLand Aragón	29 August (Note: The Aragon round was originally due to take place on 22–24 May 2020. It was postponed to 28–30 August in response to the COVID-19 pandemic.)	(Italy) Andrea Locatelli	(Italy) Andrea Locatelli	(Italy) Andrea Locatelli	BARDAHL Evan Bros. WorldSSP Team	(Japan) Yamaha
4	Spain	MotorLand Aragón	30 August	(Italy) Andrea Locatelli	(Italy) Andrea Locatelli	(Italy) Andrea Locatelli	BARDAHL Evan Bros. WorldSSP Team	(Japan) Yamaha
5	Spain	MotorLand Aragón	5 September (Note: The second Aragon round was added to the calendar on 19 June 2020.)	(Italy) Andrea Locatelli	(Italy) Andrea Locatelli	(Italy) Andrea Locatelli	BARDAHL Evan Bros. WorldSSP Team	(Japan) Yamaha
5	Spain	MotorLand Aragón	6 September	(Italy) Andrea Locatelli	(Italy) Andrea Locatelli	(Italy) Andrea Locatelli	BARDAHL Evan Bros. WorldSSP Team	(Japan) Yamaha
6	Spain	Circuit de Barcelona-Catalunya	19 September	(Italy) Andrea Locatelli	(Italy) Andrea Locatelli	(France) Andy Verdoïa	bLU cRU WorldSSP by MS Racing	(Japan) Yamaha
6	Spain	Circuit de Barcelona-Catalunya	20 September	(Italy) Andrea Locatelli	(Spain) Isaac Viñales	(Italy) Andrea Locatelli	BARDAHL Evan Bros. WorldSSP Team	(Japan) Yamaha
7	France	Circuit de Nevers Magny-Cours	3 October (Note: The Magny-Cours round was originally due to take place on 25–27 September 2020. It was postponed to 2–4 October in response to the COVID-19 pandemic.)	(United Kingdom) Kyle Smith	(Italy) Andrea Locatelli	(Italy) Andrea Locatelli	BARDAHL Evan Bros. WorldSSP Team	(Japan) Yamaha
7	France	Circuit de Nevers Magny-Cours	4 October	(United Kingdom) Kyle Smith	(Estonia) Hannes Soomer	(France) Lucas Mahias	Kawasaki Puccetti Racing	(Japan) Kawasaki
8	Portugal	Circuito do Estoril	17 October (Note: The Estoril round was added to the calendar on 18 August 2020. It replaced the Misano round which was cancelled in response to the COVID-19 pandemic.)	(Italy) Andrea Locatelli	(Spain) Isaac Viñales	(Italy) Andrea Locatelli	BARDAHL Evan Bros. WorldSSP Team	(Japan) Yamaha
8	Portugal	Circuito do Estoril	18 October	(Italy) Andrea Locatelli	(Spain) Isaac Viñales	(France) Lucas Mahias	Kawasaki Puccetti Racing	(Japan) Kawasaki
Races under contract to run in 2020, but cancelled:
—	Qatar	Losail International Circuit	N/A (Note: The Qatar round was originally due to take place on 13–15 March 2020. It was postponed to an unannounced date and subsequently cancelled in response to the COVID-19 pandemic.)	—N/a				
—	Netherlands	TT Circuit Assen	N/A (Note: The Assen round was originally due to take place on 17–19 April 2020. It was postponed first to 21–23 August, later to an unannounced date and subsequently cancelled in response to the COVID-19 pandemic.)	—N/a				
—	Italy	Autodromo Enzo e Dino Ferrari	N/A (Note: The Imola round was originally due to take place on 8–10 May 2020. It was cancelled in response to the COVID-19 pandemic.)	—N/a				
—	United Kingdom	Donington Park	N/A (Note: The Donington round was originally due to take place on 3–5 July 2020. It was postponed to an unannounced date and subsequently cancelled in response to the COVID-19 pandemic.)	—N/a				
—	Germany	Motorsport Arena Oschersleben	N/A (Note: The Oschersleben round was originally due to take place on 31 July–2 August 2020. It was cancelled in response to the COVID-19 pandemic.)	—N/a				
—	Argentina	Circuito San Juan Villicum	N/A (Note: The Argentina round was originally due to take place on 9–11 October 2020. It was cancelled on 13 August 2020 in response to the COVID-19 pandemic.)	—N/a				
—	Italy	Misano World Circuit Marco Simoncelli	N/A (Note: The Misano round was originally due to take place on 12–14 June 2020. It was initially postponed to 6–8 November, but was later cancelled on 18 August 2020 in response to the COVID-19 pandemic.)	—N/a				

== Entry list ==
2020 entry list
Team	Constructor	Motorcycle	No.	Rider	Rounds
MV Agusta Reparto Corse	MV Agusta	F3 675	1	(Switzerland) Randy Krummenacher	1
MV Agusta Reparto Corse	MV Agusta	F3 675	3	(Italy) Raffaele De Rosa	All
MV Agusta Reparto Corse	MV Agusta	F3 675	22	(Italy) Federico Fuligni	All
EAB Ten Kate Racing	Yamaha	YZF-R6	4	(South Africa) Steven Odendaal	All
Kawasaki Puccetti Racing	Kawasaki	ZX-6R	5	(Germany) Philipp Öttl	All
Kawasaki Puccetti Racing	Kawasaki	ZX-6R	44	(France) Lucas Mahias	All
Dynavolt Honda	Honda	CBR600RR	6	(Spain) María Herrera	3
Dynavolt Honda	Honda	CBR600RR	52	(Germany) Patrick Hobelsberger	All
Dynavolt Honda	Honda	CBR600RR	77	(Spain) Miquel Pons	6
Dynavolt Honda	Honda	CBR600RR	78	(Japan) Hikari Okubo	1–2, 4–5, 7–8
Altogoo Racing Team	Yamaha	YZF-R6	6	(Spain) María Herrera	5
bLU cRU WorldSSP by MS Racing	Yamaha	YZF-R6	9	(Indonesia) Galang Hendra Pratama	All
bLU cRU WorldSSP by MS Racing	Yamaha	YZF-R6	25	(France) Andy Verdoïa	All
GMT94 Yamaha	Yamaha	YZF-R6	11	(United Kingdom) Kyle Smith	6–7
GMT94 Yamaha	Yamaha	YZF-R6	16	(France) Jules Cluzel	1–5, 8
GMT94 Yamaha	Yamaha	YZF-R6	85	(Spain) Óscar Gutiérrez	6
GMT94 Yamaha	Yamaha	YZF-R6	94	(France) Corentin Perolari	All
OXXO Yamaha Team Tóth	Yamaha	YZF-R6	21	(France) Vincent Falcone	8
OXXO Yamaha Team Tóth	Yamaha	YZF-R6	56	(Hungary) Péter Sebestyén	All
OXXO Yamaha Team Tóth	Yamaha	YZF-R6	84	(Belgium) Loris Cresson	1–7
Parkalgar Yamaha – Evan Bros	Yamaha	YZF-R6	28	(Angola) Victor Barros	8
MPM Routz Racing Team	Yamaha	YZF-R6	30	(Netherlands) Glenn van Straalen	6–8
MPM Routz Racing Team	Yamaha	YZF-R6	74	(Netherlands) Jaimie van Sikkelerus	1
MPM Routz Racing Team	Yamaha	YZF-R6	83	(Australia) Lachlan Epis	2–5
Kallio Racing	Yamaha	YZF-R6	32	(Spain) Isaac Viñales	All
Kallio Racing	Yamaha	YZF-R6	38	(Estonia) Hannes Soomer	All
Moto Team Jura Vitesse	Yamaha	YZF-R6	42	(Switzerland) Stéphane Frossard	7
Blackflag Motorsport	Kawasaki	ZX-6R	43	(Italy) Stefano Valtulini	4
BARDAHL Evan Bros. WorldSSP Team	Yamaha	YZF-R6	55	(Italy) Andrea Locatelli	All
DEZA–ISMABON Racing Team	Kawasaki	ZX-6R	57	(Spain) Guillem Erill	6
Turkish Racing Team	Kawasaki	ZX-6R	61	(Turkey) Can Öncü	All
Cube Racing	Yamaha	YZF-R6	68	(Australia) Oli Bayliss	1
Wójcik Racing Team	Yamaha	YZF-R6	71	(Sweden) Christoffer Bergman	1–2
H43 Team Nobby	Yamaha	YZF-R6	77	(Spain) Miquel Pons	3
Kawasaki ParkinGO Team	Kawasaki	ZX-6R	81	(Spain) Manuel González	All
WRP Wepol Racing	Yamaha	YZF-R6	98	(Czech Republic) Karel Hanika	7–8
WRP Wepol Racing	Yamaha	YZF-R6	99	(United Kingdom) Danny Webb	All
WorldSSP Challenge entries
DK Motorsport	Yamaha	YZF-R6	2	(Italy) Luigi Montella	2–7
Altogoo Racing Team	Yamaha	YZF-R6	6	(Spain) María Herrera	4
Altogoo Racing Team	Yamaha	YZF-R6	34	(Italy) Kevin Manfredi	3, 5–8
Altogoo Racing Team	Yamaha	YZF-R6	48	(France) Xavier Navand	2
Emperador Racing Team	Yamaha	YZF-R6	12	(Spain) Alejandro Ruiz Carranza	2–8
Soradis Yamaha Motoxracing	Yamaha	YZF-R6	47	(Italy) Axel Bassani	2–8

Key
Regular rider
Wildcard rider
Replacement rider

- All entries used Pirelli tyres.

== Championship standings ==
Points

Position	**1st**	**2nd**	**3rd**	**4th**	**5th**	**6th**	**7th**	**8th**	**9th**	**10th**	**11th**	**12th**	**13th**	**14th**	**15th**
Points	25	20	16	13	11	10	9	8	7	6	5	4	3	2	1

=== Riders' championship ===
Pos.	Rider	Bike	PHI (Australia)	JER (Spain)		POR (Portugal)		ARA (Spain)		ARA (Spain)		CAT (Spain)		MAG (France)		EST (Portugal)		Pts.
1	(Italy) Andrea Locatelli	Yamaha	**1**	**1**	**1**	**1**	**1**	**1**	**1**	**1**	**1**	**4**	**1**	1	Ret	**1**	**2**	333
2	(France) Lucas Mahias	Kawasaki	4	4	3	2	Ret	5	4	4	2	2	2	2	1	Ret	1	229
3	(Germany) Philipp Öttl	Kawasaki	Ret	3	4	7	5	3	5	5	4	8	3	14	11	2	5	162
4	(France) Jules Cluzel	Yamaha	2	2	2	6	2	2	2	3	Ret					9	9	160
5	(South Africa) Steven Odendaal	Yamaha	6	6	8	8	4	6	8	Ret	9	6	5	12	4	5	4	136
6	(Italy) Raffaele De Rosa	MV Agusta	DSQ	5	5	3	12	4	3	2	Ret	14	4	4	Ret	Ret	3	135
7	(Spain) Manuel González	Kawasaki	7	8	10	10	6	8	10	6	8	7	7	7	6	7	7	126
8	(Spain) Isaac Viñales	Yamaha	8	Ret	7	5	3	7	6	Ret	3	15	6	13	Ret	4	6	116
9	(Estonia) Hannes Soomer	Yamaha	5	10	9	9	8	Ret	Ret	19	5	13	10	3	3	3	8	115
10	(France) Corentin Perolari	Yamaha	3	7	6	4	7	10	7	9	7	16	8	11	Ret	10	13	110
11	(United Kingdom) Danny Webb	Yamaha	10	12	11	11	22	9	9	8	10	18	9	10	8	11	10	80
12	(Turkey) Can Öncü	Kawasaki	9	9	12	Ret	10	13	13	Ret	Ret	12	Ret	6	7	6	14	65
13	(Hungary) Péter Sebestyén	Yamaha	12	Ret	DNS	12	11	Ret	11	7	6	20	11	9	Ret	Ret	Ret	49
14	(Italy) Kevin Manfredi	Yamaha				Ret	13			13	Ret	5	13	5	10	14	18	39
15	(United Kingdom) Kyle Smith	Yamaha										3	Ret	**Ret**	**2**			36
16	(France) Andy Verdoïa	Yamaha	13	Ret	15	Ret	20	20	19	15	15	1	14	18	Ret	15	15	35
17	(Italy) Axel Bassani	Yamaha		Ret	Ret	13	19	18	Ret	14	13	10	12	15	14	8	12	33
18	(Italy) Federico Fuligni	MV Agusta	DSQ	13	14	Ret	16	12	12	10	14	17	Ret	8	Ret	13	17	32
19	(Spain) Alejandro Ruiz Carranza	Yamaha		11	13	DNS	DNS	11	14	11	11	23	18	16	Ret	Ret	16	25
20	(Czech Republic) Karel Hanika	Yamaha												Ret	5	Ret	11	16
21	(Spain) Miquel Pons	Yamaha				14	9											16
21	(Spain) Miquel Pons	Honda										9	17					16
22	(Japan) Hikari Okubo	Honda	Ret	Ret	Ret			17	15	Ret	DNS			Ret	9	12	Ret	12
23	(Belgium) Loris Cresson	Yamaha	15	14	18	15	14	19	17	16	16	11	15	17	Ret			12
24	(Indonesia) Galang Hendra Pratama	Yamaha	16	Ret	16	17	15	16	21	12	12	Ret	Ret	Ret	13	16	Ret	12
25	(Germany) Patrick Hobelsberger	Honda	11	Ret	Ret	16	17	15	18	Ret	19	21	Ret	DNS	DNS	18	20	6
26	(Netherlands) Glenn van Straalen	Yamaha										22	16	Ret	12	17	19	4
27	(Spain) María Herrera	Honda				19	18											2
27	(Spain) María Herrera	Yamaha						14	20	17	17							2
28	(Netherlands) Jaimie van Sikkelerus	Yamaha	14															2
29	(Italy) Luigi Montella	Yamaha		15	19	Ret	21	21	22	18	Ret	24	19	DNQ	DNQ			1
	(Italy) Stefano Valtulini	Yamaha						Ret	16									0
	(Australia) Lachlan Epis	Yamaha		16	17	18	Ret	Ret	Ret	Ret	18							0
	(France) Vincent Falcone	Yamaha														19	21	0
	(Spain) Óscar Gutiérrez	Yamaha										19	Ret					0
	(Spain) Guillem Erill	Kawasaki										Ret	20					0
	(Angola) Victor Barros	Yamaha														Ret	22	0
	(Switzerland) Stéphane Frossard	Yamaha												Ret	Ret			0
	(Sweden) Christoffer Bergman	Yamaha	Ret	DNS	DNS													0
	(Switzerland) Randy Krummenacher	MV Agusta	DSQ															0
	(Australia) Oli Bayliss	Yamaha	DNS															0
	(France) Xavier Navand	Yamaha		WD	WD													0
Pos.	Rider	Bike	PHI (Australia)	JER (Spain)		POR (Portugal)		ARA (Spain)		ARA (Spain)		CAT (Spain)		MAG (France)		EST (Portugal)		Pts.

Colour	Result
Gold	Winner
Silver	Second place
Bronze	Third place
Green	Points classification
Blue	Non-points classification
Blue	Non-classified finish (NC)
Purple	Retired, not classified (Ret)
Red	Did not qualify (DNQ)
Red	Did not pre-qualify (DNPQ)
Black	Disqualified (DSQ)
White	Did not start (DNS)
White	Withdrew (WD)
White	Race cancelled (C)
Blank	Did not practice (DNP)
Blank	Did not arrive (DNA)
Blank	Excluded (EX)

**Bold** – Pole position
Italics – Fastest lap

=== Teams' championship ===
Pos.	Teams	Bike No.	PHI (Australia)	JER (Spain)		POR (Portugal)		ARA (Spain)		ARA (Spain)		CAT (Spain)		MAG (France)		EST (Portugal)		Pts.
Pos.	Teams	Bike No.	PHI (Australia)	R1	R2	R1	R2	R1	R2	R1	R2	R1	R2	R1	R2	R1	R2	Pts.
1	(Italy) Kawasaki Puccetti Racing	44	4	4	3	2	Ret	5	4	4	2	2	2	2	1	Ret	1	391
1	(Italy) Kawasaki Puccetti Racing	5	Ret	3	4	7	5	3	5	5	4	8	3	14	11	2	5	391
2	(Italy) Evan Bros. WorldSSP Team	55	**1**	**1**	**1**	**1**	**1**	**1**	**1**	**1**	**1**	**4**	**1**	1	Ret	**1**	**2**	333
2	(Italy) Evan Bros. WorldSSP Team	28														Ret	22	333
3	(France) GMT94 Yamaha	16	2	2	2	6	2	2	2	3	Ret					9	9	306
3	(France) GMT94 Yamaha	94	3	7	6	4	7	10	7	9	7	16	8	11	Ret	10	13	306
3	(France) GMT94 Yamaha	11										3	Ret	**Ret**	**2**			306
3	(France) GMT94 Yamaha	85										19	Ret					306
4	(Finland) Kallio Racing	32	8	Ret	7	5	3	7	6	Ret	3	15	6	13	Ret	4	6	231
4	(Finland) Kallio Racing	38	5	10	9	9	8	Ret	Ret	19	5	13	10	3	3	3	8	231
5	(Italy) MV Agusta Reparto Corse	3	DSQ	5	5	3	12	4	3	2	Ret	14	4	4	Ret	Ret	3	167
5	(Italy) MV Agusta Reparto Corse	22	DSQ	13	14	Ret	16	12	12	10	14	17	Ret	8	Ret	13	17	167
5	(Italy) MV Agusta Reparto Corse	1	DSQ															167
6	(Netherlands) EAB Ten Kate Racing	4	6	6	8	8	4	6	8	Ret	9	6	5	12	4	5	4	136
7	(Spain) Kawasaki ParkinGO Team	81	7	8	10	10	6	8	10	6	8	7	7	7	6	7	7	126
8	(Czech Republic) WRP Wepol Racing	99	10	12	11	11	22	9	9	8	10	18	9	10	8	11	10	96
8	(Czech Republic) WRP Wepol Racing	98												Ret	5	Ret	11	96
9	(Turkey) Turkish Racing Team	61	9	9	12	Ret	10	13	13	Ret	Ret	12	Ret	6	7	6	14	65
10	(Hungary) OXXO Yamaha Team Tóth	56	12	Ret	DNS	12	11	Ret	11	7	6	20	11	9	Ret	Ret	Ret	61
10	(Hungary) OXXO Yamaha Team Tóth	84	15	14	18	15	14	19	17	16	16	11	15	17	Ret			61
10	(Hungary) OXXO Yamaha Team Tóth	21														19	21	61
11	(Brazil) bLU cRU WorldSSP by MS Racing	25	13	Ret	15	Ret	20	20	19	15	15	1	14	18	Ret	15	15	47
11	(Brazil) bLU cRU WorldSSP by MS Racing	9	16	Ret	16	17	15	16	21	12	12	Ret	Ret	Ret	13	16	Ret	47
12	(Italy) Altogoo Racing Team	34				Ret	13			13	Ret	5	13	5	10	14	18	41
12	(Italy) Altogoo Racing Team	6						14	20	17	17							41
12	(Italy) Altogoo Racing Team	48		WD	WD													41
13	(Italy) Soradis Yamaha Motoxracing	47		Ret	Ret	13	19	18	Ret	14	13	10	12	15	14	8	12	33
14	(Germany) Dynavolt Honda	78	Ret	Ret	Ret			17	15	Ret	DNS			Ret	9	12	Ret	25
14	(Germany) Dynavolt Honda	77										9	17					25
14	(Germany) Dynavolt Honda	52	11	Ret	Ret	16	17	15	18	Ret	19	21	Ret	DNS	DNS	18	20	25
14	(Germany) Dynavolt Honda	6				19	18											25
15	(Spain) Emperador Racing Team	12		11	13	DNS	DNS	11	14	11	11	23	18	16	Ret	Ret	16	25
16	(Spain) H43 Team Nobby	77				14	9											9
17	(Netherlands) MPM Routz Racing Team	30										22	16	Ret	12	17	19	6
17	(Netherlands) MPM Routz Racing Team	74	14															6
17	(Netherlands) MPM Routz Racing Team	83		16	17	18	Ret	Ret	Ret	Ret	18							6
18	(Spain) DK Motorsport	2		15	19	Ret	21	21	22	18	Ret	24	19	DNQ	DNQ			1
19	(Italy) Blackflag Motorsport	43						Ret	16									0
20	(Spain) DEZA-ISMABON Racing Team	57										Ret	20					0
21	(Poland) Wójcik Racing Team	71	Ret	DNS	DNS													0
22	(Switzerland) Moto Team Jura Vitesse	42												Ret	Ret			0
23	(Australia) Cube Racing	68	DNS															0
Pos.	Teams	Bike No.	PHI (Australia)	JER (Spain)		POR (Portugal)		ARA (Spain)		ARA (Spain)		CAT (Spain)		MAG (France)		EST (Portugal)		Pts.
Pos.	Teams	Bike No.	PHI (Australia)	R1	R2	R1	R2	R1	R2	R1	R2	R1	R2	R1	R2	R1	R2	Pts.

=== Manufacturers' championship ===
Pos.	Manufacturer	PHI (Australia)	JER (Spain)		POR (Portugal)		ARA (Spain)		ARA (Spain)		CAT (Spain)		MAG (France)		EST (Portugal)		Pts.
1	(Japan) Yamaha	1	1	1	1	1	1	1	1	1	1	1	1	2	1	2	365
2	(Japan) Kawasaki	4	3	3	2	5	3	4	4	2	2	2	2	1	2	1	268
3	(Italy) MV Agusta	DSQ	5	5	3	12	4	3	2	14	14	4	4	Ret	13	3	140
4	(Japan) Honda	11	Ret	Ret	16	17	15	15	Ret	19	9	17	Ret	9	12	20	25
Pos.	Manufacturer	PHI (Australia)	JER (Spain)		POR (Portugal)		ARA (Spain)		ARA (Spain)		CAT (Spain)		MAG (France)		EST (Portugal)		Pts.
