= Lorenzo Gabellini =

Argentine motorcycle racer (born 1999)

- Nationality: Italian
- Born: 8 September 1999 (age 27); Rimini, Italy
Motorcycle racing career statistics
Superbike World Championship
Active years	2020
Manufacturers	Honda
Championships	0
2020 championship position
Starts / Wins / Podiums / Poles / F. laps / Points; 9 / 0 / 0 / 0 / 0 / 0

Lorenzo Gabellini (born 9 September 1999 in Rimini) is a professional motorcycle racer from Italy. In 2020, he competed in the Superbike World Championship aboard a Honda Fireblade with Althea Mie Racing for less than half of the season until the Altea management split from their race-team partner, Moriwaki in late August.

Gabellini won the 2019 Italian CIV Supersport 600 championship.

== Superbike World Championship ==
=== Races by year ===
(key) (Races in bold indicate pole position, races in italics indicate fastest lap)

Year	Bike	1			2			3			4			5			6			7			8			Pos	Pts
Year	Bike	R1	SR	R2	R1	SR	R2	R1	SR	R2	R1	SR	R2	R1	SR	R2	R1	SR	R2	R1	SR	R2	R1	SR	R2	Pos	Pts
2020	Honda	AUS	AUS	AUS	SPA; 17	SPA; 20	SPA; 19	POR; 20	POR; 18	POR; 17	SPA; 17	SPA; 21	SPA; 19	SPA	SPA	SPA	SPA	SPA	SPA	FRA	FRA	FRA	POR	POR	POR	NC	0

== CIV National 600 ==
=== Races by year ===
(key) (Races in bold indicate pole position; races in italics indicate fastest lap)

Year	Bike	1		2		3		4		5		6		Pos	Pts
Year	Bike	R1	R2	R1	R2	R1	R2	R1	R2	R1	R2	R1	R2	Pos	Pts
2022	Ducati	MIS	MIS	VAL	VAL	MUG	MUG	MIS2; 5	MIS2; DNQ	MUG2; 3	MUG2; C	IMO; 7	IMO; 5	12th	47
