= Team Pedercini =

Italian motorcycle road racing team

(Italy) Team Pedercini
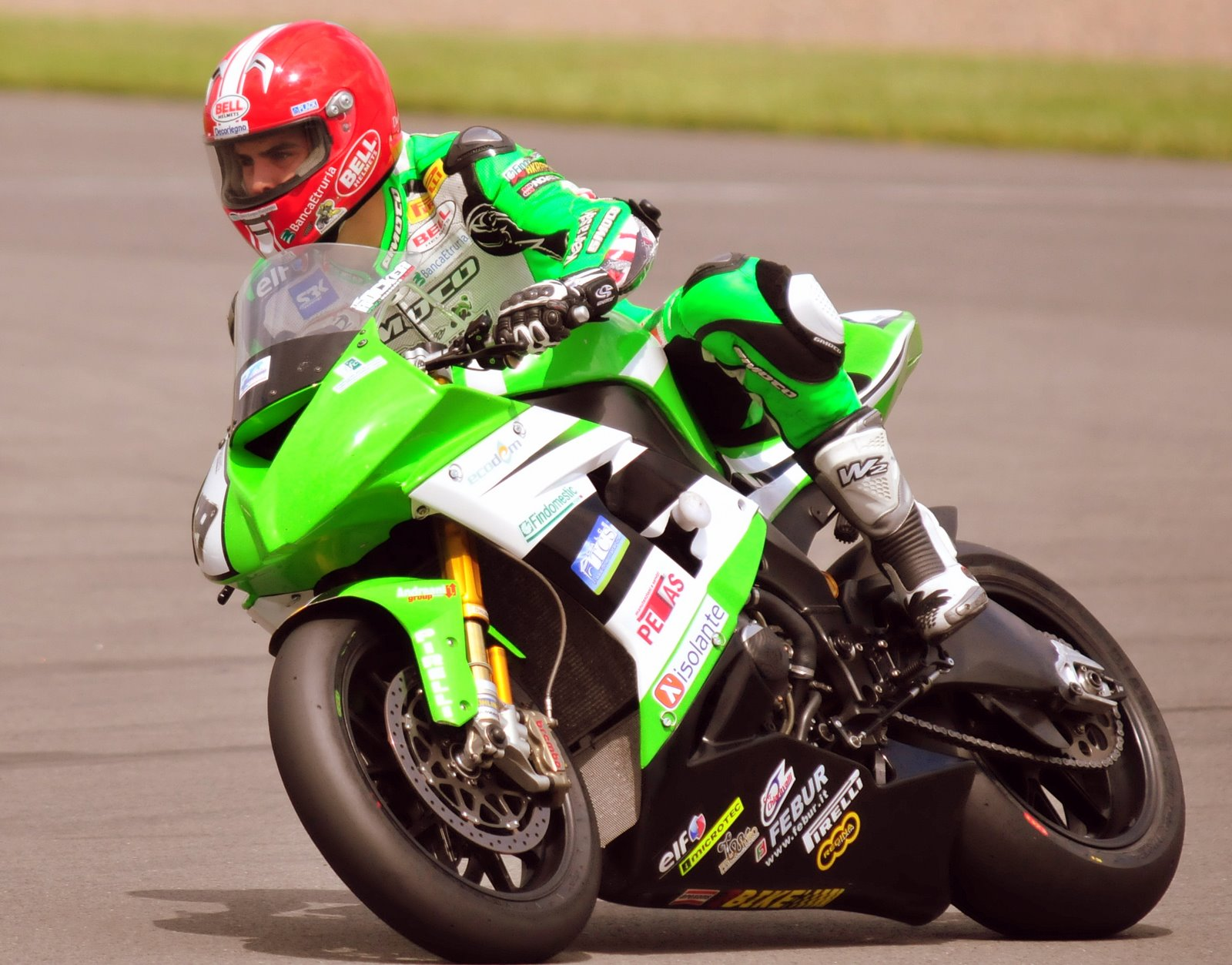
- 2026 name: Team Pedercini
- Base: Volta Mantovana, Italy
- Team principal/s: Lucio Pedercini
- Race riders: CIV Sportbike: Tommaso Occhi
- Motorcycle: Suzuki GSX–8R
- Tyres: Dunlop
- Riders' Championships: CIV Superbike: 2001: Lucio Pedercini; 2002: Lucio Pedercini; CIV Supersport 300: 2022: Leonardo Carnevali; 2024: Alfonso Coppola; WorldSSP Challenge: 2019: Kyle Smith

Team Pedercini is an Italian motorcycle racing team competing in the Superbike World Championship using Kawasaki ZX-10R and in Supersport 300 World Championship with Kawasaki Ninja 400 motorcycles.

== History ==
The team was founded in 1993 by Lucio Pedercini. Pedercini rode in the 500cc World Championship with a ROC-Yamaha until 1998, when he switched to World Superbike Championship. The team then extended its participation in the following years also to the Italian Championship, where it won the 2001 and 2002 CIV Superbike Championship, and the FIM Superstock 1000 Championship. Pedercini raced with his team until 2006, when he retired from racing. The team used Ducati motorbikes until 2008, when they started using Kawasaki machinery.

In 2014, the team competed in the World Superbike Championship with riders Alessandro Andreozzi and Luca Scassa. The also fielded a team in the FIM Superstock 1000 Cup consisting of Lorenzo Savadori, Balazs Nemeth, Romain Lanusse and Javier Alviz. In 2015, the team was chosen by Kawasaki to be their satellite team competing in the World Superbike Championship with Javier Alviz and David Salom riding Kawasaki Ninja ZX-10R motorcycles.

== World Superbike ==
(key) (Races in bold indicate pole position; races in italics indicate fastest lap)

Year	Bike	Team	Tyres	No.	Riders	1			2			3			4			5			6			7			8			9			10			11			12			13			Points	RC	Points	MC
Year	Bike	Team	Tyres	No.	Riders	R1	SR	R2	R1	SR	R2	R1	SR	R2	R1	SR	R2	R1	SR	R2	R1	SR	R2	R1	SR	R2	R1	SR	R2	R1	SR	R2	R1	SR	R2	R1	SR	R2	R1	SR	R2	R1	SR	R2	Points	RC	Points	MC
2022	Kawasaki ZX-10RR	TPR Team Pedercini Racing	P	11	(United Kingdom) Kyle Smith	SPA	SPA	SPA	NED	NED	NED	POR	POR	POR	ITA	ITA	ITA	GBR	GBR	GBR	CZE	CZE	CZE	FRA	FRA	FRA	SPA	SPA	SPA	POR	POR	POR	ARG	ARG	ARG	INA; Ret	INA; 19	INA; Ret	AUS; 12	AUS; 18	AUS; 17				4	25th	8	15th
2022	Kawasaki ZX-10RR	TPR Team Pedercini Racing	P	25	(Italy) Alessandro Delbianco	SPA	SPA	SPA	NED	NED	NED	POR	POR	POR	ITA; Ret	ITA; Ret	ITA; Ret	GBR	GBR	GBR	CZE	CZE	CZE	FRA	FRA	FRA	SPA	SPA	SPA	POR	POR	POR	ARG	ARG	ARG	INA	INA	INA	AUS	AUS	AUS				0	NC	8	15th
2022	Kawasaki ZX-10RR	TPR Team Pedercini Racing	P	32	(Spain) Isaac Viñales	SPA	SPA	SPA	NED	NED	NED	POR; 21	POR; 13	POR; Ret	ITA	ITA	ITA	GBR	GBR	GBR	CZE	CZE	CZE	FRA	FRA	FRA	SPA	SPA	SPA	POR	POR	POR	ARG	ARG	ARG	INA	INA	INA	AUS	AUS	AUS				0	NC	8	15th
2022	Kawasaki ZX-10RR	TPR Team Pedercini Racing	P	39	(Argentina) Marco Solorza	SPA	SPA	SPA	NED	NED	NED	POR	POR	POR	ITA	ITA	ITA	GBR	GBR	GBR	CZE	CZE	CZE	FRA	FRA	FRA	SPA	SPA	SPA	POR	POR	POR	ARG; 21	ARG; 22	ARG; 22	INA	INA	INA	AUS	AUS	AUS				0	NC	8	15th
2022	Kawasaki ZX-10RR	TPR Team Pedercini Racing	P	77	(United Kingdom) Ryan Vickers	SPA	SPA	SPA	NED	NED	NED	POR	POR	POR	ITA	ITA	ITA	GBR	GBR	GBR	CZE; 23	CZE; Ret	CZE; 17	FRA	FRA	FRA	SPA	SPA	SPA	POR	POR	POR	ARG	ARG	ARG	INA	INA	INA	AUS	AUS	AUS				0	NC	8	15th
2022	Kawasaki ZX-10RR	TPR Team Pedercini Racing	P	84	(Belgium) Loris Cresson	SPA; 23	SPA; 24	SPA; 23	NED	NED	NED	POR	POR	POR	ITA	ITA	ITA	GBR	GBR	GBR	CZE	CZE	CZE	FRA	FRA	FRA	SPA	SPA	SPA	POR	POR	POR	ARG	ARG	ARG	INA	INA	INA	AUS	AUS	AUS				0	NC	8	15th
2022	Kawasaki ZX-10RR	TPR Team Pedercini Racing	P	91	(United Kingdom) Leon Haslam	SPA	SPA	SPA	NED; 16	NED; 17	NED; 13	POR	POR	POR	ITA	ITA	ITA	GBR; 15	GBR; 13	GBR; Ret	CZE	CZE	CZE	FRA	FRA	FRA	SPA	SPA	SPA	POR; Ret	POR; 19	POR; Ret	ARG	ARG	ARG	INA	INA	INA	AUS	AUS	AUS				4	26th	8	15th
2022	Kawasaki ZX-10RR	TPR Team Pedercini Racing	P	99	(Spain) Óscar Gutiérrez	SPA	SPA	SPA	NED	NED	NED	POR	POR	POR	ITA	ITA	ITA	GBR	GBR	GBR	CZE	CZE	CZE	FRA; 23	FRA; 22	FRA; 17	SPA; 17	SPA; 18	SPA; Ret	POR	POR	POR	ARG	ARG	ARG	INA	INA	INA	AUS	AUS	AUS				0	NC	8	15th
2023	Kawasaki ZX-10RR	TPR by Viñales Racing	P	32	(Spain) Isaac Viñales	AUS	AUS	AUS	INA	INA	INA	NED; 23	NED; Ret	NED; 18	SPA; Ret	SPA; 20	SPA; Ret	ITA; 20	ITA; 17	ITA; 16	GBR; 15	GBR; 21	GBR; 16	ITA; Ret	ITA; 22	ITA; Ret	CZE; 18	CZE; 16	CZE; 17	FRA; Ret	FRA; 19	FRA; 16	SPA; 20	SPA; 20	SPA; 20	POR; Ret	POR; 20	POR; 18	ARG	ARG	ARG				1	26th	1	15th
