= 2021 Superbike World Championship =

2021 Superbike World Championship
Previous:	2020	Next:	2022
Support series: Supersport World Championship; Supersport 300 World Championship

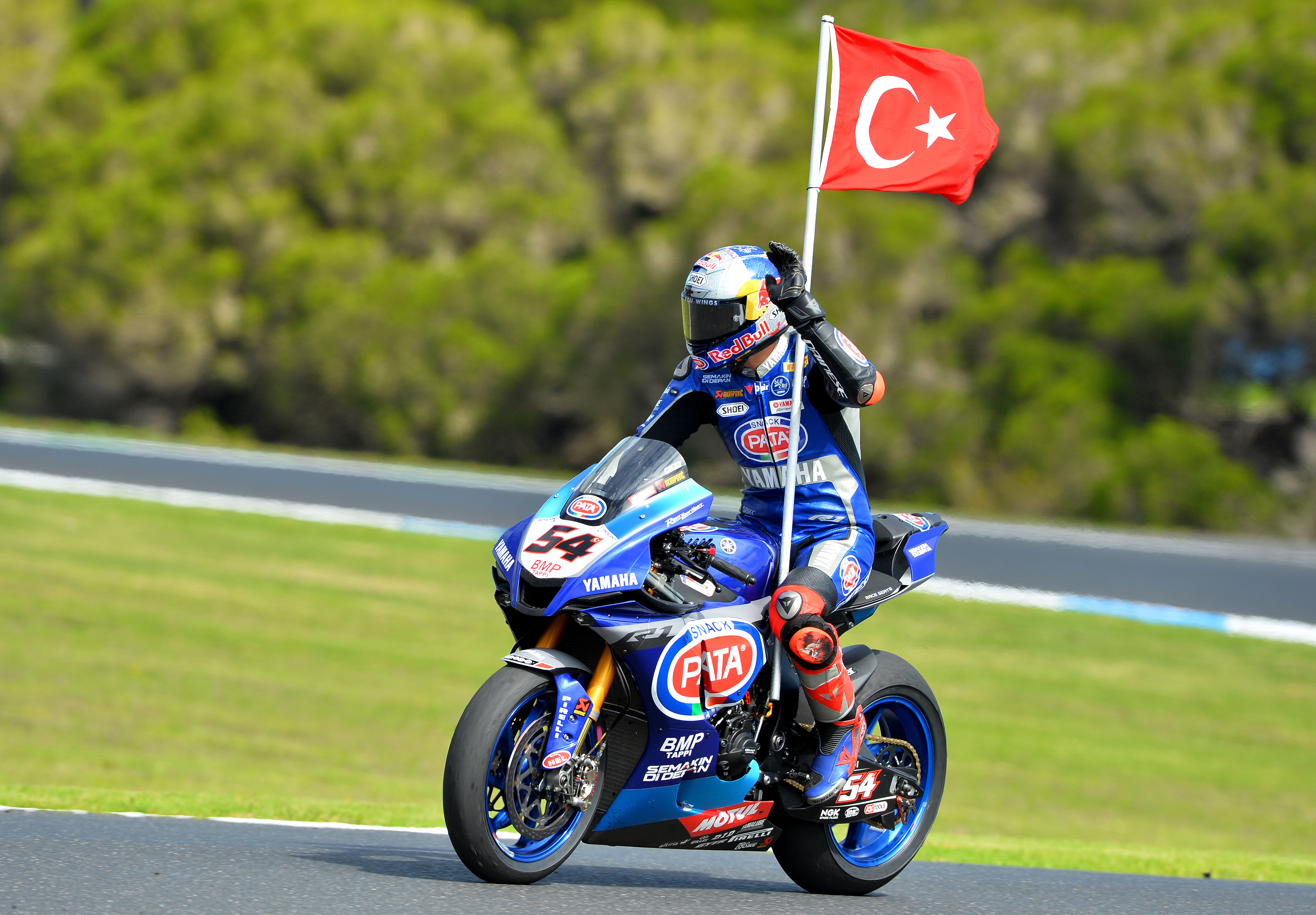
Toprak Razgatlıoğlu (pictured in 2020) was the 2021 Superbike Champion.

The 2021 Superbike World Championship (known officially as the 2021 Motul FIM Superbike World Championship for sponsorship reasons) was the 34th season of the Superbike World Championship. The championship was won by Toprak Razgatlıoğlu at Mandalika round.

== Race calendar and results ==
The provisional 2021 season calendar was announced on 30 November 2020, with 13 rounds scheduled, and was later revised in response to the COVID-19 pandemic. On 16 February 2021 the Assen round, scheduled for 23–25 April, was postponed to 23–25 July. On 9 March 2021 the Estoril round, scheduled for 7–9 May, was postponed to an unannounced date and the Navarra round—a new event for the championship—was added into the calendar. On 16 April 2021 the Estoril round was confirmed to be held on 28–30 May. On 29 April 2021 the Phillip Island round was cancelled and a round at Most—another new venue—was added into the calendar. On 25 September 2021, it was announced that the Mandalika round was pushed back a week.

2021 Superbike World Championship Calendar
Round			Circuit	Date	Superpole	Fastest lap	Winning rider	Winning team	Winning constructor
1	R1	(Aragon) Aragón Round	MotorLand Aragón	22 May	(United Kingdom) Jonathan Rea	(United Kingdom) Jonathan Rea	(United Kingdom) Jonathan Rea	Kawasaki Racing Team WorldSBK	(Japan) Kawasaki
1	SR	(Aragon) Aragón Round	MotorLand Aragón	23 May	(United Kingdom) Jonathan Rea	(Netherlands) Michael van der Mark	(United Kingdom) Jonathan Rea	Kawasaki Racing Team WorldSBK	(Japan) Kawasaki
1	R2	(Aragon) Aragón Round	MotorLand Aragón	23 May		(United Kingdom) Chaz Davies	(United Kingdom) Scott Redding	Aruba.it Racing – Ducati	(Italy) Ducati
2	R1	(Portugal) Estoril Round	Circuito do Estoril	29 May (Note: The Estoril round was originally due to take place on 7–9 May 2021. It was firstly postponed indefinitely in response to the COVID-19 pandemic, then it was rescheduled to 28-30 May 2021.)	(United Kingdom) Jonathan Rea	(Turkey) Toprak Razgatlıoğlu	(United Kingdom) Scott Redding	Aruba.it Racing – Ducati	(Italy) Ducati
2	SR	(Portugal) Estoril Round	Circuito do Estoril	30 May	(United Kingdom) Jonathan Rea	(United Kingdom) Jonathan Rea	(United Kingdom) Jonathan Rea	Kawasaki Racing Team WorldSBK	(Japan) Kawasaki
2	R2	(Portugal) Estoril Round	Circuito do Estoril	30 May		(United Kingdom) Jonathan Rea	(United Kingdom) Jonathan Rea	Kawasaki Racing Team WorldSBK	(Japan) Kawasaki
3	R1	Emilia-Romagna Round	Misano World Circuit Marco Simoncelli	12 June	(United Kingdom) Jonathan Rea	(United Kingdom) Jonathan Rea	(Italy) Michael Ruben Rinaldi	Aruba.it Racing – Ducati	(Italy) Ducati
3	SR	Emilia-Romagna Round	Misano World Circuit Marco Simoncelli	13 June	(United Kingdom) Jonathan Rea	(Italy) Michael Ruben Rinaldi	(Italy) Michael Ruben Rinaldi	Aruba.it Racing – Ducati	(Italy) Ducati
3	R2	Emilia-Romagna Round	Misano World Circuit Marco Simoncelli	13 June		(Turkey) Toprak Razgatlıoğlu	(Turkey) Toprak Razgatlıoğlu	Pata Yamaha with Brixx WorldSBK	(Japan) Yamaha
4	R1	(United Kingdom) UK Round	Donington Park	3 July	(United Kingdom) Jonathan Rea	(Turkey) Toprak Razgatlıoğlu	(Turkey) Toprak Razgatlıoğlu	Pata Yamaha with Brixx WorldSBK	(Japan) Yamaha
4	SR	(United Kingdom) UK Round	Donington Park	4 July	(United Kingdom) Jonathan Rea	(Turkey) Toprak Razgatlıoğlu	(United Kingdom) Jonathan Rea	Kawasaki Racing Team WorldSBK	(Japan) Kawasaki
4	R2	(United Kingdom) UK Round	Donington Park	4 July		(United Kingdom) Jonathan Rea	(Turkey) Toprak Razgatlıoğlu	Pata Yamaha with Brixx WorldSBK	(Japan) Yamaha
5	R1	(Netherlands) Dutch Round	TT Circuit Assen	24 July (Note: The Assen round was originally due to take place on 23–25 April 2021. It was postponed to 23–25 July in response to the COVID-19 pandemic.)	(United Kingdom) Jonathan Rea	(United Kingdom) Scott Redding	(United Kingdom) Jonathan Rea	Kawasaki Racing Team WorldSBK	(Japan) Kawasaki
5	SR	(Netherlands) Dutch Round	TT Circuit Assen	25 July	(United Kingdom) Jonathan Rea	(United Kingdom) Jonathan Rea	(United Kingdom) Jonathan Rea	Kawasaki Racing Team WorldSBK	(Japan) Kawasaki
5	R2	(Netherlands) Dutch Round	TT Circuit Assen	25 July		(United Kingdom) Jonathan Rea	(United Kingdom) Jonathan Rea	Kawasaki Racing Team WorldSBK	(Japan) Kawasaki
6	R1	(Czech Republic) Czech Round	Autodrom Most	7 August (Note: The Most round was not originally in the 2021 WSBK calendar; it was added into the calendar on the date of 29 April 2021 instead of Phillip Island round.)	(United Kingdom) Jonathan Rea	(Turkey) Toprak Razgatlıoğlu	(Turkey) Toprak Razgatlıoğlu	Pata Yamaha with Brixx WorldSBK	(Japan) Yamaha
6	SR	(Czech Republic) Czech Round	Autodrom Most	8 August	(United Kingdom) Jonathan Rea	(United Kingdom) Jonathan Rea	(Turkey) Toprak Razgatlıoğlu	Pata Yamaha with Brixx WorldSBK	(Japan) Yamaha
6	R2	(Czech Republic) Czech Round	Autodrom Most	8 August		(United Kingdom) Scott Redding	(United Kingdom) Scott Redding	Aruba.it Racing – Ducati	(Italy) Ducati
7	R1	(Navarre) Navarra Round	Circuito de Navarra	21 August (Note: The Navarra round was not originally in the 2021 WSBK calendar; it was added into the calendar on the date of 9 March 2021.)	(United Kingdom) Jonathan Rea	(United Kingdom) Jonathan Rea	(United Kingdom) Scott Redding	Aruba.it Racing – Ducati	(Italy) Ducati
7	SR	(Navarre) Navarra Round	Circuito de Navarra	22 August	(United Kingdom) Jonathan Rea	(United Kingdom) Scott Redding	(United Kingdom) Scott Redding	Aruba.it Racing – Ducati	(Italy) Ducati
7	R2	(Navarre) Navarra Round	Circuito de Navarra	22 August		(United Kingdom) Jonathan Rea	(Turkey) Toprak Razgatlıoğlu	Pata Yamaha with Brixx WorldSBK	(Japan) Yamaha
8	R1	(France) French Round	Circuit de Nevers Magny-Cours	4 September	(United Kingdom) Jonathan Rea	(Turkey) Toprak Razgatlıoğlu	(Turkey) Toprak Razgatlıoğlu	Pata Yamaha with Brixx WorldSBK	(Japan) Yamaha
8	SR	(France) French Round	Circuit de Nevers Magny-Cours	5 September	(United Kingdom) Jonathan Rea	(United Kingdom) Jonathan Rea	(United Kingdom) Jonathan Rea	Kawasaki Racing Team WorldSBK	(Japan) Kawasaki
8	R2	(France) French Round	Circuit de Nevers Magny-Cours	5 September		(United Kingdom) Jonathan Rea	(Turkey) Toprak Razgatlıoğlu	Pata Yamaha with Brixx WorldSBK	(Japan) Yamaha
9	R1	(Catalonia) Catalunya Round	Circuit de Barcelona-Catalunya	18 September	(United Kingdom) Tom Sykes	(United Kingdom) Scott Redding	(United Kingdom) Scott Redding	Aruba.it Racing – Ducati	(Italy) Ducati
9	SR	(Catalonia) Catalunya Round	Circuit de Barcelona-Catalunya	19 September	(United Kingdom) Tom Sykes	(Turkey) Toprak Razgatlıoğlu	(United Kingdom) Jonathan Rea	Kawasaki Racing Team WorldSBK	(Japan) Kawasaki
9	R2	(Catalonia) Catalunya Round	Circuit de Barcelona-Catalunya	19 September		(Italy) Michael Ruben Rinaldi	(Italy) Michael Ruben Rinaldi	Aruba.it Racing – Ducati	(Italy) Ducati
10	R1	(Spain) Spanish Round	Circuito de Jerez	26 September (Note: Race one was scheduled for 25 September, but was postponed after the cancellation of racing on that day, following the death of Dean Berta Viñales in the supporting Supersport 300 World Championship race. As a result of the revised schedule, the Superpole race was cancelled.)	(Turkey) Toprak Razgatlıoğlu	(United Kingdom) Jonathan Rea	(Turkey) Toprak Razgatlıoğlu	Pata Yamaha with Brixx WorldSBK	(Japan) Yamaha
10	SR	(Spain) Spanish Round	Circuito de Jerez	26 September	(Turkey) Toprak Razgatlıoğlu	Race cancelled			
10	R2	(Spain) Spanish Round	Circuito de Jerez	26 September	(Turkey) Toprak Razgatlıoğlu	(United Kingdom) Scott Redding	(Turkey) Toprak Razgatlıoğlu	Pata Yamaha with Brixx WorldSBK	(Japan) Yamaha
11	R1	(Portugal) Portuguese Round	Algarve International Circuit	2 October	(Turkey) Toprak Razgatlıoğlu	(United Kingdom) Scott Redding	(Turkey) Toprak Razgatlıoğlu	Pata Yamaha with Brixx WorldSBK	(Japan) Yamaha
11	SR	(Portugal) Portuguese Round	Algarve International Circuit	3 October	(Turkey) Toprak Razgatlıoğlu	(Netherlands) Michael van der Mark	(Netherlands) Michael van der Mark	BMW Motorrad WorldSBK Team	(Germany) BMW
11	R2	(Portugal) Portuguese Round	Algarve International Circuit	3 October		(United Kingdom) Jonathan Rea	(United Kingdom) Jonathan Rea	Kawasaki Racing Team WorldSBK	(Japan) Kawasaki
12	R1	(Argentina) Argentinean Round	Circuito San Juan Villicum	16 October	(United Kingdom) Scott Redding	(Turkey) Toprak Razgatlıoğlu	(Turkey) Toprak Razgatlıoğlu	Pata Yamaha with Brixx WorldSBK	(Japan) Yamaha
12	SR	(Argentina) Argentinean Round	Circuito San Juan Villicum	17 October	(United Kingdom) Scott Redding	(United Kingdom) Scott Redding	(Turkey) Toprak Razgatlıoğlu	Pata Yamaha with Brixx WorldSBK	(Japan) Yamaha
12	R2	(Argentina) Argentinean Round	Circuito San Juan Villicum	17 October		(United Kingdom) Scott Redding	(United Kingdom) Scott Redding	Aruba.it Racing – Ducati	(Italy) Ducati
13	R1	(Indonesia) Indonesian Round	Pertamina Mandalika International Street Circuit	21 November (Note: The Mandalika round was originally due to take place on 12–14 November. It was postponed to 19–21 November.)	(Turkey) Toprak Razgatlıoğlu	(Turkey) Toprak Razgatlıoğlu	(United Kingdom) Jonathan Rea	Kawasaki Racing Team WorldSBK	(Japan) Kawasaki
13	SR	(Indonesia) Indonesian Round	Pertamina Mandalika International Street Circuit	21 November	(Turkey) Toprak Razgatlıoğlu	Race cancelled (Note: Race one was scheduled for 20 November, but was postponed to the following day due to heavy rain. As a result of the revised schedule, the Superpole race was cancelled.)			
13	R2	(Indonesia) Indonesian Round	Pertamina Mandalika International Street Circuit	21 November	(Turkey) Toprak Razgatlıoğlu	(United Kingdom) Scott Redding	(United Kingdom) Jonathan Rea	Kawasaki Racing Team WorldSBK	(Japan) Kawasaki

== Entry list ==
2021 entry list
Team	Constructor	Motorcycle	No.	Rider	Rounds
(Japan) Kawasaki Racing Team WorldSBK	Kawasaki	Ninja ZX-10RR	1	(United Kingdom) Jonathan Rea	All
(Japan) Kawasaki Racing Team WorldSBK	Kawasaki	Ninja ZX-10RR	22	(United Kingdom) Alex Lowes	All
(Italy) GRT Yamaha WorldSBK Team	Yamaha	YZF-R1	3	(Japan) Kohta Nozane	All
(Italy) GRT Yamaha WorldSBK Team	Yamaha	YZF-R1	31	(United States) Garrett Gerloff	All
(Italy) Outdo TPR Team Pedercini Racing (Note: Entered as TPR Team Pedercini Racing until round 3.)	Kawasaki	Ninja ZX-10RR	4	(Argentina) Luciano Ribodino	12
(Italy) Outdo TPR Team Pedercini Racing	Kawasaki	Ninja ZX-10RR	12	(United Kingdom) Luke Mossey	4
(Italy) Outdo TPR Team Pedercini Racing	Kawasaki	Ninja ZX-10RR	14	(United States) Jayson Uribe	6–7
(Italy) Outdo TPR Team Pedercini Racing	Kawasaki	Ninja ZX-10RR	15	(Czech Republic) Oliver König	13
(Italy) Outdo TPR Team Pedercini Racing	Kawasaki	Ninja ZX-10RR	39	(Argentina) Marco Solorza	12
(Italy) Outdo TPR Team Pedercini Racing	Kawasaki	Ninja ZX-10RR	76	(Italy) Samuele Cavalieri	1–3
(Italy) Outdo TPR Team Pedercini Racing	Kawasaki	Ninja ZX-10RR	83	(Australia) Lachlan Epis	9–11
(Italy) Outdo TPR Team Pedercini Racing	Kawasaki	Ninja ZX-10RR	84	(Belgium) Loris Cresson	1–11, 13
JEG Racing	Suzuki	GSX-R1000R	6	(Japan) Naomichi Uramoto	7
(Italy) Team GoEleven	Ducati	Panigale V4 R	7	(United Kingdom) Chaz Davies	1–9, 12–13
(Italy) Team GoEleven	Ducati	Panigale V4 R	11	(France) Loris Baz	10–11
Vince64	Kawasaki	Ninja ZX-10RR	9	(Italy) Andrea Mantovani	5, 10
(Italy) B-Max Racing Team	BMW	M1000RR	16	(Italy) Gabriele Ruiu	11
(Austria) IXS–YART Yamaha	Yamaha	YZF-R1	17	(Germany) Marvin Fritz	6, 10
(Austria) IXS–YART Yamaha	Yamaha	YZF-R1	98	(Czech Republic) Karel Hanika	6
(Japan) Team HRC	Honda	CBR1000RR-R	19	(Spain) Álvaro Bautista	All
(Japan) Team HRC	Honda	CBR1000RR-R	91	(United Kingdom) Leon Haslam	All
(Italy) Aruba.it Racing – Ducati	Ducati	Panigale V4 R	21	(Italy) Michael Ruben Rinaldi	All
(Italy) Aruba.it Racing – Ducati	Ducati	Panigale V4 R	45	(United Kingdom) Scott Redding	All
(France) Gil Motor Sport–Yamaha (Note: Entered as Alstare Yamaha until round 4.)	Yamaha	YZF-R1	23	(France) Christophe Ponsson	1–4, 6–13
(Spain) Orelac Racing VerdNatura	Kawasaki	Ninja ZX-10RR	32	(Spain) Isaac Viñales	1–6, 8–13
(Japan) MIE Racing Honda Racing	Honda	CBR1000RR-R	36	(Argentina) Leandro Mercado	1, 5, 7–13
(Japan) MIE Racing Honda Racing	Honda	CBR1000RR-R	52	(Italy) Alessandro Delbianco	6
(Italy) Kawasaki Puccetti Racing	Kawasaki	Ninja ZX-10RR	44	(France) Lucas Mahias	1–5, 7–10
(Italy) Kawasaki Puccetti Racing	Kawasaki	Ninja ZX-10RR	53	(Spain) Tito Rabat	11–13
(Italy) Motocorsa Racing	Ducati	Panigale V4 R	47	(Italy) Axel Bassani	All
RC Squadra Corse	BMW	M1000RR	50	(Republic of Ireland) Eugene Laverty	1–4
(Germany) BMW Motorrad WorldSBK Team	BMW	M1000RR	50	(Republic of Ireland) Eugene Laverty	10–12
(Germany) BMW Motorrad WorldSBK Team	BMW	M1000RR	60	(Netherlands) Michael van der Mark	All
(Germany) BMW Motorrad WorldSBK Team	BMW	M1000RR	66	(United Kingdom) Tom Sykes	1–9, 13
(Italy) Barni Racing Team	Ducati	Panigale V4 R	53	(Spain) Tito Rabat	1–8
(Italy) Barni Racing Team	Ducati	Panigale V4 R	76	(Italy) Samuele Cavalieri	9–13
(Japan) Pata Yamaha with Brixx WorldSBK	Yamaha	YZF-R1	54	(Turkey) Toprak Razgatlıoğlu	All
(Japan) Pata Yamaha with Brixx WorldSBK	Yamaha	YZF-R1	55	(Italy) Andrea Locatelli	All
(Germany) Bonovo MGM Racing	BMW	M1000RR	94	(Germany) Jonas Folger	1–11

Key
Regular rider
Wildcard rider
Replacement rider

- All entries used Pirelli tyres.

== Championship standings ==
Points were awarded as follows:

Race 1 and Race 2

Position	**1st**	**2nd**	**3rd**	**4th**	**5th**	**6th**	**7th**	**8th**	**9th**	**10th**	**11th**	**12th**	**13th**	**14th**	**15th**
Points	25	20	16	13	11	10	9	8	7	6	5	4	3	2	1

Superpole Race

Position	**1st**	**2nd**	**3rd**	**4th**	**5th**	**6th**	**7th**	**8th**	**9th**
Points	12	9	7	6	5	4	3	2	1

=== Riders' championship ===
Pos.	Rider	Bike	ARA (Spain)			EST (Portugal)			MIS (Italy)			DON (United Kingdom)			ASS (Netherlands)			MOS (Czech Republic)			NAV (Spain)			MAG (France)			BAR (Spain)			JER (Spain)			POR (Portugal)			VIL (Argentina)			MAN (Indonesia)			Pts.
Pos.	Rider	Bike	R1	SR	R2	R1	SR	R2	R1	SR	R2	R1	SR	R2	R1	SR	R2	R1	SR	R2	R1	SR	R2	R1	SR	R2	R1	SR	R2	R1	SR	R2	R1	SR	R2	R1	SR	R2	R1	SR	R2	Pts.
1	(Turkey) Toprak Razgatlıoğlu	Yamaha	3	6	6	2	2	3	2	2	1	1	6	1	3	3	Ret	1	1	2	3	3	1	1	2	1	Ret	2	2	**1**	C	**1**	**1**	**6**	Ret	1	1	3	**2**	C	**4**	564
2	(United Kingdom) Jonathan Rea	Kawasaki	**1**	**1**	2	**3**	**1**	1	**3**	**3**	3	**2**	**1**	20	**1**	**1**	1	**Ret**	**3**	3	**2**	**2**	3	**2**	**1**	2	4	1	6	2	C	5	Ret	Ret	1	2	3	2	1	C	1	551
3	(United Kingdom) Scott Redding	Ducati	4	8	1	1	3	16	4	4	4	Ret	18	4	2	5	2	2	2	1	1	1	2	12	5	3	1	15	3	3	C	2	2	2	2	**9**	**2**	1	3	C	2	501
4	(Italy) Andrea Locatelli	Yamaha	10	12	9	10	11	5	9	9	9	Ret	9	11	5	4	3	3	4	4	4	4	4	3	4	4	12	Ret	5	4	C	4	Ret	4	3	8	6	7	4	C	8	291
5	(Italy) Michael Ruben Rinaldi	Ducati	7	11	16	5	5	Ret	1	1	2	12	10	8	Ret	2	8	4	10	5	10	13	7	4	10	7	3	5	1	Ret	C	7	4	Ret	7	3	8	5	12	C	Ret	282
6	(Netherlands) Michael van der Mark	BMW	11	5	5	7	13	6	10	Ret	10	5	3	5	4	Ret	6	Ret	11	7	7	8	9	5	6	8	5	Ret	9	7	C	8	Ret	1	6	6	5	6	6	C	3	262
7	(United States) Garrett Gerloff	Yamaha	9	3	7	4	4	Ret	12	8	5	7	5	2	6	8	Ret	6	6	8	9	9	Ret	11	13	9	Ret	8	7	10	C	10	6	8	5	7	7	8	11	C	6	228
8	(United Kingdom) Alex Lowes	Kawasaki	2	2	3	19	6	4	5	5	6	3	14	6	Ret	6	7	13	7	6	5	5	6	Ret	3	Ret	6	4	Ret	9	C	DNS	DNS	DNS	DNS	4	9	DNS	DNS	C	DNS	213
9	(Italy) Axel Bassani	Ducati	12	17	14	11	14	11	7	6	7	10	11	13	10	10	9	5	8	Ret	8	12	10	8	11	11	2	6	8	8	C	6	7	7	9	5	4	4	5	C	Ret	210
10	(Spain) Álvaro Bautista	Honda	Ret	7	11	8	10	7	6	10	8	8	15	10	Ret	18	5	7	9	10	Ret	10	8	6	7	6	9	3	4	5	C	3	Ret	5	Ret	Ret	11	10	7	C	10	195
11	(United Kingdom) Tom Sykes	BMW	6	Ret	4	14	7	8	8	7	12	4	2	3	7	7	15	9	5	9	6	6	5	9	12	10	**8**	**Ret**	Ret										10	C	5	184
12	(United Kingdom) Chaz Davies	Ducati	5	4	19	6	9	2	NC	Ret	Ret	11	8	7	9	9	4	Ret	14	12	Ret	7	Ret	7	8	5	10	Ret	DNS							12	13	9	8	C	12	143
13	(United Kingdom) Leon Haslam	Honda	8	10	Ret	12	16	12	14	11	Ret	6	4	9	8	12	10	8	13	11	13	14	Ret	10	9	Ret	7	7	11	11	C	12	5	Ret	8	10	10	11	DNS	C	DNS	134
14	(Japan) Kohta Nozane	Yamaha	14	9	12	15	15	13	13	12	13	WD	WD	WD	Ret	15	12	14	15	14	11	11	Ret	17	16	14	11	Ret	10	13	C	Ret	14	Ret	13	15	14	14	15	C	7	64
15	(France) Loris Baz	Ducati																												6	C	9	3	3	4							53
16	(Spain) Tito Rabat	Ducati	Ret	14	Ret	9	12	10	15	14	14	Ret	Ret	14	Ret	11	11	Ret	Ret	13	12	Ret	11	14	15	15																53
16	(Spain) Tito Rabat	Kawasaki																															13	14	Ret	11	12	12	Ret	C	13	53
17	(Spain) Isaac Viñales	Kawasaki	13	15	13	17	17	15	17	15	17	15	13	17	11	13	14	12	17	17				15	Ret	DNS	14	12	15	DNS	C	DNS	11	10	12	Ret	17	13	13	C	9	45
18	(France) Lucas Mahias	Kawasaki	15	Ret	10	13	Ret	14	11	Ret	11	9	7	12	Ret	DNS	DNS				Ret	15	14	DNS	14	13	13	Ret	Ret	DNS	C	DNS										44
19	(Republic of Ireland) Eugene Laverty	BMW	Ret	16	17	18	8	9	DNS	13	15	13	12	15																12	C	11	9	9	10	13	15	16				40
20	(France) Christophe Ponsson	Yamaha	17	19	15	Ret	20	17	18	16	18	Ret	Ret	18				11	16	15	15	17	13	13	17	12	17	9	13	15	C	Ret	10	16	14	17	19	17	Ret	C	11	36
21	(Argentina) Leandro Mercado	Honda	Ret	18	18										12	14	13				Ret	18	15	Ret	19	17	15	10	14	Ret	C	15	8	11	11	16	16	15	9	C	Ret	33
22	(Germany) Jonas Folger	BMW	16	13	8	16	18	Ret	16	19	16	Ret	16	Ret	Ret	DNS	DNS	Ret	18	16	14	16	12	16	18	16	19	13	16	14	C	13	15	13	15							21
23	(Italy) Samuele Cavalieri	Kawasaki	Ret	Ret	21	Ret	Ret	Ret	19	17	19																															16
23	(Italy) Samuele Cavalieri	Ducati																									16	11	12	Ret	C	14	12	12	16	14	18	18	14	C	14	16
24	(Germany) Marvin Fritz	Yamaha																10	12	19										16	C	16										6
25	(Belgium) Loris Cresson	Kawasaki	18	20	20	20	19	18	20	18	20	16	Ret	19	13	17	17	Ret	19	20	17	20	17	18	20	18	18	14	Ret	17	C	Ret	16	Ret	Ret							3
26	(Italy) Andrea Mantovani	Kawasaki													14	16	16													18	C	17										2
27	(United Kingdom) Luke Mossey	Kawasaki										14	17	16																												2
	(Italy) Gabriele Ruiu	BMW																															Ret	15	Ret							0
	(Australia) Lachlan Epis	Kawasaki																									20	16	Ret	19	C	18	Ret	17	Ret							0
	(United States) Jayson Uribe	Kawasaki																Ret	20	21	18	21	16																			0
	(Japan) Naomichi Uramoto	Suzuki																			16	19	Ret																			0
	(Czech Republic) Karel Hanika	Yamaha																Ret	Ret	18																						0
	(Argentina) Marco Solorza	Kawasaki																																		18	21	20				0
	(Argentina) Luciano Ribodino	Kawasaki																																		19	20	19				0
	(Italy) Alessandro Delbianco	Honda																Ret	Ret	Ret																						0
	(Czech Republic) Oliver König	Kawasaki																																					Ret	C	DNS	0
Pos.	Rider	Bike	ARA (Spain)			EST (Portugal)			MIS (Italy)			DON (United Kingdom)			ASS (Netherlands)			MOS (Czech Republic)			NAV (Spain)			MAG (France)			BAR (Spain)			JER (Spain)			POR (Portugal)			VIL (Argentina)			MAN (Indonesia)			Pts.

Colour	Result
Gold	Winner
Silver	Second place
Bronze	Third place
Green	Points classification
Blue	Non-points classification
Blue	Non-classified finish (NC)
Purple	Retired, not classified (Ret)
Red	Did not qualify (DNQ)
Red	Did not pre-qualify (DNPQ)
Black	Disqualified (DSQ)
White	Did not start (DNS)
White	Withdrew (WD)
White	Race cancelled (C)
Blank	Did not practice (DNP)
Blank	Did not arrive (DNA)
Blank	Excluded (EX)

**Bold** – Pole position
Italics – Fastest lap

=== Manufacturers' championship ===
Pos.	Manufacturer	ARA (Spain)			EST (Portugal)			MIS (Italy)			DON (United Kingdom)			ASS (Netherlands)			MOS (Czech Republic)			NAV (Spain)			MAG (France)			BAR (Spain)			JER (Spain)			POR (Portugal)			VIL (Argentina)			MAN (Indonesia)			Pts.
Pos.	Manufacturer	R1	SR	R2	R1	SR	R2	R1	SR	R2	R1	SR	R2	R1	SR	R2	R1	SR	R2	R1	SR	R2	R1	SR	R2	R1	SR	R2	R1	SR	R2	R1	SR	R2	R1	SR	R2	R1	SR	R2	Pts.
1	(Japan) Yamaha	3	3	6	2	2	3	2	2	1	1	5	1	3	3	3	1	1	2	3	3	1	1	2	1	11	2	2	1	C	1	1	4	3	1	1	3	2	C	4	607
2	(Italy) Ducati	4	4	1	1	3	2	1	1	2	10	8	4	2	2	2	2	2	1	1	1	2	4	5	3	1	5	1	3	C	2	2	2	2	3	2	1	3	C	2	594
3	(Japan) Kawasaki	1	1	2	3	1	1	3	3	3	2	1	6	1	1	1	12	3	3	2	2	3	2	1	2	4	1	6	2	C	5	11	10	1	2	3	2	1	C	1	570
4	(Germany) BMW	6	5	4	7	7	6	8	7	10	4	2	3	4	7	6	9	5	7	6	6	5	5	6	8	5	13	9	7	C	8	9	1	6	6	5	6	6	C	3	315
5	(Japan) Honda	8	7	11	8	10	7	6	10	8	6	4	9	8	12	5	7	9	10	13	10	8	6	7	6	7	3	4	5	C	3	5	5	8	10	10	10	7	C	10	250
	(Japan) Suzuki																			16	19	Ret																			0
Pos.	Manufacturer	ARA (Spain)			EST (Portugal)			MIS (Italy)			DON (United Kingdom)			ASS (Netherlands)			MOS (Czech Republic)			NAV (Spain)			MAG (France)			BAR (Spain)			JER (Spain)			POR (Portugal)			VIL (Argentina)			MAN (Indonesia)			Pts.
