= 2025 Superbike World Championship =

Motorsport championship

2025 Superbike World Championship
Previous:	2024	Next:	2026
Support series: Supersport World Championship; Supersport 300 World Championship; Women’s Circuit Racing World Championship; Yamaha R3 bLU cRU FIM World Cup

The 2025 Superbike World Championship was the 38th season of the Superbike World Championship. Toprak Razgatlıoğlu, who had previously won the championship in 2024, won his third Superbike world title. Nicolò Bulega finished runner-up in the championship and achieved 20 Superbike victories. Álvaro Bautista finished the championship in third position. Ducati has achieved its 21st constructors' world championship title. Jonathan Rea has declared his retirement at the end of this season. While Toprak Razgatlıoğlu left Superbike at the end of this season as world champion, moving on to MotoGP with Yamaha for 2026. Furthermore, Álvaro Bautista left the official Ducati team at the end of this season. Danilo Petrucci won the Independent Riders Championship for the second time on a Ducati.

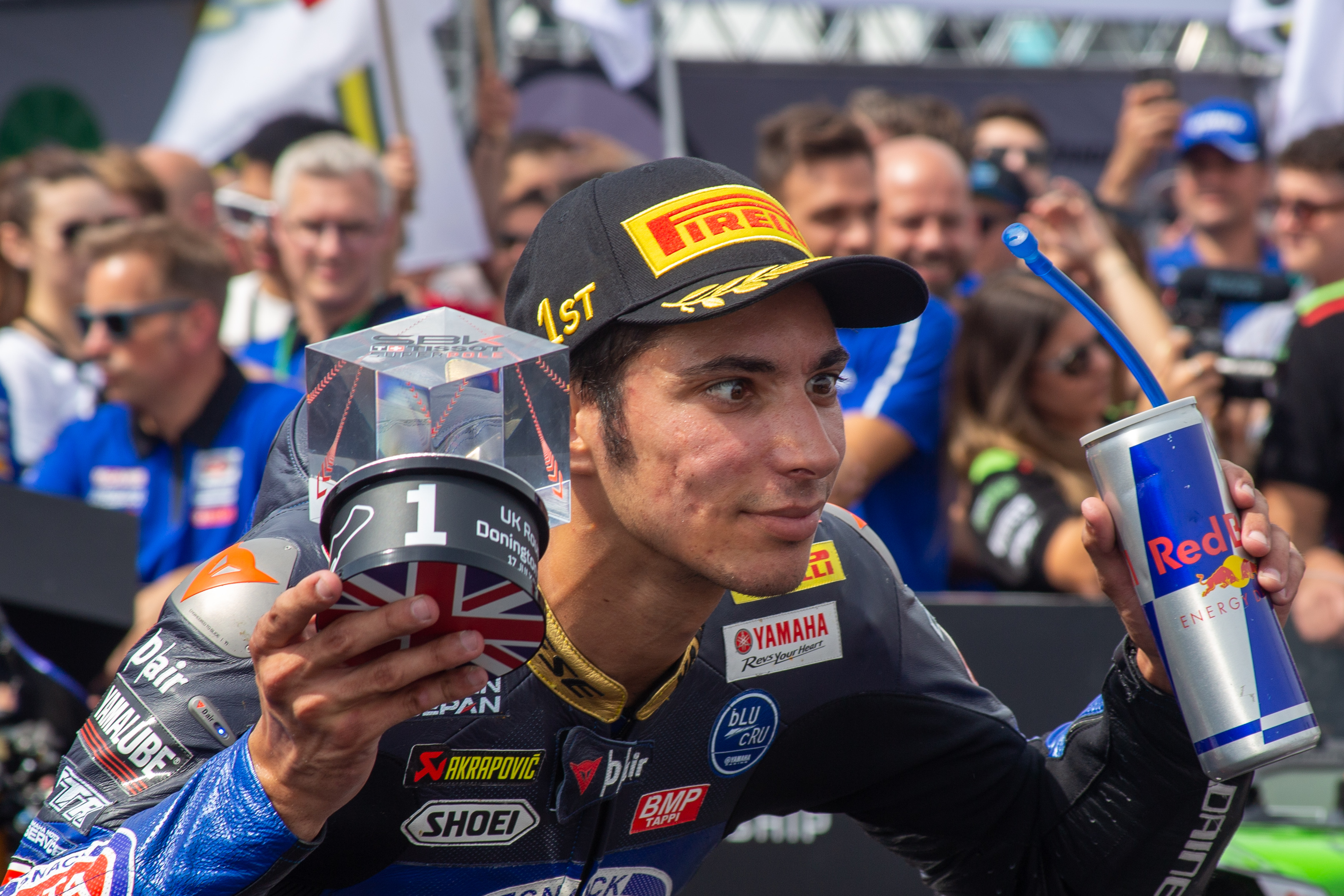
Defending Champion Toprak Razgatlıoğlu (pictured in 2022) won his third Superbike Championship in what is believed to be his final season.

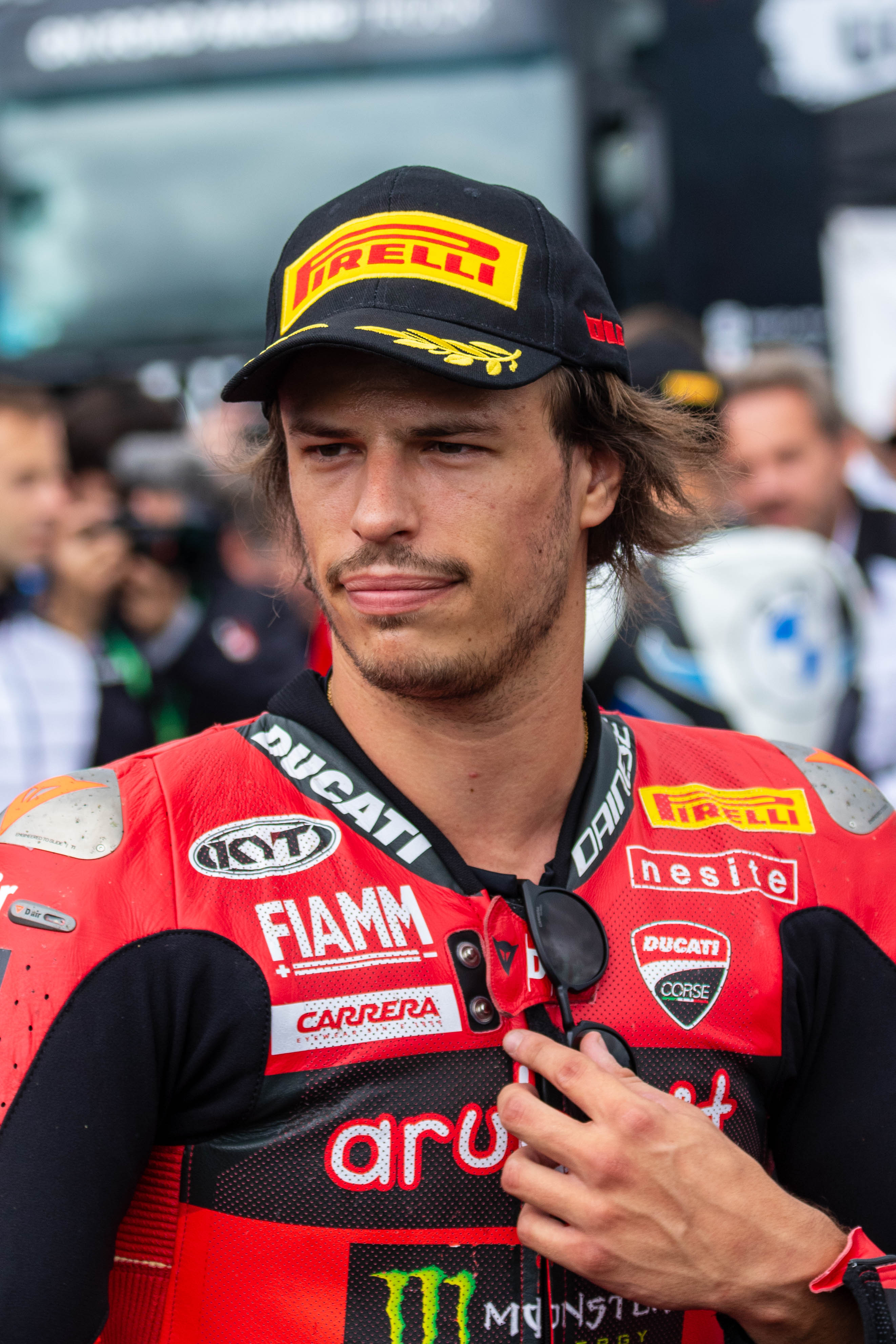
Nicolò Bulega (pictured in 2024) finished second.

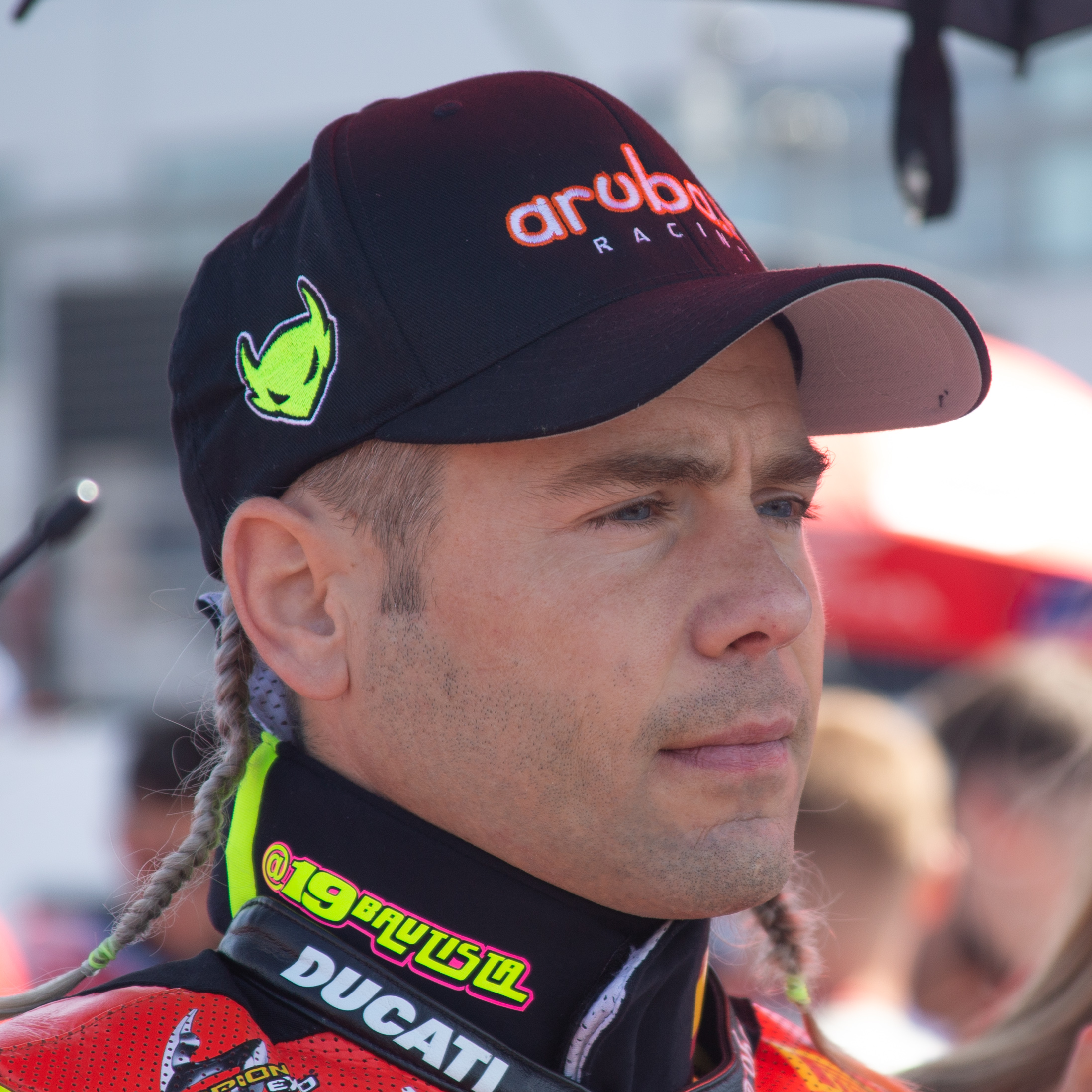
Former Two-Time Superbike Champion Álvaro Bautista (pictured in 2022) finished third.

== Race calendar and results ==
The provisional 2025 season calendar was announced on 11 October 2024.

2025 Superbike World Championship Calendar
Round			Circuit	Date	Pole position	Fastest lap	Winning rider	Winning team	Winning constructor	Ref
1	R1	(Australia) Australian Round	Phillip Island Grand Prix Circuit	22 February	(Italy) Nicolò Bulega	(Italy) Nicolò Bulega	(Italy) Nicolò Bulega	(Italy) Aruba.it Racing - Ducati	(Italy) Ducati	
1	SR	(Australia) Australian Round	Phillip Island Grand Prix Circuit	23 February	(Italy) Nicolò Bulega	(Italy) Nicolò Bulega	(Italy) Nicolò Bulega	(Italy) Aruba.it Racing - Ducati	(Italy) Ducati	
1	R2	(Australia) Australian Round	Phillip Island Grand Prix Circuit	23 February		(Spain) Álvaro Bautista	(Italy) Nicolò Bulega	(Italy) Aruba.it Racing - Ducati	(Italy) Ducati	
2	R1	(Portugal) Portuguese Round	Algarve International Circuit	29 March	(Turkey) Toprak Razgatlıoğlu	(Turkey) Toprak Razgatlıoğlu	(Turkey) Toprak Razgatlıoğlu	(Germany) ROKiT BMW Motorrad WorldSBK Team	(Germany) BMW	
2	SR	(Portugal) Portuguese Round	Algarve International Circuit	30 March	(Turkey) Toprak Razgatlıoğlu	(Turkey) Toprak Razgatlıoğlu	(Turkey) Toprak Razgatlıoğlu	(Germany) ROKiT BMW Motorrad WorldSBK Team	(Germany) BMW	
2	R2	(Portugal) Portuguese Round	Algarve International Circuit	30 March		(Turkey) Toprak Razgatlıoğlu	(Turkey) Toprak Razgatlıoğlu	(Germany) ROKiT BMW Motorrad WorldSBK Team	(Germany) BMW	
3	R1	(Netherlands) Dutch Round	TT Circuit Assen	12 April	(United Kingdom) Sam Lowes	(Italy) Nicolò Bulega	(Italy) Nicolò Bulega	(Italy) Aruba.it Racing - Ducati	(Italy) Ducati	
3	SR	(Netherlands) Dutch Round	TT Circuit Assen	13 April	(United Kingdom) Sam Lowes	(Switzerland) Dominique Aegerter	(Turkey) Toprak Razgatlıoğlu	(Germany) ROKiT BMW Motorrad WorldSBK Team	(Germany) BMW	
3	R2	(Netherlands) Dutch Round	TT Circuit Assen	13 April		(Italy) Nicolò Bulega	(Italy) Andrea Locatelli	(Japan) PATA Maxus Yamaha	(Japan) Yamaha	
4	R1	(Italy) Italian Round	Cremona Circuit	3 May	(Italy) Nicolò Bulega	(Turkey) Toprak Razgatlıoğlu	(Italy) Nicolò Bulega	(Italy) Aruba.it Racing - Ducati	(Italy) Ducati	
4	SR	(Italy) Italian Round	Cremona Circuit	4 May	(Italy) Nicolò Bulega	(Italy) Nicolò Bulega	(Italy) Nicolò Bulega	(Italy) Aruba.it Racing - Ducati	(Italy) Ducati	
4	R2	(Italy) Italian Round	Cremona Circuit	4 May		(Italy) Nicolò Bulega	(Italy) Nicolò Bulega	(Italy) Aruba.it Racing - Ducati	(Italy) Ducati	
5	R1	(Czech Republic) Czech Round	Autodrom Most	17 May	(Turkey) Toprak Razgatlıoğlu	(Turkey) Toprak Razgatlıoğlu	(Turkey) Toprak Razgatlıoğlu	(Germany) ROKiT BMW Motorrad WorldSBK Team	(Germany) BMW	
5	SR	(Czech Republic) Czech Round	Autodrom Most	18 May	(Turkey) Toprak Razgatlıoğlu	(Turkey) Toprak Razgatlıoğlu	(Turkey) Toprak Razgatlıoğlu	(Germany) ROKiT BMW Motorrad WorldSBK Team	(Germany) BMW	
5	R2	(Czech Republic) Czech Round	Autodrom Most	18 May		(Turkey) Toprak Razgatlıoğlu	(Italy) Nicolò Bulega	(Italy) Aruba.it Racing - Ducati	(Italy) Ducati	
6	R1	Emilia-Romagna Round	Misano World Circuit Marco Simoncelli	14 June	(Italy) Nicolò Bulega (Note: Drop 3 positions for race 1 due to irresponsible riding during superpole.)	(Turkey) Toprak Razgatlıoğlu	(Turkey) Toprak Razgatlıoğlu	(Germany) ROKiT BMW Motorrad WorldSBK Team	(Germany) BMW	
6	SR	Emilia-Romagna Round	Misano World Circuit Marco Simoncelli	15 June	(Italy) Nicolò Bulega	(Turkey) Toprak Razgatlıoğlu	(Turkey) Toprak Razgatlıoğlu	(Germany) ROKiT BMW Motorrad WorldSBK Team	(Germany) BMW	
6	R2	Emilia-Romagna Round	Misano World Circuit Marco Simoncelli	15 June		(Turkey) Toprak Razgatlıoğlu	(Turkey) Toprak Razgatlıoğlu	(Germany) ROKiT BMW Motorrad WorldSBK Team	(Germany) BMW	
7	R1	(United Kingdom) UK Round	Donington Park	12 July	(Turkey) Toprak Razgatlıoğlu	(Turkey) Toprak Razgatlıoğlu	(Turkey) Toprak Razgatlıoğlu	(Germany) ROKiT BMW Motorrad WorldSBK Team	(Germany) BMW	
7	SR	(United Kingdom) UK Round	Donington Park	13 July	(Turkey) Toprak Razgatlıoğlu	(Turkey) Toprak Razgatlıoğlu	(Turkey) Toprak Razgatlıoğlu	(Germany) ROKiT BMW Motorrad WorldSBK Team	(Germany) BMW	
7	R2	(United Kingdom) UK Round	Donington Park	13 July		(Italy) Nicolò Bulega	(Turkey) Toprak Razgatlıoğlu	(Germany) ROKiT BMW Motorrad WorldSBK Team	(Germany) BMW	
8	R1	(Hungary) Hungarian Round	Balaton Park Circuit	26 July	(Turkey) Toprak Razgatlıoğlu	(Turkey) Toprak Razgatlıoğlu	(Turkey) Toprak Razgatlıoğlu	(Germany) ROKiT BMW Motorrad WorldSBK Team	(Germany) BMW	
8	SR	(Hungary) Hungarian Round	Balaton Park Circuit	27 July	(Turkey) Toprak Razgatlıoğlu	(Turkey) Toprak Razgatlıoğlu	(Turkey) Toprak Razgatlıoğlu	(Germany) ROKiT BMW Motorrad WorldSBK Team	(Germany) BMW	
8	R2	(Hungary) Hungarian Round	Balaton Park Circuit	27 July		(Turkey) Toprak Razgatlıoğlu	(Turkey) Toprak Razgatlıoğlu	(Germany) ROkiT BMW Motorrad WorldSBK Team	(Germany) BMW	
9	R1	(France) French Round	Circuit de Nevers Magny-Cours	6 September	(Turkey) Toprak Razgatlıoğlu	(Turkey) Toprak Razgatlıoğlu	(Turkey) Toprak Razgatlıoğlu	(Germany) ROkiT BMW Motorrad WorldSBK Team	(Germany) BMW	
9	SR	(France) French Round	Circuit de Nevers Magny-Cours	7 September	(Turkey) Toprak Razgatlıoğlu	(Turkey) Toprak Razgatlıoğlu	(Turkey) Toprak Razgatlıoğlu	(Germany) ROkiT BMW Motorrad WorldSBK Team	(Germany) BMW	
9	R2	(France) French Round	Circuit de Nevers Magny-Cours	7 September		(Turkey) Toprak Razgatlıoğlu	(Turkey) Toprak Razgatlıoğlu	(Germany) ROkiT BMW Motorrad WorldSBK Team	(Germany) BMW	
10	R1	(Aragon) Aragón Round	MotorLand Aragón	27 September	(Italy) Nicolò Bulega	(Italy) Nicolò Bulega	(Turkey) Toprak Razgatlıoğlu	(Germany) ROkiT BMW Motorrad WorldSBK Team	(Germany) BMW	
10	SR	(Aragon) Aragón Round	MotorLand Aragón	28 September	(Italy) Nicolò Bulega	(Italy) Nicolò Bulega	(Italy) Nicolò Bulega	(Italy) Aruba.it Racing - Ducati	(Italy) Ducati	
10	R2	(Aragon) Aragón Round	MotorLand Aragón	28 September		(Turkey) Toprak Razgatlıoğlu	(Italy) Nicolò Bulega	(Italy) Aruba.it Racing - Ducati	(Italy) Ducati	
11	R1	(Portugal) Estoril Round	Circuito do Estoril	11 October	(Turkey) Toprak Razgatlıoğlu	(Turkey) Toprak Razgatlıoğlu	(Turkey) Toprak Razgatlıoğlu	(Germany) ROKiT BMW Motorrad WorldSBK Team	(Germany) BMW	
11	SR	(Portugal) Estoril Round	Circuito do Estoril	12 October	(Turkey) Toprak Razgatlıoğlu	(Italy) Nicolò Bulega	(Turkey) Toprak Razgatlıoğlu	(Germany) ROKiT BMW Motorrad WorldSBK Team	(Germany) BMW	
11	R2	(Portugal) Estoril Round	Circuito do Estoril	12 October		(Italy) Nicolò Bulega	(Italy) Nicolò Bulega	(Italy) Aruba.it Racing - Ducati	(Italy) Ducati	
12	R1	(Spain) Spanish Round	Circuito de Jerez	18 October	(Italy) Nicolò Bulega	(Italy) Nicolò Bulega	(Italy) Nicolò Bulega	(Italy) Aruba.it Racing - Ducati	(Italy) Ducati	
12	SR	(Spain) Spanish Round	Circuito de Jerez	19 October	(Italy) Nicolò Bulega	(Italy) Nicolò Bulega	(Italy) Nicolò Bulega	(Italy) Aruba.it Racing - Ducati	(Italy) Ducati	
12	R2	(Spain) Spanish Round	Circuito de Jerez	19 October		(Italy) Nicolò Bulega	(Italy) Nicolò Bulega	(Italy) Aruba.it Racing - Ducati	(Italy) Ducati	

== Entry list ==
2025 entry list
Team	Constructor	Motorcycle	No.	Rider	Rounds
(Italy) Bimota by Kawasaki Racing Team	Bimota	KB998	22	(United Kingdom) Alex Lowes	All
(Italy) Bimota by Kawasaki Racing Team	Bimota	KB998	47	(Italy) Axel Bassani	All
(Germany) ROKiT BMW Motorrad WorldSBK Team	BMW	M1000RR	1	(Turkey) Toprak Razgatlıoğlu	All
(Germany) ROKiT BMW Motorrad WorldSBK Team	BMW	M1000RR	60	(Netherlands) Michael van der Mark	All
(Italy) Aruba.it Racing - Ducati	Ducati	Panigale V4 R	11	(Italy) Nicolò Bulega	All
(Italy) Aruba.it Racing - Ducati	Ducati	Panigale V4 R	19	(Spain) Álvaro Bautista	All
(Italy) Barni Spark Racing Team	Ducati	Panigale V4 R	5	(Italy) Yari Montella	All
(Italy) Barni Spark Racing Team	Ducati	Panigale V4 R	9	(Italy) Danilo Petrucci	1–11
(Italy) Barni Spark Racing Team	Ducati	Panigale V4 R	24	(Italy) Nicholas Spinelli	12
(Italy) Bmax	Ducati	Panigale V4 R	16	(Italy) Gabriele Ruiu	4
(Belgium) Elf Marc VDS Racing Team	Ducati	Panigale V4 R	14	(United Kingdom) Sam Lowes	All
(Germany) MGM Bonovo Racing	Ducati	Panigale V4 R	45	(United Kingdom) Scott Redding	1–7
(Germany) MGM Bonovo Racing	Ducati	Panigale V4 R	95	(United Kingdom) Tarran Mackenzie	8–12
(Italy) Motocorsa Racing	Ducati	Panigale V4 R	17	(United Kingdom) Ryan Vickers	All
(Italy) Team PATA GoEleven	Ducati	Panigale V4 R	29	(Italy) Andrea Iannone	All
(Germany) Team Triple M Ducati Frankfurt	Ducati	Panigale V4 R	33	(Germany) Lukas Tulovic	12
(Japan) Honda HRC	Honda	CBR1000RR-R	7	(Spain) Iker Lecuona	1–8, 11–12
(Japan) Honda HRC	Honda	CBR1000RR-R	10	(Spain) Sergio García	9
(Japan) Honda HRC	Honda	CBR1000RR-R	46	(United Kingdom) Tommy Bridewell	10
(Japan) Honda HRC	Honda	CBR1000RR-R	49	(Japan) Tetsuta Nagashima	1, 11
(Japan) Honda HRC	Honda	CBR1000RR-R	97	(Spain) Xavi Vierge	All
(United Kingdom) Honda Racing UK	Honda	CBR1000RR-R	46	(United Kingdom) Tommy Bridewell	7
(Japan) Petronas MIE Racing Honda Team	Honda	CBR1000RR-R	21	(Malaysia) Zaqhwan Zaidi	1–6, 8–10, 12
(Japan) Petronas MIE Racing Honda Team	Honda	CBR1000RR-R	75	(Portugal) Ivo Lopes	7, 11
(Japan) Petronas MIE Racing Honda Team	Honda	CBR1000RR-R	95	(United Kingdom) Tarran Mackenzie	1–6
(Japan) Petronas MIE Racing Honda Team	Honda	CBR1000RR-R	53	(Spain) Tito Rabat	7
(Japan) Petronas MIE Racing Honda Team	Honda	CBR1000RR-R	53	(Spain) Tito Rabat	8–12
(Italy) Kawasaki WorldSBK Team	Kawasaki	Ninja ZX-10RR	31	(United States) Garrett Gerloff	All
(United States) Attack Performance Yamaha Racing	Yamaha	YZF-R1	50	(United States) Bobby Fong	11–12
(Italy) GYTR GRT Yamaha WorldSBK Team	Yamaha	YZF-R1	52	(Italy) Alessandro Delbianco	12
(Italy) GYTR GRT Yamaha WorldSBK Team	Yamaha	YZF-R1	77	(Switzerland) Dominique Aegerter	1–10
(Italy) GYTR GRT Yamaha WorldSBK Team	Yamaha	YZF-R1	87	(Australia) Remy Gardner	All
(Japan) PATA Maxus Yamaha	Yamaha	YZF-R1	20	(Australia) Jason O'Halloran	2–3
(Japan) PATA Maxus Yamaha	Yamaha	YZF-R1	55	(Italy) Andrea Locatelli	All
(Japan) PATA Maxus Yamaha	Yamaha	YZF-R1	65	(United Kingdom) Jonathan Rea	4–12
(Italy) Yamaha Motoxracing WorldSBK Team	Yamaha	YZF-R1	12	(Italy) Michael Ruben Rinaldi	6–12
(Italy) Yamaha Motoxracing WorldSBK Team	Yamaha	YZF-R1	53	(Spain) Tito Rabat	1–5
(Italy) Yamaha Motoxracing WorldSBK Team	Yamaha	YZF-R1	99	(Turkey) Bahattin Sofuoğlu	All

Key
Regular rider
Wildcard rider
Replacement rider

== Championship standings ==
Points were awarded as follows:

Race 1 and Race 2

Position	**1st**	**2nd**	**3rd**	**4th**	**5th**	**6th**	**7th**	**8th**	**9th**	**10th**	**11th**	**12th**	**13th**	**14th**	**15th**
Points	25	20	16	13	11	10	9	8	7	6	5	4	3	2	1

Superpole Race

Position	**1st**	**2nd**	**3rd**	**4th**	**5th**	**6th**	**7th**	**8th**	**9th**
Points	12	9	7	6	5	4	3	2	1

=== Riders' championship ===
Pos.	Rider	Bike	PHI (Australia)			POR (Portugal)			ASS (Netherlands)			CRE (Italy)			MOS (Czech Republic)			MIS (Emilia-Romagna)			DON (United Kingdom)			BAL (Hungary)			MAG (France)			ARA (Spain)			EST (Portugal)			JER (Spain)			Pts.
Pos.	Rider	Bike	R1	SR	R2	R1	SR	R2	R1	SR	R2	R1	SR	R2	R1	SR	R2	R1	SR	R2	R1	SR	R2	R1	SR	R2	R1	SR	R2	R1	SR	R2	R1	SR	R2	R1	SR	R2	Pts.
1	(Turkey) Toprak Razgatlıoğlu	BMW	2	13	Ret	**1**	**1**	1	4	1	8	2	2	2	**1**	**1**	2	1	1	1	**1**	**1**	1	**1**	**1**	1	**1**	**1**	1	1	2	2	**1**	**1**	2	2	Ret	3	616
2	(Italy) Nicolò Bulega	Ducati	**1**	**1**	1	2	2	2	1	Ret	Ret	**1**	**1**	1	2	2	1	**2**	**Ret**	2	2	2	2	2	13	2	2	2	2	**2**	**1**	1	2	2	1	**1**	**1**	1	603
3	(Spain) Álvaro Bautista	Ducati	3	19	2	Ret	3	3	Ret	3	2	3	3	3	5	5	Ret	6	5	3	Ret	4	3	3	3	Ret	16	Ret	4	Ret	3	3	3	3	3	3	2	2	337
4	(Italy) Andrea Locatelli	Yamaha	7	6	7	3	5	4	2	4	1	18	7	8	Ret	9	9	5	3	4	4	5	4	4	4	5	5	12	9	7	12	7	4	4	5	7	6	4	310
5	(Italy) Danilo Petrucci	Ducati	4	3	5	4	4	6	3	13	11	7	6	4	3	3	3	3	4	5	3	7	5	5	10	4	4	4	8	4	7	8	WD	WD	WD				284
6	(United Kingdom) Alex Lowes	Bimota	8	7	8	Ret	13	Ret	11	11	6	11	12	11	4	7	15	4	2	14	Ret	DNS	DNS	6	12	6	3	3	3	5	6	6	5	15	4	6	5	6	218
7	(Spain) Xavi Vierge	Honda	11	11	11	5	8	Ret	6	Ret	12	5	5	7	9	8	Ret	11	10	9	11	13	14	8	5	7	NC	9	7	9	10	10	7	7	6	5	4	5	185
8	(United Kingdom) Sam Lowes	Ducati	10	5	6	Ret	6	11	**Ret**	**2**	4	12	4	5	6	4	4	7	6	7	Ret	3	Ret	Ret	2	3	9	Ret	Ret	3	5	19	WD	WD	WD	DNS	DNS	DNS	184
9	(Italy) Andrea Iannone	Ducati	6	2	3	7	12	Ret	Ret	Ret	9	4	8	14	WD	WD	WD	Ret	17	Ret	10	9	7	13	DNS	DNS	Ret	6	16	6	4	4	8	5	12	4	3	7	166
10	(Italy) Axel Bassani	Bimota	9	9	10	9	11	7	Ret	12	5	9	18	15	12	18	6	Ret	Ret	12	16	14	16	10	6	9	7	8	12	8	11	9	11	8	8	11	10	10	140
11	(Australia) Remy Gardner	Yamaha	Ret	10	Ret	10	10	Ret	8	7	3	6	10	10	Ret	15	5	Ret	8	Ret	9	12	9	DNS	DNS	DNS	6	11	13	Ret	16	12	9	6	7	8	Ret	11	126
12	(Netherlands) Michael van der Mark	BMW	Ret	14	14	6	7	5	9	5	17	8	9	9	Ret	13	14	Ret	12	10	13	Ret	Ret	11	15	16	Ret	5	5	10	9	Ret	15	9	10	10	9	13	111
13	(Spain) Iker Lecuona	Honda	DNS	DNS	DNS	11	9	8	5	14	7	Ret	Ret	6	7	6	7	9	9	6	Ret	Ret	10	DNS	DNS	DNS							Ret	10	Ret	12	8	9	103
14	(Switzerland) Dominique Aegerter	Yamaha	12	12	12	8	14	9	7	17	10	13	13	19	13	19	11	Ret	DNS	DNS	7	10	8	12	11	8	8	10	10	11	20	13							100
15	(United States) Garrett Gerloff	Kawasaki	Ret	Ret	13	12	16	12	13	16	16	15	15	12	11	12	10	14	11	8	8	8	6	9	DNS	DNS	Ret	14	11	15	15	14	10	12	11	14	17	Ret	88
16	(United Kingdom) Jonathan Rea	Yamaha										19	16	18	10	10	13	12	7	Ret	5	6	15	Ret	9	12	Ret	7	6	13	8	5	6	Ret	9	Ret	Ret	DNS	83
17	(United Kingdom) Scott Redding	Ducati	5	4	4	Ret	15	15	10	6	19	10	11	13	14	14	12	10	13	16	6	Ret	12																76
18	(Italy) Yari Montella	Ducati	Ret	8	9	Ret	17	10	Ret	8	13	14	14	16	8	11	8	8	Ret	Ret	Ret	15	13	7	Ret	10	Ret	Ret	Ret	12	Ret	16	Ret	19	15	13	11	14	74
19	(United Kingdom) Tarran Mackenzie	Honda	16	18	Ret	14	Ret	17	12	9	14	Ret	Ret	Ret	DNS	21	Ret	16	Ret	DNS																			45
19	(United Kingdom) Tarran Mackenzie	Ducati																						14	8	11	Ret	13	14	Ret	13	11	14	13	Ret	9	7	8	45
20	(United Kingdom) Ryan Vickers	Ducati	13	15	15	16	19	14	15	10	18	16	17	Ret	16	17	16	13	14	11	12	11	11	DNS	7	Ret	13	Ret	Ret	14	14	15	12	11	13	15	12	12	45
21	(Turkey) Bahattin Sofuoğlu	Yamaha	15	17	16	13	Ret	13	Ret	18	15	17	19	17	15	16	17	Ret	15	13	15	16	17	15	14	13	10	15	17	16	17	Ret	Ret	14	14	16	13	15	26
22	(Italy) Michael Ruben Rinaldi	Yamaha																15	16	15	14	17	18	16	16	14	12	17	Ret	18	Ret	20	DNS	Ret	Ret	20	20	20	10
23	(Spain) Tito Rabat	Yamaha	Ret	16	17	15	18	Ret	14	Ret	20	Ret	20	Ret	17	20	Ret																						9
23	(Spain) Tito Rabat	Honda																			Ret	19	19	17	Ret	15	14	18	Ret	17	Ret	17	13	20	16	18	18	16	9
24	(Spain) Sergio García	Honda																									11	16	15										6
25	(Japan) Tetsuta Nagashima	Honda	14	Ret	18																												16	16	17				2
26	(Malaysia) Zaqhwan Zaidi	Honda	DNQ	DNQ	DNQ	Ret	21	16	17	19	22	20	22	20	Ret	22	Ret	17	18	17				18	17	17	15	19	18	20	19	Ret				22	21	21	1
27	(Italy) Alessandro Delbianco	Yamaha																																		Ret	14	17	0
28	(Australia) Jason O'Halloran	Yamaha				17	20	Ret	16	15	21																												0
29	(Italy) Nicholas Spinelli	Ducati																																		19	15	18	0
30	(Germany) Lukas Tulovic	Ducati																																		17	16	Ret	0
31	(United States) Bobby Fong	Yamaha																															17	18	18	21	19	19	0
32	(Portugal) Ivo Lopes	Honda																			Ret	20	20										18	17	Ret				0
33	(United Kingdom) Tommy Bridewell	Honda																			Ret	18	Ret							19	18	18							0
34	(Italy) Gabriele Ruiu	Ducati										Ret	21	Ret																									0
Pos.	Rider	Bike	PHI (Australia)			POR (Portugal)			ASS (Netherlands)			CRE (Italy)			MOS (Czech Republic)			MIS (Emilia-Romagna)			DON (United Kingdom)			BAL (Hungary)			MAG (France)			ARA (Spain)			EST (Portugal)			JER (Spain)			Pts.

Colour	Result
Gold	Winner
Silver	Second place
Bronze	Third place
Green	Points classification
Blue	Non-points classification
Blue	Non-classified finish (NC)
Purple	Retired, not classified (Ret)
Red	Did not qualify (DNQ)
Red	Did not pre-qualify (DNPQ)
Black	Disqualified (DSQ)
White	Did not start (DNS)
White	Withdrew (WD)
White	Race cancelled (C)
Blank	Did not practice (DNP)
Blank	Did not arrive (DNA)
Blank	Excluded (EX)

**Bold** – Pole position
Italics – Fastest lap

=== Teams' championship ===
Pos.	Team	Bike No.	PHI (Australia)			POR (Portugal)			ASS (Netherlands)			CRE (Italy)			MOS (Czech Republic)			MIS (Emilia-Romagna)			DON (United Kingdom)			BAL (Hungary)			MAG (France)			ARA (Spain)			EST (Portugal)			JER (Spain)			Pts.
Pos.	Team	Bike No.	R1	SR	R2	R1	SR	R2	R1	SR	R2	R1	SR	R2	R1	SR	R2	R1	SR	R2	R1	SR	R2	R1	SR	R2	R1	SR	R2	R1	SR	R2	R1	SR	R2	R1	SR	R2	Pts.
1	(Italy) Aruba.it Racing - Ducati	11	**1**	**1**	1	2	2	2	1	Ret	Ret	**1**	**1**	1	2	2	1	2	**Ret**	2	2	2	2	2	13	2	2	2	2	**2**	**1**	**1**	2	2	1	**1**	**1**	**1**	940
1	(Italy) Aruba.it Racing - Ducati	19	3	19	2	Ret	3	3	Ret	3	2	3	3	3	5	5	Ret	6	5	3	Ret	4	3	3	3	Ret	16	Ret	4	Ret	3	3	3	3	3	3	2	2	940
2	(Germany) ROKiT BMW Motorrad WorldSBK Team	1	2	13	Ret	**1**	**1**	1	4	1	8	2	2	2	**1**	**1**	2	**1**	1	1	**1**	**1**	**1**	**1**	**1**	**1**	**1**	**1**	**1**	1	2	2	**1**	**1**	2	2	Ret	3	727
2	(Germany) ROKiT BMW Motorrad WorldSBK Team	60	Ret	14	14	6	7	5	9	5	17	8	9	9	Ret	13	14	Ret	12	10	13	Ret	Ret	11	15	16	Ret	5	5	10	9	Ret	15	9	10	10	9	13	727
3	(Japan) PATA Maxus Yamaha	20				17	20	Ret	16	15	21																												393
3	(Japan) PATA Maxus Yamaha	55	7	6	7	3	5	4	2	4	1	18	7	8	Ret	9	9	5	3	4	4	5	4	4	4	5	5	12	9	7	12	7	4	4	5	7	6	4	393
3	(Japan) PATA Maxus Yamaha	65										19	16	18	10	10	13	12	7	Ret	5	6	15	Ret	9	12	Ret	7	6	13	8	5	6	Ret	9	Ret	Ret	DNS	393
4	(Italy) Barni Spark Racing Team	5	Ret	8	9	Ret	17	10	Ret	8	13	14	14	16	8	11	8	8	Ret	Ret	Ret	15	13	7	Ret	10	Ret	Ret	Ret	12	Ret	16	Ret	19	15	13	11	14	358
4	(Italy) Barni Spark Racing Team	9	4	3	5	4	4	6	3	13	11	7	6	4	3	3	3	3	4	5	3	7	5	5	10	4	4	4	8	4	7	8	WD	WD	WD				358
4	(Italy) Barni Spark Racing Team	24																																		19	15	18	358
5	(Italy) Bimota by Kawasaki Racing Team	22	8	7	8	Ret	13	Ret	11	11	6	11	12	11	4	7	15	4	2	14	Ret	DNS	DNS	6	12	6	3	3	3	5	6	6	5	15	4	6	5	6	358
5	(Italy) Bimota by Kawasaki Racing Team	47	9	9	10	9	11	7	Ret	12	5	9	18	15	12	18	6	Ret	Ret	12	16	14	16	10	6	9	7	8	12	8	11	9	11	8	8	11	10	10	358
6	(Japan) Team HRC	7	DNS	DNS	DNS	11	9	8	5	14	7	Ret	Ret	6	7	6	7	9	9	6	Ret	Ret	10	DNS	DNS	DNS							Ret	10	Ret	11	8	9	296
6	(Japan) Team HRC	10																									11	16	15										296
6	(Japan) Team HRC	46																												19	18	18							296
6	(Japan) Team HRC	49	14	Ret	18																												16	16	17				296
6	(Japan) Team HRC	97	11	11	11	5	8	Ret	6	Ret	12	5	5	7	9	8	Ret	11	10	9	11	13	14	8	5	7	17	9	7	9	10	10	7	7	6	5	4	5	296
7	(Italy) GYTR GRT Yamaha WorldSBK Team	52																																		Ret	14	17	226
7	(Italy) GYTR GRT Yamaha WorldSBK Team	77	12	12	12	8	14	9	7	17	10	13	13	19	13	19	11	Ret	DNS	DNS	7	10	8	12	11	8	8	10	10	11	20	13							226
7	(Italy) GYTR GRT Yamaha WorldSBK Team	87	Ret	10	Ret	10	10	Ret	8	7	3	6	10	10	Ret	15	5	Ret	8	Ret	9	12	9	DNS	DNS	DNS	6	11	13	Ret	16	12	9	6	7	8	Ret	11	226
8	(Belgium) Elf Marc VDS Racing Team	14	10	5	6	Ret	6	11	**Ret**	**2**	4	12	4	5	6	4	4	7	6	7	Ret	3	Ret	Ret	2	3	9	Ret	Ret	3	5	19	WD	WD	WD	DNS	DNS	DNS	184
9	(Italy) Team PATA GoEleven	29	6	2	3	7	17	Ret	Ret	Ret	9	4	8	14	WD	WD	WD	Ret	17	Ret	10	9	7	13	DNS	DNS	Ret	6	16	6	4	4	8	5	12	4	3	7	166
10	(Germany) MGM Bonovo Racing	45	5	4	4	Ret	15	15	10	6	19	10	11	13	14	14	12	10	13	16	6	Ret	12																112
10	(Germany) MGM Bonovo Racing	95																						14	8	11	Ret	13	14	Ret	13	11	14	13	Ret	9	7	8	112
11	(Italy) Kawasaki WorldSBK Team	31	Ret	Ret	13	12	16	12	13	16	16	15	15	12	11	12	10	14	11	8	8	8	6	9	DNS	DNS	Ret	14	11	15	15	14	10	12	11	14	17	Ret	88
12	(Italy) Motocorsa Racing	17	13	15	15	16	19	14	15	10	18	16	17	Ret	16	17	16	13	14	11	12	11	11	DNS	7	Ret	13	Ret	Ret	14	14	15	12	11	13	15	12	12	45
13	(Italy) Yamaha Motorxracing WorldSBK Team	12																15	16	15	14	17	18	16	16	14	12	17	Ret	18	Ret	20	DNS	Ret	Ret	20	20	20	39
13	(Italy) Yamaha Motorxracing WorldSBK Team	53	Ret	16	17	15	18	Ret	14	Ret	20	Ret	20	Ret	17	20	Ret																						39
13	(Italy) Yamaha Motorxracing WorldSBK Team	99	15	17	16	13	Ret	13	Ret	18	15	17	19	17	15	16	17	Ret	15	13	15	16	17	15	14	13	10	15	17	16	17	Ret	Ret	14	14	16	13	15	39
14	(Japan) PETRONAS MIE Racing Honda Team	21	DNQ	DNQ	DNQ	Ret	21	16	17	19	22	20	22	20	Ret	22	Ret	17	18	17				18	17	18	15	19	18	20	19	Ret				22	21	21	16
14	(Japan) PETRONAS MIE Racing Honda Team	53																			Ret	19	19	17	Ret	15	14	18	Ret	17	Ret	17	13	20	16	18	18	16	16
14	(Japan) PETRONAS MIE Racing Honda Team	75																			Ret	20	20										18	17	Ret				16
14	(Japan) PETRONAS MIE Racing Honda Team	95	16	18	Ret	14	Ret	17	12	9	14	Ret	Ret	Ret	DNS	21	Ret	16	Ret	DNS																			16
	(United States) Attack Performance Yamaha Racing	50																															17	18	18	21	19	19	0
	(Germany) Team Triple M Ducati Frankfurt	33																																		17	16	Ret	0
	(United Kingdom) Honda Racing UK	46																			Ret	18	Ret																0
	(Italy) Bmax	16										Ret	21	Ret																									0
Pos.	Team	Bike No.	PHI (Australia)			POR (Portugal)			ASS (Netherlands)			CRE (Italy)			MOS (Czech Republic)			MIS (Emilia-Romagna)			DON (United Kingdom)			BAL (Hungary)			MAG (France)			ARA (Spain)			EST (Portugal)			JER (Spain)			Pts.

=== Manufacturers' championship ===
Pos.	Manufacturer	PHI (Australia)			POR (Portugal)			ASS (Netherlands)			CRE (Italy)			MOS (Czech Republic)			MIS (Emilia-Romagna)			DON (United Kingdom)			BAL (Hungary)			MAG (France)			ARA (Spain)			EST (Portugal)			JER (Spain)			Pts.
Pos.	Manufacturer	R1	SR	R2	R1	SR	R2	R1	SR	R2	R1	SR	R2	R1	SR	R2	R1	SR	R2	R1	SR	R2	R1	SR	R2	R1	SR	R2	R1	SR	R2	R1	SR	R2	R1	SR	R2	Pts.
1	(Italy) Ducati	1	1	1	2	2	2	1	2	2	1	1	1	2	2	1	2	4	2	2	2	2	2	2	2	2	2	2	2	1	1	2	2	1	1	1	1	647
2	(Germany) BMW	2	13	14	1	1	1	4	1	8	2	2	2	1	1	2	1	1	1	1	1	1	1	1	1	1	1	1	1	2	2	1	1	2	2	9	3	619
3	(Japan) Yamaha	7	6	7	3	5	4	2	4	1	6	7	8	10	9	5	5	3	4	4	5	4	4	4	5	5	7	6	7	8	5	4	4	5	7	6	4	340
4	(Italy) Bimota	8	7	8	9	11	7	11	11	5	9	12	11	4	7	6	4	2	12	16	14	16	6	6	6	3	3	3	5	6	6	5	8	4	6	5	6	254
5	(Japan) Honda	11	11	11	5	8	8	5	9	7	5	5	6	7	6	7	9	9	6	11	13	10	8	5	7	11	9	7	9	10	10	7	7	6	5	4	5	229
6	(Japan) Kawasaki	Ret	Ret	13	12	16	12	13	16	16	15	15	12	11	12	10	14	11	8	8	8	6	9	DNS	DNS	Ret	14	11	15	15	14	10	12	11	14	17	Ret	88
Pos.	Manufacturer	PHI (Australia)			POR (Portugal)			ASS (Netherlands)			CRE (Italy)			MOS (Czech Republic)			MIS (Emilia-Romagna)			DON (United Kingdom)			BAL (Hungary)			MAG (France)			ARA (Spain)			EST (Portugal)			JER (Spain)			Pts.
