= Toprak Razgatlıoğlu =

Turkish motorcycle racer (born 1996)

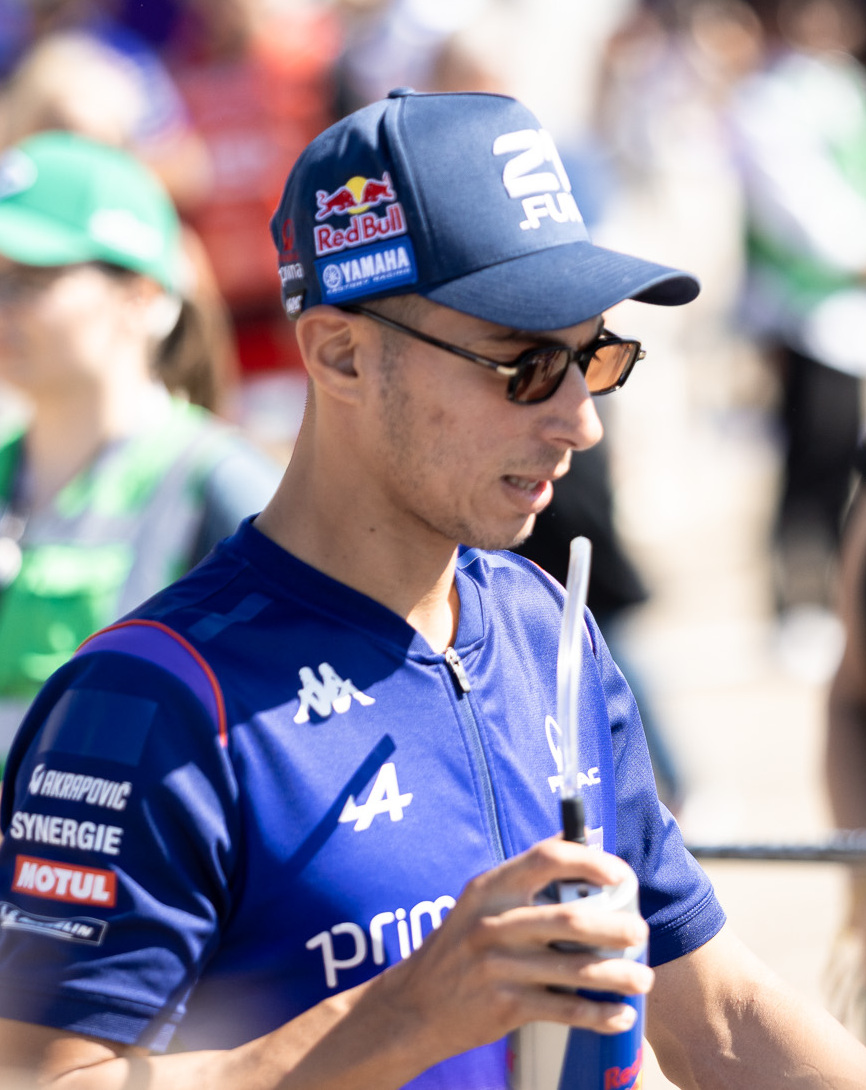
- Razgatlıoğlu at the 2026 German Grand Prix
- Nationality: Turkish
- Born: 16 October 1996 (age 30); Alanya, Turkey
- Current team: Prima Pramac Yamaha MotoGP
- Bike number: 7
Motorcycle racing career statistics
MotoGP World Championship
Active years	2026
Manufacturers	Yamaha
Starts / Wins / Podiums / Poles / F. laps / Points; 17 / 0 / 0 / 0 / 0 / 18
Superbike World Championship
Active years	2018–2025
Manufacturers	Kawasaki (2018–2019); Yamaha (2020–2023); BMW (2024–2025)
Championships	3 (2021, 2024, 2025)
2025 championship position	1st (616 pts)
Starts / Wins / Podiums / Poles / F. laps / Points; 258 / 78 / 173 / 24 / 66 / 3482

Toprak Razgatlıoğlu (Turkish pronunciation: ['topɾak 'ɾazgatɫɯ'oːɫu]; born 16 October 1996) is a Turkish motorcycle road racer who, from 2026, rides for Prima Pramac Yamaha MotoGP in the MotoGP World Championship. Razgatlıoğlu holds three Superbike World Championship titles: 2021 with the Yamaha factory Superbike team, ending Jonathan Rea's six-year reign, 2024 and 2025 with the BMW Motorrad WorldSBK Team, the manufacturer's first two titles. He is the first Turkish Superbike World Champion and the rider with the most wins for both Yamaha and BMW in the championship, with 37 and 39 total victories respectively, after winning his first two with Kawasaki.

Razgatlıoğlu is well known for his 'stoppie' celebration. He is also known for his dominating record, being called a Superbike equivalent to Marc Márquez. He joined Pramac Racing for the 2026 season, the year before the 2027 Regulation change, and became the first MotoGP rider hailing from Turkey. He is the first WSBK rider since Loris Baz to switch to MotoGP and the first WSBK champion since Ben Spies.

== Early life ==
Born in Alanya, Razgatlıoğlu is the second son of the Turkish stunt motorcyclist Arif Razgatlıoğlu, who was known as "Tek Teker Arif" ("Wheelie Arif"). His father, together with his girlfriend who was riding on the pillion seat, died following a motorcycle accident in Antalya on 17 November 2017.

== Career ==
=== Early career ===
Razgatlıoğlu competed in the Red Bull MotoGP Rookies Cup in 2013 and 2014, finishing tenth and sixth overall respectively. He finished first in the seventh race of the 2014 season in Sachsenring, Germany.

Razgatlıoğlu won his debut race in the European Superstock 600 Championship on 5 October 2014 at Magny Cours aboard a Kawasaki ZX-6R.

Razgatlıoğlu won the 2015 European Superstock 600 Championship aboard a Kawasaki ZX-6R.

=== Superbike World Championship ===
Razgatlıoğlu was an upcoming performer with Turkish Puccetti Kawasaki racing team from 2018 and was partnered with factory Kawasaki riders Jonathan Rea and Leon Haslam for the 2019 Suzuka 8 Hours, a track endurance race. Due to not being allowed to ride with the other two taking turns throughout the race, Razgatlıoğlu soon left the Kawasaki marque to become a factory Yamaha rider from 2020. He became World Champion in 2021 after finishing second in Race 1 at the Mandalika International Street Circuit.

Under contract to Yamaha in the Superbike class from 2020 until 30 November 2023, Razgatlıoğlu was prevented by Yamaha from testing his 2024 BMW machine at an official test held immediately after the 2023 season-end race at Jerez in late October/early November, when Jonathan Rea, previously with Kawasaki Racing Team and Razgatlıoğlu's direct replacement, was allowed to participate on his new Yamaha.

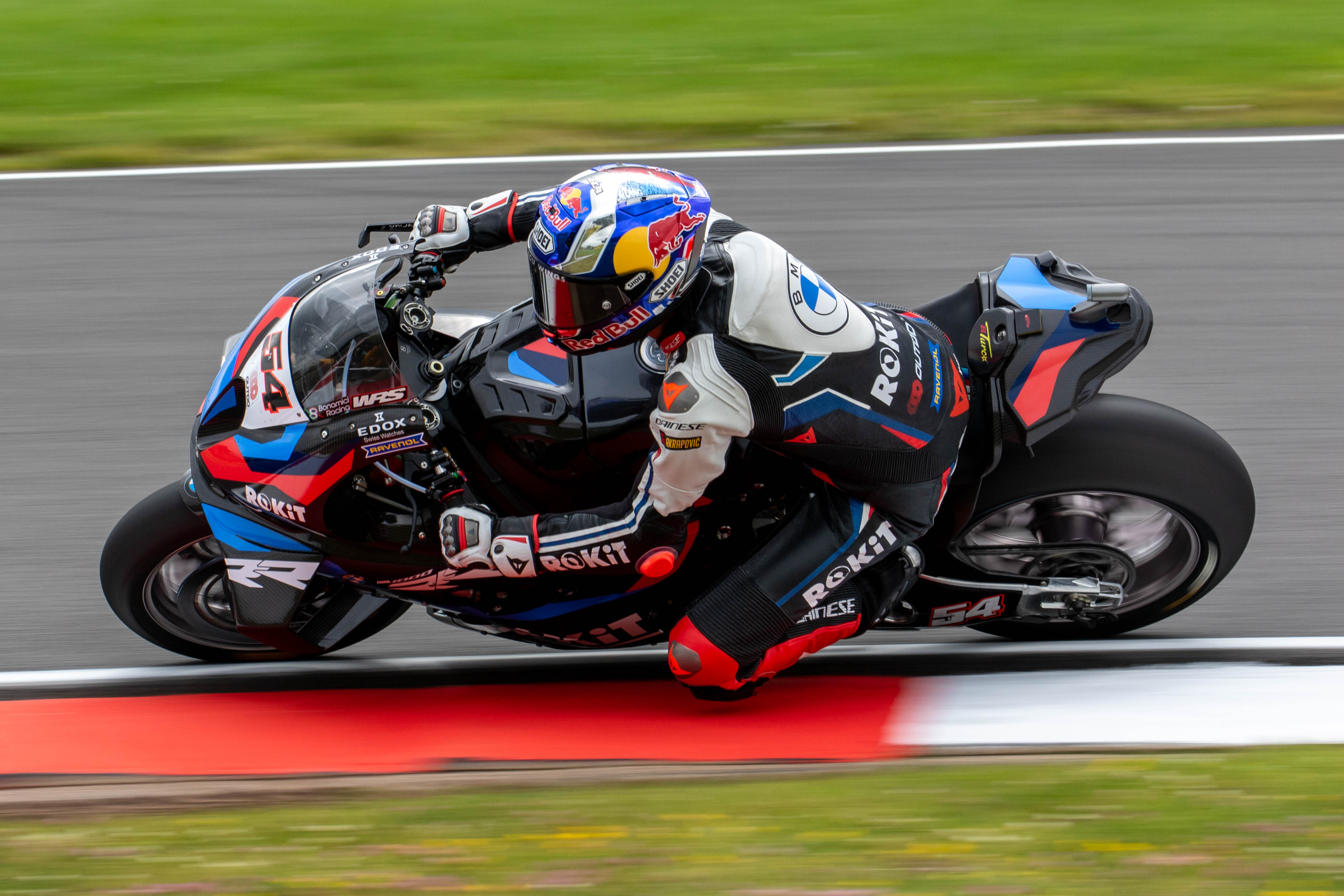
Razgatlıoğlu at Donington Park, 2024

Razgatlıoğlu was offered a test on 22/23 November with gagging conditions attached, but chose to wait until 4 December when out of contract to Yamaha. He rode the BMW over two days at Portimão, followed by another test at Jerez.

==== 2024 ====
BMW signed Razgatlıoğlu in 2024 on a two-year deal. Razgatlıoğlu won his first race at race 1 in Catalunya, the first win for BMW since 2013 and his 40th overall. He would then proceed to win the Superpole race by overtaking Álvaro Bautista at the last corner of the final lap. Razgatlıoğlu scored his first hat trick in Misano; this was followed by further consecutive hat tricks at Donington, Most and Portimão. Razgatlıoğlu crashed heavily during free practice at Magny-Cours and was ultimately diagnosed with pneumothorax; the session was red-flagged as a result. Razgatlioğlu would ultimately be declared unfit to race.

Razgatlıoğlu broke the record for most consecutive wins in a season with 13 following his hat trick in Portimão; he celebrated breaking the record by imitating a viral pose struck by Olympic silver medalist shooter Yusuf Dikeç.

=== MotoGP World Championship ===
==== 2022 ====
In June, Razgatlıoğlu got an opportunity to test a Yamaha YZR-M1 during a one-day MotoGP private test at the Motorland Aragón circuit. Razgatlıoğlu completed forty laps during this test. No empirical data was made available from the test, likely owing to the test's confidentiality and press being locked out of the event. He was accompanied by Yamaha test rider Cal Crutchlow during the test.

==== 2023 ====
Yamaha officially announced that Razgatlıoğlu would ride the Yamaha YZR-M1 during the development tests held at the Jerez circuit in Andalucía, Spain, when he joined Yamaha MotoGP test rider Cal Crutchlow for two days on April 10 and 11. This was the second test on the YZR-M1, following his first ride at Motorland Aragon in June 2022.

==== 2026: Prima Pramac Racing ====
On June 10, 2025, Yamaha announced that Razgatlıoğlu will move from World Superbikes to MotoGP in 2026, riding for the Prima Pramac Racing Team. He became the first Turkish MotoGP rider in history, and will be alongside MotoGP Veteran Jack Miller. After sustaining a shoulder injury in Mandalika, Razgatlıoğlu missed the final five races of the season in order to undergo surgery and recover.

== Personal life ==
Nicknamed El Turco, Razgatlıoğlu is managed by former multiple time WSSP champion Kenan Sofuoğlu. He resides in Sakarya. Toprak's father used to call him Tek Teker Toprak, but he used to get angry by it because he would say ‘I am a racer, not a stunt rider’. Toprak's father had a shop with Atari games and at the back was a straight where he used to do stunts as a kid.

On 10 October 2025, Razgatlıoğlu received his 2021 WorldSBK championship winning bike from Yamaha after signing a MotoGP contract with them.

== Career statistics ==
=== Career summary ===
Season	Series	Motorcycle	Position
2011	IDM Yamaha R6 Cup	Yamaha YZF-R6	18th
2011	Turkish Road Race 600cc Championship	Yamaha YZF-R6	**2nd**
2012	IDM Yamaha R6 Cup	Yamaha YZF-R6	7th
2012	Turkish Road Race 600cc Championship	Yamaha YZF-R6	**1st**
2013	Red Bull MotoGP Rookies Cup	KTM RC250GP	10th
2014	Red Bull MotoGP Rookies Cup	KTM RC250GP	6th
2014	European Superstock 600 Championship	Kawasaki ZX-6R	13th
2015	European Superstock 600 Championship	Kawasaki ZX-6R	**1st**
2016	FIM Superstock 1000 Cup	Kawasaki ZX-10R	5th
2017	European Superstock 1000 Championship	Kawasaki ZX-10R	**2nd**
2018	2018 Superbike World Championship	Kawasaki Ninja ZX-10R	9th
2019	2019 Superbike World Championship	Kawasaki Ninja ZX-10R	5th
2020	2020 Superbike World Championship	Yamaha YZF-R1	4th
2021	2021 Superbike World Championship	Yamaha YZF-R1	**1st**
2022	2022 Superbike World Championship	Yamaha YZF-R1	**2nd**
2023	2023 Superbike World Championship	Yamaha YZF-R1	**2nd**
2024	2024 Superbike World Championship	BMW M1000RR	**1st**
2025	2025 Superbike World Championship	BMW M1000RR	**1st**

=== Red Bull MotoGP Rookies Cup ===
==== Races by year ====
(key) (Races in bold indicate pole position; races in italics indicate fastest lap)

Year	1	2	3	4	5	6	7	8	9	10	11	12	13	14	Pos	Pts
2013	AME1; 3	AME2; 3	JER1; 6	JER2; 5	ASS1; Ret	ASS2; 15	SAC1; 6	SAC2; 12	BRN; 19	SIL1; Ret	SIL2; 8	MIS; 12	ARA1; 10	ARA2; 4	10th	99
2014	JER1; 11	JER1; 8	MUG; 5	ASS1; 12	ASS2; 10	SAC1; 1	SAC2; 3	BRN1; 16	BRN2; 9	SIL1; 9	SIL2; Ret	MIS; 4	ARA1; 6	ARA2; 5	6th	123

=== FIM European Superstock 600 ===
==== Races by year ====
(key) (Races in bold indicate pole position, races in italics indicate fastest lap)

Year	Bike	1	2	3	4	5	6	7	8	Pos	Pts
2014	Kawasaki	SPA	NED	IMO	ITA	POR	SPA	FRA; 1		13th	25
2015	Kawasaki	SPA; 1	SPA; 1	**NED**; 1	**ITA**; 1	POR; 1	ITA; 3	SPA; DNS	FRA; 3	1st	157

=== FIM Superstock 1000 Cup ===
==== Races by year ====
(key) (Races in bold indicate pole position, races in italics indicate fastest lap)

Year	Bike	1	2	3	4	5	6	7	8	Pos	Pts
2016	Kawasaki	SPA; DNS	NED	ITA; 5	GBR; 6	ITA; 4	GER; Ret	FRA; 2	SPA; 3	5th	70

=== European Superstock 1000 Championship ===
==== Races by year ====
(key) (Races in bold indicate pole position) (Races in italics indicate fastest lap)

Year	Bike	1	2	3	4	5	6	7	8	9	Pos	Pts
2017	Kawasaki	SPA; 4	NED; 1	ITA; 3	GBR; 1	ITA; 6	GER; Ret	ALG; 1	FRA; WD	SPA; 3	2nd	130

=== Superbike World Championship ===
==== By season ====
Season	Motorcycle	Team	Race	Win	Podium	Pole	FLap	Pts	Plcd
2018	Kawasaki ZX-10RR	Puccetti Racing – Kawasaki	24	0	2	0	0	151	9th
2019	Kawasaki ZX-10RR	Puccetti Racing – Kawasaki	37	2	13	0	3	315	5th
2020	Yamaha YZF-R1	Pata Yamaha WorldSBK Official Team	22	3	9	1	1	228	4th
2021	Yamaha YZF-R1	Pata Yamaha with Brixx WorldSBK	37	13	29	3	9	564	**1st**
2022	Yamaha YZF-R1	Pata Yamaha with Brixx WorldSBK	36	14	29	4	13	529	**2nd**
2023	Yamaha YZF-R1	Pata Yamaha Prometeon WorldSBK	36	7	33	4	7	552	**2nd**
2024	BMW M1000RR	ROKiT BMW Motorrad WorldSBK Team	30	18	27	6	13	527	**1st**
2025	BMW M1000RR	ROKiT BMW Motorrad WorldSBK Team	36	21	31	6	20	616	**1st**
Total			**258**	**78**	**173**	**24**	**66**	**3482**	

==== Races by year ====
(key) (Races in bold indicate pole position; races in italics indicate fastest lap)

Year	Bike	1		2		3		4		5		6		7		8		9		10		11		12		13		14		Pos	Pts
Year	Bike	R1	R2	R1	R2	R1	R2	R1	R2	R1	R2	R1	R2	R1	R2	R1	R2	R1	R2	R1	R2	R1	R2	R1	R2	R1	R2	R1	R2	Pos	Pts
2016	Kawasaki	AUS; DNS	AUS; DNS	THA	THA	SPA	SPA	NED	NED	ITA	ITA	MAL	MAL	GBR	GBR	ITA	ITA	USA	USA	ITA	ITA	GER	GER	FRA	FRA	SPA	SPA	QAT	QAT	NC	0
2018	Kawasaki	AUS; 13	AUS; 10	THA; 15	THA; 8	SPA; 9	SPA; 9	NED; 10	NED; 9	ITA; 11	ITA; 8	GBR; 21	GBR; 2	CZE; 10	CZE; 9	USA; Ret	USA; DNS	ITA; 11	ITA; 12	POR; 8	POR; Ret	FRA; 8	FRA; 12	ARG; 3	ARG; 7	QAT; 10	QAT; C			9th	151

Year	Bike	1			2			3			4			5			6			7			8			9			10			11			12			13			Pos	Pts
Year	Bike	R1	SR	R2	R1	SR	R2	R1	SR	R2	R1	SR	R2	R1	SR	R2	R1	SR	R2	R1	SR	R2	R1	SR	R2	R1	SR	R2	R1	SR	R2	R1	SR	R2	R1	SR	R2	R1	SR	R2	Pos	Pts
2019	Kawasaki	AUS; 6	AUS; 15	AUS; Ret	THA; 10	THA; 9	THA; 9	SPA; 8	SPA; 10	SPA; Ret	NED; 9	NED; C	NED; 9	ITA; 3	ITA; 7	ITA; C	SPA; 5	SPA; 7	SPA; 3	ITA; Ret	ITA; 4	ITA; 2	GBR; 13	GBR; 2	GBR; 2	USA; 3	USA; 4	USA; 3	POR; 6	POR; 4	POR; 3	FRA; 1	FRA; 1	FRA; Ret	ARG; 3	ARG; 3	ARG; 3	QAT; 11	QAT; Ret	QAT; 5	5th	315
2020	Yamaha	AUS; 1	AUS; 2	AUS; Ret	SPA; 3	SPA; Ret	SPA; 3	POR; 2	POR; 2	POR; 8	SPA; 6	SPA; 7	SPA; 8	SPA; 5	SPA; 7	SPA; 7	SPA; 6	SPA; DNS	SPA; DNS	FRA; 6	FRA; 9	FRA; 9	**POR**; 1	**POR**; 1	POR; 3																4th	228
2021	Yamaha	SPA; 3	SPA; 6	SPA; 6	POR; 2	POR; 2	POR; 3	ITA; 2	ITA; 2	ITA; 1	GBR; 1	GBR; 6	GBR; 1	NED; 3	NED; 3	NED; Ret	CZE; 1	CZE; 1	CZE; 2	SPA; 3	SPA; 3	SPA; 1	FRA; 1	FRA; 2	FRA; 1	SPA; Ret	SPA; 2	SPA; 2	**SPA**; 1	SPA; C	**SPA**; 1	**POR**; 1	**POR**; 6	POR; Ret	ARG; 1	ARG; 1	ARG; 3	**INA**; 2	INA; C	**INA**; 4	1st	564
2022	Yamaha	**SPA**; 3	**SPA**; 3	SPA; 3	**NED**; 3	**NED**; 2	NED; Ret	POR; 2	POR; 2	POR; 3	ITA; Ret	ITA; 1	ITA; 2	GBR; 1	GBR; 1	GBR; 1	CZE; 2	CZE; 1	CZE; 1	FRA; 11	FRA; 1	FRA; 1	SPA; 5	SPA; 4	SPA; 3	POR; 1	POR; 1	POR; 2	**ARG**; 15	**ARG**; 1	ARG; 2	**INA**; 1	**INA**; 1	INA; 1	AUS; 2	AUS; 2	AUS; 4				**2nd**	**529**
2023	Yamaha	**AUS**; 3	**AUS**; 3	AUS; Ret	**INA**; 2	**INA**; 1	INA; 2	NED; 3	NED; 3	NED; 2	SPA; 2	SPA; 2	SPA; 2	ITA; 3	ITA; 2	ITA; 2	GBR; 2	GBR; 1	GBR; 2	**ITA**; 2	**ITA**; 1	ITA; 1	**CZE**; 2	**CZE**; 1	CZE; Ret	FRA; 1	FRA; 1	FRA; 2	SPA; 2	SPA; 3	SPA; 2	POR; 2	POR; 2	POR; 2	SPA; 2	SPA; 4	SPA; 2				**2nd**	**552**
2024	BMW	AUS; 5	AUS; 3	AUS; Ret	**SPA**; 1	**SPA**; 1	SPA; 3	NED; 2	NED; 9	NED; 1	**ITA**; 1	**ITA**; 1	ITA; 1	**GBR**; 1	**GBR**; 1	GBR; 1	**CZE**; 1	**CZE**; 1	CZE; 1	**POR**; 1	**POR**; 1	POR; 1	FRA; WD	FRA; WD	FRA; WD	ITA	ITA	ITA	SPA; 2	SPA; 2	SPA; 2	**POR**; 1	**POR**; 2	POR; 1	SPA; 2	SPA; 2	SPA; 1				1st	527
2025	BMW	AUS; 2	AUS; 13	AUS; Ret	**POR**; 1	**POR**; 1	POR; 1	NED; 4	NED; 1	NED; 8	ITA; 2	ITA; 2	ITA; 2	**CZE**; 1	**CZE**; 1	CZE; 2	ITA; 1	ITA; 1	ITA; 1	**GBR**; 1	**GBR**; 1	GBR; 1	**HUN**; 1	**HUN**; 1	HUN; 1	**FRA**; 1	**FRA**; 1	FRA; 1	SPA; 1	SPA; 2	SPA; 2	**POR**; 1	**POR**; 1	POR; 2	SPA; 2	SPA; Ret	SPA; 3				1st	616

* Season still in progress.

=== Grand Prix motorcycle racing ===
==== By season ====
Season	Class	Motorcycle	Team	Race	Win	Podium	Pole	FLap	Pts	Plcd	WCh
2026	MotoGP	Yamaha	Prima Pramac Yamaha MotoGP	17	0	0	0	0	18	22nd*	–
Total				**17**	**0**	**0**	**0**	**0**	**18**		

==== By class ====
Class	Seasons	1st GP	1st pod	1st win	Race	Win	Podiums	Pole	FLap	Pts	WChmp
MotoGP	2026				17	0	0	0	0	18	0
Total	2026				**17**	**0**	**0**	**0**	**0**	**18**	**0**

==== Races by year ====
(key) (Races in bold indicate pole position; races in italics indicate fastest lap)

Year	Class	Bike	1	2	3	4	5	6	7	8	9	10	11	12	13	14	15	16	17	18	19	20	21	22	Pos	Pts
2026	MotoGP	Yamaha	THA; 17	BRA; 17	USA; 15	SPA; 19	FRA; 13	CAT; 16	ITA; 16	HUN; 11	CZE; 14	NED; Ret	GER; 15	GBR; 14	ARA; Ret	RSM; 12	AUT; 20	JPN; 17	INA; Ret	AUS	MAL	QAT; DNA	POR	VAL	22nd*	18*

* Season still in progress.

== Suzuka 8 Hours results ==
Year	Team	Riders	Bike	Pos
2019	(Japan) Kawasaki Racing Team Suzuka 8H	(United Kingdom) Leon Haslam (United Kingdom) Jonathan Rea	Kawasaki Ninja ZX-10RR	1st

== See also ==
- Kenan Sofuoğlu

== Bibliography ==
- Razgatlıoğlu, Toprak (1 January 2025). Toprak Razgatlıoğlu. Bkmkitap. ISBN 978-6259706924.
