= 2024 Superbike World Championship =

Motorsport championship

2024 Superbike World Championship
Previous:	2023	Next:	2025
Support series: Supersport World Championship; Supersport 300 World Championship; Women’s Circuit Racing World Championship; Yamaha R3 bLU cRU FIM World Cup

The 2024 Superbike World Championship was the 37th season of the Superbike World Championship. Toprak Razgatlıoğlu, who had previously won the championship in 2021, won his second Superbike world title, and marked BMW's first rider's title since entering world-level superbikes in 2011. Nicolò Bulega, 2023 World Supersport champion was runner-up in his rookie Superbike year.

Ducati won their 20th manufacturer's title. Danilo Petrucci won the Independent riders' championship on a Ducati.

The season hosted the inaugural FIM Women’s Motorcycling World Championship held as a support-class at selected European tracks.

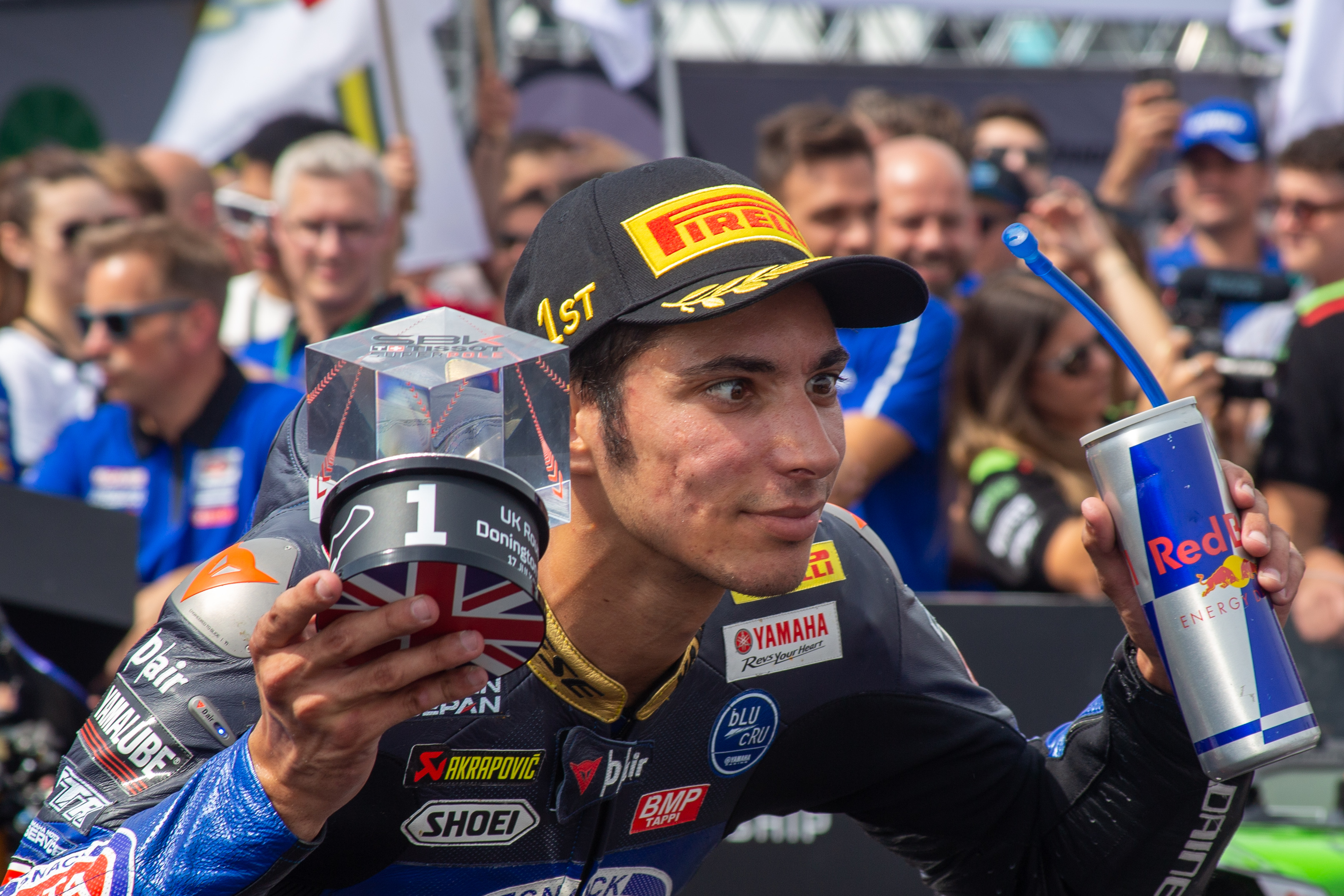
Toprak Razgatlıoğlu (pictured in 2022) won his second Superbike Championship.

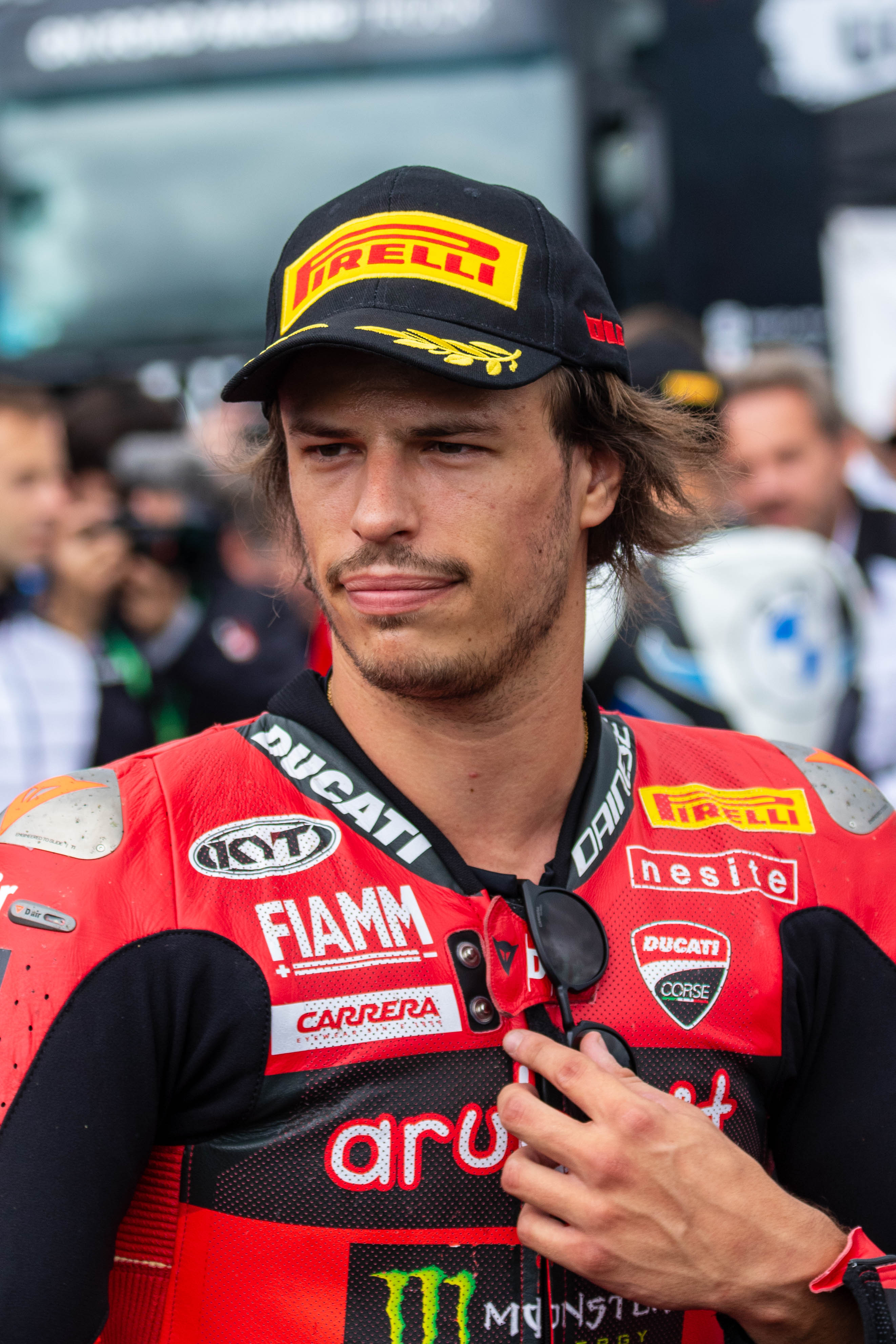
Nicolò Bulega finished second

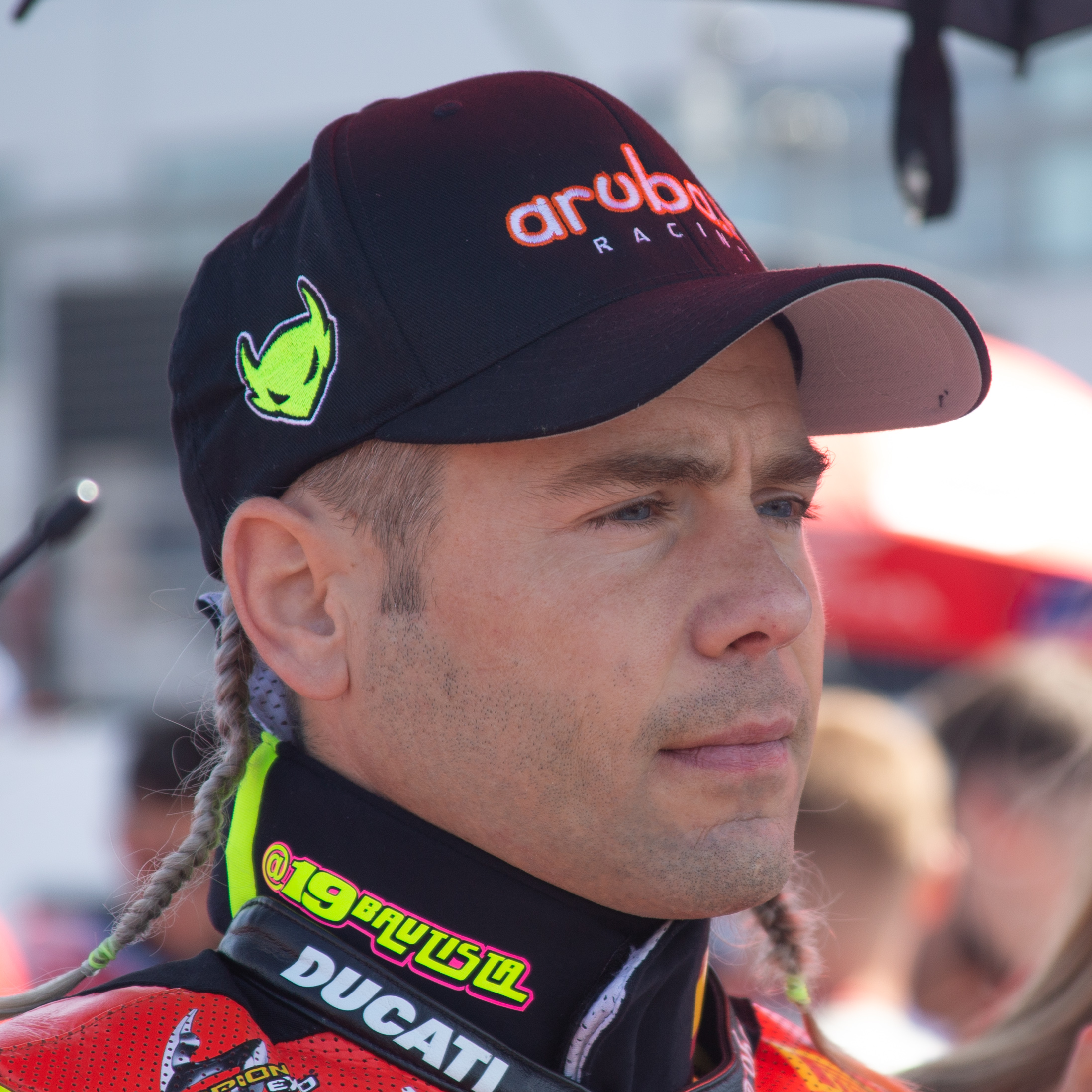
Defending Two-Time Champion Álvaro Bautista (pictured in 2022) finished third

== Race calendar and results ==
The provisional 2024 season calendar was announced on 26 October 2023. In June 2024, it was announced that the Hungarian round at the Balaton Park Circuit was cancelled and replaced by Estoril round at Circuito do Estoril due to the ongoing works at Balaton Park.

2024 Superbike World Championship Calendar
Round			Circuit	Date	Pole position	Fastest lap	Winning rider	Winning team	Winning constructor	Ref
1	R1	(Australia) Australian Round	Phillip Island Grand Prix Circuit	24 February	(Italy) Nicolò Bulega	(Italy) Nicolò Bulega	(Italy) Nicolò Bulega	Aruba.it Racing - Ducati	(Italy) Ducati	
1	SR	(Australia) Australian Round	Phillip Island Grand Prix Circuit	25 February	(Italy) Nicolò Bulega	(Spain) Álvaro Bautista	(United Kingdom) Alex Lowes	Kawasaki Racing Team WorldSBK	(Japan) Kawasaki	
1	R2	(Australia) Australian Round	Phillip Island Grand Prix Circuit	25 February		(Italy) Nicolò Bulega	(United Kingdom) Alex Lowes	Kawasaki Racing Team WorldSBK	(Japan) Kawasaki	
2	R1	(Catalonia) Catalunya Round	Circuit de Barcelona-Catalunya	23 March	(Turkey) Toprak Razgatlıoğlu	(United Kingdom) Sam Lowes	(Turkey) Toprak Razgatlıoğlu	ROKiT BMW Motorrad WorldSBK Team	(Germany) BMW	
2	SR	(Catalonia) Catalunya Round	Circuit de Barcelona-Catalunya	24 March	(Turkey) Toprak Razgatlıoğlu	(Italy) Nicolò Bulega	(Turkey) Toprak Razgatlıoğlu	ROKiT BMW Motorrad WorldSBK Team	(Germany) BMW	
2	R2	(Catalonia) Catalunya Round	Circuit de Barcelona-Catalunya	24 March		(Italy) Nicolò Bulega	(Spain) Álvaro Bautista	Aruba.it Racing - Ducati	(Italy) Ducati	
3	R1	(Netherlands) Dutch Round	TT Circuit Assen	20 April	(United Kingdom) Jonathan Rea	(Turkey) Toprak Razgatlıoğlu	(Italy) Nicholas Spinelli	Barni Spark Racing Team	(Italy) Ducati	
3	SR	(Netherlands) Dutch Round	TT Circuit Assen	21 April	(United Kingdom) Jonathan Rea	(Italy) Nicolò Bulega	(Spain) Álvaro Bautista	Aruba.it Racing - Ducati	(Italy) Ducati	
3	R2	(Netherlands) Dutch Round	TT Circuit Assen	21 April		(Australia) Remy Gardner	(Turkey) Toprak Razgatlıoğlu	ROKiT BMW Motorrad WorldSBK Team	(Germany) BMW	
4	R1	Emilia-Romagna Round	Misano World Circuit Marco Simoncelli	15 June	(Turkey) Toprak Razgatlıoğlu	(Italy) Nicolò Bulega	(Turkey) Toprak Razgatlıoğlu	ROKiT BMW Motorrad WorldSBK Team	(Germany) BMW	
4	SR	Emilia-Romagna Round	Misano World Circuit Marco Simoncelli	16 June	(Turkey) Toprak Razgatlıoğlu	(Turkey) Toprak Razgatlıoğlu	(Turkey) Toprak Razgatlıoğlu	ROKiT BMW Motorrad WorldSBK Team	(Germany) BMW	
4	R2	Emilia-Romagna Round	Misano World Circuit Marco Simoncelli	16 June		(Turkey) Toprak Razgatlıoğlu	(Turkey) Toprak Razgatlıoğlu	ROKiT BMW Motorrad WorldSBK Team	(Germany) BMW	
5	R1	(United Kingdom) UK Round	Donington Park	13 July	(Turkey) Toprak Razgatlıoğlu	(Turkey) Toprak Razgatlıoğlu	(Turkey) Toprak Razgatlıoğlu	ROKiT BMW Motorrad WorldSBK Team	(Germany) BMW	
5	SR	(United Kingdom) UK Round	Donington Park	14 July	(Turkey) Toprak Razgatlıoğlu	(Turkey) Toprak Razgatlıoğlu	(Turkey) Toprak Razgatlıoğlu	ROKiT BMW Motorrad WorldSBK Team	(Germany) BMW	
5	R2	(United Kingdom) UK Round	Donington Park	14 July		(Turkey) Toprak Razgatlıoğlu	(Turkey) Toprak Razgatlıoğlu	ROKiT BMW Motorrad WorldSBK Team	(Germany) BMW	
6	R1	(Czech Republic) Czech Round	Autodrom Most	20 July	(Turkey) Toprak Razgatlıoğlu	(Turkey) Toprak Razgatlıoğlu	(Turkey) Toprak Razgatlıoğlu	ROKiT BMW Motorrad WorldSBK Team	(Germany) BMW	
6	SR	(Czech Republic) Czech Round	Autodrom Most	21 July	(Turkey) Toprak Razgatlıoğlu	(Turkey) Toprak Razgatlıoğlu	(Turkey) Toprak Razgatlıoğlu	ROKiT BMW Motorrad WorldSBK Team	(Germany) BMW	
6	R2	(Czech Republic) Czech Round	Autodrom Most	21 July		(Netherlands) Michael van der Mark	(Turkey) Toprak Razgatlıoğlu	ROKiT BMW Motorrad WorldSBK Team	(Germany) BMW	
7	R1	(Portugal) Portuguese Round	Algarve International Circuit	10 August	(Turkey) Toprak Razgatlıoğlu	(Spain) Álvaro Bautista	(Turkey) Toprak Razgatlıoğlu	ROKiT BMW Motorrad WorldSBK Team	(Germany) BMW	
7	SR	(Portugal) Portuguese Round	Algarve International Circuit	11 August	(Turkey) Toprak Razgatlıoğlu	(Turkey) Toprak Razgatlıoğlu	(Turkey) Toprak Razgatlıoğlu	ROKiT BMW Motorrad WorldSBK Team	(Germany) BMW	
7	R2	(Portugal) Portuguese Round	Algarve International Circuit	11 August		(Spain) Álvaro Bautista	(Turkey) Toprak Razgatlıoğlu	ROKiT BMW Motorrad WorldSBK Team	(Germany) BMW	
8	R1	(France) French Round	Circuit de Nevers Magny-Cours	7 September	(United Kingdom) Alex Lowes	(Italy) Andrea Locatelli	(Netherlands) Michael van der Mark	ROKiT BMW Motorrad WorldSBK Team	(Germany) BMW	
8	SR	(France) French Round	Circuit de Nevers Magny-Cours	8 September	(United Kingdom) Alex Lowes	(United Kingdom) Alex Lowes	(Italy) Nicolò Bulega	Aruba.it Racing - Ducati	(Italy) Ducati	
8	R2	(France) French Round	Circuit de Nevers Magny-Cours	8 September		(Italy) Nicolò Bulega	(Italy) Nicolò Bulega	Aruba.it Racing - Ducati	(Italy) Ducati	
9	R1	(Italy) Italian Round	Cremona Circuit	21 September	(Italy) Nicolò Bulega	(Italy) Andrea Iannone	(Italy) Danilo Petrucci	Barni Spark Racing Team	(Italy) Ducati	
9	SR	(Italy) Italian Round	Cremona Circuit	22 September	(Italy) Nicolò Bulega	(Italy) Danilo Petrucci	(Italy) Danilo Petrucci	Barni Spark Racing Team	(Italy) Ducati	
9	R2	(Italy) Italian Round	Cremona Circuit	22 September		(Italy) Nicolò Bulega	(Italy) Danilo Petrucci	Barni Spark Racing Team	(Italy) Ducati	
10	R1	(Aragon) Aragón Round	MotorLand Aragón	28 September	(Italy) Nicolò Bulega	(Italy) Andrea Iannone	(Italy) Andrea Iannone	Team GoEleven	(Italy) Ducati	
10	SR	(Aragon) Aragón Round	MotorLand Aragón	29 September	(Italy) Nicolò Bulega	(Turkey) Toprak Razgatlıoğlu	(Spain) Álvaro Bautista	Aruba.it Racing - Ducati	(Italy) Ducati	
10	R2	(Aragon) Aragón Round	MotorLand Aragón	29 September		(Spain) Álvaro Bautista	(Spain) Álvaro Bautista	Aruba.it Racing - Ducati	(Italy) Ducati	
11	R1	(Portugal) Estoril Round	Circuito do Estoril	12 October (Note: The Estoril round was added to the calendar on 7 June 2024. It replaced the Hungarian round.)	(Turkey) Toprak Razgatlıoğlu	(Turkey) Toprak Razgatlıoğlu	(Turkey) Toprak Razgatlıoğlu	ROKiT BMW Motorrad WorldSBK Team	(Germany) BMW	
11	SR	(Portugal) Estoril Round	Circuito do Estoril	13 October	(Turkey) Toprak Razgatlıoğlu	(Italy) Nicolò Bulega	(Italy) Nicolò Bulega	Aruba.it Racing - Ducati	(Italy) Ducati	
11	R2	(Portugal) Estoril Round	Circuito do Estoril	13 October		(Turkey) Toprak Razgatlıoğlu	(Turkey) Toprak Razgatlıoğlu	ROKiT BMW Motorrad WorldSBK Team	(Germany) BMW	
12	R1	(Spain) Spanish Round	Circuito de Jerez	19 October	(Italy) Nicolò Bulega	(Italy) Nicolò Bulega	(Italy) Nicolò Bulega	Aruba.it Racing - Ducati	(Italy) Ducati	
12	SR	(Spain) Spanish Round	Circuito de Jerez	20 October	(Italy) Nicolò Bulega	(Italy) Nicolò Bulega	(Italy) Nicolò Bulega	Aruba.it Racing - Ducati	(Italy) Ducati	
12	R2	(Spain) Spanish Round	Circuito de Jerez	20 October		(Turkey) Toprak Razgatlıoğlu	(Turkey) Toprak Razgatlıoğlu	ROKiT BMW Motorrad WorldSBK Team	(Germany) BMW	
Races under contract to run in 2024, but cancelled:
C	R1	(Hungary) Hungarian Round	Balaton Park Circuit	N/A (Note: The Hungarian round was originally due to take place on 23–25 August 2024. It was cancelled and replaced by the Estoril round.)	—N/a					
C	SR	(Hungary) Hungarian Round	Balaton Park Circuit	N/A	—N/a					
C	R2	(Hungary) Hungarian Round	Balaton Park Circuit	N/A	—N/a					

== Entry list ==
2024 entry list
Team	Constructor	Motorcycle	No.	Rider	Rounds
(Germany) Bonovo Action BMW	BMW	M1000RR	31	(United States) Garrett Gerloff	All
(Germany) Bonovo Action BMW	BMW	M1000RR	45	(United Kingdom) Scott Redding	All
(Germany) ROKiT BMW Motorrad WorldSBK Team	BMW	M1000RR	37	(Germany) Markus Reiterberger	9
(Germany) ROKiT BMW Motorrad WorldSBK Team	BMW	M1000RR	54	(Turkey) Toprak Razgatlıoğlu	1–8, 10–12
(Germany) ROKiT BMW Motorrad WorldSBK Team	BMW	M1000RR	60	(Netherlands) Michael van der Mark	All
(Italy) Aruba.it Racing - Ducati	Ducati	Panigale V4 R	1	(Spain) Álvaro Bautista	All
(Italy) Aruba.it Racing - Ducati	Ducati	Panigale V4 R	11	(Italy) Nicolò Bulega	All
(Italy) Aruba.it Racing - Ducati	Ducati	Panigale V4 R	51	(Italy) Michele Pirro	4
(Italy) Barni Spark Racing Team	Ducati	Panigale V4 R	9	(Italy) Danilo Petrucci	1–2, 4–12
(Italy) Barni Spark Racing Team	Ducati	Panigale V4 R	24	(Italy) Nicholas Spinelli	3
(Belgium) Elf Marc VDS Racing Team	Ducati	Panigale V4 R	14	(United Kingdom) Sam Lowes	1–6, 8–12
(Malaysia) JDT Racing Team	Ducati	Panigale V4 R	10	(Malaysia) Hafizh Syahrin	7
(Italy) Motocorsa Racing	Ducati	Panigale V4 R	21	(Italy) Michael Ruben Rinaldi	All
(Italy) Team GoEleven	Ducati	Panigale V4 R	29	(Italy) Andrea Iannone	All
(Japan) Team HRC	Honda	CBR1000RR-R	7	(Spain) Iker Lecuona	All
(Japan) Team HRC	Honda	CBR1000RR-R	49	(Japan) Tetsuta Nagashima	12
(Japan) Team HRC	Honda	CBR1000RR-R	97	(Spain) Xavi Vierge	All
(Japan) Petronas MIE Racing Honda Team	Honda	CBR1000RR-R	27	(Malaysia) Adam Norrodin	1–5, 7, 10
(Japan) Petronas MIE Racing Honda Team	Honda	CBR1000RR-R	36	(Argentina) Leandro Mercado	6
(Japan) Petronas MIE Racing Honda Team	Honda	CBR1000RR-R	79	(United States) Hayden Gillim	6
(Japan) Petronas MIE Racing Honda Team	Honda	CBR1000RR-R	75	(Portugal) Ivo Lopes	7–9, 11–12
(Japan) Petronas MIE Racing Honda Team	Honda	CBR1000RR-R	95	(United Kingdom) Tarran Mackenzie	1–5, 8–12
(United Kingdom) Team HRC UK	Honda	CBR1000RR-R	46	(United Kingdom) Tommy Bridewell	9, 12
(Japan) Kawasaki Racing Team WorldSBK	Kawasaki	Ninja ZX-10RR	22	(United Kingdom) Alex Lowes	All
(Japan) Kawasaki Racing Team WorldSBK	Kawasaki	Ninja ZX-10RR	47	(Italy) Axel Bassani	All
(Italy) Kawasaki Puccetti Racing	Kawasaki	Ninja ZX-10RR	53	(Spain) Tito Rabat	All
(France) GMT94 Yamaha	Yamaha	YZF-R1	5	(Germany) Philipp Öttl	All
(Italy) Yamaha Motoxracing WorldSBK Team	Yamaha	YZF-R1	28	(United Kingdom) Bradley Ray	All
(Italy) Yamaha Motoxracing WorldSBK Team	Yamaha	YZF-R1	52	(Italy) Alessandro Delbianco	9
(Italy) Yamaha Motoxracing WorldSBK Team	Yamaha	YZF-R1	91	(San Marino) Luca Bernardi	11–12
(Japan) Pata Yamaha Prometeon WorldSBK	Yamaha	YZF-R1	55	(Italy) Andrea Locatelli	All
(Japan) Pata Yamaha Prometeon WorldSBK	Yamaha	YZF-R1	59	(Italy) Niccolò Canepa	9
(Japan) Pata Yamaha Prometeon WorldSBK	Yamaha	YZF-R1	65	(United Kingdom) Jonathan Rea	1–8, 10–12
(Italy) GYTR GRT Yamaha WorldSBK Team	Yamaha	YZF-R1	17	(Germany) Marvin Fritz	9–10
(Italy) GYTR GRT Yamaha WorldSBK Team	Yamaha	YZF-R1	52	(Italy) Alessandro Delbianco	8, 12
(Italy) GYTR GRT Yamaha WorldSBK Team	Yamaha	YZF-R1	77	(Switzerland) Dominique Aegerter	1–7, 11–12
(Italy) GYTR GRT Yamaha WorldSBK Team	Yamaha	YZF-R1	87	(Australia) Remy Gardner	1–11
(United Kingdom) OMG Racing Yamaha	Yamaha	YZF-R1	33	(United Kingdom) Kyle Ryde	12

Key
Regular rider
Wildcard rider
Replacement rider

=== Rider changes ===
- Toprak Razgatlıoğlu will move to ROKiT BMW Motorrad WorldSBK Team from Pata Yamaha. He will replace Scott Redding, who has moved to BMW’s satellite team, Bonovo Action BMW. Loris Baz will leave the team after two years.
- After nine years with Kawasaki Racing Team, Jonathan Rea will replace Toprak Razgatlıoğlu at the Pata Yamaha factory team. After three years with Motocorsa Racing, Axel Bassani will ride for Kawasaki Racing Team, replacing Rea.
- Nicolò Bulega will be promoted from the Supersport World Championship to Aruba.it Racing's Superbike World Championship team, replacing Michael Ruben Rinaldi, who will still ride a Ducati, but for Motocorsa Racing.
- Sam Lowes and his Marc VDS team will enter the Superbike World Championship from Moto2, with their bike being supplied by Ducati.
- Andrea Iannone joins the World Superbike grid after having served a four-year ban, riding for Team GoEleven, replacing Philipp Öttl. Öttl will stay on the Superbike grid, joining GMT94 Yamaha, replacing the 2022 Supersport runner up Lorenzo Baldassarri.
- Both Tarran Mackenzie and Adam Norrodin have been promoted by their 2023 Supersport team, Petronas MIE Racing Honda, to the World Superbike grid, replacing Hafizh Syahrin and Eric Granado.

== Championship standings ==
Points were awarded as follows:

Race 1 and Race 2

Position	**1st**	**2nd**	**3rd**	**4th**	**5th**	**6th**	**7th**	**8th**	**9th**	**10th**	**11th**	**12th**	**13th**	**14th**	**15th**
Points	25	20	16	13	11	10	9	8	7	6	5	4	3	2	1

Superpole Race

Position	**1st**	**2nd**	**3rd**	**4th**	**5th**	**6th**	**7th**	**8th**	**9th**
Points	12	9	7	6	5	4	3	2	1

=== Riders' championship ===
Pos.	Rider	Bike	PHI (Australia)			BAR (Spain)			ASS (Netherlands)			MIS (Italy)			DON (United Kingdom)			MOS (Czech Republic)			POR (Portugal)			MAG (France)			CRE (Italy)			ARA (Spain)			EST (Portugal)			JER (Spain)			Pts.
Pos.	Rider	Bike	R1	SR	R2	R1	SR	R2	R1	SR	R2	R1	SR	R2	R1	SR	R2	R1	SR	R2	R1	SR	R2	R1	SR	R2	R1	SR	R2	R1	SR	R2	R1	SR	R2	R1	SR	R2	Pts.
1	(Turkey) Toprak Razgatlıoğlu	BMW	5	3	Ret	**1**	**1**	3	2	9	1	**1**	**1**	1	**1**	**1**	1	**1**	**1**	1	**1**	**1**	1	WD	WD	WD				2	2	2	**1**	**2**	1	2	2	1	527
2	(Italy) Nicolò Bulega	Ducati	**1**	**5**	5	2	4	2	11	2	8	2	2	2	4	2	2	6	2	2	7	5	2	Ret	1	1	**2**	**4**	3	**Ret**	**3**	3	2	1	2	**1**	**1**	2	484
3	(Spain) Álvaro Bautista	Ducati	15	4	2	3	3	1	3	1	2	3	17	3	3	6	5	4	NC	Ret	2	6	19	2	Ret	DNS	3	6	2	4	1	1	19	3	3	Ret	9	Ret	357
4	(United Kingdom) Alex Lowes	Kawasaki	4	1	1	6	5	6	5	3	Ret	5	3	4	2	5	3	Ret	3	9	5	3	3	**Ret**	**2**	4	20	2	5	7	Ret	DNS	4	6	12	4	3	5	316
5	(Italy) Danilo Petrucci	Ducati	8	15	3	7	7	5				9	9	6	7	9	6	2	4	Ret	3	2	5	3	3	2	1	1	1	5	6	6	Ret	5	7	Ret	4	6	307
6	(Netherlands) Michael van der Mark	BMW	7	16	9	9	6	4	7	8	9	8	12	Ret	9	12	12	9	9	5	6	4	7	1	8	5	7	12	7	9	8	7	7	12	5	6	6	3	245
7	(Italy) Andrea Locatelli	Yamaha	2	2	Ret	5	8	13	12	6	5	4	4	5	6	7	7	7	6	3	11	13	11	8	Ret	9	12	7	9	10	11	9	Ret	4	Ret	3	5	8	232
8	(Italy) Andrea Iannone	Ducati	3	14	4	4	2	Ret	Ret	15	4	7	5	11	11	10	Ret	3	7	8	Ret	9	4	5	11	12	Ret	3	Ret	1	4	4	9	9	8	12	7	4	231
9	(United States) Garrett Gerloff	BMW	9	13	8	12	17	10	16	11	12	12	Ret	18	14	14	13	8	12	12	4	11	8	12	6	3	8	9	4	3	5	5	6	11	Ret	10	8	7	176
10	(Australia) Remy Gardner	Yamaha	Ret	6	12	15	9	7	4	4	3	6	Ret	8	10	13	11	5	5	4	10	15	12	Ret	9	6	10	Ret	Ret	16	13	15	Ret	DNS	DNS				140
11	(Spain) Xavi Vierge	Honda	10	12	13	14	15	14	10	12	10	16	13	Ret	Ret	15	15	14	Ret	11	13	7	9	7	5	7	6	8	8	8	9	10	8	7	6	7	Ret	13	137
12	(Spain) Iker Lecuona	Honda	DNS	WD	WD	13	21	Ret	WD	WD	WD	10	7	9	13	17	14	Ret	14	10	12	14	13	6	7	10	4	5	6	6	7	8	3	8	Ret	5	Ret	DNS	134
13	(United Kingdom) Jonathan Rea	Yamaha	17	10	Ret	Ret	12	8	**6**	**5**	19	Ret	8	10	5	3	8	10	8	6	15	10	6	Ret	DNS	DNS				14	12	13	5	22	4	11	11	9	127
14	(Italy) Axel Bassani	Kawasaki	12	11	11	10	14	Ret	9	13	18	11	6	7	12	Ret	10	16	13	Ret	8	12	15	11	10	11	5	11	Ret	12	15	12	Ret	12	10	8	14	10	108
15	(United Kingdom) Scott Redding	BMW	11	17	17	17	12	11	8	10	Ret	15	14	12	Ret	4	4	15	Ret	13	Ret	17	14	4	4	8	13	13	12	11	10	11	12	10	11	14	12	12	107
16	(Switzerland) Dominique Aegerter	Yamaha	6	7	10	8	10	9	13	14	7	Ret	10	Ret	8	11	9	13	18	16	9	8	10										14	16	13	9	10	Ret	91
17	(Italy) Michael Ruben Rinaldi	Ducati	14	9	6	11	18	Ret	Ret	16	13	14	11	16	15	16	17	11	10	7	16	19	16	9	12	15	9	17	13	13	14	14	11	14	9	Ret	13	11	78
18	(United Kingdom) Sam Lowes	Ducati	13	8	7	Ret	11	12	19	7	6	Ret	Ret	13	19	8	16	12	Ret	DNS				Ret	16	Ret	Ret	14	11	Ret	DNS	DNS	13	15	Ret	13	17	14	53
19	(Italy) Nicholas Spinelli	Ducati							1	18	16																												25
20	(Spain) Tito Rabat	Kawasaki	18	19	16	21	16	15	Ret	Ret	15	19	15	14	17	18	19	17	15	14	14	16	17	Ret	17	14	Ret	10	10	Ret	17	17	10	17	Ret	16	15	NC	22
21	(United Kingdom) Bradley Ray	Yamaha	21	21	15	18	22	Ret	15	20	17	18	20	17	16	19	18	19	16	15	17	18	18	Ret	15	17	11	15	14	15	16	16	16	18	14	17	16	15	14
22	(Italy) Alessandro Delbianco	Yamaha																						10	13	13	15	20	16							19	18	17	10
23	(United Kingdom) Tarran Mackenzie	Honda	19	Ret	18	16	20	17	14	17	11	Ret	18	19	Ret	DNS	DNS							Ret	18	18	Ret	23	Ret	18	19	18	18	19	Ret	24	21	Ret	7
24	(Germany) Philipp Öttl	Yamaha	16	18	14	19	19	16	18	19	14	17	19	15	18	20	20	18	17	Ret	DSQ	21	21	Ret	14	16	16	19	17	17	18	19	17	21	16	18	22	Ret	5
25	(Italy) Michele Pirro	Ducati										13	16	Ret																									3
26	(Germany) Markus Reiterberger	BMW																									14	16	15										3
27	(Portugal) Ivo Lopes	Honda																			19	22	20	Ret	19	19	19	22	20				15	20	15	20	23	18	2
28	(Japan) Tetsuta Nagashima	Honda																																		15	19	16	1
29	(Malaysia) Adam Norrodin	Honda	20	20	19	20	Ret	18	17	Ret	20	20	21	Ret	20	21	Ret				WD	WD	WD							WD	WD	WD							0
30	(Germany) Marvin Fritz	Yamaha																									17	Ret	18	Ret	Ret	Ret							0
31	(Argentina) Leandro Mercado	Honda																20	19	17																			0
32	(San Marino) Luca Bernardi	Yamaha																															20	23	17	21	24	19	0
33	(Italy) Niccolò Canepa	Yamaha																									Ret	18	19										0
34	(United States) Hayden Gillim	Honda																21	20	18																			0
35	(United Kingdom) Tommy Bridewell	Honda																									18	21	DNS							Ret	20	Ret	0
36	(Malaysia) Hafizh Syahrin	Ducati																			18	20	22																0
37	(United Kingdom) Kyle Ryde	Yamaha																																		22	DNS	DNS	0
Pos.	Rider	Bike	PHI (Australia)			BAR (Spain)			ASS (Netherlands)			MIS (Italy)			DON (United Kingdom)			MOS (Czech Republic)			POR (Portugal)			MAG (France)			CRE (Italy)			ARA (Spain)			EST (Portugal)			JER (Spain)			Pts.

Colour	Result
Gold	Winner
Silver	Second place
Bronze	Third place
Green	Points classification
Blue	Non-points classification
Blue	Non-classified finish (NC)
Purple	Retired, not classified (Ret)
Red	Did not qualify (DNQ)
Red	Did not pre-qualify (DNPQ)
Black	Disqualified (DSQ)
White	Did not start (DNS)
White	Withdrew (WD)
White	Race cancelled (C)
Blank	Did not practice (DNP)
Blank	Did not arrive (DNA)
Blank	Excluded (EX)

**Bold** – Pole position
Italics – Fastest lap

=== Teams' championship ===
Pos.	Rider	Bike No.	PHI (Australia)			BAR (Spain)			ASS (Netherlands)			MIS (Italy)			DON (United Kingdom)			MOS (Czech Republic)			POR (Portugal)			MAG (France)			CRE (Italy)			ARA (Spain)			EST (Portugal)			JER (Spain)			Pts.
Pos.	Rider	Bike No.	R1	SR	R2	R1	SR	R2	R1	SR	R2	R1	SR	R2	R1	SR	R2	R1	SR	R2	R1	SR	R2	R1	SR	R2	R1	SR	R2	R1	SR	R2	R1	SR	R2	R1	SR	R2	Pts.
1	Aruba.it Racing - Ducati	1	15	4	2	3	3	1	3	1	2	3	17	3	3	6	5	4	NC	Ret	2	6	Ret	2	DNS	DNS	3	6	2	4	1	1	19	3	3	Ret	9	Ret	841
1	Aruba.it Racing - Ducati	11	**1**	**5**	5	2	4	2	11	2	8	2	2	2	4	2	2	6	2	2	7	5	2	Ret	1	1	**2**	**4**	3	**Ret**	**3**	3	2	1	2	**1**	**1**	2	841
2	ROKiT BMW Motorrad WorldSBK Team	37																									14	16	15										747
2	ROKiT BMW Motorrad WorldSBK Team	54	5	3	Ret	**1**	**1**	3	2	9	1	**1**	**1**	1	**1**	**1**	1	**1**	**1**	1	**1**	**1**	1	WD	WD	WD				2	2	2	**1**	**2**	1	2	2	1	747
2	ROKiT BMW Motorrad WorldSBK Team	60	7	16	9	9	6	4	7	8	9	8	12	Ret	9	12	12	9	9	5	6	4	7	1	8	5	7	12	7	9	8	7	7	12	5	6	6	3	747
3	Kawasaki Racing Team WorldSBK	22	4	1	1	6	5	6	5	3	Ret	5	3	4	2	5	3	Ret	3	9	5	3	3	**Ret**	**2**	4	20	2	5	7	Ret	DNS	4	6	12	4	3	5	445
3	Kawasaki Racing Team WorldSBK	47	12	11	11	10	14	Ret	9	13	18	11	6	7	12	Ret	10	16	13	Ret	8	12	15	11	10	11	5	11	Ret	12	15	12	Ret	12	10	8	14	10	445
4	Pata Yamaha Prometeon WorldSBK	55	2	2	Ret	5	8	13	12	6	5	4	4	5	6	7	7	7	6	3	11	13	15	8	Ret	9	12	7	9	10	11	9	Ret	4	Ret	3	5	8	377
4	Pata Yamaha Prometeon WorldSBK	59																									Ret	18	19										377
4	Pata Yamaha Prometeon WorldSBK	65	17	10	Ret	Ret	13	8	**6**	**5**	19	Ret	8	10	5	3	8	10	8	6	15	10	6	Ret	DNS	DNS				14	12	13	5	22	4	11	11	9	377
5	Barni Spark Racing Team	9	8	16	3	7	7	5				9	9	6	7	9	6	2	4	Ret	3	2	5	3	3	2	1	1	1	5	6	6	Ret	5	7	Ret	4	6	345
5	Barni Spark Racing Team	24							1	18	16																												345
6	Bonovo Action BMW	31	9	13	8	12	17	10	16	11	12	12	Ret	18	14	14	13	8	12	12	4	11	8	12	6	3	8	9	4	3	5	5	6	11	Ret	10	8	7	304
6	Bonovo Action BMW	45	11	17	17	17	12	11	8	10	Ret	15	14	12	Ret	4	4	15	Ret	13	Ret	17	14	4	4	8	13	13	12	11	10	11	12	10	11	14	12	12	304
7	Team HRC	7	DNS	WD	WD	13	21	Ret	WD	WD	WD	10	7	9	13	17	14	Ret	14	10	12	14	13	6	7	10	4	5	6	6	7	8	3	8	Ret	5	Ret	DNS	282
7	Team HRC	97	10	12	13	14	15	14	10	12	10	16	13	Ret	Ret	15	15	14	Ret	11	13	7	9	7	5	7	6	8	8	8	9	10	8	7	6	7	Ret	13	282
8	GYTR GRT Yamaha WorldSBK Team	17																									17	Ret	18	Ret	Ret	Ret							246
8	GYTR GRT Yamaha WorldSBK Team	52																						10	13	13										19	18	17	246
8	GYTR GRT Yamaha WorldSBK Team	77	6	7	10	8	10	9	13	14	7	Ret	10	Ret	8	11	9	13	18	16	9	8	10										14	16	13	9	10	Ret	246
8	GYTR GRT Yamaha WorldSBK Team	87	Ret	6	12	15	9	7	4	4	3	6	Ret	8	10	13	11	5	5	4	10	15	12	Ret	9	6	10	Ret	Ret	16	13	15	Ret	DNS	DNS				246
9	Team GoEleven	29	3	14	4	4	2	Ret	Ret	15	4	7	5	11	11	10	Ret	3	7	8	Ret	9	4	5	11	12	Ret	3	Ret	1	4	4	9	9	8	12	7	4	231
10	Motocorsa Racing	21	14	9	6	11	18	Ret	Ret	16	13	14	11	16	15	16	17	11	10	7	16	19	16	9	12	15	9	17	13	13	14	14	11	14	9	Ret	13	11	78
11	Elf Marc VDS Racing Team	14	13	8	7	Ret	11	12	19	7	6	Ret	Ret	13	19	8	16	12	Ret	DNS				Ret	16	Ret	Ret	14	11	Ret	DNS	DNS	13	15	Ret	13	17	14	53
12	Kawasaki Puccetti Racing	53	18	19	16	21	16	15	Ret	Ret	15	19	15	14	17	18	19	17	15	14	14	16	17	Ret	17	14	Ret	10	10	Ret	17	17	10	17	Ret	16	15	NC	22
13	Yamaha Motoxracing WorldSBK Team	28	21	21	15	18	22	Ret	15	20	17	18	20	17	16	19	18	19	16	15	17	18	18	Ret	15	17	11	15	14	15	16	16	16	18	14	17	16	15	15
13	Yamaha Motoxracing WorldSBK Team	52																									15	20	16										15
14	Petronas MIE Racing Honda Team	27	20	20	19	20	Ret	18	17	Ret	20	20	21	Ret	20	21	Ret				WD	WD	WD							WD	WD	WD							9
14	Petronas MIE Racing Honda Team	36																20	19	17																			9
14	Petronas MIE Racing Honda Team	75																			19	22	20	Ret	19	19	19	22	20				15	20	15	20	23	18	9
14	Petronas MIE Racing Honda Team	79																21	20	18																			9
14	Petronas MIE Racing Honda Team	95	19	Ret	18	16	20	17	14	17	11	Ret	18	19	Ret	DNS	DNS							Ret	18	18	Ret	23	Ret	18	19	18	18	19	Ret	24	21	Ret	9
15	GMT94 Yamaha	5	16	18	14	19	19	16	18	19	14	17	19	15	18	20	20	18	17	Ret	DSQ	21	21	Ret	14	16	16	19	17	17	18	19	17	21	16	18	22	Ret	5
Pos.	Rider	Bike No.	PHI (Australia)			BAR (Spain)			ASS (Netherlands)			MIS (Italy)			DON (United Kingdom)			MOS (Czech Republic)			POR (Portugal)			MAG (France)			CRE (Italy)			ARA (Spain)			EST (Portugal)			JER (Spain)			Pts.

=== Manufacturers' championship ===
Pos.	Manufacturer	PHI (Australia)			BAR (Spain)			ASS (Netherlands)			MIS (Italy)			DON (United Kingdom)			MOS (Czech Republic)			POR (Portugal)			MAG (France)			CRE (Italy)			ARA (Spain)			EST (Portugal)			JER (Spain)			Pts.
Pos.	Manufacturer	R1	SR	R2	R1	SR	R2	R1	SR	R2	R1	SR	R2	R1	SR	R2	R1	SR	R2	R1	SR	R2	R1	SR	R2	R1	SR	R2	R1	SR	R2	R1	SR	R2	R1	SR	R2	Pts.
1	(Italy) Ducati	1	4	2	2	2	1	1	1	2	2	2	2	3	2	2	2	2	2	2	2	2	2	1	1	1	1	1	1	1	1	2	1	2	1	1	2	644
2	(Germany) BMW	5	3	8	1	1	3	2	8	1	1	1	1	1	1	1	1	1	1	1	1	1	1	4	3	7	9	4	2	2	2	1	2	1	2	2	1	606
3	(Japan) Kawasaki	4	1	1	6	5	6	5	3	15	5	3	4	2	5	3	16	3	9	5	3	3	11	2	4	5	2	5	7	15	12	4	6	10	4	3	5	339
4	(Japan) Yamaha	2	2	10	5	8	7	4	4	3	4	4	5	5	3	7	5	5	3	9	8	6	8	9	6	10	7	9	10	11	9	5	4	4	3	5	8	307
5	(Japan) Honda	10	12	13	13	15	14	10	12	10	10	7	9	13	15	14	14	11	10	12	7	9	6	5	7	4	5	6	6	7	8	3	7	6	5	21	13	185
Pos.	Manufacturer	PHI (Australia)			BAR (Spain)			ASS (Netherlands)			MIS (Italy)			DON (United Kingdom)			MOS (Czech Republic)			POR (Portugal)			MAG (France)			CRE (Italy)			ARA (Spain)			EST (Portugal)			JER (Spain)			Pts.
