= 2017 European Superstock 1000 Championship =

2017 FIM Superstock 1000 Cup
Previous:	2016	Next:	2018
Support series: Superbike World Championship; Supersport World Championship; Supersport 300 World Championship

The 2017 European Superstock 1000 Championship was the nineteenth season of the FIM Superstock 1000 Cup, the thirteenth held under this name. The championship, a support class to the Superbike World Championship at its European rounds, used 1000 cc motorcycles and was reserved for riders between 16 and 28 years of age. The season was contested over ninth races, beginning at Motorland Aragón on 2 April and ending at Circuito de Jerez on 22 October.

== Race calendar and results ==
2017 calendar
Round	Country	Circuit	Date	Pole position	Fastest lap	Winning rider	Winning team
1	Spain	Motorland Aragón	2 April	(Italy) Michael Ruben Rinaldi	(Italy) Michael Ruben Rinaldi	(Italy) Michael Ruben Rinaldi	Aruba.it Racing – Junior Team
2	Netherlands	TT Circuit Assen	30 April	(France) Florian Marino	(Italy) Michael Ruben Rinaldi	(Turkey) Toprak Razgatlıoğlu	Kawasaki Puccetti Racing
3	Italy	Autodromo Enzo e Dino Ferrari	14 May	(Italy) Michael Ruben Rinaldi	(Chile) Maximilian Scheib	(Italy) Michael Ruben Rinaldi	Aruba.it Racing – Junior Team
4	United Kingdom	Donington Park	28 May	(Italy) Michael Ruben Rinaldi	(France) Florian Marino	(Turkey) Toprak Razgatlıoğlu	Kawasaki Puccetti Racing
5	Italy	Misano World Circuit Marco Simoncelli	18 June	(Italy) Michael Ruben Rinaldi	(Italy) Marco Faccani	(Italy) Marco Faccani	Althea BMW Racing Team
6	Germany	Lausitzring	20 August	(Italy) Federico Sandi	(Italy) Federico Sandi	(Italy) Michael Ruben Rinaldi	Aruba.it Racing – Junior Team
7	Portugal	Autódromo Internacional do Algarve	17 September	(France) Florian Marino	(Turkey) Toprak Razgatlıoğlu	(Turkey) Toprak Razgatlıoğlu	Kawasaki Puccetti Racing
8	France	Circuit de Nevers Magny-Cours	1 October	(Italy) Roberto Tamburini	(France) Florian Marino	(France) Jérémy Guarnoni	Pedercini Racing Kawasaki
9	Spain	Circuito de Jerez	22 October	(Germany) Markus Reiterberger	(Australia) Mike Jones	(Germany) Markus Reiterberger	Van Zon Remeha BMW

== Entry list ==
2017 entry list
Team	Constructor	Motorcycle	No.	Rider	Rounds
Nuova M2 Racing	Aprilia	Aprilia RSV4 RF	9	(Italy) Andrea Mantovani	9
Nuova M2 Racing	Aprilia	Aprilia RSV4 RF	70	(Italy) Luca Vitali	All
Nuova M2 Racing	Aprilia	Aprilia RSV4 RF	71	(Chile) Maximilian Scheib	All
2R Road Racing	BMW	BMW S1000R	18	(Italy) Riccardo Cecchini	6–9
2R Road Racing	BMW	BMW S1000R	31	(Italy) Matteo Ferrari	5
2R Road Racing	BMW	BMW S1000R	81	(Italy) Alex Bernardi	1–4
2R Road Racing	BMW	BMW S1000R	88	(Chile) Vicente Kruger	9
Althea BMW Racing Team	BMW	BMW S1000R	5	(Italy) Marco Faccani	All
Althea MF84	BMW	BMW S1000R	19	(Germany) Julian Puffe	All
Berclaz Racing Team SA	BMW	BMW S1000R	3	(Switzerland) Sébastien Suchet	All
Berclaz Racing Team SA	BMW	BMW S1000R	23	(Italy) Federico Sandi	All
Clasitaly	BMW	BMW S1000R	13	(Italy) Federico Sanchioni	1–6
D.K.Racing	BMW	BMW S1000R	6	(Italy) Emanuele Pusceddu	4–9
D.K.Racing	BMW	BMW S1000R	26	(Italy) Marco Sbaiz	1–2
DMR Racing Team	BMW	BMW S1000R	31	(Italy) Matteo Ferrari	3
FDA Racing Team	BMW	BMW S1000R	41	(Italy) Federico D'Annunzio	1–3, 5–9
Motos Vionnet	BMW	BMW S1000R	51	(Switzerland) Eric Vionnet	3, 5–9
TECMAS	BMW	BMW S1000R	10	(France) Maxime Bonnot	8
Van Zon Remeha; Van Zon Remeha BMW	BMW	BMW S1000R	4	(Netherlands) Danny de Boer	2
Van Zon Remeha; Van Zon Remeha BMW	BMW	BMW S1000R	28	(Germany) Markus Reiterberger	9
Aruba.it Racing – Junior Team	Ducati	Ducati 1199 Panigale R	12	(Italy) Michael Ruben Rinaldi	All
Aruba.it Racing – Junior Team	Ducati	Ducati 1199 Panigale R	57	(Australia) Mike Jones	All
EAB Schacht Racing Team	Ducati	Ducati 1199 Panigale R	59	(Denmark) Alex Schacht	All
Agro On-Benjan-Kawasaki	Kawasaki	Kawasaki ZX-10R	33	(United States) Kyle Wyman	4
Agro On-Benjan-Kawasaki	Kawasaki	Kawasaki ZX-10R	68	(Australia) Glenn Scott	All
Agro On-Benjan-Kawasaki	Kawasaki	Kawasaki ZX-10R	77	(Netherlands) Wayne Tessels	All
Agro On-Benjan-Kawasaki	Kawasaki	Kawasaki ZX-10R	90	(Germany) Toni Finsterbusch	1–3, 5–9
DDM by BWG_Bike & Motor RT_Grimaldi	Kawasaki	Kawasaki ZX-10R	8	(Italy) Alessandro Nocco	1–4
DDM by BWG_Bike & Motor RT_Grimaldi	Kawasaki	Kawasaki ZX-10R	14	(Italy) Kevin Manfredi	1–5
DDM by BWG_Bike & Motor RT_Grimaldi	Kawasaki	Kawasaki ZX-10R	18	(Italy) Riccardo Cecchini	1–5
DDM by BWG_Bike & Motor RT_Grimaldi	Kawasaki	Kawasaki ZX-10R	66	(South Africa) Daryn Upton	5
ETG Racing	Kawasaki	Kawasaki ZX-10R	34	(Spain) Xavier Pinsach	1–2, 5–9
Flemmbo Leader Team	Kawasaki	Kawasaki ZX-10R	46	(France) Maxime Cudeville	All
kawasaki Palmento PL Racing	Kawasaki	Kawasaki ZX-10R	17	(Spain) Lucas de Ulacia	9
Kawasaki Puccetti Racing	Kawasaki	Kawasaki ZX-10R	54	(Turkey) Toprak Razgatlıoğlu	All
Motomarket Racing	Kawasaki	Kawasaki ZX-10R	91	(Finland) Eeki Kuparinen	9
Pedercini Racing Kawasaki	Kawasaki	Kawasaki ZX-10R	11	(France) Jérémy Guarnoni	All
TripleM Racing	Kawasaki	Kawasaki ZX-10R	32	(Germany) Marc Moser	All
TripleM Racing	Kawasaki	Kawasaki ZX-10R	55	(Ukraine) Illia Mykhalchyk	All
JEG . Kagayama	Suzuki	Suzuki GSX-R1000	94	(Japan) Naomichi Uramoto	9
RSV Phoenix Suzuki; Phoenix Suzuki Racing	Suzuki	Suzuki GSX-R1000	6	(Italy) Emanuele Pusceddu	1–3
RSV Phoenix Suzuki; Phoenix Suzuki Racing	Suzuki	Suzuki GSX-R1000	16	(Italy) Gabriele Ruiu	5
RSV Phoenix Suzuki; Phoenix Suzuki Racing	Suzuki	Suzuki GSX-R1000	74	(Italy) Kevin Calia	1–5
Bayer-Bikerbox Yamahichi	Yamaha	Yamaha YZF-R1	7	(Germany) Marvin Fritz	1–2, 5–6, 8–9
Cardoso School Racing	Yamaha	Yamaha YZF-R1	15	(Spain) Alejandro Medina	9
FM Moto Racing	Yamaha	Yamaha YZF-R1	22	(Italy) Stefano Fugardi	5
PATA Yamaha Official STK 1000 Team	Yamaha	Yamaha YZF-R1	2	(Italy) Roberto Tamburini	All
PATA Yamaha Official STK 1000 Team	Yamaha	Yamaha YZF-R1	21	(France) Florian Marino	All
Speed Action by Andreozzi R.C.	Yamaha	Yamaha YZF-R1	121	(Italy) Alessandro Andreozzi	5
Speed Action by Andreozzi R.C.	Yamaha	Yamaha YZF-R1	155	(Italy) Fabio Marchionni	5
Team SWPN	Yamaha	Yamaha YZF-R1	50	(Netherlands) Pepijn Bijsterbosch	2
Team Trasimeno	Yamaha	Yamaha YZF-R1	16	(Italy) Gabriele Ruiu	7–9
Team Trasimeno	Yamaha	Yamaha YZF-R1	25	(Italy) Walter Sulis	6
Team Trasimeno	Yamaha	Yamaha YZF-R1	92	(Switzerland) Leu Bryan	1–5
Team Yamaha MGM	Yamaha	Yamaha YZF-R1	36	(Germany) Florian Alt	9
TheBlackSheep Team	Yamaha	Yamaha YZF-R1	81	(Italy) Alex Bernardi	5–9
TheBlackSheep Team	Yamaha	Yamaha YZF-R1	87	(Italy) Luca Marconi	1–3
Tucci Racing Team	Yamaha	Yamaha YZF-R1	44	(Italy) Andrea Tucci	1–3
Tucci Racing Team	Yamaha	Yamaha YZF-R1	61	(Italy) Alessio Terziani	8–9
Tucci Racing Team	Yamaha	Yamaha YZF-R1	123	(Italy) Luca Savadori	5

Key
Regular rider
Wildcard rider
Replacement rider

- All entries used Pirelli tyres.

== Championship standings ==
=== Riders' championship ===
Position	**1st**	**2nd**	**3rd**	**4th**	**5th**	**6th**	**7th**	**8th**	**9th**	**10th**	**11th**	**12th**	**13th**	**14th**	**15th**
Points	25	20	16	13	11	10	9	8	7	6	5	4	3	2	1

Pos.	Rider	Bike	ARA (Spain)	ASS (Netherlands)	IMO (Italy)	DON (United Kingdom)	MIS (Italy)	LAU (Germany)	ALG (Portugal)	MAG (France)	JER (Spain)	Pts
1	(Italy) Michael Ruben Rinaldi	Ducati	**1**	2	**1**	**Ret**	**2**	1	9	10	6	138
2	(Turkey) Toprak Razgatlıoğlu	Kawasaki	4	1	3	1	6	Ret	1	WD	3	130
3	(France) Florian Marino	Yamaha	2	**3**	Ret	2	5	4	**2**	2	20	120
4	(Italy) Roberto Tamburini	Yamaha	3	9	2	4	DNS	3	6	**4**	5	106
5	(France) Jérémy Guarnoni	Kawasaki	6	5	19	8	7	6	5	1	8	92
6	(Australia) Mike Jones	Ducati	9	DNS	7	10	8	2	4	6	4	86
7	(Italy) Marco Faccani	BMW	5	DNS	4	11	1	12	Ret	11	9	70
8	(Chile) Maximilian Scheib	Aprilia	Ret	7	Ret	3	3	Ret	3	9	11	69
9	(Ukraine) Illia Mykhalchyk	Kawasaki	8	6	Ret	6	9	Ret	Ret	5	2	66
10	(Italy) Luca Vitali	Aprilia	7	10	Ret	9	4	7	8	8	12	64
11	(Switzerland) Sébastien Suchet	BMW	13	8	6	7	DNS	8	7	7	15	57
12	(Italy) Federico Sandi	BMW	Ret	11	DSQ	5	Ret	**5**	Ret	3	7	52
13	(Germany) Markus Reiterberger	BMW									**1**	25
14	(Germany) Julian Puffe	BMW	14	14	11	17	18	9	11	13	16	24
15	(Germany) Marvin Fritz	Yamaha	10	DNS			11	10		12	14	23
16	(Denmark) Alex Schacht	Ducati	24	20	8	15	10	11	18	15	21	21
17	(Italy) Matteo Ferrari	Kawasaki			5		12					15
18	(Netherlands) Danny de Boer	BMW		4								13
19	(Italy) Federico D'Annunzio	BMW	20	26	13		19	15	12	19	13	11
20	(Germany) Toni Finsterbusch	Kawasaki	18	16	Ret		Ret	13	10	23	Ret	9
21	(Italy) Emanuele Pusceddu	Suzuki	26	24	16							9
21	(Italy) Emanuele Pusceddu	Kawasaki				14	13	14	22	14	23	9
22	(Italy) Luca Marconi	Yamaha	12	12	Ret							8
23	(Italy) Federico Sanchioni	BMW	19	22	9	Ret	WD	20				7
24	(Italy) Riccardo Cecchini	Kawasaki	25	Ret	12	18	17					7
24	(Italy) Riccardo Cecchini	BMW						24	13	21	WD	7
25	(Italy) Kevin Calia	Suzuki	16	13	18	12	DNS					7
26	(Switzerland) Eric Vionnet	BMW			10		DNS	23	17	16	28	6
27	(Italy) Andrea Mantovani	Aprilia									10	6
28	(Netherlands) Wayne Tessels	Kawasaki	11	23	DNS	Ret	DNS	18	15	18	18	6
29	(Italy) Kevin Manfredi	Kawasaki	Ret	Ret	Ret	13	Ret					3
30	(Australia) Glenn Scott	Kawasaki	22	25	14	16	15	17	16	Ret	DNS	3
31	(Italy) Fabio Marchionni	Yamaha					14					2
32	(Spain) Xavier Pinsach	Kawasaki	17	21			16	16	14	17	19	2
33	(Italy) Andrea Tucci	Yamaha	15	17	WD							1
34	(Germany) Marc Moser	Kawasaki	21	15	Ret	19	20	19	20	Ret	25	1
35	(Switzerland) Leu Bryan	Yamaha	Ret	27	15	Ret	DNS					1
	(France) Maxime Cudeville	Kawasaki	28	28	17	21	21	22	21	25	29	0
	(Italy) Gabriele Ruiu	Suzuki					DNS					0
	(Italy) Gabriele Ruiu	Yamaha							Ret	22	17	0
	(Italy) Alex Bernardi	BMW	23	18	Ret	20						0
	(Italy) Alex Bernardi	Yamaha					DNS	21	19	24	27	0
	(Netherlands) Pepijn Bijsterbosch	Yamaha		19								0
	(France) Maxime Bonnot	BMW								20		0
	(Finland) Eeki Kuparinen	Kawasaki									22	0
	(Spain) Alejandro Medina	Yamaha									24	0
	(Chile) Vicente Kruger	BMW									26	0
	(Italy) Marco Sbaiz	BMW	27	29								0
	(Italy) Alessio Terziani	Yamaha								DNQ	30	0
	(Spain) Lucas de Ulacia	Kawasaki									31	0
	(Italy) Alessandro Nocco	Kawasaki	DNS	Ret	Ret	DNS						0
	(Italy) Alessandro Andreozzi	Yamaha					Ret					0
	(South Africa) Daryn Upton	Kawasaki					Ret					0
	(Italy) Luca Salvadori	Yamaha					Ret					0
	(Italy) Walter Sulis	Yamaha						Ret				0
	(Germany) Florian Alt	Yamaha									Ret	0
	(Italy) Stefano Fugardi	Yamaha					DNS					
	(Japan) Naomichi Uramoto	Suzuki									DNS	
	(United States) Kyle Wyman	Kawasaki				WD						
Pos.	Rider	Bike	ARA (Spain)	ASS (Netherlands)	IMO (Italy)	DON (United Kingdom)	MIS (Italy)	LAU (Germany)	ALG (Portugal)	MAG (France)	JER (Spain)	Pts

Colour	Result
Gold	Winner
Silver	Second place
Bronze	Third place
Green	Points classification
Blue	Non-points classification
Blue	Non-classified finish (NC)
Purple	Retired, not classified (Ret)
Red	Did not qualify (DNQ)
Red	Did not pre-qualify (DNPQ)
Black	Disqualified (DSQ)
White	Did not start (DNS)
White	Withdrew (WD)
White	Race cancelled (C)
Blank	Did not practice (DNP)
Blank	Did not arrive (DNA)
Blank	Excluded (EX)

**Bold** – Pole position
Italics – Fastest lap

=== Teams' championship ===
Pos.	Team	Bike No.	ARA (Spain)	ASS (Netherlands)	IMO (Italy)	DON (United Kingdom)	MIS (Italy)	LAU (Germany)	POR (Portugal)	MAG (France)	JER (Spain)	Pts.
1	(Italy) PATA Yamaha Official STK 1000 Team	21	2	**3**	Ret	2	5	4	**2**	2	20	226
1	(Italy) PATA Yamaha Official STK 1000 Team	2	3	9	2	4	DNS	3	6	**4**	5	226
2	(Italy) Aruba.it Racing – Junior Team	12	**1**	2	**1**	**Ret**	**2**	1	9	10	6	224
2	(Italy) Aruba.it Racing – Junior Team	57	9	DNS	7	10	8	2	4	6	4	224
3	(Italy) Nuova M2 Racing	71	Ret	7	Ret	3	3	Ret	3	9	11	139
3	(Italy) Nuova M2 Racing	70	7	10	Ret	9	4	7	8	8	12	139
3	(Italy) Nuova M2 Racing	9									10	139
4	(Italy) Kawasaki Puccetti Racing	54	4	1	3	1	6	Ret	1	WD	3	130
5	(Switzerland) Berclaz Racing Team SA	3	13	8	6	7	DNS	8	7	7	15	109
5	(Switzerland) Berclaz Racing Team SA	23	Ret	11	DSQ	5	Ret	**5**	Ret	3	7	109
6	(Italy) Pedercini Racing Kawasaki	11	6	5	19	8	7	6	5	1	8	92
7	(Italy) Althea BMW Racing Team	5	5	DNS	4	11	1	12	Ret	11	9	70
8	(Germany) TripleM Racing	55	8	6	Ret	6	9	Ret	Ret	5	2	67
8	(Germany) TripleM Racing	32	21	15	Ret	19	20	19	20	Ret	25	67
9	(Belgium) Van Zon Remeha (Belgium) Van Zon Remeha BMW	28									**1**	38
9	(Belgium) Van Zon Remeha (Belgium) Van Zon Remeha BMW	4		4								38
10	(Italy) Althea MF84	19	14	14	11	17	18	9	11	13	16	24
11	(Germany) Bayer-Bikerbox Yamahichi	7	10	DNS			11	10		12	14	23
12	(Netherlands) EAB Schacht Racing Team	59	24	20	8	15	10	11	18	15	21	21
13	(Netherlands) Agro On-Benjan-Kawasaki	90	18	16	Ret		Ret	13	10	23	Ret	18
13	(Netherlands) Agro On-Benjan-Kawasaki	77	11	23	DNS	Ret	DNS	18	15	18	18	18
13	(Netherlands) Agro On-Benjan-Kawasaki	68	22	25	14	16	15	17	16	Ret	DNS	18
13	(Netherlands) Agro On-Benjan-Kawasaki	33				WD						18
14	(Italy) DMR Racing Team	31			5							11
15	(Italy) FDA Racing Team	41	20	26	13		19	15	12	19	13	11
16	(Italy) D.K.Racing	6				14	13	14	22	14	23	9
16	(Italy) D.K.Racing	26	27	29								9
17	(Italy) TheBlackSheep Team	87	12	12	Ret							8
17	(Italy) TheBlackSheep Team	81					DNS	21	19	24	27	8
18	(Italy) Clasitaly	13	19	22	9	Ret	WD	20				7
19	(Italy) DDM by BWG_Bike & Motor RT_Grimaldi	18	25	Ret	12	18	17					7
19	(Italy) DDM by BWG_Bike & Motor RT_Grimaldi	14	Ret	Ret	Ret	13	Ret					7
19	(Italy) DDM by BWG_Bike & Motor RT_Grimaldi	8	DNS	Ret	Ret	DNS						7
19	(Italy) DDM by BWG_Bike & Motor RT_Grimaldi	66					Ret					7
20	(Italy) RSV Phoenix Suzuki (Italy) Phoenix Suzuki Racing	74	16	13	18	12	DNS					7
20	(Italy) RSV Phoenix Suzuki (Italy) Phoenix Suzuki Racing	6	26	24	16							7
20	(Italy) RSV Phoenix Suzuki (Italy) Phoenix Suzuki Racing	16					DNS					7
21	(Italy) 2R Road Racing	31					12					7
21	(Italy) 2R Road Racing	18						24	13	21	WD	7
21	(Italy) 2R Road Racing	81	23	18	Ret	20						7
21	(Italy) 2R Road Racing	88									26	7
22	(Switzerland) Motos Vionnet	51			10		DNS	23	17	16	28	6
23	(Italy) Speed Action by Andreozzi R.C.	155					14					2
23	(Italy) Speed Action by Andreozzi R.C.	121					Ret					2
24	(Spain) ETG Racing	34	17	21			16	16	14	17	19	2
25	(Italy) Tucci Racing Team	44	15	17	WD							1
25	(Italy) Tucci Racing Team	61								DNQ	30	1
25	(Italy) Tucci Racing Team	123					Ret					1
26	(Italy) Team Trasimeno	92	Ret	27	15	Ret	DNS					1
26	(Italy) Team Trasimeno	16							Ret	22	17	1
26	(Italy) Team Trasimeno	25						Ret				1
	(France) Flemmbo Leader Team	46	28	28	17	21	21	22	21	25	29	0
	(Netherlands) Team SWPN	50		19								0
	(France) TECMAS	10								20		0
	(Finland) Motomarket Racing	91									22	0
	(Spain) Cardoso School Racing	15									24	0
	(Spain) kawasaki Palmento PL Racing	17									31	0
	(Germany) Team Yamaha MGM	36									Ret	0
	(Italy) FM Moto Racing	22					DNS					
	(Japan) JEG . Kagayama	94									DNS	
Pos.	Team	Bike No.	ARA (Spain)	ASS (Netherlands)	IMO (Italy)	DON (United Kingdom)	MIS (Italy)	LAU (Germany)	POR (Portugal)	MAG (France)	JER (Spain)	Pts.

=== Manufacturers' championship ===
Pos.	Manufacturer	ARA (Spain)	ASS (Netherlands)	IMO (Italy)	DON (United Kingdom)	MIS (Italy)	LAU (Germany)	POR (Portugal)	MAG (France)	JER (Spain)	Pts
1	(Japan) Kawasaki	4	1	3	1	6	6	1	1	2	169
2	(Italy) Ducati	1	2	1	10	2	1	4	6	4	157
3	(Japan) Yamaha	2	3	2	2	5	3	2	2	5	154
4	(Germany) BMW	5	4	4	5	1	5	7	3	1	134
5	(Italy) Aprilia	7	7	Ret	3	3	7	3	8	10	89
6	(Japan) Suzuki	16	13	16	12	DNS				DNS	7
Pos.	Manufacturer	ARA (Spain)	ASS (Netherlands)	IMO (Italy)	DON (United Kingdom)	MIS (Italy)	LAU (Germany)	POR (Portugal)	MAG (France)	JER (Spain)	Pts
