= Luca Salvadori =

Italian motorcycle racer and YouTuber

- Nationality: Italian
- Born: 2 March 1992; Milan, Italy
- Died: 14 September 2024 (aged 32); Leipzig, Germany
- Bike number: 23
Motorcycle racing career statistics
MotoE World Championship
Active years	2023
Manufacturers	Ducati
Championships	0
2023 championship position	17th (22 pts)
Starts / Wins / Podiums / Poles / F. laps / Points; 10 / 0 / 0 / 0 / 0 / 22
Supersport World Championship
Active years	2013
Manufacturers	Yamaha
Championships	0
2013 championship position	NC (0 pts)
Starts / Wins / Podiums / Poles / F. laps / Points; 2 / 0 / 0 / 0 / 0 / 0

Championship titles
- Italian Hillclimb Open 1000 Championship (2024); IRRC National Trophy 1000 (2024)

YouTube information
- Channel: Luca Salvadori
- Genre: Racing
- Subscribers: 641 thousand
- Views: 230.4 million
- Last updated: 2 October 2026

Luca Maurizio Salvadori (2 March 1992 – 14 September 2024) was an Italian Grand Prix motorcycle racer, who competed in the MotoE World Championship for Prettl Pramac MotoE during the 2023 season. His father Maurizio, is the founder of Trident Motorsport.

Salvadori died on the 14th of September 2024, in the Leipzig hospital, following injuries sustained in an accident on the Frohburg street circuit.

== Career ==
Salvadori began racing nationally in 2009 in the Italian CIV Championship.

In 2015, Salvadori moved up to the FIM Superstock 1000 Cup, becoming a full-time rider with Althea Racing, riding a Ducati Panigale and finishing sixteenth in the championship with sixteen points.

Salvadori began 2016 with GP Project aboard an Aprilia RSV4, competing in both the FIM Cup and the Italian Superbike championship. He finished thirteenth in the Italian Championship and twentieth in the Superstock Championship.

In 2018, Salvadori competed as a full-time rider for the Berclaz Racing Team, riding a BMW S1000RR. His teammate was Roberto Tamburini. He finished in the top fifteen of all races except Brno, finishing tenth in the championship.

In 2018 and 2019, Salvadori also took part in the Monza Rally Show with co-driver Alberto Vagaggini.

In 2023, at the age of 31, Salvadori made his debut in Grand Prix motorcycle racing, as he was hired by Pramac Racing to compete in the MotoE World Championship aboard the Ducati V21L, with Tito Rabat as his teammate. Physical problems prevented him from completing the season, and he was replaced by Óscar Gutiérrez and Andrea Migno. The points he earned in the first half of the season allowed him to finish seventeenth. Also in 2023, he competed in the second round of the Italian Supersport championship at Misano, but failed to score any points.

In 2024, Salvadori participated in the Italian Hillclimb Championship, winning the title in the 1000 Open class with one race to spare, in July.

== Death ==
Salvadori died on the evening of September 14, 2024, at the age of 32, in the Leipzig hospital, following injuries sustained in an accident that afternoon on the Frohburg road circuit during the IRRC Superbike championship.

On the day of his death, the Team Pistard riders, his direct rivals in the National Trophy 1000, decided not to participate in the final two races of the season, allowing Salvadori to become champion of the 2024 National Trophy 1000, which was made official on September 29.

Salvadori's funeral was held on September 25 at the Basilica of Santa Maria delle Grazie in Milan, attended by thousands of people.

== Youtube channel ==
On April 27, 2017, Salvadori launched his own YouTube channel, which grew to hundreds of videos and over half a million subscribers. His videos covered various topics related to motorsports and motorcycling.

== Career statistics ==
=== European Superstock 600 ===
==== Races by year ====
(key) (Races in bold indicate pole position, races in italics indicate fastest lap)

Year	Bike	1	2	3	4	5	6	7	8	9	10	Pos	Pts
2011	Honda	NED; 17	ITA; Ret	MIS; Ret	SPA; 17	CZE	GBR	GER	IMO	FRA	POR	NC	0
2013	Kawasaki	ARA	ASS; 14	**MNZ**; 2	POR; 11	IMO; 6	SIL1; 7	SIL2; 5	NÜR; Ret	MAG; DNS	JER; Ret	9th	57

=== Supersport World Championship ===
==== Races by year ====
(key) (Races in bold indicate pole position; races in italics indicate fastest lap)

Year	Bike	1	2	3	4	5	6	7	8	9	10	11	12	13	Pos	Pts
2013	Honda	AUS; Ret	SPA; Ret	NED	ITA	GBR	POR	ITA	RUS	GBR	GER	TUR	FRA	SPA	NC	0

=== Superstock 1000 Cup ===
==== Races by year ====
(key) (Races in bold indicate pole position) (Races in italics indicate fastest lap)

Year	Bike	1	2	3	4	5	6	7	8	Pos	Pts
2015	Ducati	ARA; 15	NED; Ret	IMO; 8	DON; 9	ALG; 18	MIS; DNS	JER	MAG	16th	16
2016	Aprilia	ARA; 16	NED; 6	IMO; Ret	DON; 18	MIS				20th	20
2016	Yamaha						LAU; 6	MAG; Ret	JER; DNS	20th	20

=== European Superstock 1000 Championship ===
==== Races by year ====
(key) (Races in bold indicate pole position) (Races in italics indicate fastest lap)

Year	Bike	1	2	3	4	5	6	7	8	9	Pos	Pts
2017	Yamaha	ARA	NED	IMO	DON	MIS; Ret	LAU	ALG	MAG	JER	NC	0
2018	BMW	ARA; 8	NED; 11	IMO; 12	DON; 13	BRN; Ret	MIS; 11	ALG; 7	MAG; 9		10th	41

=== Grand Prix motorcycle racing ===
==== By season ====
Season	Class	Motorcycle	Team	Race	Win	Podium	Pole	FLap	Pts	Plcd
2023	MotoE	Ducati V21L	Prettl Pramac MotoE	10	0	0	0	0	22	17th
Total				**10**	**0**	**0**	**0**	**0**	**22**	

==== By class ====
Class	Seasons	1st GP	1st Pod	1st Win	Race	Win	Podiums	Pole	FLap	Pts	WChmp
MotoE	2022–present	2023 France			10	0	0	0	0	22	0
Total	2022–present				**10**	**0**	**0**	**0**	**0**	**22**	**0**

==== Races by year ====
(key) (Races in bold indicate pole position; races in italics indicate fastest lap)

Year	Class	Bike	1	2	3	4	5	6	7	8	9	10	11	12	13	14	15	16	Pos	Pts
2023	MotoE	Ducati	FRA1; 10	FRA2; 13	ITA1; 13	ITA2; 11	GER1; 16	GER2; 16	NED1; 16	NED2; Ret	GBR1; Ret	GBR2; 11	AUT1	AUT2	CAT1	CAT2	RSM1	RSM2	17th	22
