= 2019 Superbike World Championship =

2019 Superbike World Championship
Previous:	2018	Next:	2020
Support series: Supersport World Championship; Supersport 300 World Championship

The 2019 Superbike World Championship (known as 2019 MOTUL FIM Superbike World Championship for sponsorship reasons) was the 32nd season of the Superbike World Championship.

== Competition format ==
A new race format was introduced for the 2019 season. As in 2018, two normal length races (Race 1 and Race 2) were held – one each on Saturday and Sunday (Friday and Saturday in Qatar). A third race, a ten lap sprint named the Superpole Race, was held on the final morning of the weekend before Race 2. The starting grids for Race 1 and the Superpole Race were determined by a single 25-minute Superpole Qualifying session. The grid for Race 2 featured the top nine riders in the Superpole Race in the order in which they finished followed by the remaining riders sorted by their Superpole Qualifying times.

== Race calendar and results ==
A provisional 13-event calendar (of which one race was unconfirmed) was announced on 13 November 2018, with one round change from 2018 as the Czech round at Brno was replaced by a round at Jerez, to be held in June. As well as this, the round at Donington Park was moved from May to July, with the Misano round moving forward into June to accommodate this. On 19 December 2018, the thirteenth round was confirmed at WeatherTech Raceway Laguna Seca, having initially been dropped for 2019.

2019 Superbike World Championship Calendar
Round			Circuit	Date	Superpole	Fastest lap	Winning rider	Winning team
1	R1	(Australia) Australian	Phillip Island Grand Prix Circuit	23 February	(United Kingdom) Jonathan Rea	(Spain) Álvaro Bautista	(Spain) Álvaro Bautista	Aruba.it Racing – Ducati
1	SR	(Australia) Australian	Phillip Island Grand Prix Circuit	24 February	(United Kingdom) Jonathan Rea	(United Kingdom) Jonathan Rea	(Spain) Álvaro Bautista	Aruba.it Racing – Ducati
1	R2	(Australia) Australian	Phillip Island Grand Prix Circuit	24 February		(Spain) Álvaro Bautista	(Spain) Álvaro Bautista	Aruba.it Racing – Ducati
2	R1	(Thailand) Thai	Chang International Circuit	16 March	(Spain) Álvaro Bautista	(Spain) Álvaro Bautista	(Spain) Álvaro Bautista	Aruba.it Racing – Ducati
2	SR	(Thailand) Thai	Chang International Circuit	17 March	(Spain) Álvaro Bautista	(United Kingdom) Jonathan Rea	(Spain) Álvaro Bautista	Aruba.it Racing – Ducati
2	R2	(Thailand) Thai	Chang International Circuit	17 March		(Spain) Álvaro Bautista	(Spain) Álvaro Bautista	Aruba.it Racing – Ducati
3	R1	(Spain) Aragón	Motorland Aragón	6 April	(Spain) Álvaro Bautista	(Spain) Álvaro Bautista	(Spain) Álvaro Bautista	Aruba.it Racing – Ducati
3	SR	(Spain) Aragón	Motorland Aragón	7 April	(Spain) Álvaro Bautista	(Spain) Álvaro Bautista	(Spain) Álvaro Bautista	Aruba.it Racing – Ducati
3	R2	(Spain) Aragón	Motorland Aragón	7 April		(Spain) Álvaro Bautista	(Spain) Álvaro Bautista	Aruba.it Racing – Ducati
4	R1	(Netherlands) Dutch	TT Circuit Assen	14 April	(Spain) Álvaro Bautista	(Spain) Álvaro Bautista	(Spain) Álvaro Bautista	Aruba.it Racing – Ducati
4	SR	(Netherlands) Dutch	TT Circuit Assen	14 April	(Spain) Álvaro Bautista	Race cancelled (Note: Race 1 was scheduled to be run on Saturday 13 April but was postponed to the following day due to snow. As a result, the Superpole Race, to be held on Sunday 14 April, was canceled. The Superpole qualifying session set the grid for both races.)		
4	R2	(Netherlands) Dutch	TT Circuit Assen	14 April	(Spain) Álvaro Bautista	(Spain) Álvaro Bautista	(Spain) Álvaro Bautista	Aruba.it Racing – Ducati
5	R1	(Italy) Italian	Autodromo Enzo e Dino Ferrari	11 May	(United Kingdom) Chaz Davies	(United Kingdom) Jonathan Rea	(United Kingdom) Jonathan Rea	Kawasaki Racing Team WorldSBK
5	SR	(Italy) Italian	Autodromo Enzo e Dino Ferrari	12 May	(United Kingdom) Chaz Davies	(United Kingdom) Chaz Davies	(United Kingdom) Jonathan Rea	Kawasaki Racing Team WorldSBK
5	R2	(Italy) Italian	Autodromo Enzo e Dino Ferrari	12 May	Race cancelled (Note: Race 2 session was cancelled due to torrential rain.)			
6	R1	(Spain) Spanish	Circuito de Jerez	8 June	(United Kingdom) Jonathan Rea	(Spain) Álvaro Bautista	(Spain) Álvaro Bautista	Aruba.it Racing – Ducati
6	SR	(Spain) Spanish	Circuito de Jerez	9 June	(United Kingdom) Jonathan Rea	(Spain) Álvaro Bautista	(Spain) Álvaro Bautista	Aruba.it Racing – Ducati
6	R2	(Spain) Spanish	Circuito de Jerez	9 June		(United Kingdom) Jonathan Rea	(Netherlands) Michael van der Mark	Pata Yamaha WorldSBK Team
7	R1	(Italy) Riviera di Rimini	Misano World Circuit Marco Simoncelli	22 June	(United Kingdom) Jonathan Rea	(United Kingdom) Jonathan Rea	(United Kingdom) Jonathan Rea	Kawasaki Racing Team WorldSBK
7	SR	(Italy) Riviera di Rimini	Misano World Circuit Marco Simoncelli	23 June	(United Kingdom) Jonathan Rea	(Spain) Álvaro Bautista	(Spain) Álvaro Bautista	Aruba.it Racing – Ducati
7	R2	(Italy) Riviera di Rimini	Misano World Circuit Marco Simoncelli	23 June		(Turkey) Toprak Razgatlıoğlu	(United Kingdom) Jonathan Rea	Kawasaki Racing Team WorldSBK
8	R1	(United Kingdom) UK	Donington Park	6 July	(United Kingdom) Tom Sykes	(United Kingdom) Tom Sykes	(United Kingdom) Jonathan Rea	Kawasaki Racing Team WorldSBK
8	SR	(United Kingdom) UK	Donington Park	7 July	(United Kingdom) Tom Sykes	(United Kingdom) Jonathan Rea	(United Kingdom) Jonathan Rea	Kawasaki Racing Team WorldSBK
8	R2	(United Kingdom) UK	Donington Park	7 July		(Turkey) Toprak Razgatlıoğlu	(United Kingdom) Jonathan Rea	Kawasaki Racing Team WorldSBK
9	R1	(United States) US	WeatherTech Raceway Laguna Seca	13 July	(United Kingdom) Jonathan Rea	(Spain) Álvaro Bautista	(United Kingdom) Jonathan Rea	Kawasaki Racing Team WorldSBK
9	SR	(United States) US	WeatherTech Raceway Laguna Seca	14 July	(United Kingdom) Jonathan Rea	(United Kingdom) Jonathan Rea	(United Kingdom) Jonathan Rea	Kawasaki Racing Team WorldSBK
9	R2	(United States) US	WeatherTech Raceway Laguna Seca	14 July		(United Kingdom) Chaz Davies	(United Kingdom) Chaz Davies	Aruba.it Racing – Ducati
10	R1	(Portugal) Portuguese	Algarve International Circuit	7 September	(United Kingdom) Jonathan Rea	(United Kingdom) Jonathan Rea	(United Kingdom) Jonathan Rea	Kawasaki Racing Team WorldSBK
10	SR	(Portugal) Portuguese	Algarve International Circuit	8 September	(United Kingdom) Jonathan Rea	(United Kingdom) Jonathan Rea	(United Kingdom) Jonathan Rea	Kawasaki Racing Team WorldSBK
10	R2	(Portugal) Portuguese	Algarve International Circuit	8 September		(Spain) Álvaro Bautista	(Spain) Álvaro Bautista	Aruba.it Racing – Ducati
11	R1	(France) French	Circuit de Nevers Magny-Cours	28 September	(United Kingdom) Jonathan Rea	(United Kingdom) Jonathan Rea	(Turkey) Toprak Razgatlıoğlu	Turkish Puccetti Racing
11	SR	(France) French	Circuit de Nevers Magny-Cours	29 September	(United Kingdom) Jonathan Rea	(Turkey) Toprak Razgatlıoğlu	(Turkey) Toprak Razgatlıoğlu	Turkish Puccetti Racing
11	R2	(France) French	Circuit de Nevers Magny-Cours	29 September		(United Kingdom) Alex Lowes	(United Kingdom) Jonathan Rea	Kawasaki Racing Team WorldSBK
12	R1	(Argentina) Argentinean	Circuito San Juan Villicum	12 October	(Spain) Álvaro Bautista	(Spain) Álvaro Bautista	(Spain) Álvaro Bautista	Aruba.it Racing – Ducati
12	SR	(Argentina) Argentinean	Circuito San Juan Villicum	13 October	(Spain) Álvaro Bautista	(United Kingdom) Jonathan Rea	(United Kingdom) Jonathan Rea	Kawasaki Racing Team WorldSBK
12	R2	(Argentina) Argentinean	Circuito San Juan Villicum	13 October		(United Kingdom) Chaz Davies	(United Kingdom) Jonathan Rea	Kawasaki Racing Team WorldSBK
13	R1	Qatar	Losail International Circuit	25 October	(United Kingdom) Jonathan Rea	(United Kingdom) Alex Lowes	(United Kingdom) Jonathan Rea	Kawasaki Racing Team WorldSBK
13	SR	Qatar	Losail International Circuit	26 October	(United Kingdom) Jonathan Rea	(United Kingdom) Jonathan Rea	(United Kingdom) Jonathan Rea	Kawasaki Racing Team WorldSBK
13	R2	Qatar	Losail International Circuit	26 October		(United Kingdom) Chaz Davies	(United Kingdom) Jonathan Rea	Kawasaki Racing Team WorldSBK

== Entry list ==
An 18-rider provisional permanent entry list was released by Dorna Sports on 11 January 2019.

2019 entry list
Team	Constructor	Motorcycle	No.	Rider	Rounds
(Japan) Kawasaki Racing Team WorldSBK	Kawasaki	Kawasaki Ninja ZX-10RR	1	(United Kingdom) Jonathan Rea	All
(Japan) Kawasaki Racing Team WorldSBK	Kawasaki	Kawasaki Ninja ZX-10RR	91	(United Kingdom) Leon Haslam	All
(Japan) Moriwaki Althea Honda Team	Honda	Honda CBR1000RR	2	(United Kingdom) Leon Camier	1–5, 11–13
(Japan) Moriwaki Althea Honda Team	Honda	Honda CBR1000RR	13	(Japan) Takumi Takahashi	10
(Japan) Moriwaki Althea Honda Team	Honda	Honda CBR1000RR	23	(Japan) Ryuichi Kiyonari	All
(Japan) Moriwaki Althea Honda Team	Honda	Honda CBR1000RR	72	(Japan) Yuki Takahashi	6–7
(Italy) ARUBA.IT Racing - Ducati	Ducati	Ducati Panigale V4 R	7	(United Kingdom) Chaz Davies	All
(Italy) ARUBA.IT Racing - Ducati	Ducati	Ducati Panigale V4 R	19	(Spain) Álvaro Bautista	All
(Austria) iXS Racing powered by YART	Yamaha	Yamaha YZF-R1	9	(Switzerland) Dominic Schmitter	7, 13
(Germany) BMW Motorrad WorldSBK Team	BMW	BMW S1000RR	10	(United Kingdom) Peter Hickman	8
(Germany) BMW Motorrad WorldSBK Team	BMW	BMW S1000RR	28	(Germany) Markus Reiterberger	1–7, 9–13
(Germany) BMW Motorrad WorldSBK Team	BMW	BMW S1000RR	66	(United Kingdom) Tom Sykes	All
(Italy) GRT Yamaha WorldSBK	Yamaha	Yamaha YZF-R1	11	(Germany) Sandro Cortese	All
(Italy) GRT Yamaha WorldSBK	Yamaha	Yamaha YZF-R1	33	(Italy) Marco Melandri	All
(Australia) Penrite Honda Racing	Honda	Honda CBR1000RR	17	(Australia) Troy Herfoss	1
(Switzerland) Brixx Performance	Ducati	Ducati Panigale V4 R	20	(France) Sylvain Barrier	10–11
(Italy) BARNI Racing Team	Ducati	Ducati Panigale V4 R	21	(Italy) Michael Ruben Rinaldi	All
(Italy) BARNI Racing Team	Ducati	Ducati Panigale V4 R	51	(Italy) Michele Pirro	7
(Japan) Pata Yamaha WorldSBK Team	Yamaha	Yamaha YZF-R1	22	(United Kingdom) Alex Lowes	All
(Japan) Pata Yamaha WorldSBK Team	Yamaha	Yamaha YZF-R1	60	(Netherlands) Michael van der Mark	All
(Spain) Orelac Racing VerdNatura	Kawasaki	Kawasaki Ninja ZX-10RR	36	(Argentina) Leandro Mercado	1–3, 6–13
(Spain) Orelac Racing VerdNatura	Kawasaki	Kawasaki Ninja ZX-10RR	80	(Spain) Héctor Barberá	4–5
(Italy) Team GoEleven	Ducati	Ducati Panigale V4 R	46	(United Kingdom) Tommy Bridewell	5–6 (Note: Eugene Laverty competed in the first Friday practice session during round 5, before being replaced by Tommy Bridewell.)
(Italy) Team GoEleven	Ducati	Ducati Panigale V4 R	50	(Republic of Ireland) Eugene Laverty	1–5, 8–13
(Italy) Team GoEleven	Ducati	Ducati Panigale V4 R	87	(Italy) Lorenzo Zanetti	7
(Italy) Althea MIE Racing Team	Honda	Honda CBR1000RR	52	(Italy) Alessandro Delbianco	All
(Italy) Turkish Puccetti Racing	Kawasaki	Kawasaki Ninja ZX-10RR	54	(Turkey) Toprak Razgatlıoğlu	All
(Netherlands) Ten Kate Racing – Yamaha	Yamaha	Yamaha YZF-R1	76	(France) Loris Baz	6–13
(Italy) Team Pedercini Racing by Global Service Solutions	Kawasaki	Kawasaki Ninja ZX-10RR	81	(Spain) Jordi Torres	All
(Italy) Motocorsa Racing	Ducati	Ducati Panigale V4 R	87	(Italy) Lorenzo Zanetti	5
(Italy) Motocorsa Racing	Ducati	Ducati Panigale V4 R	97	(Italy) Samuele Cavalieri	7
(United States) Attack Performance Estenson Yamaha	Yamaha	Yamaha YZF-R1	95	(United States) J. D. Beach	9
Kawasaki Thailand Racing Team	Kawasaki	Kawasaki Ninja ZX-10RR	99	(Thailand) Thitipong Warokorn	2

Key
Regular rider
Wildcard rider
Replacement rider

- All entries used Pirelli tyres.

== Championship standings ==
Points were awarded as follows:

Race 1 and Race 2

Position	**1st**	**2nd**	**3rd**	**4th**	**5th**	**6th**	**7th**	**8th**	**9th**	**10th**	**11th**	**12th**	**13th**	**14th**	**15th**
Points	25	20	16	13	11	10	9	8	7	6	5	4	3	2	1

Superpole Race

Position	**1st**	**2nd**	**3rd**	**4th**	**5th**	**6th**	**7th**	**8th**	**9th**
Points	12	9	7	6	5	4	3	2	1

=== Riders' championship ===
Pos.	Rider	Bike	PHI (Australia)			CHA (Thailand)			ARA (Spain)			ASS (Netherlands)			IMO (Italy)			JER (Spain)			MIS (Italy)			DON (United Kingdom)			LAG (United States)			POR (Portugal)			MAG (France)			VIL (Argentina)			LOS (Qatar)			Pts
Pos.	Rider	Bike	R1	SR	R2	R1	SR	R2	R1	SR	R2	R1	SR	R2	R1	SR	R2	R1	SR	R2	R1	SR	R2	R1	SR	R2	R1	SR	R2	R1	SR	R2	R1	SR	R2	R1	SR	R2	R1	SR	R2	Pts
1	(United Kingdom) Jonathan Rea	Kawasaki	**2**	**2**	2	2	2	2	2	2	2	2	C	3	1	1	C	**4**	**4**	2	**1**	**5**	1	1	1	1	**1**	**1**	2	**1**	**1**	2	**2**	**2**	1	2	1	1	**1**	**1**	1	663
2	(Spain) Álvaro Bautista	Ducati	1	1	1	**1**	**1**	1	**1**	**1**	1	**1**	C	**1**	2	3	C	1	1	NC	3	1	14	Ret	4	3	17	DNS	Ret	4	2	1	5	5	Ret	**1**	**2**	5	4	2	3	498
3	(United Kingdom) Alex Lowes	Yamaha	4	4	5	3	3	3	4	3	5	4	C	4	7	5	C	16	Ret	14	Ret	2	4	5	6	4	5	6	4	7	3	4	6	6	3	5	5	6	3	3	4	341
4	(Netherlands) Michael van der Mark	Yamaha	5	5	4	4	4	4	6	15	8	3	C	2	4	4	C	2	2	1	DNS	DNS	DNS	8	8	8	7	10	Ret	3	6	7	13	3	2	4	6	4	6	6	7	327
5	(Turkey) Toprak Razgatlıoğlu	Kawasaki	6	15	Ret	10	9	9	8	10	Ret	9	C	9	3	7	C	5	7	3	Ret	4	2	13	2	2	3	4	3	6	4	3	1	1	Ret	3	3	3	11	Ret	5	315
6	(United Kingdom) Chaz Davies	Ducati	10	10	7	15	8	Ret	3	4	3	7	C	5	**Ret**	**2**	C	7	10	Ret	5	17	7	10	7	9	2	2	1	2	10	16	Ret	4	4	DNS	4	2	2	5	2	294
7	(United Kingdom) Leon Haslam	Kawasaki	15	3	3	5	5	5	9	7	4	5	C	8	5	6	C	9	6	5	Ret	3	3	3	3	5	Ret	5	6	5	5	5	Ret	9	7	6	8	10	5	4	9	281
8	(United Kingdom) Tom Sykes	BMW	7	11	13	9	10	Ret	5	5	12	10	C	7	Ret	8	C	6	5	7	2	Ret	6	**2**	**Ret**	7	4	3	5	13	7	9	3	8	8	7	9	Ret	Ret	12	12	223
9	(Italy) Marco Melandri	Yamaha	3	6	6	6	6	6	12	11	11	12	C	14	6	17	C	3	3	Ret	6	6	16	14	10	10	9	16	9	9	13	8	8	12	6	DNS	15	14	12	10	17	177
10	(France) Loris Baz	Yamaha																12	Ret	9	4	12	12	4	5	6	8	7	7	16	9	6	4	7	5	DNS	Ret	12	7	7	8	138
11	(Spain) Jordi Torres	Kawasaki	11	17	14	11	13	10	10	8	7	8	C	10	11	9	C	Ret	8	8	12	11	10	Ret	9	Ret	6	8	8	11	12	11	11	15	10	8	11	9	Ret	14	13	135
12	(Germany) Sandro Cortese	Yamaha	8	7	8	7	7	7	7	9	10	13	C	11	Ret	13	C	8	9	6	7	Ret	15	Ret	Ret	13	14	11	14	8	8	10	10	11	Ret	DNS	7	15	Ret	8	10	134
13	(Italy) Michael Ruben Rinaldi	Ducati	9	8	16	8	11	8	13	Ret	9	Ret	C	15	8	15	C	10	11	4	Ret	7	5	12	11	12	10	13	10	10	11	12	14	10	17	12	14	11	13	Ret	15	122
14	(Germany) Markus Reiterberger	BMW	13	12	12	14	14	11	Ret	Ret	15	6	C	6	10	10	C	11	15	12	15	13	11				15	12	13	12	14	13	16	17	15	11	17	16	8	15	14	83
15	(Republic of Ireland) Eugene Laverty	Ducati	12	9	9	Ret	DNS	Ret	15	6	6	14	C	13	WD	WD	WD							DNS	DNS	DNS	11	14	12	Ret	15	14	9	13	12	DNS	13	7	9	9	6	81
16	(Argentina) Leandro Mercado	Kawasaki	14	Ret	11	12	12	Ret	Ret	DNS	DNS							13	13	11	10	9	Ret	6	Ret	14	12	9	11	14	16	15	12	14	11	9	10	8	Ret	11	11	80
17	(United Kingdom) Leon Camier	Honda	Ret	13	10	13	NC	DNS	11	12	13	11	C	12	DNS	DNS	C																7	16	9	DNS	12	13	10	13	16	51
18	(Italy) Alessandro Delbianco	Honda	17	Ret	Ret	17	15	13	Ret	14	Ret	Ret	C	17	15	18	C	15	16	Ret	11	Ret	Ret	9	Ret	15	13	DNS	17	18	19	20	15	19	16	10	16	Ret	15	18	Ret	29
19	(Japan) Ryuichi Kiyonari	Honda	16	14	15	Ret	Ret	12	14	13	14	15	C	Ret	14	16	C	17	17	NC	14	15	17	11	Ret	16	16	15	15	19	20	19	18	20	14	DNS	18	17	14	16	18	24
20	(Italy) Lorenzo Zanetti	Ducati													9	12	C				9	10	9																			21
21	(United Kingdom) Peter Hickman	BMW																						7	Ret	11																14
22	(United Kingdom) Tommy Bridewell	Ducati													12	11	C	14	12	10																						12
23	(Japan) Yuki Takahashi	Honda																Ret	14	13	8	14	Ret																			11
24	(Italy) Michele Pirro	Ducati																			Ret	8	8																			10
25	(Italy) Samuele Cavalieri	Ducati																			13	Ret	13																			6
26	(France) Sylvain Barrier	Ducati																												17	18	18	17	18	13							3
27	(Spain) Héctor Barberá	Kawasaki										16	C	16	13	14	C																									3
28	(Japan) Takumi Takahashi	Honda																												15	17	17										1
	(Switzerland) Dominic Schmitter	Yamaha																			Ret	16	DNS																16	17	Ret	0
	(United States) J. D. Beach	Yamaha																									Ret	DNS	16													0
	(Thailand) Thitipong Warokorn	Kawasaki				16	NC	DNS																																		0
	(Australia) Troy Herfoss	Honda	Ret	16	Ret																																					0
Pos.	Rider	Bike	PHI (Australia)			CHA (Thailand)			ARA (Spain)			ASS (Netherlands)			IMO (Italy)			JER (Spain)			MIS (Italy)			DON (United Kingdom)			LAG (United States)			POR (Portugal)			MAG (France)			VIL (Argentina)			LOS (Qatar)			Pts

Colour	Result
Gold	Winner
Silver	Second place
Bronze	Third place
Green	Points classification
Blue	Non-points classification
Blue	Non-classified finish (NC)
Purple	Retired, not classified (Ret)
Red	Did not qualify (DNQ)
Red	Did not pre-qualify (DNPQ)
Black	Disqualified (DSQ)
White	Did not start (DNS)
White	Withdrew (WD)
White	Race cancelled (C)
Blank	Did not practice (DNP)
Blank	Did not arrive (DNA)
Blank	Excluded (EX)

**Bold** – Pole position
Italics – Fastest lap

=== Manufacturers' championship ===
Pos.	Manufacturer	PHI (Australia)			CHA (Thailand)			ARA (Spain)			ASS (Netherlands)			IMO (Italy)			JER (Spain)			MIS (Italy)			DON (United Kingdom)			LAG (United States)			POR (Portugal)			MAG (France)			VIL (Argentina)			LOS (Qatar)			Pts
Pos.	Manufacturer	R1	SR	R2	R1	SR	R2	R1	SR	R2	R1	SR	R2	R1	SR	R2	R1	SR	R2	R1	SR	R2	R1	SR	R2	R1	SR	R2	R1	SR	R2	R1	SR	R2	R1	SR	R2	R1	SR	R2	Pts
1	(Japan) Kawasaki	2	2	2	2	2	2	2	2	2	2	C	3	1	1	C	4	4	2	1	3	1	1	1	1	1	1	2	1	1	2	1	1	1	2	1	1	1	1	1	673
2	(Italy) Ducati	1	1	1	1	1	1	1	1	1	1	C	1	2	2	C	1	1	4	3	1	5	10	4	3	2	2	1	2	2	1	5	4	4	1	2	2	2	2	2	623
3	(Japan) Yamaha	3	4	4	3	3	3	4	3	5	3	C	2	4	4	C	2	2	1	4	2	4	4	5	4	5	6	4	3	3	4	4	3	2	4	5	4	3	3	4	451
4	(Germany) BMW	7	11	12	9	10	11	5	5	12	6	C	6	10	8	C	6	5	7	2	13	6	2	Ret	7	4	3	5	12	7	9	3	7	8	7	9	16	8	12	12	249
5	(Japan) Honda	16	13	10	13	15	12	11	12	13	11	C	12	14	16	C	15	14	13	8	14	17	9	Ret	15	13	15	15	15	17	17	7	16	9	10	12	13	10	13	16	88
Pos.	Manufacturer	PHI (Australia)			CHA (Thailand)			ARA (Spain)			ASS (Netherlands)			IMO (Italy)			JER (Spain)			MIS (Italy)			DON (United Kingdom)			LAG (United States)			POR (Portugal)			MAG (France)			VIL (Argentina)			LOS (Qatar)			Pts
