= 2023 MotoE World Championship =

5th running of the MotoE World Championship

The 2023 MotoE World Championship (known officially as the 2023 FIM Enel MotoE World Championship for sponsorship reasons) was the fifth season of the MotoE World Championship for electric motorcycle racing and was a part of the 75th Fédération Internationale de Motocyclisme (FIM) Road Racing World Championship season.

Having run as a World Cup from 2019 until 2022, 2023 saw the start of MotoE having officially gained World Championship status.

Mattia Casadei became MotoE World Champion after winning race 1 of the San Marino round.

== Teams and riders ==
All teams used the series-specified Ducati V21L.

Team	No.	Rider	Rounds
(Germany) Dynavolt Intact GP MotoE	3	(Switzerland) Randy Krummenacher	All
(Germany) Dynavolt Intact GP MotoE	4	(Spain) Héctor Garzó	All
(Italy) Felo Gresini MotoE	11	(Italy) Matteo Ferrari	All
(Italy) Felo Gresini MotoE	72	(Italy) Alessio Finello	All
(Spain) HP Pons Los40	29	(Italy) Nicholas Spinelli	All
(Spain) HP Pons Los40	40	(Italy) Mattia Casadei	All
(Monaco) LCR E-Team	51	(Brazil) Eric Granado	2–8
(Monaco) LCR E-Team	77	(Spain) Miquel Pons	All
(Italy) Ongetta Sic58 Squadracorse	21	(Italy) Kevin Zannoni	All
(Italy) Ongetta Sic58 Squadracorse	34	(Italy) Kevin Manfredi	All
(Spain) Openbank Aspar Team	6	(Spain) María Herrera	All
(Spain) Openbank Aspar Team	81	(Spain) Jordi Torres	All
(Italy) Prettl Pramac MotoE	23	(Italy) Luca Salvadori	1–5
(Italy) Prettl Pramac MotoE	99	(Spain) Óscar Gutiérrez	6–7
(Italy) Prettl Pramac MotoE	16	(Italy) Andrea Migno	8
(Italy) Prettl Pramac MotoE	53	(Spain) Tito Rabat	All
(Malaysia) RNF MotoE Team	8	(Spain) Mika Pérez	All
(Malaysia) RNF MotoE Team	9	(Italy) Andrea Mantovani	All
(France) Tech3 E-Racing	61	(Italy) Alessandro Zaccone	All
(France) Tech3 E-Racing	78	(Japan) Hikari Okubo	All

Key
Regular rider
Replacement rider

=== Rider changes ===
- Dominique Aegerter, the 2022 MotoE World Cup Winner, left MotoE for the Superbike World Championship.
- Álex Escrig left MotoE for the Moto2 World Championship.
- Kevin Manfredi moved from Octo Pramac MotoE to Ongetta Sic58 Squadracorse.

==== Mid-season changes ====
- Eric Granado missed the opening round of the season at Le Mans due to a serious brain swelling sustained during the Barcelona round of the 2023 Superbike World Championship. He was not replaced.
- Luca Salvadori missed the Austrian, Catalan, and San Marino rounds due to having a physical problem in his back after his crash during the British round. He was replaced by Óscar Gutiérrez for the first two races, and by Andrea Migno for the San Marino round.

== Regulation changes ==
As part of the MotoGP regulations, the minimum age in the four classes participating (MotoGP, Moto2, Moto3, and MotoE) was raised to 18 years old.

Each race weekend featured free practice and qualifying on Friday, followed by two races on Saturday.

== Calendar ==
The following Grands Prix took place in 2023:

Round	Date	Grand Prix	Circuit
1	13 May	Shark Grand Prix de France	Bugatti Circuit, Le Mans
2	10 June	(Italy) Gran Premio d'Italia Oakley	Mugello Circuit, Scarperia e San Piero
3	17 June	(Germany) Liqui Moly Motorrad Grand Prix Deutschland	Sachsenring, Hohenstein-Ernstthal
4	24 June	(Netherlands) Motul TT Assen	TT Circuit Assen, Assen
5	5 August	(United Kingdom) Monster Energy British Grand Prix	Silverstone Circuit, Silverstone
6	19 August	(Austria) CryptoData Motorrad Grand Prix von Österreich	Red Bull Ring, Spielberg
7	2 September	(Catalonia) Gran Premi Monster Energy de Catalunya	Circuit de Barcelona-Catalunya, Montmeló
8	9 September	Gran Premio Red Bull di San Marino e della Riviera di Rimini	Misano World Circuit, Misano Adriatico

=== Grand Prix locations ===
Location of Grands Prix in 2023.

== Results and standings ==
=== Grands Prix ===
Round	Grand Prix	Pole position	Fastest lap	Winning rider	Winning team	Report
1	(France) French motorcycle Grand Prix	(Italy) Matteo Ferrari	(Italy) Matteo Ferrari	(Spain) Jordi Torres	(Spain) Openbank Aspar Team	Report
1	(France) French motorcycle Grand Prix	(Italy) Matteo Ferrari	(Italy) Matteo Ferrari	(Italy) Matteo Ferrari	(Italy) Felo Gresini MotoE	Report
2	(Italy) Italian motorcycle Grand Prix	(Italy) Matteo Ferrari	(Italy) Matteo Ferrari	(Italy) Andrea Mantovani	(Malaysia) RNF MotoE Team	Report
2	(Italy) Italian motorcycle Grand Prix	(Italy) Matteo Ferrari	(Brazil) Eric Granado	(Brazil) Eric Granado	(Monaco) LCR E-Team	Report
3	(Germany) German motorcycle Grand Prix	(Spain) Jordi Torres	(Spain) Héctor Garzó	(Spain) Jordi Torres	(Spain) Openbank Aspar Team	Report
3	(Germany) German motorcycle Grand Prix	(Spain) Jordi Torres	(Switzerland) Randy Krummenacher	(Spain) Héctor Garzó	(Germany) Dynavolt Intact GP MotoE	Report
4	(Netherlands) Dutch TT	(Spain) Jordi Torres (Note: Mattia Casadei, who initially set the fastest time during qualifying, was penalized for illegal tyre pressures during the second qualifying session. His lap time which led to him qualifying on pole was cancelled and he was also disqualified from Q2, leading him to start tenth on the grid. Jordi Torres, who initially finished second in Q2, was promoted to the pole position grid slot during the race and was also officially awarded the pole position statistic.)	(Spain) Jordi Torres	(Italy) Matteo Ferrari	(Italy) Felo Gresini MotoE	Report
4	(Netherlands) Dutch TT	(Spain) Jordi Torres	(Italy) Mattia Casadei	(Italy) Matteo Ferrari	(Italy) Felo Gresini MotoE	Report
5	(United Kingdom) British motorcycle Grand Prix	(Brazil) Eric Granado	(Italy) Kevin Manfredi	(Switzerland) Randy Krummenacher	(Germany) Dynavolt Intact GP MotoE	Report
5	(United Kingdom) British motorcycle Grand Prix	(Brazil) Eric Granado	(Italy) Mattia Casadei	(Italy) Mattia Casadei	(Spain) HP Pons Los40	Report
6	(Austria) Austrian motorcycle Grand Prix	(Italy) Kevin Zannoni	(Italy) Mattia Casadei	(Italy) Mattia Casadei	(Spain) HP Pons Los40	Report
6	(Austria) Austrian motorcycle Grand Prix	(Italy) Kevin Zannoni	(Italy) Mattia Casadei	(Italy) Mattia Casadei	(Spain) HP Pons Los40	Report
7	(Catalonia) Catalan motorcycle Grand Prix	(Spain) Jordi Torres	(Spain) Jordi Torres	(Italy) Andrea Mantovani	(Malaysia) RNF MotoE Team	Report
7	(Catalonia) Catalan motorcycle Grand Prix	(Spain) Jordi Torres	(Spain) Héctor Garzó	(Italy) Mattia Casadei	(Spain) HP Pons Los40	Report
8	San Marino and Rimini Riviera motorcycle Grand Prix	(Italy) Mattia Casadei	(Spain) Héctor Garzó	(Italy) Mattia Casadei	(Spain) HP Pons Los40	Report
8	San Marino and Rimini Riviera motorcycle Grand Prix	(Italy) Mattia Casadei	(Spain) Héctor Garzó	(Italy) Nicholas Spinelli	(Spain) HP Pons Los40	Report

=== Riders' standings ===
Scoring system

Points were awarded to the top fifteen finishers. A rider had to finish the race to earn points.

Position	1st	2nd	3rd	4th	5th	6th	7th	8th	9th	10th	11th	12th	13th	14th	15th
Points	25	20	16	13	11	10	9	8	7	6	5	4	3	2	1

Pos.	Rider	Team	FRA (France)		ITA (Italy)		GER (Germany)		NED (Netherlands)		GBR (United Kingdom)		AUT (Austria)		CAT (Catalonia)		RSM (San Marino)		Pts
1	(Italy) Mattia Casadei	HP Pons Los40	Ret	4	3	Ret	5	2	4	3^{F}	6	1^{F}	1^{F}	1^{F}	2	1	1^{P}	3^{P}	260
2	(Spain) Jordi Torres	Openbank Aspar Team	1	2	9	5	1^{P}	3^{P}	2^{P F}	2^{P}	5	4	5	6	7^{P F}	Ret^{P}	10	4	217
3	(Italy) Matteo Ferrari	Felo Gresini MotoE	Ret^{P F}	1^{P F}	2^{P F}	3^{P}	3	7	1	1	8	7	16	2	4	5	6	7	216
4	(Spain) Héctor Garzó	Dynavolt Intact GP MotoE	2	3	4	6	Ret^{F}	1	7	11	4	5	4	5	3	4^{F}	2^{F}	2^{F}	215
5	(Switzerland) Randy Krummenacher	Dynavolt Intact GP MotoE	3	7	5	7	2	6^{F}	3	9	1	Ret	11	7	6	9	8	11	167
6	(Italy) Nicholas Spinelli	HP Pons Los40	Ret	5	Ret	4	6	5	9	8	Ret	3	13	13	5	3	3	1	150
7	(Brazil) Eric Granado	LCR E-Team			6	1^{F}	Ret	4	6	4	3^{P}	2^{P}	2	18	12	10	14	17	139
8	(Italy) Andrea Mantovani	RNF MotoE Team	Ret	6	1	Ret	9	10	5	Ret	10	6	Ret	9	1	2	16	5	138
9	(Italy) Kevin Zannoni	Ongetta Sic58 Squadracorse	4	8	8	10	11	12	10	6	12	Ret	3^{P}	3^{P}	11	7	5	6	130
10	(Italy) Kevin Manfredi	Ongetta Sic58 Squadracorse	7	Ret	7	2	12	13	13	10	2^{F}	9	9	10	10	12	4	18	117
11	(Italy) Alessandro Zaccone	Tech3 E-Racing	8	9	11	9	4	9	12	7	Ret	Ret	7	11	9	8	7	10	104
12	(Spain) Miquel Pons	LCR E-Team	Ret	12	10	15	8	11	11	5	7	Ret	6	4	8	6	15	9	98
13	(Japan) Hikari Okubo	Tech3 E-Racing	5	10	15	12	10	8	14	12	13	8	Ret	8	13	13	9	12	79
14	(Spain) Tito Rabat	Prettl Pramac MotoE	6	16	12	13	7	14	8	Ret	11	Ret	10	14	EX	Ret	Ret	8	57
15	(Spain) Mika Pérez	RNF MotoE Team	11	14	16	8	13	15	17	14	9	10	8	15	Ret	14	11	13	53
16	(Italy) Alessio Finello	Felo Gresini MotoE	9	11	14	Ret	14	17	15	13	14	12	14	16	15	15	12	15	35
17	(Italy) Luca Salvadori	Prettl Pramac MotoE	10	13	13	11	16	16	16	Ret	Ret	11							22
18	(Spain) María Herrera	Openbank Aspar Team	12	15	17	14	15	18	18	15	15	13	15	17	16	16	13	16	17
19	(Spain) Óscar Gutiérrez	Prettl Pramac MotoE											12	12	14	11			15
20	(Italy) Andrea Migno	Prettl Pramac MotoE															NC	14	2
Pos.	Rider	Team	FRA (France)		ITA (Italy)		GER (Germany)		NED (Netherlands)		GBR (United Kingdom)		AUT (Austria)		CAT (Catalonia)		RSM (San Marino)		Pts

Race key
Colour	Result
Gold	Winner
Silver	2nd place
Bronze	3rd place
Green	Points finish
Blue	Non-points finish
Blue	Non-classified finish (NC)
Purple	Retired (Ret)
Red	Did not qualify (DNQ)
Black	Disqualified (DSQ)
White	Did not start (DNS)
White	Withdrew (WD)
White	Race cancelled (C)
Blank	Did not practice (DNP)
Blank	Excluded (EX)
Blank	Did not arrive (DNA)
Blank	Did not enter (empty cell)
Annotation	Meaning
P	Pole position
F	Fastest lap
Rider key
Colour	Meaning
Light blue	Rookie rider

=== Teams' standings ===
The teams' standings were based on results obtained by regular and substitute riders.

Pos.	Team	Bike No.	FRA (France)		ITA (Italy)		GER (Germany)		NED (Netherlands)		GBR (United Kingdom)		AUT (Austria)		CAT (Catalonia)		RSM (San Marino)		Pts
1	(Spain) HP Pons Los40	29	Ret	5	Ret	4	6	5	9	8	Ret	3	13	13	5	3	3	1	410
1	(Spain) HP Pons Los40	40	Ret	4	3	Ret	5	2	4	3^{F}	6	1^{F}	1^{F}	1^{F}	2	1	1^{P}	3^{P}	410
2	(Germany) Dynavolt Intact GP MotoE	3	3	7	5	7	2	6^{F}	3	9	1	Ret	11	7	6	9	8	11	382
2	(Germany) Dynavolt Intact GP MotoE	4	2	3	4	6	Ret^{F}	1	7	11	4	5	4	5	3	4^{F}	2^{F}	2^{F}	382
3	(Italy) Felo Gresini MotoE	11	Ret^{P F}	1^{P F}	2^{P F}	3^{P}	3	7	1	1	8	7	16	2	4	5	6	7	251
3	(Italy) Felo Gresini MotoE	72	9	11	14	Ret	14	17	15	13	14	12	14	16	15	15	12	15	251
4	(Italy) Ongetta Sic58 Squadracorse	21	4	8	8	10	11	12	10	6	12	Ret	3^{P}	3^{P}	11	7	5	6	247
4	(Italy) Ongetta Sic58 Squadracorse	34	7	Ret	7	2	12	13	13	10	2^{F}	9	9	10	10	12	4	18	247
5	(Monaco) LCR E-Team	51			6	1^{F}	Ret	4	6	4	3^{P}	2^{P}	2	18	12	10	14	17	237
5	(Monaco) LCR E-Team	77	Ret	12	10	15	8	11	11	5	7	Ret	6	4	8	6	15	9	237
6	(Spain) Openbank Aspar Team	6	12	15	17	14	15	18	18	15	15	13	15	17	16	16	13	16	234
6	(Spain) Openbank Aspar Team	81	1	2	9	5	1^{P}	3^{P}	2^{P F}	2^{P}	5	4	5	6	7^{P F}	Ret^{P}	10	4	234
7	(Malaysia) RNF MotoE Team	8	11	14	16	8	13	15	17	14	9	10	8	15	Ret	14	11	13	191
7	(Malaysia) RNF MotoE Team	9	Ret	6	1	Ret	9	10	5	Ret	10	6	Ret	9	1	2	16	5	191
8	(France) Tech3 E-Racing	61	8	9	11	9	4	9	12	7	Ret	Ret	7	11	9	8	7	10	183
8	(France) Tech3 E-Racing	78	5	10	15	12	10	8	14	12	13	8	Ret	8	13	13	9	12	183
9	(Italy) Prettl Pramac MotoE	16															NC	14	96
9	(Italy) Prettl Pramac MotoE	23	10	13	13	11	16	16	16	Ret	Ret	11							96
9	(Italy) Prettl Pramac MotoE	53	6	16	12	13	7	14	8	Ret	11	Ret	10	14	EX	Ret	Ret	8	96
9	(Italy) Prettl Pramac MotoE	99											12	12	14	11			96
Pos.	Team	Bike No.	FRA (France)		ITA (Italy)		GER (Germany)		NED (Netherlands)		GBR (United Kingdom)		AUT (Austria)		CAT (Catalonia)		RSM (San Marino)		Pts
