= Michael Ruben Rinaldi =

Italian motorcycle racer (born 1995)

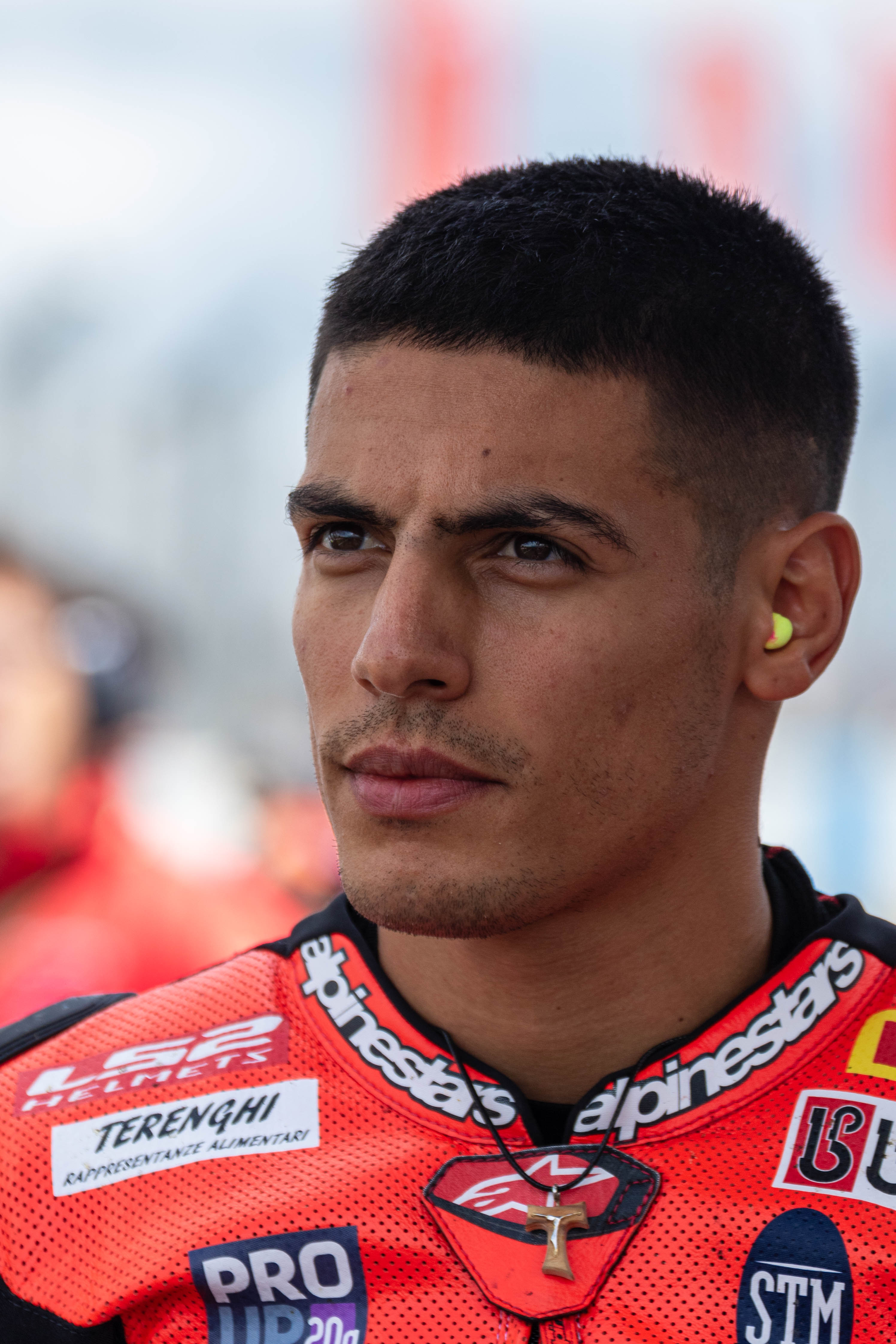
- Michael Ruben Rinaldi, Donington World Superbike 2024
- Nationality: Italian
- Born: 21 December 1995 (age 30); Rimini, Italy
- Current team: Yamaha Motoxracing WorldSBK Team
- Bike number: 21
Motorcycle racing career statistics
Moto3 World Championship
| Active years | 2012, 2014 |
| Manufacturers | Honda, Mahindra |
| Championships | 0 |
| 2014 championship position | NC (0 pts) |
Starts / Wins / Podiums / Poles / F. laps / Points; 4 / 0 / 0 / 0 / 0 / 1
Superbike World Championship
| Active years | 2018– |
| Manufacturers | Ducati, Yamaha |
| Championships | 0 |
| 2025 championship position | 22nd (10 pts) |
Starts / Wins / Podiums / Poles / F. laps / Points; 242 / 5 / 23 / 0 / 4 / 1294
Supersport World Championship
| Active years | 2025 |
| Manufacturers | Yamaha |
| 2025 championship position | 24th (17 pts) |
Starts / Wins / Podiums / Poles / F. laps / Points; 10 / 0 / 0 / 0 / 0 / 17

Michael Ruben Rinaldi (born 21 December 1995) is an Italian motorcycle racer who most recently competed in 2025, in the Supersport World Championship on a Yamaha YZF-R6, and in the Superbike World Championship aboard a Yamaha YZF-R1. Rinaldi has also previously competed in the European Superstock 1000 Championship, where he was champion in 2017, the European Superstock 600 Championship, the CIV Moto3 Championship and the Coppa Italia 125 cc 2T, where he was champion in 2011.

During the 2020 Superbike World Championship Rinaldi won the trophy for Best Independent rider.

As the 2026 season draws to a close, Rinaldi officially announced his retirement from the World Superbike Championship (WSBK). After 242 races, the rider decided to call time on his WorldSBK career. Rinaldi failed to find a team for 2026 after two difficult years.

It was later revealed that in early 2026, Rinaldi launched a new business specializing in watch and jewellry accessories, Rinaldi Boutique. He also returned to racing in the Campionato Italiano Velocità with Team Bmax Racing Ducati.

== Career statistics ==
=== Career highlights ===
- 2014 - 11th, European Superstock 600 Championship #95 Yamaha YZF-R6
- 2016 - 6th, FIM Superstock 1000 Cup, Ducati 1199 Panigale
- 2017 - 1st, European Superstock 1000 Championship, Ducati Panigale 1199 R

=== FIM CEV Moto3 Championship ===
==== Races by year ====
(key) (Races in bold indicate pole position; races in italics indicate fastest lap)

| Year | Bike | 1 | 2 | 3 | 4 | 5 | 6 | 7 | 8 | 9 | Pos | Pts |
|---|---|---|---|---|---|---|---|---|---|---|---|---|
| 2013 | Mahindra | CAT1 | CAT2 | ARA | ALB1; 9 | ALB2 | NAV | VAL1 | VAL1 | JER | 29th | 7 |

=== Grand Prix motorcycle racing ===
==== By season ====
| Season | Class | Motorcycle | Team | Race | Win | Podium | Pole | FLap | Pts | Plcd |
|---|---|---|---|---|---|---|---|---|---|---|
| 2012 | Moto3 | Honda | Racing Team Gabrielli | 1 | 0 | 0 | 0 | 0 | 1 | 38th |
| 2012 | Moto3 | Honda | Caretta Technology | 2 | 0 | 0 | 0 | 0 | 1 | 38th |
| 2014 | Moto3 | Mahindra | San Carlo Team Italia | 1 | 0 | 0 | 0 | 0 | 0 | NC |
| Total | | | | **4** | **0** | **0** | **0** | **0** | **1** | |

==== Races by year ====
(key) (Races in bold indicate pole position; races in italics indicate fastest lap)

| Year | Class | Bike | 1 | 2 | 3 | 4 | 5 | 6 | 7 | 8 | 9 | 10 | 11 | 12 | 13 | 14 | 15 | 16 | 17 | 18 | Pos | Pts |
|---|---|---|---|---|---|---|---|---|---|---|---|---|---|---|---|---|---|---|---|---|---|---|
| 2012 | Moto3 | Honda | QAT | SPA | POR | FRA | CAT | GBR | NED | GER | ITA; 15 | IND | CZE; Ret | RSM; 20 | ARA | JPN | MAL | AUS | VAL | | 38th | 1 |
| 2014 | Moto3 | Mahindra | QAT | AME | ARG | SPA | FRA; 23 | ITA | CAT | NED | GER | IND | CZE | GBR | RSM | ARA | JPN | AUS | MAL | VAL | NC | 0 |

=== FIM European Superstock 600 ===
==== Races by year ====
(key) (Races in bold indicate pole position, races in italics indicate fastest lap)

| Year | Bike | 1 | 2 | 3 | 4 | 5 | 6 | 7 | 8 | Pos | Pts |
|---|---|---|---|---|---|---|---|---|---|---|---|
| 2014 | Yamaha | SPA; 17 | NED; 12 | IMO; 5 | ITA; 12 | POR; 18 | SPA; 6 | FRA; 20 | | 11th | 29 |
| 2015 | Kawasaki | **SPA**; 2 | **SPA**; 19 | NED; 2 | ITA; Ret | **POR**; 2 | ITA; 4 | **SPA**; 1 | **FRA**; Ret | 2nd | 98 |

=== FIM Superstock 1000 Cup ===
==== Races by year ====
(key) (Races in bold indicate pole position, races in italics indicate fastest lap)

| Year | Bike | 1 | 2 | 3 | 4 | 5 | 6 | 7 | 8 | Pos | Pts |
|---|---|---|---|---|---|---|---|---|---|---|---|
| 2016 | Aprilia | ARA; 2 | NED; 3 | IMO; 26 | DON; 5 | MIS; 10 | LAU; 25 | MAG; 8 | JER; 8 | 6th | 69 |

=== European Superstock 1000 Championship ===
==== Races by year ====
(key) (Races in bold indicate pole position) (Races in italics indicate fastest lap)

| Year | Bike | 1 | 2 | 3 | 4 | 5 | 6 | 7 | 8 | 9 | Pos | Pts |
|---|---|---|---|---|---|---|---|---|---|---|---|---|
| 2017 | Ducati | **SPA**; 1 | NED; 2 | **ITA**; 1 | **GBR**; Ret | **ITA**; 2 | GER; 1 | ALG; 9 | FRA; 10 | SPA; 6 | 1st | 138 |

=== Superbike World Championship ===
==== By season ====
| Season | Motorcycle | Team | Race | Win | Podium | Pole | FLap | Pts | Plcd |
|---|---|---|---|---|---|---|---|---|---|
| 2018 | Ducati Panigale R | Aruba.it Racing – Junior Team | 16 | 0 | 0 | 0 | 0 | 77 | 14th |
| 2019 | Ducati Panigale V4 R | BARNI Racing Team | 37 | 0 | 0 | 0 | 0 | 122 | 13th |
| 2020 | Ducati Panigale V4 R | Team GoEleven | 24 | 1 | 3 | 0 | 2 | 186 | 7th |
| 2021 | Ducati Panigale V4 R | Aruba.it Racing – Ducati | 37 | 3 | 7 | 0 | 2 | 282 | 5th |
| 2022 | Ducati Panigale V4 R | Aruba.it Racing – Ducati | 36 | 0 | 4 | 0 | 0 | 293 | 4th |
| 2023 | Ducati Panigale V4 R | Aruba.it Racing – Ducati | 36 | 1 | 9 | 0 | 0 | 251 | 5th |
| 2024 | Ducati Panigale V4 R | Motocorsa Racing | 36 | 0 | 0 | 0 | 0 | 73 | 17th |
| 2025 | Yamaha YZF-R1 | Yamaha Motoxracing WorldSBK Team | 17 | 0 | 0 | 0 | 0 | 10* | 22nd* |
| Total | | | **239** | **5** | **23** | **0** | **4** | **1294** | |

==== Races by year ====
(key) (Races in bold indicate pole position; races in italics indicate fastest lap)

| Year | Bike | 1 | | 2 | | 3 | | 4 | | 5 | | 6 | | 7 | | 8 | | 9 | | 10 | | 11 | | 12 | | 13 | | Pos | Pts |
| Year | Bike | R1 | R2 | R1 | R2 | R1 | R2 | R1 | R2 | R1 | R2 | R1 | R2 | R1 | R2 | R1 | R2 | R1 | R2 | R1 | R2 | R1 | R2 | R1 | R2 | R1 | R2 | Pos | Pts |
|---|---|---|---|---|---|---|---|---|---|---|---|---|---|---|---|---|---|---|---|---|---|---|---|---|---|---|---|---|---|
| 2018 | Ducati | AUS | AUS | THA | THA | SPA; 8 | SPA; 7 | NED; Ret | NED; 12 | ITA; 7 | ITA; 7 | GBR; 12 | GBR; Ret | CZE; 15 | CZE; 6 | USA | USA | ITA; 17 | ITA; 11 | POR; 9 | POR; 8 | FRA; Ret | FRA; 13 | ARG | ARG | QAT | QAT | 14th | 77 |

| Year | Bike | 1 | | | 2 | | | 3 | | | 4 | | | 5 | | | 6 | | | 7 | | | 8 | | | 9 | | | 10 | | | 11 | | | 12 | | | 13 | | | Pos | Pts |
| Year | Bike | R1 | SR | R2 | R1 | SR | R2 | R1 | SR | R2 | R1 | SR | R2 | R1 | SR | R2 | R1 | SR | R2 | R1 | SR | R2 | R1 | SR | R2 | R1 | SR | R2 | R1 | SR | R2 | R1 | SR | R2 | R1 | SR | R2 | R1 | SR | R2 | Pos | Pts |
|---|---|---|---|---|---|---|---|---|---|---|---|---|---|---|---|---|---|---|---|---|---|---|---|---|---|---|---|---|---|---|---|---|---|---|---|---|---|---|---|---|---|---|
| 2019 | Ducati | AUS; 9 | AUS; 8 | AUS; 16 | THA; 8 | THA; 11 | THA; 8 | SPA; 13 | SPA; Ret | SPA; 9 | NED; Ret | NED; C | NED; 15 | ITA; 8 | ITA; 15 | ITA; C | SPA; 10 | SPA; 11 | SPA; 4 | ITA; Ret | ITA; 7 | ITA; 5 | GBR; 12 | GBR; 11 | GBR; 12 | USA; 10 | USA; 13 | USA; 10 | POR; 10 | POR; 11 | POR; 12 | FRA; 14 | FRA; 10 | FRA; 17 | ARG; 12 | ARG; 14 | ARG; 11 | QAT; 13 | QAT; Ret | QAT; 15 | 13th | 122 |
| 2020 | Ducati | AUS; 10 | AUS; 9 | AUS; NC | SPA; 6 | SPA; 11 | SPA; 4 | POR; 5 | POR; 8 | POR; 6 | SPA; 4 | SPA; 8 | SPA; 5 | SPA; 1 | SPA; 3 | SPA; 2 | SPA; 7 | SPA; 6 | SPA; Ret | FRA; 7 | FRA; 7 | FRA; 6 | POR; 7 | POR; 9 | POR; 6 | | | | | | | | | | | | | | | | 7th | 186 |
| 2021 | Ducati | SPA; 7 | SPA; 11 | SPA; 16 | POR; 5 | POR; 5 | POR; Ret | ITA; 1 | ITA; 1 | ITA; 2 | GBR; 12 | GBR; 10 | GBR; 8 | NED; Ret | NED; 2 | NED; 8 | CZE; 4 | CZE; 10 | CZE; 5 | SPA; 10 | SPA; 13 | SPA; 7 | FRA; 4 | FRA; 10 | FRA; 7 | SPA; 3 | SPA; 5 | SPA; 1 | SPA; Ret | SPA; C | SPA; 7 | POR; 4 | POR; Ret | POR; 7 | ARG; 3 | ARG; 8 | ARG; 5 | INA; 12 | INA; C | INA; Ret | 5th | 282 |
| 2022 | Ducati | SPA; 4 | SPA; 4 | SPA; 4 | NED; Ret | NED; 8 | NED; 7 | POR; 9 | POR; 8 | POR; 8 | ITA; 3 | ITA; 10 | ITA; 3 | GBR; 6 | GBR; 6 | GBR; 4 | CZE; 7 | CZE; 4 | CZE; Ret | FRA; 6 | FRA; 7 | FRA; 2 | SPA; 4 | SPA; 5 | SPA; 2 | POR; 7 | POR; 5 | POR; 4 | ARG; 5 | ARG; 4 | ARG; 5 | INA; 5 | INA; 8 | INA; 10 | AUS; 11 | AUS; 22 | AUS; 7 | | | | 4th | 293 |
| 2023 | Ducati | AUS; 14 | AUS; 2 | AUS; 2 | INA; Ret | INA; 7 | INA; 4 | NED; 15 | NED; 13 | NED; 10 | SPA; Ret | SPA; 8 | SPA; 3 | EMI; 2 | EMI; 3 | EMI; Ret | GBR; 13 | GBR; 17 | GBR; Ret | ITA; 5 | ITA; 5 | ITA; 5 | CZE; 14 | CZE; 5 | CZE; 5 | FRA; 2 | FRA; Ret | FRA; Ret | SPA; 1 | SPA; 5 | SPA; 3 | POR; Ret | POR; 6 | POR; 3 | SPA; 8 | SPA; 11 | SPA; 6 | | | | 5th | 251 |
| 2024 | Ducati | AUS; 14 | AUS; 9 | AUS; 6 | SPA; 11 | SPA; 18 | SPA; Ret | NED; Ret | NED; 16 | NED; 13 | ITA; 14 | ITA; 11 | ITA; 16 | GBR; 15 | GBR; 16 | GBR; 17 | CZE; 11 | CZE; 10 | CZE; 7 | POR; 16 | POR; 19 | POR; 16 | FRA; 9 | FRA; 12 | FRA; 15 | ITA; 9 | ITA; 17 | ITA; 13 | SPA; 13 | SPA; 14 | SPA; 14 | POR; 11 | POR; 14 | POR; 9 | SPA; Ret | SPA; 13 | SPA; 11 | | | | 17th | 78 |
| 2025 | Yamaha | AUS | AUS | AUS | POR | POR | POR | NED | NED | NED | ITA | ITA | ITA | CZE | CZE | CZE | EMI; 15 | EMI; 16 | EMI; 15 | GBR; 14 | GBR; 17 | GBR; 18 | HUN; 16 | HUN; 16 | HUN; 14 | FRA; 12 | FRA; 17 | FRA; Ret | ARA; 18 | ARA; Ret | ARA; 20 | POR; DNS | POR; Ret | POR; Ret | SPA; 20 | SPA; 20 | SPA; 20 | | | | 22nd | 10 |

=== Supersport World Championship ===
==== By season ====
| Season | Motorcycle | Team | Race | Win | Podium | Pole | FLap | Pts | Plcd |
|---|---|---|---|---|---|---|---|---|---|
| 2025 | Yamaha YZF-R9 | GMT94 Yamaha | 10 | 0 | 0 | 0 | 0 | 17 | 24th |
| Total | | | **10** | **0** | **0** | **0** | **0** | **17** | |

==== By year ====
(key) (Races in bold indicate pole position; races in italics indicate fastest lap)

| Year | Bike | 1 | | 2 | | 3 | | 4 | | 5 | | 6 | | 7 | | 8 | | 9 | | 10 | | 11 | | 12 | | Pos | Pts |
| Year | Bike | R1 | R2 | R1 | R2 | R1 | R2 | R1 | R2 | R1 | R2 | R1 | R2 | R1 | R2 | R1 | R2 | R1 | R2 | R1 | R2 | R1 | R2 | R1 | R2 | Pos | Pts |
|---|---|---|---|---|---|---|---|---|---|---|---|---|---|---|---|---|---|---|---|---|---|---|---|---|---|---|---|
| 2025 | Yamaha | AUS; Ret | AUS; 4 | POR; 19 | POR; 17 | NED; 16 | NED; 12 | ITA; Ret | ITA; 20 | CZE; 18 | CZE; 20 | MIS | MIS | GBR | GBR | HUN | HUN | FRA | FRA | ARA | ARA | EST | EST | SPA | SPA | 24th | 17 |

=== CIV Superbike Championship ===
==== By year ====
(key) (Races in bold indicate pole position; races in italics indicate fastest lap)

| Year | Bike | Class | 1 | | 2 | | 3 | | 4 | | 5 | | 6 | | Pos | Pts |
| Year | Bike | Class | R1 | R2 | R1 | R2 | R1 | R2 | R1 | R2 | R1 | R2 | R1 | R2 | Pos | Pts |
|---|---|---|---|---|---|---|---|---|---|---|---|---|---|---|---|---|
| 2026 | Ducati | SuperBike | MIS1; 4 | MIS2; Ret | MUG1; 8 | MUG2; 24 | IMO1 | IMO2 | MIS1 | MIS2 | CRE1 | CRE2 | VAL1 | VAL2 | 9th | 21* |
