= 2016 FIM Superstock 1000 Cup =

2016 FIM Superstock 1000 Cup
Previous:	2015	Next:	2017
Support series: Superbike World Championship; Supersport World Championship; European Junior Cup

The 2016 FIM Superstock 1000 Cup was the eighteenth season of the FIM Superstock 1000 Cup, the twelfth held under this name. The championship, a support class to the Superbike World Championship at its European rounds, used 1000 cc motorcycles and was reserved for riders between 16 and 28 years of age. The season was contested over eight races, beginning at Motorland Aragón on 3 April and ending at Circuito de Jerez on 16 October.

== Race calendar and results ==
2016 calendar
Round	Country	Circuit	Date	Pole position	Fastest lap	Winning rider	Winning team
1	Spain	Motorland Aragón	3 April	(France) Florian Marino	(Italy) Michael Ruben Rinaldi	(Argentina) Leandro Mercado	Aruba.it Racing – Junior Team
2	Netherlands	TT Circuit Assen	17 April	(Italy) Riccardo Russo	(Italy) Michael Ruben Rinaldi	(Italy) Raffaele De Rosa	Althea BMW Racing Team
3	Italy	Autodromo Enzo e Dino Ferrari	1 May	(Italy) Roberto Tamburini	(Argentina) Leandro Mercado	(Argentina) Leandro Mercado	Aruba.it Racing – Junior Team
4	United Kingdom	Donington Park	29 May	(Italy) Raffaele De Rosa	(Italy) Raffaele De Rosa	(Italy) Raffaele De Rosa	Althea BMW Racing Team
5	Italy	Misano World Circuit Marco Simoncelli	19 June	(Italy) Marco Faccani	(Italy) Raffaele De Rosa	(France) Lucas Mahias	Pata Yamaha Official Stock Team
6	Germany	Lausitzring	18 September	(Italy) Raffaele De Rosa	(France) Jérémy Guarnoni	(Argentina) Leandro Mercado	Aruba.it Racing – Junior Team
7	France	Circuit de Nevers Magny-Cours	2 October	(France) Lucas Mahias	(Turkey) Toprak Razgatlıoğlu	(France) Lucas Mahias	Pata Yamaha Official Stock Team
8	Spain	Circuito de Jerez	16 October	(Chile) Maximilian Scheib	(France) Lucas Mahias	(Chile) Maximilian Scheib	GraphBikes Easyrace SBK Team

== Entry list ==
2016 entry list
Team	Constructor	Motorcycle	No.	Rider	Rounds
Nuova M2 Racing	Aprilia	Aprilia RSV4 RF	2	(Italy) Roberto Tamburini	All
Nuova M2 Racing	Aprilia	Aprilia RSV4 RF	8	(Italy) Alessandro Nocco	7–8
Nuova M2 Racing	Aprilia	Aprilia RSV4 RF	74	(Italy) Kevin Calia	All
Berclaz Racing by MotoXracing	Yamaha	Yamaha YZF-R1	3	(Switzerland) Sébastien Suchet	All
Berclaz Racing by MotoXracing	Yamaha	Yamaha YZF-R1	15	(Italy) Federico Sandi	5–8
Berclaz Racing by MotoXracing	Yamaha	Yamaha YZF-R1	26	(Italy) Marco Sbaiz	1–3
Berclaz Racing by MotoXracing	Yamaha	Yamaha YZF-R1	44	(Italy) Andrea Tucci	All
Berclaz Racing by MotoXracing	Yamaha	Yamaha YZF-R1	151	(Italy) Tiziano Amicucci	4
SWPN	Yamaha	Yamaha YZF-R1	4	(Netherlands) Danny de Boer	2
Pata Yamaha Official Stock Team	Yamaha	Yamaha YZF-R1	4	(Netherlands) Danny de Boer	4
Pata Yamaha Official Stock Team	Yamaha	Yamaha YZF-R1	14	(Italy) Michael Mazzina	6
Pata Yamaha Official Stock Team	Yamaha	Yamaha YZF-R1	21	(France) Florian Marino	1–2
Pata Yamaha Official Stock Team	Yamaha	Yamaha YZF-R1	53	(Italy) Nicola Morrentino Jr.	5
Pata Yamaha Official Stock Team	Yamaha	Yamaha YZF-R1	84	(Italy) Riccardo Russo	1–2, 6–8
Pata Yamaha Official Stock Team	Yamaha	Yamaha YZF-R1	94	(Italy) Niccolò Canepa	3–4
Pata Yamaha Official Stock Team	Yamaha	Yamaha YZF-R1	96	(France) Louis Rossi	3
Pata Yamaha Official Stock Team	Yamaha	Yamaha YZF-R1	144	(France) Lucas Mahias	5, 7–8
Triple-M Racing	Ducati	Ducati 1199 Panigale R	5	(Italy) Marco Faccani	All
Triple-M Racing	Ducati	Ducati 1199 Panigale R	32	(Germany) Marc Moser	All
BWG Racing	Kawasaki	Kawasaki ZX-10R	6	(Italy) Alessandro Simoneschi	1–3
BWG Racing	Kawasaki	Kawasaki ZX-10R	26	(Italy) Marco Sbaiz	4–5, 7–8
Targo Bank EasyRace SBK Team; GraphBikes Easyrace SBK Team	BMW	BMW S1000RR	7	(Chile) Maximilian Scheib	1, 8
Team Pedercini; Pedercini Racing Kawasaki	Kawasaki	Kawasaki ZX-10R	8	(Italy) Alessandro Nocco	5
Team Pedercini; Pedercini Racing Kawasaki	Kawasaki	Kawasaki ZX-10R	11	(France) Jérémy Guarnoni	All
Team Pedercini; Pedercini Racing Kawasaki	Kawasaki	Kawasaki ZX-10R	23	(France) Christophe Ponsson	1–5
Team Pedercini; Pedercini Racing Kawasaki	Kawasaki	Kawasaki ZX-10R	66	(Italy) Denni Schiavoni	5
Team Pedercini; Pedercini Racing Kawasaki	Kawasaki	Kawasaki ZX-10R	83	(United Kingdom) Danny Buchan	8
Team Pedercini; Pedercini Racing Kawasaki	Kawasaki	Kawasaki ZX-10R	93	(Italy) Roberto Mercandelli	1–3, 6–7
Team Pedercini; Pedercini Racing Kawasaki	Kawasaki	Kawasaki ZX-10R	121	(Italy) Alessandro Andreozzi	1–3
BCC-Racing Team	Yamaha	Yamaha YZF-R1	9	(Germany) Toni Finsterbusch	1
BCC-Racing Team	Kawasaki	Kawasaki ZX-10R	9	(Germany) Toni Finsterbusch	2–6
Aruba.it Racing – Junior Team	Ducati	Ducati 1199 Panigale R	12	(Italy) Michael Ruben Rinaldi	All
Aruba.it Racing – Junior Team	Ducati	Ducati 1199 Panigale R	36	(Argentina) Leandro Mercado	All
Punto Moto Corse by Clasitaly	Kawasaki	Kawasaki ZX-10R	13	(Italy) Federico Sanchioni	All
Punto Moto Corse by Clasitaly	Kawasaki	Kawasaki ZX-10R	99	(Italy) Francesco Cavalli	All
MTM / HS Kawasaki	Kawasaki	Kawasaki ZX-10R	16	(United Kingdom) Gregg Black	1–5, 7–8
MTM / HS Kawasaki	Kawasaki	Kawasaki ZX-10R	77	(Netherlands) Wayne Tessels	All
Kawasaki Palmeto PL Racing	Kawasaki	Kawasaki ZX-10R	18	(Spain) Lucas de Ulacia	1
Agro On–Benjan–Kawasaki	Kawasaki	Kawasaki ZX-10R	19	(Germany) Julian Puffe	All
Agro On–Benjan–Kawasaki	Kawasaki	Kawasaki ZX-10R	24	(Republic of Ireland) Jack Kennedy	7–8
Agro On–Benjan–Kawasaki	Kawasaki	Kawasaki ZX-10R	50	(United States) Bobby Fong	6
Agro On–Benjan–Kawasaki	Kawasaki	Kawasaki ZX-10R	67	(Australia) Bryan Staring	1–2, 6–8
Agro On–Benjan–Kawasaki	Kawasaki	Kawasaki ZX-10R	69	(South Africa) David McFadden	1–5
Agro On–Benjan–Kawasaki	Kawasaki	Kawasaki ZX-10R	82	(United Kingdom) Luke Jones	4–5
Kawasaki Racing Team Sweden	Kawasaki	Kawasaki ZX-10R	25	(Sweden) Jesper Hubner	4
DMR Racing Team	BMW	BMW S1000RR	31	(Italy) Matteo Ferrari	3, 5
Motos Vionnet	BMW	BMW S1000RR	34	(Switzerland) Thomas Toffel	1–4
Motos Vionnet	BMW	BMW S1000RR	51	(Switzerland) Eric Vionnet	All
Althea BMW Racing Team	BMW	BMW S1000RR	35	(Italy) Raffaele De Rosa	All
Team OGP	Yamaha	Yamaha YZF-R1	39	(France) Randy Pagaud	7
FDA Racing Team	BMW	BMW S1000RR	41	(Italy) Federico D'Annunzio	1–3, 6–8
FDA Racing Team	BMW	BMW S1000RR	81	(Italy) Alex Bernardi	5
Team Trasimeno	Yamaha	Yamaha YZF-R1	43	(Italy) Fabio Massei	All
Team Trasimeno	Yamaha	Yamaha YZF-R1	87	(Italy) Luca Marconi	1–5
Team Trasimeno	Yamaha	Yamaha YZF-R1	92	(Switzerland) Bryan Leu	6–8
Kawasaki Puccetti Racing	Kawasaki	Kawasaki ZX-10R	45	(Australia) Jed Metcher	2
Kawasaki Puccetti Racing	Kawasaki	Kawasaki ZX-10R	54	(Turkey) Toprak Razgatlıoğlu	1, 3–8
Team Hartog – Jenik – Against Cancer	Kawasaki	Kawasaki ZX-10R	47	(Netherlands) Rob Hartog	All
D.K. Racing	BMW	BMW S1000RR	52	(Belgium) Gauthier Duwelz	1–5
Speed Action	Yamaha	Yamaha YZF-R1	55	(Italy) Fabio Marchionni	5
SK-Racing Team by Barni	Ducati	Ducati 1199 Panigale R	58	(Italy) Emanuele Pusceddu	1–5
SK-Racing Team by Barni	Ducati	Ducati 1199 Panigale R	121	(Italy) Alessandro Andreozzi	6–8
Guandalini Racing Yamaha	Yamaha	Yamaha YZF-R1	59	(Italy) Andrea Mantovani	All
Team 2R Racing	BMW	BMW S1000RR	70	(Italy) Luca Vitali	All
AM Moto Racing Compétition	Kawasaki	Kawasaki ZX-10R	71	(France) Romain Maitre	7
DRT Racing Team	Yamaha	Yamaha YZF-R1	78	(Ukraine) Konstantin Pisarev	3
DRT Racing Team	Yamaha	Yamaha YZF-R1	95	(Czech Republic) Miroslav Popov	1
Saviofficina Racingteam	Kawasaki	Kawasaki ZX-10R	91	(Italy) Luca Oppedisano	1, 3–6
Leu Racing Team	Yamaha	Yamaha YZF-R1	92	(Switzerland) Bryan Leu	3–4
Stichting Walraven Racing	Honda	Honda CBR1000RR SP	111	(Netherlands) Nigel Walraven	2
GP Project	Aprilia	Aprilia RSV4 RF	123	(Italy) Luca Salvadori	1–4
Team Motozoo by Motoxracing	Yamaha	Yamaha YZF-R1	123	(Italy) Luca Salvadori	6–8

Key
Regular rider
Wildcard rider
Replacement rider

- All entries used Pirelli tyres.

== Championship standings ==
=== Riders' championship ===
Pos.	Rider	Bike	ARA (Spain)	ASS (Netherlands)	IMO (Italy)	DON (United Kingdom)	MIS (Italy)	LAU (Germany)	MAG (France)	JER (Spain)	Pts
1	(Italy) Raffaele De Rosa	BMW	3	1	3	**1**	19	**10**	3	5	115
2	(Argentina) Leandro Mercado	Ducati	1	9	1	2	Ret	1	7	Ret	111
3	(Italy) Kevin Calia	Aprilia	6	13	2	4	2	5	Ret	9	84
4	(France) Lucas Mahias	Yamaha					1		**1**	2	70
5	(Turkey) Toprak Razgatlıoğlu	Kawasaki	DNS		5	6	4	Ret	2	3	70
6	(Italy) Michael Ruben Rinaldi	Ducati	2	3	26	5	10	25	8	8	69
7	(Italy) Roberto Tamburini	Aprilia	Ret	20	**4**	7	5	9	4	4	66
8	(France) Jérémy Guarnoni	Kawasaki	Ret	2	11	Ret	8	4	5	Ret	57
9	(Italy) Riccardo Russo	Yamaha	4	**Ret**				3	6	6	49
10	(Italy) Andrea Mantovani	Yamaha	7	5	8	15	9	Ret	11	11	46
11	(Italy) Marco Faccani	Ducati	Ret	4	Ret	Ret	**3**	Ret	13	7	41
12	(Italy) Luca Vitali	BMW	11	12	6	DNS	6	8	Ret	19	37
13	(Chile) Maximilian Scheib	BMW	9							**1**	32
14	(United Kingdom) Gregg Black	Kawasaki	22	8	13	8	13		9	DNS	29
15	(Switzerland) Sébastien Suchet	Yamaha	15	24	7	13	Ret	7	10	Ret	28
16	(Australia) Bryan Staring	Kawasaki	12	19				2	14	Ret	26
17	(Italy) Fabio Massei	Yamaha	10	21	9	Ret	12	11	19	12	26
18	(Netherlands) Wayne Tessels	Kawasaki	Ret	7	22	9	16	12	24	13	23
19	(Italy) Niccolò Canepa	Yamaha			12	3					20
20	(Italy) Luca Salvadori	Aprilia	16	6	Ret	18					20
20	(Italy) Luca Salvadori	Yamaha						6	Ret	DNS	20
21	(Italy) Matteo Ferrari	BMW			10		7				15
22	(France) Florian Marino	Yamaha	**5**	DNS							11
23	(Italy) Luca Marconi	Yamaha	8	Ret	Ret	Ret	14				10
24	(Italy) Alessandro Nocco	Kawasaki					22				10
24	(Italy) Alessandro Nocco	Aprilia							12	10	10
25	(Italy) Alessandro Andreozzi	Kawasaki	13	Ret	14						7
25	(Italy) Alessandro Andreozzi	Ducati						14	DNS	Ret	7
26	(United Kingdom) Luke Jones	Kawasaki				10	25				6
27	(Netherlands) Rob Hartog	Kawasaki	21	10	20	19	Ret	Ret	26	17	6
28	(Germany) Marc Moser	Ducati	20	11	15	21	24	17	Ret	16	6
29	(France) Christophe Ponsson	Kawasaki	14	14	16	14	18				6
30	(Italy) Andrea Tucci	Yamaha	Ret	DNS	21	23	11	21	18	DNS	5
31	(Netherlands) Danny de Boer	Yamaha		Ret		11					5
32	(Germany) Julian Puffe	Kawasaki	Ret	Ret	28	12	17	19	17	Ret	4
33	(Italy) Michael Mazzina	Yamaha						13			3
34	(Italy) Federico D'Annunzio	BMW	Ret	Ret	DNS			24	21	14	2
35	(United Kingdom) Danny Buchan	Kawasaki								15	1
36	(Switzerland) Eric Vionnet	BMW	19	23	19	17	23	Ret	15	Ret	1
37	(Germany) Toni Finsterbusch	Yamaha	18								1
37	(Germany) Toni Finsterbusch	Kawasaki		22	27	Ret	21	15			1
38	(Italy) Federico Sandi	Yamaha					15	Ret	Ret	Ret	1
39	(Italy) Roberto Mercandelli	Kawasaki	Ret	15	DNS			Ret	DNS		1
	(Republic of Ireland) Jack Kennedy	Kawasaki							16	DNS	0
	(United States) Bobby Fong	Kawasaki						16			0
	(South Africa) David McFadden	Kawasaki	17	18	23	16	26				0
	(Italy) Alessandro Simoneschi	Kawasaki	25	16	30						0
	(France) Louis Rossi	Yamaha			17						0
	(Belgium) Gauthier Duwelz	BMW	DNS	17	DNS	25	34				0
	(Switzerland) Bryan Leu	Yamaha			31	22		22	22	18	0
	(Italy) Luca Oppedisano	Kawasaki	Ret		25	Ret	29	18			0
	(Italy) Francesco Cavalli	Kawasaki	26	25	18	20	31	23	25	20	0
	(France) Romain Maitre	Kawasaki							20		0
	(Italy) Federico Sanchioni	Kawasaki	Ret	27	24	24	32	20	Ret	Ret	0
	(Italy) Nicola Morrentino Jr.	Yamaha					20				0
	(Italy) Marco Sbaiz	Yamaha	Ret	28	Ret						0
	(Italy) Marco Sbaiz	Kawasaki				26	33		27	21	0
	(France) Randy Pagaud	Yamaha							23		0
	(Czech Republic) Miroslav Popov	Yamaha	23								0
	(Spain) Lucas de Ulacia	Kawasaki	24								0
	(Australia) Jed Metcher	Kawasaki		26							0
	(Italy) Denni Schiavoni	Kawasaki					27				0
	(Switzerland) Thomas Toffel	BMW	27	DNQ	DNQ	DNQ					0
	(Italy) Fabio Marchionni	Yamaha					28				0
	(Italy) Emanuele Pusceddu	Ducati	Ret	Ret	29	Ret	Ret				0
	(Italy) Alex Bernardi	BMW					30				0
	(Ukraine) Konstantin Pisarev	Yamaha			32						0
	(Sweden) Jesper Hubner	Kawasaki				Ret					0
	(Italy) Tiziano Amicucci	Yamaha				Ret					0
	(Netherlands) Nigel Walraven	Honda		Ret							0
Pos.	Rider	Bike	ARA (Spain)	ASS (Netherlands)	IMO (Italy)	DON (United Kingdom)	MIS (Italy)	LAU (Germany)	MAG (France)	JER (Spain)	Pts

Colour	Result
Gold	Winner
Silver	Second place
Bronze	Third place
Green	Points classification
Blue	Non-points classification
Blue	Non-classified finish (NC)
Purple	Retired, not classified (Ret)
Red	Did not qualify (DNQ)
Red	Did not pre-qualify (DNPQ)
Black	Disqualified (DSQ)
White	Did not start (DNS)
White	Withdrew (WD)
White	Race cancelled (C)
Blank	Did not practice (DNP)
Blank	Did not arrive (DNA)
Blank	Excluded (EX)

**Bold** – Pole position
Italics – Fastest lap

=== Manufacturers' championship ===
Pos.	Manufacturer	ARA (Spain)	ASS (Netherlands)	IMO (Italy)	DON (United Kingdom)	MIS (Italy)	LAU (Germany)	MAG (France)	JER (Spain)	Pts
1	(Italy) Ducati	1	3	1	2	3	1	7	7	145
2	(Germany) BMW	3	1	3	1	6	8	3	1	141
3	(Japan) Yamaha	4	5	7	3	1	3	1	2	135
4	(Japan) Kawasaki	12	2	5	6	4	2	2	3	114
5	(Italy) Aprilia	6	6	2	4	2	5	4	4	110
	(Japan) Honda		Ret							0
Pos.	Manufacturer	ARA (Spain)	ASS (Netherlands)	IMO (Italy)	DON (United Kingdom)	MIS (Italy)	LAU (Germany)	MAG (France)	JER (Spain)	Pts
