= Toni Finsterbusch =

German motorcycle racer (born 1993)

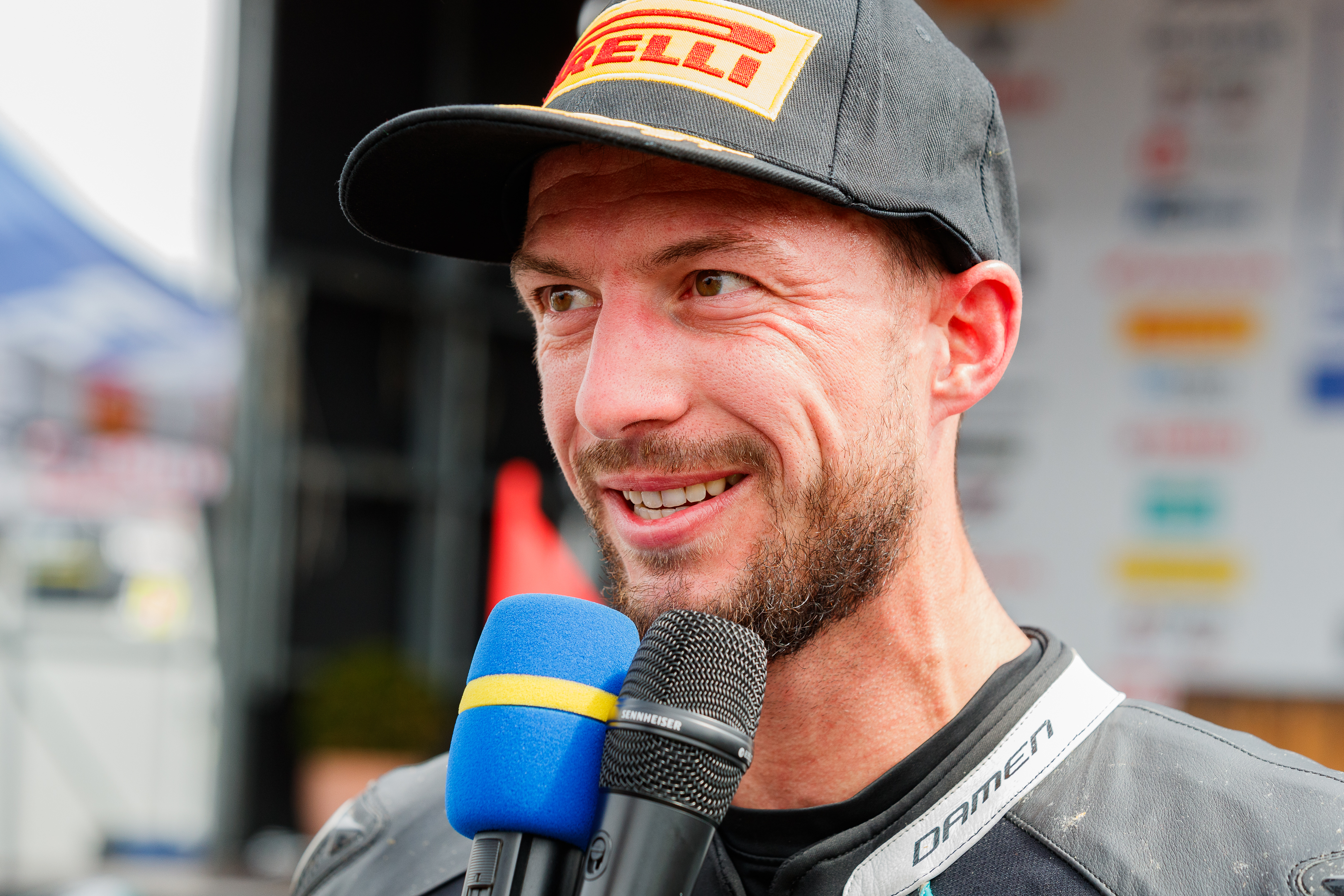
- 2023 at IDM Schleiz
- Nationality: German
- Born: 14 June 1993 (age 33); Leipzig, Germany
- Current team: Gert56
- Bike number: 56
Motorcycle racing career statistics
Moto3 World Championship
Active years	2012–
Manufacturers	MZ-RE Honda, MZ FTR, Honda, Kalex KTM
2013 championship position	NC (0 pts)
Starts / Wins / Podiums / Poles / F. laps / Points; 32 / 0 / 0 / 0 / 0 / 7
125cc World Championship
Active years	2009–2011
Manufacturers	Honda, KTM
2011 championship position	29th (4 pts)
Starts / Wins / Podiums / Poles / F. laps / Points; 4 / 0 / 0 / 0 / 0 / 4

Toni Finsterbusch (born 14 June 1993 in Leipzig) is a German Grand Prix motorcycle racer. He currently competes in the IDM Superbike Championship aboard a BMW M 1000 RR in the team GERT56. He has also competed in the Moto3 World Championship, the FIM CEV Moto2 International Championship, the European Superstock 1000 Championship, the European Superstock 600 Championship, the ADAC Junior Cup and the German IDM 125 Championship, finishing as runner-up in both championships, in 2007 and 2010 respectively.

== Career statistics ==
=== Career highlights ===
2015 - 27th, European Superstock 600 Championship #90 Kawasaki ZX-6R
2016 - 37th, FIM Superstock 1000 Cup, Yamaha YZF-R1, Kawasaki ZX-10R
2017 - 20th, European Superstock 1000 Championship, Kawasaki ZX-10R

=== FIM Moto2 European Championship ===
==== Races by year ====
(key) (Races in bold indicate pole position) (Races in italics indicate fastest lap)

Year	Bike	1	2	3	4	5	6	7	8	9	10	Pos	Pts
2014	AJR	JER; Ret	ARA1; 17	ARA2; 11	CAT; 10	ALB; 13	NAV1; 14	NAV2; 14	ALG1; Ret	ALG2; 16	VAL; Ret	22nd	18

=== Grand Prix motorcycle racing ===
==== By season ====
Season	Class	Motorcycle	Team	Number	Race	Win	Podium	Pole	FLap	Pts	Plcd
2009	125cc	Honda	Freudenberg Racing Team	76	1	0	0	0	0	0	NC
2010	125cc	KTM	Freudenberg Racing Team	68	2	0	0	0	0	0	NC
2011	125cc	KTM	Freudenberg Racing Team	42	1	0	0	0	0	4	29th
2012	Moto3	MZ-RE Honda	Cresto Guide MZ Racing Team	9	15	0	0	0	0	7	30th
2012	Moto3	MZ FTR	Cresto Guide MZ Racing Team	9	15	0	0	0	0	7	30th
2012	Moto3	Honda	Cresto Guide MZ Racing Team	9	15	0	0	0	0	7	30th
2013	Moto3	Kalex KTM	Kiefer Racing	9	17	0	0	0	0	0	NC
Total					**36**	**0**	**0**	**0**	**0**	**11**	

==== Races by year ====
(key) (Races in bold indicate pole position)

Yr	Class	Bike	1	2	3	4	5	6	7	8	9	10	11	12	13	14	15	16	17	Pos	Pts
2009	125cc	Honda	QAT	JPN	SPA	FRA	ITA	CAT	NED	GER; 21	GBR	CZE	INP	RSM	POR	AUS	MAL	VAL		NC	0
2010	125cc	KTM	QAT	SPA	FRA	ITA	GBR	NED; 20	CAT	GER; Ret	CZE	INP	RSM	ARA	JPN	MAL	AUS	POR	VAL	NC	0
2011	125cc	KTM	QAT	SPA	POR	FRA	CAT	GBR	NED	ITA	GER; 12	CZE	INP	RSM	ARA	JPN	AUS	MAL	VAL	29th	4
2012	Moto3	MZ-RE Honda	QAT; 23																	30th	7
2012	Moto3	MZ FTR		SPA; Ret																30th	7
2012	Moto3	Honda			POR; 21	FRA; DNS	CAT	GBR; 19	NED; 14	GER; 11	ITA; 18	INP; 16	CZE; Ret	RSM; 18	ARA; 18	JPN; Ret	MAL; 23	AUS; Ret	VAL; Ret	30th	7
2013	Moto3	Kalex KTM	QAT; 19	AME; Ret	SPA; Ret	FRA; 18	ITA; 21	CAT; Ret	NED; 24	GER; 21	INP; Ret	CZE; 25	GBR; 21	RSM; 26	ARA; Ret	MAL; Ret	AUS; 23	JPN; 21	VAL; 24	NC	0

=== FIM European Superstock 600 ===
==== Races by year ====
(key) (Races in bold indicate pole position, races in italics indicate fastest lap)

Year	Bike	1	2	3	4	5	6	7	8	Pos	Pts
2015	Kawasaki	SPA	SPA	NED	ITA	POR; 14	ITA; Ret	SPA; Ret	FRA; 13	27th	5

=== Superstock 1000 Cup ===
==== Races by year ====
(key) (Races in bold indicate pole position) (Races in italics indicate fastest lap)

Year	Bike	1	2	3	4	5	6	7	8	Pos	Pts
2016	Yamaha/Kawasaki	ARA; 18	NED; 22	IMO; 27	DON; Ret	MIS; 21	LAU; 15	MAG	JER	37th	1

=== European Superstock 1000 Championship ===
==== Races by year ====
(key) (Races in bold indicate pole position) (Races in italics indicate fastest lap)

Year	Bike	1	2	3	4	5	6	7	8	9	Pos	Pts
2017	Kawasaki	ARA; 18	NED; 16	IMO; Ret	DON	MIS; Ret	LAU; 13	ALG; 10	MAG; 23	JER; Ret	20th	9
