= Leandro Mercado =

Argentine motorcycle racer (born 1992)

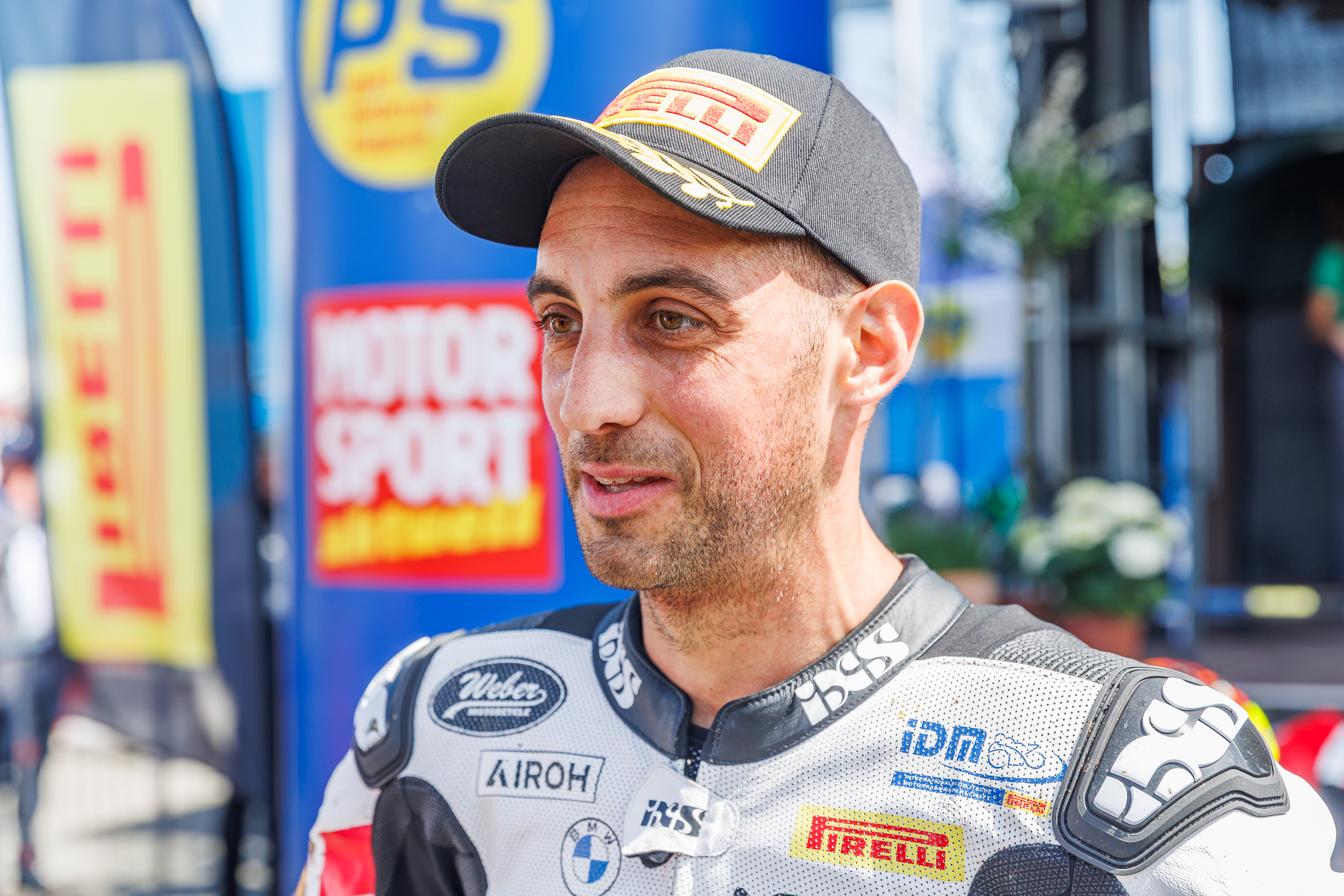
- Mercado in 2025
- Born: 15 February 1992 (age 34); Córdoba, Argentina
- Current team: YART
- Bike number: 36
Motorcycle racing career statistics
Superbike World Championship
Active years	2012, 2015, 2017–
Manufacturers	Kawasaki, Ducati, Aprilia, Honda
Championships	0
2024 championship position	31st (0 pts)
Starts / Wins / Podiums / Poles / F. laps / Points; 197 / 0 / 0 / 0 / 0 / 502

Leandro Denis "Tati" Mercado (born 15 February 1992) is a motorcycle racer from Argentina who will compete in the 2026 FIM Endurance World Championship for YART Yamaha in 2026. He is best known for winning the National title of the AMA Supersport Championship in 2009, the FIM Superstock 1000 Cup in 2014, and the 24 Hours of Le Mans in 2026.

== Career ==
=== Junior career ===
After finishing third in the Red Bull AMA Rookies Cup in 2008, Mercado achieved the same result in the East division of the AMA Supersport Championship the following year, and won the National title in the Shootout race held in Daytona. In 2010, he was seventh in the CIV Stock 600 Championship and contested three races of the European Superstock 600 Championship on a Kawasaki ZX-6R, while in 2011, he finished sixth in the CIV Stock 1000 Championship and sixteenth in the FIM Superstock 1000 Cup on a Kawasaki ZX-10R.

=== Superstock and Superbike World Championship ===
In 2012 Mercado raced in the Superbike World Championship for eight rounds in the first half of the season, before moving back to the FIM Superstock 1000 Cup. He was 26th and 15th respectively in the standings. For the following two seasons, he continued competing in the Superstock category, finishing fourth in 2013 with Kawasaki machinery, and winning the 2014 title on a Ducati 1199.

For 2015, Mercado returned to the Superbike World Championship full time, finishing eighth in the final standings. In 2016, he once again returned to the Superstock category, where he finished as runner-up. In 2017, he would ride for IodaRacing Project on an Aprilia RSV4 in the Superbike championship, finishing 13th in the championship, with 115 points.

Mercado switched to Kawasaki for the 2018 Superbike World Championship, riding the Kawasaki Ninja ZX-10R, but only finished 15th at the end of the season, with 70 points. He would stay with Kawasaki for 2019, but the results would remain the same, 80 points and 16th in the standings at the end of the year.

For the 2020 Superbike World Championship, Mercado switched to a Ducati, riding for Motocorsa Racing team, on a Ducati Panigale V4. After missing the opening rounds in Australia, Mercado was also forced to miss time in the middle of the season due to injuries, missing ten races altogether, and therefore only finished 16th at the end of the year, with 24 points. In 2021, Mercado would switch teams again, this time riding a Honda CBR1000RR, for MIE Racing Honda Team. Once again, injuries plagued Mercado's season, as well as a COVID-19 absence from the Czech weekend, leading to a career-low 26 points from him in the season, and 21st in the standings. Nevertheless, Honda announced that he would stay for 2022, partnered by Hafizh Syahrin.

=== IDM Superbike ===
In 2023, Mercado would do multiple rounds of the IDM Superbike championship onboard a Kawasaki ZX-10RR. He would do the full season in 2024, finishing 9th in the standings. In 2025, he would join the Masteroil Alpha Van-Zon BMW team riding a BMW M1000RR. He finished fifth in the standings with 167.5 points.

=== FIM Endurance World Championship ===
On 10 November 2025, it was announced that Mercado would join YART for 2026.

== Career statistics ==
=== Career highlights ===
- 2009 - 1st, AMA Supersport Championship National, Kawasaki Ninja ZX-6R
- 2013 - 4th, FIM Superstock 1000 Cup, Kawasaki ZX-10R
- 2014 - 1st, FIM Superstock 1000 Cup, Ducati 1098R
- 2016 - 2nd, FIM Superstock 1000 Cup, Ducati 1199 Panigale
- 2026 - 1st, 24 Hours of Le Mans, Yamaha YZF-R1

=== European Superstock 600 ===
==== Races by year ====
(key) (Races in bold indicate pole position, races in italics indicate fastest lap)

Year	Bike	1	2	3	4	5	6	7	8	9	10	Pos	Pts
2010	Kawasaki	POR	VAL	ASS	MNZ; Ret	MIS; 5	BRN	SIL	NÜR	IMO; Ret	MAG	17th	25

=== Superstock 1000 Cup ===
==== Races by year ====
(key) (Races in bold indicate pole position) (Races in italics indicate fastest lap)

Year	Bike	1	2	3	4	5	6	7	8	9	10	Pos	Pts
2011	Kawasaki	NED; Ret	MNZ; DNS	SMR; 15	ARA; 14	BRN; 17	SIL; 5	NŰR; 17	IMO; 14	MAG; 15	ALG; 13	16th	20
2012	Kawasaki	IMO	NED	MNZ	SMR	ARA	BRN	SIL; 8	NŰR; 4	ALG; 8	MAG; Ret	15th	29
2013	Kawasaki	ARA; 3	NED; 4	MNZ; 9	ALG; 4	IMO; 5	SIL; 6	SIL; 2	NŰR; 1	MAG; 5	JER; 2	4th	146
2014	Kawasaki	ARA; 1	NED; 5	IMO; 3	MIS; 2	ALG; 9	JER; 1	MAG; 4				1st	117
2016	Ducati	ARA; 1	NED; 9	IMO; 1	DON; 2	MIS; Ret	LAU; 1	MAG; 7	JER; Ret			2nd	111

=== Superbike World Championship ===
==== Races by year ====
(key) (Races in bold indicate pole position; races in italics indicate fastest lap)

Year	Bike	1		2		3		4		5		6		7		8		9		10		11		12		13		14		Pos	Pts
Year	Bike	R1	R2	R1	R2	R1	R2	R1	R2	R1	R2	R1	R2	R1	R2	R1	R2	R1	R2	R1	R2	R1	R2	R1	R2	R1	R2	R1	R2	Pos	Pts
2012	Kawasaki	AUS	AUS	ITA; 14	ITA; Ret	NED; 10	NED; 15	ITA; C	ITA; 16	EUR; Ret	EUR; Ret	USA; Ret	USA; 17	SMR; 19	SMR; 16	SPA; Ret	SPA; 18	CZE; Ret	CZE; DNS	GBR	GBR	RUS	RUS	GER	GER	POR	POR	FRA	FRA	26th	9
2015	Ducati	AUS; 12	AUS; 11	THA; 10	THA; 10	SPA; 8	SPA; 7	NED; 11	NED; 14	ITA; 7	ITA; 8	GBR; 11	GBR; 13	POR; 8	POR; 9	SMR; 11	SMR; Ret	USA; 9	USA; 9	MAL; 15	MAL; 15	SPA; 14	SPA; 10	FRA; 9	FRA; 12	QAT; 9	QAT; 6			8th	142
2017	Aprilia	AUS	AUS	THA	THA	SPA; 7	SPA; 8	NED; 9	NED; 12	ITA; Ret	ITA; 10	GBR; 7	GBR; Ret	ITA; Ret	ITA; 9	USA; 9	USA; 7	GER; 11	GER; 12	POR; Ret	POR; 7	FRA; 7	FRA; 6	SPA; 11	SPA; 9	QAT	QAT			13th	115
2018	Kawasaki	AUS; 10	AUS; 12	THA; 13	THA; Ret	SPA; Ret	SPA; 13	NED; 8	NED; Ret	ITA; 15	ITA; 10	GBR; 13	GBR; 12	CZE; 12	CZE; 17	USA; Ret	USA; 11	ITA; 10	ITA; 17	POR; 11	POR; 15	FRA; 14	FRA; 15	ARG; Ret	ARG; 12	QAT; 12	QAT; C			15th	70

Year	Bike	1			2			3			4			5			6			7			8			9			10			11			12			13			Pos	Pts
Year	Bike	R1	SR	R2	R1	SR	R2	R1	SR	R2	R1	SR	R2	R1	SR	R2	R1	SR	R2	R1	SR	R2	R1	SR	R2	R1	SR	R2	R1	SR	R2	R1	SR	R2	R1	SR	R2	R1	SR	R2	Pos	Pts
2019	Kawasaki	AUS; 14	AUS; Ret	AUS; 11	THA; 12	THA; 12	THA; Ret	SPA; Ret	SPA; DNS	SPA; DNS	NED	NED	NED	ITA	ITA	ITA	SPA; 13	SPA; 13	SPA; 11	ITA; 10	ITA; 9	ITA; Ret	GBR; 6	GBR; Ret	GBR; 14	USA; 12	USA; 9	USA; 11	POR; 14	POR; 16	POR; 15	FRA; 12	FRA; 14	FRA; 11	ARG; 9	ARG; 10	ARG; 8	QAT; Ret	QAT; 11	QAT; 11	16th	80
2020	Ducati	AUS	AUS	AUS	SPA; Ret	SPA; 17	SPA; 15	POR; 16	POR; 14	POR; 10	SPA; 11	SPA; Ret	SPA; DNS	SPA	SPA	SPA	SPA; WD	SPA; WD	SPA; WD	FRA; 10	FRA; 10	FRA; Ret	POR; 13	POR; 14	POR; 13																16th	24
2021	Honda	SPA; Ret	SPA; 18	SPA; 18	POR	POR	POR	ITA	ITA	ITA	GBR	GBR	GBR	NED; 12	NED; 14	NED; 13	CZE	CZE	CZE	SPA; Ret	SPA; 18	SPA; 15	FRA; Ret	FRA; 19	FRA; 17	SPA; 15	SPA; 10	SPA; 14	SPA; Ret	SPA; C	SPA; 15	POR; 8	POR; 11	POR; 11	ARG; 16	ARG; 16	ARG; 15	INA; 9	INA; C	INA; Ret	21st	33
2022	Honda	SPA; 20	SPA; 20	SPA; 21	NED; 19	NED; 18	NED; 15	POR; Ret	POR; 14	POR; 18	ITA; 19	ITA; 19	ITA; 18	GBR; Ret	GBR; 20	GBR; 17	CZE; 17	CZE; 17	CZE; 15	FRA; 21	FRA; 20	FRA; Ret	SPA; 18	SPA; 19	SPA; 27	POR; 23	POR; 21	POR; 20	ARG; Ret	ARG; 17	ARG; 19	INA; Ret	INA; 16	INA; 17	AUS; 17	AUS; 14	AUS; 15				29th	3
2023	Honda	AUS	AUS	AUS	INA	INA	INA	NED	NED	NED	SPA	SPA	SPA	ITA	ITA	ITA	GBR	GBR	GBR	ITA	ITA	ITA	CZE	CZE	CZE	FRA	FRA	FRA	SPA	SPA	SPA	POR	POR	POR	JER; 17	JER; 20	JER; 21				NC	0
2024	Honda	AUS	AUS	AUS	SPA	SPA	SPA	NED	NED	NED	ITA	ITA	ITA	GBR	GBR	GBR	CZE; 20	CZE; 19	CZE; 17	POR	POR	POR	FRA	FRA	FRA	ITA	ITA	ITA	SPA	SPA	SPA	POR	POR	POR	SPA	SPA	SPA				31st	0

* Season still in progress.

=== FIM Endurance World Cup ===
Year	Team	Bike	Tyre	Rider	Pts	TC
2025	(Belgium) Champion-MRP-Tecmas	BMW S1000RR	**D**	(Argentina) Leandro Mercado (Estonia) Hannes Soomer (Germany) Jan Bühn	35*	9th*

=== 24 Hours of Le Mans results ===
Year	Team	Riders	Bike	Pos
2026	(Austria) YART Yamaha	(Czech Republic) Karel Hanika (Germany) Marvin Fritz (Argentina) Leandro Mercado	Yamaha YZF-R1	1st

=== Suzuka 8 Hours results ===
Year	Class	Team	Co-riders	Bike	Pos
2025	**SST**	(Japan) TONE Team 4413 EVA 02 BMW	(Japan) Tomoya Hoshino (Japan) Ainosuke Yoshida	BMW S1000RR	17th
2026	**EWC**	(Austria) YART Yamaha	(Czech Republic) Karel Hanika (Germany) Marvin Fritz	Yamaha YZF-R1	TBD
