= Althea Racing =

Italian motorcycle racing team

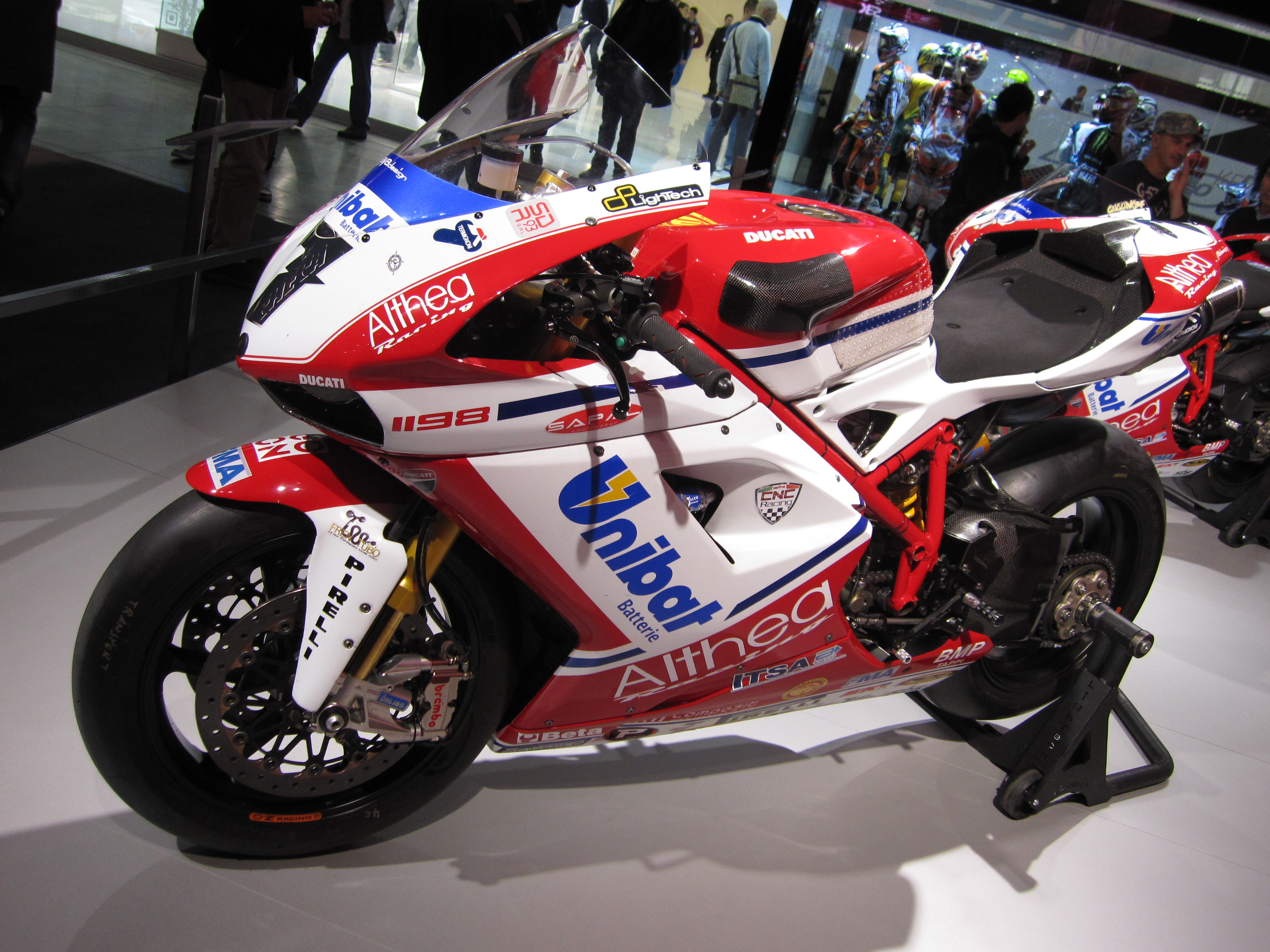
- 2026 name: Ecosantagata Althea Racing Team
- Base: Civita Castellana, Italy
- Team principal/s: Genesio Bevilacqua
- Race riders: Alessandro Zaccone; Andrea Giombini
- Motorcycle: Ducati Panigale V2
- Tyres: Pirelli
- Riders' Championships: WSBK: 2011: Carlos Checa; STK1000: 2011: Davide Giugliano; 2016: Raffaele De Rosa

Althea Racing is a motorcycle racing team based in Civita Castellana, Italy. As of 2026, the team operates within the Supersport World Championship with Ducati machinery as Ecosantagata Althea Racing Team, using two Italian riders, Alessandro Zaccone, and Andrea Giombini. Althea previously competed in the now defunct European Superstock 1000 Championship, winning the title in 2016 with rider Raffaele De Rosa.

In 2020, the race season was disrupted by the COVID-19 pandemic after the first round in March hosted in Australia; on resumption in August Jordi Torres was replaced by Lorenzo Gabellini for three rounds until Althea's Italian management split from Moriwaki.

== Race results ==
=== World Supersport Championship ===
Year	Team	Bike	No	Rider	1		2		3		4		5		6		7		8		9		10		11		12		RC	Points	TC	Points	MC	Points
Year	Team	Bike	No	Rider	R1	R2	R1	R2	R1	R2	R1	R2	R1	R2	R1	R2	R1	R2	R1	R2	R1	R2	R1	R2	R1	R2	R1	R2	RC	Points	TC	Points	MC	Points
2022	Althea Racing	Ducati Panigale V2	64	(Italy) Federico Caricasulo	SPA; 8	SPA; 12	NED; 5	NED; 25	POR; 5	POR; Ret	ITA; Ret	ITA; 6	GBR; Ret	GBR; 4	CZE; Ret	CZE; 6	FRA; Ret	FRA; 9	SPA; 4	SPA; 6	POR; 3	POR; 4	ARG; 3	ARG; 2	INA; 2	INA; 7	AUS; 7	AUS; 2	5th	222	8th	222	2nd	368
2023	Althea Racing	Ducati Panigale V2	64	(Italy) Federico Caricasulo	AUS; 10	AUS; Ret	INA; 2	INA; 1	NED; 6	NED; 3	SPA; 5	SPA; 6	EMI; 3	EMI; 4	GBR; 4	GBR; 3	ITA; Ret	ITA; Ret	CZE; 10	CZE; 11	FRA; 8	FRA; 10	SPA; 4	SPA; 3	POR; 6	POR; 5	JER; 3	JER; 5	4th	258	4th	258	1st	540
2024	Ecosantagata Althea Racing Team	Ducati Panigale V2	5	(Italy) Niccolò Antonelli	AUS; Ret	AUS; 17	SPA; 9	SPA; 18	NED; 15	NED; 4	ITA; 23	ITA; 9	GBR; 19	GBR; 16	CZE; 27	CZE; 18	POR; Ret	POR; 13	FRA; 30	FRA; 21	ITA; Ret	ITA; DNS	SPA; 13	SPA; Ret	POR; 16	POR; 14	SPA; 9	SPA; 13	17th	46	15th	56	1st	556
2024	Ecosantagata Althea Racing Team	Ducati Panigale V2	43	(Denmark) Simon Jespersen	AUS	AUS	SPA	SPA	NED	NED	ITA	ITA	GBR	GBR	CZE	CZE	POR	POR	FRA	FRA	ITA	ITA	SPA	SPA	POR	POR	SPA; 18	SPA; 20	49th	0	15th	56	1st	556
2024	Ecosantagata Althea Racing Team	Ducati Panigale V2	74	(Poland) Piotr Biesiekirski	AUS	AUS	SPA; 17	SPA; Ret	NED; 21	NED; 12	ITA; 18	ITA; 15	GBR; 18	GBR; 17	CZE; Ret	CZE; Ret	POR; 16	POR; 16	FRA; 29	FRA; 15	ITA; 17	ITA; 18	SPA; 15	SPA; 18	POR; 13	POR; DNS	SPA	SPA	26th	10	15th	56	1st	556
2025	Ecosantagata Althea Racing Team	Ducati Panigale V2	24	(Italy) Leonardo Taccini	AUS; Ret	AUS; 15	POR; 12	POR; 9	NED; 6	NED; Ret	ITA; 17	ITA; 12	CZE; 13	CZE; 23	EMI; 12	EMI; 10	GBR; 14	GBR; Ret	HUN; 16	HUN; Ret	FRA; Ret	FRA; 16	ARA	ARA	POR; 12	POR; 15	SPA; 20	SPA; DNS	21st	46	11th	119	2nd	381
2025	Ecosantagata Althea Racing Team	Ducati Panigale V2	43	(Denmark) Simon Jespersen	AUS; 15	AUS; 12	POR; 18	POR; 14	NED; 15	NED; 11	ITA; Ret	ITA; Ret	CZE; 11	CZE; 16	EMI; 15	EMI; 14	GBR; 11	GBR; 16	HUN; 6	HUN; 2	FRA; 25	FRA; 6	ARA; 15	ARA; 16	POR; Ret	POR; 11	SPA; 22	SPA; 15	16th	73	11th	119	2nd	381
2026	Ecosantagata Althea Racing Team	Ducati Panigale V2	10	(Italy) Leonardo Taccini	AUS	AUS	POR	POR	NED	NED	HUN	HUN	CZE	CZE	ARA	ARA	EMI	EMI	GBR	GBR	FRA	FRA	ITA	ITA	POR	POR	SPA	SPA	NC*	0*	NC*	0*	NC*	0*
2026	Ecosantagata Althea Racing Team	Ducati Panigale V2	16	(Italy) Alessandro Zaccone	AUS	AUS	POR	POR	NED	NED	HUN	HUN	CZE	CZE	ARA	ARA	EMI	EMI	GBR	GBR	FRA	FRA	ITA	ITA	POR	POR	SPA	SPA	NC*	0*	NC*	0*	NC*	0*
