= 2017 Superbike World Championship =

2017 Superbike World Championship
Previous:	2016	Next:	2018
Support series: Supersport World Championship; Supersport 300 World Championship; European Superstock 1000 Championship

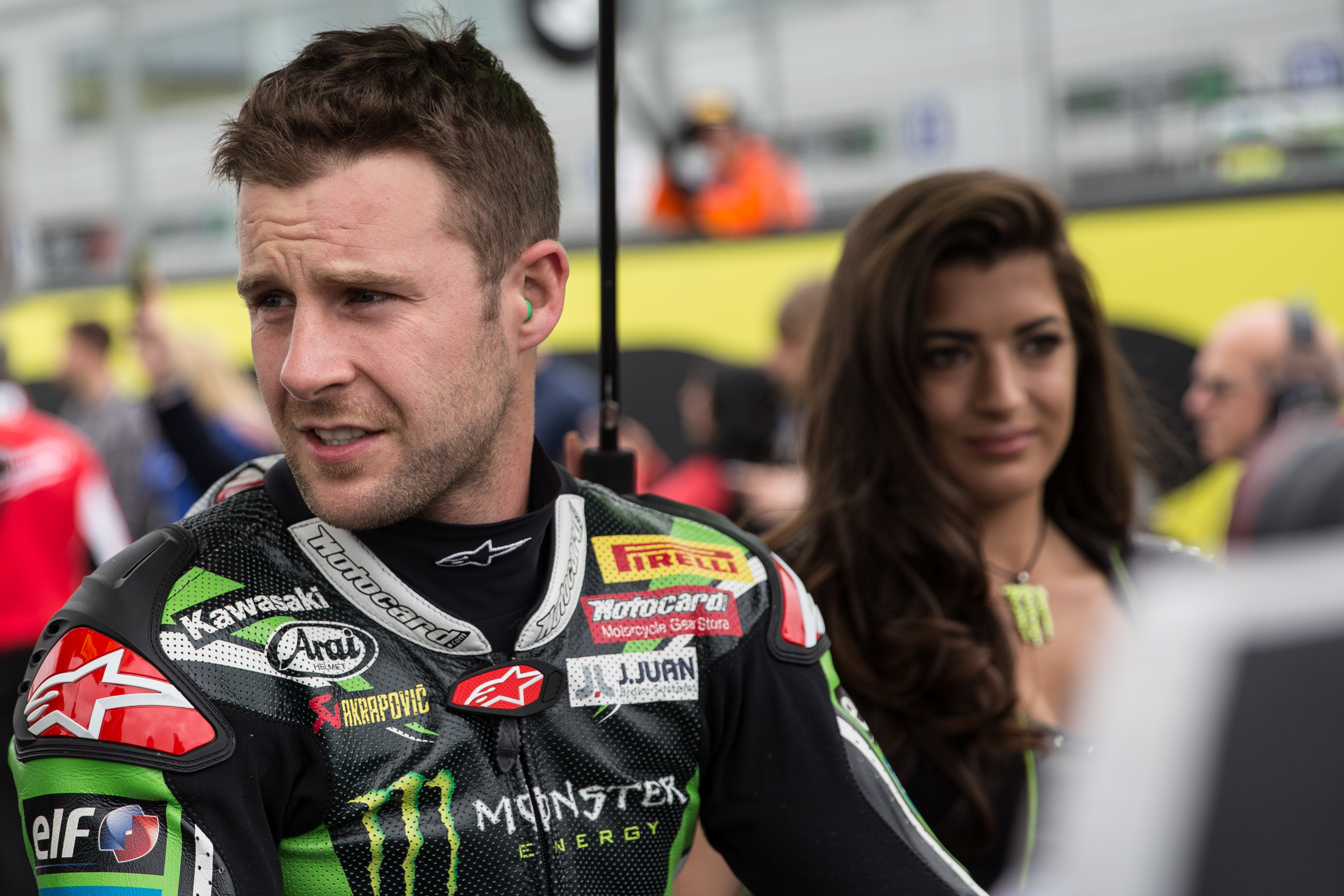
Jonathan Rea won his third Superbike world title, by winning the Magny-Cours Race 1. His victory gave him an unassailable lead with five races remaining.

The 2017 Superbike World Championship was the 30th season of the Superbike World Championship. The season was contested over 26 races at 13 locations, starting on 25 February at Phillip Island Grand Prix Circuit in Australia and ending on 4 November at Losail International Circuit in Qatar.

The season saw the revision of the starting grid format for the second race, which was previously based on qualifying results for both races: riders placed from fourth to ninth in Race 1 were promoted to the first two rows for Race 2; then the third, the second and the winner followed on the third row; the remaining riders were sorted from the tenth grid slot onwards according to Superpole results.

== Race calendar and results ==
2017 Superbike World Championship Calendar
Round			Circuit	Date	Superpole	Fastest lap	Winning rider	Winning team
1	R1	(Australia) Australian	Phillip Island Grand Prix Circuit	25 February	(United Kingdom) Jonathan Rea	(United Kingdom) Jonathan Rea	(United Kingdom) Jonathan Rea	Kawasaki Racing Team
1	R2	(Australia) Australian	Phillip Island Grand Prix Circuit	26 February		(Italy) Marco Melandri	(United Kingdom) Jonathan Rea	Kawasaki Racing Team
2	R1	(Thailand) Thai	Chang International Circuit	11 March	(United Kingdom) Jonathan Rea	(United Kingdom) Jonathan Rea	(United Kingdom) Jonathan Rea	Kawasaki Racing Team
2	R2	(Thailand) Thai	Chang International Circuit	12 March		(Italy) Marco Melandri	(United Kingdom) Jonathan Rea	Kawasaki Racing Team
3	R1	(Spain) Aragón	MotorLand Aragón	1 April	(United Kingdom) Chaz Davies	(United Kingdom) Jonathan Rea	(United Kingdom) Jonathan Rea	Kawasaki Racing Team
3	R2	(Spain) Aragón	MotorLand Aragón	2 April		(United Kingdom) Chaz Davies	(United Kingdom) Chaz Davies	Aruba.it Racing – Ducati
4	R1	(Netherlands) Dutch	TT Circuit Assen	29 April	(United Kingdom) Jonathan Rea	(United Kingdom) Jonathan Rea	(United Kingdom) Jonathan Rea	Kawasaki Racing Team
4	R2	(Netherlands) Dutch	TT Circuit Assen	30 April		(United Kingdom) Jonathan Rea	(United Kingdom) Jonathan Rea	Kawasaki Racing Team
5	R1	(Italy) Italian	Autodromo Enzo e Dino Ferrari	13 May	(United Kingdom) Chaz Davies	(United Kingdom) Chaz Davies	(United Kingdom) Chaz Davies	Aruba.it Racing – Ducati
5	R2	(Italy) Italian	Autodromo Enzo e Dino Ferrari	14 May		(United Kingdom) Chaz Davies	(United Kingdom) Chaz Davies	Aruba.it Racing – Ducati
6	R1	(United Kingdom) UK	Donington Park	27 May	(United Kingdom) Tom Sykes	(United Kingdom) Jonathan Rea	(United Kingdom) Tom Sykes	Kawasaki Racing Team
6	R2	(United Kingdom) UK	Donington Park	28 May		(United Kingdom) Tom Sykes	(United Kingdom) Jonathan Rea	Kawasaki Racing Team
7	R1	(Italy) Riviera di Rimini	Misano World Circuit Marco Simoncelli	17 June	(United Kingdom) Tom Sykes	(Netherlands) Michael van der Mark	(United Kingdom) Tom Sykes	Kawasaki Racing Team
7	R2	(Italy) Riviera di Rimini	Misano World Circuit Marco Simoncelli	18 June		(United Kingdom) Jonathan Rea	(Italy) Marco Melandri	Aruba.it Racing – Ducati
8	R1	(United States) US	Mazda Raceway Laguna Seca	8 July	(United Kingdom) Tom Sykes	(United Kingdom) Jonathan Rea	(United Kingdom) Chaz Davies	Aruba.it Racing – Ducati
8	R2	(United States) US	Mazda Raceway Laguna Seca	9 July		(United Kingdom) Jonathan Rea	(United Kingdom) Jonathan Rea	Kawasaki Racing Team
9	R1	(Germany) German	Lausitzring	19 August	(United Kingdom) Tom Sykes	(United Kingdom) Tom Sykes	(United Kingdom) Chaz Davies	Aruba.it Racing – Ducati
9	R2	(Germany) German	Lausitzring	20 August		(United Kingdom) Chaz Davies	(United Kingdom) Chaz Davies	Aruba.it Racing – Ducati
10	R1	(Portugal) Portuguese	Algarve International Circuit	16 September	(United Kingdom) Jonathan Rea	(United Kingdom) Jonathan Rea	(United Kingdom) Jonathan Rea	Kawasaki Racing Team
10	R2	(Portugal) Portuguese	Algarve International Circuit	17 September		(United Kingdom) Jonathan Rea	(United Kingdom) Jonathan Rea	Kawasaki Racing Team
11	R1	(France) French	Circuit de Nevers Magny-Cours	30 September	(United Kingdom) Jonathan Rea	(Italy) Marco Melandri	(United Kingdom) Jonathan Rea	Kawasaki Racing Team
11	R2	(France) French	Circuit de Nevers Magny-Cours	1 October		(United Kingdom) Chaz Davies	(United Kingdom) Chaz Davies	Aruba.it Racing – Ducati
12	R1	(Spain) Spanish	Circuito de Jerez	21 October	(Italy) Marco Melandri	(Italy) Marco Melandri	(United Kingdom) Jonathan Rea	Kawasaki Racing Team
12	R2	(Spain) Spanish	Circuito de Jerez	22 October		(United Kingdom) Jonathan Rea	(United Kingdom) Jonathan Rea	Kawasaki Racing Team
13	R1	Qatar	Losail International Circuit	3 November	(United Kingdom) Jonathan Rea	(United Kingdom) Jonathan Rea	(United Kingdom) Jonathan Rea	Kawasaki Racing Team
13	R2	Qatar	Losail International Circuit	4 November		(United Kingdom) Jonathan Rea	(United Kingdom) Jonathan Rea	Kawasaki Racing Team

== Entry list ==
2017 entry list
Team	Constructor	Motorcycle	No.	Rider	Rounds
(Japan) Kawasaki Racing Team	Kawasaki	Kawasaki ZX-10RR	1	(United Kingdom) Jonathan Rea	All
(Japan) Kawasaki Racing Team	Kawasaki	Kawasaki ZX-10RR	66	(United Kingdom) Tom Sykes	All
(Italy) MV Agusta Reparto Corse	MV Agusta	MV Agusta 1000 F4	2	(United Kingdom) Leon Camier	All
(United Kingdom) Milwaukee Aprilia	Aprilia	Aprilia RSV4 RF	3	(Spain) Julián Simón	3
(United Kingdom) Milwaukee Aprilia	Aprilia	Aprilia RSV4 RF	32	(Italy) Lorenzo Savadori	1–2, 4–13
(United Kingdom) Milwaukee Aprilia	Aprilia	Aprilia RSV4 RF	50	(Republic of Ireland) Eugene Laverty	All
(Italy) Kawasaki Puccetti Racing	Kawasaki	Kawasaki ZX-10RR	05	(France) Sylvain Guintoli	12–13
(Italy) Kawasaki Puccetti Racing	Kawasaki	Kawasaki ZX-10RR	13	(Australia) Anthony West	10–11
(Italy) Kawasaki Puccetti Racing	Kawasaki	Kawasaki ZX-10RR	88	(Switzerland) Randy Krummenacher	1–9
(Italy) Kawasaki Puccetti Racing	Kawasaki	Kawasaki ZX-10RR	91	(United Kingdom) Leon Haslam	6
(Netherlands) Red Bull Honda World Superbike Team	Honda	Honda CBR1000RR	6	(Germany) Stefan Bradl	1–10
(Netherlands) Red Bull Honda World Superbike Team	Honda	Honda CBR1000RR	34	(Italy) Davide Giugliano	9, 11–13
(Netherlands) Red Bull Honda World Superbike Team	Honda	Honda CBR1000RR	45	(United States) Jake Gagne	8, 11, 13
(Netherlands) Red Bull Honda World Superbike Team	Honda	Honda CBR1000RR	69	(United States) Nicky Hayden	1–5
(Netherlands) Red Bull Honda World Superbike Team	Honda	Honda CBR1000RR	72	(Japan) Takumi Takahashi	10, 12
(Italy) Aruba.it Racing – Ducati	Ducati	Ducati Panigale R	7	(United Kingdom) Chaz Davies	All
(Italy) Aruba.it Racing – Ducati	Ducati	Ducati Panigale R	33	(Italy) Marco Melandri	All
(Italy) Pedercini Racing SC-Project	Kawasaki	Kawasaki ZX-10RR	11	(France) Jérémy Guarnoni	13
(Italy) Pedercini Racing SC-Project	Kawasaki	Kawasaki ZX-10RR	15	(San Marino) Alex de Angelis	1–8
(Italy) Pedercini Racing SC-Project	Kawasaki	Kawasaki ZX-10RR	84	(Italy) Riccardo Russo	9–12
(Italy) Barni Racing Team	Ducati	Ducati Panigale R	12	(Spain) Javier Forés	All
Pazera Racing	Yamaha	Yamaha YZF-R1	19	(Poland) Paweł Szkopek	9
(Italy) Althea BMW Racing Team	BMW	BMW S1000RR	21	(Germany) Markus Reiterberger	1–3
(Italy) Althea BMW Racing Team	BMW	BMW S1000RR	35	(Italy) Raffaele De Rosa	4–13
(Italy) Althea BMW Racing Team	BMW	BMW S1000RR	81	(Spain) Jordi Torres	All
Van Zon Remeha BMW	BMW	BMW S1000RR	21	(Germany) Markus Reiterberger	9
(Japan) Pata Yamaha Official WorldSBK Team	Yamaha	Yamaha YZF-R1	22	(United Kingdom) Alex Lowes	All
(Japan) Pata Yamaha Official WorldSBK Team	Yamaha	Yamaha YZF-R1	60	(Netherlands) Michael van der Mark	All
(Australia) ERMotorsport-EliteRoads.com.au	Yamaha	Yamaha YZF-R1	25	(Australia) Josh Brookes	1
(United Kingdom) Royal Air Force Reg. & Res. Kawasaki	Kawasaki	Kawasaki ZX-10RR	27	(United Kingdom) Jake Dixon	6
(Italy) IodaRacing	Aprilia	Aprilia RSV4 RF	36	(Argentina) Leandro Mercado	3–12
(Italy) Grillini Racing Team	Kawasaki	Kawasaki ZX-10RR	37	(Czech Republic) Ondřej Ježek	All
(Italy) Grillini Racing Team	Kawasaki	Kawasaki ZX-10RR	44	(Italy) Roberto Rolfo	13
(Italy) Grillini Racing Team	Kawasaki	Kawasaki ZX-10RR	86	(Italy) Ayrton Badovini	1–12
(Italy) Team Kawasaki Go Eleven	Kawasaki	Kawasaki ZX-10RR	40	(Spain) Román Ramos	All
(Italy) Guandalini Racing	Yamaha	Yamaha YZF-R1	55	(Italy) Massimo Roccoli	9
(Italy) Guandalini Racing	Yamaha	Yamaha YZF-R1	84	(Italy) Riccardo Russo	1–7
(Italy) Guandalini Racing	Yamaha	Yamaha YZF-R1	96	(Czech Republic) Jakub Smrž	8
(Italy) Guandalini Racing	Yamaha	Yamaha YZF-R1	121	(Italy) Alessandro Andreozzi	10–13
VFT Racing	Ducati	Ducati Panigale R	61	(Italy) Fabio Menghi	7
Team ASPI	BMW	BMW S1000RR	94	(France) Matthieu Lussiana	11
eighty one HPC-Power Suzuki Racing	Suzuki	Suzuki GSX-R1000	99	(Switzerland) Dominic Schmitter	12

Key
Regular rider
Wildcard rider
Replacement rider

- All entries used Pirelli tyres.

== Championship standings ==
=== Riders' championship ===
Pos.	Rider	Bike	PHI (Australia)		CHA (Thailand)		ARA (Spain)		ASS (Netherlands)		IMO (Italy)		DON (United Kingdom)		MIS (Italy)		LAG (United States)		LAU (Germany)		POR (Portugal)		MAG (France)		JER (Spain)		LOS (Qatar)		Pts
Pos.	Rider	Bike	R1	R2	R1	R2	R1	R2	R1	R2	R1	R2	R1	R2	R1	R2	R1	R2	R1	R2	R1	R2	R1	R2	R1	R2	R1	R2	Pts
1	(United Kingdom) Jonathan Rea	Kawasaki	**1**	1	**1**	1	1	2	**1**	1	2	2	Ret	1	3	2	2	1	2	2	**1**	1	**1**	Ret	1	1	**1**	1	556
2	(United Kingdom) Chaz Davies	Ducati	2	2	2	6	**Ret**	1	Ret	3	**1**	1	8	3	Ret	DNS	1	3	1	1	2	Ret	10	1	2	3	2	2	403
3	(United Kingdom) Tom Sykes	Kawasaki	3	6	3	2	3	4	2	2	4	3	**1**	2	**1**	3	**3**	2	**3**	4	DNS	DNS	3	7	3	5	6	Ret	373
4	(Italy) Marco Melandri	Ducati	Ret	3	4	3	2	3	3	Ret	3	5	4	Ret	15	1	4	4	4	3	3	3	2	5	**Ret**	2	3	6	327
5	(United Kingdom) Alex Lowes	Yamaha	4	4	6	4	4	13	Ret	5	8	6	3	5	2	Ret	Ret	9	6	5	18	Ret	5	2	4	4	Ret	3	242
6	(Netherlands) Michael van der Mark	Yamaha	9	7	5	Ret	5	5	Ret	4	7	9	5	4	Ret	4	8	10	15	11	5	2	9	3	5	6	Ret	4	223
7	(Spain) Javier Forés	Ducati	6	5	11	8	Ret	6	4	13	5	4	10	7	5	Ret	5	5	8	10	9	13	Ret	4	9	7	Ret	5	196
8	(United Kingdom) Leon Camier	MV Agusta	5	8	8	Ret	11	10	10	6	6	Ret	6	6	11	Ret	6	Ret	5	6	4	Ret	4	Ret	12	12	9	9	168
9	(Spain) Jordi Torres	BMW	7	Ret	7	5	6	7	Ret	7	DNS	8	9	Ret	4	Ret	7	Ret	9	8	6	5	14	8	13	10	7	Ret	158
10	(Republic of Ireland) Eugene Laverty	Aprilia	8	10	Ret	15	8	9	8	8	NC	7	13	Ret	6	5	Ret	6	10	Ret	7	4	6	17	8	Ret	4	7	157
11	(Italy) Lorenzo Savadori	Aprilia	Ret	9	13	Ret			5	Ret	12	13	12	Ret	9	6	10	8	7	7	8	6	11	Ret	7	18	5	Ret	124
12	(Spain) Román Ramos	Kawasaki	13	14	15	9	Ret	11	7	11	9	11	11	8	8	Ret	12	12	14	14	10	15	12	9	10	11	10	10	118
13	(Argentina) Leandro Mercado	Aprilia					7	8	9	12	Ret	10	7	Ret	Ret	9	9	7	11	12	Ret	7	7	6	11	9			115
14	(Germany) Stefan Bradl	Honda	15	15	10	Ret	9	12	6	10	10	14	Ret	11	NC	10	11	11	DNS	13	Ret	DNS							67
15	(Italy) Raffaele De Rosa	BMW							13	17	14	16	15	10	10	7	13	Ret	Ret	15	11	Ret	13	10	Ret	13	Ret	11	53
16	(Switzerland) Randy Krummenacher	Kawasaki	10	16	12	Ret	14	14	11	14	13	15	14	Ret	7	8	17	14	12	Ret									50
17	(United States) Nicky Hayden	Honda	11	Ret	9	7	10	Ret	14	9	Ret	12																	40
18	(France) Sylvain Guintoli	Kawasaki																							6	8	8	8	34
19	(San Marino) Alex de Angelis	Kawasaki	14	11	16	11	15	Ret	12	15	11	Ret	17	Ret	12	Ret	14	13											32
20	(Germany) Markus Reiterberger	BMW	12	13	14	10	12	16											13	9									29
21	(Italy) Ayrton Badovini	Kawasaki	17	Ret	Ret	14	Ret	17	15	16	15	Ret	16	14	13	11	16	Ret	16	18	12	9	DNS	15	Ret	DNS			26
22	(Czech Republic) Ondřej Ježek	Kawasaki	18	17	18	13	DNS	DNS	16	18	16	17	18	13	14	12	19	17	Ret	16	16	11	16	18	15	Ret	14	14	22
23	(United Kingdom) Leon Haslam	Kawasaki											2	Ret															20
24	(United States) Jake Gagne	Honda															15	15					Ret	12			12	12	14
25	(Italy) Alessandro Andreozzi	Yamaha																			17	12	17	13	14	14	Ret	13	14
26	(Italy) Davide Giugliano	Honda																	Ret	17			8	11	Ret	17	Ret	DNS	13
27	(Australia) Anthony West	Kawasaki																			13	8	18	14					13
28	(Italy) Riccardo Russo	Yamaha	16	Ret	17	12	16	Ret	Ret	Ret	Ret	Ret	Ret	12	Ret	DNS													13
28	(Italy) Riccardo Russo	Kawasaki																	Ret	Ret	14	14	15	16	17	16			13
29	(Japan) Takumi Takahashi	Honda																			15	10			16	15			8
30	(United Kingdom) Jake Dixon	Kawasaki											Ret	9															7
31	(France) Jérémy Guarnoni	Kawasaki																									11	16	5
32	(Australia) Josh Brookes	Yamaha	Ret	12																									4
33	(Italy) Roberto Rolfo	Kawasaki																									13	15	4
34	(Spain) Julián Simón	Aprilia					13	15																					4
	(Czech Republic) Jakub Smrž	Yamaha															18	16											0
	(Italy) Massimo Roccoli	Yamaha																	Ret	19									0
	(Switzerland) Dominic Schmitter	Suzuki																							Ret	Ret			0
	(Poland) Paweł Szkopek	Yamaha																	Ret	Ret									0
	(Italy) Fabio Menghi	Ducati													Ret	Ret													0
	(France) Matthieu Lussiana	BMW																					DNS	DNS					0
Pos.	Rider	Bike	PHI (Australia)		CHA (Thailand)		ARA (Spain)		ASS (Netherlands)		IMO (Italy)		DON (United Kingdom)		MIS (Italy)		LAG (United States)		LAU (Germany)		POR (Portugal)		MAG (France)		JER (Spain)		LOS (Qatar)		Pts

Colour	Result
Gold	Winner
Silver	Second place
Bronze	Third place
Green	Points classification
Blue	Non-points classification
Blue	Non-classified finish (NC)
Purple	Retired, not classified (Ret)
Red	Did not qualify (DNQ)
Red	Did not pre-qualify (DNPQ)
Black	Disqualified (DSQ)
White	Did not start (DNS)
White	Withdrew (WD)
White	Race cancelled (C)
Blank	Did not practice (DNP)
Blank	Did not arrive (DNA)
Blank	Excluded (EX)

**Bold** – Pole position
Italics – Fastest lap

=== Teams' championship ===
Pos.	Team	Bike No.	PHI (Australia)		CHA (Thailand)		ARA (Spain)		ASS (Netherlands)		IMO (Italy)		DON (United Kingdom)		MIS (Italy)		LAG (United States)		LAU (Germany)		POR (Portugal)		MAG (France)		JER (Spain)		LOS (Qatar)		Pts.
Pos.	Team	Bike No.	R1	R2	R1	R2	R1	R2	R1	R2	R1	R2	R1	R2	R1	R2	R1	R2	R1	R2	R1	R2	R1	R2	R1	R2	R1	R2	Pts.
1	(Japan) Kawasaki Racing Team	1	**1**	1	**1**	1	1	2	**1**	1	2	2	Ret	1	3	2	2	1	2	2	**1**	1	**1**	Ret	1	1	**1**	1	929
1	(Japan) Kawasaki Racing Team	66	3	6	3	2	3	4	2	2	4	3	**1**	2	**1**	3	**3**	2	**3**	4	DNS	DNS	3	7	3	5	6	Ret	929
2	(Italy) Aruba.it Racing – Ducati	7	2	2	2	6	**Ret**	1	Ret	3	**1**	1	8	3	Ret	DNS	1	3	1	1	2	Ret	10	1	2	3	2	2	730
2	(Italy) Aruba.it Racing – Ducati	33	Ret	3	4	3	2	3	3	Ret	3	5	4	Ret	15	1	4	4	4	3	3	3	2	5	**Ret**	2	3	6	730
3	(Japan) Pata Yamaha Official WorldSBK Team	22	4	4	6	4	4	13	Ret	5	8	6	3	5	2	Ret	Ret	9	6	5	18	Ret	5	2	4	4	Ret	3	465
3	(Japan) Pata Yamaha Official WorldSBK Team	60	9	7	5	Ret	5	5	Ret	4	7	9	5	4	Ret	4	8	10	15	11	5	2	9	3	5	6	Ret	4	465
4	(United Kingdom) Milwaukee Aprilia	50	8	10	Ret	15	8	9	8	8	NC	7	13	Ret	6	5	Ret	6	10	Ret	7	4	6	17	8	Ret	4	7	285
4	(United Kingdom) Milwaukee Aprilia	32	Ret	9	13	Ret			5	Ret	12	13	12	Ret	9	6	10	8	7	7	8	6	11	Ret	7	18	5	Ret	285
4	(United Kingdom) Milwaukee Aprilia	3					13	15																					285
5	(Italy) Althea BMW Racing Team	81	7	Ret	7	5	6	7	Ret	7	DNS	8	9	Ret	4	Ret	7	Ret	9	8	6	5	14	8	13	10	7	Ret	230
5	(Italy) Althea BMW Racing Team	35							13	17	14	16	15	10	10	7	13	Ret	Ret	15	11	Ret	13	10	Ret	13	Ret	11	230
5	(Italy) Althea BMW Racing Team	21	12	13	14	10	12	16																					230
6	(Italy) Barni Racing Team	12	6	5	11	8	Ret	6	4	13	5	4	10	7	5	Ret	5	5	8	10	9	13	Ret	4	9	7	Ret	5	196
7	(Italy) MV Agusta Reparto Corse	2	5	8	8	Ret	11	10	10	6	6	Ret	6	6	11	Ret	6	Ret	5	6	4	Ret	4	Ret	12	12	9	9	168
8	(Netherlands) Red Bull Honda World Superbike Team	6	15	15	10	Ret	9	12	6	10	10	14	Ret	11	NC	10	11	11	DNS	13	Ret	DNS							142
8	(Netherlands) Red Bull Honda World Superbike Team	69	11	Ret	9	7	10	Ret	14	9	Ret	12																	142
8	(Netherlands) Red Bull Honda World Superbike Team	45															15	15					Ret	12			12	12	142
8	(Netherlands) Red Bull Honda World Superbike Team	34																	Ret	17			8	11	Ret	17	Ret	DNS	142
8	(Netherlands) Red Bull Honda World Superbike Team	72																			15	10			16	15			142
9	(Italy) Team Kawasaki Go Eleven	40	13	14	15	9	Ret	11	7	11	9	11	11	8	8	Ret	12	12	14	14	10	15	12	9	10	11	10	10	118
10	(Italy) Kawasaki Puccetti Racing	88	10	16	12	Ret	14	14	11	14	13	15	14	Ret	7	8	17	14	12	Ret									117
10	(Italy) Kawasaki Puccetti Racing	05																							6	8	8	8	117
10	(Italy) Kawasaki Puccetti Racing	91											2	Ret															117
10	(Italy) Kawasaki Puccetti Racing	13																			13	8	18	14					117
11	(Italy) IodaRacing	36					7	8	9	12	Ret	10	7	Ret	Ret	9	9	7	11	12	Ret	7	7	6	11	9			115
12	(Italy) Grillini Racing Team	86	17	Ret	Ret	14	Ret	17	15	16	15	Ret	16	14	13	11	16	Ret	16	18	12	9	DNS	15	Ret	DNS			52
12	(Italy) Grillini Racing Team	37	18	17	18	13	DNS	DNS	16	18	16	17	18	13	14	12	19	17	Ret	16	16	11	16	18	15	Ret	14	14	52
12	(Italy) Grillini Racing Team	44																									13	15	52
13	(Italy) Pedercini Racing SC-Project	15	14	11	16	11	15	Ret	12	15	11	Ret	17	Ret	12	Ret	14	13											42
13	(Italy) Pedercini Racing SC-Project	11																									11	16	42
13	(Italy) Pedercini Racing SC-Project	84																	Ret	Ret	14	14	15	16	17	16			42
14	(Italy) Guandalini Racing	121																			17	12	17	13	14	14	Ret	13	22
14	(Italy) Guandalini Racing	84	16	Ret	17	12	16	Ret	Ret	Ret	Ret	Ret	Ret	12	Ret	DNS													22
14	(Italy) Guandalini Racing	96															18	16											22
14	(Italy) Guandalini Racing	55																	Ret	19									22
15	(United Kingdom) Royal Air Force Reg. & Res. Kawasaki	27											Ret	9															7
16	(Australia) ERMotorsport-EliteRoads.com.au	25	Ret	12																									4
	(Italy) VFT Racing	61													Ret	Ret													0
	(Poland) Pazera Racing	19																	Ret	Ret									0
	(Switzerland) eighty one HPC-Power Suzuki Racing	99																							Ret	Ret			0
	(France) Team ASPI	94																					DNS	DNS					0
Pos.	Team	Bike No.	PHI (Australia)		CHA (Thailand)		ARA (Spain)		ASS (Netherlands)		IMO (Italy)		DON (United Kingdom)		MIS (Italy)		LAG (United States)		LAU (Germany)		POR (Portugal)		MAG (France)		JER (Spain)		LOS (Qatar)		Pts.

=== Manufacturers' championship ===
Pos.	Manufacturer	PHI (Australia)		CHA (Thailand)		ARA (Spain)		ASS (Netherlands)		IMO (Italy)		DON (United Kingdom)		MIS (Italy)		LAG (United States)		LAU (Germany)		POR (Portugal)		MAG (France)		JER (Spain)		LOS (Qatar)		Pts
Pos.	Manufacturer	R1	R2	R1	R2	R1	R2	R1	R2	R1	R2	R1	R2	R1	R2	R1	R2	R1	R2	R1	R2	R1	R2	R1	R2	R1	R2	Pts
1	(Japan) Kawasaki	1	1	1	1	1	2	1	1	2	2	1	1	1	2	2	1	2	2	1	1	1	7	1	1	1	1	599
2	(Italy) Ducati	2	2	2	3	2	1	3	3	1	1	4	3	5	1	1	3	1	1	2	3	2	1	2	2	2	2	520
3	(Japan) Yamaha	4	4	5	4	4	5	Ret	4	7	6	3	4	2	4	8	9	6	5	5	2	5	2	4	4	Ret	3	308
4	(Italy) Aprilia	8	9	13	15	7	8	5	8	12	7	7	Ret	6	5	9	6	7	7	7	4	6	6	7	9	4	7	213
5	(Germany) BMW	7	13	7	5	6	7	13	7	14	8	9	10	4	7	7	Ret	9	8	6	5	13	8	13	10	7	11	187
6	(Italy) MV Agusta	5	8	8	Ret	11	10	10	6	6	Ret	6	6	11	Ret	6	Ret	5	6	4	Ret	4	Ret	12	12	9	9	168
7	(Japan) Honda	11	15	9	7	9	12	6	9	10	12	Ret	11	NC	10	11	11	Ret	13	15	10	8	11	16	15	12	12	113
	(Japan) Suzuki																							Ret	Ret			0
Pos.	Manufacturer	PHI (Australia)		CHA (Thailand)		ARA (Spain)		ASS (Netherlands)		IMO (Italy)		DON (United Kingdom)		MIS (Italy)		LAG (United States)		LAU (Germany)		POR (Portugal)		MAG (France)		JER (Spain)		LOS (Qatar)		Pts
