= 2018 Superbike World Championship =

2018 Superbike World Championship
| Previous: | 2017 | Next: | 2019 |
Support series: Supersport World Championship; Supersport 300 World Championship; European Superstock 1000 Championship

The 2018 Superbike World Championship was the 31st season of the Superbike World Championship.

2018 was the final season run with the two-race format, as a three-race format was introduced for 2019.

== Race calendar and results ==
2018 Superbike World Championship Calendar
| Round | | | Circuit | Date | Superpole | Fastest lap | Winning rider | Winning team |
|---|---|---|---|---|---|---|---|---|
| 1 | R1 | (Australia) Australian | Phillip Island Grand Prix Circuit | 24 February | (United Kingdom) Tom Sykes | (United Kingdom) Tom Sykes | (Italy) Marco Melandri | Aruba.it Racing – Ducati |
| 1 | R2 | (Australia) Australian | Phillip Island Grand Prix Circuit | 25 February | | (Italy) Marco Melandri | (Italy) Marco Melandri | Aruba.it Racing – Ducati |
| 2 | R1 | (Thailand) Thai | Chang International Circuit | 24 March | (United Kingdom) Jonathan Rea | (United Kingdom) Jonathan Rea | (United Kingdom) Jonathan Rea | Kawasaki Racing Team WorldSBK |
| 2 | R2 | (Thailand) Thai | Chang International Circuit | 25 March | | (United Kingdom) Chaz Davies | (United Kingdom) Chaz Davies | Aruba.it Racing – Ducati |
| 3 | R1 | (Spain) Aragón | Motorland Aragón | 14 April | (Italy) Marco Melandri | (Italy) Marco Melandri | (United Kingdom) Jonathan Rea | Kawasaki Racing Team WorldSBK |
| 3 | R2 | (Spain) Aragón | Motorland Aragón | 15 April | | (Italy) Marco Melandri | (United Kingdom) Chaz Davies | Aruba.it Racing – Ducati |
| 4 | R1 | (Netherlands) Dutch | TT Circuit Assen | 21 April | (United Kingdom) Alex Lowes | (Netherlands) Michael van der Mark | (United Kingdom) Jonathan Rea | Kawasaki Racing Team WorldSBK |
| 4 | R2 | (Netherlands) Dutch | TT Circuit Assen | 22 April | | (United Kingdom) Tom Sykes | (United Kingdom) Tom Sykes | Kawasaki Racing Team WorldSBK |
| 5 | R1 | (Italy) Italian | Autodromo Enzo e Dino Ferrari | 12 May | (United Kingdom) Jonathan Rea | (United Kingdom) Jonathan Rea | (United Kingdom) Jonathan Rea | Kawasaki Racing Team WorldSBK |
| 5 | R2 | (Italy) Italian | Autodromo Enzo e Dino Ferrari | 13 May | | (United Kingdom) Jonathan Rea | (United Kingdom) Jonathan Rea | Kawasaki Racing Team WorldSBK |
| 6 | R1 | (United Kingdom) UK | Donington Park | 26 May | (United Kingdom) Tom Sykes | (United Kingdom) Jonathan Rea | (Netherlands) Michael van der Mark | Pata Yamaha Official WorldSBK Team |
| 6 | R2 | (United Kingdom) UK | Donington Park | 27 May | | (United Kingdom) Jonathan Rea | (Netherlands) Michael van der Mark | Pata Yamaha Official WorldSBK Team |
| 7 | R1 | (Czech Republic) Czech | Brno Circuit | 9 June | (United Kingdom) Tom Sykes | (United Kingdom) Jonathan Rea | (United Kingdom) Jonathan Rea | Kawasaki Racing Team WorldSBK |
| 7 | R2 | (Czech Republic) Czech | Brno Circuit | 10 June | | (Italy) Marco Melandri | (United Kingdom) Alex Lowes | Pata Yamaha Official WorldSBK Team |
| 8 | R1 | (United States) US | WeatherTech Raceway Laguna Seca | 23 June | (United Kingdom) Chaz Davies | (United Kingdom) Chaz Davies | (United Kingdom) Jonathan Rea | Kawasaki Racing Team WorldSBK |
| 8 | R2 | (United States) US | WeatherTech Raceway Laguna Seca | 24 June | | (United Kingdom) Jonathan Rea | (United Kingdom) Jonathan Rea | Kawasaki Racing Team WorldSBK |
| 9 | R1 | (Italy) Riviera di Rimini | Misano World Circuit Marco Simoncelli | 7 July | (United Kingdom) Tom Sykes | (United Kingdom) Jonathan Rea | (United Kingdom) Jonathan Rea | Kawasaki Racing Team WorldSBK |
| 9 | R2 | (Italy) Riviera di Rimini | Misano World Circuit Marco Simoncelli | 8 July | | (United Kingdom) Jonathan Rea | (United Kingdom) Jonathan Rea | Kawasaki Racing Team WorldSBK |
| 10 | R1 | (Portugal) Portuguese | Algarve International Circuit | 15 September | (Republic of Ireland) Eugene Laverty | (United Kingdom) Jonathan Rea | (United Kingdom) Jonathan Rea | Kawasaki Racing Team WorldSBK |
| 10 | R2 | (Portugal) Portuguese | Algarve International Circuit | 16 September | | (Italy) Marco Melandri | (United Kingdom) Jonathan Rea | Kawasaki Racing Team WorldSBK |
| 11 | R1 | (France) French | Circuit de Nevers Magny-Cours | 29 September | (United Kingdom) Tom Sykes | (United Kingdom) Jonathan Rea | (United Kingdom) Jonathan Rea | Kawasaki Racing Team WorldSBK |
| 11 | R2 | (France) French | Circuit de Nevers Magny-Cours | 30 September | | (United Kingdom) Chaz Davies | (United Kingdom) Jonathan Rea | Kawasaki Racing Team WorldSBK |
| 12 | R1 | (Argentina) Argentinian | Circuito San Juan Villicum | 13 October | (Italy) Marco Melandri | (United Kingdom) Jonathan Rea | (United Kingdom) Jonathan Rea | Kawasaki Racing Team WorldSBK |
| 12 | R2 | (Argentina) Argentinian | Circuito San Juan Villicum | 14 October | | (United Kingdom) Jonathan Rea | (United Kingdom) Jonathan Rea | Kawasaki Racing Team WorldSBK |
| 13 | R1 | Qatar | Losail International Circuit | 26 October | (United Kingdom) Tom Sykes | (United Kingdom) Jonathan Rea | (United Kingdom) Jonathan Rea | Kawasaki Racing Team WorldSBK |
| 13 | R2 | Qatar | Losail International Circuit | 27 October | | Race cancelled | | |

== Entry list ==
2018 entry list
| Team | Constructor | Motorcycle | No. | Rider | Rounds |
|---|---|---|---|---|---|
| (Japan) Kawasaki Racing Team WorldSBK | Kawasaki | Kawasaki ZX-10RR | 1 | (United Kingdom) Jonathan Rea | All |
| (Japan) Kawasaki Racing Team WorldSBK | Kawasaki | Kawasaki ZX-10RR | 66 | (United Kingdom) Tom Sykes | All |
| (Netherlands) Red Bull Honda World Superbike Team | Honda | Honda CBR1000RR | 2 | (United Kingdom) Leon Camier | 1–3, 6–13 (Note: Leon Camier was also entered into round 5 but was replaced by Jason O'Halloran after two practice sessions due to injury.) |
| (Netherlands) Red Bull Honda World Superbike Team | Honda | Honda CBR1000RR | 20 | (Australia) Jason O'Halloran | 5 |
| (Netherlands) Red Bull Honda World Superbike Team | Honda | Honda CBR1000RR | 45 | (United States) Jacob Gagne | All |
| SPB Racing Team | Kawasaki | Kawasaki ZX-10RR | 5 | (Russia) Vladimir Leonov | 3, 5 |
| (Italy) Aruba.it Racing – Ducati | Ducati | Ducati Panigale R | 7 | (United Kingdom) Chaz Davies | All |
| (Italy) Aruba.it Racing – Ducati | Ducati | Ducati Panigale R | 33 | (Italy) Marco Melandri | All |
| (Italy) Team Pedercini Racing | Kawasaki | Kawasaki ZX-10RR | 11 | (France) Jérémy Guarnoni | 11 |
| (Italy) Team Pedercini Racing | Kawasaki | Kawasaki ZX-10RR | 16 | (Italy) Gabriele Ruiu | 12–13 |
| (Italy) Team Pedercini Racing | Kawasaki | Kawasaki ZX-10RR | 41 | (United Kingdom) Luke Mossey | 6 |
| (Italy) Team Pedercini Racing | Kawasaki | Kawasaki ZX-10RR | 68 | (Colombia) Yonny Hernández | 1–5, 7–10 |
| (Italy) Barni Racing Team | Ducati | Ducati Panigale R | 12 | (Spain) Javier Forés | All |
| (Australia) Penrite Honda | Honda | Honda CBR1000RR | 17 | (Australia) Troy Herfoss | 1 |
| (Italy) Aruba.it Racing – Junior Team | Ducati | Ducati Panigale R | 21 | (Italy) Michael Ruben Rinaldi | 3–7, 9–11 |
| (Japan) Pata Yamaha Official WorldSBK Team | Yamaha | Yamaha YZF-R1 | 22 | (United Kingdom) Alex Lowes | All |
| (Japan) Pata Yamaha Official WorldSBK Team | Yamaha | Yamaha YZF-R1 | 60 | (Netherlands) Michael van der Mark | All |
| (Italy) Guandalini Racing | Yamaha | Yamaha YZF-R1 | 24 | (Italy) Alessandro Andreozzi | 9 |
| (Italy) Guandalini Racing | Yamaha | Yamaha YZF-R1 | 37 | (Czech Republic) Ondřej Ježek | 1–7 |
| (Italy) Guandalini Racing | Yamaha | Yamaha YZF-R1 | 96 | (Czech Republic) Jakub Smrž | 10–13 |
| (Italy) Guandalini Racing | Yamaha | Yamaha YZF-R1 | 98 | (Czech Republic) Karel Hanika | 8 |
| Yamaha Racing Team | Yamaha | Yamaha YZF-R1 | 25 | (Australia) Daniel Falzon | 1 |
| Yamaha Racing Team | Yamaha | Yamaha YZF-R1 | 47 | (Australia) Wayne Maxwell | 1 |
| (United Kingdom) Buildbase Suzuki | Suzuki | Suzuki GSX-R1000 | 28 | (United Kingdom) Bradley Ray | 6 |
| (United Kingdom) Milwaukee Aprilia | Aprilia | Aprilia RSV4 RF | 32 | (Italy) Lorenzo Savadori | All |
| (United Kingdom) Milwaukee Aprilia | Aprilia | Aprilia RSV4 RF | 34 | (Italy) Davide Giugliano | 3–4 |
| (United Kingdom) Milwaukee Aprilia | Aprilia | Aprilia RSV4 RF | 50 | (Republic of Ireland) Eugene Laverty | 1–2, 5–13 |
| (Spain) Orelac Racing VerdNatura | Kawasaki | Kawasaki ZX-10RR | 36 | (Argentina) Leandro Mercado | All |
| (Italy) Team GoEleven Kawasaki | Kawasaki | Kawasaki ZX-10RR | 40 | (Spain) Román Ramos | All |
| (United Kingdom) OMG Racing UK | Suzuki | Suzuki GSX-R1000 | 44 | (United Kingdom) Gino Rea | 6 |
| TripleM Honda World Superbike Team | Honda | Honda CBR1000RR | 51 | (France) Florian Marino | 12 |
| TripleM Honda World Superbike Team | Honda | Honda CBR1000RR | 99 | (United States) Patrick Jacobsen | 1–11 |
| (Italy) Kawasaki Puccetti Racing | Kawasaki | Kawasaki ZX-10RR | 54 | (Turkey) Toprak Razgatlıoğlu | All |
| (Italy) Kawasaki Puccetti Racing | Kawasaki | Kawasaki ZX-10RR | 91 | (United Kingdom) Leon Haslam | 5–6 |
| (United Kingdom) Team WD40 | Kawasaki | Kawasaki ZX-10RR | 55 | (United Kingdom) Mason Law | 6 |
| (United States) Attack 2Wheel Legal Yamaha | Yamaha | Yamaha YZF-R1 | 57 | (United States) Josh Herrin | 8 |
| (Italy) Gulf Althea BMW Racing Team | BMW | BMW S1000RR | 76 | (France) Loris Baz | All |
| (Italy) MV Agusta Reparto Corse | MV Agusta | MV Agusta 1000 F4 | 77 | (Chile) Maximilian Scheib | 12–13 |
| (Italy) MV Agusta Reparto Corse | MV Agusta | MV Agusta 1000 F4 | 81 | (Spain) Jordi Torres | 1–11 |
| Yamaha Motor Europe | Yamaha | Yamaha YZF-R1 | 94 | (Italy) Niccolò Canepa | 6, 9 |
| Dreamteamcompany | Aprilia | Aprilia RSV4 RF | 121 | (France) Matthieu Lussiana | 11 |

Key
Regular rider
Wildcard rider
Replacement rider

- All entries used Pirelli tyres.

== Championship standings ==
=== Riders' championship ===
| Pos. | Rider | Bike | PHI (Australia) | | CHA (Thailand) | | ARA (Spain) | | ASS (Netherlands) | | IMO (Italy) | | DON (United Kingdom) | | BRN (Czech Republic) | | LAG (United States) | | MIS (Italy) | | POR (Portugal) | | MAG (France) | | VIL (Argentina) | | LOS (Qatar) | | Pts |
| Pos. | Rider | Bike | R1 | R2 | R1 | R2 | R1 | R2 | R1 | R2 | R1 | R2 | R1 | R2 | R1 | R2 | R1 | R2 | R1 | R2 | R1 | R2 | R1 | R2 | R1 | R2 | R1 | R2 | Pts |
|---|---|---|---|---|---|---|---|---|---|---|---|---|---|---|---|---|---|---|---|---|---|---|---|---|---|---|---|---|---|
| 1 | (United Kingdom) Jonathan Rea | Kawasaki | 5 | 2 | **1** | 4 | 1 | 2 | 1 | 2 | **1** | 1 | 2 | 3 | 1 | Ret | 1 | 1 | 1 | 1 | 1 | 1 | 1 | 1 | 1 | 1 | 1 | C | 545 |
| 2 | (United Kingdom) Chaz Davies | Ducati | 3 | Ret | 3 | 1 | 2 | 1 | 3 | 5 | 4 | 2 | 8 | 5 | 8 | 3 | **2** | 2 | 2 | 4 | 4 | 4 | 5 | 2 | Ret | 4 | 8 | C | 356 |
| 3 | (Netherlands) Michael van der Mark | Yamaha | 9 | 7 | 7 | 2 | 5 | 5 | 2 | 3 | 6 | Ret | 1 | 1 | 4 | 2 | 8 | 5 | 4 | 2 | 3 | 2 | 7 | 3 | 8 | 9 | 7 | C | 333 |
| 4 | (United Kingdom) Tom Sykes | Kawasaki | **2** | 4 | 6 | Ret | 6 | 6 | 4 | 1 | 2 | 3 | **3** | 6 | **3** | 16 | 7 | 8 | **5** | 5 | 5 | 5 | **2** | 4 | 6 | 5 | **2** | C | 314 |
| 5 | (Italy) Marco Melandri | Ducati | 1 | 1 | 8 | 7 | **4** | 3 | 6 | 7 | 3 | Ret | 22 | 11 | 2 | 15 | 5 | Ret | 7 | 3 | 2 | 3 | 6 | 5 | **2** | 3 | 5 | C | 297 |
| 6 | (United Kingdom) Alex Lowes | Yamaha | 6 | 5 | 5 | 3 | 7 | 4 | **12** | 14 | 10 | 6 | 4 | 4 | 5 | 1 | 3 | 4 | Ret | 6 | 10 | 11 | 18 | 7 | 7 | 6 | 3 | C | 248 |
| 7 | (Spain) Javier Forés | Ducati | 4 | 3 | 2 | 5 | 3 | Ret | 5 | 4 | 5 | 4 | Ret | Ret | 14 | 8 | 6 | 6 | 6 | Ret | Ret | 10 | 3 | 8 | 4 | 2 | 13 | C | 230 |
| 8 | (Republic of Ireland) Eugene Laverty | Aprilia | 8 | 15 | 9 | Ret | | | | | 12 | 9 | 6 | Ret | 6 | 4 | 4 | 3 | 3 | 8 | **Ret** | 7 | 9 | 11 | 5 | Ret | 4 | C | 158 |
| 9 | (Turkey) Toprak Razgatlıoğlu | Kawasaki | 13 | 10 | 15 | 8 | 9 | 9 | 10 | 9 | 11 | 8 | 21 | 2 | 10 | 9 | Ret | DNS | 11 | 12 | 8 | Ret | 8 | 12 | 3 | 7 | 10 | C | 151 |
| 10 | (Italy) Lorenzo Savadori | Aprilia | DNS | DNS | 12 | 9 | 15 | 10 | 15 | 10 | 8 | Ret | 5 | 7 | 7 | 5 | 14 | Ret | 8 | 7 | Ret | 6 | 4 | 6 | Ret | 8 | 11 | C | 138 |
| 11 | (France) Loris Baz | BMW | 11 | 9 | 11 | 12 | 11 | 15 | 7 | 8 | 13 | 11 | 7 | 10 | 18 | 11 | 15 | 10 | Ret | 9 | 6 | 9 | 10 | 10 | 9 | 11 | 6 | C | 137 |
| 12 | (United Kingdom) Leon Camier | Honda | 7 | 6 | 4 | 6 | Ret | DNS | | | WD | WD | 10 | 8 | 9 | 7 | Ret | 13 | 9 | 10 | Ret | 14 | 11 | 9 | 10 | Ret | Ret | C | 108 |
| 13 | (Spain) Jordi Torres | MV Agusta | Ret | 8 | 10 | Ret | Ret | 8 | 9 | 6 | 14 | 5 | 11 | 9 | Ret | Ret | 9 | 7 | 18 | Ret | 7 | 13 | 12 | 14 | | | | | 98 |
| 14 | (Italy) Michael Ruben Rinaldi | Ducati | | | | | 8 | 7 | Ret | 12 | 7 | 7 | 12 | Ret | 15 | 6 | | | 17 | 11 | 9 | 8 | Ret | 13 | | | | | 77 |
| 15 | (Argentina) Leandro Mercado | Kawasaki | 10 | 12 | 13 | Ret | Ret | 13 | 8 | Ret | 15 | 10 | 13 | 12 | 12 | 17 | Ret | 11 | 10 | 17 | 11 | 15 | 14 | 15 | Ret | 12 | 12 | C | 70 |
| 16 | (Spain) Román Ramos | Kawasaki | 14 | 11 | 14 | 13 | 10 | 11 | 11 | Ret | Ret | 12 | 19 | Ret | 13 | 10 | 12 | 12 | 13 | 15 | 14 | Ret | 15 | 18 | 12 | 13 | 14 | C | 65 |
| 17 | (United States) Jacob Gagne | Honda | 12 | 13 | 18 | 14 | 12 | 12 | DNS | DNS | 16 | Ret | 16 | 13 | Ret | 12 | 10 | 9 | 14 | 14 | 13 | 12 | 13 | 16 | Ret | 10 | 9 | C | 64 |
| 18 | (Colombia) Yonny Hernández | Kawasaki | Ret | DNS | 16 | 11 | 14 | 16 | 16 | 15 | 17 | 13 | | | 11 | 14 | 11 | 15 | Ret | 16 | 12 | 16 | | | | | | | 28 |
| 19 | (United States) P. J. Jacobsen | Honda | 16 | 14 | 17 | 10 | 16 | 14 | 14 | 13 | Ret | 14 | 15 | 16 | 16 | 13 | Ret | Ret | 16 | Ret | Ret | 17 | 16 | 17 | | | | | 21 |
| 20 | (United Kingdom) Leon Haslam | Kawasaki | | | | | | | | | 9 | 16 | 9 | Ret | | | | | | | | | | | | | | | 14 |
| 21 | (Italy) Davide Giugliano | Aprilia | | | | | 13 | 18 | 13 | 11 | | | | | | | | | | | | | | | | | | | 11 |
| 22 | (Italy) Niccolò Canepa | Yamaha | | | | | | | | | | | 20 | 18 | | | | | 12 | 13 | | | | | | | | | 7 |
| 23 | (France) Florian Marino | Honda | | | | | | | | | | | | | | | | | | | | | | | 11 | Ret | | | 5 |
| 24 | (Czech Republic) Karel Hanika | Yamaha | | | | | | | | | | | | | | | 13 | 14 | | | | | | | | | | | 5 |
| 25 | (Italy) Gabriele Ruiu | Kawasaki | | | | | | | | | | | | | | | | | | | | | | | 14 | 14 | 15 | C | 5 |
| 26 | (Chile) Maximilian Scheib | MV Agusta | | | | | | | | | | | | | | | | | | | | | | | 13 | Ret | Ret | C | 3 |
| 27 | (United Kingdom) Bradley Ray | Suzuki | | | | | | | | | | | 14 | 15 | | | | | | | | | | | | | | | 3 |
| 28 | (United Kingdom) Luke Mossey | Kawasaki | | | | | | | | | | | 17 | 14 | | | | | | | | | | | | | | | 2 |
| 29 | (Czech Republic) Ondřej Ježek | Yamaha | 15 | Ret | Ret | DSQ | DSQ | DSQ | DSQ | DSQ | 18 | 15 | 18 | 17 | 17 | 18 | | | | | | | | | | | | | 2 |
| 30 | (Italy) Alessandro Andreozzi | Yamaha | | | | | | | | | | | | | | | | | 15 | Ret | | | | | | | | | 1 |
| | (United States) Josh Herrin | Yamaha | | | | | | | | | | | | | | | Ret | 16 | | | | | | | | | | | 0 |
| | (France) Jérémy Guarnoni | Kawasaki | | | | | | | | | | | | | | | | | | | | | 17 | 19 | | | | | 0 |
| | (Russia) Vladimir Leonov | Kawasaki | | | | | DNS | 17 | | | Ret | Ret | | | | | | | | | | | | | | | | | 0 |
| | (United Kingdom) Gino Rea | Suzuki | | | | | | | | | | | 23 | 19 | | | | | | | | | | | | | | | 0 |
| | (Australia) Daniel Falzon | Yamaha | Ret | DSQ | | | | | | | | | | | | | | | | | | | | | | | | | 0 |
| | (Czech Republic) Jakub Smrž | Yamaha | | | | | | | | | | | | | | | | | | | Ret | Ret | Ret | Ret | Ret | Ret | DNS | C | 0 |
| | (France) Matthieu Lussiana | Aprilia | | | | | | | | | | | | | | | | | | | | | Ret | Ret | | | | | 0 |
| | (United Kingdom) Mason Law | Kawasaki | | | | | | | | | | | Ret | Ret | | | | | | | | | | | | | | | 0 |
| | (Australia) Jason O'Halloran | Honda | | | | | | | | | Ret | DNS | | | | | | | | | | | | | | | | | 0 |
| | (Australia) Troy Herfoss | Honda | Ret | DNS | | | | | | | | | | | | | | | | | | | | | | | | | 0 |
| | (Australia) Wayne Maxwell | Yamaha | Ret | DNS | | | | | | | | | | | | | | | | | | | | | | | | | 0 |
| Pos. | Rider | Bike | PHI (Australia) | | CHA (Thailand) | | ARA (Spain) | | ASS (Netherlands) | | IMO (Italy) | | DON (United Kingdom) | | BRN (Czech Republic) | | LAG (United States) | | MIS (Italy) | | POR (Portugal) | | MAG (France) | | VIL (Argentina) | | LOS (Qatar) | | Pts |

| Colour | Result |
|---|---|
| Gold | Winner |
| Silver | Second place |
| Bronze | Third place |
| Green | Points classification |
| Blue | Non-points classification |
| Blue | Non-classified finish (NC) |
| Purple | Retired, not classified (Ret) |
| Red | Did not qualify (DNQ) |
| Red | Did not pre-qualify (DNPQ) |
| Black | Disqualified (DSQ) |
| White | Did not start (DNS) |
| White | Withdrew (WD) |
| White | Race cancelled (C) |
| Blank | Did not practice (DNP) |
| Blank | Did not arrive (DNA) |
| Blank | Excluded (EX) |

**Bold** – Pole position
Italics – Fastest lap

=== Teams' championship ===
| Pos. | Team | Bike No. | PHI (Australia) | | CHA (Thailand) | | ARA (Spain) | | ASS (Netherlands) | | IMO (Italy) | | DON (United Kingdom) | | BRN (Czech Republic) | | LAG (United States) | | MIS (Italy) | | POR (Portugal) | | MAG (France) | | VIL (Argentina) | | LOS (Qatar) | | Pts. |
| Pos. | Team | Bike No. | R1 | R2 | R1 | R2 | R1 | R2 | R1 | R2 | R1 | R2 | R1 | R2 | R1 | R2 | R1 | R2 | R1 | R2 | R1 | R2 | R1 | R2 | R1 | R2 | R1 | R2 | Pts. |
|---|---|---|---|---|---|---|---|---|---|---|---|---|---|---|---|---|---|---|---|---|---|---|---|---|---|---|---|---|---|
| 1 | (Japan) Kawasaki Racing Team WorldSBK | 1 | 5 | 2 | **1** | 4 | 1 | 2 | 1 | 2 | **1** | 1 | 2 | 3 | 1 | Ret | 1 | 1 | 1 | 1 | 1 | 1 | 1 | 1 | 1 | 1 | 1 | C | 859 |
| 1 | (Japan) Kawasaki Racing Team WorldSBK | 66 | **2** | 4 | 6 | Ret | 6 | 6 | 4 | 1 | 2 | 3 | **3** | 6 | **3** | 16 | 7 | 8 | **5** | 5 | 5 | 5 | **2** | 4 | 6 | 5 | **2** | C | 859 |
| 2 | (Italy) Aruba.it Racing – Ducati | 7 | 3 | Ret | 3 | 1 | 2 | 1 | 3 | 5 | 4 | 2 | 8 | 5 | 8 | 3 | **2** | 2 | 2 | 4 | 4 | 4 | 5 | 2 | Ret | 4 | 8 | C | 653 |
| 2 | (Italy) Aruba.it Racing – Ducati | 33 | 1 | 1 | 8 | 7 | **4** | 3 | 6 | 7 | 3 | Ret | 22 | 11 | 2 | 15 | 5 | Ret | 7 | 3 | 2 | 3 | 6 | 5 | **2** | 3 | 5 | C | 653 |
| 3 | (Japan) Pata Yamaha Official WorldSBK Team | 60 | 9 | 7 | 7 | 2 | 5 | 5 | 2 | 3 | 6 | Ret | 1 | 1 | 4 | 2 | 8 | 5 | 4 | 2 | 3 | 2 | 7 | 3 | 8 | 9 | 7 | C | 581 |
| 3 | (Japan) Pata Yamaha Official WorldSBK Team | 22 | 6 | 5 | 5 | 3 | 7 | 4 | **12** | 14 | 10 | 6 | 4 | 4 | 5 | 1 | 3 | 4 | Ret | 6 | 10 | 11 | 18 | 7 | 7 | 6 | 3 | C | 581 |
| 4 | (United Kingdom) Milwaukee Aprilia | 50 | 8 | 15 | 9 | Ret | | | | | 12 | 9 | 6 | Ret | 6 | 4 | 4 | 3 | 3 | 8 | **Ret** | 7 | 9 | 11 | 5 | Ret | 4 | C | 307 |
| 4 | (United Kingdom) Milwaukee Aprilia | 32 | DNS | DNS | 12 | 9 | 15 | 10 | 15 | 10 | 8 | Ret | 5 | 7 | 7 | 5 | 14 | Ret | 8 | 7 | Ret | 6 | 4 | 6 | Ret | 8 | 11 | C | 307 |
| 4 | (United Kingdom) Milwaukee Aprilia | 34 | | | | | 13 | 18 | 13 | 11 | | | | | | | | | | | | | | | | | | | 307 |
| 5 | (Italy) Barni Racing Team | 12 | 4 | 3 | 2 | 5 | 3 | Ret | 5 | 4 | 5 | 4 | Ret | Ret | 14 | 8 | 6 | 6 | 6 | Ret | Ret | 10 | 3 | 8 | 4 | 2 | 13 | C | 230 |
| 6 | (Netherlands) Red Bull Honda World Superbike Team | 2 | 7 | 6 | 4 | 6 | Ret | DNS | | | WD | WD | 10 | 8 | 9 | 7 | Ret | 13 | 9 | 10 | Ret | 14 | 11 | 9 | 10 | Ret | Ret | C | 172 |
| 6 | (Netherlands) Red Bull Honda World Superbike Team | 45 | 12 | 13 | 18 | 14 | 12 | 12 | DNS | DNS | 16 | Ret | 16 | 13 | Ret | 12 | 10 | 9 | 14 | 14 | 13 | 12 | 13 | 16 | Ret | 10 | 9 | C | 172 |
| 6 | (Netherlands) Red Bull Honda World Superbike Team | 20 | | | | | | | | | Ret | DNS | | | | | | | | | | | | | | | | | 172 |
| 7 | (Italy) Kawasaki Puccetti Racing | 54 | 13 | 10 | 15 | 8 | 9 | 9 | 10 | 9 | 11 | 8 | 21 | 2 | 10 | 9 | Ret | DNS | 11 | 12 | 8 | Ret | 8 | 12 | 3 | 7 | 10 | C | 165 |
| 7 | (Italy) Kawasaki Puccetti Racing | 91 | | | | | | | | | 9 | 16 | 9 | Ret | | | | | | | | | | | | | | | 165 |
| 8 | (Italy) Gulf Althea BMW Racing Team | 76 | 11 | 9 | 11 | 12 | 11 | 15 | 7 | 8 | 13 | 11 | 7 | 10 | 18 | 11 | 15 | 10 | Ret | 9 | 6 | 9 | 10 | 10 | 9 | 11 | 6 | C | 137 |
| 9 | (Italy) MV Agusta Reparto Corse | 81 | Ret | 8 | 10 | Ret | Ret | 8 | 9 | 6 | 14 | 5 | 11 | 9 | Ret | Ret | 9 | 7 | 18 | Ret | 7 | 13 | 12 | 14 | | | | | 101 |
| 9 | (Italy) MV Agusta Reparto Corse | 77 | | | | | | | | | | | | | | | | | | | | | | | 13 | Ret | Ret | C | 101 |
| 10 | (Italy) Aruba.it Racing – Junior Team | 21 | | | | | 8 | 7 | Ret | 12 | 7 | 7 | 12 | Ret | 15 | 6 | | | 17 | 11 | 9 | 8 | Ret | 13 | | | | | 77 |
| 11 | (Spain) Orelac Racing VerdNatura | 36 | 10 | 12 | 13 | Ret | Ret | 13 | 8 | Ret | 15 | 10 | 13 | 12 | 12 | 17 | Ret | 11 | 10 | 17 | 11 | 15 | 14 | 15 | Ret | 12 | 12 | C | 70 |
| 12 | (Italy) Team GoEleven Kawasaki | 40 | 14 | 11 | 14 | 13 | 10 | 11 | 11 | Ret | Ret | 12 | 19 | Ret | 13 | 10 | 12 | 12 | 13 | 15 | 14 | Ret | 15 | 18 | 12 | 13 | 14 | C | 65 |
| 13 | (Italy) Team Pedercini Racing | 68 | Ret | DNS | 16 | 11 | 14 | 16 | 16 | 15 | 17 | 13 | | | 11 | 14 | 11 | 15 | Ret | 16 | 12 | 16 | | | | | | | 35 |
| 13 | (Italy) Team Pedercini Racing | 16 | | | | | | | | | | | | | | | | | | | | | | | 14 | 14 | 15 | C | 35 |
| 13 | (Italy) Team Pedercini Racing | 41 | | | | | | | | | | | 17 | 14 | | | | | | | | | | | | | | | 35 |
| 13 | (Italy) Team Pedercini Racing | 11 | | | | | | | | | | | | | | | | | | | | | 17 | 19 | | | | | 35 |
| 14 | (Germany) Triple M Honda World Superbike Team | 99 | 16 | 14 | 17 | 10 | 16 | 14 | 14 | 13 | Ret | 14 | 15 | 16 | 16 | 13 | Ret | Ret | 16 | Ret | Ret | 17 | 16 | 17 | | | | | 26 |
| 14 | (Germany) Triple M Honda World Superbike Team | 51 | | | | | | | | | | | | | | | | | | | | | | | 11 | Ret | | | 26 |
| 15 | (Italy) Guandalini Racing | 98 | | | | | | | | | | | | | | | 13 | 14 | | | | | | | | | | | 8 |
| 15 | (Italy) Guandalini Racing | 37 | 15 | Ret | Ret | DSQ | DSQ | DSQ | DSQ | DSQ | 18 | 15 | 18 | 17 | 17 | 18 | | | | | | | | | | | | | 8 |
| 15 | (Italy) Guandalini Racing | 24 | | | | | | | | | | | | | | | | | 15 | Ret | | | | | | | | | 8 |
| 15 | (Italy) Guandalini Racing | 96 | | | | | | | | | | | | | | | | | | | Ret | Ret | Ret | Ret | Ret | Ret | DNS | C | 8 |
| 16 | (Italy) Yamaha Motor Europe | 94 | | | | | | | | | | | 20 | 18 | | | | | 12 | 13 | | | | | | | | | 7 |
| 17 | (United Kingdom) Buildbase Suzuki | 28 | | | | | | | | | | | 14 | 15 | | | | | | | | | | | | | | | 3 |
| | (United States) Attack 2Wheel Legal Yamaha | 57 | | | | | | | | | | | | | | | Ret | 16 | | | | | | | | | | | 0 |
| | (Russia) SPB Racing Team | 5 | | | | | DNS | 17 | | | Ret | Ret | | | | | | | | | | | | | | | | | 0 |
| | (United Kingdom) OMG Racing UK | 44 | | | | | | | | | | | 23 | 19 | | | | | | | | | | | | | | | 0 |
| | (Australia) Yamaha Racing Team | 25 | Ret | DSQ | | | | | | | | | | | | | | | | | | | | | | | | | 0 |
| | (Australia) Yamaha Racing Team | 47 | Ret | DNS | | | | | | | | | | | | | | | | | | | | | | | | | 0 |
| | (Australia) Penrite Honda | 17 | Ret | DNS | | | | | | | | | | | | | | | | | | | | | | | | | 0 |
| | (United Kingdom) Team WD40 | 55 | | | | | | | | | | | Ret | Ret | | | | | | | | | | | | | | | 0 |
| | (France) Dreamteamcompany | 121 | | | | | | | | | | | | | | | | | | | | | Ret | Ret | | | | | 0 |
| Pos. | Team | Bike No. | PHI (Australia) | | CHA (Thailand) | | ARA (Spain) | | ASS (Netherlands) | | IMO (Italy) | | DON (United Kingdom) | | BRN (Czech Republic) | | LAG (United States) | | MIS (Italy) | | POR (Portugal) | | MAG (France) | | VIL (Argentina) | | LOS (Qatar) | | Pts. |

=== Manufacturers' championship ===
| Pos. | Manufacturer | PHI (Australia) | | CHA (Thailand) | | ARA (Spain) | | ASS (Netherlands) | | IMO (Italy) | | DON (United Kingdom) | | BRN (Czech Republic) | | LAG (United States) | | MIS (Italy) | | POR (Portugal) | | MAG (France) | | VIL (Argentina) | | LOS (Qatar) | | Pts |
| Pos. | Manufacturer | R1 | R2 | R1 | R2 | R1 | R2 | R1 | R2 | R1 | R2 | R1 | R2 | R1 | R2 | R1 | R2 | R1 | R2 | R1 | R2 | R1 | R2 | R1 | R2 | R1 | R2 | Pts |
|---|---|---|---|---|---|---|---|---|---|---|---|---|---|---|---|---|---|---|---|---|---|---|---|---|---|---|---|---|
| 1 | (Japan) Kawasaki | 2 | 2 | 1 | 4 | 1 | 2 | 1 | 1 | 1 | 1 | 2 | 2 | 1 | 9 | 1 | 1 | 1 | 1 | 1 | 1 | 1 | 1 | 1 | 1 | 1 | C | 570 |
| 2 | (Italy) Ducati | 1 | 1 | 2 | 1 | 2 | 1 | 3 | 4 | 3 | 2 | 8 | 5 | 2 | 3 | 2 | 2 | 2 | 3 | 2 | 3 | 3 | 2 | 2 | 2 | 5 | C | 459 |
| 3 | (Japan) Yamaha | 6 | 5 | 5 | 2 | 5 | 4 | 2 | 3 | 6 | 6 | 1 | 1 | 4 | 1 | 3 | 4 | 4 | 2 | 3 | 2 | 7 | 3 | 7 | 6 | 3 | C | 378 |
| 4 | (Italy) Aprilia | 8 | 15 | 9 | 9 | 13 | 10 | 13 | 10 | 8 | 9 | 5 | 7 | 6 | 4 | 4 | 3 | 3 | 7 | Ret | 6 | 4 | 6 | 5 | 8 | 4 | C | 218 |
| 5 | (Japan) Honda | 7 | 6 | 4 | 6 | 12 | 12 | 14 | 13 | 16 | 14 | 10 | 8 | 9 | 7 | 10 | 9 | 9 | 10 | 13 | 12 | 11 | 9 | 10 | 10 | 9 | C | 151 |
| 6 | (Germany) BMW | 11 | 9 | 11 | 12 | 11 | 15 | 7 | 8 | 13 | 11 | 7 | 10 | 18 | 11 | 15 | 10 | Ret | 9 | 6 | 9 | 10 | 10 | 9 | 11 | 6 | C | 137 |
| 7 | (Italy) MV Agusta | Ret | 8 | 10 | Ret | Ret | 8 | 9 | 6 | 14 | 5 | 11 | 9 | Ret | Ret | 9 | 7 | 18 | Ret | 7 | 13 | 12 | 14 | 13 | Ret | Ret | C | 101 |
| 8 | (Japan) Suzuki | | | | | | | | | | | 14 | 15 | | | | | | | | | | | | | | | 3 |
| Pos. | Manufacturer | PHI (Australia) | | CHA (Thailand) | | ARA (Spain) | | ASS (Netherlands) | | IMO (Italy) | | DON (United Kingdom) | | BRN (Czech Republic) | | LAG (United States) | | MIS (Italy) | | POR (Portugal) | | MAG (France) | | VIL (Argentina) | | LOS (Qatar) | | Pts |
