= Jonathan Rea =

Northern Irish motorcycle racer

Jonathan Rea OBE
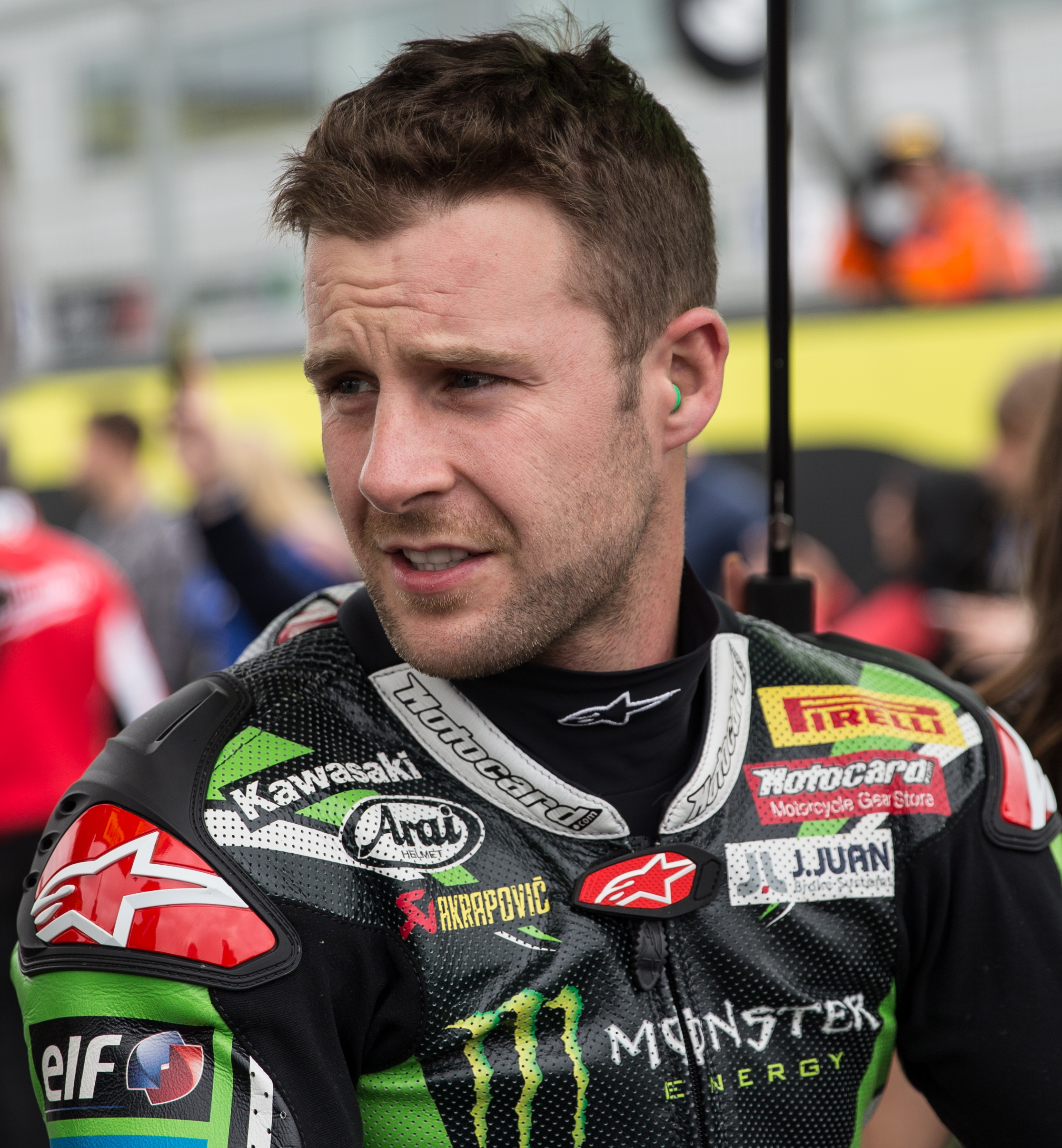
- Rea at Donington Park in 2016
- Nationality: Northern Irish
- Born: 2 February 1987 (age 39); Larne, Northern Ireland, United Kingdom
- Current team: Honda HRC
- Bike number: 65
- Website: jonathan-rea.com
Motorcycle racing career statistics
MotoGP World Championship
Active years	2012
Manufacturers	Honda
Championships	0
2012 championship position	21st (17 pts)
Starts / Wins / Podiums / Poles / F. laps / Points; 2 / 0 / 0 / 0 / 0 / 17
Superbike World Championship
Active years	2008–2026
Manufacturers	Honda (2008–2014, 2026); Kawasaki (2015–2023); Yamaha (2024–2025)
Championships	6 (2015, 2016, 2017, 2018, 2019, 2020)
2026 championship position	24th (6 pts)
Starts / Wins / Podiums / Poles / F. laps / Points; 476 / 119 / 263 / 44 / 104 / 6388.5
Supersport World Championship
Active years	2008
Manufacturers	Honda
Championships	0
2008 championship position	2nd (164 pts)
Starts / Wins / Podiums / Poles / F. laps / Points; 12 / 3 / 6 / 0 / 0 / 164

Jonathan Rea (born 2 February 1987) is a Northern Irish motorcycle racer and six-time Superbike World Champion. He competed full-time in the Superbike World Championship from 2009 to 2025, winning consecutive titles from 2015 to 2020 and amassing a record 119 race wins. Rea announced his retirement from full-time racing in August 2025 and will return to Honda in 2026 as a test rider, also competing in selected Endurance World Championship events.

Previously, Rea was runner-up in the Supersport World Championship for Ten Kate Honda in 2008, and runner-up in the British Superbike Championship in 2007 for HM Plant Honda. He was named Irish Motorcyclist of the Year in 2007, 2008, 2011 and 2016. Rea made two MotoGP starts in 2012, scoring points on both occasions, but was not a regular rider in the championship.

== Career ==
=== Early career ===
For much of his career, Rea has been backed by Red Bull. Rea was British 60cc motocross runner up in 1997, before moving up through the motocross classes. He was not originally keen to switch to circuit racing as he considered it to be boring, but he was persuaded to by friends Michael and Eugene Laverty, contesting the 2003 British 125cc Championship. His 2004 season was interrupted by a crash at Knockhill.

In 2005, Red Bull set up a British Superbike ride for him on a factory-spec Honda Fireblade. He showed his potential by snatching a pole position from the established names, and finished 16th in the series despite missing two races, at Snetterton after a heavy testing crash, and at Oulton Park after the death of a junior teammate in the previous event.

=== British Superbike Championship ===
Rea started the 2006 season strongly, lying sixth in the British Superbike Championship after five meetings. At Oulton Park, he finished third in race two, before being demoted to fourth as he was deemed to have gained a place from Shane Byrne on the last lap illegally, although he claimed that he crossed the infield grass as he was squeezed out of road. He qualified fifth at Mondello Park before heavy rain forced the cancellation of the races, and claimed that he had been on race tyres, rather than special soft qualifying compounds. He impressed at Mallory Park too, qualifying on the front row and running second until high-siding in race one, despite having no race engineer for the weekend. At Knockhill, he took pole position, and followed a fourth in race one with his first career podium in race two, passing Leon Haslam for second with two laps to go. He ultimately took fourth in the championship, ahead of the factory Honda of Karl Harris.

Rea took Harris' factory ride for 2007, alongside reigning champion Ryuichi Kiyonari of Japan. After four-second places, he finally took his first win in the second race at Mondello Park, after dominating wet practice but struggling in the dry first race. A double victory at Knockhill followed, taking him to within nine points of Kiyonari at the top of the standings – retaining this position after Oulton Park in which each HM Plant Honda rider won once and crashed once. He ultimately finished as the series runner-up, 26 points behind Kiyonari and 20 ahead of Leon Haslam.

Also in 2007, Rea raced with Kiyonari and won a three-hour endurance race, and the pair was then entered for the Suzuka 8-Hour race on a factory Honda machine. Plans for him to contest the British MotoGP round on a Team Roberts bike were scrapped in favour of extra Suzuka preparation. He attended the 2007 World Superbike round at Brands Hatch, as he began to explore international options.

=== Supersport World Championship ===
In September 2007, Rea signed a three-year progressive deal with Ten Kate Honda to ride in the Supersport World Championship for the 2008 season, and the Superbike World Championship for the 2009 and 2010 seasons. He turned down the option of staying in British Superbikes with either HM Plant Honda or move to Rizla Suzuki, and turned down a World Superbike ride with the factory Xerox Ducati team. In his first race at Losail in Qatar, he crashed, badly injuring a finger. At Assen, he challenged for a first WSS win, losing by 0.014 seconds to teammate Andrew Pitt. He did win for Ten Kate at the Donington Park British Supersport race, which the team entered as practice for the later WSS race there. His first World Supersport win came at Brno, and he immediately followed this with a second win at Brands Hatch, although the race was stopped early after the fatal accident of Craig Jones with seven laps remaining in the race. A third win followed at Vallelunga, pushing him back up to second in the standings behind Pitt. His chances of winning the title were ended by a wild move from Robbin Harms in the penultimate round at Magny-Cours. He did remount to finish tenth in the race.

=== Superbike World Championship ===
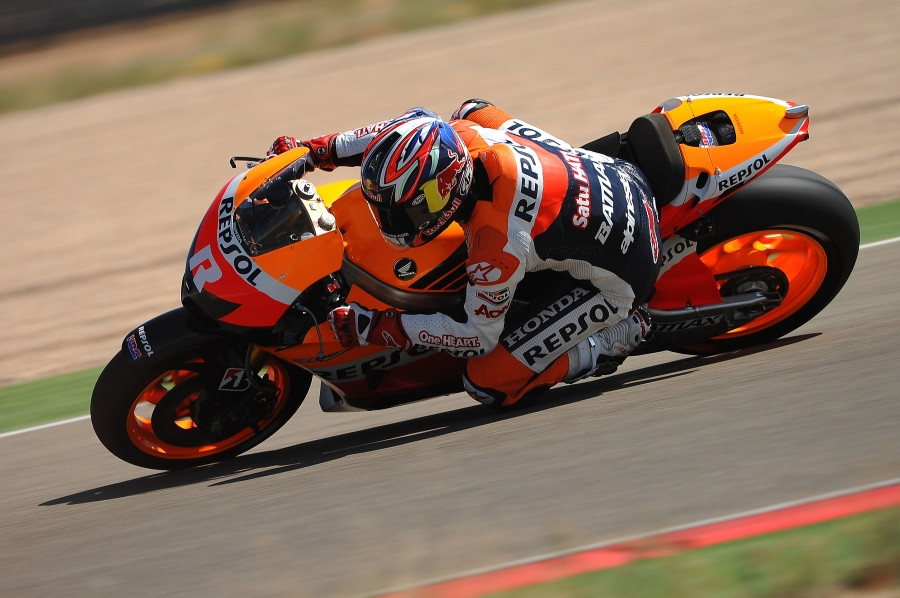
Jonathan Rea at Test MotoGP Aragón 2012

For 2009, Rea rode for the Hannspree Ten Kate Honda team in World Superbikes. He made the switch before the end of 2008, meaning that he made his WSBK debut in the final 2008 round at Portimão. His first podium came in the second race at round six at Kyalami. Another third place followed in the very next round at Miller Motorsport Park, before his first WSBK win came at Misano, after a frantic battle with the Ducati duo of Noriyuki Haga and Michel Fabrizio. This followed a chaotic first race that day; his bike failed on the dummy grid, he received a ride-through penalty for being given a lift back to the pits by Kiyonari on the warm-up lap, and when he switched to a wet set-up bike he – like teammate Carlos Checa – had trouble getting the second bike fired up. Rea missed several rounds in 2011 after sustained arm and collarbone injuries in a high-speed accident during warm-up for the Misano event. Rea missed the final four races of 2013 due to a broken femur.

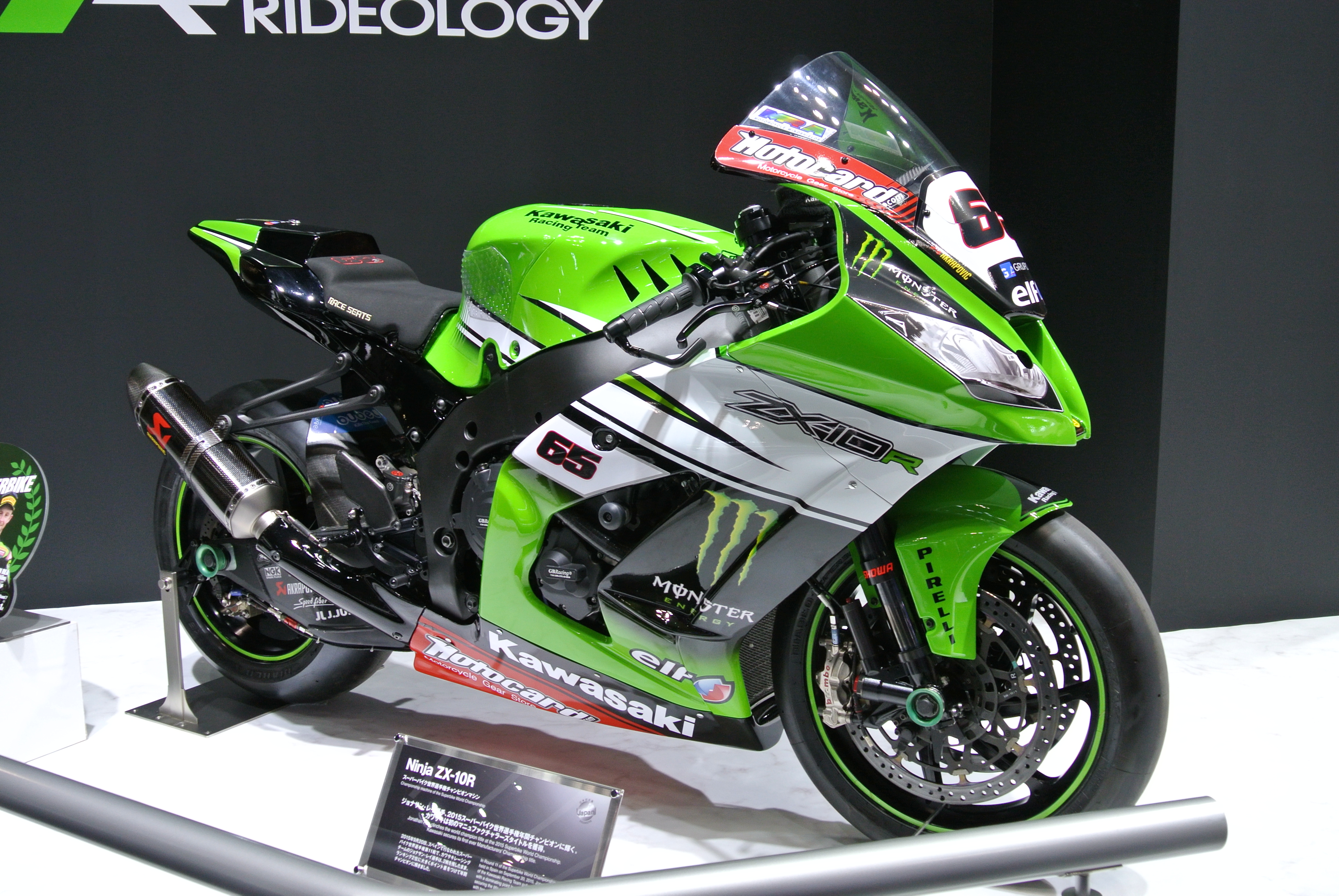
Rea's championship-winning ZX-10R on display in Tokyo

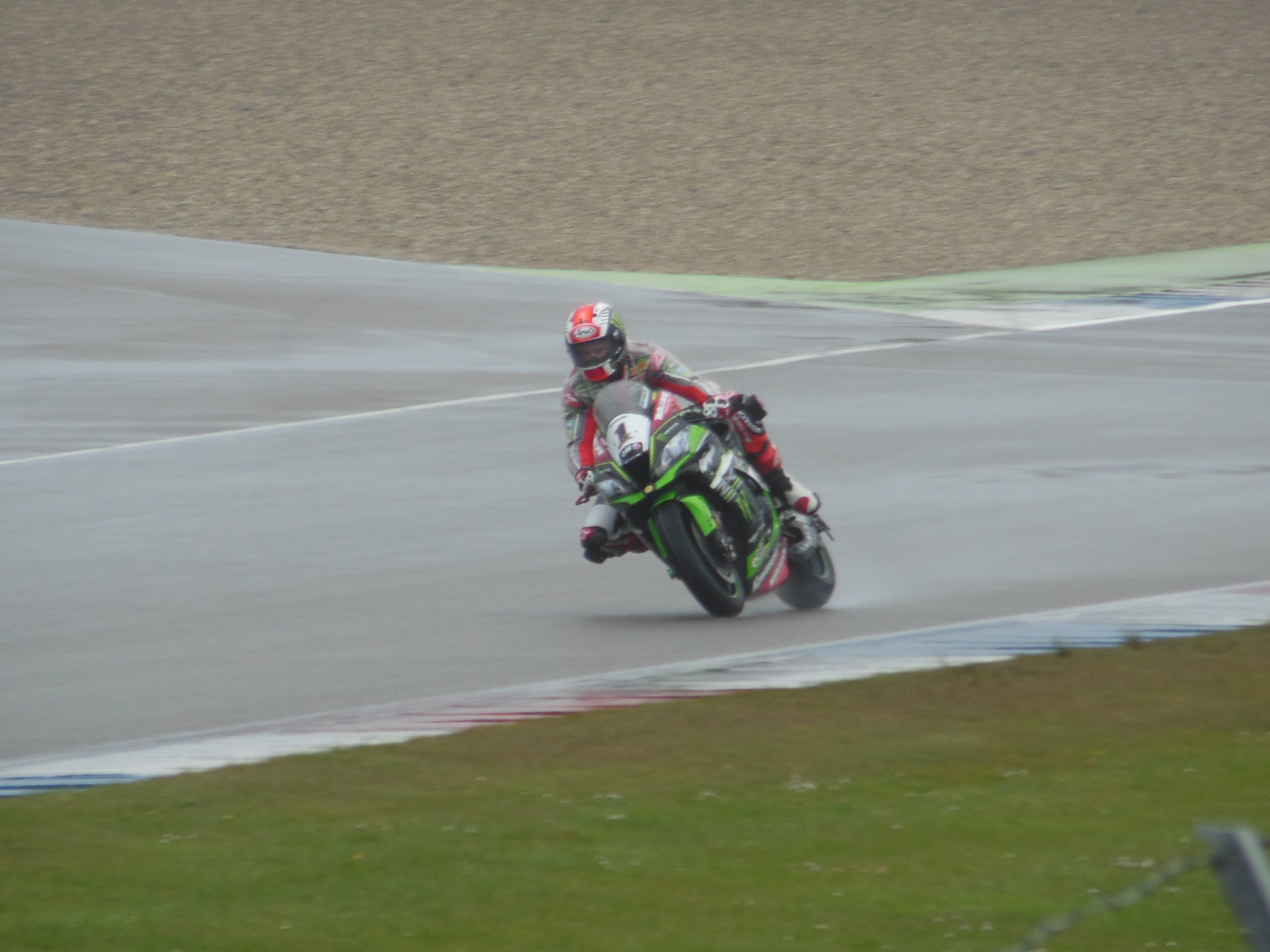
Rea at Assen in 2016

Rea added a further win in Germany to finish fifth overall and second best rookie behind top rookie, Ben Spies, who won the World Superbike championship that year. He remained with Ten Kate for 2010, and scored a double victory at the team's home round at Assen, however this was followed by two crashes at Monza. A further crash in Superpole at Miller Motorsport Park injured his neck and shoulder, though he still raced the next day, scoring a 14th and an eighth. He scored only seven points at Misano, as he fell behind Carlos Checa in the battle for third place in the championship standings.

For the 2011 season, Rea stayed with the Ten Kate Racing family as its Honda-supported World Superbike team received backing from global lubricants manufacturer, Castrol, reviving the famous Castrol Honda name that saw World Superbike championship victories with John Kocinski in 1997 and Colin Edwards in 2000 and 2002.

After spending his entire career riding Honda machinery, Rea joined Kawasaki Racing Team as Tom Sykes' new teammate for the 2015 season. Rea dominated the season and won his maiden World Superbike title, with 14 wins.

Rea remained with Kawasaki in World Superbike championship until 2024. He retained the title in 2016, 2017, 2018, 2019 and 2020 championship, becoming the first man ever to win six successive superbike world championships. On 9 June 2018, Rea won the first race at Brno to take his 60th career win and surpass the record of Carl Fogarty.

=== MotoGP World Championship ===
Rea made his MotoGP debut in 2012, replacing the injured Casey Stoner for the Repsol Honda team. He finished eighth in the San Marino race, held at Misano in Italy, and seventh at Motorland Aragon in Spain, before returning to World Superbike duties.

=== Retirement and return to Honda ===
In August 2025, Rea announced his retirement from full-time racing. His final season was with Yamaha, although a knee injury ruled him out of his last race that October.

In 2026, Rea would return to Honda as a test rider and would also compete in selected Endurance World Championship events. He described the move as a "full-circle moment".

== Personal life ==
Rea's family background lies in motorcycle road racing. His father, Johnny, competed at the Isle of Man TT and took his sole victory during the 1989 Junior TT race. His grandfather, John, sponsored Joey Dunlop.

Rea married Tatiana Weston, an Australian known as 'Tarsh' (whom he met when she worked promoting UK-based superbike team Honda Racing) at a 2012 ceremony in the Lake District.

Rea was appointed Member of the Order of the British Empire (MBE) in the 2017 Birthday Honours, for services to motorcycle racing.

Rea was nominated for the 2017 BBC Sports Personality of the Year Award, finishing in second place.

Queen's University Belfast conferred an honorary doctorate on Rea during December 2019.

In 2021, Rea obtained his UK motorcycle licence for solo road machines by undertaking a course in his native Northern Ireland having passed with no minors and having the driving instructor pass him a laurel and bottle of champagne for his achievements.

Rea was appointed Officer of the Order of the British Empire (OBE) in the 2022 New Year Honours, also for services to motorcycle racing.

== Career statistics ==
=== All-time statistics ===
Series	Years	Races	Poles	Podiums	Wins	2nd place	3rd place	Fastest laps	Titles	Points
British Superbike Championship	2005–2007	72	7	20	5	11	4	5	0	719
Supersport World Championship	2008	12	0	6	3	1	2	0	0	164
Superbike World Championship	2008–2025	476	44	264	119	86	58	104	6	6388.5
MotoGP World Championship	2012	2	0	0	0	0	0	0	0	17
Total		562	51	289	127	98	64	109	6	7288.5

=== British Superbike Championship ===
==== Races by year ====
(key) (Races in bold indicate pole position; races in italics indicate fastest lap)

Year	Bike	1		2		3		4		5		6		7		8		9		10		11		12		13		Pos	Pts
Year	Bike	R1	R2	R1	R2	R1	R2	R1	R2	R1	R2	R1	R2	R1	R2	R1	R2	R1	R2	R1	R2	R1	R2	R1	R2	R1	R2	Pos	Pts
2005	Honda	BHI; 13	BHI; 18	THR; 16	THR; 12	MAL; 14	MAL; 14	OUL; 12	OUL; 9	**MOP**; Ret	**MOP**; Ret	CRO; 7	CRO; Ret	KNO; Ret	KNO; 9	SNE	SNE	SIL; 12	SIL; 11	CAD; Ret	CAD; Ret	OUL	OUL	DON; Ret	DON; 11	BHGP; 10	BHGP; 10	16th	64
2006	Honda	BHI; 5	BHI; Ret	DON; 8	DON; 5	THR; 4	THR; 5	OUL; 8	OUL; 4	MOP; C	MOP; C	MAL; Ret	MAL; 8	SNE; 4	SNE; 20	**KNO**; 4	**KNO**; 2	OUL; 5	OUL; 4	**CRO**; 2	**CRO**; 13	CAD; Ret	CAD; 3	SIL; 4	SIL; 5	BHGP; 18	BHGP; 3	4th	248
2007	Honda	**BHGP**; 3	**BHGP**; 2	THR; Ret	THR; 4	SIL; 2	SIL; 3	OUL; 4	OUL; 5	SNE; 2	SNE; 2	**MOP**; 4	**MOP**; 1	**KNO**; 1	**KNO**; 1	**OUL**; Ret	**OUL**; 1	MAL; 2	MAL; Ret	CRO; 2	CRO; 2	CAD; Ret	CAD; 1	DON; 5	DON; 7	BHI; 2	BHI; 2	2nd	407

=== Supersport World Championship ===
==== Races by year ====
(key) (Races in bold indicate pole position; races in italics indicate fastest lap)

Year	Bike	1	2	3	4	5	6	7	8	9	10	11	12	13	Pos	Pts
2008	Honda	QAT; Ret	AUS; 5	ESP; 6	NED; 2	ITA; Ret	GER; 6	SMR; 3	CZE; 1	GBR; 1	EUR; 3	ITA; 1	FRA; 10	POR	2nd	164

=== Superbike World Championship ===
==== By season ====
Season	Motorcycle	Team	Race	Win	Podium	Pole	FLap	Pts	Plcd
2008	Honda CBR1000RR	Hannspree Ten Kate Honda	2	0	0	0	0	14	26th
2009	Honda CBR1000RR	HANNspree Ten Kate Honda	28	2	8	0	2	315	5th
2010	Honda CBR1000RR	HANNspree Ten Kate Honda	23	4	10	1	5	292	4th
2011	Honda CBR1000RR	Castrol Honda	18	2	5	2	0	170	9th
2012	Honda CBR1000RR	Honda World Superbike Team	27	2	6	0	0	278.5	5th
2013	Honda CBR1000RR	Pata Honda World Superbike	18	1	4	0	1	176	9th
2014	Honda CBR1000RR	Pata Honda World Superbike	24	4	9	1	2	334	**3rd**
2015	Kawasaki Ninja ZX-10R	Kawasaki Racing Team	26	14	23	2	11	548	**1st**
2016	Kawasaki Ninja ZX-10R	Kawasaki Racing Team	26	9	23	2	6	498	**1st**
2017	Kawasaki Ninja ZX-10RR	Kawasaki Racing Team	26	16	24	6	14	556	**1st**
2018	Kawasaki Ninja ZX-10RR	Kawasaki Racing Team WorldSBK	25	17	22	2	14	545	**1st**
2019	Kawasaki Ninja ZX-10RR	Kawasaki Racing Team WorldSBK	37	17	34	7	12	663	**1st**
2020	Kawasaki Ninja ZX-10RR	Kawasaki Racing Team WorldSBK	24	11	17	4	11	360	**1st**
2021	Kawasaki Ninja ZX-10RR	Kawasaki Racing Team WorldSBK	37	13	30	8	14	551	**2nd**
2022	Kawasaki Ninja ZX-10RR	Kawasaki Racing Team WorldSBK	36	6	30	5	8	502	**3rd**
2023	Kawasaki Ninja ZX-10RR	Kawasaki Racing Team WorldSBK	36	1	18	3	4	370	**3rd**
2024	Yamaha YZF-R1	Pata Yamaha Prometeon WorldSBK	31	0	1	1	0	127	13th
2025	Yamaha YZF-R1	Pata Yamaha Prometeon WorldSBK	26	0	0	0	0	83	16th
2026	Honda CBR1000RR	Honda HRC	6	0	0	0	0	6	24th
Total			**476**	**119**	**264**	**44**	**104**	**6388.5**	

==== Races by year ====
(key) (Races in bold indicate pole position; races in italics indicate fastest lap)

Year	Bike	1		2		3		4		5		6		7		8		9		10		11		12		13		14		Pos	Pts
Year	Bike	R1	R2	R1	R2	R1	R2	R1	R2	R1	R2	R1	R2	R1	R2	R1	R2	R1	R2	R1	R2	R1	R2	R1	R2	R1	R2	R1	R2	Pos	Pts
2008	Honda	QAT	QAT	AUS	AUS	SPA	SPA	NED	NED	ITA	ITA	USA	USA	GER	GER	SMR	SMR	CZE	CZE	GBR	GBR	EUR	EUR	ITA	ITA	FRA	FRA	POR; 4	POR; 15	26th	14
2009	Honda	AUS; 5	AUS; 9	QAT; 12	QAT; 8	SPA; Ret	SPA; 13	NED; 7	NED; 5	ITA; 5	ITA; 4	RSA; 4	RSA; 3	USA; 5	USA; 3	SMR; 7	SMR; 1	GBR; 7	GBR; 15	CZE; 3	CZE; 4	GER; 4	GER; 1	ITA; 7	ITA; 6	FRA; Ret	FRA; 3	POR; 2	POR; 3	5th	315
2010	Honda	AUS; 4	AUS; 6	POR; 3	POR; Ret	SPA; 6	SPA; 5	**NED**; 1	**NED**; 1	ITA; Ret	ITA; Ret	RSA; 5	RSA; 2	USA; 14	USA; 8	SMR; 13	SMR; 12	CZE; 1	CZE; 2	GBR; 2	GBR; 2	GER; 1	GER; 2	ITA; DNS	ITA; DNS	FRA; 12	FRA; DNS			4th	292
2011	Honda	AUS; 12	AUS; 4	EUR; 5	EUR; 6	NED; 1	NED; 3	ITA; 6	ITA; Ret	USA; Ret	USA; 11	SMR; DNS	SMR; DNS	SPA	SPA	CZE	CZE	GBR	GBR	GER; 10	GER; 4	ITA; 1	ITA; Ret	**FRA**; Ret	**FRA**; Ret	**POR**; 3	**POR**; 3			9th	170
2012	Honda	AUS; 7	AUS; 4	ITA; 9	ITA; 5	NED; Ret	NED; 1	ITA; C	ITA; 6	EUR; 4	EUR; 1	USA; 4	USA; 2	SMR; 5	SMR; 2	SPA; 16	SPA; 5	CZE; Ret	CZE; 12	GBR; 4	GBR; 9	RUS; Ret	RUS; 7	GER; Ret	GER; 4	POR; 6	POR; 2	FRA; 13	FRA; 2	5th	278.5
2013	Honda	AUS; 8	AUS; 8	SPA; 4	SPA; 15	NED; 2	NED; 4	ITA; 8	ITA; Ret	GBR; 4	GBR; 11	POR; Ret	POR; 3	ITA; Ret	ITA; 2	RUS; 4	RUS; C	GBR; 1	GBR; 4	GER; Ret	GER; DNS	TUR	TUR	USA	USA	FRA	FRA	SPA	SPA	9th	176
2014	Honda	AUS; 6	AUS; 5	SPA; 3	SPA; 5	NED; 3	NED; 1	**ITA**; 1	**ITA**; 1	GBR; 6	GBR; 6	MAL; 6	MAL; 6	SMR; 7	SMR; 5	POR; 5	POR; 1	USA; 6	USA; 3	SPA; 4	SPA; 5	FRA; 3	FRA; Ret	QAT; 4	QAT; 2					3rd	334
2015	Kawasaki	**AUS**; 1	**AUS**; 2	**THA**; 1	**THA**; 1	SPA; 1	SPA; 2	NED; 1	NED; 1	ITA; 1	ITA; 1	GBR; 2	GBR; 2	POR; 1	POR; 1	SMR; 2	SMR; 1	USA; 3	USA; 3	MAL; 1	MAL; 2	SPA; 4	SPA; 4	FRA; 1	FRA; 1	QAT; 2	QAT; Ret			1st	548
2016	Kawasaki	AUS; 1	AUS; 1	THA; 1	THA; 2	SPA; 2	SPA; 3	NED; 1	NED; 1	ITA; 2	ITA; 2	MAL; 2	MAL; 3	GBR; 3	GBR; 2	ITA; 1	ITA; 1	USA; 1	USA; Ret	GER; Ret	GER; 1	**FRA**; 4	**FRA**; 2	SPA; 3	SPA; 2	**QAT**; 2	**QAT**; 3			1st	498
2017	Kawasaki	**AUS**; 1	AUS; 1	**THA**; 1	THA; 1	ARA; 1	ARA; 2	**NED**; 1	NED; 1	ITA; 2	ITA; 2	GBR; Ret	GBR; 1	ITA; 3	ITA; 2	USA; 2	USA; 1	GER; 2	GER; 2	**POR**; 1	POR; 1	**FRA**; 1	FRA; Ret	SPA; 1	SPA; 1	**QAT**; 1	QAT; 1			1st	556
2018	Kawasaki	AUS; 5	AUS; 2	**THA**; 1	THA; 4	ARA; 1	ARA; 2	NED; 1	NED; 2	**ITA**; 1	ITA; 1	GBR; 2	GBR; 3	CZE; 1	CZE; Ret	USA; 1	USA; 1	ITA; 1	ITA; 1	POR; 1	POR; 1	FRA; 1	FRA; 1	ARG; 1	ARG; 1	QAT; 1	QAT; C			1st	545

Year	Bike	1			2			3			4			5			6			7			8			9			10			11			12			13			Pos	Pts
Year	Bike	R1	SR	R2	R1	SR	R2	R1	SR	R2	R1	SR	R2	R1	SR	R2	R1	SR	R2	R1	SR	R2	R1	SR	R2	R1	SR	R2	R1	SR	R2	R1	SR	R2	R1	SR	R2	R1	SR	R2	Pos	Pts
2019	Kawasaki	**AUS**; 2	**AUS**; 2	AUS; 2	THA; 2	THA; 2	THA; 2	SPA; 2	SPA; 2	SPA; 2	NED; 2	NED; C	NED; 3	ITA; 1	ITA; 1	ITA; C	**SPA**; 4	**SPA**; 4	SPA; 2	**ITA**; 1	**ITA**; 5	ITA; 1	GBR; 1	GBR; 1	GBR; 1	**USA**; 1	**USA**; 1	USA; 2	**POR**; 1	**POR**; 1	POR; 2	**FRA**; 2	**FRA**; 2	FRA; 1	ARG; 2	ARG; 1	ARG; 1	**QAT**; 1	**QAT**; 1	QAT; 1	1st	663
2020	Kawasaki	AUS; Ret	AUS; 1	AUS; 2	SPA; 2	SPA; 1	SPA; 6	**POR**; 1	**POR**; 1	POR; 1	**SPA**; 3	**SPA**; 1	SPA; 1	**SPA**; 2	**SPA**; 2	SPA; 1	**SPA**; 1	**SPA**; 2	SPA; 4	FRA; 1	FRA; 1	FRA; 4	POR; 4	POR; 5	POR; 14																1st	360
2021	Kawasaki	**SPA**; 1	**SPA**; 1	SPA; 2	**POR**; 3	**POR**; 1	POR; 1	**ITA**; 3	**ITA**; 3	ITA; 3	**GBR**; 2	**GBR**; 1	GBR; 20	**NED**; 1	**NED**; 1	NED; 1	**CZE**; Ret	**CZE**; 3	CZE; 3	**SPA**; 2	**SPA**; 2	SPA; 3	**FRA**; 2	**FRA**; 1	FRA; 2	SPA; 4	SPA; 1	SPA; 6	SPA; 2	SPA; C	SPA; 5	POR; Ret	POR; Ret	POR; 1	ARG; 2	ARG; 3	ARG; 2	INA; 1	INA; C	INA; 1	2nd	551
2022	Kawasaki	SPA; 1	SPA; 2	SPA; 2	NED; 1	NED; 1	NED; Ret	**POR**; 3	**POR**; 1	POR; 1	ITA; 2	ITA; 3	ITA; 4	**GBR**; 2	**GBR**; 2	GBR; 3	**CZE**; 4	**CZE**; 2	CZE; 3	**FRA**; 24	**FRA**; 3	FRA; 5	SPA; 2	SPA; 2	SPA; 4	**POR**; 3	**POR**; 3	POR; 3	ARG; 2	ARG; 3	ARG; 3	INA; 3	INA; 2	INA; 3	AUS; 1	AUS; 3	AUS; 2				3rd	502
2023	Kawasaki	AUS; 2	AUS; 7	AUS; 8	INA; 9	INA; 4	INA; Ret	NED; 2	NED; 2	NED; Ret	SPA; 3	SPA; Ret	SPA; 5	ITA; 5	ITA; 5	ITA; 4	**GBR**; 3	**GBR**; 3	GBR; 5	ITA; 3	ITA; 4	ITA; 3	CZE; 1	CZE; 2	CZE; 3	FRA; 3	FRA; 3	FRA; 3	**SPA**; 3	**SPA**; 2	SPA; 4	**POR**; 3	**POR**; Ret	POR; 10	SPA; 4	SPA; 3	SPA; 17				3rd	370
2024	Yamaha	AUS; 17	AUS; 10	AUS; Ret	SPA; Ret	SPA; 12	SPA; 8	**NED**; 6	**NED**; 5	NED; 19	ITA; Ret	ITA; 8	ITA; 10	GBR; 5	GBR; 3	GBR; 8	CZE; 10	CZE; 8	CZE; 6	POR; 15	POR; 10	POR; 6	FRA; Ret	FRA; DNS	FRA; DNS	ITA	ITA	ITA	SPA; 14	SPA; 12	SPA; 13	POR; 5	POR; 22	POR; 4	SPA; 11	SPA; 11	SPA; 9				13th	127
2025	Yamaha	AUS	AUS	AUS	POR	POR	POR	NED	NED	NED	ITA; 19	ITA; 16	ITA; 18	CZE; 10	CZE; 10	CZE; 13	EMI; 12	EMI; 7	EMI; Ret	GBR; 5	GBR; 6	GBR; 15	HUN; Ret	HUN; 9	HUN; 12	FRA; Ret	FRA; 7	FRA; 6	ARA; 13	ARA; 8	ARA; 5	POR; 6	POR; Ret	POR; 9	SPA; Ret	SPA; Ret	SPA; DNS				16th	83
2026	Honda	AUS	AUS	AUS	POR; 19	POR; 18	POR; 12	NED; 17	NED; 17	NED; 19	HUN	HUN	HUN	CZE	CZE	CZE	ARA	ARA	ARA	EMI	EMI	EMI	GBR	GBR	GBR	FRA	FRA	FRA	ITA	ITA	ITA	POR	POR	POR	SPA	SPA	SPA				24th	6

=== Grand Prix motorcycle racing ===
==== By season ====
Season	Class	Motorcycle	Team	Race	Win	Podium	Pole	FLap	Pts	Plcd
2012	MotoGP	Honda	Repsol Honda Team	2	0	0	0	0	17	21st
Total				**2**	**0**	**0**	**0**	**0**	**17**	

==== By class ====
Class	Seasons	1st GP	1st pod	1st win	Race	Win	Podiums	Pole	FLap	Pts	WChmp
MotoGP	2012	2012 San Marino			2	0	0	0	0	17	0
Total	2012				**2**	**0**	**0**	**0**	**0**	**17**	**0**

==== Races by year ====
(key) (Races in bold indicate pole position; races in italics indicate fastest lap)

Year	Class	Bike	1	2	3	4	5	6	7	8	9	10	11	12	13	14	15	16	17	18	Pos	Pts
2012	MotoGP	Honda	QAT	SPA	POR	FRA	CAT	GBR	NED	GER	ITA	USA	IND	CZE	RSM; 8	ARA; 7	JPN	MAL	AUS	VAL	21st	17

=== Suzuka 8 Hours ===
Year	Team	Co-riders	Bike	Pos
2012	(Japan) F.C.C. TSR	(Japan) Kousuke Akiyoshi (Japan) Tadayuki Okada	Honda CBR1000RRW	1st
2018	(Japan) Team Green Kawasaki	(United Kingdom) Leon Haslam (Japan) Kazuma Watanabe	Kawasaki ZX-10RR	3rd
2019	(Japan) Kawasaki Racing Team Suzuka 8H	(United Kingdom) Leon Haslam (Turkey) Toprak Razgatlıoğlu	Kawasaki ZX-10RR	1st
2022	(Japan) Kawasaki Racing Team Suzuka 8H	(United Kingdom) Leon Haslam (United Kingdom) Alex Lowes	Kawasaki ZX-10RR	2nd
2026	(Japan) Team HRC	(Japan) Takumi Takahashi (Thailand) Somkiat Chantra	Honda CBR1000RR-R SP	1st

== Bibliography ==
- Rea, Jonathan (2 May 2019). Dream. Believe. Achieve. My Autobiography. HarperCollins. ISBN 978-0008305109.
