= Shaun Muir Racing =

Motorcycle race team

BMW Motorrad WorldSBK Team
- 2026 name: ROKiT BMW Motorrad WorldSBK
- Base: Guisborough, Cleveland, England
- Team principal/s: Shaun Muir; Sven Blusch (BMW)
- Race riders: 9 Danilo Petrucci (2026); 88 Miguel Oliveira (2026)
- Test rider/s: Sylvain Guintoli; Markus Reiterberger
- Motorcycle: BMW M1000RR
- Tyres: Pirelli
- Riders' Championships: Superbike World Championship; Toprak Razgatlıoğlu (2024, 2025); British Superbike Championship; Tommy Hill (2011); Josh Brookes (2015)

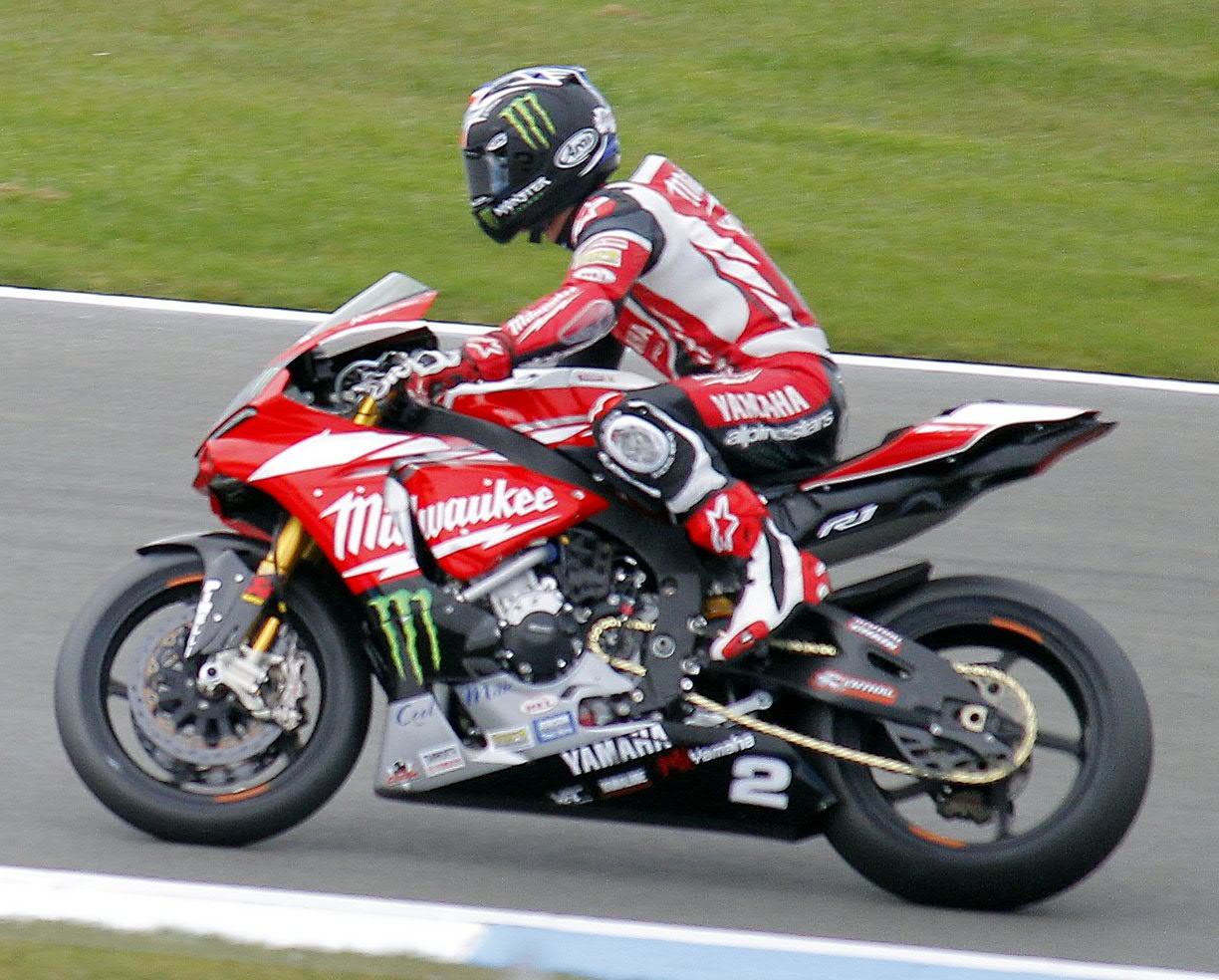
Broc Parkes on a Milwaukee Yamaha R1 Superbike in early 2015

Shaun Muir Racing (or SMR) is an international race team based in Guisborough, Cleveland in the north-east of England. The team is owned by Shaun Muir, a former international superbike racer. In 2019, they became the BMW works team using BMW S1000RR machines, culminating in winning the 2024 Superbike World Championship with rider Toprak Razgatlıoğlu and M1000 RR machines.

They were the 2011 British Superbike Championship winning team with rider Tommy Hill, and again in 2015 with rider Josh Brookes.

Shaun Muir Racing began in 2002, moving into the British Superbike Championship in 2004 under the Hydrex Honda banner, staying with Honda until 2011 when they switched to Yamaha machinery going on to win their first title. Their first major sponsorship were Hydrex, a company that specialises in the rental and sale of mobile plant equipment with the rail, industrial and construction industries, up until the end of the 2009 season. The team was sponsored by tobacco accessories brand Swan, starting in 2010 and lasting until the end of 2012. From 2013 to 2015, the team used the name Milwaukee Yamaha, reflecting the name of its major sponsor, Milwaukee Tools.

During 2015, SMR acted as a Yamaha factory development agent, working to develop the cross-plane R1 engined machines in advance of an anticipated return to World Superbike racing in 2016.

In an online interview in November 2015, rider Josh Brookes commented that Muir could not make a statement regarding the team's plans for 2016 until the contract with Yamaha had ended in December. In early December, Shaun Muir confirmed his move to BMW M1000RR machinery and World Superbikes.

== World Superbikes 2016 season ==
Logo used for 2016

For 2016, Shaun Muir Racing confirmed a new arrangement with BMW Motorrad Motorsport to participate in World Superbikes, initially via a one-year contract with a second-year option, as a semi-factory supported team, again backed by key-sponsor Milwaukee Tools for three years. Muir further confirmed his disappointment that Yamaha had not responded as expected with an offer of machinery for 2016 World Superbikes as far back as June/July 2015, and that he anticipated better interaction with the BMW factory. The 2015 BSB champion rider Josh Brookes will be retained, joined by Czech rider Karel Abraham.

== British Superbikes 2015 season ==
Logo used for 2015

During 2015, SMR acted as a Yamaha factory development agent in conjunction with Yamaha Europe and their German research and development base, using the British Superbike season to progress the machines in advance of an anticipated return to World Superbike racing in 2016. The alliance provided the team with the latest engine improvements, with manager Mick Shanley making regular trips to the base of engine tuner Marcus Eschenbacher.

For 2015, the team logo was uniquely changed from the previous version, by adding the official Yamaha crossed tuning-fork logo, together with the additional legend "Official Team BSB".

== British Superbikes 2013–2014 season ==
Logo used for 2013 and 2014

During the 2013 and 2014 seasons, SMR worked with major sponsor Milwaukee Tools and race-modified Yamaha R1 machines purchased over-the-counter. The team logo for 2013 and 2014 was historically significant, using the name Milwaukee Yamaha Racing, until changes were made for the 2015 season by adding the official Yamaha tuning-fork logo with added legend unique for 2015, changing the appearance to Milwaukee Yamaha Racing, Official Team BSB.

== Riders present and past ==
=== As BMW Motorrad ===
Rider	Number	Season	Notes
(United Kingdom) Tom Sykes	66	2019	
(Germany) Markus Reiterberger	21	2019	
(United Kingdom) Tom Sykes	66	2020	
(Republic of Ireland) Eugene Laverty	58	2020	
(United Kingdom) Tom Sykes	66	2021	
(Republic of Ireland) Eugene Laverty	58	2021	Rounds 10–12, replacement for Sykes
(Netherlands) Michael van der Mark	60	2021	
(United Kingdom) Scott Redding	45	2022	
(Netherlands) Michael van der Mark	60	2022	
(Ukraine) Ilya Mykhalchyk	37	2022	Rounds 1 and 4–5, replacement for van der Mark
(United Kingdom) Peter Hickman	10	2022	Round 6, replacement for van der Mark
(United Kingdom) Scott Redding	45	2023	
(Netherlands) Michael van der Mark	60	2023	
(Portugal) Ivo Lopes	75	2023	Round 4, replacement for van der Mark
(United Kingdom) Tom Sykes	66	2023	Rounds 5–6, replacement for van der Mark
(United Kingdom) Leon Haslam	91	2023	Round 7, replacement for van der Mark
(Turkey) Toprak Razgatlıoğlu	54	2024	
(Netherlands) Michael van der Mark	60	2024	
(Germany) Markus Reiterberger	21	2024	Round 9, replacement for Razgatlıoğlu
(Turkey) Toprak Razgatlıoğlu	1	2025	
(Netherlands) Michael van der Mark	60	2025	
(Italy) Danilo Petrucci	9	2026	
(Portugal) Miguel Oliveira	88	2026	

=== As Shaun Muir Racing ===
Rider	Team	Number	Championship	Era	Notes
(England) Kieran Clarke	Hydrex Honda	74	British Superbikes	2005	All rounds
(England) Steve Plater	Hydrex Honda	4	British Superbikes	2005	Rounds 8–13
(England) Gary Mason	Hydrex Honda	5	British Superbikes	2006	Rounds 1–12
(Australia) Glen Richards	Hydrex Honda	75	British Superbikes	2006	All rounds
(Australia) Dean Thomas	Hydrex Honda	12	British Superbikes	2006	Round 13, replacement for Mason
(England) Guy Martin	Hydrex Honda	9	British Superbikes	2007	Rounds 1–3, 8, 11
(England) Leon Camier	Hydrex Honda	2	British Superbikes	2007	Rounds 1–11
(England) Ian Hutchinson	Hydrex Honda	2	British Superbikes	2007	Rounds 12–13, replacement for Camier
(England) Guy Martin	Hydrex Honda	15	British Superbikes	2008	Rounds 1–3, 5–12
(England) James Ellison	Hydrex Honda	7	British Superbikes	2008	Rounds 1–8, 10–12
(England) Stuart Easton	Hydrex Honda	3	British Superbikes	2009	All rounds
(England) Karl Harris	Hydrex Honda	5	British Superbikes	2009	Rounds 1–9
(England) Tommy Hill	Hydrex Honda	33	British Superbikes	2009	Rounds 10–12, replacement for Harris
(England) James Ellison	Swan Honda	2	British Superbikes	2010	Rounds 1–2, 5–12
(England) Stuart Easton	Swan Honda	3	British Superbikes	2010	All rounds
(Northern Ireland) Michael Laverty	Swan Yamaha	7	British Superbikes	2011	All rounds
(England) Tommy Hill	Swan Yamaha	33	British Superbikes	2011	All rounds
(England) Tommy Hill	Swan Yamaha	1	British Superbikes	2012	All rounds
(Japan) Noriyuki Haga	Swan Yamaha	41	British Superbikes	2012	All rounds
(England) James Ellison	Milwaukee Yamaha	77	British Superbikes	2013	All rounds
(Australia) Josh Waters	Milwaukee Yamaha	21	British Superbikes	2013	Rounds 1–9
(England) Tommy Bridewell	Milwaukee Yamaha	46	British Superbikes	2013	Rounds 10–12, replacement for Waters
(England) Tommy Bridewell	Milwaukee Yamaha	46	British Superbikes	2014	All rounds
(England) Ian Hutchinson	Milwaukee Yamaha	2	British Superbikes	2014	Rounds 1–7
(Sweden) Filip Backlund	Milwaukee Yamaha	8	British Superbikes	2014	Rounds 9–12, replacement for Hutchinson
(Australia) Josh Brookes	Milwaukee Yamaha	3	British Superbikes	2014	All rounds
(Australia) Josh Brookes	Milwaukee Yamaha	25	British Superbikes	2015	All rounds
(Australia) Broc Parkes	Milwaukee Yamaha	2	British Superbikes	2015	Rounds 1–7
(Czech Republic) Jakub Smrž	Milwaukee Yamaha	96	British Superbikes	2015	Rounds 10–12, replacement for Parkes
(Australia) Josh Brookes	Milwaukee BMW	25	World Superbikes	2016	All rounds
(Czech Republic) Karel Abraham	Milwaukee BMW	17	World Superbikes	2016	Rounds 1–11, 13
(Republic of Ireland) Eugene Laverty	Milwaukee Aprilia	58	World Superbikes	2017	All races
(Spain) Julián Simón	Milwaukee Aprilia	60	World Superbikes	2017	Round 3, replacement for Savadori
(Italy) Lorenzo Savadori	Milwaukee Aprilia	32	World Superbikes	2017	Rounds 1–2, 4–13
(Republic of Ireland) Eugene Laverty	Milwaukee Aprilia	58	World Superbikes	2018	Rounds 1–2, 5–13
(Italy) Lorenzo Savadori	Milwaukee Aprilia	32	World Superbikes	2018	All rounds
(Italy) Davide Giugliano	Milwaukee Aprilia	34	World Superbikes	2018	Rounds 3–4, replacement for Laverty

== Road Racing ==
Guy Martin, William Dunlop and Conor Cummins have represented the team on the roads at North West 200, Isle of Man TT, Macau Grand Prix, Kells and Isle of Man Southern 100 on the Superbike, Supersport and Superstock machines.

== British Superbike Championship ==
After the departure of James Ellison in 2008 to GSE Racing Airwaves Yamaha Team, Karl Harris was taken on to race alongside Stuart Easton to compete for the BSB championship in 2009.

Easton finished third place in the Championship, whilst Harris was dropped due to poor performances, his place being taken for the last three rounds by Tommy Hill.

== Superbike World Championship ==
=== Results ===
(key) (Races in bold indicate pole position; races in italics indicate fastest lap)

Year	Team	Bike	Tyres	No.	Riders	1		2		3		4		5		6		7		8		9		10		11		12		13		RC	Points	TC	Points	MC	Points
Year	Team	Bike	Tyres	No.	Riders	R1	R2	R1	R2	R1	R2	R1	R2	R1	R2	R1	R2	R1	R2	R1	R2	R1	R2	R1	R2	R1	R2	R1	R2	R1	R2	RC	Points	TC	Points	MC	Points
2016	Milwaukee BMW	BMW S1000RR	P			AUS	AUS	THA	THA	SPA	SPA	NED	NED	ITA	ITA	MAL	MAL	GBR	GBR	ITA	ITA	USA	USA	GER	GER	FRA	FRA	SPA	SPA	QAT	QAT						
2016	Milwaukee BMW	BMW S1000RR	P	17	(Czech Republic) Karel Abraham	13	11	Ret	15	15	14	Ret	14	16	Ret	12	Ret	9	Ret	Ret	15	14	12	Ret	15	16	16			Ret	Ret	18th	33	9th	122	4th	234
2016	Milwaukee BMW	BMW S1000RR	P	25	(Australia) Josh Brookes	10	9	15	16	13	13	11	Ret	14	13	11	12	14	9	11	14	13	Ret	14	7	12	11	10	12	15	Ret	14th	89	9th	122	4th	234
2017	Milwaukee Aprilia	Aprilia RSV4 RF	P			AUS	AUS	THA	THA	SPA	SPA	NED	NED	ITA	ITA	GBR	GBR	ITA	ITA	USA	USA	GER	GER	POR	POR	FRA	FRA	SPA	SPA	QAT	QAT						
2017	Milwaukee Aprilia	Aprilia RSV4 RF	P	3	(Spain) Julián Simón					13	15																					34th	4	4th	285	4th	213
2017	Milwaukee Aprilia	Aprilia RSV4 RF	P	32	(Italy) Lorenzo Savadori	Ret	9	13	Ret			5	Ret	12	13	12	Ret	9	6	10	8	7	7	8	6	11	Ret	7	18	5	Ret	11th	124	4th	285	4th	213
2017	Milwaukee Aprilia	Aprilia RSV4 RF	P	50	(Republic of Ireland) Eugene Laverty	8	10	Ret	15	8	9	8	8	NC	7	13	Ret	6	5	Ret	6	10	Ret	7	4	6	17	8	Ret	4	7	10th	157	4th	285	4th	213
2018	Milwaukee Aprilia	Aprilia RSV4 RF	P			AUS	AUS	THA	THA	SPA	SPA	NED	NED	ITA	ITA	GBR	GBR	CZE	CZE	USA	USA	ITA	ITA	POR	POR	FRA	FRA	ARG	ARG	QAT	QAT						
2018	Milwaukee Aprilia	Aprilia RSV4 RF	P	32	(Italy) Lorenzo Savadori	DNS	DNS	12	9	15	10	15	10	8	Ret	5	7	7	5	14	Ret	8	7	Ret	6	4	6	Ret	8	11	C	10th	138	4th	307	4th	218
2018	Milwaukee Aprilia	Aprilia RSV4 RF	P	34	(Italy) Davide Giugliano					13	18	13	11																			21st	11	4th	307	4th	218
2018	Milwaukee Aprilia	Aprilia RSV4 RF	P	50	(Republic of Ireland) Eugene Laverty	8	15	9	Ret					12	9	6	Ret	6	4	4	3	3	8	**Ret**	7	9	11	5	Ret	4	C	8th	158	4th	307	4th	218

Year	Team	Bike	Tyres	No.	Riders	1			2			3			4			5			6			7			8			9			10			11			12			13			RC	Points	TC	Points	MC	Points
Year	Team	Bike	Tyres	No.	Riders	R1	SR	R2	R1	SR	R2	R1	SR	R2	R1	SR	R2	R1	SR	R2	R1	SR	R2	R1	SR	R2	R1	SR	R2	R1	SR	R2	R1	SR	R2	R1	SR	R2	R1	SR	R2	R1	SR	R2	RC	Points	TC	Points	MC	Points
2019	BMW Motorrad WorldSBK Team	BMW S1000RR	P			AUS	AUS	AUS	THA	THA	THA	SPA	SPA	SPA	NED	NED	NED	ITA	ITA	ITA	SPA	SPA	SPA	ITA	ITA	ITA	GBR	GBR	GBR	USA	USA	USA	POR	POR	POR	FRA	FRA	FRA	ARG	ARG	ARG	QAT	QAT	QAT						
2019	BMW Motorrad WorldSBK Team	BMW S1000RR	P	10	(United Kingdom) Peter Hickman																						7	Ret	11																21st	14	4th	320	4th	249
2019	BMW Motorrad WorldSBK Team	BMW S1000RR	P	28	(Germany) Markus Reiterberger	13	12	12	14	14	11	Ret	Ret	15	6	C	6	10	10	C	11	15	12	15	13	11				15	12	13	12	14	13	16	17	15	11	17	16	8	15	14	14th	83	4th	320	4th	249
2019	BMW Motorrad WorldSBK Team	BMW S1000RR	P	66	(United Kingdom) Tom Sykes	7	11	13	9	10	Ret	5	5	12	10	C	7	Ret	8	C	6	5	7	2	Ret	6	**2**	**Ret**	7	4	3	5	13	7	9	3	8	8	7	9	Ret	Ret	12	12	8th	223	4th	320	4th	249
2020	BMW Motorrad WorldSBK Team	BMW S1000RR	P			AUS	AUS	AUS	SPA	SPA	SPA	POR	POR	POR	SPA	SPA	SPA	SPA	SPA	SPA	SPA	SPA	SPA	FRA	FRA	FRA	POR	POR	POR																					
2020	BMW Motorrad WorldSBK Team	BMW S1000RR	P	50	(Republic of Ireland) Eugene Laverty	11	DNS	DNS	15	13	Ret	10	20	12	16	16	14	8	14	11	11	11	7	**Ret**	**15**	14	12	16	12																15th	55	7th	143	5th	101
2020	BMW Motorrad WorldSBK Team	BMW S1000RR	P	66	(United Kingdom) Tom Sykes	**9**	**6**	10	NC	6	11	8	6	7	Ret	15	12	10	9	Ret	Ret	9	5	Ret	20	10	10	11	10																12th	88	7th	143	5th	101
2021	BMW Motorrad WorldSBK Team	BMW M1000RR	P			SPA	SPA	SPA	POR	POR	POR	ITA	ITA	ITA	GBR	GBR	GBR	NED	NED	NED	CZE	CZE	CZE	SPA	SPA	SPA	FRA	FRA	FRA	SPA	SPA	SPA	SPA	SPA	SPA	POR	POR	POR	ARG	ARG	ARG	INA	INA	INA						
2021	BMW Motorrad WorldSBK Team	BMW M1000RR	P	50	(Republic of Ireland) Eugene Laverty																												12	C	11	9	9	10	13	15	16				19th	26 (40)	4th	472	4th	315
2021	BMW Motorrad WorldSBK Team	BMW M1000RR	P	60	(Netherlands) Michael van der Mark	11	5	5	7	13	6	10	Ret	10	5	3	5	4	Ret	6	Ret	11	7	7	8	9	5	6	8	5	Ret	9	7	C	8	Ret	1	6	6	5	6	6	C	3	6th	262	4th	472	4th	315
2021	BMW Motorrad WorldSBK Team	BMW M1000RR	P	66	(United Kingdom) Tom Sykes	6	Ret	4	14	7	8	8	7	12	4	2	3	7	7	15	9	5	9	6	6	5	9	12	10	**8**	**Ret**	Ret										10	C	5	11th	184	4th	472	4th	315
2022	BMW Motorrad WorldSBK Team	BMW M1000RR	P			SPA	SPA	SPA	NED	NED	NED	POR	POR	POR	ITA	ITA	ITA	GBR	GBR	GBR	CZE	CZE	CZE	FRA	FRA	FRA	SPA	SPA	SPA	POR	POR	POR	ARG	ARG	ARG	INA	INA	INA	AUS	AUS	AUS									
2022	BMW Motorrad WorldSBK Team	BMW M1000RR	P	10	(United Kingdom) Peter Hickman													22	16	19	22	19	14																						30th	2	5th	262	4th	259
2022	BMW Motorrad WorldSBK Team	BMW M1000RR	P	37	(Ukraine) Illia Mykhalchyk										18	15	15																												22nd	10	5th	262	4th	259
2022	BMW Motorrad WorldSBK Team	BMW M1000RR	P	45	(United Kingdom) Scott Redding	15	12	Ret	9	11	5	8	7	11	10	11	9	4	3	5	3	8	4	2	5	6	Ret	8	Ret	18	13	7	7	14	9	12	6	6	16	6	6				8th	204	5th	262	4th	259
2022	BMW Motorrad WorldSBK Team	BMW M1000RR	P	60	(Netherlands) Michael van der Mark				13	10	8	WD	WD	WD										12	13	Ret	Ret	Ret	13	14	8	12	10	11	10	Ret	10	12	Ret	21	12				15th	46	5th	262	4th	259
2023	ROKiT BMW Motorrad WorldSBK Team	BMW M1000RR	P			AUS	AUS	AUS	INA	INA	INA	NED	NED	NED	SPA	SPA	SPA	EMI	EMI	EMI	GBR	GBR	GBR	ITA	ITA	ITA	CZE	CZE	CZE	FRA	FRA	FRA	SPA	SPA	SPA	POR	POR	POR	SPA	SPA	SPA									
2023	ROKiT BMW Motorrad WorldSBK Team	BMW M1000RR	P	45	(United Kingdom) Scott Redding	9	14	13	Ret	9	10	10	8	7	Ret	12	Ret	11	11	14	8	9	4	10	9	8	4	11	8	7	20	Ret	11	11	14	15	13	14	Ret	Ret	8				14th	126	9th	193	4th	224
2023	ROKiT BMW Motorrad WorldSBK Team	BMW M1000RR	P	60	(Netherlands) Michael van der Mark	8	11	9	6	8	Ret	13	10	Ret													13	14	15	16	13	Ret	13	13	11	7	7	11	Ret	8	12				17th	54	9th	193	4th	224
2023	ROKiT BMW Motorrad WorldSBK Team	BMW M1000RR	P	66	(United Kingdom) Tom Sykes													16	20	13	9	18	Ret																						20th	11	9th	193	4th	224
2023	ROKiT BMW Motorrad WorldSBK Team	BMW M1000RR	P	70	(Portugal) Ivo Miguel Lopes										15	15	17																												27th	1	9th	193	4th	224
2023	ROKiT BMW Motorrad WorldSBK Team	BMW M1000RR	P	91	(United Kingdom) Leon Haslam																			14	15	Ret																			23rd	2	9th	193	4th	224
2024	ROKiT BMW Motorrad WorldSBK Team	BMW M1000RR	P			AUS	AUS	AUS	SPA	SPA	SPA	NED	NED	NED	ITA	ITA	ITA	GBR	GBR	GBR	CZE	CZE	CZE	POR	POR	POR	FRA	FRA	FRA	ITA	ITA	ITA	SPA	SPA	SPA	POR	POR	POR	SPA	SPA	SPA									
2024	ROKiT BMW Motorrad WorldSBK Team	BMW M1000RR	P	37	(Germany) Markus Reiterberger																									14	16	15													26th	3	2nd	747	2nd	606
2024	ROKiT BMW Motorrad WorldSBK Team	BMW M1000RR	P	54	(Turkey) Toprak Razgatlıoğlu	5	3	Ret	**1**	**1**	3	2	9	1	**1**	**1**	1	**1**	**1**	1	**1**	**1**	1	**1**	**1**	1	WD	WD	WD				2	2	2	**1**	**2**	1	2	2	1				1st	527	2nd	747	2nd	606
2024	ROKiT BMW Motorrad WorldSBK Team	BMW M1000RR	P	60	(Netherlands) Michael van der Mark	7	16	8	9	6	4	7	8	9	8	12	Ret	9	12	12	9	9	5	6	4	7	1	8	5	7	12	7	9	8	7	7	12	5	6	6	3				6th	245	2nd	747	2nd	606
2025	ROKiT BMW Motorrad WorldSBK Team	BMW M1000RR	P			AUS	AUS	AUS	POR	POR	POR	NED	NED	NED	ITA	ITA	ITA	CZE	CZE	CZE	EMI	EMI	EMI	GBR	GBR	GBR	HUN	HUN	HUN	FRA	FRA	FRA	SPA	SPA	SPA	POR	POR	POR	SPA	SPA	SPA									
2025	ROKiT BMW Motorrad WorldSBK Team	BMW M1000RR	P	1	(Turkey) Toprak Razgatlıoğlu	2	13	Ret	**1**	**1**	1	4	1	8	2	2	2	**1**	**1**	2	1	1	1	**1**	**1**	1	**1**	**1**	1	**1**	**1**	1	1	2	2	**1**	**1**	2	2	Ret	3				1st	616	2nd	727	2nd	619
2025	ROKiT BMW Motorrad WorldSBK Team	BMW M1000RR	P	60	(Netherlands) Michael van der Mark	Ret	14	14	6	7	5	9	5	17	8	9	9	Ret	13	14	Ret	12	10	13	Ret	Ret	11	15	16	Ret	5	5	10	9	Ret	15	9	10	10	9	13				12th	111	2nd	727	2nd	619
2026	ROKiT BMW Motorrad WorldSBK Team	BMW M1000RR	P			AUS	AUS	AUS	POR	POR	POR	NED	NED	NED	HUN	HUN	HUN	CZE	CZE	CZE	ARA	ARA	ARA	EMI	EMI	EMI	GBR	GBR	GBR	FRA	FRA	FRA	ITA	ITA	ITA	POR	POR	POR	SPA	SPA	SPA									
2026	ROKiT BMW Motorrad WorldSBK Team	BMW M1000RR	P	9	(Italy) Danilo Petrucci	10	10	6	10	12	7	18	7	9	11	16	DNS	Ret	WD	WD							15	19	15	13	16	12	14	11	12	18	16	16	17	19	20				17th	61	7th	226	3rd	184
2026	ROKiT BMW Motorrad WorldSBK Team	BMW M1000RR	P	60	(Netherlands) Michael van der Mark													14	10	13	11	11	10	Ret	11	9																			20th	23	7th	226	3rd	184
2026	ROKiT BMW Motorrad WorldSBK Team	BMW M1000RR	P	88	(Portugal) Miguel Oliveira	8	18	7	3	3	3	7	11	12	3	Ret	DNS							8	6	Ret	11	20	12	Ret	12	15	Ret	8	Ret	4	4	8	Ret	11	10				11th	142	7th	226	3rd	184

* Season still in progress.
