= 2027 MotoGP World Championship =

79th running of the MotoGP World Championship

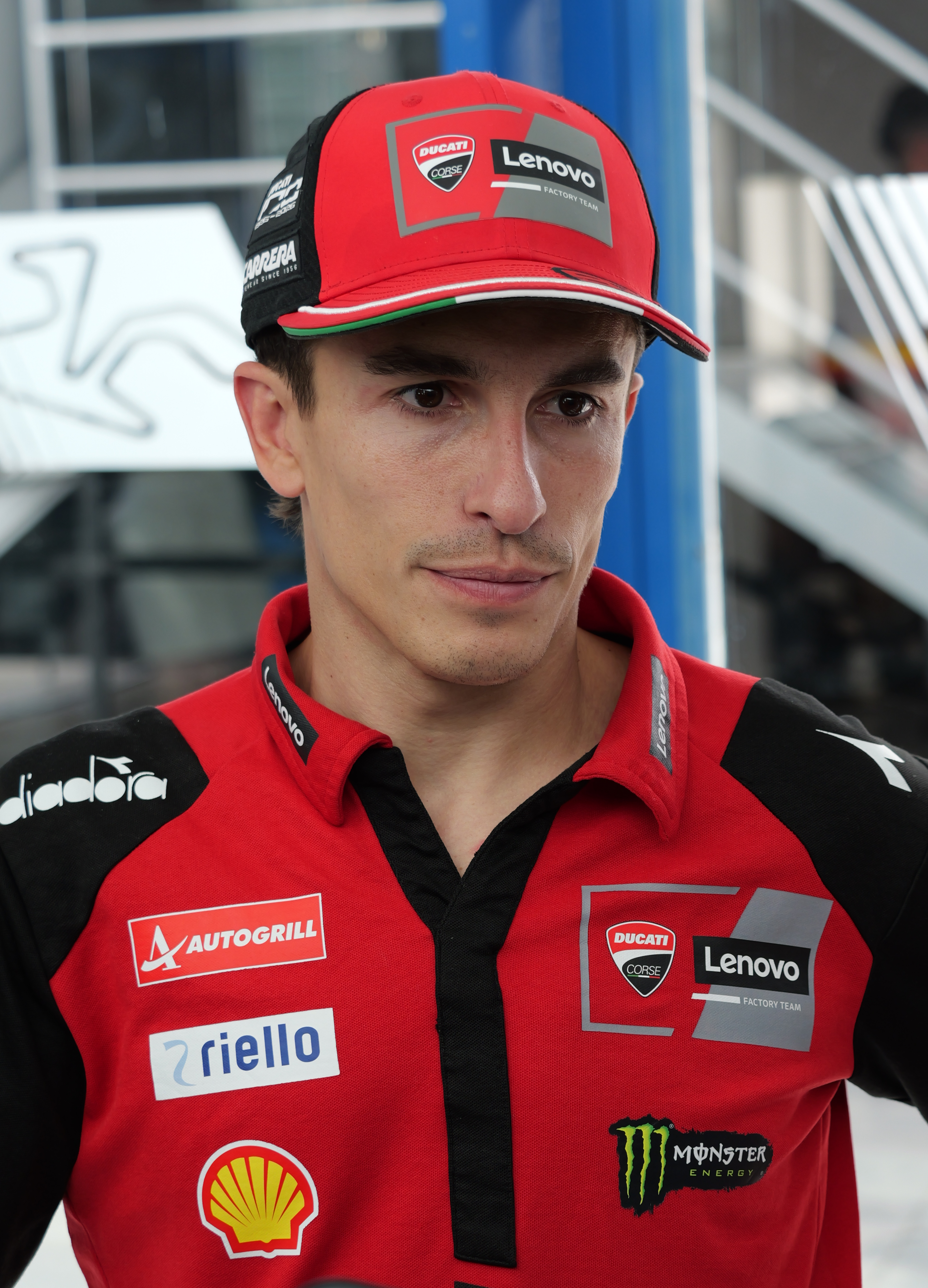
Marc Márquez (pictured in 2026) will enter the season as defending champion.

The 2027 FIM MotoGP World Championship will be the premier class of the 79th Fédération Internationale de Motocyclisme (FIM) Road Racing World Championship season, the highest level of competition in motorcycle road racing. The season will see the change of engine capacity from 1000cc to 850cc and the introduction of Pirelli series-specified tyres.

== Teams and riders ==
Team	Constructor	Motorcycle	No.	Rider
(Italy) Aprilia Racing	Aprilia	RS-GP27	63	(Italy) Francesco Bagnaia
(Italy) Aprilia Racing	Aprilia	RS-GP27	72	(Italy) Marco Bezzecchi
(United States) SuperFile Trackhouse MotoGP Team	Aprilia	RS-GP27	23	(Italy) Enea Bastianini
(United States) SuperFile Trackhouse MotoGP Team	Aprilia	RS-GP27	25	(Spain) Raúl Fernández
(Italy) Ducati Lenovo Team	Ducati	Desmosedici GP27	37	(Spain) Pedro Acosta
(Italy) Ducati Lenovo Team	Ducati	Desmosedici GP27	93	(Spain) Marc Márquez
(Italy) BK8 Gresini Racing MotoGP	Ducati	Desmosedici GP27	36	(Spain) Joan Mir
(Italy) BK8 Gresini Racing MotoGP	Ducati	Desmosedici GP27	TBA	(Spain) Daniel Holgado
(Italy) Pertamina Enduro VR46 Racing Team	Ducati	Desmosedici GP27	54	(Spain) Fermín Aldeguer
(Italy) Pertamina Enduro VR46 Racing Team	Ducati	Desmosedici GP27	TBA	(Italy) Nicolò Bulega
(Monaco) Castrol Honda LCR (Monaco) Pro Honda LCR	Honda	RC214V	5	(France) Johann Zarco
(Monaco) Castrol Honda LCR (Monaco) Pro Honda LCR	Honda	RC214V	TBA	(Colombia) David Alonso
(Japan) Honda HRC Castrol	Honda	RC214V	11	(Brazil) Diogo Moreira
(Japan) Honda HRC Castrol	Honda	RC214V	20	(France) Fabio Quartararo
(Austria) Red Bull KTM Factory Racing	KTM	TBA	49	(Italy) Fabio Di Giannantonio
(Austria) Red Bull KTM Factory Racing	KTM	TBA	73	(Spain) Álex Márquez
(France) Red Bull KTM Tech3	KTM	TBA	10	(Italy) Luca Marini
(France) Red Bull KTM Tech3	KTM	TBA	TBA	(Australia) Senna Agius
(Japan) Monster Energy Yamaha MotoGP Team	Yamaha	TBA	79	(Japan) Ai Ogura
(Japan) Monster Energy Yamaha MotoGP Team	Yamaha	TBA	89	(Spain) Jorge Martín
(Italy) Prima Pramac Yamaha MotoGP	Yamaha	TBA	7	(Turkey) Toprak Razgatlıoğlu
(Italy) Prima Pramac Yamaha MotoGP	Yamaha	TBA	TBA	(Spain) Izan Guevara

Key
Regular rider
Replacement rider

=== Rider changes ===
- Francesco Bagnaia will leave Ducati Lenovo Team after six seasons to join Aprilia Racing, replacing Jorge Martín who is moving to the Yamaha factory team.
- Pedro Acosta will move from Red Bull KTM Factory Racing, replacing Bagnaia at Ducati.
- Fabio Quartararo will leave the Yamaha factory team after six seasons to join the Honda factory team.
- Álex Rins will leave the Yamaha factory team after three seasons.
- Ai Ogura will move from Trackhouse MotoGP Team to join the Yamaha factory team.
- Joan Mir will join Gresini Racing, leaving the Honda factory team after four seasons. Daniel Holgado will partner him, replacing Álex Márquez and Fermín Aldeguer.
- Álex Márquez will join KTM Factory Racing after four seasons with Gresini Racing, replacing Acosta.
- Fermín Aldeguer will move from Gresini Racing to join VR46 Racing Team.
- Fabio Di Giannantonio will join KTM Factory Racing, leaving VR46 Racing Team after three seasons to replace Brad Binder who is set to join the ROKiT BMW Motorrad WorldSBK Team.
- David Alonso, 2024 Moto3 World Champion, will make his premier class debut with Pro Honda LCR.
- Enea Bastianini will move from Red Bull KTM Tech3 to join Trackhouse MotoGP Team.
- Luca Marini will join Red Bull KTM Tech3 after three seasons with the Honda factory team.
- Izan Guevara will make his premier class debut with Prima Pramac Yamaha MotoGP team, replacing Jack Miller who is set to join the PATA Maxus Yamaha team in World Superbikes.
- Nicolò Bulega, 2026 Superbike World Champion, will make his MotoGP debut with the VR46 Racing Team, replacing Franco Morbidelli who is set to join the Aruba.it Racing - Ducati team in World Superbikes.
- Senna Agius will make his premier class debut with Red Bull KTM Tech3 team.
- Diogo Moreira will move from Pro Honda LCR to join the Honda factory team.

== Rule changes ==
- The 2027 season will see the reduction of engine capacity from 1000cc to 850cc, with the maximum cylinder bore decreasing from 81 to 75 millimetres. The maximum number of engines allowed for each rider in a season will also be reduced from seven to six.
- For aerodynamics, The width of the top of the front fairing will be shortened by 50 millimetres and the nose will be pushed back by 50 millimetres. Aero components behind the rider will be homologated with teams only allowed one update per season.
- Any form of ride-height or holeshot devices will be banned.
- All competitors will gain access to GPS data from all riders at the end of each session.
- All teams will race with 100% sustainable fuel assessed via the C14 test. The fuels will no longer be obtained by crude oil refinement and they can be obtained by either bio-fuel or e-fuels obtained by direct atmosphere CO_{2}-capturing.
- Fuel tank capacity will be reduced from 22 to 20 litres with 11 litres being allowed for the Sprint race.
- The current concession system will resume, but with all manufacturers starting the season in Rank B.
- Pirelli will become the new official tyre supplier to MotoGP, replacing Michelin as sole tyre supplier on a five-year contract until 2031.
- Wildcards will be banned, regardless of concession rank.
- A new weekend format will be introduced featuring a dedicated qualifying session for the Sprint, resulting in separate starting positions for the Sprint and the Grand Prix. The format will include Sprint Qualifying on Friday, FP3 and Grand Prix qualifying on Saturday, followed by the Moto3 and Moto2 races ahead of the MotoGP Grand Prix on Sunday.

== Calendar ==
The following Grands Prix are provisionally scheduled to take place in 2027:

Round	Date	Grand Prix	Circuit	Ref.
1	7 March	Grand Prix of Thailand	Buriram International Circuit, Buriram	
2	14 March	Grand Prix of Qatar	Lusail International Circuit, Lusail	
3	4 April	Grand Prix of Brazil	Autódromo Internacional Ayrton Senna, Goiânia	
4	11 April	Grand Prix of Argentina	Autódromo Oscar y Juan Gálvez, Buenos Aires	
5	25 April	Grand Prix of the United States	Circuit of the Americas, Austin	
6	9 May	Grand Prix of Spain	Circuito de Jerez, Jerez de la Frontera	
7	16 May	Grand Prix of France	Bugatti Circuit, Le Mans	
8	30 May	Grand Prix of Italy	Mugello Circuit, Scarperia e San Piero	
9	13 June	Grand Prix of Catalonia	Circuit de Barcelona-Catalunya, Montmeló	
10	27 June	Grand Prix of the Netherlands	TT Circuit Assen, Assen	
11	11 July	Grand Prix of Germany	Sachsenring, Hohenstein-Ernstthal	
12	18 July	(Czech Republic) Grand Prix of Czechia	Brno Circuit, Brno	
13	15 August	(United Kingdom) Grand Prix of Great Britain	Silverstone Circuit, Silverstone	
14	29 August	Grand Prix of Austria	Red Bull Ring, Spielberg	
15	12 September	Grand Prix of San Marino and the Rimini Riviera	Misano World Circuit, Misano Adriatico	
16	19 September	Grand Prix of Aragon	MotorLand Aragón, Alcañiz	
17	3 October	Grand Prix of Portugal	Algarve International Circuit, Portimão	
18	17 October	Grand Prix of Japan	Motegi Circuit, Motegi	
19	24 October	Grand Prix of Malaysia	Sepang International Circuit, Sepang	
20	31 October	Grand Prix of Indonesia	Mandalika International Street Circuit, Mandalika	
21	14 November	Red Bull Grand Prix of Australia	Adelaide Street Circuit, Adelaide	
22	28 November	(Valencian Community) Grand Prix of Valencia	Circuit Ricardo Tormo, Valencia	

=== Calendar changes ===
- The Hungarian Grand Prix will not be returning to the calendar in 2027.
- The Argentine Grand Prix will return to the calendar after a one-year absence. It will be hosted at Autódromo Oscar y Juan Gálvez having last raced there in 1999, replacing the previous host Autódromo Termas de Río Hondo which has hosted the race since 2014.
- The Australian Grand Prix will move from the Phillip Island Grand Prix Circuit to a modified version of the Adelaide Street Circuit.
