= Jeff Ruminer =

American bicycle motocross rider (born 1962)

Personal information
- Full name: Jeffrey Ruminer
- Nickname: "The Flyin' Okie"
- Born: December 16, 1962 (age 63) United States
- Height: 1.80 m (5 ft 11 in)
- Weight: 81.6 kg (180 lb)

Cycling career
- Sport: Cycling
- Current team: Retired
- Discipline: Bicycle Motocross (BMX)
- Role: Racer
- Rider type: Off Road

Amateur teams
- 1976: Mongoose
- 1976-1977: DG/Bike Shoppe
- 1977: LRV Racing Products
- 1977-1978: Robinson
- 1978-1979: Redline

Professional teams
- 1979-1981: Redline
- 1982: MCS
- 1982-1985: Murray

Jeffrey Ruminer (born December 16, 1962, from Seminole, Oklahoma, United States) was a professional American "Old School" Bicycle Motocross (BMX) racer whose prime competitive years were from (1977–1985). He had the nickname "The Flyin' Okie" because he was from the state of Oklahoma and that "crazy guy who would jump anything."

== Racing career milestones ==
Note: Professional first are on the national level unless otherwise indicated.

Started racing: In 1975 at 12 years old. He saw a flyer for a BMX race at a grocery in Shawnee, Oklahoma 15 miles from his hometown of Seminole.

Sanctioning body: ()

First race result: First place in 12 boys class.

First win (local): See above.

Home Sanctioning body district/region: National Bicycle Association NBA Region K (Oklahoma); American Bicycle Association ABA District

First sponsor: Mongoose (BMX Products) 1976

First national win: In 12-13 Novice at the National Bicycle Association (NBA) Shawnee Nationals in Shawnee, Oklahoma, on July 17, 1976.

Turned Professional: In 1979 at 16 years old.

First Professional race result:

First Professional win:

Retired: In 1985 at 22 years old. His last was the American Bicycle Association (ABA) Grandnational on December 1, 1985. He came in fifth in Pro Cruiser winning US$90. His name does not appear in race results again. The Murray pro team disbanded after that race.

Height & weight at height of her career (1981): Ht:5'11" Wt:180 lbs.

=== Career factory and major bike shop sponsors ===
Note: This listing only denotes the racer's primary sponsors. At any given time a racer could have numerous ever changing co-sponsors. Primary sponsorships can be verified by BMX press coverage and sponsor's advertisements at the time in question. When possible exact dates are used.

==== Amateur ====
- Mongoose (BMX Products): Early 1976-July 1976
- D.G. Performance Specialties (The initials stood for Dan Hangsleben, Gary Harlow)/Bicycle Shoppe: July 1976-Early 1977
- LRV (Leisure Recreation Vehicles) Racing Products: Early 1977-Late 1977
- Robinson Racing Products: Late 1977-December 1978
- Redline Engineering: December 1978-December 1981 He turned pro with this sponsor.

==== Professional ====
- Redline Engineering: December 1978-December 1981
- MCS (Moto Cross Specialties) Bicycle Specialties: February 1982-Mid September 1982 His first race for MCS was the ABA Winternationals in Chandler, Arizona, on February 12, 1982.
- Murray of Ohio: September 1982-December 1, 1985. After his sponsorship by Murray ended he retired from competition.

=== Career bicycle motocross titles ===
Note: Listed are District, State/Provincial/Department, Regional, National, and International titles in italics. Depending on point totals of individual racers, winners of Grand Nationals do not necessarily win National titles. Only sanctioning bodies active during the racer's career are listed.

==== Amateur ====
National Bicycle Association (NBA)

- 1977 Oklahoma Region K No.3
- 1977 13-14 Expert South Pacific BMX Championships Champion.
- 1977 13-14 Expert Race of Champions (ROC) Champion

National Bicycle League (NBL)

American Bicycle Association (ABA)

United Bicycle Racers (UBR)

Fédération Internationale Amateur de Cyclisme (FIAC)

- None

International Bicycle Motocross Federation (IBMXF)

- None

==== Professional ====
National Bicycle Association (NBA)

National Bicycle League (NBL)

American Bicycle Association (ABA)

- None

United Bicycle Racers (UBR)

United States Bicycle Motocross Association (USBA)

- None

International Bicycle Motocross Federation (IBMXF)

- None

Fédération Internationale Amateur de Cyclisme (FIAC)

- None (FIAC did not have a strictly professional division during its existence) (defunct).

Pro Series Championships

=== Notable accolades ===
- Named by Bicycle Motocross News the no.1 racer of the Midwest/Southwest and Up And coming Rider of the Year for 1977.
- Ruminer is a 2001 ABA BMX Hall of Fame Inductee.

=== BMX product lines ===
- 1982 "JEFF RUMINER " signature Series one Haro number plate

=== Significant injuries ===
- Broke Ankle in August 1982

=== Miscellaneous ===
- He was the first non-Californian to win a Trophy Dash.
- He was one of the first members of the first full factory sponsored Redline team in 1978. Previously Redline Engineering only co sponsored racers in conjunction with other sponsors.
- His pants motto* was: "who cares?"
- He was also a High School football star in his native Oklahoma. He won individual titles like All Conference and All State Candidate playing for the Seminole Chieftains. He won a football scholarship to go to the University of Southern California (USC) as a running back

*Riders often put slogans on the seat of their pants instead of their surname as a small psychological ploy against their competitors behind them to read.

== Post BMX career ==
After the Murray of Ohio BMX team was disbanded, he felt it was time to move on with his life and attended college.

== BMX press magazine interviews and articles ==
- "The Flyin' Okie: Jeff Ruminer" Bicycle Motocross Action Vol.3 No.5 pg.32
- "Jeff Ruminer" Action Now August 1981 Vol.8 No.1 pg.56

== BMX magazine covers ==
Note: Only magazines that were in publication at the time of the racer's career(s) are listed unless specifically noted.

Bicycle Motocross News:

- None

Minicycle/BMX Action & Super BMX:

- None

Bicycle Motocross Action & Go:

- BMX Action October 1982 Vol.7 No.10 (8) in lower right insert In front of Bobby Woods. In top right insert Jeff Kosmala (27); in left center insert Andy Patterson.

BMX Plus!:

Total BMX

Bicycles and Dirt:

NBA World & NBmxA World (The official NBA/NBmxA membership publication):

Bicycles Today & BMX Today (The official NBL membership publication under two names):

ABA Action, American BMXer, BMXer (the official BMX publication of the ABA under three different names):
