= Jeff Kosmala =

American bicycle motocross rider (born 1961)

Personal information
- Full name: Jeffrey Kosmala
- Nickname: "Kos"
- Born: September 16, 1961 (age 65) United States
- Height: 1.85 m (6 ft 1 in)
- Weight: 85.3–95.2 kg (188–210 lb)

Cycling career
- Sport: Cycling
- Current team: Retired
- Discipline: Bicycle Motocross (BMX)
- Role: Racer
- Rider type: Off Road

Amateur team
- 1978–1977: Mongoose

Professional teams
- 1977–1982: Mongoose
- 1982–1983: Redline Engineering
- 1984: O'Neal

Jeffrey Kosmala (born September 16, 1961 from Van Nuys, California) is a retired professional American "Old School" Bicycle Motocross (BMX) racer whose prime competitive years were (1978–1981).

== Racing career milestones ==
Note: Professional first are on the national level unless otherwise indicated.

Started racing: 1973

Sanctioning body: ()

First race result:

First win (local): First recorded win records reveal was in 14 & over Novice on September 19, 1975, at the Van Nuys Youth Center.

First sponsor: Gus Dando's bikes

First national win: In 15 Expert at the National Bicycle Association (NBA) Supernationals in Trabuco Canyon, California on April 3, 1977.

Turned Professional: 14 yrs

First Professional race result: 1st Beat David Clinton

First Professional win:

First Junior Men Pro* race result: Not Applicable

First Junior Men Pro win: Not Applicable

First Senior Men Pro** race result:

First Senior Men Pro win:

Retired: Effectively 1983 shortly after he left Redline Engineering.

Height & weight at height of his career (1978–1981): Ht: 6'1" Wt: 188–210 lbs.

=== Career factory and major bike shop sponsors ===
Note: This listing only denotes the racer's primary sponsors. At any given time a racer could have numerous ever-changing cosponsors. Primary sponsorships can be verified by BMX press coverage and sponsor's advertisements at the time in question. When possible exact dates are used.

==== Amateur ====
- Mongoose (BMX Products): July 1977 March 1982 Kosmala turned pro with this sponsor.

==== Professional ====
- Mongoose: July 1977 – March 1982 As the biggest, fastest cruiser rider in the world . Jeff would line up on the starting line everyone else would try and figure out who was going to get second, in 1980 Jef won 21 out of 24 Nationals the ABA national #1 and the NBA national #1 and the JAG World Championship in the same year. To this day there is not more of a dominating year in the sport by one rider. The Kos Kruiser is the most winning bike of all time. According to Kosmala Mongoose wasn't going to pay him for his name on the Kos Kruiser which he was owed, it cost mongoose a lot more than Jeff was asking for.
- Redline Engineering: Early April 1982 – Early May 1983 Jeff took his talent to Redline Eng, where he designed and raced the "redline PL-24 " which he stayed on his winning ways. His first race for Redline was the NBL Detroit, Michigan National on April 17, 1982. He won Pro Cruiser. In the middle of the summer of 83 Jeff and his long-time girlfriend got married and he decided to hang up the bars.
- O'Neal: January 1984 — Kosmala got back into the BMX world by becoming a sales representative for O'Neal, a Motorcycle Motocross apperal company which was trying to break into the BMX market. Kosmala would occasionally race in O'Neal livery much like John George did for Mongoose after his retirement from competitive racing.

=== Career bicycle motocross titles ===
Note: Listed are District, State/Provincial/Department, Regional, National, and International titles in italics. Depending on point totals of individual racers, winners of Grand Nationals do not necessarily win National titles. Only sanctioning bodies active during the racer's career are listed.

==== Amateur ====
National Bicycle Association (NBA)

National Bicycle League (NBL)

- 1980 JAG 15-29 Cruiser World Champion.*

American Bicycle Association (ABA)

- 1980 Cruiser Grandnational Champion
- 1980 Cruiser National No. 1*

*Note: At this time the ABA Cruiser title was a Pro/Am title. Racers who were Professionals in the 20" class could race the amateurs in Cruiser class and win the title, but only trophies, not cash rewards.
Fédération Internationale Amateur de Cyclisme (FIAC)*

- None

International Bicycle Motocross Federation (IBMXF)*

- None

Union Cycliste Internationale (UCI)*

- None

*See note in professional section

==== Professional ====
National Bicycle Association (NBA)

- 1980 Pro Cruiser National No.1
- 1981 Pro 20" & and Pro Cruiser Western States Champion.

National Bicycle League (NBL)

- None

American Bicycle Association (ABA)

- None (See amateur section)

United States Bicycle Motocross Association (USBA)

- None

International Bicycle Motocross Federation (IBMXF)*

- None

Fédération Internationale Amateur de Cyclisme (FIAC)*

- None (FIAC did not have a strictly professional division during its existence) (defunct).

Union Cycliste Internationale (UCI)*

- None

*Note: Beginning in 1991 the IBMXF and FIAC had been holding joint World Championship events as a transitional phase in merging which began in earnest in 1993. Beginning with the 1996 season the IBMXF and FIAC completed the merger and both ceased to exist as independent entities being integrated into the UCI. Beginning with the 1997 World Championships held in Brighton, England the UCI would officially hold and sanction BMX World Championships and with it inherited all precedents, records, streaks, etc. from both the IBMXF and FIAC.
Pro Series Championships

=== Notable accolades ===
- He won the first ABA sanctioned jumping contest at the ABA Fall nationals in 1982. This jumping contest predated the King of Dirt (KOD) contest of the late 1980s and the emphasis was distance jumping and not aerial stunts maneuvers and height. He beat second-place finisher Ronnie Anderson by one inch.

=== BMX product lines ===
- 1979 Mongoose "Kos Kruiser"

Product Evaluation:

"Kos Kruiser Test" BMX Plus! December 1980 Vol. 3 No. 12 p. 70 (1980 Model).
"Jeff Kosmala and the Kos Kruiser" Bicycle Motocross Action February 1981 Vol. 6 No. 2 p. 60

=== Significant injuries ===
- Broke thumb at the NBA United States Grand Prix (U.S.G.P) in Las Vegas, Nevada He had his cast shaped like a "C" in order to grip the handle bars
- Broke his wrist at the 1983 NBL WOS Memphis double header in Memphis, Tennessee.

=== Miscellaneous ===
His pants motto* was "Just Be Kos/ nice try/ Kid Kos "

*Riders often put slogans on the seat of their pants instead of their surname as a small physiological ploy against their competitors behind them to read.

== Post BMX career ==
- He is still in Las Vegas has 3 beautiful kids

== BMX press magazine interviews and articles ==
- "The Thrill Of Victory, The Agony of ... Victory" BMX Action January 1983 Vol. 8 No. 1 p. 42
- "Jeff Kosmala: Superstar" Bicycles and Dirt January 1983 Vol. 1 No. 5 p. 27.

== BMX magazine covers ==
Note: Only magazines that were in publication at the time of the racer's career(s) are listed unless specifically noted.

Bicycle Motocross News:

- None

Minicycle/BMX Action & Super BMX:

Bicycle Motocross Action & Go:

- BMX Action October 1982 Vol.7 No.10 (27) in top right insert. In center left insert Andy Patterson; in bottom right insert Jeff Ruminer (8) ahead of Bobby Woods.

BMX Plus!:

- June 1980 Vol. No. 6

Action Now:

Total BMX:

Bicycles and Dirt:

- January 1983 Vol.1 No.5

NBA World, NBmx World (the official BMX publication of the NBA):

Bicycles Today & BMX Today (the official BMX publication of the NBL):

ABA Action, American BMXer, BMXer (the official BMX publication of the ABA under three different names):
