= Andy Patterson =

American BMX racer (born 1964)

Personal information
- Full name: Andrew Patterson
- Nicknames: "Bigfoot", "Mr. Bigfoot"
- Born: January 19, 1964 (age 62) San Fernando Valley, California, United States
- Height: 6 ft 3 in (191 cm)
- Weight: 185 lb (84 kg)

Cycling career
- Sport: Cycling
- Current team: Retired
- Discipline: Bicycle Motocross (BMX)
- Role: Racer
- Rider type: Off Road

Amateur teams
- 1978: Addicks Engineering
- 1979: TW Racing
- 1979-1981: GT Racing
- 1981-1982: Skyway Recreations

Professional teams
- 1982-1984: Skyway Recreations
- 1984-1985: JMC Racing Equipment
- 1985: MBK (Motobecane)
- 1986-1990: Retired
- 1990: Cal Custom

Andrew Patterson (born January 19, 1964) is an American former professional "Old School" Bicycle Motocross (BMX) racer whose prime competitive years were from 1977 to 1985. His moniker was "Mr. Bigfoot" for his size 13 feet. Patterson was one of the first American racers to compete on the European BMX circuit during its formative years on a regular basis. He developed a large European following.

== Racing career milestones ==
Note: Professional first are on the national level unless otherwise indicated.

Milestone	Event Details
Started racing:	At 5 years old in 1969 at a local boys club. but this wasn't the true start of his career. Over five years later when he was 11 years old in late February 1975 was the true start. His father had brought him a Dan Gurney monoshock bicycle for Christmas. Approximately two months later he found a track while riding in his bike in Little Lake Park in Norwalk, California. He told his father and he started taking Andy racing. He raced about once a month for a year, then when the LaMiranda Regional Park open up he started racing twice a month.
Sanctioning body:	
Sanctioning body district(s):	
First race bike:	A Dan Gurney monoshock he got for Christmas (Christmas 1974 when he was 10 years old).
First race result:	Fourth in 11 Novice. Indeed, he got fourth in his first seven races.
First win (local):	After seven consecutive fourth place finishes he won on his eighth race. Then he got seven consecutive wins and move up to Expert. He then won his first Expert race.
First sponsor:	
First national win:	In 1979 in 16 Expert at a national in San Antonio, Texas, at the post race. In the National itself the day before he got a fourth.
Turned professional:	November 27, 1982, at age 18.
First professional race result:	Second in "A" pro at the 1982 American Bicycle Association (ABA) Grandnationals in Oklahoma City, Oklahoma, on November 28, 1982. He won US$400, the equivalent of US$852.64 in 2007 (Cost of Living Calculator). He also came in seventh in Pro Open. He won US$50, $106.58 in 2007.
First professional win:	In "A" pro at the 1982 Jag BMX World Championship of Bicycle Motocross V (ABA sanctioned) in Las Vegas, Nevada, on December 27, 1982. He won US$750, which is US$1,598.70 in 2007.
First Junior Men/pro* race result:	See "First Professional race result".
First Junior Men/pro win:	See "First Professional win".
First Senior pro** race result:	Seventh in "Pro" class at the 1983 International BMX Federation (IBMXF) World Championships in Slagharen, Overijssel, Netherlands. No pro purse was awarded. In the Pro class he raced against Senior pros like Clint Miller. There was no "B" pro or Superclass category at the time. However, this probably didn't count since upon return to the United States he returned to racing in the junior pro class. There his first Senior Pro race was the 1984 ABA Supernationals in late January. He did not make the main.
First Senior pro win:	
Height and weight at height of his career (1981–1984):	Ht:6'3" Wt:185 lbs.
Retired:	Faded out after the 1986 season. He raced a few times after that but not seriously, similar to Stu Thomsen's once or twice a year pro races at nationals after he officially retired early in the 1987 season. In 1990 Andy Patterson had him reclassified as a single "A" junior pro with the ABA and raced the ABA U.S Nationals in Lemoore, California, on April 21, 1990. He won

*In the NBL "B" Pro/Super Class/"A" Pro/Junior Elite Men depending on the era; in the ABA it is "A" Pro.
**In the NBL it is "AA" Pro/Elite Men; in the ABA it is "AA" Pro.

=== Career factory and major bike shop sponsors ===
Note: This listing only denotes the racer's primary sponsors. At any given time a racer could have numerous and ever-changing co-sponsors. Primary sponsorships can be verified by BMX press coverage and sponsor's advertisements at the time in question. When possible exact dates are used.

==== Amateur ====
- Addicks Engineering:
- TW Racing: -June 1979
- GT Bicycles June 1979-December 11, 1981
- Skyway Recreations: December 12, 1981-June 1984. He changed sponsorship to Skyway Recreations just before the third day of the 1981 NBA Grand Nationals. He raced for GT on the December 10 & 11 then showed up and raced for Skyway on the 12th.

==== Professional ====
- Skyway Recreations: December 12, 1981-June 1984. Andy Patterson left Skyway because Skyway wanted him to continue doing European racing circuit tours and promotionals. Patterson for his part felt like he was missing out on the big money races and the high competition level of the American racers. The lack of coverage of European races by the BMX press in the United States was another factor. According to Patterson, lack of coverage lead to the perception by American readers that he was out of BMX. Patterson felt out of touch due to this and wanted to return to the American circuit.
- JMC (James Melton Cyclery) Racing Equipment, Inc.: June 1984-Early April 1985. JMC Racing shut down in July 1985.
- MBK (Motobecane): 1985. This was his sponsor when he raced in Europe.
- ODI: Late Summer 1985. Not only Patterson was sponsored by ODI he worked for them during the week.
- (largely retired between late 1985 and 1990)
- Cal Custom: 1990

=== Career bicycle motocross titles ===
Note: Listed are District, State/Provincial/Department, Regional, National, and International titles in italics. "Defunct" refers to the fact of that sanctioning body in question no longer existing at the start of the racer's career or at that stage of his/her career. Depending on point totals of individual racers, winners of Grand Nationals do not necessarily win National titles. Series and one off Championships are also listed in block.

==== Amateur ====
National Bicycle Association (NBA)

- 1979 15 Novice Grandnational Champion
- 1981 16 & Over Expert & Overall Race of Champions (ROC) Champion*. He won a moped for this victory.
- 1981 16 & Over Expert Grandnational Champion. This was the last NBA Grandnational before the NBA merged with the NBL.

*The NBA ROC was a yearly one shot Invitational collection of the nation's top amateur 16 Experts chosen through a BMX industry poll who race for the title to nominally to see who is the best older amateur in the country. It was held in conjunction with the NBA Grandnational just as the NBL's Presidents Cup today is held before its Grandnational and the ABA's US Gold/Redline Cup were periodically held before its Grandnational.

National Bicycle League (NBL)

- None

American Bicycle Association (ABA)

- 1981 16 Expert, 14-25 Cruiser, and 15 & Over Trophy Dash Grandnational Champion (triple)
- 1982 17 Expert Northwest Gold Cup Champion

United Bicycle Racers (UBR)

- 1981 14-22 Cruiser and 14 & Over 16" Pit Bike Grandnational Champion (double)

United States Bicycle Motocross Association (USBA)

- None

Fédération Internationale Amateur de Cyclisme (FIAC)**

- None

International Bicycle Motocross Federation (IBMXF)**

- 1981 16 & Over Cruiser International Champion

Union Cycliste Internationale (UCI)**

- None

Independent Invitationals and Amateur Series Championships

- 1982 Anglo/American Challenge Cup Champion*

* The Anglo/American Challenge Cup II was an Invitational Exhibition race held in Redditch, England at the Hartfords track. It was a way for the English racers to gauge themselves against the Americans. In the second main of a three main final British racer Tim March became the first English racer to beat any American in any head to head race in a moto.

**See note in professional section.

==== Professional ====
National Bicycle Association (NBA)

- None

National Bicycle League (NBL)

- None

United Bicycle Racers (UBR)

American Bicycle Association (ABA)

- 1982 Jag BMX "A" Pro World Champion (ABA sanctioned)

United States Bicycle Motocross Association (USBA)

- None

International Bicycle Motocross Federation (IBMXF)*

- 1982 20" Superclass & 16 Expert Invitational Class Open European Champion (double)
- 1983 20" Superclass Invitational Class Open European Champion

Fédération Internationale Amateur de Cyclisme (FIAC)*

- None

Union Cycliste Internationale (UCI)*

- None

*Note: Beginning in 1991 the IBMXF and FIAC, the amateur cycling arm of the UCI, had been holding joint World Championship events as a transitional phase in merging which began in earnest in 1993. Beginning with the 1996 season the IBMXF and FIAC completed the merger and both ceased to exist as independent entities being integrated into the UCI. Beginning with the 1996 World Championships held in Brighton, England the UCI would officially hold and sanction BMX World Championships and with it inherited all precedents, records, streaks, etc. from both the IBMXF and FIAC.

Independent Invitationals and Pro Series Championship

=== BMX product lines ===
- Skyway Recreations Andy Patterson Signature Tuff Wheels

Product Evaluations:

- JMC "Andy Patterson Series" frame and fork set introduced August 2, 1984. Only 333 made.

Product Evaluations:

BMX Plus! March 1985 Vol.8 No.3 pg.24

=== Significant injuries ===
- Patterson broke his foot during practice at the Harbor BMX track in San Pedro, California, in early October 1983. The starting gate slammed down onto it. It happened approximately five weeks after he won the European Open Championship in France in June 1983. He was laid up for approximately three months.

=== Racing habits and traits ===
- One of the few top BMX racers to stick to the outmoded one pedal start well into the 1980s. He couldn't ever get used to doing the balance two pedal start that became standard in the early 1980s. He just felt more comfortable with the one pedal start and felt if he was able to time the gate correctly he could get out of the gate faster than anyone else, including those who used two pedal starts.

One pedal starts involved rearing back with your arms straight out and almost parallel to the ground with one foot behind and to aside the rear wheel. The other foot was on a pedal that was extended forward and the front tire pushing against the starting gate. When the gate dropped a rider would lunge forward placing his weight on the lead pedal, accelerating him out of the gate. If timed right with a quick reaction a racer can get a jump on the others out of the gate called the holeshot. By the early 1980s two pedal starts became the mode in which the vast majority of top racers used. It was almost exactly identical to the one pedal start except the trailing foot was on the trailing pedal as with the leading foot was on the leading pedal. The racer maintained his balance with the friction of the front tire pressed against the gate and the racer subtlety shifting his weight to counteract the imbalance. Getting out of the gate was similar to the one pedal start in that the racer lunged his weight forward against the handle bars while pressing his full weight and leg strength against the lead pedal. Simultaneously you use your upper body strength to quickly pull the bike forward with the handle bars. By the early 1980s most racers felt that this provided a quicker start to the old one pedal start with the advantage of not having to find the rear pedal with trailing foot. Since it is already on the pedal you can concentrate fully on starting and getting out of the gate a second sooner than anyone using a one pedal start technique. Ironically, the sanctioning bodies in the early 80's to cut down on gate jumping by those using the two pedal start who could time the cadence of the gate lights because it fell at a set period of time every time (they use starting lights much like those on a top fuel drag racing drag strip). In 1985 the ABA switched to dead man gates in which the green light didn't light and the gate fall in a predictable fashion making timing the gate difficult (the gate still fell the instant the light turned green of course). Concentrating on when the light turn green was critical with reaction time to that was critical. This made two pedal starts even more of a premium, making one pedal starts unheard off by the mid to late 1980s.

- He never won a Senior pro Main at a national with any American sanctioning body.

=== Miscellaneous and trivia ===
- Andy Patterson is NOT related to the BMX racing brother combination of Brent & Brian Patterson.
- He was also a competent freestyle rider practicing flatland and bowl riding routines and maneuvers. He belonged to an informal trick teem called Freestyle Force. However, he viewed himself primarily as racer and not a freestyle rider to the extent of him turning down offers from companies like Pepsi Cola to put on demonstration shows with his trick team. It was just something of a deversion:

BMX Plus!: "Did anyone like Haro ever approach you and ask you to tricks [sic] for them?"
Andy Patterson: "Not really. I don't really want to get that much involved in it. I didn't even want to get involved when Pepsi called up and wanted me to do demos for them. It's just in my spare time when I'm not in a race, and I can earn some money by doing it--then I go ahead and do it." ---BMX Plus! September 1982.

- He had a step brother named Tosh Muraviov who raced 12 Expert class on the CW Racing team in 1982.
- He is known by close friends and family as "Pato".

== BMX and general press magazine interviews and articles ==
- "Burning Ambition" Super BMX October 1981 Vol.8 No.10 pg.44
- "Interview: Andy Patterson" BMX Plus! September 1982 Vol.5 No.9 pg.43
- "Fast Talk: Where oh where is Andy Patterson?"BMX Plus! November 1984 Vol.7 No.11 pg.36 mini interview covering why he left Skyway Recreations.
- "Our BMX Ambassador" Super BMX & Freestyle March 1985 Vol.12 No.3 pg.10. An in-depth article about his racing tours in Europe and why he left Skyway Recreations and joined JMC Racing. In same issue he is posing in the centerfold poster with actress Bobbi Pavis.

== BMX magazine covers ==
Note: Only magazines that were in publication at the time of the racer's career(s) are listed unless specifically noted.

Bicycle Motocross News:

- None

Minicycle/BMX Action & Super BMX:

- March 1982 Vol.9 No.3 (SBMX)
- May 1983 Vol.10 No.5 (SBMX)

Bicycle Motocross Action & Go:

- BMX Action October 1982 Vol.7 No.10 in left center insert. In top right insert Jeff Kosmala (27); in bottom right insert Jeff Ruminer (8) ahead of Bobby Woods.

BMX Plus!:

- September 1982 Vol.5 No.9
- March 1985 Vol.8 No.3 in insert. Main image: Stunt BMXer Jose Yarnez pulling off a back flip. Racers Stu Thomsen, Scott Clark and Freestylers Mike Dominquez and Woody Itson can be seen in the audience at the bottom.

Total BMX:

- May 1982

Bicycles and Dirt (ABA Publication):

- None

BMX Weekly & BMX Bi-Weekly (British Publication)

- February 1984 Vol.4 Issue 6 (BBIWLY)

BMX Action Bike (British publication):

- September 1983 Iss.11

Australian BMX Pancake (Australian publication):

- 1982 Issue No.3

NBA World & NBmxA World (The official NBA/NBmxA membership publication):

Bicycles Today & BMX Today (The NBL official membership publication under two names):

ABA Action, American BMXer, BMXer (The ABA official membership publication under three names):

USBA Racer (The official USBA membership publication):
