= Nicolò Bulega =

Italian motorcycle racer (born 1999)

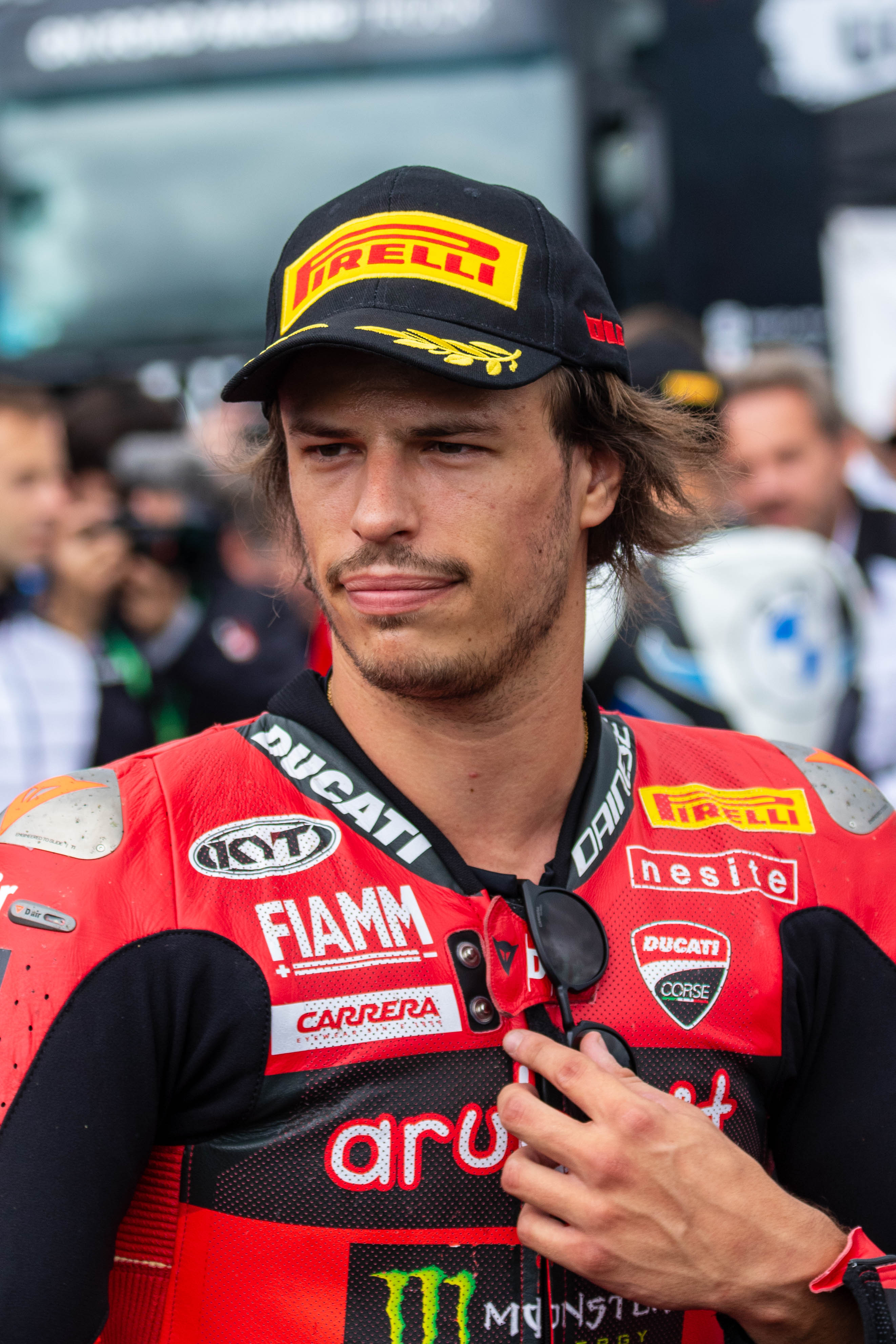
- Bulega in 2024
- Nationality: Italian
- Born: 16 October 1999 (age 27); Montecchio Emilia, Italy
- Current team: Aruba.it Racing – Ducati
- Bike number: 11
- Website: buleganicolo.com/en
Motorcycle racing career statistics
MotoGP World Championship
Active years	2025
Manufacturers	Ducati
Championships	0
2025 championship position	27th (2 pts)
Starts / Wins / Podiums / Poles / F. laps / Points; 2 / 0 / 0 / 0 / 0 / 2
Moto2 World Championship
Active years	2019–2021
Manufacturers	Kalex
Championships	0
2021 championship position	26th (12 pts)
Starts / Wins / Podiums / Poles / F. laps / Points; 49 / 0 / 0 / 0 / 0 / 92
Moto3 World Championship
Active years	2015–2018
Manufacturers	KTM
Championships	0
2018 championship position	26th (18 pts)
Starts / Wins / Podiums / Poles / F. laps / Points; 50 / 0 / 2 / 2 / 2 / 232
Superbike World Championship
Active years	2024–2026
Manufacturers	Ducati
Championships	1 (2026)
2026 championship position	1st (726 pts)
Starts / Wins / Podiums / Poles / F. laps / Points; 108 / 52 / 92 / 20 / 56 / 1813
Supersport World Championship
Active years	2022–2023
Manufacturers	Ducati
Championships	1 (2023)
2023 championship position	1st (503 pts)
Starts / Wins / Podiums / Poles / F. laps / Points; 48 / 16 / 30 / 10 / 14 / 745

Nicolò Bulega (born 16 October 1999) is an Italian motorcycle racer. He won the 2023 Supersport World Championship with Aruba.it Racing WorldSSP Team before going on to win the 2026 Superbike World Championship with Aruba.it Racing – Ducati. He became the first rider in history to win both the WorldSSP and WorldSBK World Championships. He has also been a competitor in the CEV Moto3 Championship in 2014 and 2015, becoming Moto3 Junior World Champion in 2015. Prior to competing in the CEV, Bulega won the Italian and European MiniGP 50 championships, and was Italian champion in the PreGP 125 and PreGP 250 classes.

Bulega is the son of former Grand Prix motorcycle racer, Davide Bulega. He is set to leave the Superbike World Championship to join the VR46 Racing Team for the 2027 season.

== Career ==
=== Early career ===
Born in Montecchio Emilia, Bulega started his career at the age of eight in the Italian Minimoto Championship. In 2010, he made his debut in MiniGP 50, in both the Italian and European championships, winning both in 2011. In 2012, he won the Italian Championship 125 PreGP, and in the following year, he won the Italian Championship Pre GP 250. As a result, he moved into the CEV Moto3 Championship for the 2014 season, he finished sixth overall in his rookie season with two podium finishes. He would then go on to win the 2015 season.

=== Moto3 World Championship ===
==== Sky Racing Team VR46 (2015–2018) ====
===== 2015 =====
In 2015, Bulega made his Grand Prix debut with Sky Racing Team VR46 riding a KTM in the Valencian Grand Prix, and finished the race in twelfth place, scoring four points.

===== 2016 =====
In 2016, Bulega started competing full-time in the Moto3 World Championship with Sky Racing Team VR46. He started the 2016 season with a sixth place at Qatar. At his fifth race in Moto3, Bulega achieved his first Grand Prix podium at Jerez with a second place finish having started from pole position, which was his first pole position in Grand Prix racing. Bulega's first fastest lap came at the British Grand Prix on the last lap. Followed by a crash in Aragon, on his birthday, Bulega finished the Japanese Grand Prix in fourth place, and again set the fastest lap. However, after third placed rider Hiroki Ono was disqualified, Bulega was awarded third place. In both Australia and Malaysia, Bulega crashed on the opening lap. Despite qualifying fourth, Bulega started the final race at Valencia in 16th place due to a 12 place grid penalty, and finished the race in 17th, thus losing the 'Rookie of the year' title to Joan Mir. Bulega finished the championship in seventh place with 129 points.

===== 2017 =====
In a year where former Rookie of the Year rival Joan Mir won the 2017 Moto3 World Championship, Bulega struggled to replicate his debut season. His difficulties included bad qualifying strategies and bad starts (mainly due to his height), and his best results of the year were a fourth place in Germany, one of the few times he was able to qualify in the top-six, and two fifth places, in his "home" race in Rimini, and in the USA. He finished a disappointing season in 12th place, with 81 points.

===== 2018 =====
Bulega's 2018 season was even worse than 2017. He retired in the first four races, and finished the fifth race, only 17th in Spain, being one of the two regular riders to not score points in the first five races of the year. His only top-ten finish came in Thailand, where he finished seventh. He ended the season with a mere 18 points, and 26th in the standings.

=== Moto2 World Championship ===
==== Sky Racing Team VR46 (2019) ====
===== 2019 =====
For the 2019 Moto2 World Championship, despite his poor results, and mainly due to his height and weight on smaller bikes, Bulega was given an opportunity in Moto2 by Sky Racing Team VR46, partnering Luca Marini. He performed somewhat better, with four top-ten finishes in the Spanish, French, Czech, and Thai GPs, but finished 17th in the standings with 48 points. Marini ended in sixth, with 190 points, and four podiums (two victories), and Sky VR46 decided not to keep Bulega for a second season.

==== Federal Oil Gresini Moto2 (2020–2021) ====
===== 2020 =====
In the 2020 Moto2 World Championship, Bulega was partnered by Edgar Pons at Gresini. Bulega once again had a bad year, only finishing in the top-ten twice, ending the season 20th in the standings, with 32 points. Luckily for him, Pons had an even worse season, finishing with points in just two races.

===== 2021 =====
For the 2021 season, Bulega's teammate was Fabio Di Giannantonio. Di Giannantonio finished on the podium three times, winning a race in Jerez, while Bulega only finished in a point scoring position three times throughout the season. His 12 points of the season were Bulega's lowest ever of a full season in his career, and due to his bad performance, Gresini elected not to keep him for the 2022 season.

=== Supersport World Championship ===
==== Aruba.it Racing - Ducati (2022-2023) ====
On September 22, 2021, it was announced that Bulega would join Aruba.it Racing for his first season in the 2022 Supersport World Championship. He finished in fourth place in the standings at the end of his first season in this category.

On Saturday, 30 September 2023, Bulega was crowned the 2023 World Champion with three races to spare after taking 14 wins and 18 podiums up to and including Race 1 at the Portuguese Round.

His future was confirmed after he was announced as Álvaro Bautista's 2024 teammate at the factory Ducati squad in Superbike World Championship.

=== Superbike World Championship ===
==== Aruba.it Racing - Ducati (2024-2026) ====
In 2024, Bulega finished his debut season with the Factory Ducati Team in second place in the championship. He won six races and finished second on 15 occasions, battling it out with Toprak Razgatlıoğlu.

In 2025, Bulega finished runner-up in the championship, bringing his total to 20 Superbike victories.

On Sunday, 27 September 2026, Bulega was crowned the 2026 World Champion with six races to spare after taking 26 wins and 30 podiums up to and including Race 2 at the Italian Round.

Bulega will leave the Superbike World Championship at the end of 2026 as he switches to racing in the MotoGP World Championship for 2027.

=== MotoGP World Championship ===
==== Ducati Corse (2025) ====
Bulega replaced Marc Márquez for the final two races of the 2025 season after testing the Ducati Desmosedici GP in a private test at Jerez in 30 & 31 October 2025.

==== Ducati Corse test rider (2026) ====
Ducati Corse hired Bulega as a test rider for the 2026 season. He joins the Borgo Panigale manufacturer's test team with Michele Pirro next season, opening up opportunities and possibilities for MotoGP in line with the 2027 regulations. He will support Ducati Corse in the development project of the bike focusing on the Pirelli tires.

==== VR46 Racing Team (2027–) ====
On September 9, 2026, VR46 Racing Team announced that Bulega will move from Superbike World Championship to MotoGP in 2027.

== Career statistics ==
=== FIM CEV Moto3 Junior World Championship ===
==== Races by year ====
(key) (Races in bold indicate pole position, races in italics indicate fastest lap)

Year	Bike	1	2	3	4	5	6	7	8	9	10	11	12	Pos	Pts
2014	KTM	JER1; 16	JER2; 7	LMS; 13	ARA; 7	CAT1; 16	CAT2; 10	ALB; 6	NAV; 3	ALG; 2	VAL1; 4	VAL2; 7		6th	95
2015	KTM	ALG; 3	LMS; 6	CAT1; 3	CAT2; 4	ARA1; 7	ARA2; 5	ALB; 2	NAV; 2	**JER1**; 2	**JER2**; 1	**VAL1**; 4	**VAL2**; 3	1st	189

=== Grand Prix motorcycle racing ===
==== By season ====
Season	Class	Motorcycle	Team	Race	Win	Podium	Pole	FLap	Pts	Plcd
2015	Moto3	KTM	Sky Racing Team VR46	1	0	0	0	0	4	31st
2016	Moto3	KTM	Sky Racing Team VR46	18	0	2	1	2	129	7th
2017	Moto3	KTM	Sky Racing Team VR46	17	0	0	1	0	81	12th
2018	Moto3	KTM	Sky Racing Team VR46	14	0	0	0	0	18	26th
2019	Moto2	Kalex	Sky Racing Team VR46	18	0	0	0	0	48	17th
2020	Moto2	Kalex	Federal Oil Gresini Moto2	15	0	0	0	0	32	20th
2021	Moto2	Kalex	Federal Oil Gresini Moto2	16	0	0	0	0	12	26th
2025	MotoGP	Ducati	Ducati Lenovo Team	2	0	0	0	0	2	27th
Total				**101**	**0**	**2**	**2**	**2**	**326**	

==== By class ====
Class	Seasons	1st GP	1st pod	1st win	Race	Win	Podiums	Pole	FLap	Pts	WChmp
Moto3	2015–2018	2015 Valencia	2016 Spain		50	0	2	2	2	232	0
Moto2	2019–2021	2019 Qatar			49	0	0	0	0	92	0
MotoGP	2025	2025 Portugal			2	0	0	0	0	2	0
Total	2015–2021, 2025				**101**	**0**	**2**	**2**	**2**	**326**	**0**

==== Races by year ====
(key) (Races in bold indicate pole position, races in italics indicate fastest lap)

Year	Class	Bike	1	2	3	4	5	6	7	8	9	10	11	12	13	14	15	16	17	18	19	20	21	22	Pos	Pts
2015	Moto3	KTM	QAT	AME	ARG	SPA	FRA	ITA	CAT	NED	GER	IND	CZE	GBR	RSM	ARA	JPN	AUS	MAL	VAL; 12					31st	4
2016	Moto3	KTM	QAT; 6	ARG; 18	AME; 10	**SPA**; 2	FRA; 5	ITA; 8	CAT; 5	NED; 7	GER; Ret	AUT; 9	CZE; 9	GBR; 5	RSM; 4	ARA; Ret	JPN; 3	AUS; Ret	MAL; Ret	VAL; 17					7th	129
2017	Moto3	KTM	QAT; 14	ARG; 16	AME; 5	SPA; 7	FRA; 17	ITA; 10	CAT; 9	NED; 10	GER; 4	CZE; 23	AUT; 11	GBR; 20	RSM; 5	ARA; 14	**JPN**; 12	AUS; 11	MAL; Ret	VAL; DNS					12th	81
2018	Moto3	KTM	QAT; Ret	ARG; Ret	AME; Ret	SPA; 17	FRA; Ret	ITA; 21	CAT; Ret	NED; 11	GER; 14	CZE; 19	AUT; 23	GBR; C	RSM; Ret	ARA; 14	THA; 7	JPN	AUS	MAL	VAL				26th	18
2019	Moto2	Kalex	QAT; Ret	ARG; Ret	AME	SPA; 9	FRA; 10	ITA; Ret	CAT; 13	NED; Ret	GER; 18	CZE; 7	AUT; 13	GBR; 20	RSM; Ret	ARA; 12	THA; 8	JPN; Ret	AUS; 12	MAL; 12	VAL; 22				17th	48
2020	Moto2	Kalex	QAT; 18	SPA; 14	ANC; 12	CZE; 14	AUT; 16	STY; 13	RSM; 15	EMI; 11	CAT; Ret	FRA; Ret	ARA; 18	TER; 17	EUR; 8	VAL; 9	POR; Ret								20th	32
2021	Moto2	Kalex	QAT; 22	DOH; 17	POR; Ret	SPA; Ret	FRA; 11	ITA; DNS	CAT; 17	GER; 11	NED; 19	STY; 22	AUT; 22	GBR; 14	ARA; Ret	RSM; 17	AME; DNS	EMI; 18	ALR; 22	VAL; 24					26th	12
2025	MotoGP	Ducati	THA	ARG	AME	QAT	SPA	FRA	GBR	ARA	ITA	NED	GER	CZE	AUT	HUN	CAT	RSM	JPN	INA	AUS	MAL	POR; 15	VAL; 15	27th	2

=== Supersport World Championship ===
==== Races by year ====
(key) (Races in bold indicate pole position; races in italics indicate fastest lap)

Year	Bike	1	2	3	4	5	6	7	8	9	10	11	12	13	14	15	16	17	18	19	20	21	22	23	24	Pos	Pts
2022	Ducati	SPA; 5	SPA; 3	NED; 3	NED; 4	POR; 3	POR; Ret	ITA; 3	ITA; 3	GBR; Ret	GBR; 3	CZE; 9	CZE; 2	FRA; 11	FRA; 3	SPA; Ret	SPA; 14	POR; 15	POR; 10	ARG; 11	ARG; 8	INA; 6	INA; 7	AUS; 2	AUS; 4	4th	242
2023	Ducati	AUS; 1	AUS; 1	**INA**; 5	**INA**; 3	**NED**; 1	**NED**; 1	**SPA**; 1	**SPA**; Ret	**ITA**; 1	**ITA**; 2	**GBR**; 1	**GBR**; 1	ITA; 3	ITA; 2	**CZE**; 1	**CZE**; 16	**FRA**; 1	**FRA**; 1	**SPA**; 1	**SPA**; 1	**POR**; 1	**POR**; 2	**SPA**; 1	**SPA**; 1	1st	503

=== Superbike World Championship ===
==== By season ====
Season	Motorcycle	Team	Race	Win	Podium	Pole	FLap	Pts	Plcd
2024	Ducati Panigale V4R	Aruba.it Racing – Ducati	36	6	24	4	11	484	**2nd**
2025	Ducati Panigale V4R	Aruba.it Racing – Ducati	36	14	32	5	14	603	**2nd**
2026	Ducati Panigale V4R	Aruba.it Racing – Ducati	36	32	36	11	31	726	**1st**
Total			**108**	**52**	**92**	**20**	**56**	**1813**	

==== Races by year ====
(key) (Races in bold indicate pole position) (Races in italics indicate fastest lap)

Year	Bike	1			2			3			4			5			6			7			8			9			10			11			12			Pos	Pts
Year	Bike	R1	SR	R2	R1	SR	R2	R1	SR	R2	R1	SR	R2	R1	SR	R2	R1	SR	R2	R1	SR	R2	R1	SR	R2	R1	SR	R2	R1	SR	R2	R1	SR	R2	R1	SR	R2	Pos	Pts
2024	Ducati	**AUS**; 1	**AUS**; 5	AUS; 5	SPA; 2	SPA; 4	SPA; 2	NED; 11	NED; 2	NED; 8	ITA; 2	ITA; 2	ITA; 2	GBR; 4	GBR; 2	GBR; 2	CZE; 6	CZE; 2	CZE; 2	POR; 7	POR; 5	POR; 2	FRA; Ret	FRA; 1	FRA; 1	**ITA**; 2	**ITA**; 4	ITA; 3	**SPA**; Ret	**SPA**; 3	SPA; 3	POR; 2	POR; 1	POR; 2	**SPA**; 1	**SPA**; 1	SPA; 2	2nd	484
2025	Ducati	**AUS**; 1	**AUS**; 1	AUS; 1	POR; 2	POR; 2	POR; 2	NED; 1	NED; Ret	NED; Ret	**ITA**; 1	**ITA**; 1	ITA; 1	CZE; 2	CZE; 2	CZE; 1	**ITA**; 2	**ITA**; Ret	ITA; 2	GBR; 2	GBR; 2	GBR; 2	HUN; 2	HUN; 13	HUN; 2	FRA; 2	FRA; 2	FRA; 2	**SPA**; 2	**SPA**; 1	SPA; 1	POR; 2	POR; 2	POR; 1	**SPA**; 1	**SPA**; 1	SPA; 1	2nd	603
2026	Ducati	**AUS**; 1	**AUS**; 1	AUS; 1	**POR**; 1	**POR**; 1	POR; 1	**NED**; 1	**NED**; 1	NED; 1	**HUN**; 1	**HUN**; 1	HUN; 1	**CZE**; 1	**CZE**; 1	CZE; 1	**SPA**; 1	**SPA**; 1	SPA; 1	**ITA**; 1	**ITA**; 1	ITA; 1	**GBR**; 2	**GBR**; 1	GBR; 1	**FRA**; 1	**FRA**; 1	FRA; 1	ITA; 2	ITA; 2	ITA; 2	**POR**; 1	**POR**; 1	POR; 1	**SPA**; 1	**SPA**; 1	SPA; 1	1st	726

== Records ==
As of 18 October 2026, Bulega holds the following records:

WorldSBK

- First rider to win both the WorldSSP and WorldSBK World Championships
- Most consecutive race wins: 25 (Race 2 2025 Estoril Round–Race 2 2026 Emilia-Romagna Round)
- Most consecutive race wins from the start of a season: 21 (Race 1 2026 Australian Round–Race 2 2026 Emilia-Romagna Round)
- Most consecutive race wins in a single season: 21 (Race 1 2026 Australian Round–Race 2 2026 Emilia-Romagna Round)
- Most race wins in a single season: 32 (2026)
- Most consecutive podium finishes: 49 (Race 2 2025 Hungarian Round–Race 2 2026 Spanish Round)
- Most consecutive podium finishes from the start of a season: 36 (Race 1 2026 Australian Round–Race 2 2026 Spanish Round)
- Most consecutive podium finishes in a single season: 36 (Race 1 2026 Australian Round–Race 2 2026 Spanish Round)
- Most podium finishes in a single season: 36 (2026)
- Most consecutive poles: 10 (2025 Spanish Round–2026 French Round)
- Most consecutive poles from the start of a season: 9 (2026 Australian Round–2026 French Round)
- Most consecutive poles in a single season: 9 (2026 Australian Round–2026 French Round)
- Most poles in a single season: 11 (2026), (shared with Ben Spies)
- Most fastest laps in a single season: 31 (2026)
- Most consecutive points-scoring finishes: 49 (Race 2 2025 Hungarian Round–Race 2 2026 Spanish Round)
- Most points in a single season: 726 (2026)
- Most consecutive hat-tricks: 8 (2025 Spanish Round–2026 Emilia-Romagna Round)
- Most consecutive hat-tricks from the start of a season: 7 (2026 Australian Round–2026 Emilia-Romagna Round)
- Most consecutive hat-tricks in a single season: 7 (2026 Australian Round–2026 Emilia-Romagna Round)
- Most hat-tricks in a single season: 10 (2026)
- Most hat-tricks: 13 (2026)
- Most Grand Slams (winning the race from pole, leading every lap, and setting the fastest race lap) in a single season: 20 (2026)
- Most races led from start to finish in a single season: 21 (2026)
- Most laps led in a single season: 499 of 612 laps
