= Holeshot =

Motorsport terminology

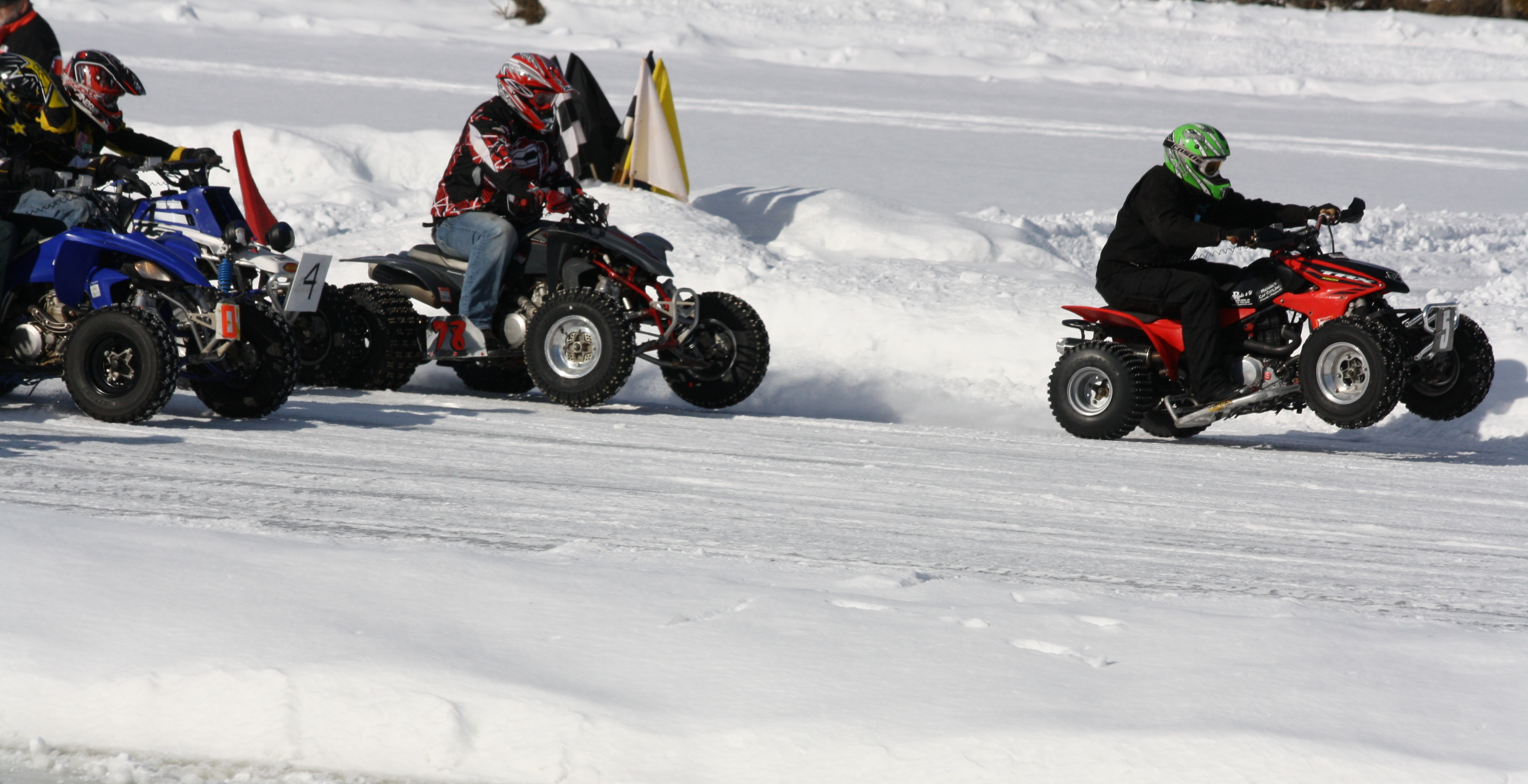
Holeshot in an ATV ice race

A holeshot is a term used in motorcycle racing to describe or reference the first racer to get through the apex of the first turn at the beginning of the race. Getting the holeshot gives the rider a competitive advantage and some level of control in the race, in some cases predicting the outcome of the race.

== History ==
The term is used in motorcycle racing, off-road racing (but also motorsport racing in general) for the rider who is the first one through the first turn. In some cases, a holeshot award is given, which is a prize separate from winning the race.

Many motorcycle racers consider the start to be the most important part of a race, and it is particularly important in those forms of the sport where the tracks are very small, tight and difficult to pass on. This is particularly relevant in motocross and supercross, where racers line up alongside each other rather than behind each other in tarmac-based sports. The term had also found its way into bicycle motocross racing (BMX) by the early 1970s because BMX is a bicycle derivative of motorcycle motocross and has inherited many terms from that sport. In BMX, the holeshot is even more important since BMX races are single lap 25 to 45 second races with only a few opportunities to pass in that time period. Achieving the holeshot in BMX will earn the rider a victory the majority of the time.

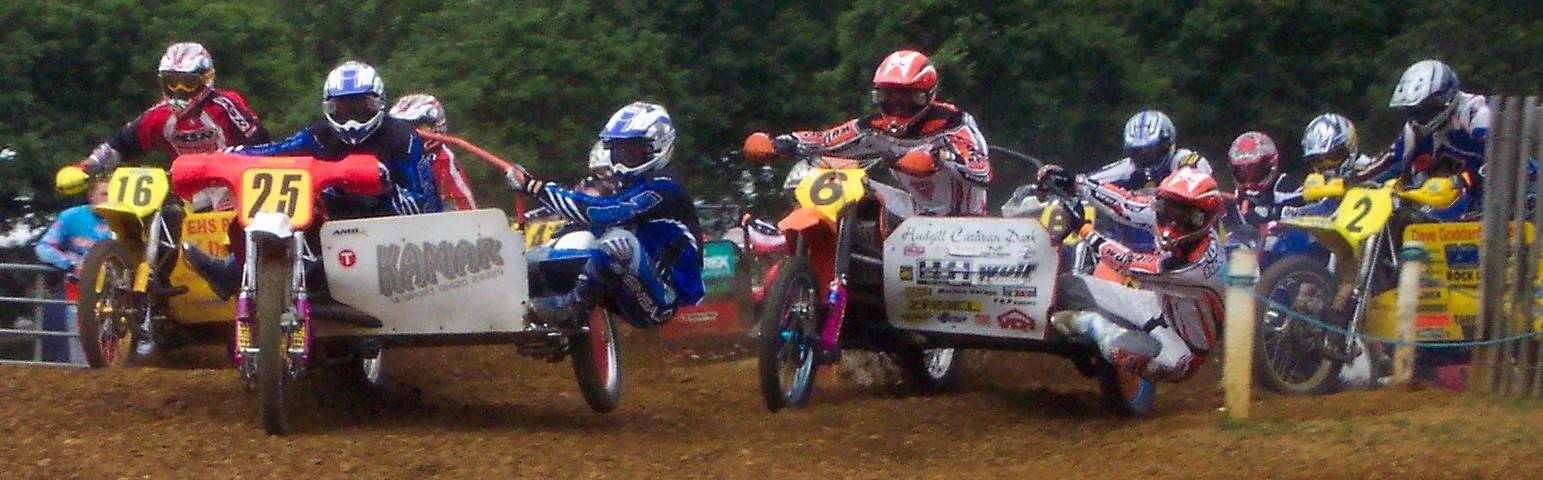
The holeshot of a sidecarcross race

This term can also be used to describe the starting performance of a vehicle. A vehicle that is fast off the line (though not necessarily fast overall) is said to have a good "holeshot".

A holeshot maneuver in off-road bicycle racing (mountain biking or cyclocross) is when a racer moves from the relatively flat, open area of the start to the narrower confines of the single track ahead of the other racers. A successful holeshot affords the first racer some control over the tempo of the race, as passing on the narrow single track can break the passing racer's rhythm.

=== Drag racing ===
In drag racing, a "holeshot win" refers to a victory in which a driver runs a slower elapsed time (E.T.) but wins the race due to a faster reaction time at the start.

=== MotoGP ===
Ducati pioneered the use of holeshot devices on their Desmosedici machine in MotoGP road racing in 2019. Evolving over the years to front and rear devices, the concept was quickly replicated by all other manufacturers, until the front devices were banned midseason in 2026 from the Assen TT, with the devices banned completely under the new general regulations for 2027, on grounds of riders' safety.
