= 2026 Superbike World Championship =

Motorsport championship

2026 Superbike World Championship
Previous:	2025	Next:	2027
Support series: Supersport World Championship; Sportbike World Championship; Women's Circuit Racing World Championship; Yamaha R3 bLU cRU FIM World Cup

The 2026 Superbike World Championship was the 39th season of the Superbike World Championship. This was the first season in 13 years without featuring the reigning Superbike World Champion as Toprak Razgatlıoğlu who had previously won the championship in 2025, is competing in MotoGP from 2026 onwards. Ducati successfully defended the constructors' championship, winning its 22nd constructors' championship and fifth in a row. The Aruba.it Racing - Ducati team also successfully defended the teams' championship, securing its fifth consecutive teams' championship.

The championship was won by Nicolò Bulega, who became World Champion in 2026 after finishing second in Race 2 at the Italian Round. He set records for the most wins in a single season, with 32, and the most consecutive race wins, with 25, from Race 2 at the 2025 Estoril Round to Race 2 at the 2026 Emilia-Romagna Round. He also recorded the most podium finishes in a single season, with 36, and the most consecutive podium finishes, with 49. He recorded the most pole positions in a single season, with 11, equalling Ben Spies's record set in 2009, as well as the most consecutive poles, with 10. He also recorded the highest number of fastest laps in a single season, with 31, and set a new record for the most points in a single season, with 726, surpassing Jonathan Rea's previous record of 663 points, set in 2019.

Iker Lecuona had already secured at least second place in the championship standings after winning Race 1 at the Italian Round but still retained a mathematical chance of winning the title. Despite adding wins in the Superpole Race and Race 2 to complete a hat-trick, Lecuona could not overtake Bulega in the championship standings and ultimately had to settle for the runner-up spot. He also set a record for the most second-place finishes in a single season, with 27, as well as a record for the most consecutive second-place finishes in a single season, with 18, from Race 1 at the Portuguese Round to Race 2 at the Emilia-Romagna Round.

The season was dominated by Ducati, which won all 36 races and secured all 12 pole positions, setting records for the most race wins and pole positions by a manufacturer in a single season. This marked the first time a manufacturer had won every race in a single season since Ducati achieved the same feat in 2003, winning all 24 races, and the first time a manufacturer had secured all pole positions in a single season since Ducati secured 13 pole positions in 1992. Ducati also recorded 40 consecutive race victories from Race 2 at the 2025 Estoril Round to Race 2 at the 2026 Spanish Round.

Aruba.it Racing - Ducati also won all 36 races and secured all 12 pole positions, setting records for the most race wins and pole positions by a team in a single season. The team also recorded 40 consecutive race victories over the same period. It set a record for the most 1–2 finishes in a single season, with 31, including 19 consecutive 1–2 finishes from Race 1 at the Portuguese Round to Race 1 at the United Kingdom Round.

2026 marked Pirelli's final season as the championship's official tyre supplier, bringing an end to its long-standing partnership that began in 2004. Michelin is set to take over as the championship's official tyre supplier from the 2027 season onwards.

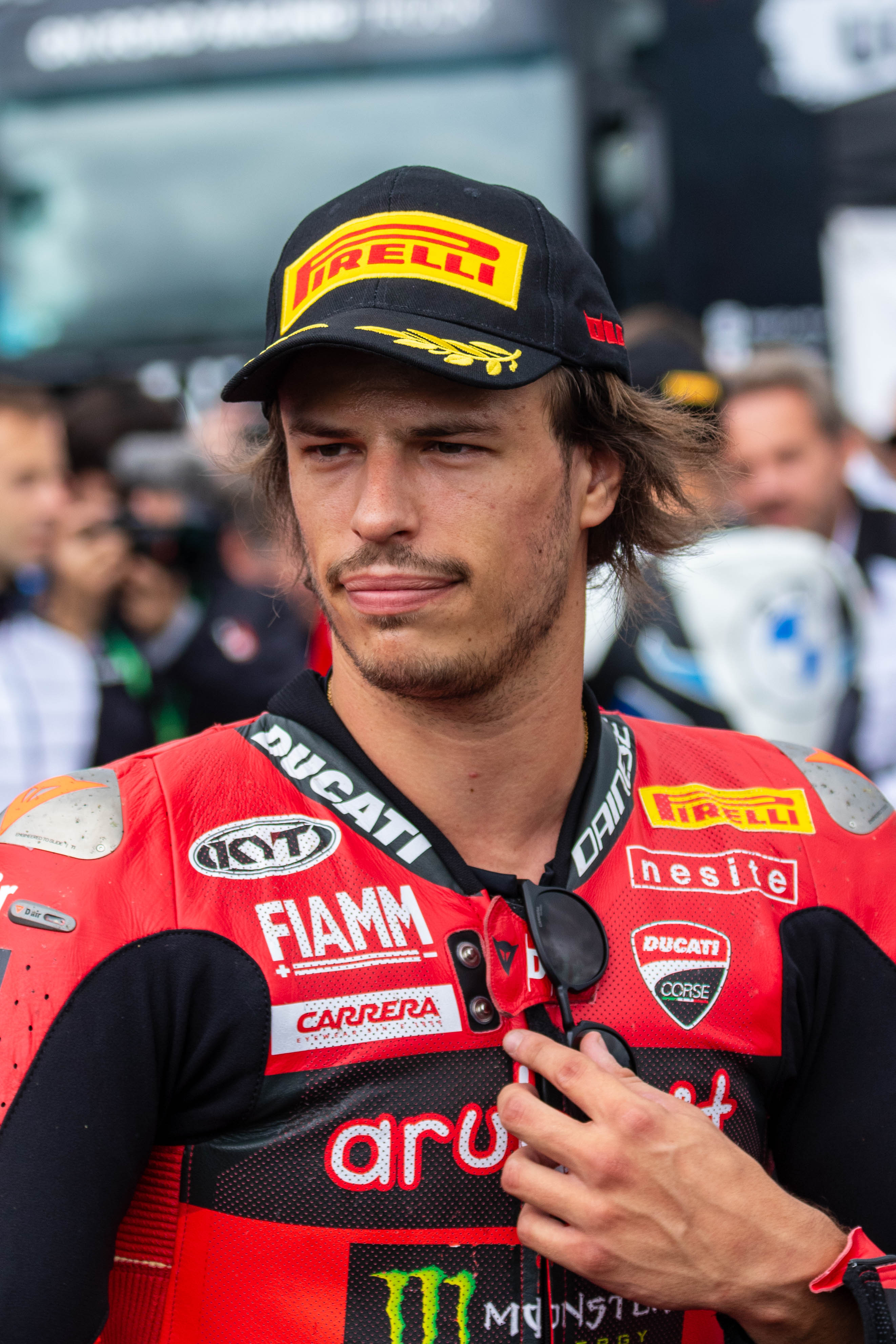
Nicolò Bulega (pictured in 2024) was the 2026 Superbike Champion. He won the championship after finishing runner-up in the previous two seasons.

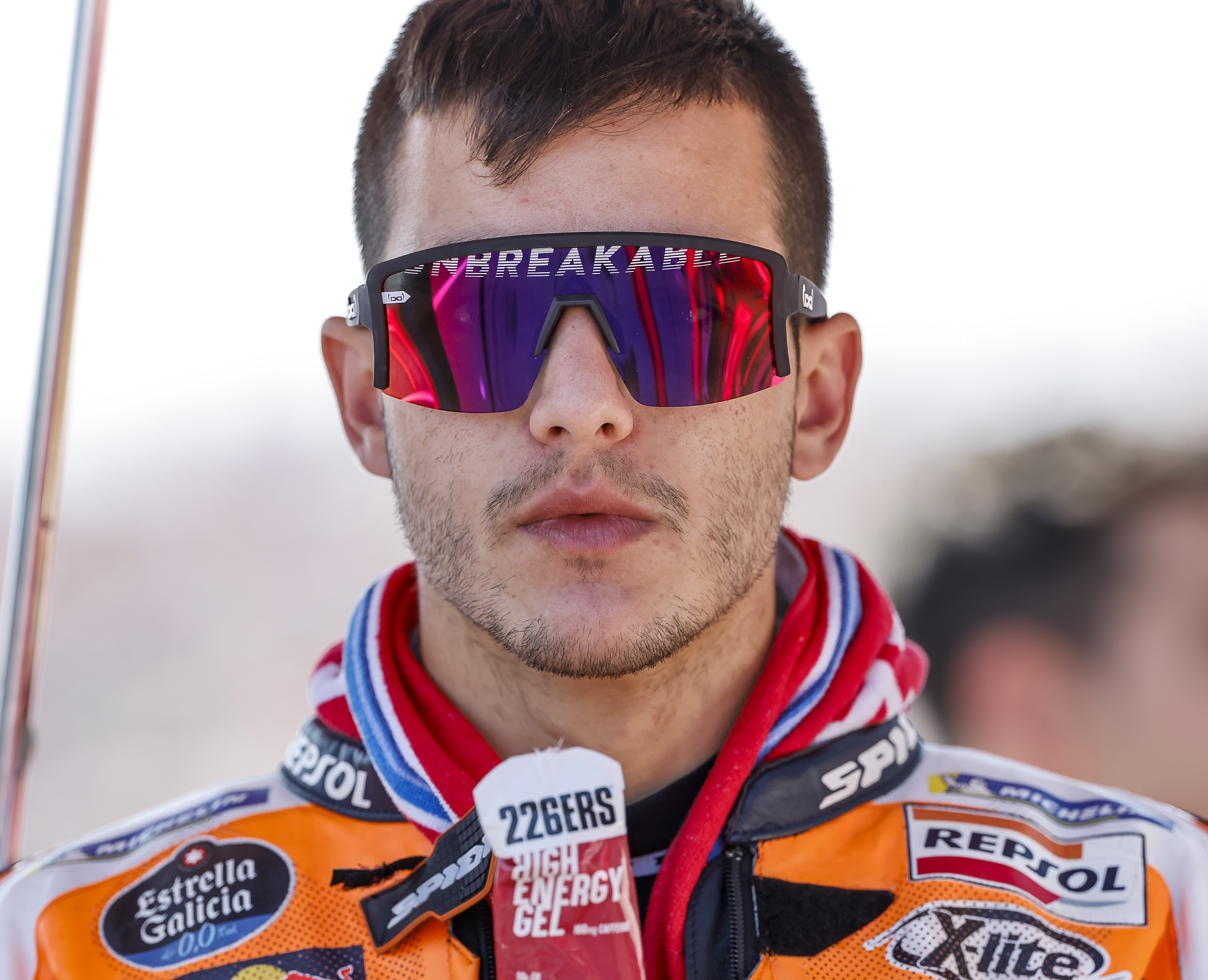
Iker Lecuona (pictured in 2023) finished runner-up. This was his best result in the Superbike World Championship.

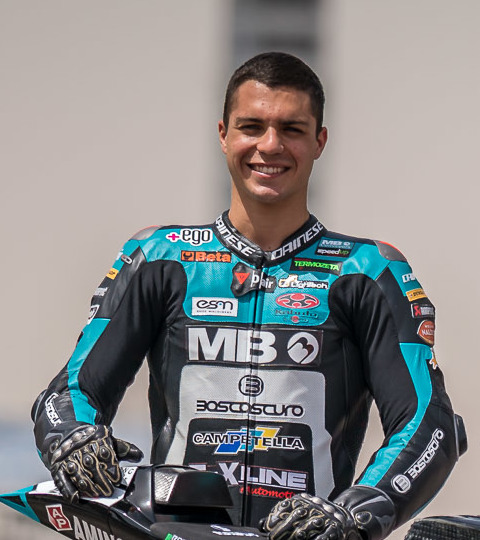
Yari Montella (pictured in 2021) finished third.

== Race calendar and results ==
The provisional 2026 season calendar was announced on 31 July 2025.

2026 Superbike World Championship Calendar
Round			Circuit	Date	Pole position	Fastest lap	Winning rider	Winning team	Winning constructor	Ref
1	R1	(Australia) Australian Round	Phillip Island Grand Prix Circuit	21 February	(Italy) Nicolò Bulega	(Italy) Nicolò Bulega	(Italy) Nicolò Bulega	(Italy) Aruba.it Racing - Ducati	(Italy) Ducati	
1	SR	(Australia) Australian Round	Phillip Island Grand Prix Circuit	22 February	(Italy) Nicolò Bulega	(Italy) Nicolò Bulega	(Italy) Nicolò Bulega	(Italy) Aruba.it Racing - Ducati	(Italy) Ducati	
1	R2	(Australia) Australian Round	Phillip Island Grand Prix Circuit	22 February		(Italy) Nicolò Bulega	(Italy) Nicolò Bulega	(Italy) Aruba.it Racing - Ducati	(Italy) Ducati	
2	R1	(Portugal) Portuguese Round	Algarve International Circuit	28 March	(Italy) Nicolò Bulega	(Italy) Nicolò Bulega	(Italy) Nicolò Bulega	(Italy) Aruba.it Racing - Ducati	(Italy) Ducati	
2	SR	(Portugal) Portuguese Round	Algarve International Circuit	29 March	(Italy) Nicolò Bulega	(Italy) Nicolò Bulega	(Italy) Nicolò Bulega	(Italy) Aruba.it Racing - Ducati	(Italy) Ducati	
2	R2	(Portugal) Portuguese Round	Algarve International Circuit	29 March		(Spain) Iker Lecuona	(Italy) Nicolò Bulega	(Italy) Aruba.it Racing - Ducati	(Italy) Ducati	
3	R1	(Netherlands) Dutch Round	TT Circuit Assen	18 April	(Italy) Nicolò Bulega	(Italy) Nicolò Bulega	(Italy) Nicolò Bulega	(Italy) Aruba.it Racing - Ducati	(Italy) Ducati	
3	SR	(Netherlands) Dutch Round	TT Circuit Assen	19 April	(Italy) Nicolò Bulega	(Italy) Nicolò Bulega	(Italy) Nicolò Bulega	(Italy) Aruba.it Racing - Ducati	(Italy) Ducati	
3	R2	(Netherlands) Dutch Round	TT Circuit Assen	19 April		(Italy) Nicolò Bulega	(Italy) Nicolò Bulega	(Italy) Aruba.it Racing - Ducati	(Italy) Ducati	
4	R1	(Hungary) Hungarian Round	Balaton Park Circuit	2 May	(Italy) Nicolò Bulega	(Italy) Nicolò Bulega	(Italy) Nicolò Bulega	(Italy) Aruba.it Racing - Ducati	(Italy) Ducati	
4	SR	(Hungary) Hungarian Round	Balaton Park Circuit	3 May	(Italy) Nicolò Bulega	(Italy) Nicolò Bulega	(Italy) Nicolò Bulega	(Italy) Aruba.it Racing - Ducati	(Italy) Ducati	
4	R2	(Hungary) Hungarian Round	Balaton Park Circuit	3 May		(Italy) Nicolò Bulega	(Italy) Nicolò Bulega	(Italy) Aruba.it Racing - Ducati	(Italy) Ducati	
5	R1	(Czech Republic) Czech Round	Autodrom Most	16 May	(Italy) Nicolò Bulega	(Spain) Iker Lecuona	(Italy) Nicolò Bulega	(Italy) Aruba.it Racing - Ducati	(Italy) Ducati	
5	SR	(Czech Republic) Czech Round	Autodrom Most	17 May	(Italy) Nicolò Bulega	(Italy) Nicolò Bulega	(Italy) Nicolò Bulega	(Italy) Aruba.it Racing - Ducati	(Italy) Ducati	
5	R2	(Czech Republic) Czech Round	Autodrom Most	17 May		(Italy) Nicolò Bulega	(Italy) Nicolò Bulega	(Italy) Aruba.it Racing - Ducati	(Italy) Ducati	
6	R1	(Spain) Aragon Round	MotorLand Aragón	30 May	(Italy) Nicolò Bulega	(Italy) Nicolò Bulega	(Italy) Nicolò Bulega	(Italy) Aruba.it Racing - Ducati	(Italy) Ducati	
6	SR	(Spain) Aragon Round	MotorLand Aragón	31 May	(Italy) Nicolò Bulega	(Italy) Nicolò Bulega	(Italy) Nicolò Bulega	(Italy) Aruba.it Racing - Ducati	(Italy) Ducati	
6	R2	(Spain) Aragon Round	MotorLand Aragón	31 May		(Italy) Nicolò Bulega	(Italy) Nicolò Bulega	(Italy) Aruba.it Racing - Ducati	(Italy) Ducati	
7	R1	(Italy) Emilia-Romagna Round	Misano World Circuit	13 June	(Italy) Nicolò Bulega	(Italy) Nicolò Bulega	(Italy) Nicolò Bulega	(Italy) Aruba.it Racing - Ducati	(Italy) Ducati	
7	SR	(Italy) Emilia-Romagna Round	Misano World Circuit	14 June	(Italy) Nicolò Bulega	(Italy) Nicolò Bulega	(Italy) Nicolò Bulega	(Italy) Aruba.it Racing - Ducati	(Italy) Ducati	
7	R2	(Italy) Emilia-Romagna Round	Misano World Circuit	14 June		(Italy) Nicolò Bulega	(Italy) Nicolò Bulega	(Italy) Aruba.it Racing - Ducati	(Italy) Ducati	
8	R1	(United Kingdom) UK Round	Donington Park	11 July	(Italy) Nicolò Bulega	(Italy) Nicolò Bulega	(Spain) Iker Lecuona	(Italy) Aruba.it Racing - Ducati	(Italy) Ducati	
8	SR	(United Kingdom) UK Round	Donington Park	12 July	(Italy) Nicolò Bulega	(United Kingdom) Sam Lowes	(Italy) Nicolò Bulega	(Italy) Aruba.it Racing - Ducati	(Italy) Ducati	
8	R2	(United Kingdom) UK Round	Donington Park	12 July		(Italy) Nicolò Bulega	(Italy) Nicolò Bulega	(Italy) Aruba.it Racing - Ducati	(Italy) Ducati	
9	R1	(France) French Round	Circuit de Nevers Magny-Cours	5 September	(Italy) Nicolò Bulega	(Italy) Nicolò Bulega	(Italy) Nicolò Bulega	(Italy) Aruba.it Racing - Ducati	(Italy) Ducati	
9	SR	(France) French Round	Circuit de Nevers Magny-Cours	6 September	(Italy) Nicolò Bulega	(Italy) Nicolò Bulega	(Italy) Nicolò Bulega	(Italy) Aruba.it Racing - Ducati	(Italy) Ducati	
9	R2	(France) French Round	Circuit de Nevers Magny-Cours	6 September		(Italy) Nicolò Bulega	(Italy) Nicolò Bulega	(Italy) Aruba.it Racing - Ducati	(Italy) Ducati	
10	R1	(Italy) Italian Round	Cremona Circuit	26 September	(Spain) Iker Lecuona	(Spain) Iker Lecuona	(Spain) Iker Lecuona	(Italy) Aruba.it Racing - Ducati	(Italy) Ducati	
10	SR	(Italy) Italian Round	Cremona Circuit	27 September	(Spain) Iker Lecuona	(Italy) Nicolò Bulega	(Spain) Iker Lecuona	(Italy) Aruba.it Racing - Ducati	(Italy) Ducati	
10	R2	(Italy) Italian Round	Cremona Circuit	27 September		(Spain) Iker Lecuona	(Spain) Iker Lecuona	(Italy) Aruba.it Racing - Ducati	(Italy) Ducati	
11	R1	(Portugal) Estoril Round	Circuito do Estoril	10 October	(Italy) Nicolò Bulega	(Italy) Nicolò Bulega	(Italy) Nicolò Bulega	(Italy) Aruba.it Racing - Ducati	(Italy) Ducati	
11	SR	(Portugal) Estoril Round	Circuito do Estoril	11 October	(Italy) Nicolò Bulega	(Italy) Nicolò Bulega	(Italy) Nicolò Bulega	(Italy) Aruba.it Racing - Ducati	(Italy) Ducati	
11	R2	(Portugal) Estoril Round	Circuito do Estoril	11 October		(Italy) Nicolò Bulega	(Italy) Nicolò Bulega	(Italy) Aruba.it Racing - Ducati	(Italy) Ducati	
12	R1	(Spain) Spanish Round	Circuito de Jerez	17 October	(Italy) Nicolò Bulega	(Italy) Nicolò Bulega	(Italy) Nicolò Bulega	(Italy) Aruba.it Racing - Ducati	(Italy) Ducati	
12	SR	(Spain) Spanish Round	Circuito de Jerez	18 October	(Italy) Nicolò Bulega	(Italy) Nicolò Bulega	(Italy) Nicolò Bulega	(Italy) Aruba.it Racing - Ducati	(Italy) Ducati	
12	R2	(Spain) Spanish Round	Circuito de Jerez	18 October		(Italy) Nicolò Bulega	(Italy) Nicolò Bulega	(Italy) Aruba.it Racing - Ducati	(Italy) Ducati	

== Entry list ==
2026 entry list
Team	Constructor	Motorcycle	No.	Rider	Rounds
(Italy) Bimota by Kawasaki Racing Team	Bimota	KB998	22	(United Kingdom) Alex Lowes	All
(Italy) Bimota by Kawasaki Racing Team	Bimota	KB998	47	(Italy) Axel Bassani	All
(Germany) ROKiT BMW Motorrad WorldSBK Team	BMW	M1000RR	9	(Italy) Danilo Petrucci	1–5, 8–12
(Germany) ROKiT BMW Motorrad WorldSBK Team	BMW	M1000RR	38	(Estonia) Hannes Soomer	6
(Germany) ROKiT BMW Motorrad WorldSBK Team	BMW	M1000RR	60	(Netherlands) Michael van der Mark	5–7
(Germany) ROKiT BMW Motorrad WorldSBK Team	BMW	M1000RR	88	(Portugal) Miguel Oliveira	1–4, 7–12
(Italy) Aruba.it Racing - Ducati	Ducati	Panigale V4R	7	(Spain) Iker Lecuona	All
(Italy) Aruba.it Racing - Ducati	Ducati	Panigale V4R	11	(Italy) Nicolò Bulega	All
(Italy) Barni Spark Racing Team	Ducati	Panigale V4R	5	(Italy) Yari Montella	All
(Italy) Barni Spark Racing Team	Ducati	Panigale V4R	19	(Spain) Álvaro Bautista	All
(Australia) Superbike Advocates	Ducati	Panigale V4R	46	(United Kingdom) Tommy Bridewell	2–12
(Belgium) ELF Marc VDS Racing Team	Ducati	Panigale V4R	14	(United Kingdom) Sam Lowes	All
(Germany) MGM Optical Express Racing	Ducati	Panigale V4R	76	(France) Loris Baz	10–12
(Germany) MGM Optical Express Racing	Ducati	Panigale V4R	95	(United Kingdom) Tarran Mackenzie	1–8
(Italy) Motocorsa Racing	Ducati	Panigale V4R	67	(Italy) Alberto Surra	All
(Italy) Team Goeleven	Ducati	Panigale V4R	34	(Italy) Lorenzo Baldassarri	All
(Japan) Honda HRC	Honda	CBR1000RR-R SP	17	(United Kingdom) Ryan Vickers	1
(Japan) Honda HRC	Honda	CBR1000RR-R SP	17	(United Kingdom) Ryan Vickers	7
(Japan) Honda HRC	Honda	CBR1000RR-R SP	35	(Thailand) Somkiat Chantra	2–12
(Japan) Honda HRC	Honda	CBR1000RR-R SP	45	(Japan) Tetsuta Nagashima	1
(Japan) Honda HRC	Honda	CBR1000RR-R SP	65	(United Kingdom) Jonathan Rea	2–3
(Japan) Honda HRC	Honda	CBR1000RR-R SP	65	(United Kingdom) Jonathan Rea	8
(Japan) Honda HRC	Honda	CBR1000RR-R SP	92	(Japan) Yuki Kunii	4–5
(Japan) Honda HRC	Honda	CBR1000RR-R SP	96	(United Kingdom) Jake Dixon	6, 8–12
(Italy) Kawasaki WorldSBK Team	Kawasaki	ZX-10RR	31	(United States) Garrett Gerloff	All
(Italy) GYTR GRT Yamaha WorldSBK Team	Yamaha	YZF-R1	62	(Italy) Stefano Manzi	All
(Italy) GYTR GRT Yamaha WorldSBK Team	Yamaha	YZF-R1	87	(Australia) Remy Gardner	All
(Japan) PATA Maxus Yamaha	Yamaha	YZF-R1	55	(Italy) Andrea Locatelli	All
(Japan) PATA Maxus Yamaha	Yamaha	YZF-R1	97	(Spain) Xavi Vierge	All
(Netherlands) Team Apreco	Yamaha	YZF-R1	85	(Netherlands) Twan Smits	3
(Italy) Motoxracing WorldSBK Team	Yamaha	YZF-R1	13	(Italy) Mattia Rato	All
(Italy) Motoxracing WorldSBK Team	Yamaha	YZF-R1	54	(Turkey) Bahattin Sofuoğlu	1–9
(Italy) Motoxracing WorldSBK Team	Yamaha	YZF-R1	85	(Netherlands) Twan Smits	10–12

Key
Regular rider
Wildcard rider
Replacement rider

=== Team changes ===
- Petronas MIE Racing Honda Team will leave the championship after six seasons.
- Superbike Advocates Racing will join the Superbike World Championship in the 2026 season with a Ducati bike and rider Tommy Bridewell.

=== Rider changes ===
- Somkiat Chantra (coming from MotoGP with LCR Honda) and Jake Dixon (coming from Moto2 with Marc VDS) make their World Superbike debut with Honda HRC, replacing Iker Lecuona and Xavi Vierge, who both move to Aruba.it Racing - Ducati and PATA Maxus Yamaha respectively, resulting in the following:
  - Álvaro Bautista joins Ducati's satellite team, Barni Spark Racing Team after leaving the official Ducati team at the end of 2025.
  - Jonathan Rea retires from full-time racing after the 2025 season. He was announced to become a test rider for Honda.
- Danilo Petrucci leaves Barni Spark Racing Team after three seasons to join ROKiT BMW Motorrad WorldSBK Team, replacing Michael van der Mark.
- Five-time MotoGP race winner Miguel Oliveira makes his World Superbike debut with ROKiT BMW Motorrad WorldSBK Team, replacing reigning World Champion Toprak Razgatlıoğlu, who replaces Oliveira at Prima Pramac Yamaha MotoGP.
- Mattia Rato makes his World Superbike debut with Yamaha Motoxracing WorldSBK Team, replacing Michael Ruben Rinaldi.
- Lorenzo Baldassarri makes his World Superbike return for the first time since 2023, joining Team Goeleven to replace Andrea Iannone, who leaves the team after two seasons. He tried to jumpstart his own team, Cainam Racing Team, who was in the provisional entry list, but then no other news came after that.
- Reigning Supersport World Champion Stefano Manzi makes his World Superbike debut with GYTR GRT Yamaha WorldSBK Team, replacing Dominique Aegerter, who returns to Supersport World Championship.
- Alberto Surra makes his World Superbike debut with Motocorsa Racing, replacing Ryan Vickers.
- Tarran Mackenzie remains with MGM Optical Express Racing after riding for the team as a replacement rider in the 2025 season, following Scott Redding's departure from World Superbike midway through the season.

== Championship standings ==
Points were awarded as follows:

Race 1 and Race 2

Position	**1st**	**2nd**	**3rd**	**4th**	**5th**	**6th**	**7th**	**8th**	**9th**	**10th**	**11th**	**12th**	**13th**	**14th**	**15th**
Points	25	20	16	13	11	10	9	8	7	6	5	4	3	2	1

Superpole Race

Position	**1st**	**2nd**	**3rd**	**4th**	**5th**	**6th**	**7th**	**8th**	**9th**
Points	12	9	7	6	5	4	3	2	1

=== Riders' championship ===
Pos.	Rider	Bike	PHI (Australia)			POR (Portugal)			ASS (Netherlands)			BAL (Hungary)			MOS (Czech Republic)			ARA (Spain)			MIS (Italy)			DON (United Kingdom)			MAG (France)			CRE (Italy)			EST (Portugal)			JER (Spain)			Pts.
Pos.	Rider	Bike	R1	SR	R2	R1	SR	R2	R1	SR	R2	R1	SR	R2	R1	SR	R2	R1	SR	R2	R1	SR	R2	R1	SR	R2	R1	SR	R2	R1	SR	R2	R1	SR	R2	R1	SR	R2	Pts.
1	(Italy) Nicolò Bulega	Ducati	**1**	**1**	1	**1**	**1**	1	**1**	**1**	1	**1**	**1**	1	**1**	**1**	1	**1**	**1**	1	**1**	**1**	1	**2**	**1**	1	**1**	**1**	1	2	2	2	**1**	**1**	1	**1**	**1**	1	726
2	(Spain) Iker Lecuona	Ducati	6	9	8	2	2	2	2	2	2	2	2	2	2	2	2	2	2	2	2	2	2	1	Ret	2	2	2	2	**1**	**1**	1	2	2	2	3	2	2	563
3	(Italy) Yari Montella	Ducati	2	4	Ret	16	6	NC	11	8	5	4	5	3	3	3	3	7	9	Ret	3	3	3	3	2	3	4	3	3	Ret	4	3	8	13	4	5	4	5	318
4	(United Kingdom) Sam Lowes	Ducati	5	5	Ret	5	5	5	3	3	3	9	20	6	Ret	17	12	3	3	3	Ret	Ret	10	4	3	7	3	Ret	11	3	5	Ret	11	10	15	2	3	3	268
5	(United Kingdom) Alex Lowes	Bimota	7	3	Ret	4	4	4	5	5	11	6	7	Ret	7	9	7	4	5	4	5	Ret	4	7	4	5	5	5	13	6	6	5	5	11	Ret	8	5	7	259
6	(Italy) Lorenzo Baldassarri	Ducati	3	8	9	11	10	6	8	13	6	Ret	3	4	6	4	4	6	Ret	Ret	Ret	5	15	6	6	8	6	7	4	4	Ret	7	6	9	6	7	7	6	236
7	(Italy) Axel Bassani	Bimota	4	2	2	8	8	8	12	18	13	17	15	Ret	5	13	8	8	6	5	4	4	Ret	9	5	4	7	11	9	8	16	9	7	6	5	10	12	8	222
8	(Italy) Alberto Surra	Ducati	9	12	12	15	15	Ret	15	12	17	8	6	7	9	5	6	14	4	8	6	7	6	WD	WD	WD	8	4	5	Ret	3	4	3	3	3	6	8	9	198
9	(Spain) Álvaro Bautista	Ducati	Ret	7	3	9	9	Ret	4	4	4	5	4	11	WD	WD	WD	Ret	8	7	9	12	Ret	14	11	10	14	15	6	10	Ret	Ret	9	5	Ret	4	6	4	167
10	(United States) Garrett Gerloff	Kawasaki	11	6	10	7	14	Ret	16	14	18	13	8	5	4	6	5	9	12	6	14	14	12	8	9	6	9	13	7	5	Ret	8	10	18	7	14	13	13	165
11	(Portugal) Miguel Oliveira	BMW	8	18	7	3	3	3	7	11	12	3	Ret	DNS							8	6	Ret	11	20	12	Ret	12	15	Ret	8	Ret	4	4	8	Ret	11	10	142
12	(Italy) Andrea Locatelli	Yamaha	13	14	5	12	11	9	6	9	8	7	13	Ret	8	11	9	Ret	Ret	13	7	8	7	13	12	11	12	10	Ret	7	10	10	16	Ret	Ret	13	20	16	121
13	(Spain) Xavi Vierge	Yamaha	Ret	DNS	Ret	6	7	14	10	6	7	10	10	12	12	Ret	11	13	10	Ret	12	Ret	11	10	8	9	10	9	8	Ret	12	Ret	13	7	9	Ret	9	12	113
14	(United Kingdom) Tommy Bridewell	Ducati				Ret	19	13	13	15	16	14	12	Ret	13	8	10	5	7	9	13	Ret	14	5	7	Ret	Ret	6	Ret	Ret	7	Ret	17	12	11	9	10	11	83
15	(United Kingdom) Tarran Mackenzie	Ducati	12	11	4	14	13	Ret	9	Ret	10	12	9	8	11	7	Ret	10	Ret	11	11	9	5	WD	WD	WD													81
16	(Australia) Remy Gardner	Yamaha	Ret	16	13	13	16	10	14	10	14	16	11	9	15	12	14	17	13	12	Ret	13	8	12	15	13	Ret	8	10	12	WD	WD	15	15	12	15	17	19	63
17	(Italy) Danilo Petrucci	BMW	10	10	6	10	12	7	18	7	9	11	16	DNS	Ret	WD	WD							15	19	15	13	16	12	14	11	12	18	16	16	17	19	20	61
18	(Italy) Stefano Manzi	Yamaha	Ret	13	14	17	17	11	19	16	15	15	14	10	10	14	15	12	14	14	10	10	16	16	13	16	Ret	18	Ret	11	Ret	11	22	14	14	18	14	17	46
19	(United Kingdom) Jake Dixon	Honda																16	WD	WD				18	17	17	11	14	Ret	9	9	6	12	8	10	11	15	15	41
20	(Netherlands) Michael van der Mark	BMW													14	10	13	11	11	10	Ret	11	9																23
21	(Thailand) Somkiat Chantra	Honda				18	Ret	15	WD	WD	WD	19	19	15	17	Ret	18	15	18	15	15	15	13	20	18	Ret	Ret	17	14	13	13	13	14	20	13	16	18	14	23
22	(Japan) Tetsuta Nagashima	Honda	14	17	11																																		7
23	(France) Loris Baz	Ducati																												15	15	14	19	17	Ret	12	16	18	7
24	(United Kingdom) Jonathan Rea	Honda				19	18	12	17	17	19													Ret	10	14													6
25	(Turkey) Bahattin Sofuoğlu	Yamaha	16	19	15	20	Ret	Ret	20	20	20	18	18	13	16	Ret	16	18	16	16	16	16	Ret	17	14	19	WD	WD	WD										4
26	(Italy) Mattia Rato	Yamaha	17	20	Ret	21	20	Ret	22	19	21	20	17	14	18	15	17	19	17	17	17	18	17	19	16	18	Ret	Ret	Ret	16	14	15	20	19	17	20	Ret	22	3
27	(United Kingdom) Ryan Vickers	Honda	15	15	Ret																Ret	17	18																1
28	(Estonia) Hannes Soomer	BMW																Ret	15	18																			0
29	(Netherlands) Twan Smits	Yamaha							21	21	22																			17	Ret	16	21	21	18	19	21	21	0
30	(Japan) Yuki Kunii	Honda										21	21	16	Ret	16	19																						0
Pos.	Rider	Bike	PHI (Australia)			POR (Portugal)			ASS (Netherlands)			BAL (Hungary)			MOS (Czech Republic)			ARA (Spain)			MIS (Italy)			DON (United Kingdom)			MAG (France)			CRE (Italy)			EST (Portugal)			JER (Spain)			Pts.

Colour	Result
Gold	Winner
Silver	Second place
Bronze	Third place
Green	Points classification
Blue	Non-points classification
Blue	Non-classified finish (NC)
Purple	Retired, not classified (Ret)
Red	Did not qualify (DNQ)
Red	Did not pre-qualify (DNPQ)
Black	Disqualified (DSQ)
White	Did not start (DNS)
White	Withdrew (WD)
White	Race cancelled (C)
Blank	Did not practice (DNP)
Blank	Did not arrive (DNA)
Blank	Excluded (EX)

**Bold** – Pole position
Italics – Fastest lap

=== Teams' championship ===
Pos.	Team	Bike No.	PHI (Australia)			POR (Portugal)			ASS (Netherlands)			BAL (Hungary)			MOS (Czech Republic)			ARA (Spain)			MIS (Italy)			DON (United Kingdom)			MAG (France)			CRE (Italy)			EST (Portugal)			JER (Spain)			Pts.
Pos.	Team	Bike No.	R1	SR	R2	R1	SR	R2	R1	SR	R2	R1	SR	R2	R1	SR	R2	R1	SR	R2	R1	SR	R2	R1	SR	R2	R1	SR	R2	R1	SR	R2	R1	SR	R2	R1	SR	R2	Pts.
1	(Italy) Aruba.it Racing - Ducati	7	6	9	8	2	2	2	2	2	2	2	2	2	2	2	2	2	2	2	2	2	2	1	Ret	2	2	2	2	**1**	**1**	1	2	2	2	3	2	2	1289
1	(Italy) Aruba.it Racing - Ducati	11	**1**	**1**	1	**1**	**1**	1	**1**	**1**	1	**1**	**1**	1	**1**	**1**	1	**1**	**1**	1	**1**	**1**	1	**2**	**1**	1	**1**	**1**	1	2	2	2	**1**	**1**	1	**1**	**1**	1	1289
2	(Italy) Barni Spark Racing Team	5	2	4	Ret	16	6	NC	11	8	5	4	5	3	3	3	3	7	9	Ret	3	3	3	3	2	3	4	3	3	Ret	4	3	8	13	4	5	4	5	485
2	(Italy) Barni Spark Racing Team	19	Ret	7	3	9	9	Ret	4	4	4	5	4	11	WD	WD	WD	Ret	8	7	9	12	Ret	14	11	10	14	15	6	10	Ret	Ret	9	5	Ret	4	6	4	485
3	(Italy) Bimota by Kawasaki Racing Team	22	7	3	Ret	4	4	4	5	5	11	6	7	Ret	7	9	7	4	5	4	5	Ret	4	7	4	5	5	5	13	6	6	5	5	11	Ret	8	5	7	481
3	(Italy) Bimota by Kawasaki Racing Team	47	4	2	2	8	8	8	12	18	13	17	15	Ret	5	13	8	8	6	5	4	4	Ret	9	5	4	7	11	9	8	16	9	7	6	5	10	12	8	481
4	(Belgium) ELF Marc VDS Racing Team	14	5	5	Ret	5	5	5	3	3	3	9	20	6	Ret	17	12	3	3	3	Ret	Ret	10	4	3	7	3	Ret	11	3	5	Ret	11	10	15	2	3	3	268
5	(Italy) Team Goeleven	34	3	8	9	11	10	6	8	13	6	Ret	3	4	6	4	4	6	Ret	Ret	Ret	5	15	6	6	8	6	7	4	4	Ret	7	6	9	6	7	7	6	236
6	(Japan) PATA Maxus Yamaha	55	13	14	5	12	11	9	6	9	8	7	13	Ret	8	11	9	Ret	Ret	13	7	8	7	13	12	11	12	10	Ret	7	10	10	16	Ret	Ret	13	20	16	234
6	(Japan) PATA Maxus Yamaha	97	Ret	DNS	Ret	6	7	14	10	6	7	10	10	12	12	Ret	11	13	10	Ret	12	Ret	11	10	8	9	10	9	8	Ret	12	Ret	13	7	9	Ret	9	12	234
7	(Germany) ROKiT BMW Motorrad WorldSBK Team	9	10	10	6	10	12	7	18	7	9	11	16	DNS	Ret	WD	WD							15	19	15	13	16	12	14	11	12	18	16	16	17	19	20	226
7	(Germany) ROKiT BMW Motorrad WorldSBK Team	38																Ret	15	18																			226
7	(Germany) ROKiT BMW Motorrad WorldSBK Team	60													14	10	13	11	11	10	Ret	11	9																226
7	(Germany) ROKiT BMW Motorrad WorldSBK Team	88	8	18	7	3	3	3	7	11	12	3	Ret	DNS							8	6	Ret	11	20	12	Ret	12	15	Ret	8	Ret	4	4	8	Ret	11	10	226
8	(Italy) Motocorsa Racing	67	9	12	12	15	15	Ret	15	12	17	8	6	7	9	5	6	14	4	8	6	7	6	WD	WD	WD	8	4	5	Ret	3	4	3	3	3	6	8	9	198
9	(Italy) Kawasaki WorldSBK Team	31	11	6	10	7	14	Ret	16	14	18	13	8	5	4	6	5	9	12	6	14	14	12	8	9	6	9	13	7	5	Ret	8	10	18	7	14	13	13	165
10	(Italy) GYTR GRT Yamaha WorldSBK Team	62	Ret	13	14	17	17	11	19	16	15	15	14	10	10	14	15	12	14	14	10	10	16	16	13	16	Ret	18	Ret	11	Ret	11	22	14	14	18	14	17	109
10	(Italy) GYTR GRT Yamaha WorldSBK Team	87	Ret	16	13	13	16	10	14	10	14	16	11	9	15	12	14	17	13	12	Ret	13	8	12	15	13	Ret	8	10	12	WD	WD	15	15	12	15	17	19	109
11	(Germany) MGM Optical Express Racing	76																												15	15	14	19	17	Ret	12	16	18	88
11	(Germany) MGM Optical Express Racing	95	12	11	4	14	13	Ret	9	Ret	10	12	9	8	11	7	Ret	10	Ret	11	11	9	5	WD	WD	WD													88
12	(Australia) Superbike Advocates	46				Ret	19	13	13	15	16	14	12	Ret	13	8	10	5	7	9	13	Ret	14	5	7	Ret	Ret	6	Ret	Ret	7	Ret	17	12	11	9	10	11	83
13	(Japan) Honda HRC	17	15	15	Ret																Ret	17	18																78
13	(Japan) Honda HRC	35				18	Ret	15	WD	WD	WD	19	19	15	17	Ret	18	15	18	15	15	15	13	20	18	Ret	Ret	17	14	13	13	13	14	20	13	16	18	14	78
13	(Japan) Honda HRC	45	14	17	11																																		78
13	(Japan) Honda HRC	65				19	18	12	17	17	19													Ret	10	14													78
13	(Japan) Honda HRC	92										21	21	16	Ret	16	19																						78
13	(Japan) Honda HRC	96																16	WD	WD				18	17	17	11	14	Ret	9	9	6	12	8	10	11	15	15	78
14	(Italy) Motoxracing WorldSBK Team	13	17	20	Ret	21	20	Ret	22	19	21	20	17	14	18	15	17	19	17	17	17	18	17	19	16	18	Ret	Ret	Ret	16	14	15	20	19	17	20	Ret	22	7
14	(Italy) Motoxracing WorldSBK Team	54	16	19	15	20	Ret	Ret	20	20	20	18	18	13	16	Ret	16	18	16	16	16	16	Ret	17	14	19	WD	WD	WD										7
14	(Italy) Motoxracing WorldSBK Team	85																												17	Ret	16	21	21	18	19	21	21	7
15	(Netherlands) Team Apreco	85							21	21	22																												0
Pos.	Team	Bike No.	PHI (Australia)			POR (Portugal)			ASS (Netherlands)			BAL (Hungary)			MOS (Czech Republic)			ARA (Spain)			MIS (Italy)			DON (United Kingdom)			MAG (France)			CRE (Italy)			EST (Portugal)			JER (Spain)			Pts.

=== Manufacturer's championship ===
Pos.	Manufacturer	PHI (Australia)			POR (Portugal)			ASS (Netherlands)			BAL (Hungary)			MOS (Czech Republic)			ARA (Spain)			MIS (Italy)			DON (United Kingdom)			MAG (France)			CRE (Italy)			EST (Portugal)			JER (Spain)			Pts.
Pos.	Manufacturer	R1	SR	R2	R1	SR	R2	R1	SR	R2	R1	SR	R2	R1	SR	R2	R1	SR	R2	R1	SR	R2	R1	SR	R2	R1	SR	R2	R1	SR	R2	R1	SR	R2	R1	SR	R2	Pts.
1	(Italy) Ducati	1	1	1	1	1	1	1	1	1	1	1	1	1	1	1	1	1	1	1	1	1	1	1	1	1	1	1	1	1	1	1	1	1	1	1	1	744
2	(Italy) Bimota	4	2	2	4	4	4	5	5	11	6	7	Ret	5	9	7	4	5	4	4	4	4	7	4	4	5	5	9	6	6	5	5	6	5	8	5	7	316
3	(Germany) BMW	8	10	6	3	3	3	7	7	9	3	16	DNS	14	10	13	11	11	10	8	6	9	11	19	12	13	12	12	14	8	12	4	4	8	17	11	10	184
4	(Japan) Yamaha	13	13	5	6	7	9	6	6	7	7	10	9	8	11	9	12	10	12	7	8	7	10	8	9	10	8	8	7	10	10	13	7	9	13	9	12	183
5	(Japan) Kawasaki	11	6	10	7	14	Ret	16	14	18	13	8	5	4	6	5	9	12	6	14	14	12	8	9	6	9	13	7	5	Ret	8	10	18	7	14	13	13	165
6	(Japan) Honda	14	15	11	18	18	12	17	17	19	19	19	15	17	16	18	15	18	15	15	15	13	18	10	14	11	14	14	9	9	6	12	8	10	11	15	14	64
Pos.	Manufacturer	PHI (Australia)			POR (Portugal)			ASS (Netherlands)			BAL (Hungary)			MOS (Czech Republic)			ARA (Spain)			MIS (Italy)			DON (United Kingdom)			MAG (France)			CRE (Italy)			EST (Portugal)			JER (Spain)			Pts.
