= 2015 Asia Road Racing Championship =

20th season Asia Road Racing Championship

2015 Asia Road Racing Championship
Previous:	2014	Next:	2016

The 2015 FIM Asia Road Racing Championship was the 20th season of the Asia Road Racing Championship. The Season started on 18 April at Sepang International Circuit in Malaysia and ended on 6 December at Chang International Circuit in Thailand.

== Calendar and results ==
Round	Circuit	Date	SS600 Winners	AP250 Winners	UB150 Winners	Asia Dream Cup Winners	Suzuki Asian Challenge Winners
1	(Malaysia) Sepang International Circuit	18–19 April	R1: (Japan) Yuki Takahashi	R1: (Japan) Takehiro Yamamoto	R1: (Malaysia) Ahmad Fazli Sham	R1: (Japan) Hiroki Nakamura	R1: (Thailand) Patis Chooprathet
1	(Malaysia) Sepang International Circuit	18–19 April	R2: (Malaysia) Zamri Baba	R2: (Thailand) Apiwat Wongthananon	R2: (Malaysia) Muhaimin Roslan	R2: (Thailand) Muklada Sarapuech	R2: (Indonesia) Andreas Gunawan
2	(Indonesia) Sentul International Circuit	6–7 June	R1: (Indonesia) Ahmad Yudhistira	R1: Race Cancelled (Note: Race 1 of Round 2, FIM ASIA ROAD RACING CHAMPIONSHIP at Sentul International Circuit is cancelled due to oil Spillage at turn 4, no points were awarded.)	R1: (Malaysia) Norizman Ismail	R1: (Thailand) Muklada Sarapuech	R1: (India) Jagan Kumar
2	(Indonesia) Sentul International Circuit	6–7 June	R2: (Indonesia) Fadli Immammuddin	R2: (Thailand) Apiwat Wongthananon	R2: (Indonesia) Gupita Kresna	R2: (Japan) Yusuke Nakamura	R2: (Thailand) Patis Chooprathet
3	(Japan) Suzuka Circuit	4–5 June	R1: (Japan) Yuki Ito	R1: (Japan) Takehiro Yamamoto	R1: (Malaysia) Norizman Ismail	R1: (Thailand) Muklada Sarapuech	R1: (Indonesia) Andreas Gunawan
3	(Japan) Suzuka Circuit	4–5 June	R2: (Japan) Yuki Takahashi	R2: (Japan) Takehiro Yamamoto	R2: (Indonesia) Ferlando Herdian	R2: (Japan) Hiroki Nakamura (Japan) Yusuke Nakamura	R2: (Japan) Takeru Murase
4	(Thailand) Chang International Circuit	29–30 August	R1: (Japan) Yuki Takahashi	R1: (Thailand) Nakarin Atiratphuvapat	R1: (Indonesia) Gupita Kresna	R1: (Thailand) Muklada Sarapuech	R1: (Indonesia) Andreas Gunawan
4	(Thailand) Chang International Circuit	29–30 August	R2: (Japan) Yuki Takahashi	R2: (Thailand) Nakarin Atiratphuvapat	R2: (Malaysia) Norizman Ismail	R2: (Japan) Hiroki Nakamura	R2: (Japan) Takeru Murase
5	(Qatar) Losail International Circuit	2–3 October	R1: (Japan) Yuki Takahashi	R1: (Japan) Takehiro Yamamoto	R1: (Malaysia) Amirul Ariff Musa	R1: (Thailand) Muklada Sarapuech	Did Not Participate
5	(Qatar) Losail International Circuit	2–3 October	R2: (Japan) Yuki Takahashi	R2: (Japan) Takehiro Yamamoto	R2: (Malaysia) Ahmad Fazrul Sham	R2: (Japan) Muklada Sarapuech	Did Not Participate
6	(Thailand) Chang International Circuit	5–6 December	R1: (Japan) Yuki Takahashi	R1: (Thailand) Nakarin Atiratphuvapat	R1: (Malaysia) Adib Rosley	R1: (Japan) Hiroki Nakamura	R1: (Indonesia) Dedi Kurniawan
6	(Thailand) Chang International Circuit	5–6 December	R2: (Japan) Yuki Takahashi	R2: (Thailand) Nakarin Atiratphuvapat	R2: (Indonesia) Anggi Permana Putra	R2: (Australia) Broc Pearson	R2: (Malaysia) Nazirul Izzat

Footnotes;

== Team and riders ==
=== Supersport 600 ===
SS600 Entry List
Team	Constructor	No.	Rider	Rounds
MUSASHI Boon Siew Honda Racing	Honda	1	(Malaysia) Zaqhwan Zaidi	4–6
MUSASHI Boon Siew Honda Racing	Honda	52	(Malaysia) Zamri Baba	1–2
MUSASHI Boon Siew Honda Racing	Honda	72	(Japan) Yuki Takahashi	All
Astra Honda Racing Team	Honda	20	(Indonesia) Dimas Ekky Pratama	All
Astra Honda Racing Team	Honda	27	(Indonesia) Andi Farid Izdihar	4–6
Astra Honda Racing Team	Honda	43	(Indonesia) Fadli Immammuddin	1–2
Hamamatsu ESCARGOT	Honda	36	(Japan) Atsushi Kawaguchi	3
Teluru & Kohara RT	Honda	39	(Japan) Hikari Okubo	3
AP Honda Racing Thailand	Honda	59	(Thailand) Ratthapong Wilairot	All
AP Honda Racing Thailand	Honda	91	(Thailand) Jakkrit Sawangswat	1–2, 4–6
AP Honda Racing Thailand	Honda	100	(Thailand) Thitipong Warokorn	6
T.Pro Yuzy Honda NTS	Honda	39	(Japan) Hikari Okubo	6
T.Pro Yuzy Honda NTS	Honda	71	(Japan) Tomoyoshi Koyama	All
T.Pro Yuzy Honda NTS	Honda	86	(Malaysia) Akmal Hisyam	All
T.Pro Yuzy Honda NTS	Honda	93	(Japan) Taiga Hada	1–5
Thai Honda Thailand	Honda	79	(Thailand) Pongpeera Khaknakhup	All
Thai Honda Thailand	Honda	82	(Thailand) Suhathai Chaemsup	All
Honda Wahana Dunia Motor	Honda	81	(Indonesia) Dwi Satria	2
BikeART Racing Kawasaki	Kawasaki	23	(Malaysia) Hazlanshah Md Noor	All
BikeART Racing Kawasaki	Kawasaki	32	(Japan) Mitsunori Okamura	All
BikeART Racing Kawasaki	Kawasaki	86	(Malaysia) Farid Badrul Hisham	All
Manual Tech KYT Kawasaki	Kawasaki	28	(Indonesia) Mohammad Reihan	2
Manual Tech KYT Kawasaki	Kawasaki	33	(Indonesia) Ahmad Yudhistira	All
Manual Tech KYT Kawasaki	Kawasaki	55	(Thailand) Aekkachai Chiengwong	All
Saudi Faicons	Kawasaki	88	(Saudi Arabia) Abdul Aziz Baker	5
Team Kagayama Suzuki ASIA	Suzuki	25	(Indonesia) Rafid Topan Sucipto	All
Team Kagayama Suzuki ASIA	Suzuki	41	(Japan) Noriyuki Haga	All
Hamamatsu Team Titan	Suzuki	73	(Japan) Yohei Iganami	3
Petronas Hong Leong Yamaha	Yamaha	12	(Malaysia) Fitri Ashraff Razali	All
Petronas Hong Leong Yamaha	Yamaha	50	(Malaysia) Ahmad Afiff Amran	1–5
Petronas Hong Leong Yamaha	Yamaha	76	(Japan) Yuki Ito	All
Yamaha Thailand Racing	Yamaha	14	(Thailand) Anucha Nakcharoensri	3–4, 6
Yamaha Thailand Racing	Yamaha	30	(Thailand) Anupab Sarmoon	1, 3–4
Yamaha Thailand Racing	Yamaha	35	(Thailand) Ratthapong Boonlert	1
Yamaha Thailand Racing	Yamaha	46	(Thailand) Decha Kraisart	6
Yamaha Thailand Racing	Yamaha	62	(Japan) Ryuji Yokoe	6
Yamaha Thailand Racing	Yamaha	65	(Thailand) Chalermpol Polamai	6
Yellowcorn Akeno Speed Racing	Yamaha	18	(Japan) Makoto Inagaki	All
Yellowcorn Akeno Speed Racing	Yamaha	19	(Australia) Mark Aitchison	2–4
Yellowcorn Akeno Speed Racing	Yamaha	22	(Japan) Okuno Tsubasa	3
Finson Motorsports Australia	Yamaha	19	(Australia) Mark Aitchison	1
Finson Motorsports Australia	Yamaha	64	(Australia) Aaron Morris	1–2, 4–5
Finson Motorsports Australia	Yamaha	75	(Australia) Callum Spriggs	1–5
Finson Motorsports Australia	Yamaha	78	(Australia) Michael Blair	1–5
Yoichi Chunetsu Racing	Yamaha	21	(Japan) Yoichi Hosono	2
QMMF Racing Team	Yamaha	117	(Qatar) Essa Mohamed Al-Mutuwa	5

Key
Regular rider
Wildcard rider
Replacement rider

==== Asia Production 250 ====
AP250 Entry List
Team	Constructor	No.	Rider	Rounds
Faito Factory Racing	Honda	17	(Japan) Masaharu Ono	1–4
AP Honda Racing Thailand	Honda	18	(Thailand) Somkiat Chantra	6
AP Honda Racing Thailand	Honda	24	(Thailand) Apiwat Wongthananon	All
AP Honda Racing Thailand	Honda	41	(Thailand) Nakarin Atiratphuvapat	All
AP Honda Racing Thailand	Honda	46	(Thailand) Vorapong Malahuan	All
AP Honda Racing Thailand	Honda	145	(Thailand) Sitthisak Onchawiang	4, 6
T.Pro Yuzy Honda NTS	Honda	20	(Malaysia) Azroy Anuar	4–6
T.Pro Yuzy Honda NTS	Honda	35	(Japan) Karen Ogura	3
T.Pro Yuzy Honda NTS	Honda	63	(Malaysia) Amirul Ariff Musa	1–3
NJT Racing Team + SRS-J	Honda	62	(Japan) Yuto Sano	3–4
NJT Racing Team + SRS-J	Honda	81	(Japan) Katsuto Sano	3–4
	Honda	76	(Malaysia) Luth Harith Erwan	1
NJT IRC Honda Racing	Honda	123	(Thailand) Passawit Thitivararak	6
Sommai Junchai Team	Honda	135	(Thailand) Kritchaporn Kaewsonthi	6
TRICKSTAR Racing	Kawasaki	11	(Japan) Takehiro Yamamoto	All
TRICKSTAR Racing	Kawasaki	12	(Japan) Ryunosuke Hyodo	All
TRICKSTAR Racing	Kawasaki	15	(Japan) Ruka Wada	3
FELDA PB Racing	Kawasaki	22	(Malaysia) Fairuz Nasir	1–3
FELDA PB Racing	Kawasaki	66	(Malaysia) Saiful Izman Zamani	4–6
BikeART Racing Kawasaki	Kawasaki	92	(Malaysia) Muzakkir Mohamed	2–6
BikeART Racing Kawasaki	Kawasaki	95	(Malaysia) Siti Norafizah	1
Manual Tech KYT Rextor	Kawasaki	108	(Indonesia) Andy Muhammad Fadly	All
Yamaha Thailand Racing Team	Yamaha	14	(Thailand) Peerapong Loiboonpeng	All
Yamaha Thailand Racing Team	Yamaha	44	(Thailand) Ratthapong Boonlert	4, 6
Yamaha Thailand Racing Team	Yamaha	45	(Thailand) Peerapong Boonlert	All
Yamaha Thailand Racing Team	Yamaha	500	(Thailand) Anupab Sarmoon	6
Yamaha Finson Racing	Yamaha	21	(Australia) Brandon Paul Demmery	All
Yamaha Finson Racing	Yamaha	127	(Malaysia) Kasma Daniel	All
Team One For All With Run Riding School	Yamaha	23	(Japan) Daiki Uehara	6
Team One For All With Run Riding School	Yamaha	410	(Japan) Katsuki Satori	1–4
Team One For All With Run Riding School	Yamaha	750	(Japan) Naoko Takasugi	3
Team One For All With Run Riding School	Yamaha	750	(Japan) Naoko Takasugi	4–6
Team One For All With Run Riding School	Yamaha	990	(Japan) Reina Shiraishi	1–3
Yamaha MLT Racing Team	Yamaha	26	(China) Li Zheng Pang	All
Yamaha MLT Racing Team	Yamaha	28	(China) Meng Xing Bin	All
Yamaha Yamalube KYT Tunggal Jaya Racing	Yamaha	27	(Indonesia) Rusman Fadhil	All
Yamaha Yamalube KYT Tunggal Jaya Racing	Yamaha	32	(Indonesia) Hasyim Zaki Adil	All
Yamaha Yamalube KYT Tunggal Jaya Racing	Yamaha	50	(Indonesia) Wilman Hammar	2
Yamaha Yamalube KYT Tunggal Jaya Racing	Yamaha	202	(Indonesia) Syarif Alkadrie	2
ITO Racing	Yamaha	30	(Japan) Ryuya Maeda	3
Yamaha Factory Racing Indonesia	Yamaha	34	(Indonesia) Imanuel Putra Pratna	All
Yamaha Factory Racing Indonesia	Yamaha	99	(Indonesia) Galang Hendra Pratama	All
Yamaha Factory Racing Indonesia	Yamaha	222	(Indonesia) Reynaldo Ratukore	3
Yamaha Factory Racing Indonesia	Yamaha	630	(Indonesia) Sigit Purno Harjono	All
Team YSK Korea	Yamaha	52	(South Korea) Lim Hogon	All
Team YSK Korea	Yamaha	88	(South Korea) Baik Minseok	All
Yamaha K-Sport Yamalube Y-TEQ	Yamaha	59	(Thailand) Akkarak Tesang	6
Yamaha Nissin BRT HRP	Yamaha	67	(Indonesia) Hendriansyah	2
Yamaha Nissin KYT FDR Ardians	Yamaha	75	(Indonesia) Irfan Ardiansyah	2
Akeno Speed Racing	Yamaha	82	(Japan) Ayumu Tanaka	All
BKMS Indonesia Racing Team	Yamaha	91	(Indonesia) Iman Micko Eryandi	All
Faito Factory Racing	Yamaha	93	(Indonesia) Fitriansyah Kete	1–2
RCB Yamaha YYPang Racing Team	Yamaha	98	(Malaysia) Izzat Zaidi	All
Yamaha DS Moto	Yamaha	195	(Indonesia) Alshad Ahmad	2

Key
Regular rider
Wildcard rider
Replacement rider

==== Underbone 130 ====
UB130 Entry List
Team	Constructor	No.	Rider	Rounds
Harian Metro Y-TEQ SCK Honda	Honda	16	(Malaysia) Elly Illias	All
Harian Metro Y-TEQ SCK Honda	Honda	19	(Malaysia) Norizman Ismail	All
T.Pro Yuzy Honda NTS	Honda	21	(Malaysia) Sasitharen Sukumaran	All
T.Pro Yuzy Honda NTS	Honda	25	(Malaysia) Rozaiman Said	1–3, 6
T.Pro Yuzy Honda NTS	Honda	63	(Malaysia) Amirul Ariff Musa	4–5
T.Pro Yuzy Honda NTS	Honda	70	(Japan) Naoki Takahashi	All
Honda Kawahara Racing IRC KYT	Honda	34	(Indonesia) Wahyu Widodo	2
Manual Tech KYT Rextor	Kawasaki	23	(Indonesia) Gupita Kresna	All
R7 KYT AHRS SSS Racing Tech	Yamaha	11	(Indonesia) Rendy Yusri	1–2
R7 KYT AHRS SSS Racing Tech	Yamaha	12	(Indonesia) Hadi Wijaya	2
R7 KYT AHRS SSS Racing Tech	Yamaha	57	(Indonesia) Hokky Krisdianto	1–2
BKMS Indonesia Racing Team	Yamaha	17	(Indonesia) Maulana Noor Khairi	2–3, 5–6
BKMS Indonesia Racing Team	Yamaha	61	(Indonesia) Ferlando Herdian	All
BKMS Indonesia Racing Team	Yamaha	92	(Indonesia) Florianus Roy	All
RCB Yamaha YYPang Racing	Yamaha	18	(Malaysia) Adib Rosley	All
RCB Yamaha YYPang Racing	Yamaha	28	(Malaysia) Azhar Jalil	All
HORSE OIL William Racing Team	Yamaha	33	(Malaysia) Ahmad Fazrul Sham	All
PETRONAS Hong Leong Yamaha	Yamaha	36	(Malaysia) Affendi Rosli	All
PETRONAS Hong Leong Yamaha	Yamaha	46	(Malaysia) Azam Omar	2–6
PETRONAS Hong Leong Yamaha	Yamaha	50	(Malaysia) Ahmad Syukran Aizat	1
FELDA PB Racing	Yamaha	44	(Malaysia) Khairil Hisham	4–6
FELDA PB Racing	Yamaha	66	(Malaysia) Saiful Izman Zamani	1–3
FELDA PB Racing	Yamaha	99	(Malaysia) Fareez Afeez	All
Faito Factory Racing	Yamaha	60	(Indonesia) Wahyu Aji Trilaksana	2–6
Faito Factory Racing	Yamaha	77	(Indonesia) Iswandi Muis	1
Faito Factory Racing	Yamaha	158	(Indonesia) Anggi Permana Putra	All
RPM Racing	Yamaha	75	(Indonesia) Reza Fahlevy	All
Yamaha Yamalube NHK Bahtera RT	Yamaha	95	(Indonesia) Sulung Giwa Husna	2
PETRONAS Yamaha Maju Motor	Yamaha	96	(Malaysia) Muhaimin Roslan	1
PETRONAS Yamaha Maju Motor	Yamaha	146	(Malaysia) Ahmad Fazli Sham	1
Yamaha YSS NHK Sakura Yonk Jaya	Yamaha	179	(Indonesia) Richard Taroreh	2

Key
Regular rider
Wildcard rider
Replacement rider

==== Asia Dream Cup ====
Asia Dream Cup Entry List
Constructor	Bike	No.	Rider	Rounds
Honda	Honda CBR250RR	1	(Japan) Hiroki Nakamura	All
Honda	Honda CBR250RR	2	(Malaysia) Hafiz Nor Azman	All
Honda	Honda CBR250RR	3	(Philippines) Masaharu Tadachi	All
Honda	Honda CBR250RR	4	(Singapore) Arsyad Rusydi	All
Honda	Honda CBR250RR	5	(China) Zhou Sheng Jun Jie	All
Honda	Honda CBR250RR	6	(India) Sarath Kumar	All
Honda	Honda CBR250RR	7	(Japan) Yusuke Nakamura	All
Honda	Honda CBR250RR	8	(Malaysia) Saiful Azhary	1–5
Honda	Honda CBR250RR	9	(Indonesia) Dio Syahputra	All
Honda	Honda CBR250RR	10	(Indonesia) Muhammad Febriansyah	All
Honda	Honda CBR250RR	11	(Singapore) Hasroy Osman	All
Honda	Honda CBR250RR	12	(Philippines) Robert Ramos	All
Honda	Honda CBR250RR	13	(Australia) Broc Pearson	All
Honda	Honda CBR250RR	14	(Sri Lanka) Jaden Gunawardena	1–3, 5–6
Honda	Honda CBR250RR	15	(India) Hari Krishnan	All
Honda	Honda CBR250RR	16	(India) Sethu Rajiv	All
Honda	Honda CBR250RR	17	(Thailand) Worapod Niamsakhonsakul	All
Honda	Honda CBR250RR	18	(Thailand) Muklada Sarapuech	All
Honda	Honda CBR250RR	19	(Chinese Taipei) Lee Yen Ching	All
Honda	Honda CBR250RR	20	(Qatar) Abdulla Naieef Al-Qubaisi	5
Honda	Honda CBR250RR	21	(Vietnam) Bui Duy Thong	6

==== Suzuki Asian Challenge ====
UB130 Entry List
Constructor	Bike	No.	Rider	Rounds
Suzuki	Suzuki Satria FU150	16	(Singapore) Jazil Juraimi	1–4, 6
Suzuki	Suzuki Satria FU150	24	(Philippines) Lorenzo Rellosa III	1–4, 6
Suzuki	Suzuki Satria FU150	29	(Philippines) Mario Borbon Jr	1–4, 6
Suzuki	Suzuki Satria FU150	31	(Malaysia) Zulhilmi Yazid	1–4, 6
Suzuki	Suzuki Satria FU150	33	(India) Jagan Kumar	1–4, 6
Suzuki	Suzuki Satria FU150	39	(Vietnam) Nguyen Hoang Anh Dung	1–4, 6
Suzuki	Suzuki Satria FU150	41	(India) Mithun Kumar	1–4, 6
Suzuki	Suzuki Satria FU150	43	(Indonesia) Andreas Gunawan	1–4, 6
Suzuki	Suzuki Satria FU150	45	(Singapore) Aiman Nabil	1–4, 6
Suzuki	Suzuki Satria FU150	46	(Philippines) April King Mascardo	1–4, 6
Suzuki	Suzuki Satria FU150	55	(Indonesia) Dedi Kurniawan	1–4, 6
Suzuki	Suzuki Satria FU150	71	(Japan) Kai Saito	1–4, 6
Suzuki	Suzuki Satria FU150	83	(Japan) Takeru Murase	1–4, 6
Suzuki	Suzuki Satria FU150	88	(Malaysia) Nazirul Izzat Bahauddin	1–4, 6
Suzuki	Suzuki Satria FU150	93	(Sri Lanka) Basith Bakir	1–4, 6
Suzuki	Suzuki Satria FU150	98	(Thailand) Patis Chooprathet	1–4, 6
Suzuki	Suzuki Satria FU150	99	(Indonesia) Adhi Chandra	1–4, 6

== Championship standings ==
Points

Position	**1st**	**2nd**	**3rd**	**4th**	**5th**	**6th**	**7th**	**8th**	**9th**	**10th**	**11th**	**12th**	**13th**	**14th**	**15th**
Points	25	20	16	13	11	10	9	8	7	6	5	4	3	2	1

=== Riders standings ===
==== Supersport 600 ====
Pos.	Rider	Bike	SEP (Malaysia)		SEN (Indonesia)		SUZ (Japan)		BUR (Thailand)		LOS (Qatar)		BUR (Thailand)		Pts
Pos.	Rider	Bike	R1	R2	R1	R2	R1	R2	R1	R2	R1	R2	R1	R2	Pts
1	(Japan) Yuki Takahashi	Honda	1	7	11	4	**Ret**	**1**	**1**	**1**	**1**	**1**	**1**	**1**	227
2	(Japan) Tomoyoshi Koyama	Honda	12	3	6	5	2	2	3	2	Ret	3	5	2	164
3	(Indonesia) Ahmad Yudhistira	Kawasaki	Ret	2	1	Ret	11	8	4	3	3	2	3	19	139
4	(Japan) Yuki Ito	Yamaha	6	Ret	3	Ret	1	3	5	4	21	6	9	9	115
5	(Indonesia) Dimas Ekky Pratama	Honda	5	4	Ret	**2**	4	7	9	11	6	Ret	6	3	114
6	(Thailand) Ratthapong Wilairot	Honda	3	Ret	4	3	Ret	Ret	2	22	Ret	21	4	6	88
7	(Japan) Noriyuki Haga	Suzuki	17	Ret	9	7	3	5	22	8	8	8	Ret	8	75
8	(Thailand) Jakkrit Sawangswat	Honda	7	9	7	6			Ret	Ret	2	5	Ret	22	66
9	(Indonesia) Fadli Immammuddin	Honda	8	6	2	1									63
10	(Malaysia) Zaqhwan Zaidi	Honda							7	7	5	4	7	5	62
11	(Japan) Makoto Inagaki	Yamaha	Ret	5	Ret	9	Ret	4	Ret	10	4	Ret	10	Ret	56
12	(Australia) Mark Aitchison	Yamaha	11	Ret	8	8	6	6	8	13					52
13	(Malaysia) Hazlanshah Md Noor	Kawasaki	10	11	12	13	5	12	14	14	14	10	14	21	47
14	(Indonesia) Andi Farid Izdihar	Honda							11	5	7	7	Ret	4	47
15	(Japan) Mitsunori Okamura	Kawasaki	Ret	15	Ret	15	7	9	13	15	9	9	11	10	47
16	(Malaysia) Zamri Baba	Honda	**2**	**1**	**Ret**	DNS									45
17	(Indonesia) Rafid Topan Sucipto	Suzuki	9	12	5	Ret	16	14	Ret	Ret	10	13	12	12	41
18	(Malaysia) Farid Badrul Hisham	Kawasaki	4	10	10	10	DNS	DNS	16	18	17	Ret	13	Ret	34
19	(Thailand) Anucha Nakcharoensri	Yamaha					Ret	18	10	9			2	EX	33
20	(Thailand) Suhathai Chaemsup	Honda	13	13	13	11	Ret	11	15	17	11	11	Ret	15	31
21	(Japan) Hikari Okubo	Honda					8	13					8	7	28
22	(Japan) Taiga Hada	Honda	21	8	16	14	Ret	24	12	6	Ret	18			24
23	(Thailand) Anupab Sarmoon	Yamaha	Ret	DNS			9	17	6	12					21
24	(Japan) Okuno Tsubasa	Yamaha					10	10							12
25	(Malaysia) Fitri Ashraff Razali	Yamaha	16	18	14	16	Ret	23	21	19	13	12	17	20	9
26	(Australia) Aaron Morris	Yamaha	14	14	18	18			Ret	20	15	14			7
27	(Malaysia) Ahmad Afiff Amran	Yamaha	18	17	15	21	DNS	15	17	16	12	Ret			6
28	(Australia) Michael Blair	Yamaha	15	16	17	Ret	12	16	19	Ret	16	15			6
29	(Japan) Ryuji Yokoe	Yamaha											Ret	11	5
30	(Thailand) Pongpeera Khaknakhup	Honda	19	19	20	17	DNQ	DNQ	18	Ret	18	Ret	15	13	4
31	(Indonesia) Dwi Satria	Honda			Ret	12									4
32	(Thailand) Aekkachai Chiengwong	Kawasaki	Ret	20	19	20	15	22	20	Ret	19	16	18	14	3
33	(Japan) Yohei Iganami	Suzuki					13	19							3
34	(Japan) Atsushi Kawaguchi	Honda					14	20							2
35	(Australia) Callum Spriggs	Yamaha	WD	WD	23	22	17	21	23	21	20	17			0
36	(Japan) Yoichi Hosono	Yamaha			21	19									0
37	(Malaysia) Akmal Hisyam	Honda	WD	WD	22	23	DNQ	DNQ	Ret	23	Ret	19	19	23	0
38	(Thailand) Ratthapong Boonlert	Yamaha	20	21											0
39	(Qatar) Essa Mohamed Al-Mutawa	Yamaha									Ret	20			0
40	(Thailand) Decha Kraisart	Yamaha											20	EX	0
41	(Indonesia) Mohammad Reihan	Kawasaki			Ret	Ret									0
42	(Saudi Arabia) Abdul Aziz Baker	Kawasaki									DNS	DNS			0
43	(Thailand) Chalermpol Polamai	Yamaha											DNS	DNS	0
Riders ineligible for points due to competing full time in other series
-	(Thailand) Thitipong Warokorn	Honda											6	5	0

Colour	Result
Gold	Winner
Silver	Second place
Bronze	Third place
Green	Points classification
Blue	Non-points classification
Blue	Non-classified finish (NC)
Purple	Retired, not classified (Ret)
Red	Did not qualify (DNQ)
Red	Did not pre-qualify (DNPQ)
Black	Disqualified (DSQ)
White	Did not start (DNS)
White	Withdrew (WD)
White	Race cancelled (C)
Blank	Did not practice (DNP)
Blank	Did not arrive (DNA)
Blank	Excluded (EX)

**Bold** – Pole position
Italics – Fastest lap

==== Asia Production 250 ====
Pos.	Rider	Bike	SEP (Malaysia)		SEN (Indonesia)		SUZ (Japan)		BUR (Thailand)		LOS (Qatar)		BUR (Thailand)		Pts
Pos.	Rider	Bike	R1	R2	R1	R2	R1	R2	R1	R2	R1	R2	R1	R2	Pts
1	(Japan) Takehiro Yamamoto	Kawasaki	1	4	C	3	**1**	**1**	3	3	**1**	**1**	2	2	226
2	(Thailand) Nakarin Atiratphuvapat	Honda	4	3	C	2	DSQ	2	**1**	**1**	3	5	1	1	196
3	(Thailand) Apiwat Wongthananon	Honda	**2**	**1**	**C**	**1**	2	3	2	10	4	3	**4**	**6**	184
4	(Thailand) Vorapong Malahuan	Honda	3	2	C	4	7	32	8	5	20	11	Ret	3	98
5	(Japan) Ayumu Tanaka	Yamaha	6	6	C	Ret	5	4	5	Ret	2	6	11	DNS	90
6	(Malaysia) Kasma Daniel	Yamaha	9	8	C	10	Ret	14	Ret	8	7	2	8	4	81
7	(Thailand) Peerapong Boonlert	Yamaha	7	Ret	C	7	16	20	11	4	9	4	6	9	73
8	(Japan) Ryonosuke Hyodo	Kawasaki	5	5	C	9	3	5	17	12	DNS	DNS	Ret	12	64
9	(Indonesia) Galang Hendra Pratama	Yamaha	11	10	C	5	4	10	Ret	9	Ret	DNS	13	15	52
10	(Thailand) Sitthisak Onchawiang	Honda							4	2			7	16	42
11	(Thailand) Peerapong Loiboonpeng	Yamaha	8	Ret	C	Ret	17	18	Ret	11	14	13	5	5	40
12	(Indonesia) Imanuel Putra Pratna	Yamaha	10	9	C	8	WD	WD	14	15	Ret	9	17	10	37
13	(Indonesia) Andy Muhammad Fadly	Kawasaki	16	13	C	6	9	16	10	Ret	Ret	10	15	14	35
14	(Indonesia) Sigit Purno Harjono	Yamaha	WD	WD	C	Ret	6	7	Ret	13	6	Ret	14	Ret	34
15	(Indonesia) Rusman Fadhil	Yamaha	14	7	C	DNS	26	13	12	7	11	14	23	24	34
16	(Indonesia) Hasyim Zaki Adil	Yamaha	Ret	15	C	Ret	Ret	8	16	14	5	7	Ret	21	31
17	(Thailand) Anupab Sarmoon	Yamaha											3	8	24
18	(Malaysia) Muzakkir Mohamed	Kawasaki			C	12	13	19	13	23	10	16	12	13	23
19	(Japan) Yuta Sano	Honda					10	12	6	Ret					20
20	(Thailand) Ratthapong Boonlert	Yamaha							7	6			Ret	19	19
21	(Malaysia) Azroy Anuar	Honda							19	21	8	8	Ret	18	16
22	(China) Li Zheng Pang	Yamaha	12	14	C	14	19	21	15	Ret	13	15	21	28	13
23	(Japan) Katsuto Sano	Honda					Ret	11	9	Ret					12
24	(Thailand) Passawit Thitivararak	Honda											9	11	12
25	(Japan) Masaharu Ono	Honda	13	24	C	21	8	DSQ	Ret	DNS					11
26	(Indonesia) Reynaldo Ratukore	Yamaha					Ret	6							10
27	(Malaysia) Amirul Ariff Musa	Honda	Ret	11	C	20	11	Ret							10
28	(Thailand) Kritchaporn Kaewsonthi	Honda											Ret	7	9
29	(Thailand) Akkarak Tesang	Yamaha											8	Ret	8
30	(Japan) Naoko Takasugi	Yamaha					18	17	18	16	12	12	26	30	8
31	(Japan) Ruka Wada	Kawasaki					21	9							7
32	(Indonesia) Irfan Ardiansyah	Yamaha			C	11									5
33	(Malaysia) Fairuz Nasir	Kawasaki	Ret	21	C	15	12	26							5
34	(Indonesia) Fitriansyah Kete	Yamaha	Ret	12	C	Ret									4
35	(Indonesia) Iman Micko Eryandi	Yamaha	20	22	C	13	23	27	24	24	21	22	24	25	3
36	(Japan) Ryuya Maeda	Yamaha					14	31							2
37	(Australia) Brandon Paul Demmery	Yamaha	15	19	C	19	24	28	25	20	17	19	19	DNS	1
38	(Japan) Karen Ogura	Honda					15	25							1
39	(China) Meng Xing Bin	Yamaha	18	20	C	17	20	24	22	18	15	20	20	26	1
40	(Malaysia) Izzat Zaidi	Yamaha	17	18	C	Ret	Ret	15	20	17	18	21	18	23	1
41	(South Korea) Lim Hogon	Yamaha	19	23	C	16	22	23	23	19	16	17	22	27	0
42	(Malaysia) Saiful Izman Zamani	Kawasaki							21	22	19	18	16	22	0
43	(Malaysia) Siti Norafizah	Kawasaki	Ret	16											0
44	(Thailand) Somkiat Chantra	Honda											Ret	17	0
45	(Japan) Katsuki Satori	Yamaha	Ret	17	C	18	DNS	22	DNS	Ret					0
46	(Japan) Daiki Uehara	Yamaha											27	20	0
47	(South Korea) Baik Minseok	Yamaha	21	25	C	Ret	25	30	Ret	25	22	23	25	29	0
48	(Indonesia) Syarif Alkadrie	Yamaha			C	22									0
49	(Japan) Reina Shiraishi	Yamaha	22	26	C	DNS	Ret	29							0
50	(Malaysia) Luth Harith Erwan	Honda	Ret	Ret											0
51	(Indonesia) Wilman Hammar	Yamaha			C	Ret									0
52	(Indonesia) Hendriansyah	Yamaha			C	Ret									0
53	(Indonesia) Alshad Ahmad	Yamaha			C	Ret									0

Colour	Result
Gold	Winner
Silver	Second place
Bronze	Third place
Green	Points classification
Blue	Non-points classification
Blue	Non-classified finish (NC)
Purple	Retired, not classified (Ret)
Red	Did not qualify (DNQ)
Red	Did not pre-qualify (DNPQ)
Black	Disqualified (DSQ)
White	Did not start (DNS)
White	Withdrew (WD)
White	Race cancelled (C)
Blank	Did not practice (DNP)
Blank	Did not arrive (DNA)
Blank	Excluded (EX)

**Bold** – Pole position
Italics – Fastest lap

==== Underbone 130 ====
Pos.	Rider	Bike	SEP (Malaysia)		SEN (Indonesia)		SUZ (Japan)		BUR (Thailand)		LOS (Qatar)		BUR (Thailand)		Pts
Pos.	Rider	Bike	R1	R2	R1	R2	R1	R2	R1	R2	R1	R2	R1	R2	Pts
1	(Indonesia) Gupita Kresna	Kawasaki	7	3	**2**	**1**	**2**	**3**	1	2	2	4	2	Ret	204
2	(Malaysia) Norizman Ismail	Honda	Ret	2	1	7	1	8	10	1	15	11	11	15	130
3	(Indonesia) Ferlando Herdian	Yamaha	4	5	3	3	Ret	1	6	3	7	7	12	Ret	129
4	(Malaysia) Sasitharen Sukumaran	Honda	15	Ret	7	Ret	3	7	Ret	5	6	2	3	5	103
5	(Indonesia) Anggi Permana Putra	Yamaha	6	6	Ret	Ret	6	5	4	11	9	Ret	**6**	**1**	101
6	(Malaysia) Adib Rosley	Yamaha	12	Ret	4	Ret	7	9	9	Ret	11	9	1	4	90
7	(Malaysia) Ahmad Fazrul Sham	Yamaha	8	7	16	8	8	13	5	7	18	1	Ret	8	89
8	(Malaysia) Azam Omar	Yamaha			14	6	10	6	3	Ret	3	6	5	9	88
9	(Malaysia) Fareez Afeez	Yamaha	Ret	10	Ret	4	4	Ret	2	Ret	4	3	Ret	13	84
10	(Malaysia) Affendi Rosli	Yamaha	Ret	9	Ret	2	Ret	2	Ret	Ret	8	14	Ret	3	73
11	(Indonesia) Reza Fahlevy	Yamaha	13	13	6	5	12	10	8	9	10	8	Ret	12	70
12	(Malaysia) Elly Illias	Honda	Ret	Ret	10	10	9	11	7	4	12	10	Ret	11	61
13	(Indonesia) Florianus Roy	Yamaha	14	14	9	9	DNS	Ret	12	10	14	12	4	6	57
14	(Indonesia) Wahyu Aji Trilaksana	Yamaha			Ret	Ret	5	4	**Ret**	**Ret**	5	16	Ret	2	55
15	(Malaysia) Amirul Ariff Musa	Honda							11	6	**1**	**5**			51
16	(Malaysia) Rozaiman Said	Honda	5	15	5	13	Ret	Ret					7	7	44
17	(Malaysia) Muhaimin Roslan	Yamaha	3	1											41
18	(Indonesia) Hokky Krisdianto	Yamaha	2	4	Ret	Ret									33
19	(Malaysia) Azhar Jalil	Yamaha	Ret	Ret	15	Ret	11	12	Ret	13	16	13	10	10	28
20	(Malaysia) Ahmad Fazli Sham	Yamaha	**1**	**Ret**											25
21	(Malaysia) Khairil Hisham	Yamaha							13	8	13	17	8	16	22
22	(Malaysia) Saiful Izman Zamani	Yamaha	10	Ret	8	Ret	Ret	14							16
23	(Indonesia) Iswandi Muis	Yamaha	11	8											13
24	(Indonesia) Maulana Noor Khairi	Yamaha			Ret	12	Ret	16			Ret	DNS	9	14	13
25	(Malaysia) Ahmad Syukran Aizat	Yamaha	9	11											12
26	(Japan) Naoki Takahashi	Honda	Ret	12	17	14	Ret	15	Ret	12	17	15	Ret	Ret	12
27	(Indonesia) Sulung Giwa Husna	Yamaha			13	11									8
28	(Indonesia) Wahyu Widodo	Honda			11	Ret									5
29	(Indonesia) Richard Taroreh	Yamaha			12	Ret									4
30	(Indonesia) Hadi Wijaya	Yamaha			Ret	Ret									0
31	(Indonesia) Rendy Yusri	Yamaha	Ret	Ret	WD	WD									0

Colour	Result
Gold	Winner
Silver	Second place
Bronze	Third place
Green	Points classification
Blue	Non-points classification
Blue	Non-classified finish (NC)
Purple	Retired, not classified (Ret)
Red	Did not qualify (DNQ)
Red	Did not pre-qualify (DNPQ)
Black	Disqualified (DSQ)
White	Did not start (DNS)
White	Withdrew (WD)
White	Race cancelled (C)
Blank	Did not practice (DNP)
Blank	Did not arrive (DNA)
Blank	Excluded (EX)

**Bold** – Pole position
Italics – Fastest lap

== Extra links ==
- Official website
