= 2014 Asia Road Racing Championship =

19th season Asia Road Racing Championship

2014 Asia Road Racing Championship
Previous:	2013	Next:	2015

The 2014 FIM Asia Road Racing Championship was the 19th season of the Asia Road Racing Championship. The Season started on 20 April at Sepang International Circuit in Malaysia and ended on 14 December at Lusail International Circuit in Qatar.

In the Supersport 600cc class, Zaqhwan Zaidi won the title after beating closest rival Yuki Ito by just one point. While in the Underbone 130cc Gupita Kresna won the title beating closest rival Taiga Hada. Khairul Idham Pawi won the Asian Dream Cup title after beating closest rival Aditya Pangestu.

This season marked the final season of Japanese veteran rider and one time ARRC champion Katsuaki Fujiwara as he retired at the end of the season after 4 years racing in the series.

== Race calendar and results ==
Round	Circuit	Date	SS600 Winners	UB130 Winners	Asia Dream Cup Winners
1	(Malaysia) Sepang International Circuit	17–20 April	R1: (Malaysia) Zamri Baba	R1: (Malaysia) Norizman Ismail	R1: (Malaysia) Khairul Idham Pawi
1	(Malaysia) Sepang International Circuit	17–20 April	R2: (Malaysia) Zamri Baba	R2: (Malaysia) Ahmad Fazli Sham	R2: (Malaysia) Khairul Idham Pawi
2	(Indonesia) Sentul International Circuit	13–15 June	R1: (Indonesia) Fadli Immammuddin	R1: (Thailand) Vorapong Malahuan	R1: (Japan) Teppei Nagoe
2	(Indonesia) Sentul International Circuit	13–15 June	R2: (Malaysia) Zaqhwan Zaidi	R2: (Indonesia) Hendriansyah	R2: (Malaysia) Khairul Idham Pawi
3	(Japan) Autopolis	15–17 August	R1: (Japan) Katsuaki Fujiwara	R1: (Japan) Kazuki Masaki	R1: (Malaysia) Khairul Idham Pawi
3	(Japan) Autopolis	15–17 August	R2: (Japan) Makoto Tamada	R2: (Indonesia) Hadi Wijaya	R2: (Malaysia) Khairul Idham Pawi
4	(Japan) Suzuka Circuit	5–7 September	R1: (Japan) Katsuaki Fujiwara	R1: (Malaysia) Amirul Ariff Musa	R1: (Malaysia) Khairul Idham Pawi
4	(Japan) Suzuka Circuit	5–7 September	R2: (Japan) Yuki Ito	R2: (Japan) Kazuki Masaki	R2: (Malaysia) Khairul Idham Pawi
5	(Thailand) Chang International Circuit	7–9 November	R1: (Japan) Yuki Ito	R1: (Malaysia) Amirul Ariff Musa	R1: (Indonesia) Aditya Pangestu Hanafi
5	(Thailand) Chang International Circuit	7–9 November	R2: (Japan) Yuki Ito	R2: (Japan) Kazuki Masaki	R2: (Japan) Syunya Mori
6	(Qatar) Lusail International Circuit	12–14 December	R1: (Malaysia) Zamri Baba	R1: (Indonesia) Reza Fahlevy	R1: (Malaysia) Khairul Idham Pawi
6	(Qatar) Lusail International Circuit	12–14 December	R2: (Malaysia) Zaqhwan Zaidi	R2: (Indonesia) Gupita Kresna	R2: (Malaysia) Khairul Idham Pawi

== Entry list ==
=== Supersport 600 ===
SS600 Entry List
Team	Constructor	No.	Rider	Rounds
AP Honda Thailand; AP Honda SAG Team	Honda	11	(Thailand) Thitipong Warokorn	6
AP Honda Thailand; AP Honda SAG Team	Honda	24	(Thailand) Peerawat Wongthananon	All
AP Honda Thailand; AP Honda SAG Team	Honda	27	(Thailand) Anucha Nakcharoensri	5
AP Honda Thailand; AP Honda SAG Team	Honda	88	(Switzerland) Jesko Raffin	6
AP Honda Thailand; AP Honda SAG Team	Honda	91	(Thailand) Jakkrit Sawangswat	All
AP Honda Thailand; AP Honda SAG Team	Honda	95	(Thailand) Nakarin Atiratphuvapat	5
AR–1 Pikoli Abirawa	Honda	99	(Indonesia) Dellu Agung	2
Astra Honda Racing Team	Honda	20	(Indonesia) Dimas Ekky Pratama	All
Astra Honda Racing Team	Honda	96	(Indonesia) Denny Triyugo Laksono	1–2
Astra Honda Racing Team	Honda	162	(Indonesia) Fadli Immammuddin	4–6
Harian Metro Y-TEQ SCK Honda Racing	Honda	30	(Malaysia) Fitri Ashraff Razali	1–2, 5
Harian Metro Y-TEQ SCK Honda Racing	Honda	54	(Japan) Katsuyuki Tajiri	3–4
T.Pro Yuzy Honda NTS	Honda	34	(Japan) Satoru Iwata	All
T.Pro Yuzy Honda NTS	Honda	71	(Japan) Tomoyoshi Koyama	All
T.Pro Yuzy Honda NTS	Honda	162	(Indonesia) Fadli Immammuddin	1–2
Thai Honda Racing Thailand	Honda	59	(Thailand) Ratthapong Wilairot	All
Thai Honda Racing Thailand	Honda	82	(Thailand) Suhathai Chaemsup	All
MUSASHI Boon Siew Honda Racing	Honda	21	(Malaysia) Zaqhwan Zaidi	All
MUSASHI Boon Siew Honda Racing	Honda	52	(Malaysia) Zamri Baba	All
MUSASHI Boon Siew Honda Racing	Honda	100	(Japan) Makoto Tamada	All
RSG&DREAM Kitakyushu Racing	Honda	36	(Japan) Shogo Nishiyama	3
ToyBoy&TANEJUKU	Honda	690	(Japan) Yoshinori Yamauchi	4
WDM Aspira Federal Oil	Honda	81	(Indonesia) Dwi Satria	2
BEET Kawasaki Racing	Kawasaki	37	(Japan) Katsuaki Fujiwara	All
BikeART Racing Kawasaki	Kawasaki	23	(Malaysia) Hazlanshah Md Noor	All
BikeART Racing Kawasaki	Kawasaki	83	(Malaysia) Farid Badrul Hisham	All
Manual Tech KYT Kawasaki Racing	Kawasaki	25	(Indonesia) Muhammad Reihan	2
Manual Tech KYT Kawasaki Racing	Kawasaki	28	(Indonesia) Ivos A. Rianda	All
Manual Tech KYT Kawasaki Racing	Kawasaki	33	(Indonesia) Ahmad Yudhistira	All
RS-ITOH&ASIA	Kawasaki	32	(Japan) Mitsunori Okamura	3–4
Saudi Falcons	Kawasaki	188	(Saudi Arabia) Abdul Aziz Binladin	6
Hamamatsu Team Titan	Suzuki	73	(Japan) Yohei Iganami	4
TAKE–UP&SBS KIDANI	Suzuki	53	(Japan) Hiroshi Nagano	3
Akeno Speed Racing Team	Yamaha	15	(Japan) Ayumu Tanaka	4
Akeno Speed Racing Team	Yamaha	17	(Australia) Patrick Olson	3–5
Akeno Speed Racing Team	Yamaha	18	(Japan) Makoto Inagaki	All
Akeno Speed Racing Team	Yamaha	19	(Australia) Mark Aitchison	1–2
Akeno Speed Racing Team	Yamaha	22	(Japan) Tsubasa Okuno	3–4
Akeno Speed Racing Team	Yamaha	72	(Australia) Broc Parkes	6
Chunatsu Racing	Yamaha	41	(Indonesia) Yoichi Hosono	2
Finson Motorsports	Yamaha	64	(Australia) Aaron Morris	1–2
Finson Motorsports	Yamaha	65	(Australia) Hudson Pitt	2–5
Finson Motorsports	Yamaha	78	(Australia) Michael Blair	3–6
HITMAN RC KOSHIEN YAMAHA	Yamaha	63	(Japan) Shotaro Ogura	4
PETRONAS Hong Leong Yamaha	Yamaha	26	(Malaysia) Ahmad Fuad Baharudin	All
PETRONAS Hong Leong Yamaha	Yamaha	50	(Malaysia) Ahmad Afif Amran	All
PETRONAS Hong Leong Yamaha	Yamaha	76	(Japan) Yuki Ito	All
Yamaha Thailand Racing Team	Yamaha	46	(Thailand) Anupab Sarmoon	5
Yamaha Thailand Racing Team	Yamaha	67	(Thailand) Chalermpol Polamai	4

Key
Regular rider
Wildcard rider
Replacement rider

=== Underbone 130 ===
UB130 Entry List
Team	Constructor	No.	Rider	Rounds
Astra Honda Racing Team	Honda	21	(Indonesia) Owie Nurhuda	2
Harian Metro Y–TEQ SCK Honda Racing	Honda	4	(Malaysia) Norizman Ismail	All
Harian Metro Y–TEQ SCK Honda Racing	Honda	15	(Malaysia) Ahmad Fazrul Sham	All
Harian Metro Y–TEQ SCK Honda Racing	Honda	88	(Malaysia) Elly Idzlianizar Illias	1
JRA Group Indonesia Jatim Racing Team	Honda	40	(Indonesia) Nur Iwan	4
T.Pro Yuzy Honda	Honda	25	(Malaysia) Rozaiman Md Said	All
T.Pro Yuzy Honda	Honda	63	(Malaysia) Amirul Ariff Musa	All
T.Pro Yuzy Honda	Honda	91	(Malaysia) Sasitharen Sukumaran	1
T.Pro Yuzy Honda	Honda	93	(Japan) Taiga Hada	All
Team Honda RSC	Honda	38	(Japan) Kazuki Masaki	All
Thai Honda Racing Thailand	Honda	46	(Thailand) Vorapong Malahuan	1–5
Kawasaki KYT Rextor Manual Tech	Kawasaki	23	(Indonesia) Gupita Kresna	All
Suzuki Nisin Pikoli R9 KYB	Suzuki	180	(Indonesia) Harlan Fadhilah	2
BKMS Racing Team	Yamaha	72	(Indonesia) Rusman Fadhil	2
Faito Factory Racing	Yamaha	12	(Indonesia) Hadi Wijaya	1–3
Faito Factory Racing	Yamaha	27	(Indonesia) Rio Dewara	1–3
Faito Factory Racing	Yamaha	61	(Indonesia) Ferlando Herdian	4–6
Faito Factory Racing	Yamaha	125	(Indonesia) Reza Fahlevy	4–6
JRA Wardhana IRC Indonesia Jatim Racing; JRA R7 IRC NK Jatim Racing	Yamaha	40	(Indonesia) Nur Iwan	2
JRA Wardhana IRC Indonesia Jatim Racing; JRA R7 IRC NK Jatim Racing	Yamaha	60	(Indonesia) Wahyu Aji Trilaksana	2, 4
JRA Wardhana IRC Indonesia Jatim Racing; JRA R7 IRC NK Jatim Racing	Yamaha	70	(Indonesia) Rocky Permadi	2, 4–6
JRA Wardhana IRC Indonesia Jatim Racing; JRA R7 IRC NK Jatim Racing	Yamaha	72	(Indonesia) Rusman Fadhil	5–6
Outdo Koyoko Motul Y.Y Pang Racing Team	Yamaha	18	(Malaysia) Tengku Amirul Haffiruddin	1
Outdo Koyoko Motul Y.Y Pang Racing Team	Yamaha	28	(Malaysia) Izzat Zaidi	All
Outdo Koyoko Motul Y.Y Pang Racing Team	Yamaha	57	(Indonesia) Hokky Krisdianto	All
PETRONAS Hong Leong Yamaha	Yamaha	36	(Malaysia) Affendi Rosli	All
PETRONAS Hong Leong Yamaha	Yamaha	52	(Malaysia) Shariffudin Shamshudin	1
PETRONAS Hong Leong Yamaha	Yamaha	127	(Malaysia) Kasma Daniel	1
PETRONAS Hong Leong Yamaha	Yamaha	146	(Malaysia) Ahmad Fazli Sham	All
R9 Ardians Gandasari	Yamaha	75	(Indonesia) Irwan Ardiansyah	2
R9 Ardians Gandasari	Yamaha	76	(Indonesia) Hendriansyah	2

Key
Regular rider
Wildcard rider
Replacement rider

=== Asia Dream Cup ===
Asia Dream Cup Entry List
Constructor	Bike	No.	Rider	Rounds
Honda	Honda CBR250RR	1	(Malaysia) Khairul Idham Pawi	All
Honda	Honda CBR250RR	2	(Japan) Reitoku Kurogi	All
Honda	Honda CBR250RR	3	(India) Sumit Loucs Toppo	All
Honda	Honda CBR250RR	4	(Indonesia) Andi Farid Izdihar	All
Honda	Honda CBR250RR	5	(Japan) Teppei Nagoe	All
Honda	Honda CBR250RR	6	(Japan) Syunya Mori	All
Honda	Honda CBR250RR	7	(Malaysia) Harith Farhan Baharin	All
Honda	Honda CBR250RR	8	(Chinese Taipei) Chuang An Yu	All
Honda	Honda CBR250RR	9	(India) Prabhu Arunagiri	All
Honda	Honda CBR250RR	10	(Australia) Lachlan Kavney	1–5
Honda	Honda CBR250RR	11	(Indonesia) Aditya Pangestu	All
Honda	Honda CBR250RR	12	(India) Sarath Kumar	All
Honda	Honda CBR250RR	13	(Japan) Koko Tadachi	All
Honda	Honda CBR250RR	14	(Singapore) Arsyad Rusydi	All
Honda	Honda CBR250RR	15	(Sri Lanka) Shoel Ervin Daniel	All
Honda	Honda CBR250RR	16	(Chinese Taipei) Lee Yen Ching	All
Honda	Honda CBR250RR	17	(Thailand) Kiadtisak Chauwiset	All
Honda	Honda CBR250RR	18	(Thailand) Pasawit Thitivararak	All

== Championship standings ==
Points

Position	**1st**	**2nd**	**3rd**	**4th**	**5th**	**6th**	**7th**	**8th**	**9th**	**10th**	**11th**	**12th**	**13th**	**14th**	**15th**
Points	25	20	16	13	11	10	9	8	7	6	5	4	3	2	1

=== Riders standings ===
==== Supersport 600 ====
Pos.	Rider	Bike	SEP (Malaysia)		SEN (Indonesia)		AUT (Japan)		SUZ (Japan)		BUR (Thailand)		LOS (Qatar)		Pts
Pos.	Rider	Bike	R1	R2	R1	R2	R1	R2	R1	R2	R1	R2	R1	R2	Pts
1	(Malaysia) Zaqhwan Zaidi	Honda	Ret	5	6	1	5	7	4	6	2	3	2	1	170
2	(Japan) Yuki Ito	Yamaha	2	Ret	11	7	2	Ret	**5**	**1**	1	1	7	2	169
3	(Japan) Katsuaki Fujiwara	Kawasaki	**3**	**2**	Ret	4	**1**	**4**	1	2	8	9	11	13	155
4	(Malaysia) Zamri Baba	Honda	1	1	**3**	**22**	4	2	DNS	DNS	Ret	5	1	3	151
5	(Japan) Tomoyoshi Koyama	Honda	7	8	9	6	3	DSQ	3	3	3	2	4	4	144
6	(Japan) Makoto Tamada	Honda	4	3	10	Ret	10	1	2	5	5	4	10	7	136
7	(Indonesia) Ahmad Yudhistira	Kawasaki	6	4	2	3	16	12	13	14	7	8	3	5	112
8	(Thailand) Jakkrit Sawangswat	Honda	8	6	7	Ret	8	3	7	7	4	Ret	9	8	97
9	(Indonesia) Dimas Ekky Pratama	Honda	9	10	4	2	9	9	6	4	19	11	Ret	9	95
10	(Thailand) Ratthapong Wilairot	Honda	5	12	12	Ret	7	6	14	13	**6**	**6**	5	6	84
11	(Japan) Satoru Iwata	Honda	14	7	17	17	6	8	8	11	12	16	6	10	62
12	(Indonesia) Fadli Immammuddin	Honda	Ret	9	1	Ret			9	Ret	10	10	16	17	51
13	(Japan) Makoto Inagaki	Yamaha	12	13	DSQ	15	Ret	11	Ret	8	Ret	13	**8**	DSQ	32
14	(Thailand) Suhathai Chaemsup	Honda	18	18	DSQ	16	19	13	Ret	12	9	7	12	11	32
15	(Japan) Mitsunori Okamura	Kawasaki					11	5	11	9					28
16	(Thailand) Peerawat Wongthananon	Honda	16	Ret	13	9	15	18	18	16	11	12	Ret	14	22
17	(Indonesia) Ivos A. Rianda	Kawasaki	17	20	8	5	DNS	DNS	DNS	DNS	Ret	Ret	19	20	19
18	(Australia) Mark Aitchison	Yamaha	10	11	Ret	10									17
19	(Malaysia) Ahmad Fuad Baharudin	Yamaha	13	16	Ret	19	13	14	19	18	18	19	13	12	15
20	(Malaysia) Farid Badrul Hisham	Kawasaki	Ret	17	Ret	18	12	10	17	17	13	14	Ret	Ret	15
21	(Malaysia) Hazlanshah Md Noor	Kawasaki	15	14	Ret	8	Ret	20	20	20	14	Ret	18	16	13
22	(Indonesia) Denny Triyugo Laksono	Honda	20	Ret	5	Ret									11
23	(Australia) Aaron Morris	Yamaha	11	15	15	12									11
24	(Australia) Patrick Olson	Yamaha					20	15	10	26	DNS	DNS			7
25	(Thailand) Chalermpol Polamai	Yamaha							16	10					6
26	(Malaysia) Ahmad Afif Amran	Yamaha	21	19	19	13	18	21	Ret	24	17	18	14	15	6
27	(Indonesia) Dwi Satria	Honda			16	11									5
28	(Japan) Tsubasa Okuno	Yamaha					17	19	12	Ret					4
29	(Indonesia) Muhammad Reihan	Kawasaki			14	Ret									2
30	(Malaysia) Fitri Ashraff Razali	Honda	19	21	18	14					DNS	DNS			2
31	(Japan) Katsuyuki Tajiri	Honda					14	17	23	21					2
32	(Japan) Ayumu Tanaka	Yamaha							15	15					2
33	(Thailand) Nakarin Atiratphuvapat	Honda									15	15			2
	(Japan) Shogo Nishiyama	Honda					22	16							0
	(Thailand) Anucha Nakcharoensri	Honda									16	17			0
	(Australia) Michael Blair	Yamaha					Ret	22	21	19	20	20	20	19	0
	(Indonesia) Dellu Agung	Honda			20	20									0
	(Indonesia) Yoichi Hosono	Yamaha			21	21									0
	(Australia) Hudson Pitt	Yamaha			22	23	21	23	25	27	22	Ret			0
	(Thailand) Anupab Sarmoon	Yamaha									21	Ret			0
	(Saudi Arabia) Abdul Aziz Binladin	Kawasaki											Ret	21	0
	(Japan) Shotaro Ogura	Yamaha							22	23					0
	(Japan) Yohei Iganami	Suzuki							Ret	22					0
	(Japan) Hiroshi Nagano	Suzuki					24	DNS							0
	(Japan) Yoshinori Yamauchi	Honda							24	25					0
Riders ineligible for points due to competing full time in other series
	(Switzerland) Jesko Raffin	Honda											15	18	0
	(Australia) Broc Parkes	Yamaha											17	DNS	0
	(Thailand) Thitipong Warokorn	Honda											DNS	DNS	
Pos.	Rider	Bike	SEP (Malaysia)		SEN (Indonesia)		AUT (Japan)		SUZ (Japan)		BUR (Thailand)		LOS (Qatar)		Pts

Colour	Result
Gold	Winner
Silver	Second place
Bronze	Third place
Green	Points classification
Blue	Non-points classification
Blue	Non-classified finish (NC)
Purple	Retired, not classified (Ret)
Red	Did not qualify (DNQ)
Red	Did not pre-qualify (DNPQ)
Black	Disqualified (DSQ)
White	Did not start (DNS)
White	Withdrew (WD)
White	Race cancelled (C)
Blank	Did not practice (DNP)
Blank	Did not arrive (DNA)
Blank	Excluded (EX)

**Bold** – Pole position
Italics – Fastest lap
Source :

==== Underbone 130 ====
Pos.	Rider	Bike	SEP (Malaysia)		SEN (Indonesia)		AUT (Japan)		SUZ (Japan)		BUR (Thailand)		LOS (Qatar)		Pts
Pos.	Rider	Bike	R1	R2	R1	R2	R1	R2	R1	R2	R1	R2	R1	R2	Pts
1	(Indonesia) Gupita Kresna	Kawasaki	2	6	**2**	**2**	8	2	6	9	**4**	**2**	**13**	**1**	176
2	(Japan) Taiga Hada	Honda	10	8	4	12	6	5	3	7	2	3	6	12	127
3	(Malaysia) Amirul Ariff Musa	Honda	9	7	15	9	**10**	**4**	1	6	1	Ret	9	3	126
4	(Malaysia) Norizman Ismail	Honda	1	Ret	3	5	3	11	5	2	8	10	Ret	9	125
5	(Japan) Kazuki Masaki	Honda	8	Ret	Ret	3	1	Ret	Ret	1	5	1	12	7	123
6	(Malaysia) Affendi Rosli	Yamaha	4	2	Ret	10	9	7	8	4	7	4	5	5	120
7	(Malaysia) Ahmad Fazli Sham	Yamaha	**5**	**1**	16	7	2	3	**7**	**11**	6	12	11	13	117
8	(Malaysia) Rozaiman Md Said	Honda	3	3	5	Ret	4	Ret	2	10	10	5	7	10	114
9	(Thailand) Vorapong Malahuan	Honda	11	4	1	Ret	Ret	6	Ret	5	12	6			78
10	(Malaysia) Ahmad Fazrul Sham	Honda	16	Ret	11	15	Ret	9	Ret	Ret	11	7	2	2	67
11	(Indonesia) Reza Fahlevy	Yamaha							4	8	Ret	13	1	6	59
12	(Indonesia) Ferlando Herdian	Yamaha							DSQ	3	3	Ret	4	4	58
13	(Indonesia) Hokky Krisdianto	Yamaha	12	DNS	7	6	7	Ret	DNS	Ret	9	9	10	11	57
14	(Indonesia) Hadi Wijaya	Yamaha	14	10	10	13	5	1							53
15	(Indonesia) Hendriansyah	Yamaha			6	1									35
16	(Indonesia) Rusman Fadhil	Yamaha			Ret	Ret					13	8	3	8	35
17	(Malaysia) Izzat Zaidi	Yamaha	15	Ret	Ret	11	11	8	Ret	Ret	Ret	11	8	Ret	32
18	(Malaysia) Sasitharen Sukumaran	Honda	7	5											20
19	(Indonesia) Irwan Ardiansyah	Yamaha			14	4									15
20	(Indonesia) Harlan Fadhilah	Suzuki			12	8									12
21	(Malaysia) Elly Idzlianizar Illias	Honda	6	Ret											10
22	(Malaysia) Tengku Amirul Haffiruddin	Yamaha	13	9											10
23	(Indonesia) Rio Dewara	Yamaha	18	Ret	Ret	17	12	10							10
24	(Indonesia) Owie Nurhuda	Honda			8	Ret									8
25	(Indonesia) Nur Iwan	Yamaha			9	16									7
25	(Indonesia) Nur Iwan	Honda							DNS	DNS					7
26	(Malaysia) Shariffudin Shamshudin	Yamaha	17	11											5
27	(Indonesia) Wahyu Aji Trilaksana	Yamaha			13	14			DNS	DNS					5
28	(Malaysia) Kasma Daniel	Yamaha	19	12											4
29	(Indonesia) Rocky Permadi	Yamaha			DNS	DNS			DNS	DNS	DNS	DNS	DNQ	DNQ	
Pos.	Rider	Bike	SEP (Malaysia)		SEN (Indonesia)		AUT (Japan)		SUZ (Japan)		BUR (Thailand)		LOS (Qatar)		Pts

Colour	Result
Gold	Winner
Silver	Second place
Bronze	Third place
Green	Points classification
Blue	Non-points classification
Blue	Non-classified finish (NC)
Purple	Retired, not classified (Ret)
Red	Did not qualify (DNQ)
Red	Did not pre-qualify (DNPQ)
Black	Disqualified (DSQ)
White	Did not start (DNS)
White	Withdrew (WD)
White	Race cancelled (C)
Blank	Did not practice (DNP)
Blank	Did not arrive (DNA)
Blank	Excluded (EX)

**Bold** – Pole position
Italics – Fastest lap
Source :

==== Asia Dream Cup ====
Pos.	Rider	Bike	SEP (Malaysia)		SEN (Indonesia)		AUT (Japan)		SUZ (Japan)		BUR (Thailand)		LOS (Qatar)		Pts
Pos.	Rider	Bike	R1	R2	R1	R2	R1	R2	R1	R2	R1	R2	R1	R2	Pts
1	(Malaysia) Khairul Idham Pawi	Honda CBR250RR	**1**	**1**	**2**	**1**	1	1	**1**	**1**	**2**	**2**	**1**	**1**	285
2	(Indonesia) Aditya Pangestu	Honda CBR250RR	3	5	3	3	5	8	5	3	1	3	2	4	179
3	(Japan) Teppei Nagoe	Honda CBR250RR	2	2	1	Ret	2	2	2	6	5	4	3	Ret	175
4	(Japan) Syunya Mori	Honda CBR250RR	5	3	Ret	7	**3**	**3**	Ret	7	3	1	7	3	143
5	(Chinese Taipei) Chuang An Yu	Honda CBR250RR	4	7	4	11	4	6	4	2	6	5	4	Ret	130
6	(Indonesia) Andi Farid Izdihar	Honda CBR250RR	9	4	15	2	Ret	4	3	4	4	Ret	8	Ret	104
7	(Japan) Reitoku Kurogi	Honda CBR250RR	10	8	5	4	Ret	9	Ret	5	7	6	10	6	91
8	(India) Sarath Kumar	Honda CBR250RR	6	9	10	12	8	11	12	10	9	11	9	2	89
9	(India) Sumit Loucs Toppo	Honda CBR250RR	8	6	12	6	7	7	9	8	Ret	8	6	10	89
10	(Malaysia) Harith Farhan Baharin	Honda CBR250RR	7	Ret	7	Ret	6	5	Ret	DNS	8	7	5	5	78
11	(Philippines) Koko Tadachi	Honda CBR250RR	12	12	8	10	Ret	10	8	11	10	10	12	7	66
12	(Thailand) Passawit Thitivararak	Honda CBR250RR	Ret	Ret	9	9	Ret	14	7	9	Ret	9	13	9	49
13	(Thailand) Kiadtisak Chauwiset	Honda CBR250RR	11	10	6	5	DNS	13	Ret	13	13	13	15	13	48
14	(Sri Lanka) Shoel Ervin Daniel	Honda CBR250RR	13	13	13	13	9	15	10	12	12	12	16	12	42
15	(Singapore) Arsyad Rusydi	Honda CBR250RR	Ret	15	11	Ret	11	12	6	Ret	DNS	DNS	14	11	32
16	(India) Prabhu Arunagiri	Honda CBR250RR	Ret	Ret	Ret	8	DNS	DNS	DNQ	DNQ	11	15	11	8	27
17	(Chinese Taipei) Lee Yen Ching	Honda CBR250RR	14	14	14	14	10	16	11	14	14	14	17	14	27
18	(Australia) Lachlan Kavney	Honda CBR250RR	Ret	11	DNS	DNS	DNS	DNS	DNQ	DNQ	DNS	DNS			5
Pos.	Rider	Bike	SEP (Malaysia)		SEN (Indonesia)		AUT (Japan)		SUZ (Japan)		BUR (Thailand)		LOS (Qatar)		Pts

Colour	Result
Gold	Winner
Silver	Second place
Bronze	Third place
Green	Points classification
Blue	Non-points classification
Blue	Non-classified finish (NC)
Purple	Retired, not classified (Ret)
Red	Did not qualify (DNQ)
Red	Did not pre-qualify (DNPQ)
Black	Disqualified (DSQ)
White	Did not start (DNS)
White	Withdrew (WD)
White	Race cancelled (C)
Blank	Did not practice (DNP)
Blank	Did not arrive (DNA)
Blank	Excluded (EX)

**Bold** – Pole position
Italics – Fastest lap

== Extra links ==
- Official website
