= List of Grand Prix motorcycle racers: Z =

- (Italy) Oreste Zaccarelli
- (Brazil) Adilson Zaccari
- (Sweden) Rune Zalle
- (Italy) Andrea Zambotti
- (Australia) Jordan Zamora
- (Malaysia) Mohamad Zamri Baba
- (Italy) Massimo Zanarini
- (Argentina) Rene Zanatta
- (Italy) Germano Zanetti
- (Italy) Lorenzo Zanetti
- (Italy) Vincenzo Zanzi
- (Spain) Ramon Zapater
- (Italy) Andrea Zappa
- (Spain) Daniel Zarapico
- (France) Johann Zarco
- (Spain) Mario Zarco
- (Syria) Moyd Yaser Zarzar
- (Argentina) Pablo Zeballos
- (Italy) Marco Zecchi
- (Netherlands) Koen Zeelen
- (Netherlands) Wilco Zeelenberg
- (Austria) Mario Zehetner
- (Austria) Rudolf Zeller
- (Germany) Walter Zeller
- (Austria) Johann Zemsauer
- (Germany) Kai Zentner
- (Brazil) Silvio Cesar Zequim
- (Germany) Leon Ziesing
- (Italy) Giovanni Zigiotto
- (Germany) Sigi Zilmann
- (Germany) Marcus Zimmermann
- (Germany) Robert Zimmermann
- (Germany) Uwe Zimmermann
- (Italy) Luigi Zinzani
- (Netherlands) Willem Zoet
- (Italy) Giampiero Zubani
- (Germany) Patrik Zupancic
