= Muklada Sarapuech =

Thai motorcycle rider

Muklada Sarapuech มุกข์ลดา สารพืช
- Born: Pathum Thani, Thailand
- Occupation: Motorcycle racer
- Current series: WorldWCR
- Previous series: Asia Road Racing Championship
- Current team: EEST NJT Racing Team
- Previous teams: AP Honda Racing Thailand
- Bike number: 12

Championship titles
- 2015 Asia Dream Cup Winner
Statistics
WorldWCR
Active years	2026
Last season (2026)	6th (115 pts)
Starts / Wins / Podiums / Poles / F. laps / Points; 12 / 0 / 2 / 0 / 0 / 115
Asia Supersports 600
Active years	2022
Team(s)	AP Honda Racing Thailand
Starts / Wins / Podiums / Poles / F. laps / Points; 2 / 0 / 0 / 0 / 0 / 18
Asia Production 250
Active years	2016-2019, 2023
Team(s)	AP Honda Racing Thailand
Best season (2019)	4th (2 wins/143 pts)
Starts / Wins / Podiums / Poles / F. laps / Points; 47 / 4 / 12 / 7 / 2 / 416
Asia Dream Cup
Active years	2015
Championships	1
Starts / Wins / Podiums / Poles / F. laps / Points; 12 / 5 / 8 / N/A / N/A / 213.5
Asia Talent Cup
Active years	2014
Starts / Wins / Podiums / Poles / F. laps / Points; 9 / 0 / 0 / 0 / N/A / 32
ESBK Yamaha R7 Cup
Active years	2026
Starts / Wins / Podiums / Poles / F. laps / Points; 4 / 0 / 1 / 0 / 0 / 51

Muklada Sarapuech (Thai: มุกข์ลดา สารพืช, born 8 September 1993) is a Thai motorcycle racer who currently competes in the FIM Women's Circuit Racing World Championship and the Spanish (ESBK) Yamaha R7 Cup.

== Biography ==
Sarapuech was born on 8 September 1993 in Pathum Thani, Thailand. She started riding motorcycles at ten years old.

=== Racing Career ===
At the age of 12, Sarapuech started racing mini motos. She also raced scooters in her early years. She moved up to the 125 motorcycle class in the FMSCT Thailand Championship in 2012, and won three races the following year.

In 2014, Sarapuech competed in the Asia Talent Cup, finishing the season in 15th place.

Sarapuech won the 2015 Asia Dream Cup, the first female to win an ARRC title. After winning the title she was invited to compete in the two final rounds of the FIM CEV Repsol Moto3 Junior World Championship at Jerez and Valencia, however injuries prevented her from competing.

Competing in the JP250 class of the All Japan Road Race Championship in 2016, Sarapuech finished fourth overall. Switching to the AP250 class of the ARRC, she finished tenth in 2017. In 2018, she became the first female to win a race in the class and finished the season seventh overall. She was fourth in 2019 with six podiums and two wins.

Unable to compete in the Suzuka 4 Hours Endurance Race in 2018 due to injuries, Sarapuech won the race in 2019, being the first female to do so. The race was held in heavy rain and due to treacherous conditions was shortened to 2 hours 40 minutes.

Sarapuech was confirmed to race in the SuperSports 600cc class of the 2020 ARRC for AP Honda Racing Thailand. However, due to the COVID-19 pandemic, racing was suspended in 2020 and 2021. When racing returned in 2022 Sarapuech competed 2 races in the SS600 class of the ARRC. Returning to the AP250 class in 2023 she finished the season 5th.

=== WorldWCR ===
The EEST NJT Racing Team contacted Sarapuech in January 2026 with an offer to race for them in WorldWCR. However, the entry list for 2026 was already closed. Organisers Dorna were keen to have an Asian rider in the series so allowed her to ride as a wildcard.

Sarapuech also completed in the ESBK (Spanish Superbikes) Yamaha R7 Cup in 2026.

== Career statistics ==
=== Asia Talent Cup ===
(key) (Races in bold indicate pole position; races in italics indicate fastest lap)

Year	1	2	3	4	5	6	7	8	9	Position	Pts
2014	QAT; Ret	IND; 20	CHN; 12	CHN; 10	MAL; 12	MAL; 9	JAP; Ret	MAL; 5	MAL; Ret	15th	32

=== Asia Dream Cup ===
(key) (Races in bold indicate pole position; races in italics indicate fastest lap)

Year	Bike	1	2	3	4	5	6	7	8	9	10	11	12	Position	Pts
2015	Honda	SEP1; 3	SEP2; 1	SEN1; 1	SEN2; 2	SUZ1; 1	SUZ2; 13	BUR1; 1	BUR2 ?	LOS1; 1	LOS2 ?	BUR1; 3	BUR2; 5	1st	213.5

=== Asia Production 250 ===
(key) (Races in bold indicate pole position; races in italics indicate fastest lap)

Year	Bike	1	2	3	4	5	6	7	8	9	10	11	12	13	14	Position	Pts
2016	Honda	JOH1	JOH2	BUR1	BUR2	SUZ1	SUZ2	SEN1	SEN2	BUD1	BUD2	BUR1; 15	BUR2; 21			36th	1
2017	Honda	JOH1; 15	JOH2; 17	BUR1; DNS	BUR2; DNS	SUZ1; 5	SUZ2; 8	SEN1; 10	SEN2; 19	MAD1; 4	MAD2; 6	BUR1; 8	BUR2; 8			10th	65
2018	Honda	BUR1; 10	BUR2; 1	BEN1; 5	BEN2; 7	SUZ1; 5	SUZ2; Ret	MAD1	MAD2	SEN1; 4	SEN2; 5	BUR1; DSQ	BUR2; DNS			7th	86
2019	Honda	**SEP1**; Ret	**SEP2**; 1	BEN1; 3	BEN2; 2	**BUR1**; 1	**BUR2**; Ret	SUZ1; 5	SUZ2; Ret	ZHU1; 6	ZHU2; Ret	**SEP1**; 2	**SEP2**; Ret	**BUR1**; 3	**BUR2**; Ret	4th	143
2023	Honda	CHA1; 4	CHA2; 3	SEP1; Ret	SEP2; 11	SUG1; 2	SUG2; Ret	MAN1; 21	MAN2; Ret	ZHU1; 1	ZHU2; 6	CHA1; 3	CHA2; 3			5th	121

=== Asia Supersports 600 ===
(key) (Races in bold indicate pole position; races in italics indicate fastest lap)

Year	Bike	1	2	3	4	5	6	7	8	9	10	Position	Pts
2022	Honda	CHA1	CHA2	SEP1	SEP2	SUG1; 10	SUG2; 5	SEP1	SEP2	CHA1	CHA2	17th	17

=== WorldWCR ===
(key) (Races in bold indicate pole position; races in italics indicate fastest lap)

Year	Bike	1	2	3	4	5	6	7	8	9	10	11	12	Position	Pts
2026	Yamaha YZF-R7	POR1; 11	POR2; 10	ASS1; 5	ASS2; 5	BAL1; 5	BAL2; 4	MIS1; 7	MIS2; 3	DON1; 3	DON2; Ret	JER1; 9	JER2; 7	6th	115

=== ESBK Yamaha R7 Cup ===
(key) (Races in bold indicate pole position; races in italics indicate fastest lap)

Year	1	2	3	4	5	6	7	8	9	10	Position	Pts
2026	NAV1; 4	NAV2; 5	EST1; 5	EST2; 3	ARA1	ARA2	VAL1	VAL2	NAV1	NAV2	5th*	51*

* Season still in progress
