= 2019 Asia Road Racing Championship =

24th season Asia Road Racing Championship

2019 Asia Road Racing Championship
| Previous: | 2018 | Next: | 2020 |

The 2019 Idemitsu FIM Asia Road Racing Championship was the 24th season of the Asia Road Racing Championship. The season started on 8 March at Sepang International Circuit in Malaysia and ended on 29 November at Chang International Circuit.The Season was also marked by the death of 16 years old Philippines rider Amber Garcia.

== Calendar and results ==
The Provisional calendar was published in November 2018. In June 2019 it was announced that the Zhuhai International Circuit was added to the calendar as round 5 of the Asia Road Racing Championship replacing the Korea International Circuit round.

| Round | Circuit | Date | ASB1000 Winners | SS600 Winners | AP250 Winners | UB150 Winners |
|---|---|---|---|---|---|---|
| 1 | (Malaysia) Sepang International Circuit | 8–10 March | R1: (Malaysia) Azlan Shah Kamaruzaman | R1: (Thailand) Peerapong Boonlert | R1: (Indonesia) Lucky Hendriansya | R1: (Philippines) McKinley Kyle Paz |
| 1 | (Malaysia) Sepang International Circuit | 8–10 March | R2: (Malaysia) Zaqhwan Zaidi | R2: (Thailand) Peerapong Boonlert | R2: (Thailand) Muklada Sarapuech | R2: (Philippines) Fernando Masato |
| 2 | (Australia) The Bend Motorsport Park | 24–28 April | R1: (Australia) Bryan Staring | R1: (Thailand) Peerapong Boonlert | R1: (Indonesia) Andy Muhammad Fadly | Not Participate |
| 2 | (Australia) The Bend Motorsport Park | 24–28 April | R2: (Australia) Broc Parkes | R2: (Thailand) Peerapong Boonlert | R2: (Japan) Aiki Iyoshi | Not Participate |
| 3 | (Thailand) Chang International Circuit | 31 May-2 June | R1: (Malaysia) Azlan Shah Kamaruzaman | R1: (Thailand) Peerapong Boonlert | R1: (Thailand) Muklada Sarapuech | R1: (Malaysia) Akid Aziz |
| 3 | (Thailand) Chang International Circuit | 31 May-2 June | R2: (Malaysia) Azlan Shah Kamaruzaman | R2: (Thailand) Peerapong Boonlert | R2: (Thailand) Tatchakorn Buasri | R2: (Malaysia) Ahmad Fazli Sham |
| 4 | (Japan) Suzuka Circuit | 28–30 June | R1: (Australia) Broc Parkes | R1: (Japan) Soichiro Minamimoto | R1: (Indonesia) Andy Muhammad Fadly | R1: (Indonesia) Gupita Kresna Wardhana |
| 4 | (Japan) Suzuka Circuit | 28–30 June | R2: (Japan) Shinichi Nakatomi | R2: (Thailand) Peerapong Boonlert | R2: (Indonesia) Awhin Sanjaya | R2: (Indonesia) Aldi Satya Mahendra |
| 5 | (China) Zhuhai International Circuit | 9–11 August | R1: (Malaysia) Zaqhwan Zaidi | R1: (Malaysia) Adam Norrodin | R1: (Indonesia) Rafid Topan Sucipto | R1: (Philippines) McKinley Kyle Paz |
| 5 | (China) Zhuhai International Circuit | 9–11 August | R2: (Australia) Broc Parkes | R2: (Malaysia) Kasma Daniel | R2: (Indonesia) Rafid Topan Sucipto | R2: (Malaysia) Akid Aziz |
| 6 | (Malaysia) Sepang International Circuit | 20–22 September | R1: (Malaysia) Azlan Shah Kamaruzaman | R1: (Malaysia) Ramdan Rosli | R1: (Indonesia) Irfan Ardiansyah | R1: (Malaysia) Akid Aziz |
| 6 | (Malaysia) Sepang International Circuit | 20–22 September | R2: (Malaysia) Azlan Shah Kamaruzaman | R2: (Thailand) Peerapong Boonlert | R2: (Indonesia) Awhin Sanjaya | R2: (Malaysia) Haziq Fairues |
| 7 | (Thailand) Chang International Circuit | 29 November-1 December | R1: (Malaysia) Zaqhwan Zaidi | R1: (Malaysia) Adam Norrodin | R1: (Indonesia) Andy Muhammad Fadly | R1: (Malaysia) Ahmad Fazli Sham |
| 7 | (Thailand) Chang International Circuit | 29 November-1 December | R2: (Malaysia) Azlan Shah Kamaruzaman | R2: (Malaysia) Kasma Daniel | R2: (Thailand) Piyawat Patoomyos | R2: (Indonesia) Richard Richie Taroreh |

== Teams and riders ==
Key
Regular rider
Wildcard rider
Replacement rider

2019 ASB1000 Entry List
| Team | Constructor | No. | Rider | Rounds |
|---|---|---|---|---|
| ONEXOX TKKR SAG Team | BMW | 12 | (Indonesia) Ali Adrian Rusmiputro | 4–7 |
| ONEXOX TKKR SAG Team | BMW | 25 | (Malaysia) Azlan Shah Kamaruzaman | All |
| ONEXOX TKKR SAG Team | BMW | 83 | (Malaysia) Farid Badrul Hisham | 1–3 |
| FTA Liqui Moly Racing Team | BMW | 28 | (Malaysia) Shahrulnizam Ramli | 6 |
| Teramoto@J-Trip Racing | BMW | 52 | (Japan) Koji Teramoto | 4 |
| Access Plus Racing Ducati Philippines Essenza Team | Ducati | 15 | (Italy) Federico Sandi | 6–7 |
| Access Plus Racing Ducati Philippines Essenza Team | Ducati | 48 | (Switzerland) Jonathan Serrapica | 1–6 |
| Access Plus Racing Ducati Philippines Essenza Team | Ducati | 77 | (Philippines) TJ Alberto | All |
| HONDA Asia Dream Racing With SHOWA | Honda | 21 | (Malaysia) Zaqhwan Zaidi | All |
| Titanic Kawasaki Team | Kawasaki | 17 | (Canada) Robert Daniel Kruger | 5 |
| Kawasaki Thailand Racing Team | Kawasaki | 29 | (Thailand) Chaiwichit Nisakul | All |
| Kawasaki Thailand Racing Team | Kawasaki | 60 | (Australia) Bryan Staring | 2–4 |
| Kawasaki Thailand Racing Team | Kawasaki | 100 | (Thailand) Thitipong Warokorn | 1, 5–7 |
| Aark Racing | Kawasaki | 53 | (Australia) Mason Coote | 2 |
| Speedmaster Racing & RS ITOH | Kawasaki | 71 | (Japan) Masahiro Shinjo | 5 |
| Webike Trickstar Victor Racing | Kawasaki | 91 | (Belgium) Bastien Mackels | 4 |
| DB Racing Services | Kawasaki | 333 | (Australia) Yannis Shaw | 2 |
| Victor Racing Team | Yamaha | 18 | (Japan) Kazuma Tsuda | 2–4, 6 |
| Victor Racing Team | Yamaha | 22 | (Australia) Lachlan Epis | 7 |
| Victor Racing Team | Yamaha | 33 | (Indonesia) Ahmad Yudhistira | All |
| Victor Racing Team | Yamaha | 61 | (Indonesia) Ferlando Herdian | 5 |
| Victor Racing Team | Yamaha | 67 | (India) Rajini Krishnan | 1 |
| Yamaha Racing Team ASEAN | Yamaha | 23 | (Australia) Broc Parkes | All |
| Yamaha Racing Team ASEAN | Yamaha | 76 | (Japan) Yuuki Ito | All |
| Yamaha Thailand Racing Team | Yamaha | 24 | (Thailand) Apiwat Wongthananon | All |
| Yamaha Thailand Racing Team | Yamaha | 56 | (Thailand) Ratthapong Wilairot | All |
| Yamaha MAN LEE TAT Racing Team | Yamaha | 26 | (China) Li Zheng Peng | 5 |
| Addicted To Track | Yamaha | 49 | (Australia) Stephane Redman | 2 |
| Hitman RC-Koushien Yamaha | Yamaha | 85 | (Japan) Shinichi Nakatomi | 4 |
| China Yamaha MAXpeedingrods Racing Team | Yamaha | 90 | (China) Huang Zi Zhao | 5 |
| DML 97 Racing Team | Yamaha | 97 | (China) Chen Peng Yuan | 5 |
| YSS China | Yamaha | 116 | (Australia) Mark Aitchison | 5 |
2019 SS600 Entry List
| Team | Constructor | No. | Rider | Rounds |
| Team MF & Kawasaki | Kawasaki | 57 | (Japan) Kyosuke Okuda | 4 |
| Hanshin Riding School + Nankai | Kawasaki | 98 | (Japan) Katsuto Sano | 4 |
| TS Kawasaki Racing Team | Kawasaki | 99 | (Macau) Ao Leong Fu | 5 |
| TS Kawasaki Racing Team | Kawasaki | 222 | (China) Sha Juntong | 5 |
| Musashi Boon Siew HONDA Racing Team | Honda | 20 | (Malaysia) Azroy Hakeem Anuar | All |
| Musashi Boon Siew HONDA Racing Team | Honda | 634 | (Malaysia) Helmi Azman | All |
| ASTRA HONDA Racing Team | Honda | 25 | (Indonesia) Rheza Danica Ahrens | All |
| ASTRA HONDA Racing Team | Honda | 27 | (Indonesia) Andi Farid Izdihar | All |
| A.P. HONDA Racing Team | Honda | 35 | (Thailand) Kritchaporn Kaewsonthi | All |
| A.P. HONDA Racing Team | Honda | 123 | (Thailand) Passawit Thitivararak | All |
| YUZY Honda Racing Team | Honda | 36 | (Philippines) TJ Alberto | 1 |
| Motobum Honda | Honda | 54 | (Japan) Kohta Arakawa | 4 |
| Wuyang Honda Racing Team | Honda | 95 | (China) Chen Yuan Hang | 5 |
| Battle Factory | Honda | 97 | (Japan) Yuto Sano | 4 |
| Hong Leong YAMAHA Malaysia | Yamaha | 13 | (Malaysia) Akid Aziz | 2 |
| Hong Leong YAMAHA Malaysia | Yamaha | 50 | (Malaysia) Ahmad Afif Amran | All |
| Hong Leong YAMAHA Malaysia | Yamaha | 127 | (Malaysia) Kasma Daniel | 1, 3–6 |
| FS D Racing | Yamaha | 16 | (China) Ou Jin Bin | 5 |
| Speed Heart DogFightR RPM Yamaha | Yamaha | 18 | (Japan) Rei Toshima | 4 |
| JIM777Y Racing Team | Yamaha | 19 | (China) Chen Hong Yan | 5 |
| China Yamaha MAXpeedingrods Racing Team | Yamaha | 21 | (China) Ma Sai | 3–7 |
| Akenospeed-Yamaha | Yamaha | 22 | (Japan) Soichiro Minamimoto | 4 |
| OXEXOX TKKR SAG Team | Yamaha | 23 | (Malaysia) Ramdan Rosli | 1, 3–6 |
| OXEXOX TKKR SAG Team | Yamaha | 81 | (Malaysia) Fakhrusy Syakirin Rostam | All |
| OXEXOX TKKR SAG Team | Yamaha | 87 | (Malaysia) Nazirul Izzat Bahauddin | 7 |
| OXEXOX TKKR SAG Team | Yamaha | 93 | (Malaysia) Khairul Ikhwan Ajis | 2 |
| SIC Junior ZK Racing | Yamaha | 24 | (Malaysia) Izam Ikmal | 6 |
| SIC Junior ZK Racing | Yamaha | 66 | (Malaysia) Ibrahim Norrodin | 2 |
| SIC Junior ZK Racing | Yamaha | 77 | (Malaysia) Adam Norrodin | 1, 3–5, 7 |
| Yamaha Thailand Racing Team | Yamaha | 26 | (Thailand) Peerapong Boonlert | All |
| Victor Racing Team | Yamaha | 37 | (New Zealand) Liam Taylor MacDonald | All |
| Victor Racing Team | Yamaha | 69 | (Spain) Javier Orellana Malloy | 2–7 |
2019 AP250 Entry List
| Team | Constructor | No. | Rider | Rounds |
| ASTRA HONDA Racing Team | Honda | 12 | (Indonesia) Lucky Hendriansya | All |
| ASTRA HONDA Racing Team | Honda | 16 | (Indonesia) Irfan Ardiansyah | All |
| ASTRA HONDA Racing Team | Honda | 198 | (Indonesia) Awhin Sanjaya | All |
| Idemitsu Boon Siew Honda Racing | Honda | 19 | (Malaysia) Idlan Haqimi | 6 |
| Idemitsu Boon Siew Honda Racing | Honda | 63 | (Malaysia) Syarifuddin Azman | 6 |
| Idemitsu HONDA Racing India | Honda | 18 | (India) Senthil Chandrasekaran | All |
| Idemitsu HONDA Racing India | Honda | 80 | (India) Sethu Rajiv | All |
| TEAM TEC-2 | Honda | 20 | (Japan) Yuta Kasai | 4 |
| TEAM TEC-2 | Honda | 91 | (Japan) Shunya Mori | 4 |
| ATJ Racing with NMC | Honda | 31 | (Japan) Kazuki Tomita | 4 |
| Team KYOEI Go&Fun | Honda | 35 | (Japan) Nobuteru Sasaki | 4 |
| A.P. HONDA Racing Thailand | Honda | 44 | (Thailand) Muklada Sarapuech | All |
| A.P. HONDA Racing Thailand | Honda | 149 | (Thailand) Tatchakorn Buasri | 2–7 |
| A.P. HONDA Racing Thailand | Honda | 188 | (Thailand) Piyawat Patoomyos | 2–7 |
| Yuzy HONDA Racing | Honda | 61 | (Malaysia) Sharon Shazras Yuzy | 1–4, 6–7 |
| HONDA Racing Vietnam | Honda | 65 | (Vietnam) Cao Viet Nam | All |
| United Oil Y-Teq Liberty Racing | Honda | 81 | (Japan) Mui Nakahara | 3–7 |
| United Oil Y-Teq Liberty Racing | Honda | 888 | (Chinese Taipei) Chiou Ke-Lung | 1–2 |
| Wuyang Honda Racing Team | Honda | 98 | (China) Zhao Sheng Jun Jie | 5 |
| Bike Corner SYS KYT Racing Team | Honda | 911 | (Indonesia) Rafid Topan Sucipto | All |
| BRP Racing | Kawasaki | 22 | (Thailand) Kevin Johnson | All |
| BRP Racing | Kawasaki | 29 | (Thailand) Stewart Johnson | All |
| SIC Junior ZK Racing | Kawasaki | 24 | (Malaysia) Izam Ikmal | 1, 3–5 |
| SIC Junior ZK Racing | Kawasaki | 26 | (Malaysia) Sharul Ezwan Sharil | 1–2 |
| SIC Junior ZK Racing | Kawasaki | 78 | (Malaysia) Muhammad Idil Fitri Mahadi | 6–7 |
| SIC Junior ZK Racing | Kawasaki | 99 | (Malaysia) Harith Haziq Zamri | 3–7 |
| Manual Tech KYT Kawasaki Racing | Kawasaki | 37 | (Japan) Aiki Iyoshi | All |
| Manual Tech KYT Kawasaki Racing | Kawasaki | 108 | (Indonesia) Andy Muhammad Fadly | All |
| YSS *ANDO Racing Mercury | Kawasaki | 38 | (Japan) Keiji Goto | 4 |
| Horizon Racing Team | Kawasaki | 47 | (Malaysia) Allan Harris Herman | 1 |
| 31 Racing | TVS | 23 | (India) KY Ahmed | 7 |
| 31 Racing | TVS | 30 | (India) Jagan Kumar | 7 |
| 31 Racing | TVS | 73 | (Japan) Hikari Okubo | 7 |
| Aracer 31Racing | Yamaha | 11 | (Chinese Taipei) Chih Ying Chiang | 6–7 |
| Speed Heart DogFightR RPM Yamaha | Yamaha | 13 | (Japan) Otojirou Tanimoto | 4 |
| Victor Racing Team | Yamaha | 15 | (Hong Kong) Leong Nang Tse | 6 |
| Bike Corner SYS KYT Racing Team | Yamaha | 33 | (Chinese Taipei) Liu Junmei | All |
| YAMAHA Racing Indonesia | Yamaha | 36 | (Indonesia) M. Faerozi | All |
| YAMAHA Racing Indonesia | Yamaha | 96 | (Indonesia) Anggi Setiawan | All |
| YAMAHA Thailand Racing Team | Yamaha | 56 | (Thailand) Sawapol Lilabong | All |
| YAMAHA Thailand Racing Team | Yamaha | 86 | (Thailand) Suttipat Patchaeetron | All |
| ONEXOX TKKR SAG Team | Yamaha | 88 | (Malaysia) Nazirul Izzat Bahauddin | 1–6 |
| ONEXOX TKKR SAG Team | Yamaha | 92 | (Malaysia) Muzakkir Mohamed | All |
| ONEXOX TKKR SAG Team | Yamaha | 222 | (Indonesia) Reynaldo Ratukore | All |
| Yamaha Hispeed Racing Team | Yamaha | 146 | (Thailand) Vorapong Malahuan | 7 |
2019 UB150 Entry List
| Team | Constructor | No. | Rider | Rounds |
| HI REV SCK HONDA Racing Team | Honda | 14 | (Malaysia) Afzan Supaat | 6 |
| HI REV SCK HONDA Racing Team | Honda | 16 | (Malaysia) Afiq Asyraf Zulkifli | 1 |
| HI REV SCK HONDA Racing Team | Honda | 19 | (Malaysia) Idlan Haqimi | 4 |
| HI REV SCK HONDA Racing Team | Honda | 31 | (Australia) Travis Hall | 1, 3, 6 |
| HI REV SCK HONDA Racing Team | Honda | 43 | (Japan) Gun Mie | 1, 3–4 7 |
| HI REV SCK HONDA Racing Team | Honda | 53 | (Indonesia) Rizal Ferayadi | 6–7 |
| HI REV SCK HONDA Racing Team | Honda | 59 | (Malaysia) Azrulaffendi Hadi | 1 |
| HI REV SCK HONDA Racing Team | Honda | 78 | (Malaysia) Fadlyshah Redzuan | 5 |
| HI REV SCK HONDA Racing Team | Honda | 87 | (Malaysia) Syarifuddin Azman | 5 |
| HI REV SCK HONDA Racing Team | Honda | 93 | (Malaysia) Luth Harith Erwan | 3 |
| SND Factory Racing Rapido | Honda | 38 | (Indonesia) Wawan Wello | 1, 3–7 |
| HONDA Racing Vietnam | Honda | 48 | (Vietnam) Le Khanh Loc | 1, 3 |
| HONDA Racing Vietnam | Honda | 99 | (Vietnam) Nguyen Vu Thanh | 1, 3–6 |
| HONDA Racing Vietnam | Honda | 178 | (Vietnam) Nguyen Anh Tuan | 7 |
| HONDA Racing Vietnam | Honda | 193 | (Vietnam) Nguyen Duc Thanh | 4–7 |
| Yuzy HONDA Racing | Honda | 63 | (Malaysia) Harith Farhan Baharin | 1 |
| Yuzy HONDA Racing | Honda | 76 | (Malaysia) Amirul Ariff Musa | 1, 3–7 |
| Yuzy HONDA Racing | Honda | 81 | (Malaysia) Aiman Azman | 1, 3–6 |
| 4S1M Yamaha Racing Team | Yamaha | 22 | (Philippines) John Emerson Inguito | 6 |
| Aira YDJ14 The Strokes 55 | Yamaha | 219 | (Indonesia) Nurjabad Fahnisyar | 7 |
| United Oil Y-TEQ Liberty Racing | Yamaha | 11 | (Malaysia) Ahmad Fazrul Sham | 6 |
| United Oil Y-TEQ Liberty Racing | Yamaha | 21 | (Malaysia) Iqbal Abdul Malek | 5–7 |
| United Oil Y-TEQ Liberty Racing | Yamaha | 33 | (Malaysia) Khairil Hisham | 1, 3, 5–7 |
| United Oil Y-TEQ Liberty Racing | Yamaha | 69 | (Indonesia) Agung Fachrul | 1, 3–5 |
| UMA Racing YAMAHA Maju Motor Asia Team | Yamaha | 13 | (Malaysia) Akid Aziz | 1, 3–7 |
| UMA Racing YAMAHA Maju Motor Asia Team | Yamaha | 27 | (Malaysia) Haziq Fairues | 1, 3–7 |
| UMA Racing YAMAHA Maju Motor Asia Team | Yamaha | 136 | (Malaysia) Syafiq Rosli | 6 |
| UMA Racing Yamaha Philippine Team | Yamaha | 16 | (Philippines) Amber Garcia | 7 |
| UMA Racing Yamaha Philippine Team | Yamaha | 17 | (Philippines) Fernando Masato | 1, 3–7 |
| UMA Racing Yamaha Philippine Team | Yamaha | 123 | (Philippines) McKinley Kyle Paz | 1, 3–7 |
| RCB ACCENTWIRE YAMAHA YYPANG Racing Team | Yamaha | 18 | (Malaysia) Adib Rosley | 1, 3–5, 7 |
| RCB ACCENTWIRE YAMAHA YYPANG Racing Team | Yamaha | 68 | (Malaysia) Fareez Afeez | 1 |
| RCB ACCENTWIRE YAMAHA YYPANG Racing Team | Yamaha | 88 | (Malaysia) Azhar Abdul Jalil | 6 |
| RCB ACCENTWIRE YAMAHA YYPANG Racing Team | Yamaha | 98 | (Malaysia) Izzat Zaidi | 1, 3–7 |
| RCB ACCENTWIRE YAMAHA YYPANG Racing Team | Yamaha | 118 | (Malaysia) Amirul Affirudin | 6 |
| SND Factory Racing Team | Yamaha | 23 | (Indonesia) Gupita Kresna Wardhana | 1, 3–7 |
| SND Factory Racing Team | Yamaha | 199 | (Indonesia) Syahrul Amin | 1, 3–7 |
| Team One For All | Yamaha | 24 | (Thailand) Peerapong Luiboonpeng | 1, 3–7 |
| Team One For All | Yamaha | 36 | (Malaysia) Affendi Rosli | 1, 3–7 |
| ONEXOX TKKR SAG Team | Yamaha | 28 | (Malaysia) Hafiza Rofa | 1, 3, 6–7 |
| ONEXOX TKKR SAG Team | Yamaha | 42 | (Malaysia) Izzat Raduan | 4–5 |
| ONEXOX TKKR SAG Team | Yamaha | 46 | (Malaysia) Ahmad Fazli Sham | 1, 3–7 |
| ONEXOX TKKR SAG Team | Yamaha | 57 | (Malaysia) Faiz Zekri Sabri | 1, 3–7 |
| ONEXOX TKKR SAG Team | Yamaha | 60 | (Indonesia) Wahyu Aji Trilaksana | 1, 3–7 |
| Cardinals Racing Team | Yamaha | 69 | (Indonesia) Agung Fachrul | 6 |
| Cardinals Racing Team | Yamaha | 79 | (Malaysia) Fitri Ashraff Razali | 1, 3–7 |
| Cardinals Racing Team | Yamaha | 97 | (Malaysia) Rozaiman Said | 1, 3–7 |
| Cardinals Racing Team | Yamaha | 272 | (Indonesia) Chepy Armansyah | 1 |
| YAMAHA Racing Indonesia | Yamaha | 89 | (Indonesia) Wahyu Nugroho | 1, 3–7 |
| YAMAHA Racing Indonesia | Yamaha | 570 | (Indonesia) Aldi Satya Mahendra | 1, 3–7 |
| ProLiner 549 KABOCHI Racing Team | Yamaha | 157 | (Indonesia) Murobbil Vitoni | 1, 3–7 |
| ProLiner 549 KABOCHI Racing Team | Yamaha | 179 | (Indonesia) Richard Tatoteh | 1, 3–7 |
| Seruyan Jaya RRS CArgloss Racetech | Yamaha | 177 | (Indonesia) Aditya Fauzi | 7 |

== Championship standings ==
Points

| Position | **1st** | **2nd** | **3rd** | **4th** | **5th** | **6th** | **7th** | **8th** | **9th** | **10th** | **11th** | **12th** | **13th** | **14th** | **15th** |
| Points | 25 | 20 | 16 | 13 | 11 | 10 | 9 | 8 | 7 | 6 | 5 | 4 | 3 | 2 | 1 |

=== Riders standings ===
==== Asia Superbike 1000 ====
| Pos. | Rider | Bike | SEP (Malaysia) | | BEN (Australia) | | BUR (Thailand) | | SUZ (Japan) | | ZHU (China) | | SEP (Malaysia) | | BUR (Thailand) | | Pts |
| Pos. | Rider | Bike | R1 | R2 | R1 | R2 | R1 | R2 | R1 | R2 | R1 | R2 | R1 | R2 | R1 | R2 | Pts |
|---|---|---|---|---|---|---|---|---|---|---|---|---|---|---|---|---|---|
| 1 | (Malaysia) Azlan Shah Kamaruzaman | BMW | 1 | Ret | 5 | 5 | **1** | **1** | 3 | 6 | Ret | 2 | 1 | 1 | 2 | 1 | 238 |
| 2 | (Australia) Broc Parkes | Yamaha | 3 | 5 | **2** | **1** | 4 | 2 | 1 | 2 | **4** | **1** | **4** | **5** | 12 | 7 | 225 |
| 3 | (Malaysia) Zaqhwan Zaidi | Honda | Ret | 1 | 4 | 4 | 2 | 4 | **2** | **5** | 1 | 4 | Ret | 4 | **1** | **2** | 211 |
| 4 | (Thailand) Apiwat Wongthananon | Yamaha | 5 | 4 | 6 | 6 | 3 | 3 | 4 | 8 | 5 | Ret | 3 | 3 | 8 | 4 | 161 |
| 5 | (Japan) Yuuki Ito | Yamaha | Ret | 3 | 3 | 3 | 5 | 6 | 6 | 3 | 2 | 3 | Ret | 6 | 5 | 8 | 160 |
| 6 | (Thailand) Thitipong Warokorn | Kawasaki | **2** | **2** | | | | | | | 3 | 5 | 2 | 2 | 3 | 3 | 139 |
| 7 | (Thailand) Ratthapong Wilairot | Yamaha | 9 | 7 | 7 | 7 | 6 | 8 | 7 | 4 | 10 | 8 | 6 | 8 | 6 | Ret | 116 |
| 8 | (Indonesia) Ahmad Yudhistira | Yamaha | 4 | Ret | 8 | 8 | 8 | 5 | Ret | 7 | 6 | 7 | Ret | Ret | Ret | 9 | 83 |
| 9 | (Australia) Bryan Staring | Kawasaki | | | 1 | 2 | 7 | 7 | 5 | 11 | | | | | | | 79 |
| 10 | (Thailand) Chaiwichit Nisakul | Kawasaki | Ret | Ret | 9 | 9 | DNS | DNS | 11 | 10 | 8 | 9 | 7 | 9 | 4 | 6 | 79 |
| 11 | (Philippines) TJ Alberto | Ducati | 7 | 6 | 11 | Ret | 9 | 10 | 12 | 13 | 12 | 13 | Ret | 11 | 9 | 10 | 69 |
| 12 | (Italy) Federico Sandi | Ducati | | | | | | | | | | | 5 | 7 | 7 | 5 | 40 |
| 13 | (Malaysia) Farid Badrul Hisham | BMW | 6 | Ret | 10 | 10 | 10 | 9 | | | | | | | | | 35 |
| 14 | (Japan) Kazuma Tsuda | Yamaha | | | 12 | Ret | 11 | 11 | 10 | 9 | | | 8 | Ret | | | 35 |
| 15 | (Japan) Shinichi Nakatomi | Yamaha | | | | | | | 9 | 1 | | | | | | | 32 |
| 16 | (Indonesia) Ali Adrian Rusmiputro | BMW | | | | | | | 13 | DNS | 13 | 15 | 9 | 10 | 11 | 11 | 30 |
| 17 | (Switzerland) Jonathan Serrapica | Ducati | 8 | Ret | 14 | 13 | 12 | 12 | 14 | 15 | 16 | 17 | Ret | 13 | | | 27 |
| 18 | (China) Li Zheng Peng | Yamaha | | | | | | | | | 7 | 10 | | | | | 15 |
| 19 | (Belgium) Bastien Mackels | Kawasaki | | | | | | | 8 | 12 | | | | | | | 12 |
| 20 | (China) Huang Zi Zhao | Yamaha | | | | | | | | | 9 | 11 | | | | | 12 |
| 21 | (Australia) Mark Aitchison | Yamaha | | | | | | | | | DNS | 6 | | | | | 10 |
| 22 | (Malaysia) Shahrulnizam Ramli | BMW | | | | | | | | | | | 10 | 12 | | | 10 |
| 23 | (Japan) Masahiro Shinjo | Kawasaki | | | | | | | | | 11 | 12 | | | | | 9 |
| 24 | (India) Rajini Krishnan | Yamaha | Ret | 8 | | | | | | | | | | | | | 8 |
| 25 | (Australia) Yannis Shaw | Kawasaki | | | 13 | 11 | | | | | | | | | | | 8 |
| 26 | (Australia) Lachlan Epis | Yamaha | | | | | | | | | | | | | 10 | Ret | 6 |
| 27 | (Australia) Stephanie Redman | Yamaha | | | DNS | 12 | | | | | | | | | | | 4 |
| 28 | (Canada) Robert Daniel Kruger | Kawasaki | | | | | | | | | 14 | 14 | | | | | 4 |
| 29 | (Japan) Koji Teramoto | BMW | | | | | | | Ret | 14 | | | | | | | 2 |
| 30 | (China) Chen Peng Yuan | Yamaha | | | | | | | | | 15 | 18 | | | | | 1 |
| 31 | (Indonesia) Ferlando Herdian | Yamaha | | | | | | | | | DNS | 16 | | | | | 0 |
| | (Australia) Mason Coote | Kawasaki | | | WD | WD | | | | | | | | | | | 0 |

| Colour | Result |
|---|---|
| Gold | Winner |
| Silver | Second place |
| Bronze | Third place |
| Green | Points classification |
| Blue | Non-points classification |
| Blue | Non-classified finish (NC) |
| Purple | Retired, not classified (Ret) |
| Red | Did not qualify (DNQ) |
| Red | Did not pre-qualify (DNPQ) |
| Black | Disqualified (DSQ) |
| White | Did not start (DNS) |
| White | Withdrew (WD) |
| White | Race cancelled (C) |
| Blank | Did not practice (DNP) |
| Blank | Did not arrive (DNA) |
| Blank | Excluded (EX) |

**Bold** – Pole position
Italics – Fastest lap

==== Supersport 600 ====
| Pos. | Rider | Bike | SEP (Malaysia) | | BEN (Australia) | | BUR (Thailand) | | SUZ (Japan) | | ZHU (China) | | SEP (Malaysia) | | BUR (Thailand) | | Pts |
| Pos. | Rider | Bike | R1 | R2 | R1 | R2 | R1 | R2 | R1 | R2 | R1 | R2 | R1 | R2 | R1 | R2 | Pts |
|---|---|---|---|---|---|---|---|---|---|---|---|---|---|---|---|---|---|
| 1 | (Thailand) Peerapong Boonlert | Yamaha | 1 | 1 | 1 | 1 | **1** | **1** | **3** | **1** | 3 | 3 | 3 | 1 | 2 | 3 | 300 |
| 2 | (Malaysia) Kasma Daniel | Yamaha | 2 | 3 | | | 4 | 3 | 2 | 4 | **2** | **1** | **2** | **2** | **3** | **1** | 224 |
| 3 | (Malaysia) Adam Norrodin | Yamaha | **3** | **4** | | | 2 | 2 | 5 | Ret | 1 | 2 | | | 1 | 2 | 170 |
| 4 | (Malaysia) Azroy Hakeem Anuar | Honda | 4 | 7 | 3 | 5 | 6 | 6 | Ret | Ret | Ret | 4 | 4 | 5 | 7 | 6 | 125 |
| 5 | (Indonesia) Andi Farid Izdihar | Honda | Ret | 2 | 7 | 2 | 5 | 5 | 15 | 5 | Ret | 15 | Ret | 6 | 6 | 5 | 115 |
| 6 | (Thailand) Passawit Thitivararak | Honda | Ret | 9 | 6 | 7 | 7 | Ret | 10 | 7 | 6 | 5 | 6 | 9 | 5 | 7 | 108 |
| 7 | (Malaysia) Helmi Azman | Honda | 5 | 5 | Ret | 6 | 9 | 8 | 11 | 10 | 5 | 6 | 5 | 14 | 10 | 9 | 105 |
| 8 | (Malaysia) Ahmad Afif Amran | Yamaha | 9 | Ret | 5 | 4 | 8 | 7 | 7 | Ret | 4 | Ret | Ret | 7 | 4 | 4 | 105 |
| 9 | (Malaysia) Ramdan Rosli | Yamaha | 6 | 6 | | | 3 | 4 | Ret | Ret | Ret | DNS | 1 | 3 | | | 90 |
| 10 | (Spain) Javier Orellana Malloy | Yamaha | | | 2 | Ret | 14 | 10 | 14 | 11 | 8 | 9 | 7 | 13 | 8 | 8 | 78 |
| 11 | (Indonesia) Rheza Danica Ahrens | Honda | 8 | 10 | 8 | 8 | 10 | Ret | 8 | 12 | 10 | 7 | Ret | 8 | 14 | 11 | 78 |
| 12 | (Thailand) Kritchaporn Kaewsonthi | Honda | 7 | 8 | 9 | Ret | 11 | Ret | 9 | 14 | 13 | 8 | 8 | 11 | Ret | 10 | 68 |
| 13 | (Malaysia) Fakhrusy Syakirin Rostam | Yamaha | Ret | 11 | 10 | 9 | 12 | 9 | 13 | 13 | DNS | DNS | 10 | 10 | 13 | 14 | 52 |
| 14 | (Japan) Soichiro Minamimoto | Yamaha | | | | | | | 1 | 3 | | | | | | | 41 |
| 15 | (China) Ma Sai | Yamaha | | | | | 13 | 11 | 17 | 16 | 9 | 10 | 12 | 12 | 12 | 13 | 36 |
| 16 | (New Zealand) Liam Taylor MacDonald | Yamaha | 10 | 12 | 13 | 11 | Ret | 12 | 16 | 17 | DNS | 14 | 11 | Ret | 11 | Ret | 34 |
| 17 | (Japan) Kyusuke Okude | Kawasaki | | | | | | | 6 | 2 | | | | | | | 30 |
| 18 | (Malaysia) Ibrahim Norrodin | Yamaha | | | **4** | **3** | | | | | | | | | | | 29 |
| 19 | (Japan) Yuta Sano | Honda | | | | | | | 4 | 6 | | | | | | | 23 |
| 20 | (Malaysia) Izam Ikmal | Yamaha | | | | | | | | | | | 9 | 4 | | | 20 |
| 21 | (Japan) Katsuto Sano | Kawasaki | | | | | | | 12 | 8 | | | | | | | 12 |
| 22 | (Malaysia) Nazirul Izzat Bahaudin | Yamaha | | | | | | | | | | | | | 9 | 12 | 11 |
| 23 | (Malaysia) Akid Aziz | Yamaha | | | 11 | 10 | | | | | | | | | | | 11 |
| 24 | (China) Sha Juntong | Kawasaki | | | | | | | | | 7 | Ret | | | | | 9 |
| 25 | (Macau) Ao Leong Fu | Kawasaki | | | | | | | | | 11 | 13 | | | | | 8 |
| 26 | (China) Chen Hong Yan | Yamaha | | | | | | | | | 12 | 12 | | | | | 8 |
| 27 | (Japan) Kohta Arakawa | Honda | | | | | | | Ret | 9 | | | | | | | 7 |
| 28 | (China) Chen Yuan Hang | Honda | | | | | | | | | Ret | 11 | | | | | 5 |
| 29 | (Malaysia) Khairul Ikhwan Ajis | Yamaha | | | 12 | Ret | | | | | | | | | | | 4 |
| 30 | (Japan) Rei Toshima | Yamaha | | | | | | | Ret | 15 | | | | | | | 1 |
| 31 | (Philippines) TJ Alberto | Honda | Ret | Ret | | | | | | | | | | | | | 0 |
| | (China) Ou Jin Bin | Yamaha | | | | | | | | | DNS | DNS | | | | | 0 |

| Colour | Result |
|---|---|
| Gold | Winner |
| Silver | Second place |
| Bronze | Third place |
| Green | Points classification |
| Blue | Non-points classification |
| Blue | Non-classified finish (NC) |
| Purple | Retired, not classified (Ret) |
| Red | Did not qualify (DNQ) |
| Red | Did not pre-qualify (DNPQ) |
| Black | Disqualified (DSQ) |
| White | Did not start (DNS) |
| White | Withdrew (WD) |
| White | Race cancelled (C) |
| Blank | Did not practice (DNP) |
| Blank | Did not arrive (DNA) |
| Blank | Excluded (EX) |

**Bold** – Pole position
Italics – Fastest lap

==== Asia Production 250 ====
| Pos. | Rider | Bike | SEP (Malaysia) | | BEN (Australia) | | BUR (Thailand) | | SUZ (Japan) | | ZHU (China) | | SEP (Malaysia) | | BUR (Thailand) | | Pts |
| Pos. | Rider | Bike | R1 | R2 | R1 | R2 | R1 | R2 | R1 | R2 | R1 | R2 | R1 | R2 | R1 | R2 | Pts |
|---|---|---|---|---|---|---|---|---|---|---|---|---|---|---|---|---|---|
| 1 | (Indonesia) Andy Muhammad Fadly | Kawasaki | 2 | 2 | **1** | **Ret** | 6 | 5 | 1 | 3 | 5 | 9 | 5 | 2 | 1 | 4 | 214 |
| 2 | (Indonesia) Awhin Sanjaya | Honda | 4 | 3 | Ret | 7 | 8 | 2 | 4 | 1 | 2 | Ret | 4 | 1 | 2 | 3 | 198 |
| 3 | (Indonesia) Irfan Ardiansyah | Honda | 3 | Ret | 7 | 6 | 3 | 4 | 2 | 2 | 3 | 2 | 1 | 5 | 5 | Ret | 187 |
| 4 | (Thailand) Muklada Sarapuech | Honda | **Ret** | **1** | 3 | 2 | **1** | **Ret** | 5 | Ret | 6 | Ret | **2** | **Ret** | **3** | **Ret** | 143 |
| 5 | (Indonesia) Lucky Hendriansya | Honda | 1 | 11 | 15 | 4 | 7 | 8 | 6 | 21 | 4 | 4 | 6 | 4 | 9 | 10 | 133 |
| 6 | (Indonesia) Reynaldo Ratukore | Yamaha | 7 | Ret | 5 | 5 | 12 | 9 | 3 | 8 | 8 | 5 | 8 | 3 | 8 | 7 | 126 |
| 7 | (Thailand) Tatchakorn Buasri | Honda | | | 4 | 3 | 2 | 1 | 14 | Ret | 9 | Ret | 11 | 7 | 6 | 5 | 118 |
| 8 | (Indonesia) Rafid Topan Sucipto | Honda | 9 | Ret | WD | WD | 10 | 10 | **7** | **Ret** | **1** | **1** | 3 | Ret | 4 | 11 | 112 |
| 9 | (Thailand) Piyawat Patoomyos | Honda | | | 6 | 9 | 5 | 7 | 8 | 4 | 7 | 3 | 22 | Ret | Ret | 1 | 108 |
| 10 | (Japan) Aiki Iyoshi | Kawasaki | 6 | 4 | 2 | 1 | 16 | 6 | Ret | 6 | 13 | 20 | Ret | 12 | 7 | 22 | 104 |
| 11 | (Indonesia) Muhammad Faerozi | Yamaha | 5 | 5 | Ret | 11 | 4 | 3 | 9 | Ret | 16 | Ret | 7 | 6 | Ret | 12 | 86 |
| 12 | (Malaysia) Muzakkir Mohamed | Yamaha | 8 | 6 | 8 | 10 | 13 | 11 | 12 | Ret | 17 | 7 | Ret | 8 | 12 | 6 | 75 |
| 13 | (Malaysia) Nazirul Izzat Bahauddin | Yamaha | 10 | 7 | 9 | 8 | 17 | 15 | 11 | 17 | 10 | 8 | 14 | 19 | | | 52 |
| 14 | (Vietnam) Cao Viet Nam | Honda | 12 | 10 | 11 | 13 | 9 | 14 | WD | WD | 14 | 13 | 9 | 11 | 10 | Ret | 50 |
| 15 | (Indonesia) Anggi Setiawan | Yamaha | 13 | 9 | 12 | 16 | 15 | 16 | 16 | 11 | 11 | 6 | 13 | 10 | 18 | Ret | 44 |
| 16 | (Thailand) Suttipat Patchaeetron | Yamaha | Ret | Ret | 13 | 14 | 11 | 13 | Ret | 13 | 18 | 11 | 10 | 13 | 16 | 9 | 37 |
| 17 | (India) Sethu Rajiv | Honda | 11 | 13 | 10 | 12 | 22 | 12 | 15 | 14 | 15 | 10 | Ret | 15 | 14 | 18 | 35 |
| 18 | (Malaysia) Izam Ikmal | Kawasaki | Ret | 8 | | | 19 | 17 | 13 | 7 | 12 | 12 | | | | | 28 |
| 19 | (Thailand) Vorapong Malahuan | Yamaha | | | | | | | | | | | | | 13 | 2 | 23 |
| 20 | (Thailand) Sawapol Lillabong | Yamaha | 17 | 12 | 16 | 17 | 14 | 18 | 19 | 5 | 19 | 14 | 18 | 18 | 15 | 13 | 23 |
| 21 | (Malaysia) Sharol Shazras Yuzy | Honda | 16 | 14 | 20 | 18 | Ret | Ret | 22 | Ret | | | 16 | 16 | 11 | 8 | 15 |
| 22 | (Malaysia) Syarifuddin Azman | Honda | | | | | | | | | | | 12 | 9 | | | 11 |
| 23 | (Japan) Otojirou Tanimoto | Yamaha | | | | | | | 18 | 9 | | | | | | | 7 |
| 24 | (Japan) Shunya Mori | Honda | | | | | | | 20 | 10 | | | | | | | 6 |
| 25 | (Japan) Nobuteru Sasaki | Honda | | | | | | | 10 | Ret | | | | | | | 6 |
| 26 | (Japan) Kazuki Tomita | Honda | | | | | | | | 12 | | | | | | | 4 |
| 27 | (Chinese Taipei) Chiou Ke-Lung | Honda | 15 | Ret | 14 | 15 | | | | | | | | | | | 4 |
| 28 | (Malaysia) Muhammad Idil Fitri Mahadi | Kawasaki | | | | | | | | | | | 15 | 14 | 17 | Ret | 3 |
| 29 | (Malaysia) Harith Haziq Zamri | Kawasaki | | | | | 23 | 22 | 26 | 19 | 22 | 16 | 20 | 22 | 20 | 14 | 2 |
| 30 | (India) Senthil Chandrasekaran | Honda | 14 | Ret | 17 | Ret | Ret | 20 | 28 | 20 | 20 | 17 | 17 | 17 | Ret | 16 | 2 |
| 31 | (China) Zhao Sheng Jun Jie | Honda | | | | | | | | | 23 | 15 | | | | | 1 |
| 32 | (Japan) Hikari Okubo | TVS | | | | | | | | | | | | | Ret | 15 | 1 |
| 33 | (Japan) Keiji Goto | Kawasaki | | | | | | | 25 | 15 | | | | | | | 1 |
| 34 | (Malaysia) Sharul Ezwan Sharil | Kawasaki | 19 | 15 | 18 | Ret | | | | | | | | | | | 1 |
| 35 | (Chinese Taipei) Liu Junmei | Yamaha | 18 | 18 | 19 | Ret | 20 | 19 | 24 | 16 | 21 | 18 | 19 | 21 | 19 | Ret | 0 |
| 36 | (Malaysia) Allan Harris Herman | Kawasaki | 20 | 16 | | | | | | | | | | | | | 0 |
| 37 | (Thailand) Stewart Johnson | Kawasaki | 21 | 17 | 22 | 20 | 24 | 23 | 27 | Ret | 25 | Ret | 25 | 25 | 26 | 24 | 0 |
| 38 | (Chinese Taipei) Chih Ying Chiang | Yamaha | | | | | | | | | | | 27 | 27 | Ret | 17 | 0 |
| 39 | (Japan) Yuta Kasai | Honda | | | | | | | 17 | Ret | | | | | | | 0 |
| 40 | (Japan) Mui Nakahara | Honda | | | | | 21 | 21 | 23 | 18 | 24 | 19 | 23 | 23 | 22 | 19 | 0 |
| 41 | (Thailand) Kevin Johnson | Kawasaki | 22 | 19 | 21 | 19 | 24 | Ret | WD | WD | 26 | 21 | 24 | 26 | 25 | 23 | 0 |
| 42 | (Malaysia) Idlan Haqimi | Honda | | | | | | | | | | | 21 | 20 | | | 0 |
| 43 | (India) K.Y. Ahmed | TVS | | | | | | | | | | | | | Ret | 20 | 0 |
| 44 | (India) Jagan Kumar | TVS | | | | | | | | | | | | | 24 | 21 | 0 |
| 45 | (Hong Kong) Leong Nang Tse | Yamaha | | | | | | | | | | | 26 | 24 | | | 0 |

| Colour | Result |
|---|---|
| Gold | Winner |
| Silver | Second place |
| Bronze | Third place |
| Green | Points classification |
| Blue | Non-points classification |
| Blue | Non-classified finish (NC) |
| Purple | Retired, not classified (Ret) |
| Red | Did not qualify (DNQ) |
| Red | Did not pre-qualify (DNPQ) |
| Black | Disqualified (DSQ) |
| White | Did not start (DNS) |
| White | Withdrew (WD) |
| White | Race cancelled (C) |
| Blank | Did not practice (DNP) |
| Blank | Did not arrive (DNA) |
| Blank | Excluded (EX) |

**Bold** – Pole position
Italics – Fastest lap

==== Underbone 150 ====
| Pos. | Rider | Bike | SEP (Malaysia) | | BUR (Thailand) | | SUZ (Japan) | | ZHU (China) | | SEP (Malaysia) | | BUR (Thailand) | | Pts |
| Pos. | Rider | Bike | R1 | R2 | R1 | R2 | R1 | R2 | R1 | R2 | R1 | R2 | R1 | R2 | Pts |
|---|---|---|---|---|---|---|---|---|---|---|---|---|---|---|---|
| 1 | (Philippines) McKinley Kyle Paz | Yamaha | 1 | 3 | 6 | 11 | Ret | 13 | 1 | 5 | 6 | 10 | 6 | 16 | 121 |
| 2 | (Malaysia) Akid Aziz | Yamaha | **3** | **Ret** | 1 | 14 | **13** | **4** | 9 | 1 | **1** | **13** | Ret | Ret | 119 |
| 3 | (Malaysia) Haziq Fairues | Yamaha | 8 | 6 | **15** | **8** | Ret | 9 | 4 | 4 | 4 | 1 | **7** | **10** | 113 |
| 4 | (Indonesia) Wahyu Aji Trilaksana | Yamaha | 30 | 7 | 22 | 4 | 3 | Ret | Ret | 3 | 2 | 24 | 2 | 3 | 110 |
| 5 | (Malaysia) Ahmad Fazli Sham | Yamaha | 18 | 26 | 18 | 1 | 6 | 3 | 6 | 2 | 17 | 17 | 1 | 19 | 106 |
| 6 | (Indonesia) Aldi Satya Mahendra | Yamaha | 7 | Ret | 10 | 21 | Ret | 1 | **3** | **7** | 12 | 3 | 5 | 18 | 96 |
| 7 | (Indonesia) Wawan Wello | Honda | 6 | 4 | 8 | 2 | 2 | Ret | Ret | Ret | 13 | Ret | Ret | 2 | 94 |
| 8 | (Philippines) Fernando Masato | Yamaha | 5 | 1 | 19 | 20 | 14 | 12 | 2 | 6 | 11 | Ret | 3 | 20 | 93 |
| 9 | (Indonesia) Richard Taroreh | Yamaha | 12 | 15 | 1 | 5 | Ret | 8 | 7 | DNS | Ret | 18 | Ret | 1 | 78 |
| 10 | (Malaysia) Affendi Rosli | Yamaha | 2 | 8 | 3 | Ret | Ret | 5 | 13 | 17 | Ret | 25 | 13 | 5 | 72 |
| 11 | (Thailand) Peerapong Luiboonpeng | Yamaha | 4 | 5 | 20 | 6 | 5 | 7 | 12 | Ret | Ret | 4 | Ret | Ret | 71 |
| 12 | (Indonesia) Wahyu Nugroho | Yamaha | 13 | 19 | 4 | 3 | 16 | Ret | 5 | 8 | 9 | 21 | 10 | 13 | 69 |
| 13 | (Malaysia) Amirul Ariff Musa | Honda | 9 | 2 | Ret | 12 | 7 | Ret | Ret | 12 | 5 | Ret | 8 | 14 | 65 |
| 14 | (Malaysia) Faiz Zekri Sabri | Yamaha | 14 | Ret | 11 | 7 | 12 | Ret | 11 | 15 | Ret | 2 | 11 | 7 | 60 |
| 15 | (Malaysia) Rozaiman Said | Yamaha | 21 | 18 | 13 | 9 | 8 | 6 | Ret | 14 | 3 | Ret | 9 | 15 | 54 |
| 16 | (Indonesia) Gupita Kresna | Yamaha | 16 | 10 | Ret | Ret | 1 | DNS | 19 | 9 | 22 | Ret | Ret | Ret | 38 |
| 17 | (Malaysia) Izzat Zaidi | Yamaha | 17 | Ret | 12 | Ret | Ret | 11 | 14 | 11 | Ret | 5 | 17 | 6 | 37 |
| 18 | (Malaysia) Adib Rosley | Yamaha | Ret | 13 | 9 | 19 | Ret | 2 | DNS | DNS | | | 14 | 11 | 37 |
| 19 | (Malaysia) Fitri Ashraff Razali | Yamaha | 20 | 23 | 17 | Ret | 11 | 10 | 10 | 10 | 20 | 19 | 16 | 4 | 36 |
| 20 | (Malaysia) Hafiza Rofa | Yamaha | DNS | Ret | 5 | Ret | | | | | 8 | 12 | 4 | Ret | 36 |
| 21 | (Indonesia) Murobbil Vittoni | Yamaha | 11 | 16 | 7 | 18 | 9 | 14 | Ret | 18 | 18 | 27 | Ret | 9 | 30 |
| 22 | (Malaysia) Aiman Azman | Honda | 15 | 12 | Ret | 16 | 10 | Ret | 16 | DNS | Ret | 6 | | | 21 |
| 23 | (Japan) Gun Mie | Honda | 10 | 9 | 14 | 10 | Ret | DNS | | | | | Ret | 21 | 21 |
| 24 | (Indonesia) Syahrul Amin | Yamaha | 28 | 17 | 16 | 13 | 4 | Ret | 17 | Ret | 14 | 14 | Ret | 17 | 20 |
| 25 | (Malaysia) Tengku Affirudin | Yamaha | | | | | | | | | 10 | 7 | | | 15 |
| 26 | (Indonesia) Rizal Ferayadi | Honda | | | | | | | | | 9 | 22 | Ret | 8 | 15 |
| 27 | (Indonesia) Agung Fachrul | Yamaha | 19 | 14 | 23 | 15 | Ret | Ret | 8 | 13 | Ret | Ret | | | 14 |
| 28 | (Malaysia) Iqbal Abdul Malek | Yamaha | | | | | | | Ret | 20 | Ret | 8 | Ret | 12 | 12 |
| 29 | (Malaysia) Syafiq Rosli | Yamaha | | | | | | | | | Ret | 9 | | | 7 |
| 30 | (Malaysia) Ahmad Fazrul Sham | Yamaha | | | | | | | | | 15 | 11 | | | 6 |
| 31 | (Australia) Travis Hall | Honda | Ret | 11 | 21 | Ret | | | | | 24 | 23 | | | 5 |
| 32 | (Indonesia) Aditya Fauzi | Yamaha | | | | | | | | | | | 12 | Ret | 4 |
| 33 | (Indonesia) Nurjabad Fahnisyar | Yamaha | | | | | | | | | | | 15 | Ret | 1 |
| 34 | (Vietnam) Nguyen Vu Thanh | Honda | 26 | 24 | 26 | 22 | Ret | 15 | 22 | 21 | Ret | Ret | | | 1 |
| 35 | (Malaysia) Syarifuddin Azman | Honda | | | | | | | 15 | 16 | | | | | 1 |
| 36 | (Malaysia) Izzat Raduan | Yamaha | | | | | 15 | Ret | 18 | DNS | | | | | 1 |
| 37 | (Philippines) John Emerson Inguito | Yamaha | | | | | | | | | 16 | 15 | | | 1 |
| 38 | (Vietnam) Nguyen Duc Thanh | Honda | | | | | 20 | Ret | 21 | Ret | 23 | Ret | 20 | 22 | 0 |
| 39 | (Vietnam) Nguyen Anh Tuan | Honda | | | | | | | | | | | 19 | Ret | 0 |
| 40 | (Malaysia) Harith Farhan Baharin | Honda | 23 | 21 | | | | | | | | | | | 0 |
| 41 | (Malaysia) Azhar abdul Jalil | Yamaha | | | | | | | | | Ret | 26 | | | 0 |
| 42 | (Indonesia) Chepy Armansyah | Yamaha | 27 | DNS | | | | | | | | | | | 0 |
| 43 | (Malaysia) Luth Harith Erwan | Honda | | | 27 | Ret | | | | | | | | | 0 |
| 44 | (Malaysia) Azrulaffendi Hadi | Honda | 29 | Ret | | | | | | | | | | | 0 |
| 45 | (Vietnam) Le Khanh Loc | Honda | 22 | 22 | 25 | DNS | | | | | | | | | 0 |
| 46 | (Malaysia) Khairil Hisham | Yamaha | 25 | 20 | 24 | 17 | | | | | 19 | 20 | 18 | Ret | 0 |
| 47 | (Malaysia) Idlan Haqimi | Honda | | | | | 19 | Ret | | | | | | | 0 |
| 48 | (Malaysia) Afiq Asyraf Zulkifli | Honda | 24 | 25 | | | | | | | | | | | 0 |
| 49 | (Malaysia) Afizat Supaat | Honda | | | | | | | | | 21 | 16 | | | 0 |
| 50 | (Malaysia) Fadlyshah Redzuan | Honda | | | | | | | 20 | 19 | | | | | 0 |
| 51 | (Malaysia) Fareez Afeez | Yamaha | Ret | Ret | | | | | | | | | | | 0 |
| 52 | (Philippines) Amber Garcia† | Yamaha | | | | | | | | | | | Ret | Ret^{†} | 0 |

| Colour | Result |
|---|---|
| Gold | Winner |
| Silver | Second place |
| Bronze | Third place |
| Green | Points classification |
| Blue | Non-points classification |
| Blue | Non-classified finish (NC) |
| Purple | Retired, not classified (Ret) |
| Red | Did not qualify (DNQ) |
| Red | Did not pre-qualify (DNPQ) |
| Black | Disqualified (DSQ) |
| White | Did not start (DNS) |
| White | Withdrew (WD) |
| White | Race cancelled (C) |
| Blank | Did not practice (DNP) |
| Blank | Did not arrive (DNA) |
| Blank | Excluded (EX) |

**Bold** – Pole position
Italics – Fastest lap
