= Kohta Arakawa =

Japanese motorcycle racer (born 2002)

Kohta Arakawa 荒川 晃大
- Born: 15 November 2002 (age 23); Edogawa, Tokyo, Japan
- Nationality: Japanese
- Current team: Astemo Pro Honda SI Racing
- Bike number: 5

Championship titles
- All Japan ST600 (2022)
Statistics
All Japan ST1000
Active years	2023–
Championships	0
Manufacturer	Honda (2023–)
Previous teams	Moto Bum Honda
Last season (2026)	3rd (81 pts)
Starts / Wins / Podiums / Poles / F. laps / Points; 24 / 2 / 10 / 1 / 2 / 296
All Japan ST600
Active years	2019–2022
Championships	1 (2022)
Manufacturer	Honda
Team(s)	Moto Bum Honda
Best season (2022)	1st (113 pts)
Starts / Wins / Podiums / Poles / F. laps / Points; 24 / 2 / 11 / 10 / 3 / 329

Kohta Arakawa (Japanese: 荒川 晃大, Hepburn: Arakawa Kōta; born 15 November 2002) is a Japanese motorcycle racer who competes in the ST1000 class of the All Japan Road Race Championship for Astemo Pro Honda SI Racing. He is not related to the racing driver Rin Arakawa.

Arakawa is the 2022 All Japan Road Race Championship ST600 champion. He has competed in the Asia Road Racing Championship as a wildcard in 2022 and 2023, and is a double race winner of the same championship.

== Early life ==
Arakawa was born in the Edogawa ward of Tokyo, Japan. Influenced by his father, he rode an electric motorcycle for the first time at the age of three, later transitioning to pocketbikes. Arakawa won the Honda-backed NSF100 National Tournament, before joining the SRS-Moto academy at the age of 13, a Suzuka-based racing school aimed at developing young Japanese riders, which has had Grand Prix motorcycle racers like Ryuichi Kiyonari attend.

== Career ==
=== All Japan Road Race Championship ===
==== ST600 ====
In 2018, Arakawa won the Tsukuba Road Race & Suzuka Sunday ST600 championships, which granted him a seat in the 2019 All Japan Road Race Championship ST600 class with Moto Bum Honda. He finished in seventh place in his debut race at Motegi, aged 17. After some inconsistent races throughout the season, Arakawa took pole position in the final round at Suzuka and ultimately finished third in the Sunday race, claiming his maiden podium. His overall position in the standings was seventh. In 2020, Arakawa faced his second ST600 season, where he clinched two podiums and two pole positions, and finished fifth in the standings.

In 2021, Arakawa remained with Moto Bum for a third year. He claimed his maiden win in the second round at Sportsland Sugo, together with his fourth class pole position. He clinched two more podiums at Tsukuba and Suzuka, and finished the season in third place. Arakawa would face his fourth and final ST600 season in 2022. He finished on the podium in the first five races, including a win at Sportsland Sugo, and claimed the title after a fourth place in the final round at Suzuka.

==== ST1000 ====
In 2023, Arakawa stepped up to the ST1000 class with Moto Bum Honda. He started the season with top-ten finishes and claimed his first podium at Autopolis, firstly with a second-place finish in Race 1, and ultimately with a maiden win in Race 2. Arakawa also set his first ST1000 pole position in his rookie season at Okayama, and won his second class race in the final round at Suzuka. He finished the season as Rookie of the Year in second place, only five points away from riders' champion Kazuma Watanabe. Arakawa stayed with Moto Bum after his impressive rookie year. He started the 2024 season with championship aspirations but saw his momentum burdened after a disqualification in the opening round. He clinched one single podium in the remainder of the season and finished in fifth place overall.

In December 2024, Arakawa was announced to switch to Astemo Pro Honda SI Racing for the 2025 All Japan Road Race Championship season, after racing with Moto Bum Honda for six years. He teamed up with Taiga Hada. Arakawa claimed two podiums throughout the season, with a best finish of second in the final round at Suzuka.

==== JSB1000 ====
After signing with Astemo Pro Honda SI Racing full-time for the ST1000 class in 2025, Arakawa was given a wildcard spot for the JSB1000 opening round at Motegi. He qualified 18th and finished the race in 14th place, scoring two championship points in his debut race.

=== Asia Road Racing Championship ===
In 2019, Arakawa entered the Suzuka round in the SSP600 class of the 2019 Asia Road Racing Championship as a wildcard. He qualified fifth but crashed out in Race 1. His Race 2 result was ninth. In 2022, Arakawa returned to the Asia Road Racing Championship Sportsland Sugo round in the SSP600 class, once again as a wildcard. He took pole position and won both races. Arakawa made his last wildcard appearance in the championship in 2023. This time, he competed in the ASB1000 class at the Sportsland Sugo round, and finished eighth and fourth in Races 1 and 2.

=== Suzuka 8 Hours ===
Arakawa debuted in the 2023 Suzuka 8 Hours endurance race with Honda Dream RT Sakurai. The team qualified eighth and finished in fifth place overall. In June 2024, Arakawa participated in private pre-event HRC factory tests held at Suzuka, and was considered for the third rider spot alongside Takumi Takahashi and Johann Zarco, but was ultimately given the reserve rider role. In 2025, Arakawa was announced to participate in the 8 Hours with his All Japan team—Astemo Pro Honda SI Racing—alongside Kohta Nozane and Ryusei Yamanaka. The team qualified in tenth place for the endurance race, however, an engine problem during Arakawa's run forced them to retire from the race.

== Career statistics ==
=== All Japan Road Race Championship ===
==== Races by year ====
(key) (Races in bold indicate pole position; races in italics indicate fastest lap)

Year	Class	Bike	1	2	3	4	5	6	7	Pos	Pts
2019	ST600	Honda	MOT; 7	SUG; Ret	TSU1; 12	TSU2; Ret	OKA; 8	AUT; 9	**SUZ**; 3	7th	71
2020	ST600	Honda	SUG; 3	OKA; C	**AUT**; 3	MOT; 6	**SUZ**; Ret			5th	55
2021	ST600	Honda	MOT; 5	**SUG**; 1	TSU1; 15	TSU2; 2	**SUZ**; 2	OKA; 6	AUT; Ret	3rd	90
2022	ST600	Honda	**MOT**; 3	**SUG1**; 3	**SUG2**; 1	**AUT**; 2	OKA; 2	**SUZ**; 4		1st	113
2023	ST1000	Honda	MOT; 7	SUG; 6	AUT1; 2	AUT2; 1	**OKA**; Ret	SUZ; 1		2nd	92
2024	ST1000	Honda	MOT; DSQ	SUG; 3	AUT1; 5	AUT2; 7	OKA; 4	SUZ; 5		5th	63
2025	JSB1000	Honda	MOT; 14							28th	2
2025	ST1000	Honda		SUG; 9	MOT1; 5	MOT2; 3	AUT; 10‡	OKA; Ret	SUZ; 2	5th	60
2026	ST1000	Honda	SUG; 3	AUT; 4	MOT1; 14	MOT2; 3	OKA; 3	SUZ; 3		3rd	81

- ‡ – Half points were awarded based on the qualifying results.

=== Asia Road Racing Championship ===
==== Races by year ====
(key) (Races in bold indicate pole position; races in italics indicate fastest lap)

Year	Class	Bike	1		2		3		4		5		6		7		Pos	Pts
Year	Class	Bike	R1	R2	R1	R2	R1	R2	R1	R2	R1	R2	R1	R2	R1	R2	Pos	Pts
2019	SS600	Honda	SEP	SEP	BEN	BEN	BUR	BUR	SUZ; Ret	SUZ; 9	ZHU	ZHU	SEP	SEP	BUR	BUR	27th	7
2022	SS600	Honda	BUR	BUR	SEP	SEP	**SUG**; 1	**SUG**; 1	SEP	SEP	BUR	BUR					11th	50
2023	ASB1000	Honda	BUR	BUR	SEP	SEP	SUG; 8	SUG; 4	MAN	MAN	ZHU	ZHU	BUR	BUR			15th	21
2026	ASB1000	Honda	SEP	SEP	BUR	BUR	MOT; 6	MOT; 5	MAN	MAN	SEP	SEP	BUR	BUR			13th*	21*

* Season still in progress.

=== Suzuka 8 Hours ===
Year	Class	Team	Co-riders	Bike	Pos
2023	**EWC**	(Japan) Honda Dream RT Sakurai	(Japan) Kazuki Ito (Japan) Daijiro Hiura	CBR1000RR-R	5th
2025	**EWC**	(Japan) Astemo Pro Honda SI Racing	(Japan) Kohta Nozane (Japan) Ryusei Yamanaka	CBR1000RR-R	Ret
2026	**EWC**	(Japan) Astemo Pro Honda SI Racing	(Japan) Kohta Nozane (Japan) Taiga Hada	CBR1000RR-R	20th
