= 2014 Asia Talent Cup =

2014 Asia Talent Cup
Previous:	2013	Next:	2015

The 2014 Shell Advance Asia Talent Cup was the inaugural season of the Asia Talent Cup. Japanese rider Kaito Toba won the cup ahead of Yuta Date and Takuma Kunimine.

== Entry list ==
2014 entry list
No.	Rider
2	(Thailand) Muklada Sarapuech
3	(Malaysia) Shafiq Rasol
4	(Japan) Tsurugi Kitami
5	(Malaysia) Shafiq Ezzariq
6	(Japan) Yuta Date
7	(Malaysia) Fakhrusy Rostam
8	(Malaysia) Nazirul Bahauddin
9	(Malaysia) Ibrahim Norrodin
10	(Malaysia) Adam Norrodin
11	(Malaysia) Helmi Azman
12	(Singapore) Azhar Noor
13	(Thailand) Nakarin Atiratphuvapat
14	(Philippines) Ralph Torres
15	(Japan) Ryo Mizuno
16	(Japan) Kaito Toba
17	(Japan) Kaito Sekino
18	(Thailand) Somkiat Chantra
19	(China) Yuanhang Chen
20	(Japan) Tsubasa Yoshida
21	(Japan) Takuma Kunimine
22	(Japan) Ayumu Sasaki
23	(Indonesia) Wilman Hammar
Source: AsiaTalentCup.com

== Calendar ==
The following Grand prix were the scheduled Grand prix for the 2014 Asia Talent Cup.

2015 calendar
Round	Round	Date	Circuit
1	Commercial Bank Grand Prix of Qatar	21 March - 23 March	Losail International Circuit
2	(Indonesia) Indospeed Race Series	9 May - 11 May	Sentul International Circuit
3	(China) Pan Delta	13 June - 15 June	Zhuhai International Circuit
4	(China) Pan Delta	13 June - 15 June	Zhuhai International Circuit
5	(Malaysia) Bike Super Series	19 September - 21 September	Sepang International Circuit
6	(Malaysia) Bike Super Series	19 September - 21 September	Sepang International Circuit
7	Grand Prix of Japan	10 October - 12 October	Twin Ring Motegi
8	(Malaysia) Shell Advance Malaysian Motorcycle Grand Prix	24 October - 26 October	Sepang International Circuit
9	(Malaysia) Shell Advance Malaysian Motorcycle Grand Prix	24 October - 26 October	Sepang International Circuit

== Results and standings ==
Grand Prix The following results are the official race results of the 2014 Asia Talent Cup.

2014 Grand Prix results
Round	Round	Date	Circuit	Pole position	Race winner
1	Commercial Bank Grand Prix of Qatar	23 March	Losail International Circuit	Yuta Date	Yuta Date
2	(Indonesia) Indospeed Race Series	11 May	Sentul International Circuit	Nakarin Atiratphuvapat	Kaito Toba
3	(China) Pan Delta	14 June	Zhuhai International Circuit	Ayumu Sasaki	Kaito Toba
4	(China) Pan Delta	15 June	Zhuhai International Circuit	Ayumu Sasaki	Yuta Date
5	(Malaysia) Bike Super Series	20 June	Sepang International Circuit	Nakarin Atiratphuvapat	Kaito Toba
6	(Malaysia) Bike Super Series	21 June	Sepang International Circuit	Nakarin Atiratphuvapat	Ayumu Sasaki
7	Grand Prix of Japan	12 October	Twin Ring Motegi	Yuta Date	Ayumu Sasaki
8	(Malaysia) Shell Advance Malaysian Motorcycle Grand Prix	25 October	Sepang International Circuit	Kaito Toba	Shafiq Rasol
9	(Malaysia) Shell Advance Malaysian Motorcycle Grand Prix	26 October	Sepang International Circuit	Kaito Toba	Takuma Kunimine

== Riders' championship ==
Scoring System

Points are awarded to the top fifteen finishers. A rider has to finish the race to earn points.

Position	1st	2nd	3rd	4th	5th	6th	7th	8th	9th	10th	11th	12th	13th	14th	15th
Points	25	20	16	13	11	10	9	8	7	6	5	4	3	2	1

Pos.	Rider	QAT (Qatar)	IND (Indonesia)	CHN (China)	CHN (China)	MAL (Malaysia)	MAL (Malaysia)	JAP (Japan)	MAL (Malaysia)	MAL (Malaysia)	Pts
1	(Japan) Kaito Toba	Ret	1	1	4	1	2	5	2	3	155
2	(Japan) Yuta Date	1	3	2	1	3	6	7	3	19	137
3	(Japan) Takuma Kunimine	5	6	5	2	4	Ret	3	4	1	119
4	(Japan) Ayumu Sasaki	3	4	3	3	Ret	1	1	Ret	DNS	111
5	(Malaysia) Shafiq Rasol	11	16	7	Ret	2	13	2	1	2	102
6	(Japan) Ryo Mizuno	8	2	4	5	6	4	16	18	10	81
7	(Malaysia) Adam Norrodin	7	15	6	7	5	3	Ret	8	5	75
8	(Thailand) Nakarin Atiratphuvapat	4	21	13	6	Ret	5	8	7	9	61
9	(Japan) Tsurugi Kitami	2	7	Ret	Ret	10	7	10	12	11	59
10	(Japan) Kaito Sekino	9	8	10	8	16	10	4	14	14	52
11	(Thailand) Somkiat Chantra	6	11	18	15	Ret	11	6	10	4	50
12	(Malaysia) Fakhrusy Rostam	13	12	11	9	7	Ret	Ret	6	20	48
13	(Malaysia) Helmi Azman	Ret	9	8	Ret	9	Ret	9	13	7	41
14	(Malaysia) Shafiq Ezzariq	14	13	9	Ret	8	Ret	Ret	11	8	33
15	(Thailand) Muklada Sarapuech	Ret	20	12	10	12	9	Ret	5	Ret	32
16	(Indonesia) Wilman Hammar	10	5	15	16	15	17	11	15	12	29
17	(China) Yuanhang Chen	15	18	19	12	13	12	17	9	13	22
18	(Malaysia) Ibrahim Norrodin	Ret	23	17	11	11	8	Ret	16	15	19
19	(Malaysia) Nazirul Bahauddin	12	14	14	Ret	Ret	18	12	Ret	20	12
20	(Philippines) Ralph Torres	Ret	17	16	13	14	16	14	20	18	7
21	(Indonesia) Andi Farid Izdihar		10								6
22	(Singapore) Azhar Noor	16	22	Ret	14	Ret	14	15	17	16	5
23	(Japan) Tsubasa Yoshida	Ret	19	Ret	Ret	17	15	13	19	17	4
Pos.	Rider	QAT (Qatar)	IND (Indonesia)	CHN (China)	CHN (China)	MAL (Malaysia)	MAL (Malaysia)	JAP (Japan)	MAL (Malaysia)	MAL (Malaysia)	Pts
