= Syunya Mori =

Japanese motorcycle racer

- Nationality: Japanese
- Born: (Japan)
- Current team: TRICK STAR Club
- Bike number: 9

Syunya Mori is a former Grand Prix motorcycle racer from Japan. He currently races in the MFJ All Japan J-GP3 Championship aboard a Kawasaki Ninja 250, and has previous competed in the MFJ All Japan Road Race GP125 Championship, the Asia Dream Cup and the Spanish 125GP Championship.

== Career statistics ==
=== By season ===
Season	Class	Motorcycle	Team	Number	Race	Win	Podium	Pole	FLap	Pts	Plcd
2010	125cc	Honda	Racing Sayama	42	1	0	0	0	0	0	NC
2011	125cc	Aprilia	Phonica Racing	65	1	0	0	0	0	0	NC
Total					2	0	0	0	0	0	

=== Races by year ===
Year	Class	Bike	1	2	3	4	5	6	7	8	9	10	11	12	13	14	15	16	17	Pos	Points
2010	125cc	Honda	QAT	SPA	FRA	ITA	GBR	NED	CAT	GER	CZE	INP	RSM	ARA	JPN; 20	MAL	AUS	POR	VAL	NC	0
2011	125cc	Aprilia	QAT	SPA	POR	FRA	CAT	GBR	NED	ITA	GER	CZE	INP	RSM	ARA	JPN; 21	AUS	MAL	VAL	NC	0
