= Yuki Ito (motorcyclist) =

Japanese motorcycle racer

- Nationality: Japanese
- Born: 14 November 1991 (age 35); Tokyo, Japan
- Current team: Yamaha Racing Asean & Ito Racing
- Bike number: 76 & 25

Yuki Ito (伊藤 勇樹, Itō Yūki) is a Grand Prix motorcycle racer from Japan. He currently races in the Asia Road Racing SS600 Championship and the All Japan Road Race J-GP2 Championship aboard a Yamaha YZF-R6. He has also competed in the MFJ All Japan JSB1000 Championship, the MFJ All Japan Road Race GP250 Championship, and the East Japan GP250 Challenge Cup, which he was champion of in 2007.

== Career statistics ==
2006- 19th, All Japan Road Race Championship GP250 #76 Yamaha TZR250
2007- 12th, All Japan Road Race Championship GP250 #19 Yamaha TZR250 / 1st, East Japan GP250 Challenge Cup #76 Yamaha TZR250
2008- 9th, All Japan Road Race Championship GP250 #12 Yamaha TZR250
2010- All Japan Road Race Championship ST600 #76 Yamaha YZF-R6
2011- 19th, All Japan Road Race Championship ST600 #76 Yamaha YZF-R6
2012- 10th, All Japan Road Race Championship ST600 #19 Yamaha YZF-R6 / 5th, Asia Road Race Championship SS600 #19 Yamaha YZF-R6
2013- 11th, All Japan Road Race Championship ST600 #76 Yamaha YZF-R6 / 4th, Asia Road Race Championship SS600 #76 Yamaha YZF-R6
2014- 8th, All Japan Road Race Championship ST600 #76 Yamaha YZF-R6 / 2nd, Asia Road Race Championship SS600 #76 Yamaha YZF-R6
2015- 16th, All Japan Road Race Championship JSB1000 #41 Yamaha YZF-R1 / 4th, Asia Road Race Championship SS600 #76 Yamaha YZF-R6
2016- 13th, Asia Road Race Championship SS600 #76 Yamaha YZF-R6
2017- 4th, Asia Road Race Championship SS600 #76 Yamaha YZF-R6
2018- All Japan Road Race J-GP2 Championship #25 / Asia Road Race Championship SS600 #76 Yamaha YZF-R6

=== By season ===
Season	Class	Motorcycle	Team	Number	Race	Win	Podium	Pole	FLap	Pts	Plcd
2008	250cc	Yamaha	Dog Fight Racing	68	1	0	0	0	0	0	NC
Total					**1**	**0**	**0**	**0**	**0**	**0**	

==== Races by year ====
(key)

Year	Class	Bike	1	2	3	4	5	6	7	8	9	10	11	12	13	14	15	16	17	Pos.	Pts
2008	250cc	Yamaha	QAT	SPA	POR	CHN	FRA	ITA	CAT	GBR	NED	GER	CZE	RSM	INP	JPN; 23	AUS	MAL	VAL	NC	0

=== Asia Superbike 1000 ===
==== Races by year ====
(key) (Races in bold indicate pole position; races in italics indicate fastest lap)

Year	Bike	1		2		3		4		5		6		Pos	Pts
Year	Bike	R1	R2	R1	R2	R1	R2	R1	R2	R1	R2	R1	R2	Pos	Pts
2022	Yamaha	CHA; 10	CHA; 10	SEP; Ret	SEP; 9	SUG; 7	SUG; 3	SEP; 6	SEP; 4	CHA; 8	CHA; 7			6th	84
2023	Yamaha	CHA	CHA	SEP	SEP	SUG; 5	SUG; 6	MAN; 8	MAN; C	ZHU; 5	ZHU; 5	CHA; 8	CHA; 9	8th	66

=== Suzuka 8 Hours ===
Year	Class	Team	Co-riders	Bike	Pos
2026	**EWC**	(Japan) Bakuon Team Nagano	(Japan) Shigenori Sakurayama (Japan) Ren Okabe	Yamaha YZF-R1	TBD
