= Mohamad Zamri Baba =

Malaysian motorcycle racer

- Nationality: Malaysian
- Born: 26 November 1983 (age 42); Negeri Sembilan, Malaysia
- Current team: MuSASHi Boon Siew Honda Racing
- Bike number: 52

Mohamad Zamri Baba (born 26 November 1983) is a Grand Prix motorcycle racer from Malaysia. He races in the Asia Road Race Championship in the SS600 class for MuSASHi Boon Siew Honda Racing.

In June 2015, Zamri was in a coma after he was hit by another rider after crashing onto the gravel bed during Race 1 of the SuperSports 600cc event, a second round of the FIM Asia Road Racing Championship.

In October 2015, four months after the accident, Zamri regained awareness from coma and made a visit with family during Round 8 of the 2015 Petronas AAM Malaysian Cub Prix Championship at the Malaysia Agro Exhibition Park (MAEPS) in Serdang, Selangor.

== Career statistics ==
=== By season ===
Season	Class	Motorcycle	Team	Number	Race	Win	Podium	Pole	FLap	Pts	Plcd
2010	Moto2	Moriwaki	Petronas SIC TWMR Malaysia	87	1	0	0	0	0	0	NC
2011	Moto2	Moriwaki	Petronas Malaysia	87	1	0	0	0	0	0	NC
Total					2	0	0	0	0	0	

=== Races by year ===
Year	Class	Bike	1	2	3	4	5	6	7	8	9	10	11	12	13	14	15	16	17	Pos	Points
2010	Moto2	Moriwaki	QAT	SPA	FRA	ITA	GBR	NED	CAT	GER	CZE	INP	RSM	ARA	JPN	MAL; 22	AUS	POR	VAL	NC	0
2011	Moto2	Moriwaki	QAT	SPA	POR	FRA	CAT	GBR	NED	ITA	GER	CZE	INP	RSM	ARA	JPN	AUS	MAL; 18	VAL	NC	0
