= 2017 Asia Road Racing Championship =

22nd season Asia Road Racing Championship

2017 Asia Road Racing Championship
Previous:	2016	Next:	2018

The 2017 Idemitsu FIM Asia Road Racing Championship was the 22nd season of the Asia Road Racing Championship. The Season started on 1 April at Johor Circuit in Malaysia and ended on December 3 at Chang International Circuit in Thailand. This year mark the first and only Suzuki GSX-R 150 are used in Suzuki Asian Challenge as it was final year for Suzuki Asian Challenge. Marking the end of any One Make Race in Asia Road Racing Championship before 2023 season.

== Calendar and results ==
Round	Circuit	Date	SS600 Winners	AP250 Winners	UB150 Winners	Suzuki Asian Challenge Winners
1	(Malaysia) Johor Circuit	1–2 April	R1: (Malaysia) Zaqhwan Zaidi	R1: (Indonesia) Gerry Salim	R1: (Malaysia) Fakhrusy Syakirin Rostam	R1: (Philippines) Mario Borbon Jr.
1	(Malaysia) Johor Circuit	1–2 April	R2: (Japan) Taiga Hada	R2: (Indonesia) Gerry Salim	R2: (Malaysia) Akid Aziz	R2: (Philippines) April King Mascardo
2	(Thailand) Chang International Circuit	14–15 April	R1: (Malaysia) Azlan Shah	R1: (Indonesia) Gerry Salim	R1: (Malaysia) Azroy Anuar	R1: (Philippines) April King Mascardo
2	(Thailand) Chang International Circuit	14–15 April	R2: (Malaysia) Azlan Shah	R2: (Japan) Takehiro Yamamoto	R2: (Indonesia) Wahyu Aji Trilaksana	R2: (Japan) Tetsuya Fujita
3	(Japan) Suzuka Circuit	3–4 June	R1: (Australia) Anthony West	R1: (Indonesia) Gerry Salim	R1: (Indonesia) Wahyu Aji Trilaksana	R1: (Thailand) Punchana Kulrojchalalai
3	(Japan) Suzuka Circuit	3–4 June	R2: (Australia) Anthony West	R2: (Indonesia) Gerry Salim	R2: (Malaysia) Fakhrusy Syakirin Rostam	R2: (Thailand) Punchana Kulrojchalalai
4	(Indonesia) Sentul International Circuit	12–13 August	R1: (Indonesia) Dimas Ekky Pratama	R1: (Indonesia) Gerry Salim	R1: (Malaysia) Akid Aziz	R1: (Thailand) Punchana Kulrojchalalai
4	(Indonesia) Sentul International Circuit	12–13 August	R2: (Thailand) Decha Kraisart	R2: (Indonesia) Gerry Salim	R2: (Indonesia) Richard Taroreh	R2: (Indonesia) Jefri Tosema
5	(India) Madras International Circuit	23–24 September	R1: (Malaysia) Zaqhwan Zaidi	R1: (Japan) Tomoyoshi Koyama	R1: (Malaysia) Fakhrusy Syakirin Rostam	Did Not Participate
5	(India) Madras International Circuit	23–24 September	R2: (Japan) Yuki Ito	R2: (Indonesia) Galang Hendra Pratama	R2: (Malaysia) Azroy Anuar	Did Not Participate
6	(Thailand) Chang International Circuit	30 November–3 December	R1: (Thailand) Apiwat Wongthananon	R1: (Indonesia) Rheza Danica Ahrens	R1: (Indonesia) Wahyu Aji Trilaksana	R1: (Thailand) Patis Chooprathet
6	(Thailand) Chang International Circuit	30 November–3 December	R2: (Thailand) Apiwat Wongthananon	R2: (Japan) Tomoyoshi Koyama	R2: (Malaysia) Azroy Anuar	R2: (Thailand) Punchana Kulrojchalalai

== Teams and riders ==
=== Supersport 600 ===
SS600 Entry List
Team	Constructor	No.	Rider	Rounds
RAMA Honda by NTS T-Pro Ten10	Honda	14	(Australia) Broc Pearson	6
RAMA Honda by NTS T-Pro Ten10	Honda	17	(Japan) Sena Yamada	All
RAMA Honda by NTS T-Pro Ten10	Honda	23	(Japan) Taiga Hada	All
RAMA Honda by NTS T-Pro Ten10	Honda	69	(India) Sarath Kumar	All
Astra Honda Racing Team	Honda	16	(Indonesia) Irfan Ardiansyah	1–2, 5–6
Astra Honda Racing Team	Honda	20	(Indonesia) Dimas Ekky Pratama	4
Musashi Boon Siew Honda Racing	Honda	21	(Malaysia) Zaqhwan Zaidi	All
Musashi Boon Siew Honda Racing	Honda	634	(Japan) Teppei Nagoe	All
MOTO BUM Honda	Honda	32	(Japan) Ikuhiro Enokido	3
AP Honda Racing Thailand	Honda	45	(Thailand) Sittisak Onchawiang	5
AP Honda Racing Thailand	Honda	59	(Thailand) Ratthapong Wilairot	All
AP Honda Racing Thailand	Honda	104	(Japan) Tatsuya Yamaguchi	1–4, 6
THRC Thai Honda Racing Club	Honda	123	(Thailand) Passawit Thitivararak	6
Manuel Tech KYT Kawasaki Racing	Kawasaki	25	(Malaysia) Azlan Shah	All
Manuel Tech KYT Kawasaki Racing	Kawasaki	33	(Indonesia) Ahmad Yudhistira	All
Kawasaki Thailand Racing Team	Kawasaki	100	(Thailand) Thitipong Warokorn	6
Team Kagayama	Suzuki	71	(Japan) Yukio Kagayama	3
Akeno Speed Racing	Yamaha	13	(Australia) Anthony West	2–4, 6
Akeno Speed Racing	Yamaha	19	(Australia) Aaron Morris	1
Akeno Speed Racing	Yamaha	29	(Australia) Patrick Li	6
Akeno Speed Racing	Yamaha	82	(Japan) Ayumu Tanaka	2–3
Team One For All	Yamaha	18	(Chinese Taipei) Lin Chia Hao	3
Yamaha Thailand Racing Team	Yamaha	22	(Thailand) Apiwat Wongthananon	6
Yamaha Thailand Racing Team	Yamaha	24	(Thailand) Decha Kraisart	1–2, 4–6
Yamaha Thailand Racing Team	Yamaha	65	(Thailand) Chalermpol Polamai	All
Petronas Sprinta Racing	Yamaha	27	(Malaysia) Kasma Daniel	4
Ito Racing GMD Suzuka	Yamaha	31	(Japan) Keisuke Maeda	3
K-Max Racing	Yamaha	41	(Japan) Noriyuki Haga	All
Yamaha Ts Racing Team	Yamaha	46	(Thailand) Ratchadda Nakcharoensri	6
Chunetsu Racing	Yamaha	51	(Japan) Yoichi Hosono	4
Yamaha Racing	Yamaha	64	(Thailand) Keminth Kubo	All
Yamaha Racing	Yamaha	76	(Japan) Yuki Ito	All

Key
Regular rider
Wildcard rider
Replacement rider

=== Asia Production 250 ===
AP250 Entry List
Team	Constructor	No.	Rider	Rounds
Supra Studio Honda Ikazuchi Racing Team	Honda	11	(Japan) Takehiro Yamamoto	All
Supra Studio Honda Ikazuchi Racing Team	Honda	75	(Indonesia) Herman Baharuddin	1–3
RAMA Honda	Honda	17	(India) Sethu Rajiv	All
RAMA Honda	Honda	51	(Japan) Kenta Fujii	6
RAMA Honda	Honda	71	(Japan) Tomoyoshi Koyama	All
Team TEC2	Honda	20	(Japan) Yuta Kasai	3
Astra Honda Racing Team	Honda	23	(Indonesia) Andi Farid Izdihar	4
Astra Honda Racing Team	Honda	31	(Indonesia) Gerry Salim	All
Astra Honda Racing Team	Honda	123	(Indonesia) Rheza Danica Ahrens	All
Astra Honda Racing Team	Honda	198	(Indonesia) Awhin Sanjaya	1–3, 6
AP Honda Racing Thailand	Honda	44	(Thailand) Muklada Sarapuech	All
AP Honda Racing Thailand	Honda	46	(Thailand) Vorapong Malahuan	1–3, 5-6
Astra Motor Racing Team	Honda	54	(Indonesia) Sudarmono	4
Yuzy Honda Vietnam Racing Team	Honda	95	(Vietnam) Bui Duy Thong	All
Proliner Racetech Ultra Speed	Honda	119	(Indonesia) Yaasin Gabriel Somma	4
Puma Ball Furukawa VROOM Astra Racing Team	Honda	125	(Indonesia) Ricky Susanto	4
Trick Star Club	Kawasaki	13	(Japan) Taiki Fujimura	3
Trick Star Racing	Kawasaki	21	(Japan) Shunya Mori	3
Manual Tech KYT Kawasaki Racing	Kawasaki	108	(Indonesia) Andy Muhammad Fadly	All
Hong Leong Yamaha Racing	Yamaha	12	(Malaysia) Fitri Ashraff Razali	All
Hong Leong Yamaha Racing	Yamaha	50	(Malaysia) Ahmad Afif Amran	All
Yamaha Thailand Racing Team	Yamaha	14	(Thailand) Peerappong Luiboonpeng	All
Yamaha Thailand Racing Team	Yamaha	39	(Thailand) Peerapong Boonlert	All
Yamaha Thailand Racing Team	Yamaha	500	(Thailand) Anupab Sarmoon	All
ONEXOX TKKR Racing Team	Yamaha	15	(Malaysia) Khairul Ikhwan Ajis	2
ONEXOX TKKR Racing Team	Yamaha	25	(Malaysia) Haeikal Akmal Zakaria	1, 3
ONEXOX TKKR Racing Team	Yamaha	35	(Malaysia) Syafiq Rasol	1–5
ONEXOX TKKR Racing Team	Yamaha	55	(Malaysia) Helmi Azman	4
ONEXOX TKKR Racing Team	Yamaha	78	(Malaysia) Afiq Azmi	5–6
ONEXOX TKKR Racing Team	Yamaha	555	(Malaysia) Faiz Zekri Sabri	6
Team One For All	Yamaha	16	(Vietnam) Tran Thi Doan Trang	1–2
Team One For All	Yamaha	72	(Japan) Ukyo Furuichi	6
Team One For All	Yamaha	77	(Chinese Taipei) Hsu Yung Chieh	1–5
Team One For All	Yamaha	97	(Thailand) Jirakit Theeranupong	6
Team One For All	Yamaha	410	(Japan) Takashi Suzuki	4–5
Team One For All	Yamaha	750	(Japan) Naoko Takasugi	All
RCB KAGE Motobatt Yamaha YY Pang Racing	Yamaha	18	(Malaysia) Adib Rosley	1–5
RCB KAGE Motobatt Yamaha YY Pang Racing	Yamaha	68	(Malaysia) Fareez Afeez	6
Titanium Power Racing	Yamaha	19	(Japan) Naoaki Kubo	3
Akeno Speed Racing Team	Yamaha	22	(Japan) Soichiro Minamimoto	1–4, 6
Akeno Speed Racing Team	Yamaha	33	(Japan) Yusuke Nakamura	1–4, 6
Yamaha Yamalube WR KYT TJM Racetech Racing	Yamaha	27	(Indonesia) Rusman Fadhil	All
Yamaha Yamalube WR KYT TJM Racetech Racing	Yamaha	96	(Indonesia) Immanuel Putra Pratna	All
K-Max Racing Team	Yamaha	41	(Japan) Akito Haga	3–6
Yamaha K Sport Yamalube Racing Boy	Yamaha	59	(Thailand) Akkarak Tesang	6
Dog Fight Racing Yamaha	Yamaha	61	(Japan) Rei Toshima	3
Yamaha HiSpeed Washi Racing Team	Yamaha	90	(Thailand) Kanatan Jaiman	6
Yamaha EZI Lubritex Speed KTV Bestsell Yamotor Sport Team	Yamaha	91	(Thailand) Chanachai Boongam	6
Yamaha Racing Indonesia	Yamaha	99	(Indonesia) Galang Hendra Pratama	All
Yamaha Racing Indonesia	Yamaha	150	(Indonesia) Wilman Hammer	4
Yamaha Racing Indonesia	Yamaha	179	(Indonesia) Richard Taroreh	6
Yamaha Racing Indonesia	Yamaha	222	(Indonesia) Reynaldo Ratukore	All
Yamaha Racing Indonesia	Yamaha	250	(Indonesia) Rafid Topan Sucipto	4
Hitman RC Koushien Yamaha	Yamaha	117	(Japan) Shota Ite	3

Key
Regular rider
Wildcard rider
Replacement rider

=== Underbone 150 ===
UB150 Entry List
Team	Constructor	No.	Rider	Rounds
M-Mate Liberty Honda Racing	Honda	15	(Malaysia) Syafiq Rosli	All
M-Mate Liberty Honda Racing	Honda	32	(India) Prabhu Arunagiri	5
M-Mate Liberty Honda Racing	Honda	33	(Indonesia) Decky Tiarno Aldy	4
M-Mate Liberty Honda Racing	Honda	72	(China) Yuan Ji Bo	1–4, 6
M-Mate Liberty Honda Racing	Honda	131	(Indonesia) Wahyu Nugraha	4
GCX Ultraspeed Racing Team	Honda	16	(Indonesia) Wahyu Widodo	4
Yuzy Honda Vietnam Racing Team	Honda	20	(Malaysia) Azroy Anuar	1–2, 4–6
Yuzy Honda Vietnam Racing Team	Honda	24	(Vietnam) Cao Viet Nam	All
Yuzy Honda Vietnam Racing Team	Honda	28	(Malaysia) Sasitharen Sukumaran	3
Yuzy Honda Vietnam Racing Team	Honda	63	(Malaysia) Amirul Ariff Musa	All
SCK Rapido Hi Rev Honda Racing Team	Honda	36	(Malaysia) Affendi Rosli	1
SCK Rapido Hi Rev Honda Racing Team	Honda	56	(Thailand) Nattawut Rungkigsawas	6
SCK Rapido Hi Rev Honda Racing Team	Honda	65	(Malaysia) Fakhrusy Syakirin Rostam	1–5
SCK Rapido Hi Rev Honda Racing Team	Honda	92	(Malaysia) Muzakkir Mohamed	All
Yamaha Racing Indonesia	Yamaha	11	(Indonesia) Dicky Ersa	4
Yamaha Racing Indonesia	Yamaha	60	(Indonesia) Wahyu Aji Trilaksana	All
UMA Racing Yamaha Maju Motor	Yamaha	13	(Malaysia) Akid Aziz	All
UMA Racing Yamaha Maju Motor	Yamaha	26	(Malaysia) Haziq Fairues	All
RCB KAGE Motobatt Yamaha YY Pang Racing Team	Yamaha	18	(Malaysia) Tengku Amirul Haffiruddin	1–2, 4–5
RCB KAGE Motobatt Yamaha YY Pang Racing Team	Yamaha	88	(Malaysia) Azhar Jalil	6
RCB KAGE Motobatt Yamaha YY Pang Racing Team	Yamaha	98	(Malaysia) Izzat Zaidi	All
RCB KAGE Motobatt Yamaha YY Pang Racing Team	Yamaha	118	(Malaysia) Adib Rosley	3
ONEXOX TKKR Racing Team	Yamaha	19	(Malaysia) Norizman Ismail	1–2
ONEXOX TKKR Racing Team	Yamaha	55	(Malaysia) Helmi Azman	All
ONEXOX TKKR Racing Team	Yamaha	95	(Malaysia) Khairul Ikhwan Ajis	3–6
Yamaha Racing Boy UMA Thailand	Yamaha	29	(Thailand) Paitoon Nakhtong	6
Team One For All	Yamaha	54	(Malaysia) Hafieenaz Ali	All
Yamaha Racing Boy Motul Motobatt DID TA TUM Racing	Yamaha	86	(Thailand) Suttipat Pachanetorn	6
Yamaha Yamalube WR KYT TJM RACETECH Racing	Yamaha	96	(Indonesia) Anggi Setiawan	All
SND Factory Indonesia	Yamaha	130	(Indonesia) Owie Nurhuda	4, 6
Yamaha Yamalube Justi Putra Usaha Jaya 549 Kaboci	Yamaha	179	(Indonesia) Richard Taroreh	4

Key
Regular rider
Wildcard rider
Replacement rider

=== Suzuki Asian Challenge ===
Suzuki Asian Challenge Entry List
Constructor	Motorcycle	No.	Rider	Rounds
Suzuki	Suzuki GSX R150	1	(Indonesia) Jefri Tosema	4
Suzuki	Suzuki GSX R150	10	(Malaysia) Arfyq Hillman	1–2
Suzuki	Suzuki GSX R150	11	(Indonesia) Ahmad saugi Muchtar	1–4, 6
Suzuki	Suzuki GSX R150	12	(Malaysia) Nazif Nor Samsol	4, 6
Suzuki	Suzuki GSX R150	16	(Philippines) April King Mascardo	1–4, 6
Suzuki	Suzuki GSX R150	17	(Japan) Tetsuya Fujita	1–4, 6
Suzuki	Suzuki GSX R150	18	(Thailand) Patis Chooprathet	2, 6
Suzuki	Suzuki GSX R150	21	(India) Jagan Kumar	6
Suzuki	Suzuki GSX R150	22	(Philippines) Eane Jaye Sobretodo	1–4, 6
Suzuki	Suzuki GSX R150	26	(United Kingdom) Bruce Wilson	4
Suzuki	Suzuki GSX R150	27	(Indonesia) Nur Al Fath	1–4, 6
Suzuki	Suzuki GSX R150	29	(Philippines) Mario Borbon Jr	1–4
Suzuki	Suzuki GSX R150	32	(India) Prabhu Arunagiri	1–3
Suzuki	Suzuki GSX R150	33	(India) K.Y. Ahmed	1–4, 6
Suzuki	Suzuki GSX R150	43	(Australia) Edward Faulkhead	1–4, 6
Suzuki	Suzuki GSX R150	46	(Sri Lanka) Aaron Gunawardena	1–4, 6
Suzuki	Suzuki GSX R150	54	(Malaysia) Anas Ikhwan	1
Suzuki	Suzuki GSX R150	76	(Indonesia) Chepy Armansyah	1–4, 6
Suzuki	Suzuki GSX R150	78	(Thailand) Punchana Kulrojchalalai	1–4, 6
Suzuki	Suzuki GSX R150	83	(Japan) Takeru Murase	3
Suzuki	Suzuki GSX R150	96	(Nepal) Bikram Thapa	2–4, 6
Suzuki	Suzuki GSX R150	98	(Malaysia) Muhammad Zulhilmi	1–2

== Championship standings ==
Points

Position	**1st**	**2nd**	**3rd**	**4th**	**5th**	**6th**	**7th**	**8th**	**9th**	**10th**	**11th**	**12th**	**13th**	**14th**	**15th**
Points	25	20	16	13	11	10	9	8	7	6	5	4	3	2	1

=== Riders standings ===
==== Supersport 600 ====
Pos.	Rider	Bike	JOH (Malaysia)		BUR (Thailand)		SUZ (Japan)		SEN (Indonesia)		MAD (India)		BUR (Thailand)		Pts
Pos.	Rider	Bike	R1	R2	R1	R2	R1	R2	R1	R2	R1	R2	R1	R2	Pts
1	(Malaysia) Azlan Shah	Kawasaki	4	2	1	1	4	10	7	9	10	12	5	3	155
2	(Malaysia) Zaqhwan Zaidi	Honda	**1**	**Ret**	4	3	3	6	**4**	**DNS**	1	2	10	7	153
3	(Japan) Taiga Hada	Honda	2	1	Ret	6	6	4	3	12	2	3	9	8	149
4	(Japan) Yuki Ito	Yamaha	3	11	5	5	2	2	15	7	3	1	Ret	9	141
5	(Indonesia) Ahmad Yudhistira	Kawasaki	7	4	3	4	DNS	13	2	2	7	9	7	10	125
6	(Australia) Anthony West	Yamaha			DSQ	DSQ	1	1	6	6			2	2	110
7	(Thailand) Charlempol Polaimai	Yamaha	6	10	2	13	Ret	5	Ret	3	Ret	6	4	4	102
8	(Thailand) Decha Kraisart	Yamaha	5	13	**Ret**	**2**			5	1	Ret	5	6	6	101
9	(Thailand) Ratthapong Wilairot	Honda	Ret	5	6	9	DSQ	9	8	8	5	14	8	11	77
10	(Japan) Noriyuki Haga	Yamaha	12	6	Ret	10	7	12	14	11	6	10	11	12	65
11	(Japan) Teppei Nagoe	Honda	9	8	11	11	11	Ret	13	16	4	4	Ret	13	62
12	(Japan) Tatsuya Yamaguchi	Honda	11	7	8	8	9	8	12	10			14	15	58
13	(Japan) Sena Yamada	Honda	10	9	10	12	12	15	10	14	9	8	13	14	56
14	(Thailand) Apiwat Wongthananon	Yamaha											**1**	**1**	50
15	(Indonesia) Irfan Ardiansyah	Honda	8	3	7	14					8	11	15	20	49
16	(Indonesia) Dimas Ekky Pratama	Honda							1	4					38
17	(Thailand) Keminth Kubo	Yamaha	Ret	Ret	9	7	Ret	14	9	13	**Ret**	**DNS**	12	16	32
18	(Thailand) Thitipong Warokorn	Kawasaki											3	5	27
19	(Japan) Yukio Kagayama	Suzuki					8	3							24
20	(Japan) Ikuhiro Enokido	Honda					**5**	**7**							20
21	(Malaysia) Kasma Daniel	Yamaha							11	5					16
22	(India) Sarath Kumar	Honda	14	14	13	16	14	17	17	17	12	13	18	18	16
23	(Thailand) Sittisak Ochawiang	Honda									11	7			14
24	(Japan) Keisuke Maeda	Yamaha					10	11							11
25	(Japan) Ayumu Tanaka	Yamaha			12	15	13	16							8
26	(Australia) Aaron Morris	Yamaha	13	12											7
27	(Chinese Taipei) Lin Chia Hao	Yamaha					15	18							1
28	(Japan) Yoichi Hosono	Yamaha							16	15					1
29	(Thailand) Passawit Thitivararak	Honda											16	19	0
30	(Australia) Broc Pearson	Honda											17	17	0
31	(Thailand) Ratchadda Nakcharoensri	Yamaha											19	Ret	0
32	(Australia) Patrick Li	Yamaha											Ret	Ret	0

Colour	Result
Gold	Winner
Silver	Second place
Bronze	Third place
Green	Points classification
Blue	Non-points classification
Blue	Non-classified finish (NC)
Purple	Retired, not classified (Ret)
Red	Did not qualify (DNQ)
Red	Did not pre-qualify (DNPQ)
Black	Disqualified (DSQ)
White	Did not start (DNS)
White	Withdrew (WD)
White	Race cancelled (C)
Blank	Did not practice (DNP)
Blank	Did not arrive (DNA)
Blank	Excluded (EX)

**Bold** – Pole position
Italics – Fastest lap

==== Asia Production 250 ====
Pos.	Rider	Bike	JOH (Malaysia)		BUR (Thailand)		SUZ (Japan)		SEN (Indonesia)		MAD (India)		BUR (Thailand)		Pts
Pos.	Rider	Bike	R1	R2	R1	R2	R1	R2	R1	R2	R1	R2	R1	R2	Pts
1	(Indonesia) Gerry Salim	Honda	1	1	1	DNS	**1**	**1**	**1**	**1**	22	5	4	3	215
2	(Japan) Tomoyoshi Koyama	Honda	7	4	6	7	3	3	4	3	1	2	3	1	188
3	(Thailand) Anupab Sarmoon	Yamaha	**3**	**2**	2	3	Ret	2	6	4	2	4	**2**	**2**	188
4	(Indonesia) Rheza Danica Ahrens	Honda	4	5	3	2	4	15	2	5	6	7	1	DNS	149
5	(Japan) Takehiro Yamamoto	Honda	2	3	**4**	**1**	2	5	Ret	8	9	3	DNS	14	138
6	(Indonesia) Galang Hendra Pratama	Yamaha	9	9	9	6	12	4	5	7	**3**	**1**	DNS	9	116
7	(Indonesia) Awhin Sanjaya	Honda	5	8	5	4	10	6					9	10	75
8	(Thailand) Peerapong Luiboonpeng	Yamaha	6	7	7	10	Ret	Ret	12	9	Ret	13	6	4	71
9	(Thailand) Peerapong Boonlert	Yamaha	Ret	11	8	8	16	10	8	12	Ret	9	7	5	66
10	(Thailand) Muklada Sarapuech	Honda	15	17	DNS	DNS	5	8	10	19	4	6	8	8	65
11	(Thailand) Vorapong Malahuan	Honda	11	15	10	9	7	Ret			7	10	5	6	64
12	(Indonesia) Andy Muhammad Fadly	Kawasaki	8	6	11	Ret	6	28	15	13	8	8	10	12	63
13	(Indonesia) Reynaldo Ratukore	Yamaha	12	10	16	12	9	7	9	10	5	Ret	13	11	62
14	(Indonesia) Imanuel Putra Pratna	Yamaha	13	Ret	13	Ret	18	11	7	6	10	16	11	13	44
15	(Indonesia) Andi Farid Izdihar	Honda							3	2					36
16	(Japan) Yusuke Nakamura	Yamaha	10	12	Ret	5	15	13	Ret	14			15	17	28
17	(Japan) Soichiro Minamimoto	Yamaha	Ret	14	14	11	8	12	16	15			14	15	25
18	(Malaysia) Ahmad Afiff Amran	Yamaha	17	Ret	20	16	11	9	14	20	11	15	Ret	18	20
19	(Indonesia) Rusman Fadhil	Yamaha	16	13	17	13	25	18	13	16	13	11	Ret	Ret	17
20	(Indonesia) Herman Baharuddin	Honda	14	16	12	14	24	22							8
21	(Malaysia) Fitri Ashraff Razali	Yamaha	Ret	Ret	19	Ret	23	23	21	23	12	12	19	21	8
22	(Indonesia) Richard Taroreh	Yamaha											16	10	6
23	(Indonesia) Rafid Topan Sucipto	Yamaha							11	Ret					5
24	(Indonesia) Yaasin Gabriel Somma	Honda							Ret	11					5
25	(Thailand) Chanachai Boongam	Yamaha											12	Ret	4
26	(Japan) Naoko Takasugi	Yamaha	18	18	15	15	22	Ret	27	21	14	17	17	16	4
27	(Japan) Naoaki Kubo	Yamaha					13	21							3
28	(Japan) Rei Toshima	Yamaha					21	14							2
29	(Japan) Shota Ite	Yamaha					14	20							2
30	(Malaysia) Adib Rosley	Yamaha	20	22	21	19	Ret	DNS	24	26	17	14			2
31	(Malaysia) Afiq Azmi	Yamaha									15	22	24	23	1
32	(Japan) Taiki Fujimura	Kawasaki					20	16							0
33	(Japan) Takashi Suzuki	Yamaha							22	25	16	18			0
34	(Indonesia) Ricky Susanto	Honda							17	17					0
35	(Malaysia) Shafiq Rasol	Yamaha	21	23	18	17	26	27	DNS	Ret	DNS	DNS			0
36	(Japan) Yuta Kasai	Honda					17	19							0
37	(Japan) Shunya Mori	Kawasaki					19	17							0
38	(Indonesia) Wilman Hammer	Yamaha							18	18					0
39	(Vietnam) Bui Duy Thong	Honda	22	21	22	18	29	29	25	28	20	19	25	26	0
40	(Japan) Akito Haga	Yamaha					27	25	19	24	18	20	21	20	0
41	(Thailand) Jirakit Theeranupong	Yamaha											18	Ret	0
42	(India) Sethu Rajiv	Honda	19	19	DNS	DNS	28	24	23	27	19	Ret			0
43	(Thailand) Kanatat Jaiman	Yamaha											Ret	19	0
44	(Chinese Taipei) Hsu Yung Chieh	Yamaha	Ret	DNS	24	20	DNS	30	26	29	21	21			0
45	(Malaysia) Helmi Azman	Yamaha							20	22					0
46	(Malaysia) Haeikal Akmal Zakaria	Yamaha	23	20			30	26							0
47	(Thailand) Akkarak Tesang	Yamaha											20	24	0
48	(Japan) Kenta Fujii	Honda											23	22	0
49	(Vietnam) Tran Thi Doan Trang	Yamaha	Ret	DNS	23	Ret									0
50	(Malaysia) Fareez Afeez	Yamaha											27	25	0
51	(Japan) Ukyo Furuichi	Yamaha											26	Ret	0
52	(Indonesia) Sudarmono	Honda							Ret	Ret					0
53	(Malaysia) Khairul Ikhwan Ajis	Yamaha			DNS	DNS									0
54	(Malaysia) Faiz Zekri Sabri	Yamaha											DNS	DNS	0

Colour	Result
Gold	Winner
Silver	Second place
Bronze	Third place
Green	Points classification
Blue	Non-points classification
Blue	Non-classified finish (NC)
Purple	Retired, not classified (Ret)
Red	Did not qualify (DNQ)
Red	Did not pre-qualify (DNPQ)
Black	Disqualified (DSQ)
White	Did not start (DNS)
White	Withdrew (WD)
White	Race cancelled (C)
Blank	Did not practice (DNP)
Blank	Did not arrive (DNA)
Blank	Excluded (EX)

**Bold** – Pole position
Italics – Fastest lap

==== Underbone 150 ====
Pos.	Rider	Bike	JOH (Malaysia)		BUR (Thailand)		SUZ (Japan)		SEN (Indonesia)		MAD (India)		BUR (Thailand)		Pts
Pos.	Rider	Bike	R1	R2	R1	R2	R1	R2	R1	R2	R1	R2	R1	R2	Pts
1	(Malaysia) Akid Aziz	Yamaha	2	1	Ret	2	2	8	1	4	4	2	11	8	177
2	(Indonesia) Wahyu Aji Trilaksana	Yamaha	**Ret**	**2**	Ret	1	**1**	**7**	**2**	**3**	11	Ret	1	2	165
3	(Malaysia) Haziq Fairues	Yamaha	3	9	6	8	3	3	Ret	9	2	3	3	7	141
4	(Malaysia) Helmi Azman	Yamaha	4	7	3	7	Ret	12	3	2	7	4	7	3	134
5	(Malaysia) Azroy Anuar	Honda	DNS	12	1	10			Ret	5	3	1	**9**	**1**	119
6	(Malaysia) Izzat Zaidi	Yamaha	8	6	2	4	6	5	4	7	10	6	Ret	Ret	110
7	(Malaysia) Fakhrusy Syakirin Rostam	Honda	1	8	Ret	6	Ret	1	11	12	**1**	**Ret**			102
8	(Indonesia) Anggi Setiawan	Yamaha	Ret	3	4	9	4	Ret	8	Ret	5	5	14	5	92
9	(Malaysia) Muzakkir Mohamed	Honda	10	5	7	11	7	2	13	6	DNS	DNS	4	Ret	86
10	(Malaysia) Amirul Ariff Musa	Honda	14	11	10	12	8	4	14	Ret	6	Ret	2	4	83
11	(Malaysia) Hafieenaz Ali	Yamaha	11	DNS	5	3	9	9	10	11	9	8	Ret	Ret	72
12	(Malaysia) Tengku Amirul Haffiruddin	Yamaha	5	4	Ret	5			12	10	8	7			62
13	(Malaysia) Shafiq Rosli	Honda	12	DNS	8	Ret	12	11	18	Ret	12	11	12	10	40
14	(Indonesia) Richard Taroreh	Yamaha							7	1					34
15	(Indonesia) Owie Nurhuda	Yamaha							5	14			5	9	31
16	(Vietnam) Cao Viet Nam	Honda	9	Ret	Ret	DNS	13	13	19	Ret	14	12	13	13	25
17	(Malaysia) Adib Rosley	Yamaha					5	6							21
18	(Indonesia) Wahyu Widodo	Honda							6	8					18
19	(Thailand) Paitoon Nakthong	Yamaha											10	6	16
20	(Malaysia) Affendi Rosli	Honda	7	10											15
21	(Thailand) Suttipat Pachanetorn	Yamaha											6	11	15
22	(China) Yuan Ji Bo	Honda	13	14	9	Ret	Ret	DNS	Ret	17			15	15	14
23	(Malaysia) Norizman Ismail	Yamaha	6	13	**Ret**	**DNS**									13
24	(Malaysia) Sasitharen Sukumaran	Honda					10	10							12
25	(Thailand) Nattawut Rungkigsawas	Honda											8	12	12
26	(Malaysia) Khairul Ikhwan Ajis	Yamaha					11	Ret	17	Ret	ret	10	16	Ret	11
27	(Indonesia) Decky Tiarno Aldy	Honda							9	13					10
28	(India) Prabhu Arunagiri	Honda									13	9			10
29	(Malaysia) Azhar Jalil	Yamaha											Ret	14	2
30	(Indonesia) Wahyu Nugraha	Honda							15	15					2
31	(Indonesia) Dicky Ersa	Yamaha							16	16					0

Colour	Result
Gold	Winner
Silver	Second place
Bronze	Third place
Green	Points classification
Blue	Non-points classification
Blue	Non-classified finish (NC)
Purple	Retired, not classified (Ret)
Red	Did not qualify (DNQ)
Red	Did not pre-qualify (DNPQ)
Black	Disqualified (DSQ)
White	Did not start (DNS)
White	Withdrew (WD)
White	Race cancelled (C)
Blank	Did not practice (DNP)
Blank	Did not arrive (DNA)
Blank	Excluded (EX)

**Bold** – Pole position
Italics – Fastest lap

==== Suzuki Asian Challenge ====
Pos.	Rider	Bike	JOH (Malaysia)		BUR (Thailand)		SUZ (Japan)		SEN (Indonesia)		BUR (Thailand)		Pts
Pos.	Rider	Bike	R1	R2	R1	R2	R1	R2	R1	R2	R1	R2	Pts
1	(Thailand) Punchana Kulrojchalalai	Suzuki GSX R150	11	3	3	9	**1**	**1**	**1**	**2**	**3**	**1**	180
2	(Philippines) April King Mascardo	Suzuki GSX R150	**9**	**1**	1	5	8	Ret	2	6	2	4	139
3	(Japan) Tetsuya Fujita	Suzuki GSX R150	12	2	8	1	6	6	6	3	4	2	136
4	(Indonesia) Ahmad Saugi Muchtar	Suzuki GSX R150	2	Ret	6	3	3	2	3	12	8	8	118
5	(Indonesia) Nur Al Fath	Suzuki GSX R150	3	4	2	7	5	3	Ret	13	7	3	113
6	(Sri Lanka) Aaron Gunawardena	Suzuki GSX R150	4	5	12	2	4	5	7	9	9	10	101
7	(Indonesia) Cheppy Armansyah	Suzuki GSX R150	Ret	6	10	4	10	7	4	4	5	6	91
8	(Philippines) Eane Jaye Sobretodo	Suzuki GSX R150	5	Ret	9	Ret	12	4	5	8	6	7	73
9	(Philippines) Mario Borbon Jr	Suzuki GSX R150	1	8	11	12	11	8	9	10			68
10	(Thailand) Patis Chooprathet	Suzuki GSX R150			**5**	**6**					1	5	57
11	(Australia) Edward Faulkhead	Suzuki GSX R150	7	9	Ret	Ret	7	Ret	8	5	10	11	55
12	(India) K.Y. Ahmed	Suzuki GSX R150	Ret	Ret	4	11	9	Ret	10	7	12	12	48
13	(India) Prabhu Arunagiri	Suzuki GSX R150	8	7	7	10	Ret	11					37
14	(Japan) Takeru Murase	Suzuki GSX R150					2	9					27
15	(Nepal) Bikram Thapa	Suzuki GSX R150			13	8	13	10	13	15	14	Ret	26
16	(Indonesia) Jefri Tosema	Suzuki GSX R150							Ret	1			25
17	(Malaysia) Nazif Nor Samsol	Suzuki GSX R150							11	11	11	13	18
18	(Malaysia) Arfyq Hillman	Suzuki GSX R150	6	10	DNS	DNS							16
19	(India) Jagan Kumar	Suzuki GSX R150									13	9	10
20	(Malaysia) Muhammad Zulhilmi	Suzuki GSX R150	10	Ret	DNS	DNS							6
21	(United Kingdom) Bruce Wilson	Suzuki GSX R150							12	14			6
22	(Malaysia) Anas Ikhwan	Suzuki GSX R150	DNS	DNS									0

Colour	Result
Gold	Winner
Silver	Second place
Bronze	Third place
Green	Points classification
Blue	Non-points classification
Blue	Non-classified finish (NC)
Purple	Retired, not classified (Ret)
Red	Did not qualify (DNQ)
Red	Did not pre-qualify (DNPQ)
Black	Disqualified (DSQ)
White	Did not start (DNS)
White	Withdrew (WD)
White	Race cancelled (C)
Blank	Did not practice (DNP)
Blank	Did not arrive (DNA)
Blank	Excluded (EX)

**Bold** – Pole position
Italics – Fastest lap

=== Teams championship ===
==== Supersport 600 ====
Pos.	Teams	No.	JOH (Malaysia)		BUR (Thailand)		SUZ (Japan)		SEN (Indonesia)		MAD (India)		BUR (Thailand)		Pts.
Pos.	Teams	No.	R1	R2	R1	R2	R1	R2	R1	R2	R1	R2	R1	R2	Pts.
1	Manuel Tech KYT Kawasaki Racing	25	4	2	1	1	4	10	7	9	10	12	5	3	280
1	Manuel Tech KYT Kawasaki Racing	33	7	4	3	4	DNS	13	2	2	7	9	7	10	280
2	Yamaha Thailand Racing Team	65	6	10	2	13	Ret	5	Ret	3	Ret	6	4	4	233
2	Yamaha Thailand Racing Team	24	5	13	**Ret**	**2**			5	1	Ret	5	6	6	233
2	Yamaha Thailand Racing Team	22											**1**	**1**	233
3	RAMA Honda by NTS T-Pro Ten10	23	2	1	Ret	6	6	4	3	12	2	3	9	8	221
3	RAMA Honda by NTS T-Pro Ten10	17	10	9	10	12	12	15	10	14	9	8	13	14	221
3	RAMA Honda by NTS T-Pro Ten10	69	14	14	13	16	14	17	17	17	12	13	18	18	221
3	RAMA Honda by NTS T-Pro Ten10	14											17	17	221
4	Musashi Boon Siew Honda Racing	21	**1**	**Ret**	4	3	3	6	**4**	**DNS**	1	2	10	7	217
4	Musashi Boon Siew Honda Racing	634	9	8	11	11	11	Ret	13	16	4	4	Ret	13	217
5	Yamaha Racing	76	3	11	5	5	2	2	15	7	3	1	Ret	9	173
5	Yamaha Racing	64	Ret	Ret	9	7	Ret	14	9	13	**Ret**	**DNS**	12	16	173
6	AP Honda Racing Thailand	59	Ret	5	6	9	DSQ	9	8	8	5	14	8	11	149
6	AP Honda Racing Thailand	104	11	7	8	8	9	8	12	10			14	15	149
6	AP Honda Racing Thailand	45									11	7			149
7	Akeno Speed Racing	13			DSQ	DSQ	1	1	6	6			2	2	125
7	Akeno Speed Racing	82			12	15	13	16							125
7	Akeno Speed Racing	19	13	12											125
7	Akeno Speed Racing	29											Ret	Ret	125
8	Astra Honda Racing Team	16	8	3	7	14					8	11	15	20	87
8	Astra Honda Racing Team	20							1	4					87
9	K-Max Racing	41	12	6	Ret	10	7	12	14	11	6	10	11	12	65
Pos.	Teams	No.	JOH (Malaysia)		BUR (Thailand)		SUZ (Japan)		SEN (Indonesia)		MAD (India)		BUR (Thailand)		Pts.
Pos.	Teams	No.	R1	R2	R1	R2	R1	R2	R1	R2	R1	R2	R1	R2	Pts.

=== Manufacturers Championship ===
==== Supersport 600 ====
Pos.	Manufacturer	JOH (Malaysia)		BUR (Thailand)		SUZ (Japan)		SEN (Indonesia)		MAD (India)		BUR (Thailand)		Pts.
Pos.	Manufacturer	R1	R2	R1	R2	R1	R2	R1	R2	R1	R2	R1	R2	Pts.
1	(Japan) Yamaha	3	6	2	2	1	1	5	1	3	1	1	1	243
2	(Japan) Honda	1	1	4	3	3	4	1	4	1	2	8	8	207
3	(Japan) Kawasaki	4	2	1	1	4	10	2	2	7	9	3	3	190
4	(Japan) Suzuki					8	3							24

==== Asia Production 250 ====
Pos.	Manufacturer	JOH (Malaysia)		BUR (Thailand)		SUZ (Japan)		SEN (Indonesia)		MAD (India)		BUR (Thailand)		Pts.
Pos.	Manufacturer	R1	R2	R1	R2	R1	R2	R1	R2	R1	R2	R1	R2	Pts.
1	(Japan) Honda	1	1	1	1	1	1	1	1	1	2	1	1	295
2	(Japan) Yamaha	3	2	2	3	8	8	5	4	3	1	2	2	198
3	(Japan) Kawasaki	8	6	11	Ret	6	28	15	13	8	8	10	12	63

==== Underbone 150 ====
Pos.	Manufacturer	JOH (Malaysia)		BUR (Thailand)		SUZ (Japan)		SEN (Indonesia)		MAD (India)		BUR (Thailand)		Pts.
Pos.	Manufacturer	R1	R2	R1	R2	R1	R2	R1	R2	R1	R2	R1	R2	Pts.
1	(Japan) Yamaha	2	1	2	1	1	3	1	1	2	2	1	2	266
2	(Japan) Honda	1	5	1	6	7	1	5	5	1	1	2	1	222

== Extra links ==
- Official website
