= 2016 Asia Road Racing Championship =

21nd season Asia Road Racing Championship

2016 Asia Road Racing Championship
Previous:	2015	Next:	2017

The 2016 FIM Asia Road Racing Championship was the 21nd season of the Asia Road Racing Championship. The Season started on 1 April at Johor Circuit in Malaysia and ended on December 4 at Chang International Circuit in Thailand. this will also be the final year of Asian Dream Cup. The series will merge with Asia Talent Cup This year also marks as final year of Suzuki Satria FU150 in Suzuki Asian Challenge, replaced by Suzuki GSX-R 150 in 2017.

== Calendar and results ==
Round	Circuit	Date	SS600 Winners	AP250 Winners	UB150 Winners	Asia Dream Cup Winners	Suzuki Asian Challenge Winners
1	(Malaysia) Johor Circuit	1–2 April	R1: (Malaysia) Azlan Shah	R1: (Thailand) Apiwat Wongthananon	R1: (Malaysia) Amirul Ariff Musa	R1: (Japan) Hiroki Nakamura	R1: (Indonesia) Jefri Tosema
1	(Malaysia) Johor Circuit	1–2 April	R2: (Malaysia) Azlan Shah	R2: (Thailand) Apiwat Wongthananon	R2: (Malaysia) Izzat Zaidi	R2: (Japan) Hiroki Nakamura	R2: (Malaysia) Rozaliman Zakaria
2	(Thailand) Chang International Circuit	7–8 May	R1: (Japan) Tomoyoshi Koyama	R1: (Thailand) Apiwat Wongthananon	R1: (Indonesia) Wahyu Aji Trilaksana	R1: (Indonesia) Muhammad Febriansyah	R1: (Indonesia) Muhammad Sapril
2	(Thailand) Chang International Circuit	7–8 May	R2: (Malaysia) Zaqhwan Zaidi	R2: (Japan) Takehiro Yamamoto	R2: (Malaysia) Ahmad Fazli Sham	R2: (Japan) Hiroki Nakamura	R2: (Malaysia) Rozaliman Zakaria
3	(Japan) Suzuka Circuit	4–5 June	R1: (Thailand) Decha Kraisart	R1: (Thailand) Apiwat Wongthananon	Did Not Participate	R1: (Japan) Hiroki Nakamura	R1: (Philippines) Eane Jaye Sobretodo
3	(Japan) Suzuka Circuit	4–5 June	R2: (Japan) Yuki Takahashi	R2: (Thailand) Apiwat Wongthananon	Did Not Participate	R2: (Singapore) Azhar Mohammad Noor (Vietnam) Bui Duy Thong	R2: (Indonesia) Muhammad Sapril
4	(Indonesia) Sentul International Circuit	6–7 August	R1: (Indonesia) Gerry Salim	R1: (Japan) Takehiro Yamamoto	R1: (Malaysia) Helmi Azman	R1: (Indonesia) Muhammad Febriansyah	R1: (Indonesia) Jefri Tosema
4	(Indonesia) Sentul International Circuit	6–7 August	R2: (Indonesia) Gerry Salim	R2: (Thailand) Apiwat Wongthananon	R2: (Indonesia) Wahyu Aji Trilaksana	R2: (Japan) Hiroki Nakamura	R2: (Malaysia) Rozaliman Zakaria
5	(India) Buddh International Circuit	1–2 October	R1: (Australia) Anthony West	R1: (Thailand) Apiwat Wongthananon	R1: (Malaysia) Ahmad Fazli Sham	R1: (Japan) Hiroki Nakamura	Did Not Participate
5	(India) Buddh International Circuit	1–2 October	R2: (Australia) Anthony West	R2: (Thailand) Apiwat Wongthananon	R2: (Malaysia) Ahmad Fazli Sham	R2: (Australia) Broc Pearson	Did Not Participate
6	(Thailand) Chang International Circuit	3–4 December	R1: (Thailand) Decha Kraisart	R1: (Thailand) Anupab Sarmoon	R1: (Malaysia) Haziq Fairues	R1: (Indonesia) Yassin Gabriel Somma	R1: (Indonesia) Jefri Tosema
6	(Thailand) Chang International Circuit	3–4 December	R2: (Thailand) Decha Kraisart	R2: (Thailand) Apiwat Wongthananon	R2: (Indonesia) Wahyu Aji Trilaksana	R2: (Japan) Hiroki Nakamura	R2: (Philippines) Mario Borbon Jr

== Teams and riders ==
=== Supersport 600 ===
SS600 Entry List
Team	Constructor	No.	Rider	Rounds
MUSASHI Boon Siew Honda Racing	Honda	1	(Japan) Yuki Takahashi	1–3, 5–6
MUSASHI Boon Siew Honda Racing	Honda	21	(Malaysia) Zaqhwan Zaidi	All
MUSASHI Boon Siew Honda Racing	Honda	34	(Japan) Satoru Iwata	4
Astra Honda Racing Team	Honda	16	(Indonesia) Irfan Ardiansyah	5
Astra Honda Racing Team	Honda	20	(Indonesia) Dimas Ekky Pratama	1–4, 6
Astra Honda Racing Team	Honda	27	(Indonesia) Andi Farid Izdihar	6
Astra Honda Racing Team	Honda	31	(Indonesia) Gerry Salim	1–5
AP Honda Racing Thailand	Honda	46	(Japan) Daijiro Hiura	5
AP Honda Racing Thailand	Honda	59	(Thailand) Ratthapong Wilairot	1–3, 6
AP Honda Racing Thailand	Honda	91	(Thailand) Jakkrit Sawangswat	1–5
AP Honda Racing Thailand	Honda	104	(Japan) Tatsuya Yamaguchi	6
T.Pro Yuzy Honda NTS With WOW	Honda	63	(India) Sarath Kumar	2–5
T.Pro Yuzy Honda NTS With WOW	Honda	71	(Japan) Tomoyoshi Koyama	All
T.Pro Yuzy Honda NTS With WOW	Honda	73	(Japan) Hikari Okubo	6
T.Pro Yuzy Honda NTS With WOW	Honda	77	(Japan) Taiga Hada	All
Honda Tingnote Racing	Honda	100	(Thailand) Thitipong Warokorn	All
BikeART Racing Kawasaki	Kawasaki	25	(Malaysia) Azlan Shah	1–3, 5–6
BikeART Racing Kawasaki	Kawasaki	58	(Malaysia) Akmal Hisham	1
BikeART Racing Kawasaki	Kawasaki	63	(Malaysia) Zulfahmi Khairuddin	6
Manual Tech KYT Kawasaki Racing	Kawasaki	33	(Indonesia) Ahmad Yudhistira	All
Manual Tech KYT Kawasaki Racing	Kawasaki	108	(Indonesia) Andy Muhammad Fadly	All
NCC Speaheart TTS+Mercury	Kawasaki	47	(Japan) Keiji Nakamura	3
Team Kagayama Suzuki Asia	Suzuki	41	(Japan) Noriyuki Haga	All
Team Kagayama Suzuki Asia	Suzuki	98	(Thailand) Patis Chooprathet	All
Team Yamaha Racing	Yamaha	12	(Malaysia) Fitri Ashraff Razali	All
Team Yamaha Racing	Yamaha	76	(Japan) Yuki Ito	All
Akeno Speed WJR Racing Team	Yamaha	13	(Australia) Anthony West	All
Akeno Speed WJR Racing Team	Yamaha	74	(Japan) Makoto Inagaki	3
Yamaha Thailand Racing Team	Yamaha	14	(Thailand) Anucha Nakcharoensri	All
Yamaha Thailand Racing Team	Yamaha	24	(Thailand) Decha Kraisart	All
Yamaha Thailand Racing Team	Yamaha	39	(Thailand) Peerapong Boonlert	2–3
Yamaha Thailand Racing Team	Yamaha	65	(Thailand) Chalermpol Polamai	3, 6
Chunetsu Racing Team	Yamaha	51	(Japan) Yoichi Hosono	4
Finson Motorsports Australia	Yamaha	78	(Australia) Michael Blair	1, 3–4, 6

Key
Regular rider
Wildcard rider
Replacement rider

=== Asia Production 250 ===
AP250 Entry List
Team	Constructor	No.	Rider	Rounds
AP Honda Racing Thailand	Honda	18	(Thailand) Somkiat Chantra	All
AP Honda Racing Thailand	Honda	44	(Thailand) Muklada Sarapuech	6
AP Honda Racing Thailand	Honda	46	(Thailand) Vorapong Malahuan	All
AP Honda Racing Thailand	Honda	91	(Thailand) Sitthisak Onchawiang	All
T.Pro Yuzy Honda NTS With WOW	Honda	20	(Japan) Takumi Hiyama	1–3
T.Pro Yuzy Honda NTS With WOW	Honda	65	(Malaysia) Azroy Anuar	4–6
YSS NJT Honda Racing	Honda	124	(Thailand) Suhathai Chaemsup	1–2
YSS NJT Honda Racing	Honda	199	(Thailand) Punchana Kulrojchalalai	1–2
TRICKSTAR Racing	Kawasaki	1	(Japan) Takehiro Yamamoto	All
TRICKSTAR Racing	Kawasaki	28	(Japan) Takashi Yasuda	3
TRICKSTAR Racing	Kawasaki	82	(Japan) Ayumu Tanaka	All
MOTO RACING & KYOEI With TRICKSTAR	Kawasaki	13	(Japan) Toshihiro Nakazawa	3
Manual Tech KYT Kawasaki Racing	Kawasaki	23	(Indonesia) Gupita Kresna	All
FELDA PB Racing	Kawasaki	66	(Malaysia) Saiful Izman Zamani	2–4
FELDA PB Racing	Kawasaki	98	(Malaysia) Fareez Afeez	1
BikeART Racing Kawasaki	Kawasaki	92	(Malaysia) Muzakkir Mohamed	All
Yamaha Thailand Racing Team	Yamaha	14	(Thailand) Peerapong Loiboonpeng	All
Yamaha Thailand Racing Team	Yamaha	24	(Thailand) Apiwat Wongthananon	All
Yamaha Thailand Racing Team	Yamaha	90	(Thailand) Kanatat Jaiman	6
Yamaha Thailand Racing Team	Yamaha	444	(Thailand) Rathapong Boonlert	6
Yamaha Thailand Racing Team	Yamaha	500	(Thailand) Anupab Sarmoon	All
HITMAN RC KOUSHIEN YAMAHA	Yamaha	17	(Japan) Shota Ite	3
Yamaha Traxx-D TJM Bien Racing	Yamaha	21	(Indonesia) Isyam Satrio	All
Yamaha Traxx-D TJM Bien Racing	Yamaha	32	(Malaysia) Hasyim Zaki Adil	4
Yamaha Traxx-D TJM Bien Racing	Yamaha	93	(Thailand) Paitoon Nakthong	2
Yamaha Traxx-D TJM Bien Racing	Yamaha	96	(Indonesia) Imanuel Putra Pratna	All
Akeno Speed WJR Racing Team	Yamaha	22	(Japan) Soichiro Minamimoto	All
Akeno Speed WJR Racing Team	Yamaha	33	(Japan) Yusuke Nakamura	All
BKMS JDS Racing Team	Yamaha	27	(Indonesia) Rusman Fadhil	All
BKMS JDS Racing Team	Yamaha	61	(Indonesia) Ferlando Herdian	All
Team One For All	Yamaha	36	(Malaysia) Affendi Rosli	1–5
Team One For All	Yamaha	39	(Thailand) Peerapong Boonlert	6
Team One For All	Yamaha	750	(Japan) Naoko Takasugi	All
Yamaha Finson Racing	Yamaha	37	(Australia) Jack Mahaffy	1–3, 5–6
Yamaha Finson Racing	Yamaha	76	(Indonesia) Hendriansyah	4
Yamaha Finson Racing	Yamaha	127	(Malaysia) Kasma Daniel	All
Hong Leong Yamaha	Yamaha	50	(Malaysia) Ahmad Afiff Amran	All
Yamaha Akal Jaya	Yamaha	57	(Indonesia) Janoer Deden	4
Team NAP'S	Yamaha	77	(Japan) Rei Toshima	3
Yamaha Racing Indonesia	Yamaha	99	(Indonesia) Galang Hendra Pratama	All
Yamaha Racing Indonesia	Yamaha	222	(Indonesia) Reynaldo Ratukore	All
RCB Kage Motobatt Yamaha YYPang	Yamaha	118	(Malaysia) Amirul Haffiruddin	1–4, 6
RCB Kage Motobatt Yamaha YYPang	Yamaha	198	(Malaysia) Izzat Zaidi	5
Yamaha Yamalube NHK IRC	Yamaha	150	(Indonesia) Wilman Hammar	4
Yamaha Yamalube NHK IRC	Yamaha	190	(Indonesia) Syahrul Amin	4
Yamaha MRT Kalbar	Yamaha	202	(Indonesia) Syarif Alkhadrie	4

Key
Regular rider
Wildcard rider
Replacement rider

=== Underbone 130 ===
UB130 Entry List
Team	Constructor	No.	Rider	Rounds
Harian Metro YTEQ SCK Honda Racing	Honda	19	(Malaysia) Norizman Ismail	1–2, 4–6
Harian Metro YTEQ SCK Honda Racing	Honda	93	(Malaysia) Nazirul Izzat Bahauddin	1–2, 4–6
T.Pro Yuzy Honda NTS	Honda	20	(Malaysia) Azroy Anuar	1–2
T.Pro Yuzy Honda NTS	Honda	22	(Malaysia) Sasitharen Sukumaran	4–6
T.Pro Yuzy Honda NTS	Honda	63	(Malaysia) Amirul Ariff Musa	1–2, 4–6
T.Pro Yuzy Honda NTS	Honda	95	(Vietnam) Bui Duy Thong	1–2
T.Pro Yuzy Honda NTS	Honda	96	(Vietnam) Cao Viet Nam	4–6
FELDA PB Racing	Yamaha	11	(Malaysia) Iqbal Amri Malik	1–2
FELDA PB Racing	Yamaha	33	(Malaysia) Khairil Hisham	1–2, 4–6
FELDA PB Racing	Yamaha	38	(Malaysia) Aziamizat Sumairy	6
FELDA PB Racing	Yamaha	65	(Malaysia) Saiful Izman Zamani	5
RCB KAGE Motobatt Yamaha YYPang	Yamaha	18	(Malaysia) Adib Rosley	1–2, 4–6
RCB KAGE Motobatt Yamaha YYPang	Yamaha	98	(Malaysia) Izzat Zaidi	1–2, 4–6
UMA Racing Yamaha Maju Motor	Yamaha	26	(Malaysia) Haziq Fairues	1–2, 4–6
UMA Racing Yamaha Maju Motor	Yamaha	46	(Malaysia) Ahmad Fazli Sham	1–2, 4–6
IUGB AFB Tech Racing	Yamaha	55	(Malaysia) Helmi Azman	4
IUGB AFB Tech Racing	Yamaha	55	(Malaysia) Helmi Azman	5
IUGB AFB Tech Racing	Yamaha	56	(Malaysia) Irfan Rosnizam	1–2, 4
IUGB AFB Tech Racing	Yamaha	65	(Malaysia) Saiful Izman Zamani	1
IUGB AFB Tech Racing	Yamaha	66	(Malaysia) Danial Syahmi	6
IUGB AFB Tech Racing	Yamaha	99	(Malaysia) Fareez Afeez	2, 4–6
TPK48 BKMS Indonesia	Yamaha	60	(Indonesia) Wahyu Aji Trilaksana	1–2, 4–6
Malioboro City Jogjakarta TPK48 BKMS	Yamaha	92	(Indonesia) Florianus Roy	1–2, 4–6
Yamaha T-Rax-D TJM Bien Racing	Yamaha	131	(Indonesia) Wahyu Nugraha	4
R7 Racing Tech	Yamaha	179	(Indonesia) Richard Taroreh	4

Key
Regular rider
Wildcard rider
Replacement rider

==== Asia Dream Cup ====
Asia Dream Cup Entry List
Constructor	Bike	No.	Rider	Rounds
Honda	Honda CBR250RR	1	(Malaysia) Hafiz Nor Azman	All
Honda	Honda CBR250RR	2	(Japan) Hiroki Nakamura	All
Honda	Honda CBR250RR	3	(Japan) Tokio Shibuta	3–6
Honda	Honda CBR250RR	4	(Malaysia) Harith Farhan	1–2, 4–6
Honda	Honda CBR250RR	5	(Indonesia) Muhammad Febriansyah	All
Honda	Honda CBR250RR	6	(Thailand) Woraphod Niamsakhonsakul	All
Honda	Honda CBR250RR	7	(Australia) Broc Pearson	All
Honda	Honda CBR250RR	8	(China) Zhou Sheng Jun Jie	All
Honda	Honda CBR250RR	9	(Indonesia) Yaasin Gabriel Somma	All
Honda	Honda CBR250RR	10	(Sri Lanka) Jaden Gunawardena	All
Honda	Honda CBR250RR	11	(Singapore) Azhar Noor	All
Honda	Honda CBR250RR	12	(Thailand) Sittipon Srimoontree	All
Honda	Honda CBR250RR	13	(Philippines) Masaharu Tadachi	All
Honda	Honda CBR250RR	14	(Australia) Corey Briffa	All
Honda	Honda CBR250RR	15	(Vietnam) Bui Duy Thong	All
Honda	Honda CBR250RR	16	(Chinese Taipei) You Tz Jiun	All
Honda	Honda CBR250RR	17	(India) Hari Krishnan	All
Honda	Honda CBR250RR	18	(India) Sethu Rajiv	All
Honda	Honda CBR250RR	21	(India) Mathanakumar	5
Honda	Honda CBR250RR	113	(Japan) Chisato Katayama	3

==== Suzuki Asian Challenge ====
Asia Dream Cup Entry List
Constructor	Bike	No.	Rider	Rounds
Suzuki	Suzuki Satria FU150	5	(India) Jagan Kumar	3–4, 6
Suzuki	Suzuki Satria FU150	11	(Japan) Maxi Hattori	1–4, 6
Suzuki	Suzuki Satria FU150	12	(Malaysia) Rozaliman Zakaria	1–4, 6
Suzuki	Suzuki Satria FU150	14	(Singapore) Arsyad Rusydi	1–4, 6
Suzuki	Suzuki Satria FU150	20	(Indonesia) Jefri Tosema	1–4, 6
Suzuki	Suzuki Satria FU150	21	(Vietnam) Nguyen Ngoc Ho	1–4
Suzuki	Suzuki Satria FU150	22	(Philippines) Eane Jaye Solacito	1–4, 6
Suzuki	Suzuki Satria FU150	23	(India) Kannan Subramaniam	1–3
Suzuki	Suzuki Satria FU150	27	(Japan) Shinnosuke Sato	1–4, 6
Suzuki	Suzuki Satria FU150	29	(Philippines) Mario Borbon Jr	1–4, 6
Suzuki	Suzuki Satria FU150	30	(Indonesia) Rizal Feriyadi	1–4, 6
Suzuki	Suzuki Satria FU150	39	(Vietnam) Nguyen Hoang Anh Dung	6
Suzuki	Suzuki Satria FU150	41	(Japan) Akito Haga	1–4, 6
Suzuki	Suzuki Satria FU150	43	(Philippines) April King Mascardo	1–4, 6
Suzuki	Suzuki Satria FU150	46	(Sri Lanka) Aaron Alexander	1–4, 6
Suzuki	Suzuki Satria FU150	50	(India) Mithun Kumar	2
Suzuki	Suzuki Satria FU150	78	(Malaysia) Iqbal Azhar	1–2
Suzuki	Suzuki Satria FU150	81	(Thailand) Nattapat Suprasertkarnkit	6
Suzuki	Suzuki Satria FU150	87	(Indonesia) Muhammad Sapril	1–4, 6
Suzuki	Suzuki Satria FU150	96	(Nepal) Bikram Thapa	2–4, 6

== Championship Standings ==
Points

Position	**1st**	**2nd**	**3rd**	**4th**	**5th**	**6th**	**7th**	**8th**	**9th**	**10th**	**11th**	**12th**	**13th**	**14th**	**15th**
Points	25	20	16	13	11	10	9	8	7	6	5	4	3	2	1

=== Riders standings ===
==== Supersport 600 ====
Pos.	Rider	Bike	JOH (Malaysia)		BUR (Thailand)		SUZ (Japan)		SEN (Indonesia)		BUD (India)		BUR (Thailand)		Pts
Pos.	Rider	Bike	R1	R2	R1	R2	R1	R2	R1	R2	R1	R2	R1	R2	Pts
1	(Malaysia) Zaqhwan Zaidi	Honda	**3**	**3**	**2**	**1**	9	5	3	2	14	6	7	6	162
2	(Japan) Tomoyoshi Koyama	Honda	2	5	1	4	3	2	4	4	6	7	8	Ret	158
3	(Malaysia) Azlan Shah	Kawasaki	1	1	8	2	5	DNS			5	3	4	4	142
4	(Japan) Yuki Takahashi	Honda	9	2	3	3	**2**	**1**			4	5	20	8	136
5	(Thailand) Decha Kraisart	Yamaha	Ret	12	Ret	11	1	Ret	5	Ret	2	2	1	1	135
6	(Australia) Anthony West	Yamaha	7	8	5	10	10	Ret	Ret	7	**1**	**1**	5	3	126
7	(Indonesia) Dimas Ekky Pratama	Honda	4	7	7	7	4	6	2	3			6	5	120
8	(Indonesia) Ahmad Yudhistira	Kawasaki	11	6	4	Ret	7	4	Ret	5	3	8	9	7	101
9	(Indonesia) Gerry Salim	Honda	Ret	4	6	6	11	10	**1**	**1**	12	Ret			98
10	(Japan) Taiga Hada	Honda	5	10	9	8	14	7	7	6	Ret	10	19	10	74
11	(Thailand) Anucha Nakcharoensri	Yamaha	10	Ret	13	5	Ret	DNS	13	13	7	4	3	9	71
12	(Japan) Noriyuki Haga	Suzuki	14	13	12	12	12	8	10	8	10	11	12	Ret	54
13	(Japan) Yuki Ito	Yamaha	15	17	14	17	6	3	DNS	DNS	9	9	10	Ret	49
14	(Thailand) Ratthapong Wilairot	Honda	6	9	Ret	9	8	9					11	12	48
15	(Thailand) Thitipong Warokorn	Honda	8	11	10	14	17	13	6	Ret	11	12	Ret	17	43
16	(Thailand) Chalermpol Polamai	Yamaha					18	Ret					**2**	**2**	40
17	(Thailand) Jakkrit Sawangswat	Honda	13	18	Ret	13	15	12	8	9	17	Ret			26
18	(Malaysia) Fitri Ashraff Razali	Yamaha	12	16	16	16	19	19	11	12	15	14	15	15	18
19	(Thailand) Patis Chooprathet	Suzuki	Ret	19	15	15	21	17	12	11	Ret	DNS	13	13	17
20	(Japan) Satoru Iwata	Honda							9	10					13
21	(Indonesia) Andy Muhammad Fadly	Kawasaki	16	14	17	18	22	16	Ret	14	13	13	Ret	Ret	10
22	(Japan) Daijiro Hiura	Honda									8	16			8
23	(Japan) Makoto Inagaki	Yamaha					13	11							8
24	(Thailand) Peerapong Boonlert	Yamaha			11	Ret	20	18							5
25	(Indonesia) Andi Farid Izdihar	Honda											21	11	5
26	(Japan) Tatsuya Yamaguchi	Honda											14	14	4
27	(Australia) Michael Blair	Yamaha	17	15			Ret	15	DNS	15			18	18	3
28	(Japan) Keiji Nakamura	Kawasaki					16	14							2
29	(Japan) Yoichi Hosono	Yamaha							14	16					2
30	(Indonesia) Irfan Ardiansyah	Honda									16	15			1
31	(India) Sarath Kumar	Honda			DNS	DNS	23	DNS	15	17	DNS	DNS			1
32	(Malaysia) Akmal Hisham	Kawasaki	Ret	Ret											0
Riders ineligible for points due to competing full time in other series
-	(Malaysia) Zulfahmi Khairuddin	Kawasaki											15	12	–
-	(Japan) Hikari Okubo	Honda											12	19	–

Colour	Result
Gold	Winner
Silver	Second place
Bronze	Third place
Green	Points classification
Blue	Non-points classification
Blue	Non-classified finish (NC)
Purple	Retired, not classified (Ret)
Red	Did not qualify (DNQ)
Red	Did not pre-qualify (DNPQ)
Black	Disqualified (DSQ)
White	Did not start (DNS)
White	Withdrew (WD)
White	Race cancelled (C)
Blank	Did not practice (DNP)
Blank	Did not arrive (DNA)
Blank	Excluded (EX)

**Bold** – Pole position
Italics – Fastest lap

==== Asia Production 250 ====
Pos.	Rider	Bike	JOH (Malaysia)		BUR (Thailand)		SUZ (Japan)		SEN (Indonesia)		BUD (India)		BUR (Thailand)		Pts
Pos.	Rider	Bike	R1	R2	R1	R2	R1	R2	R1	R2	R1	R2	R1	R2	Pts
1	(Thailand) Apiwat Wongthananon	Yamaha	**1**	**1**	1	5	1	1	6	1	**1**	**1**	**23**	**1**	246
2	(Japan) Takehiro Yamamoto	Kawasaki	5	7	11	1	**2**	**2**	**1**	**2**	3	Ret	21	2	171
3	(Thailand) Anupab Sarmoon	Yamaha	3	3	9	4	4	5	4	8	2	5	1	4	166
4	(Thailand) Peerapong Loiboonpeng	Yamaha	2	2	**2**	**3**	7	17	8	5	12	6	2	6	148
5	(Indonesia) Galang Hendra Pratama	Yamaha	8	4	4	2	23	9	Ret	7	5	3	7	16	106
6	(Japan) Yusuke Nakamura	Yamaha	4	6	10	7	6	7	11	3	11	19	3	17	99
7	(Thailand) Somkiat Chantra	Honda	9	10	3	Ret	22	12	3	10	6	16	4	9	85
8	(Indonesia) Imanuel Putra Pratna	Yamaha	22	22	22	18	9	4	5	4	9	10	5	3	84
9	(Thailand) Vorapong Malahuan	Honda	14	19	Ret	14	8	6	2	6	4	4	14	12	84
10	(Japan) Ayumu Tanaka	Kawasaki	Ret	9	5	Ret	5	3	9	27	10	Ret	Ret	10	64
11	(Thailand) Sitthisak Onchawiang	Honda	15	15	7	10	24	16	10	Ret	8	2	Ret	8	59
12	(Malaysia) Kasma Daniel	Yamaha	7	8	17	9	Ret	11	Ret	15	13	7	17	5	53
13	(Japan) Soichiro Minamimoto	Yamaha	10	12	6	6	12	10	18	12	7	Ret	18	18	53
14	(Indonesia) Reynaldo Ratukore	Yamaha	13	13	14	8	Ret	8	Ret	16	Ret	12	8	27	36
15	(Malaysia) Muzakkir Mohamed	Kawasaki	11	14	8	11	13	15	Ret	20	14	9	Ret	14	35
16	(Indonesia) Ferlando Herdian	Yamaha	21	Ret	20	16	11	13	7	9	DNS	DNS	9	20	31
17	(Malaysia) Ahmad Afiff Amran	Yamaha	19	18	12	13	10	19	12	11	15	Ret	Ret	13	26
18	(Thailand) Suhathai Chaemsup	Honda	6	5	16	Ret									21
19	(Japan) Takashi Yasuda	Kawasaki					3	23							16
20	(Thailand) Punchana Kulrojchalalai	Honda	12	11	Ret	12									13
21	(Indonesia) Gupita Kresna	Kawasaki	18	16	15	Ret	Ret	18	16	Ret	Ret	11	11	15	12
22	(Malaysia) Azroy Anuar	Honda							13	17	16	8	Ret	Ret	11
23	(Thailand) Kanatat Jaiman	Yamaha											6	22	10
24	(Indonesia) Rusman Fadhil	Yamaha	25	26	DNS	Ret	14	14	Ret	Ret	21	20	10	25	10
25	(Thailand) Rathapong Boonlert	Yamaha											Ret	7	9
26	(Japan) Naoko Takasugi	Yamaha	17	20	13	17	18	Ret	22	25	18	15	12	19	8
27	(Thailand) Peerapong Boonlert	Yamaha											20	11	5
28	(Malaysia) Affendi Rosli	Yamaha	20	17	19	15	19	24	21	24	17	13			4
29	(Indonesia) Wilman Hammar	Yamaha							17	13					3
30	(Indonesia) Syahrul Amin	Yamaha							Ret	23			13	23	3
31	(Indonesia) Hasyim Zaki adil	Yamaha							14	18					2
32	(Indonesia) Janoer Deden	Yamaha							20	14					2
33	(Indonesia) Isyam Satrio	Yamaha	26	25	23	22	DNS	DNS	19	19	DNS	14	19	26	2
34	(Malaysia) Saiful Izman Zamani	Kawasaki			24	21	15	22	23	26					1
35	(Indonesia) Hendriansyah	Yamaha							15	21					1
36	(Thailand) Muklada Sarapuech	Honda											15	21	1
37	(Australia) Jack Mahaffy	Yamaha	24	21	25	20	20	26			19	17	16	24	0
38	(Japan) Rei Toshima	Yamaha					16	20							0
39	(Malaysia) Fareez Afeez	Kawasaki	16	24											0
40	(Japan) Shota Ite	Yamaha					17	21							0
41	(Malaysia) Izzat Zaidi	Yamaha									20	18			0
42	(Thailand) Paitoon Nakthong	Yamaha			18	Ret									0
43	(Japan) Takumi Hiyama	Honda	27	27	Ret	19	21	27							0
44	(Malaysia) Amirul Haffiruddin	Yamaha	23	23	21	Ret	Ret	25	24	22			22	Ret	0
45	(Japan) Toshihiro Nakazawa	Kawasaki					Ret	DNS							0
46	(Indonesia) Syarif Alkhadrie	Yamaha							DNS	DNS					0

Colour	Result
Gold	Winner
Silver	Second place
Bronze	Third place
Green	Points classification
Blue	Non-points classification
Blue	Non-classified finish (NC)
Purple	Retired, not classified (Ret)
Red	Did not qualify (DNQ)
Red	Did not pre-qualify (DNPQ)
Black	Disqualified (DSQ)
White	Did not start (DNS)
White	Withdrew (WD)
White	Race cancelled (C)
Blank	Did not practice (DNP)
Blank	Did not arrive (DNA)
Blank	Excluded (EX)

**Bold** – Pole position
Italics – Fastest lap

==== Underbone 130 ====
Pos.	Rider	Bike	JOH (Malaysia)		BUR (Thailand)		SEN (Indonesia)		BUD (India)		BUR (Thailand)		Pts
Pos.	Rider	Bike	R1	R2	R1	R2	R1	R2	R1	R2	R1	R2	Pts
1	(Indonesia) Wahyu Aji Trilaksana	Yamaha	5	Ret	1	2	**9**	**1**	**11**	**2**	5	1	149
2	(Malaysia) Amirul Ariff Musa	Honda	1	5	5	6	3	6	2	13	3	5	133
3	(Malaysia) Izzat Zaidi	Yamaha	2	1	4	5	4	Ret	3	7	6	Ret	117
4	(Malaysia) Ahmad Fazli Sham	Yamaha	8	9	Ret	1	Ret	2	1	1	Ret	11	115
5	(Indonesia) Florianus Roy	Yamaha	Ret	7	3	3	Ret	5	Ret	4	2	2	105
6	(Malaysia) Norizman Ismail	Honda	6	2	6	Ret	Ret	3	7	6	9	6	92
7	(Malaysia) Haziq Fairues	Yamaha	3	Ret	2	Ret	Ret	9	Ret	3	**1**	**9**	91
8	(Malaysia) Nazirul Izzat Bahauddin	Honda	4	6	8	7	7	10	6	8	Ret	8	81
9	(Malaysia) Khairil Hisham	Yamaha	Ret	Ret	7	11	8	8	4	9	4	3	79
10	(Malaysia) Adib Rosley	Yamaha	DNS	4	**Ret**	**4**	Ret	Ret	5	5	8	7	65
11	(Malaysia) Fareez Afeez	Yamaha			9	8	Ret	Ret	9	11	7	4	49
12	(Malaysia) Helmi Azman	Yamaha					1	7	12	Ret			38
13	(Indonesia) Wahyu Nugraha	Yamaha					2	4					33
14	(Malaysia) Iqbal Amri Malik	Yamaha	9	3	10	Ret							29
15	(Malaysia) Azroy Anuar	Honda	**7**	**8**	11	10							28
16	(Malaysia) Sasitharen Sukumaran	Honda					5	Ret	8	10	Ret	Ret	25
17	(Malaysia) Irfan Rosnizam	Yamaha	Ret	10	Ret	9	6	Ret					23
18	(Vietnam) Cao Viet Nam	Honda					10	Ret	10	12	Ret	10	22
19	(Vietnam) Bui Duy Thong	Honda	11	12	12	12							17
20	(Malaysia) Saiful Izman Zamani	Yamaha	10	11					13	DNS			14
21	(Malaysia) Aziamizat Sumairy	Yamaha									10	Ret	6
22	(Malaysia) Danial Syahmi	Yamaha									11	Ret	5
23	(Indonesia) Richard Taroreh	Yamaha					Ret	Ret					0

Colour	Result
Gold	Winner
Silver	Second place
Bronze	Third place
Green	Points classification
Blue	Non-points classification
Blue	Non-classified finish (NC)
Purple	Retired, not classified (Ret)
Red	Did not qualify (DNQ)
Red	Did not pre-qualify (DNPQ)
Black	Disqualified (DSQ)
White	Did not start (DNS)
White	Withdrew (WD)
White	Race cancelled (C)
Blank	Did not practice (DNP)
Blank	Did not arrive (DNA)
Blank	Excluded (EX)

**Bold** – Pole position
Italics – Fastest lap

==== Asia Dream Cup ====
Pos.	Rider	Bike	JOH (Malaysia)		BUR (Thailand)		SUZ (Japan)		SEN (Indonesia)		BUD (India)		BUR (Thailand)		Pts
Pos.	Rider	Bike	R1	R2	R1	R2	R1	R2	R1	R2	R1	R2	R1	R2	Pts
1	(Japan) Hiroki Nakamura	Honda CBR250RR	**1**	**1**	2	1	1	Ret	**4**	**1**	1	17	2	1	228
2	(Malaysia) Hafiz Nor Azman	Honda CBR250RR	2	2	**3**	**6**	DNS	DNS	3	4	5	3	14	2	144
3	(Indonesia) Muhammad Febriansyah	Honda CBR250RR	17	4	1	Ret	8	2	1	8	3	7	3	4	143
4	(Australia) Broc Pearson	Honda CBR250RR	4	5	10	3	3	2	8	7	**18**	**1**	**Ret**	**8**	122
5	(Philippines) Masaharu Tadachi	Honda CBR250RR	5	EXC	4	4	4	4	6	3	4	5	12	5	121.5
6	(Indonesia) Yaasin Gabriel Somma	Honda CBR250RR	10	10	8	8	10	Ret	5	5	2	12	1	3	121
7	(China) Zhou Shen Jun Jie	Honda CBR250RR	6	7	7	13	9	3	2	2	9	8	8	10	115
8	(Thailand) Sittipon Srimoontree	Honda CBR250RR	15	9	5	7	**5**	**Ret**	11	9	6	2	5	9	99
9	(Thailand) Worapod Niamsakhonsakul	Honda CBR250RR	7	6	Ret	5	**2**	**Ret**	10	11	12	10	4	6	94
10	(Malaysia) Harith Farhan	Honda CBR250RR	3	3	Ret	14			7	6	8	6	7	11	85
11	(India) Hari Krishnan	Honda CBR250RR	14	11	11	2	13	3	Ret	10	7	11	6	14	75
12	(Japan) Tokio Shibuta	Honda CBR250RR					6	Ret	9	12	11	4	Ret	7	48
13	(Vietnam) Bui Duy Thong	Honda CBR250RR	11	14	6	Ret	16	1	Ret	Ret	14	9	Ret	12	42.5
14	(Singapore) Azhar Noor	Honda CBR250RR	9	8	Ret	12	11	1	Ret	14					38.5
15	(Sri Lanka) Jaden Gunawardena	Honda CBR250RR	12	13	9	11	15	Ret	12	13	15	13	10	16	37
16	(India) Sethu Rajiv	Honda CBR250RR	8	15	Ret	9	12	Ret	Ret	16	10	Ret	9	13	36
17	(Australia) Corey Briffa	Honda CBR250RR	13	12	Ret	10	14	Ret	13	15	16	14	11	15	27
18	(Japan) Chisato Katayama	Honda CBR250RR					7	4							15.5
19	(Chinese Taipei) You Tz Jiun	Honda CBR250RR	16	16	Ret	15	17	Ret	14	Ret	17	16	13	17	6
20	(India) Mathnakumar	Honda CBR250RR									13	15			4

Colour	Result
Gold	Winner
Silver	Second place
Bronze	Third place
Green	Points classification
Blue	Non-points classification
Blue	Non-classified finish (NC)
Purple	Retired, not classified (Ret)
Red	Did not qualify (DNQ)
Red	Did not pre-qualify (DNPQ)
Black	Disqualified (DSQ)
White	Did not start (DNS)
White	Withdrew (WD)
White	Race cancelled (C)
Blank	Did not practice (DNP)
Blank	Did not arrive (DNA)
Blank	Excluded (EX)

**Bold** – Pole position
Italics – Fastest lap

=== Teams Championship ===
==== Supersport 600 ====
Pos.	Teams	No.	JOH (Malaysia)		BUR (Thailand)		SUZ (Japan)		SEN (Indonesia)		MAD (India)		BUR (Thailand)		Pts.
Pos.	Teams	No.	R1	R2	R1	R2	R1	R2	R1	R2	R1	R2	R1	R2	Pts.
1	MUSASHI Boon Siew Honda Racing	21	**3**	**3**	**2**	**1**	9	5	3	2	14	6	7	6	311
1	MUSASHI Boon Siew Honda Racing	1	9	2	3	3	**2**	**1**			4	5	20	8	311
1	MUSASHI Boon Siew Honda Racing	34							9	10					311
2	T.Pro Yuzy Honda NTS With WOW	71	2	5	1	4	3	2	4	4	6	7	8	Ret	233
2	T.Pro Yuzy Honda NTS With WOW	77	5	10	9	8	14	7	7	6	Ret	10	19	10	233
2	T.Pro Yuzy Honda NTS With WOW	63			DNS	DNS	23	DNS	15	17	DNS	DNS			233
2	T.Pro Yuzy Honda NTS With WOW	73											12	19	233
3	Astra Honda Racing Team	20	4	7	7	7	4	6	2	3			6	5	224
3	Astra Honda Racing Team	31	Ret	4	6	6	11	10	**1**	**1**	12	Ret			224
3	Astra Honda Racing Team	27											21	11	224
3	Astra Honda Racing Team	16									16	15			224
4	Yamaha Thailand Racing Team	24	Ret	12	Ret	11	1	Ret	5	Ret	2	2	1	1	206
4	Yamaha Thailand Racing Team	14	10	Ret	13	5	Ret	DNS	13	13	7	4	3	9	206
5	BikeART Racing Kawasaki	25	1	1	8	2	5	DNS			5	3	4	4	142
6	Akeno Speed WJR Racing Team	13	7	8	5	10	10	Ret	Ret	7	**1**	**1**	5	3	126
7	Manual Tech KYT Kawasaki Racing	33	11	6	4	Ret	7	4	Ret	5	3	8	9	7	111
7	Manual Tech KYT Kawasaki Racing	108	16	14	17	18	22	16	Ret	14	13	13	Ret	Ret	111
8	AP Honda Racing Thailand	59	6	9	Ret	9	8	9					11	12	86
8	AP Honda Racing Thailand	91	13	18	Ret	13	15	12	8	9	17	Ret			86
8	AP Honda Racing Thailand	46									8	16			86
8	AP Honda Racing Thailand	104											14	14	86
9	Team Kagayama Suzuki Asia	41	14	13	12	12	12	8	10	8	10	11	12	Ret	71
9	Team Kagayama Suzuki Asia	98	Ret	19	15	15	21	17	12	11	Ret	DNS	13	13	71
10	Team Yamaha Racing	76	15	17	14	17	6	3	DNS	DNS	9	9	10	Ret	67
10	Team Yamaha Racing	12	12	16	16	16	19	19	11	12	15	14	15	15	67
11	Honda Tingnote Racing	100	8	11	10	14	17	13	6	Ret	11	12	Ret	17	43
12	Finson Motorsports Australia	78	17	15			Ret	15	DNS	15			18	18	3

==== Asia Production 250 ====
Pos.	Teams	No.	JOH (Malaysia)		BUR (Thailand)		SUZ (Japan)		SEN (Indonesia)		MAD (India)		BUR (Thailand)		Pts.
Pos.	Teams	No.	R1	R2	R1	R2	R1	R2	R1	R2	R1	R2	R1	R2	Pts.
1	Yamaha Thailand Racing Team	24	**1**	**1**	1	5	1	1	6	1	**1**	**1**	**23**	**1**	560
1	Yamaha Thailand Racing Team	500	3	3	9	4	4	5	4	8	2	5	1	4	560
1	Yamaha Thailand Racing Team	14	2	2	**2**	**3**	7	17	8	5	12	6	2	6	560
2	TRICKSTAR Racing	1	5	7	11	1	**2**	**2**	**1**	**2**	3	Ret	21	2	235
2	TRICKSTAR Racing	82	Ret	9	5	Ret	5	3	9	27	10	Ret	Ret	10	235
3	AP Honda Racing Thailand	18	9	10	3	Ret	22	12	3	10	6	16	4	9	228
3	AP Honda Racing Thailand	46	14	19	Ret	14	8	6	2	6	4	4	14	12	228
3	AP Honda Racing Thailand	91	15	15	7	10	24	16	10	Ret	8	2	Ret	8	228
4	Akeno Speed WJR Racing Team	33	4	6	10	7	6	7	11	3	11	19	3	17	152
4	Akeno Speed WJR Racing Team	22	10	12	6	6	12	10	18	12	7	Ret	18	18	152
5	Yamaha Racing Indonesia	99	8	4	4	2	23	9	Ret	7	5	3	7	16	142
5	Yamaha Racing Indonesia	222	13	13	14	8	Ret	8	Ret	16	Ret	12	8	27	142
6	Yamaha Traxx-D TJM Bien Racing	96	22	22	22	18	9	4	5	4	9	10	5	3	86
6	Yamaha Traxx-D TJM Bien Racing	21	26	25	23	22	DNS	DNS	19	19	DNS	14	19	26	86
7	Yamaha Finson Racing	127	7	8	17	9	Ret	11	Ret	15	13	7	17	5	54
7	Yamaha Finson Racing	76							15	21					54
7	Yamaha Finson Racing	37	24	21	25	20	20	26			19	17	16	24	54
8	BKMS JDS Racing Team	61	21	Ret	20	16	11	13	7	9	DNS	DNS	9	20	41
8	BKMS JDS Racing Team	27	25	26	DNS	Ret	14	14	Ret	Ret	21	20	10	25	41
9	BikeART Racing Kawasaki	92	11	14	8	11	13	15	Ret	20	14	9	Ret	14	35
10	YSS NJT Honda Racing	124	6	5	16	Ret									34
10	YSS NJT Honda Racing	199	12	11	Ret	12									34
11	Hong Leong Yamaha	50	19	18	12	13	10	19	12	11	15	Ret	Ret	13	26
12	Team One For All	750	17	20	13	17	18	Ret	22	25	18	15	12	19	17
12	Team One For All	39											20	11	17
12	Team One For All	36	20	17	19	15	19	24	21	24	17	13			17
13	Manual Tech KYT Kawasaki Racing	23	18	16	15	Ret	Ret	18	16	Ret	Ret	11	11	15	12
14	T.Pro Yuzy Honda NTS With WOW	65							13	17	16	8	Ret	Ret	11
14	T.Pro Yuzy Honda NTS With WOW	20	27	27	Ret	19	21	27							11
15	FELDA PB Racing	66			24	21	15	22	23	26					1
15	FELDA PB Racing	98	16	24											1
16	RCB Kage Motobatt Yamaha YYPang	198									20	18			0
16	RCB Kage Motobatt Yamaha YYPang	118	23	23	21	Ret	Ret	25	24	22			22	Ret	0

==== Underbone 130 ====
Pos.	Teams	No.	JOH (Malaysia)		BUR (Thailand)		SEN (Indonesia)		MAD (India)		BUR (Thailand)		Pts.
Pos.	Teams	No.	R1	R2	R1	R2	R1	R2	R1	R2	R1	R2	Pts.
1	UMA Racing Yamaha Maju Motor	46	8	9	Ret	1	Ret	2	1	1	Ret	11	206
1	UMA Racing Yamaha Maju Motor	26	3	Ret	2	Ret	Ret	9	Ret	3	**1**	**9**	206
2	T.Pro Yuzy Honda NTS	63	1	5	5	6	3	6	2	13	3	5	205
2	T.Pro Yuzy Honda NTS	20	**7**	**8**	11	10							205
2	T.Pro Yuzy Honda NTS	22					5	Ret	8	10	Ret	Ret	205
2	T.Pro Yuzy Honda NTS	96					10	Ret	10	12	Ret	10	205
2	T.Pro Yuzy Honda NTS	95	11	12	12	12							205
3	RCB KAGE Motobatt Yamaha YYPang	98	2	1	4	5	4	Ret	3	7	6	Ret	182
3	RCB KAGE Motobatt Yamaha YYPang	18	DNS	4	**Ret**	**4**	Ret	Ret	5	5	8	7	182
4	Harian Metro YTEQ SCK Honda Racing	19	6	2	6	Ret	Ret	3	7	6	9	6	173
4	Harian Metro YTEQ SCK Honda Racing	93	4	6	8	7	7	10	6	8	Ret	8	173
5	TPK48 BKMS Indonesia	60	5	Ret	1	2	**9**	**1**	**11**	**2**	5	1	149
6	FELDA PB Racing	33	Ret	Ret	7	11	8	8	4	9	4	3	117
6	FELDA PB Racing	11	9	3	10	Ret							117
6	FELDA PB Racing	38									10	Ret	117
6	FELDA PB Racing	65							13	DNS			117
7	Malioboro City Jogjakarta BKMS	92	Ret	7	3	3	Ret	5	Ret	4	2	2	105
8	IUGB AFB Tech Racing	99			9	8	Ret	Ret	9	11	7	4	92
8	IUGB AFB Tech Racing	56	Ret	10	Ret	9	6	Ret					92
8	IUGB AFB Tech Racing	65	10	11									92
8	IUGB AFB Tech Racing	66									11	Ret	92
8	IUGB AFB Tech Racing	55							12	Ret			92

=== Manufacturers Championship ===
==== Supersport 600 ====
Pos.	Manufacturer	JOH (Malaysia)		BUR (Thailand)		SUZ (Japan)		SEN (Indonesia)		MAD (India)		BUR (Thailand)		Pts.
Pos.	Manufacturer	R1	R2	R1	R2	R1	R2	R1	R2	R1	R2	R1	R2	Pts.
1	(Japan) Honda	2	2	1	1	2	1	1	1	4	5	6	5	230
2	(Japan) Yamaha	7	8	5	5	1	3	5	7	1	1	1	1	200
3	(Japan) Kawasaki	1	1	4	2	5	4	Ret	5	3	3	4	4	176
4	(Japan) Suzuki	14	13	12	12	12	8	10	8	10	11	12	13	57

==== Asia Production 250 ====
Pos.	Manufacturer	JOH (Malaysia)		BUR (Thailand)		SUZ (Japan)		SEN (Indonesia)		MAD (India)		BUR (Thailand)		Pts.
Pos.	Manufacturer	R1	R2	R1	R2	R1	R2	R1	R2	R1	R2	R1	R2	Pts.
1	(Japan) Yamaha	1	1	1	2	1	1	4	1	1	1	1	1	283
2	(Japan) Kawasaki	5	7	5	1	2	2	1	2	3	9	11	2	189
3	(Japan) Honda	6	5	3	10	8	6	2	6	4	2	4	8	145

==== Underbone 130 ====
Pos.	Manufacturer	JOH (Malaysia)		BUR (Thailand)		SEN (Indonesia)		MAD (India)		BUR (Thailand)		Pts.
Pos.	Manufacturer	R1	R2	R1	R2	R1	R2	R1	R2	R1	R2	Pts.
1	(Japan) Yamaha	2	1	1	1	1	1	1	1	1	1	245
2	(Japan) Honda	1	2	5	6	3	3	2	6	3	5	155

== Extra links ==
- Official website
