= Asia Road Racing Championship =

Asian motorcycle racing championship

FIM Asia Road Racing Championship
- FIM ARRC Official Logo
- Category: Motorcycle sport
- Region: Asia (mainly at Southeast Asia region and some East Asia, West Asia and South Asia)
- Inaugural season: 1996
- Classes: Asia Superbikes 1000cc; Asia Supersport 600cc; Asia Supersport 250cc; Underbone 150cc
- Official website: www.asiaroadracing.com

ASB1000
- Constructors: Honda, BMW, Yamaha, Ducati, Suzuki, Aprilia, Kawasaki
- Tyre suppliers: Dunlop
- Riders' champion: 2025 (Malaysia) Hafizh Syahrin
- Constructors' champion: Ducati
- Teams' champion: JDT Racing Team

SS600
- Constructors: Honda, Yamaha
- Tyre suppliers: Dunlop
- Riders' champion: 2025 (Malaysia) Kasma Daniel
- Constructors' champion: Yamaha
- Teams' champion: Hong Leong Yamaha Racing

AP250
- Constructors: Honda, Kawasaki, Yamaha
- Tyre suppliers: Dunlop
- Riders' champion: 2025 (Indonesia) Fadillah Arbi Aditama
- Constructors' champion: Honda
- Teams' champion: Astra Honda Racing Team

UB150
- Constructors: Honda, Yamaha
- Tyre suppliers: Dunlop
- Riders' champion: 2025 (Indonesia) Husni Fuadzy
- Constructors' champion: Yamaha
- Teams' champion: Ziear LFN HP969 MCR RBT 34

The FIM Asia Road Racing Championship (known as Idemitsu FIM Asia Road Racing Championship for sponsorship reason) is the regional motorcycle road racing championship for Asia, held since 1996.

This championship has production-based classes, similar to the Supersport World Championship, British Supersport Championship, AMA Supersport Championship and Australian Supersport Championship. Modified versions of road-going motorcycles available to the public are featured in the race.

The championship is currently divided into four open-make classes – the ASB1000 (Asia Superbikes), ASS600 (Asia Supersports), ASS250 (Asia Supersports 250) and UB150 (Underbone 150). The new Asian Superbikes class revived off in 2019.

== Overview ==
The Asia Road Racing Championship was first organized in 1996 as part of an Asian-wide initiative boost the development of the sport of motorcycle racing in the continent. The championship received the endorsement of the Fédération Internationale de Motocyclisme (FIM, "International Motorcycling Federation") in 1997 and has been recognized since as the Asian continental championship for the FIM.

The commercial rights are owned by Two Wheels Motor Racing, with FIM Asia as the sports sanctioning body.

The 2020 season consists of seven rounds with two races organized per round.

== Circuits ==
The championship tours in Asia but is open to riders from all nationalities.

The Asia Road Racing 2024 season will consist of 6 races at 5 circuits in 5 Asian countries.

- Round 1, 15–17 March 2024, Thailand, Chang International Circuit
- Round 2, 19–21 April 2024, China, Zhuhai International Circuit
- Round 3, 7–9 June 2024, Japan, Mobility Resort Motegi
- Round 4, 26–28 July 2024, Indonesia, Mandalika International Street Circuit
- Round 5, 13–15 September 2024, Malaysia, Sepang International Circuit
- Round 6, 6–8 December 2024, Thailand, Chang International Circuit

Other venues that had previously hosted the Asia Road Racing Championship included:

- Shah Alam, Malaysia, Shah Alam Circuit (1996, 2001–2002)
- Bogor, Indonesia, Sentul International Circuit (1996–2000, 2002–2018)
- Batangas, Philippines, Batangas Racing Circuit (1996)
- Nakhonchaisee, Thailand, Thailand Circuit (1996–2001)
- Pasir Gudang, Malaysia, Johor Circuit (1996–2004, 2006, 2008, 2016–2017)
- Chennai (Madras), India, Madras International Circuit (1997, 2009–2011, 2013, 2017–2018)
- Subic Bay, Philippines, Subic International Raceway (1997)
- Fukuoka, Japan, Autopolis (2009–2014)
- Doha, Qatar, Losail International Circuit (2010–2015)
- Donggang, Taiwan, Penbay International Circuit (2012)
- Suzuka, Japan, Suzuka International Racing Course (2013–2019)
- Dankaur, India, Buddh International Circuit (2016)
- Tailem Bend, Australia, The Bend Motorsport Park (2018–2019)
- Murata, Japan, Sportsland Sugo (2022–2023)

== Current broadcasters ==
=== Worldwide ===
Live coverage, on-demand, and highlights for free practices, qualifications, and races is available on Asia Road Racing Championship's official Facebook page and Youtube channel, as well as Bikeandrace.com.

=== Asia-Pacific ===
Country/Region	Broadcaster
China	Selected regional channels, online platforms, and social medias
China	Star Sports
South Korea	Star Sports
Hong Kong	SPOTV
Macau	SPOTV
Mongolia	SPOTV
Papua New Guinea	SPOTV
Southeast Asia: Brunei; Cambodia; Indonesia; Laos; Malaysia; Myanmar; Philippines; Singapore; Thailand; Timor-Leste; Vietnam	SPOTV
Thailand	True4U

== Winners by race class ==
=== 1996–1999 ===
The road racing series began on 2-stroke engines.

Year	Series Production 250cc (2-stroke)	Sports Production 150cc (2-stroke)	Underbone 125cc (2-stroke)	Underbone 110cc (2-stroke)
1996	(Malaysia) Shahrol Yuzy Ahmad Zaini	(Thailand) Direk Achawong		(Thailand) Somkuan Raemee
1997	(Malaysia) Chow Yan Kit	(Thailand) Direk Achawong	(Thailand) Niphon Saengsawang	(Thailand) Eakrach Punbuppha
1998	(Japan) Youichi Nakajima	(Thailand) Direk Achawong	(Thailand) Eakrach Punbuppha	(Thailand) Amporn Siriphat
1999	(Japan) Naoto Ogura	(Thailand) Direk Achawong	(Thailand) Eakrach Punbuppha	(Thailand) Surapong Boonlert

=== 2000–2003 ===
The gradual shift to 4-stroke engines began in 2000 when the SuperSports 600cc class replaced the previous 250cc bikes as the premier class of the championship.

Year	SuperSports 600cc (4-stroke)	GP125 (2-stroke)	Underbone 125cc (2-stroke)	Underbone 110cc (2-stroke)
2000	(Malaysia) Chia Tuck Cheong	(Thailand) Suhathai Chaemsap	(Thailand) Surapong Boonlert	(Thailand) Thammanoon Sillapakul
2001	(Malaysia) Chia Tuck Cheong	(Thailand) Direk Achawong	(Malaysia) Mazlan Khamis	
2002	(Japan) Toshiyuki Hamaguchi	(Thailand) Suhathai Chaemsap	(Malaysia) Mohamad Hisham Ngadin	
2003	(Japan) Toshiyuki Hamaguchi		(Malaysia) Mohamad Hisham Ngadin	

=== 2004–2005 ===
Year	SuperSports 600cc (4-stroke)	Underbone 125cc (2-stroke)	Underbone 115cc (4-stroke)
2004	(Japan) Toshiyuki Hamaguchi	(Malaysia) Ahmad Fazli Sham	(Indonesia) Fadli Immammuddin
2005	(Japan) Toshiyuki Hamaguchi	(Malaysia) Ahmad Fazli Sham	(Indonesia) Doni Tata Pradita

=== 2006–2014 ===
Year	SuperSports 600cc (4-stroke)	Underbone 115cc (4-stroke)	Underbone 115cc (Under 21)	Asia Dream Cup
2006	(Japan) Toshiyuki Hamaguchi	(Indonesia) Gilang Pranata Sukma	(Indonesia) Feizy Juniardith	
2007	(Thailand) Decha Kraisart	(Indonesia) Wahyu Widodo		
2008	(Japan) Toshiyuki Hamaguchi	(Indonesia) Owie Nurhuda		
2009	(Thailand) Chalermpol Polamai	(Malaysia) Mohd Affendi Rosli		
2010	(Thailand) Decha Kraisart	(Indonesia) Hadi Wijaya		
2011	(Japan) Katsuaki Fujiwara	(Indonesia) Rafid Topan Sucipto		
2012	(Japan) Ryuichi Kiyonari	(Indonesia) Hadi Wijaya		(Japan) Hikari Okubo
2013	(Malaysia) Azlan Shah Kamaruzaman	(Indonesia) Hadi Wijaya		(Japan) Hiroki Ono
2014	(Malaysia) Zaqhwan Zaidi	(Indonesia) Gupita Kresna Wardhana		(Malaysia) Khairul Idham Pawi

=== 2015–2018 ===
Year	SuperSports 600cc (4-stroke)	Asia Production 250cc (4-stroke)	Underbone 130cc (4-stroke)	Asia Dream Cup	Suzuki Asian Challenge
2015	(Japan) Yuki Takahashi	(Japan) Takehiro Yamamoto	(Indonesia) Gupita Kresna Wardhana	(Thailand) Muklada Sarapuech	(Indonesia) Andreas Gunawan
2016	(Malaysia) Zaqhwan Zaidi	(Thailand) Apiwat Wongthananon	(Indonesia) Wahyu Aji Trilaksana	(Japan) Hiroki Nakamura	(Indonesia) Jefri Tosema
2017	(Malaysia) Azlan Shah Kamaruzaman	(Indonesia) Gerry Salim	(Malaysia) Md Akid Aziz	(Philippines) Jomimar Medina	
2018	(Thailand) Ratthapong Wilairot	(Indonesia) Rheza Danica Ahrens	(Malaysia) Md Helmi Azman		

=== 2019–2021 ===
Year	ASB1000 (4-stroke)	SuperSports 600cc (4-stroke)	Asia Production 250cc (4-stroke)	Underbone 150cc (4-stroke)
2019	(Malaysia) Azlan Shah Kamaruzaman	(Thailand) Peerapong Boonlert	(Indonesia) Andy Muhammad Fadly	(Philippines) McKinley Kyle Paz
2020	Season cancelled due to the COVID-19 pandemic			
2021	Season cancelled due to the COVID-19 pandemic			

=== 2022– ===
Year	ASB1000 (4-stroke)	SuperSports 600cc (4-stroke)	Asia Production 250cc (4-stroke)	Underbone 150cc (4-stroke)	TVS Asia One-Make (4-stroke)
2022	(Malaysia) Zaqhwan Zaidi	(Indonesia) Andi Farid Izdihar	(Indonesia) Andy Muhammad Fadly	(Indonesia) Wahyu Aji Trilaksana	(Thailand) Vorapong Malahuan
2023	(Germany) Markus Reiterberger	(Japan) Soichiro Minamimoto	(Indonesia) Rheza Danica Ahrens	(Malaysia) Nazirul Izzat Bahauddin	(Malaysia) Muzakkir Mohamed
2024	(Japan) Yuki Kunii	(Thailand) Apiwat Wongthananon	(Indonesia) Herjun Atna Firdaus	(Indonesia) Fahmi Basam	(Japan) Hiroki Ono
2025	(Malaysia) Hafizh Syahrin	(Malaysia) Kasma Daniel	(Indonesia) Fadillah Arbi Aditama	(Indonesia) Husni Fuadzy	(Japan) Hiroki Ono

== Notable achievements ==
The Asia Road Racing Championship is a mix of well-known riders racing against upcoming talents from the Asian region. Some of the big names that have contributed to the growth of the sport of road racing in Asia include Katsuaki Fujiwara, Ryuichi Kiyonari, Yuki Takahashi and Noriyuki Haga. In 2016, Anthony West was the latest addition in the roster of internationally recognized names. For the 2019 season, Australian racers who have participated in both MotoGP and World Superbike take part in the series, they are Broc Parkes, and Bryan Staring.

This formula of pitting upcoming talents against seasoned campaigners have resulted in a number of successes. In recent years, riders from the Asian region are beginning to make their breakthrough into the MotoGP arena. These include:

- Shahrol Yuzy Ahmad Zaini (250cc, 1996 to 2002)
- Azlan Shah Kamaruzaman (Moto2, 2013 to 2015)
- Hafizh Syahrin Abdullah (Moto2, 2011 to 2017; MotoGP, 2018 to present)
- Thitipong Warokorn (Moto2, 2013 to 2015)
- Rafid Topan Sucipto (Moto2, 2012–13, 2018)
- Doni Tata Pradita (GP250cc, 2008; and Moto2, 2013)
- Dimas Ekky Pratama (Moto2, 2019)
- Khairul Idham Pawi (Moto3, 2016; Moto2, 2017 to present)
- Hiroki Ono (Moto3, 2013 to 2016)

On 4 to 11 July 2016, five young riders from the Asia Production 250cc class became the first batch of riders to be trained at the VR46 Academy in Italy as part of the Yamaha|VR46 Master Camp. They were Peerapong Loiboonpeng (21, Thailand), Imanuel Putra Pratna (19, Indonesia), Galang Hendra Pratama (17, Indonesia), Soichiro Minamimoto (16, Japan) and Kasma Daniel Kasmayudin (16, Malaysia).

== See also ==
- Asia-Pacific Rally Championship
