= Azlan Shah Kamaruzaman =

Malaysian motorcycle racer (born 1984)

- Nationality: Malaysian
- Born: 1 October 1984 (age 42); Klang, Selangor, Malaysia
- Current team: ONEXOX TKKR SAG Racing Team
- Bike number: 25
Motorcycle racing career statistics
Moto2 World Championship
Active years	2013–2015
Manufacturers	Moriwaki, Kalex
Championships	0
2015 championship position	23rd (24 pts)
Starts / Wins / Podiums / Poles / F. laps / Points; 40 / 0 / 0 / 0 / 0 / 24
Supersport World Championship
Active years	2018
Manufacturers	Kawasaki
2018 championship position	NC (0 pts)
Starts / Wins / Podiums / Poles / F. laps / Points; 1 / 0 / 0 / 0 / 0 / 0

Azlan Shah bin Kamaruzaman (born 1 October 1984) is a Malaysian professional Grand Prix motorcycle racer. He currently competes in the Asia Road Racing Championship (ARRC) ASB1000 Championship aboard a BMW S1000RR. He was the 2012 Malasian Cub Prix champion in the CP130 class.

== Career ==
=== Moto2 World Championship (2013–2015) ===
Azlan made his debut in the Moto2 class as the substitute rider for Yuki Takahashi at the 2013 San Marino Grand Prix and finish the race in 23rd place, becoming the fourth participant from the ARRC to race in Moto2 after Thitipong Warokorn, Doni Tata Pradita and Rafid Topan Sucipto. He was the winner of the 2013 SuperSports 600cc Asia Road Racing Championship.

In 2014, Azlan continued racing for the Idemitsu Honda Team Asia in the Moto2 World Championship, together with his new teammate, Takaaki Nakagami. He remained with the team into 2015, when he recorded his best finish of fourth, at Motegi.

Prior to the 2016 Moto2 season, Azlan initially withdrew from the championship due to financial problems but later returned when JPMoto Malaysia was taken over by FGV Malaysia Racing. However, Azlan withdrew a second time due to further financial problems.

=== Return to ARRC (2016–present) ===
In 2016, Azlan returned to compete in ARRC in Supersport 600 class with BikeART Racing Kawasaki, where he finished third in the standings with double victory at Johor Circuit. He switched to Manual Tech KYT Team for 2017, partnering Ahmad Yudhistira. He won the championship for the second time with two wins in Round 2 at Chang International Circuit and acquired 155 points. For the following year he remained at the team, where he won a race at Suzuka and finished third in the final standings.

With the introduction of ASB1000 Class in the ARRC, Azlan was recruited by ONEXOX TKKR SAG Team for the inaugural season of the class, aboard a BMW S1000RR. He was the winner of the first ASB1000 race ever at Sepang International Circuit (Round 1), and further scored double victories in Round 3 at Chang International Circuit and Round 6 at Sepang International Circuit. He is currently second in overall behind Australian former MotoGP rider Broc Parkes.

=== Supersport World Championship (2018) ===
Azlan briefly raced in 2018 Supersport World Championship at Chang International Circuit round as a replacement for Kenan Sofuoğlu at Kawasaki Puccetti Racing, where he finished the race 16th.

== Career statistics ==
=== FIM CEV Moto2 European Championship ===
==== Races by year ====
(key) (Races in bold indicate pole position, races in italics indicate fastest lap)

Year	Bike	1	2	3	4	5	6	7	8	9	10	11	Pos	Pts
2019	Kalex	EST1	EST2	VAL	CAT1; 10	CAT2; 12	ARA1	ARA2	JER	ALB1	ALB2	VAL; 10	21st	16

=== Grand Prix motorcycle racing ===
==== Races by year ====
(key) (Races in bold indicate pole position, races in italics indicate fastest lap)

Year	Class	Bike	1	2	3	4	5	6	7	8	9	10	11	12	13	14	15	16	17	18	Pos	Pts
2013	Moto2	Moriwaki	QAT	AME	SPA	FRA	ITA	CAT	NED	GER	INP	CZE	GBR	RSM; 23	ARA; Ret	MAL; 21	AUS; 19	JPN; 23	VAL; 25		NC	0
2014	Moto2	Kalex	QAT; 18	AME; 18	ARG; 21	SPA; 24	FRA; 24	ITA; 27	CAT; 19	NED; Ret	GER; 28	INP; 20	CZE; 28	GBR; 25	RSM; 32	ARA; 19	JPN; 24	AUS; DNS	MAL; 20	VAL; 27	NC	0
2015	Moto2	Kalex	QAT; 18	AME; 19	ARG; 17	SPA; 21	FRA; 19	ITA; 15	CAT; 19	NED; 16	GER; Ret	INP; 11	CZE; 23	GBR; 19	RSM; 13	ARA; 14	JPN; 4	AUS; 21	MAL; 16	VAL; DNS	23rd	24

=== Supersport World Championship ===
==== Races by year ====
(key) (Races in bold indicate pole position; races in italics indicate fastest lap)

Year	Bike	1	2	3	4	5	6	7	8	9	10	11	12	Pos	Pts
2018	Kawasaki	AUS	THA; 16	SPA	NED	ITA	GBR	CZE	ITA	POR	FRA	ARG	QAT	NC	0

=== Asia Superbike 1000 ===
==== Races by year ====
(key) (Races in bold indicate pole position; races in italics indicate fastest lap)

Year	Bike	1		2		3		4		5		6		Pos	Pts
Year	Bike	R1	R2	R1	R2	R1	R2	R1	R2	R1	R2	R1	R2	Pos	Pts
2022	BMW	CHA; Ret	CHA; 6	SEP; Ret	SEP; 7	SUG; 9	SUG; 9	SEP; 4	SEP; 6	CHA; 6	CHA; 3			7th	82

=== ARRC Supersports 1000 Championship ===
==== Races by year ====
(key) (Races in bold indicate pole position; races in italics indicate fastest lap)

Year	Bike	1		2		3		4		5		6		Pos	Pts
Year	Bike	R1	R2	R1	R2	R1	R2	R1	R2	R1	R2	R1	R2	Pos	Pts
2023	BMW	CHA; 2	CHA; 3	SEP; 2	SEP; 3	SUG; Ret	SUG; 11	MAN; 5	MAN; C	ZHU; 3	ZHU; 3	CHA; 4	CHA; 4	4th	146
2024	BMW	CHA; 1	CHA; 5	ZHU; 2	ZHU; C	MOT; 5	MOT; 4	MAN; 10	MAN; DNS	SEP; 2	SEP; 4	CHA; Ret	CHA; 5	5th	126
2025	BMW	CHA; 7	CHA; 6	SEP; 7	SEP; 5	MOT; 7	MOT; 6	MAN; 4	MAN; 1	SEP; DNS	SEP; DNS	CHA	CHA	7th	96

=== Suzuka 8 Hours ===
Year	Class	Team	Co-riders	Bike	Pos
2026	**EWC**	(Japan) Team Frontier	(Japan) Ryosuke Katahira (Japan) Sho Hasegawa	BMW S1000RR	TBD
