= Johor Circuit =

Motorsport race track in Johor, Malaysia

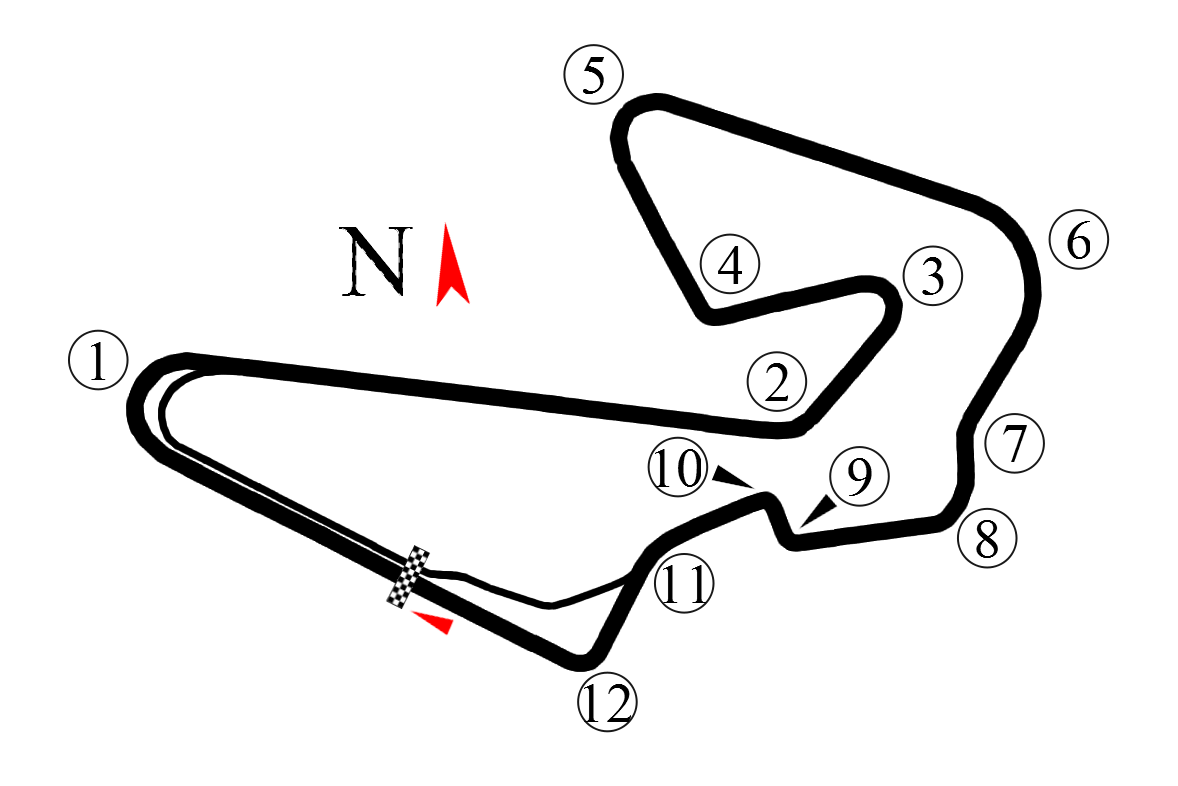
- Grand Prix Circuit (1986–2017)
- Location: Pasir Gudang, Johor, Malaysia
- Coordinates: 1°28′58″N 103°54′34″E
- Broke ground: 1985
- Opened: 1986
- Closed: 2017
- Major events: Asia Road Racing Championship (1996–2004, 2006, 2008, 2016–2017); Porsche Carrera Cup Asia (2003); Asian Touring Car Series (2000–2003); Formula BMW Asia (2003); Asian Formula 2000 (1998–2002); South East Asia Touring Car Zone Challenge (1996–1999); Grand Prix motorcycle racing Malaysian motorcycle Grand Prix (1998); World SBK (1992–1993); FIM EWC (1991–1992)
- Website: https://www.facebook.com/profile.php?id=100069502317196

Grand Prix Circuit (1986–2017)
- Length: 3.860 km (2.398 mi)
- Turns: 12
- Race lap record: 1:09.100 ( (Sweden) Jan Nilsson, Reynard 883, 1989, F3)

The Johor Circuit was a race track located in Pasir Gudang Johor, Malaysia.

== History ==
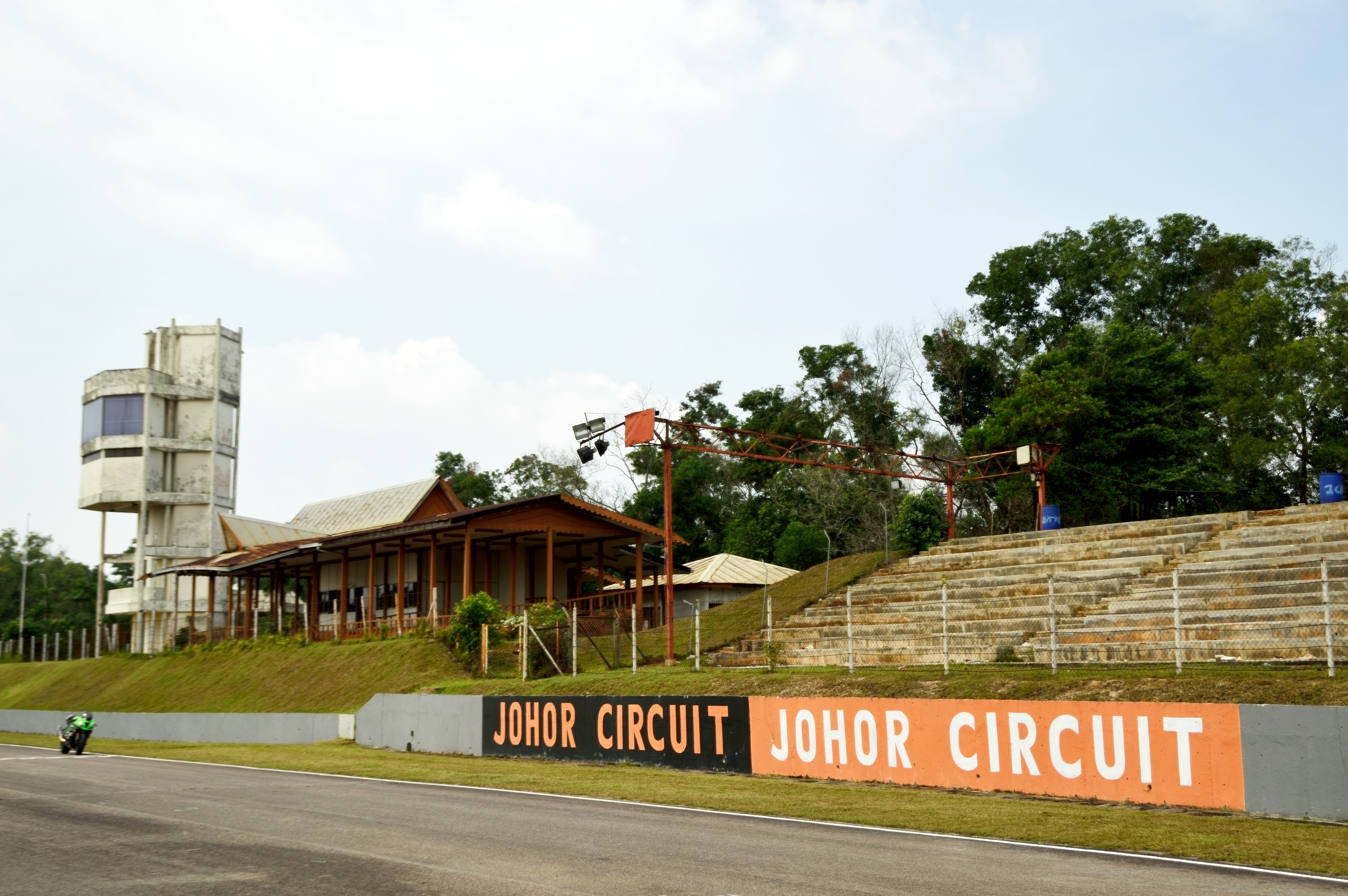
Johor Circuit

The construction of the circuit began in 1985 and was officially opened on 1986 by Sultan Iskandar. In 1998, it underwent another development. In 2015, Sultan Ibrahim Ismail announced that the circuit would be redeveloped. In 2016, the new design plan was presented with a cost of US$800 million. However, the redevelopment plans failed, and the circuit was closed in 2017 after the Asia Road Racing Championship races.

== Events ==
The circuit hosted the Malaysian motorcycle Grand Prix in 1998, as well as two races of the Superbike World Championship in 1992 and 1993.

The Asian Festival of Speed, comprising the Asian Touring Car Championship and the Asian Formula 2000 series, used to host its events at Johor Circuit in the early 2000s. In 2003, Asian Formula 2000 was replaced by Formula BMW Asia and is joined by Porsche Carrera Cup Asia for the event.

== Lap records ==
The fastest official race lap records at the Johor Circuit are listed as:

Category	Time	Driver	Vehicle	Event
Grand Prix Circuit (1986–2017): 3.860 km (2.398 mi)
Formula Three	1:09.100	Jan Nilsson	Reynard 883	1989 Johor Grand Prix
500cc	1:29.636	Mick Doohan	Honda NSR500	1998 Malaysian motorcycle Grand Prix
World SBK	1:30.450	Scott Russell	Kawasaki ZXR-750	1993 Johor World SBK round
250cc	1:30.897	Valentino Rossi	Aprilia RS250	1998 Malaysian motorcycle Grand Prix
Supersport	1:32.021	Decha Kraisart	Yamaha YZF-R6	2017 Johor ARRC round
Asian Formula 2000	1:33.690	Ng Wai Leong	Argo Formula Asia	2000 Johor Asian Formula 2000 round
125cc	1:34.782	Masao Azuma	Honda RS125	1998 Malaysian motorcycle Grand Prix
Super Touring	1:36.490	Charles Kwan	BMW 320	1999 2nd Johor SEATCZC round
Asia Productions 250	1:42.849	Rheza Danica Ahrens	Honda CBR250RR	2017 Johor ARRC round
Super 2000	1:43.580	Charles Kwan	BMW 320i	2000 Johor ATCC round
Asia Underbone 150	1:49.294	Wahyu Aji Trilaksana	Yamaha T-150	2017 Johor ARRC round
Asia Dream Cup	1:51.145	Md Harith Farhan	Honda CBR250R	2016 Johor ARRC round

== See also ==
- Sport in Malaysia
- List of tourist attractions in Johor

== External websites ==
- Official Johor Circuit Facebook page
