= Thailand Circuit =

Nakhonchaisri Motor Sport Complex
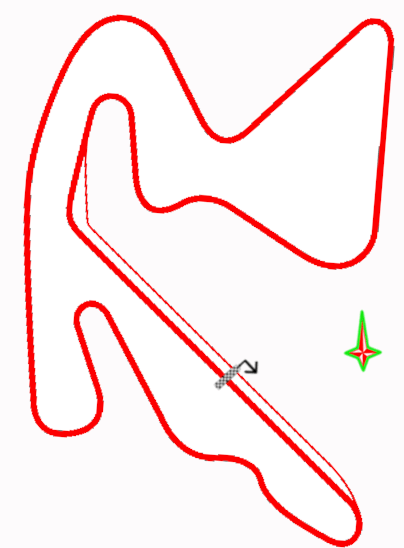
- Full Circuit (1989–present)
- Location: Nakhon Pathom, Thailand
- Coordinates: 13°54′42.64″N 100°10′4.33″E
- Opened: 1989
- Major events: Asia Road Racing Championship (1996–2001)
- Length: 2.500 km (1.553 mi)
- Turns: 15

Nakhonchaisri Motor Sport Complex (Thailand Circuit) was established in 1989 aiming for Motorsports Entertainment in Thailand.

Thongchai Wongsawan, President and Founder of Thailand Circuit's has had a passion and faith in Motorsport since his childhood and he became a Motorsports Connoisseur in 1978 by developing a small partnership to organise Motosports and today his firm has become the leading one in Motorsport, Media & Music Marketing in Thailand as well as International Criteria.

To celebrate the 30th Anniversary of FM:T Thailand Road Racing and Top Gear Group in 2008, Thailand Circuit, Motorsports Complex made another move and renovation of Motorsports Facilities to support Motorcycles, Cars Manufactures and Automotive Industrial Business firms.

Motorsports Complex is the venue for Racing Competition, benefiting Racing Enthusiasts, Automotive Marketing & Advertising, Research & Development of Products, Media Companies, Driving Education and for Thai Racers to enter the World Championship.

Thailand Circuit, Motorsports Complex is taking the second gear to continue in Motorsports Entertainment for every family to enjoy the fast-lane life style in 2008.

== Circuit Racing / Road Racing ==
FIM International Standard of Road Racing Circuit Homologated.

- Length: 2.500 km (1.553 mi)
- Width: 12–15 m (39–49 ft)
- Corner: 15 Turns (9 right, 6 left)

Applicable for: Motorcycles Road Racing (Stock Bikes, Supersports, Superbike), Cars Circuit Racing (Stock Cars, Supercars, Sports cars), Trackday / Club Meeting, Motorsports Education, Safety Driving Education, Driving / Riding Experience, Media Test Drive, Gathering Event, Products Launching & Event.
