= Zaqhwan Zaidi =

Malaysian motorcycle racer

- Nationality: Malaysian
- Born: 20 July 1995 (age 31); Selangor, Malaysia
- Current team: Petronas MIE Racing Honda Team
- Bike number: 51 & 21
Motorcycle racing career statistics
Moto2 World Championship
Active years	2013, 2015
Manufacturers	Suter
2015 championship position	NC (0 pts)
Starts / Wins / Podiums / Poles / F. laps / Points; 6 / 0 / 0 / 0 / 0 / 0
Superbike World Championship
Active years	2025–
Manufacturers	Honda
2025 championship position	26th (1 pt)
Starts / Wins / Podiums / Poles / F. laps / Points; 27 / 0 / 0 / 0 / 0 / 1
Supersport World Championship
Active years	2014
Manufacturers	Honda
2014 championship position	24th (7 pts)
Starts / Wins / Podiums / Poles / F. laps / Points; 1 / 0 / 0 / 0 / 0 / 7

Zaqhwan Zaidi (born 20 July 1995, in Selangor) is a Malaysian motorcycle racer. He has ridden in the MFJ All Japan Road Race JSB1000 Championship, aboard a Honda CBR1000RR and the Asia Road Race SS600 Championship, aboard a Honda CBR600RR. He won the SS600 title in the Asia Road Racing Championship in 2014 and again in 2016.

Zaidi won the Asia Superbike Championship title in his first year of competing in 2022. At the Asia Road Racing Championship in 2025, Zaidi took a double podium spot in the opening round.

== Career statistics ==
=== Grand Prix motorcycle racing ===
==== By season ====
Season	Class	Motorcycle	Team	Race	Win	Podium	Pole	FLap	Pts	Plcd
2013	Moto2	Suter	Technomag carXpert	0	0	0	0	0	0	NC
2015	Moto2	Suter	JPMoto Malaysia	6	0	0	0	0	0	NC
Total				**6**	**0**	**0**	**0**	**0**	**0**	

==== Races by year ====
Year	Class	Bike	1	2	3	4	5	6	7	8	9	10	11	12	13	14	15	16	17	18	Pos.	Points
2013	Moto2	Suter	QAT	AME	SPA	FRA	ITA	CAT	NED	GER	INP	CZE	GBR	RSM	ARA	MAL; DNS	AUS	JPN	VAL		NC	0
2015	Moto2	Suter	QAT; 23	AME; Ret	ARG; 27	SPA; 26	FRA; 25	ITA; Ret	CAT	NED	GER	INP	CZE	GBR	RSM	ARA	JPN	AUS	MAL	VAL	NC	0

=== Supersport World Championship ===
==== Races by year ====
(key)

Year	Bike	1	2	3	4	5	6	7	8	9	10	11	Pos.	Pts
2014	Honda	AUS	SPA	NED	ITA	GBR	MAL; 9	SMR	POR	SPA	FRA	QAT	24th	7

=== Asia Superbike 1000 ===
==== Races by year ====
(key) (Races in bold indicate pole position; races in italics indicate fastest lap)

Year	Bike	1		2		3		4		5		6		Pos	Pts
Year	Bike	R1	R2	R1	R2	R1	R2	R1	R2	R1	R2	R1	R2	Pos	Pts
2022	Honda	**CHA**; 1	**CHA**; 2	SEP; 4	SEP; 2	SUG; 2	SUG; 4	SEP; 8	SEP; 3	CHA; 5	CHA; 5			1st	157
2023	Honda	**CHA**; 3	**CHA**; 2	SEP; 3	SEP; 5	SUG; 11	SUG; 3	MAN; 3	MAN; C	ZHU; 2	ZHU; 2	CHA; 3	CHA; 3	3rd	172
2024	Honda	CHA; 3	CHA; 6	ZHU	ZHU	MOT; 6	MOT; 5	MAN; 8	MAN; 4	SEP; 5	SEP; 6	CHA; 2	CHA; 4	6th	121
2025	Honda	**CHA**; 2	**CHA**; 2	SEP; 3	SEP; 14	MOT; 3	MOT; 5	MAN; 3	MAN; 4	SEP; 2	SEP; 9	CHA; 5	CHA; 3	4th	168
2026	Honda	SEP; 5	SEP; 4	CHA; 4	CHA; 4	MOT; 7	MOT; 13	MAN	MAN	SEP	SEP	CHA	CHA	7th*	49*

=== Superbike World Championship ===
==== Races by year ====
(key) (Races in bold indicate pole position) (Races in italics indicate fastest lap)

Year	Bike	1			2			3			4			5			6			7			8			9			10			11			12			Pos	Pts
Year	Bike	R1	SR	R2	R1	SR	R2	R1	SR	R2	R1	SR	R2	R1	SR	R2	R1	SR	R2	R1	SR	R2	R1	SR	R2	R1	SR	R2	R1	SR	R2	R1	SR	R2	R1	SR	R2	Pos	Pts
2025	Honda	AUS; DNQ	AUS; DNQ	AUS; DNQ	POR; Ret	POR; 21	POR; 16	NED; 17	NED; 19	NED; 22	ITA; 20	ITA; 22	ITA; 20	CZE; Ret	CZE; 22	CZE; Ret	EMI; 17	EMI; 18	EMI; 17	GBR	GBR	GBR	HUN; 18	HUN; 17	HUN; 17	FRA; 15	FRA; 19	FRA; 18	ARA; 20	ARA; 19	ARA; Ret	POR	POR	POR	SPA; 22	SPA; 21	SPA; 21	26th	1

== Suzuka 8 Hours results ==
Year	Team	Riders	Bike	Pos
2023	(Japan) Honda Asia Dream	(Australia) Troy Herfoss (Indonesia) Andi Farid Izdihar	Honda CBR1000RR-R SP	7th
2025	(Japan) Honda Asia-Dream Racing with Astemo	(Thailand) Nakarin Atiratphuvapat (Malaysia) Azroy Hakeem	Honda CBR1000RR-R SP	10th
