= Apiwat Wongthananon =

Thai motorcycle racer

- Nationality: Thai
- Born: 2 February 1994 (age 32); Chonburi, Thailand
- Current team: Yamaha Thailand Racing Team
- Bike number: 24
Motorcycle racing career statistics
Moto2 World Championship
Active years	2011
Manufacturers	FTR
Starts / Wins / Podiums / Poles / F. laps / Points; 1 / 0 / 0 / 0 / 0 / 0
Moto3 World Championship
Active years	2018
Manufacturers	KTM
2018 championship position	38th (0 pts)
Starts / Wins / Podiums / Poles / F. laps / Points; 2 / 0 / 0 / 0 / 0 / 0
Supersport World Championship
Active years	2023–
Manufacturers	Yamaha
Championships	0
2023 championship position	38th (4 pts)
Starts / Wins / Podiums / Poles / F. laps / Points; 8 / 0 / 0 / 0 / 0 / 4

Apiwat Wongthananon (born 2 February 1994) is a Thai motorcycle racer. He last competed in the Supersport World Championship with Yamaha Thailand Racing Team. He was champion in the AP250 class of the Asia Road Racing Championship in 2016.

== Career statistics ==
=== FIM CEV Moto3 Junior World Championship ===
==== Races by year ====
(key) (Races in bold indicate pole position, races in italics indicate fastest lap)

Year	Bike	1	2	3	4	5	6	7	8	9	10	11	12	Pos	Pts
2017	KTM	ALB; 8	LMS; 9	CAT1; 16	CAT2; 7	VAL1	VAL2	EST	JER1; 16	JER1; 6	ARA; 5	VAL1; Ret	VAL2; 19	12th	45
2018	KTM	EST; Ret	VAL1	VAL2	FRA; 12	CAT1; 3	CAT2; 8	ARA; Ret	JER1; Ret	JER2; Ret	ALB; 4	VAL1; 12	VAL2; 11	12th	50

=== Grand Prix motorcycle racing ===
==== By season ====
Season	Class	Motorcycle	Team	Race	Win	Podium	Pole	FLap	Pts	Plcd
2011	Moto2	FTR	Thai Honda Singha SAG	1	0	0	0	0	0	NC
2018	Moto3	KTM	VR46 Master Camp Team	2	0	0	0	0	0	38th
Total				**3**	**0**	**0**	**0**	**0**	**0**	

==== Races by year ====
Year	Class	Bike	1	2	3	4	5	6	7	8	9	10	11	12	13	14	15	16	17	18	19	Pos.	Points
2011	Moto2	FTR	QAT	SPA	POR	FRA	CAT	GBR	NED	ITA	GER	CZE	IND	RSM	ARA	JPN	AUS	MAL; Ret	VAL			NC	0
2018	Moto3	KTM	QAT	ARG	AME	SPA	FRA	ITA	CAT	NED	GER	CZE	AUT	GBR	RSM	ARA	THA; 16	JPN	AUS	MAL; 22	VAL	38th	0

=== Supersport World Championship ===
==== Races by year ====
(key) (Races in bold indicate pole position, races in italics indicate fastest lap)

Year	Bike	1	2	3	4	5	6	7	8	9	10	11	12	13	14	15	16	17	18	19	20	21	22	23	24	Pos	Pts
2023	Yamaha	AUS; 15	AUS; 13	INA; DNS	INA; Ret	NED; Ret	NED; 16	SPA; Ret	SPA; Ret	EMI	EMI	GBR	GBR	ITA; WD	ITA; WD	CZE	CZE	FRA	FRA	SPA	SPA	POR	POR	ARG; 17	ARG; DNS	38th	4

* Season still in progress.

=== Asia Superbike 1000 ===
==== Races by year ====
(key) (Races in bold indicate pole position; races in italics indicate fastest lap)

Year	Bike	1		2		3		4		5		6		Pos	Pts
Year	Bike	R1	R2	R1	R2	R1	R2	R1	R2	R1	R2	R1	R2	Pos	Pts
2022	Yamaha	CHA; 4	CHA; 1	SEP; 3	SEP; 5	SUG; DNS	SUG; 5	SEP; 2	SEP; Ret	CHA; 3	CHA; Ret			4th	112
2025	BMW	CHA; 4	CHA; Ret	**SEP**; Ret	**SEP**; 6	MOT; 12	MOT; Ret	MAN; Ret	MAN; 6	SEP; DNS	SEP; DNS	CHA	CHA	11th*	37*

=== Asia Supersport 600 ===
==== Races by year ====
(key) (Races in bold indicate pole position, races in italics indicate fastest lap)

Year	Bike	1		2		3		4		5		6		Pos	Pts
Year	Bike	R1	R2	R1	R2	R1	R2	R1	R2	R1	R2	R1	R2	Pos	Pts
2024	Yamaha	CHA; 1	CHA; 1	ZHU; 2	ZHU; C	MOT; 1	MOT; 2	MAN; 7	MAN; Ret	**SEP**; 2	**SEP**; 5	CHA; 1	CHA; 1	1st	205
2025	Yamaha	CHA	CHA	SEP	SEP	MOT	MOT	MAN	MAN	SEP	SEP	**CHA**; 1	**CHA**; 5	16th	36
2026	Honda	SEP	SEP	CHA	CHA	MOT; 6	MOT; 5	MAN	MAN	SEP	SEP	CHA	CHA	15th*	21*

== FIM Intercontinental Games results ==
Year	Venue	Class	Team	Bike	No	Rider	Race		Points	TC
Year	Venue	Class	Team	Bike	No	Rider	R1	R2	Points	TC
2024	City of Jerez	SS	FIM Asia	Yamaha YZF-R7	17	(Thailand) Apiwath Wongthananon	8	4	129	2nd
2024	City of Jerez	SS	FIM Asia	Yamaha YZF-R7	18	(Japan) Soichiro Minamimoto	9	8	129	2nd
2024	City of Jerez	SS	FIM Asia	Yamaha YZF-R7	19	(Malaysia) Kasma Daniel	6	6	129	2nd
2024	City of Jerez	SS	FIM Asia	Yamaha YZF-R7	20	(Japan) Naoko Takasugi	15	15	129	2nd
