= Tatsuya Yamaguchi (motorcyclist) =

Japanese motorcycle racer (born 1976)

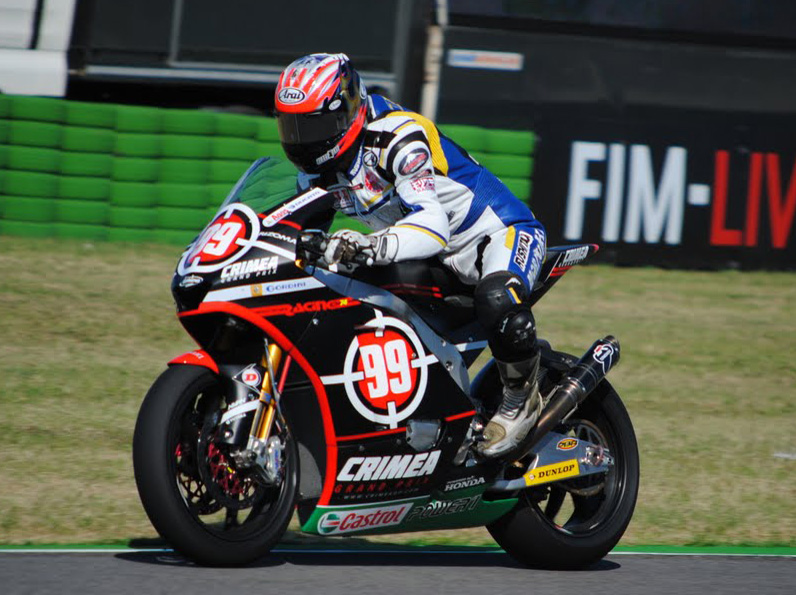
- Yamaguchi at the 2010 San Marino Grand Prix
- Nationality: Japanese
- Born: 11 February 1976 (age 50); Shiki, Japan
- Current team: Team SuP Dream Honda
- Bike number: 8
Motorcycle racing career statistics
Moto2 World Championship
Active years	2010
Manufacturers	Moriwaki
Starts / Wins / Podiums / Poles / F. laps / Points; 1 / 0 / 0 / 0 / 0 / 0
250cc World Championship
Active years	1999
Manufacturers	Honda
Starts / Wins / Podiums / Poles / F. laps / Points; 1 / 0 / 0 / 0 / 0 / 10
Supersport World Championship
Active years	2002
Manufacturers	Honda
Starts / Wins / Podiums / Poles / F. laps / Points; 1 / 0 / 0 / 0 / 0 / 0

Tatsuya Yamaguchi (山口 辰也, Yamaguchi Tatsuya; born 11 February 1976) is a Japanese motorcycle racer. He currently races in the MFJ All Japan Road Race Championship JSB1000 class aboard a Honda CBR1000RR. He has also competed in the MFJ All Japan Road Race GP250 Championship, the MFJ All Japan Road Race JSB1000 Championship (where he was champion in 2002), the MFJ All Japan Road Race J-GP2 Championship, Asia Road Race SS600 Championship and the MFJ All Japan Road Race ST600 Championship, where he was champion in 2010 and 2011.

== Career statistics ==
=== Grand Prix motorcycle racing ===
==== By season ====
Season	Class	Motorcycle	Team	Number	Race	Win	Podium	Pole	FLap	Pts	Plcd
1999	250cc	Honda	Castrol Team Harc Pro	52	1	0	0	0	0	10	22nd
2010	Moto2	Moriwaki	Gresini Racing Moto2	99	1	0	0	0	0	0	NC
Total					**2**	**0**	**0**	**0**	**0**	**10**	

==== Races by year ====
Year	Class	Bike	1	2	3	4	5	6	7	8	9	10	11	12	13	14	15	16	17	Pos.	Points
1999	250cc	Honda	MAL	JPN; 6	SPA	FRA	ITA	CAT	NED	GBR	GER	CZE	IMO	VAL	AUS	RSA	BRA	ARG		22nd	10
2010	Moto2	Moriwaki	QAT	SPA	FRA	ITA	GBR	NED	CAT	GER	CZE	INP	RSM; 25	ARA	JPN	MAL	AUS	POR	VAL	NC	0

=== Supersport World Championship ===
==== Races by year ====
(key)

Year	Bike	1	2	3	4	5	6	7	8	9	10	11	12	Pos.	Pts
2002	Honda	SPA	AUS	RSA	JPN; Ret	ITA	GBR	GER	SMR	GBR	GER	NED	ITA	NC	0

=== All Japan Road Race Championship ===
==== Races by year ====
(key) (Races in bold indicate pole position; races in italics indicate fastest lap)

Year	Class	Bike	1	2	3	4	5	6	Pos	Pts
2024	ST600	Yamaha	MOT	SUG1	SUG2	AUT; 14	OKA; 9	SUZ	18th	8
2025	ST600	Yamaha	SUG1	SUG2	MOT	AUT; 11	OKA	SUZ	19th	5
