= Thitipong Warokorn =

Thai motorcycle racer (born 1989)

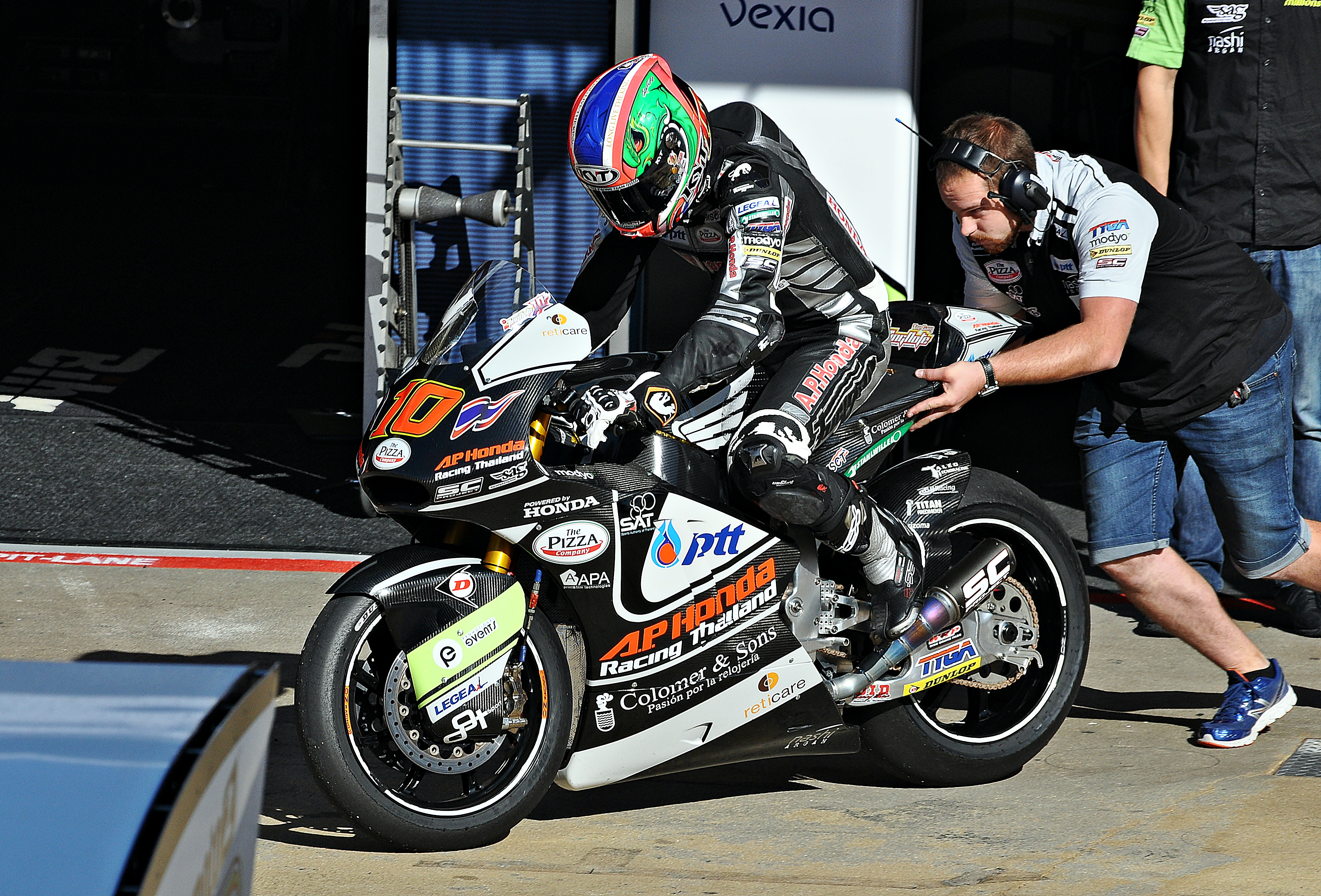
- Warokorn at the 2015 Catalan Grand Prix
- Nationality: Thai
- Born: 27 January 1989 (age 37); Chonburi, Thailand
- Current team: Core Kawasaki Thailand Racing Team
- Bike number: 100
Motorcycle racing career statistics
Moto2 World Championship
Active years	2013–2015, 2018
Manufacturers	Suter, Kalex
2018 championship position	35th (0 pts)
Starts / Wins / Podiums / Poles / F. laps / Points; 43 / 0 / 0 / 0 / 0 / 0
Superbike World Championship
Active years	2019
Manufacturers	Aprilia, BMW, MV Agusta, Kawasaki
Championships	0
2019 championship position	NC (0 pts)
Starts / Wins / Podiums / Poles / F. laps / Points; 2 / 0 / 0 / 0 / 0 / 0
Supersport World Championship
Active years	2015, 2017–2018
Manufacturers	Honda, Kawasaki
2018 championship position	20th (11 pts)
Starts / Wins / Podiums / Poles / F. laps / Points; 3 / 0 / 0 / 0 / 0 / 24

Thitipong Warokorn (born 27 January 1989 in Chonburi) is a Thai motorcycle racer. He races in the Asia Road Race SS600 Championship aboard a Kawasaki ZX-6R.

== Career statistics ==
=== Grand Prix motorcycle racing ===
==== By season ====
Season	Class	Motorcycle	Team	Race	Win	Podium	Pole	FLap	Pts	Plcd
2013	Moto2	Suter	Thai Honda PTT Gresini Moto2	6	0	0	0	0	0	NC
2014	Moto2	Kalex	APH PTT The Pizza SAG	18	0	0	0	0	0	NC
2015	Moto2	Kalex	APH PTT The Pizza SAG	18	0	0	0	0	0	NC
2018	Moto2	Kalex	SAG Team	1	0	0	0	0	0	35th
Total				**43**	**0**	**0**	**0**	**0**	**0**	

==== Races by year ====
Year	Class	Bike	1	2	3	4	5	6	7	8	9	10	11	12	13	14	15	16	17	18	19	Pos	Pts
2013	Moto2	Suter	QAT	AME	SPA	FRA	ITA	CAT	NED	GER	INP; 29	CZE; 24	GBR; 26	RSM; 26	ARA; 24	MAL; 23	AUS; DNS	JPN	VAL			NC	0
2014	Moto2	Kalex	QAT; 20	AME; 22	ARG; 24	SPA; 28	FRA; Ret	ITA; 31	CAT; 24	NED; 29	GER; 26	INP; 27	CZE; 29	GBR; 28	RSM; 30	ARA; 30	JPN; 25	AUS; Ret	MAL; 21	VAL; 28		NC	0
2015	Moto2	Kalex	QAT; 19	AME; 23	ARG; 24	SPA; 22	FRA; 22	ITA; 21	CAT; 25	NED; 23	GER; 22	INP; 18	CZE; 25	GBR; Ret	RSM; 20	ARA; 22	JPN; Ret	AUS; 25	MAL; 27	VAL; 23		NC	0
2018	Moto2	Kalex	QAT	ARG	AME	SPA	FRA	ITA	CAT	NED	GER	CZE	AUT	GBR	RSM	ARA	THA; 18	JPN	AUS	MAL	VAL	35th	0

=== Supersport World Championship ===
==== Races by year ====
Year	Bike	1	2	3	4	5	6	7	8	9	10	11	12	Pos.	Pts
2015	Honda	AUS	THA; 16	SPA	NED	ITA	GBR	POR	ITA	MAL	SPA	FRA	QAT	NC	0
2017	Kawasaki	AUS	THA; 4	SPA	NED	ITA	GBR	ITA	GER	POR	FRA	SPA	QAT	26th	13
2018	Kawasaki	AUS	THA; 5	SPA	NED	ITA	GBR	CZE	ITA	POR	FRA	ARG	QAT	20th	11

=== Superbike World Championship ===
==== Races by year ====
Year	Bike	1			2			3			4			5			6			7			8			9			10			11			12			13			Pos	Pts
Year	Bike	R1	SR	R2	R1	SR	R2	R1	SR	R2	R1	SR	R2	R1	SR	R2	R1	SR	R2	R1	SR	R2	R1	SR	R2	R1	SR	R2	R1	SR	R2	R1	SR	R2	R1	SR	R2	R1	SR	R2	Pos	Pts
2019	Kawasaki	AUS	AUS	AUS	THA; 16	THA; NC	THA; DNS	SPA	SPA	SPA	NED	NED	NED	ITA	ITA	ITA	SPA	SPA	SPA	ITA	ITA	ITA	GBR	GBR	GBR	USA	USA	USA	POR	POR	POR	FRA	FRA	FRA	ARG	ARG	ARG	QAT	QAT	QAT	NC	0

=== Junior Academy ===
Current Team Riders:

- Teetawat 'Gai' Khunpoo (400SS1), Racing under the number 95
- Axel Pedersen (400SP-J), Racing under the number 66
- Whichairot 'Frame' Kongprom (400SP), Racing under the number 142

=== Asia Superbike 1000 ===
==== Races by year ====
(key) (Races in bold indicate pole position; races in italics indicate fastest lap)

Year	Bike	1		2		3		4		5		Pos	Pts
Year	Bike	R1	R2	R1	R2	R1	R2	R1	R2	R1	R2	Pos	Pts
2022	Ducati	CHA; 9	CHA; 8	SEP; DNS	SEP; DNS	SUG	SUG	SEP	SEP	CHA	CHA	14th	15
