= Decha Kraisart =

Thai motorcycle racer (born 1981)

- Nationality: Thai
- Born: 24 January 1981 (age 45); Saraburi, Thailand
- Current team: YAMAHA Thailand Racing TEAM
- Bike number: 24
Motorcycle racing career statistics
Moto2 World Championship
Active years	2013-2014
Manufacturers	Tech 3
2014 championship position	NC (0 pts)
Starts / Wins / Podiums / Poles / F. laps / Points; 2 / 0 / 0 / 0 / 0 / 0
125cc World Championship
Active years	2000
Manufacturers	Yamaha
2000 championship position	NC (0 pts)
Starts / Wins / Podiums / Poles / F. laps / Points; 1 / 0 / 0 / 0 / 0 / 0
Supersport World Championship
Active years	2015-2018
Manufacturers	Yamaha
2016 championship position	31st (5 pts)
Starts / Wins / Podiums / Poles / F. laps / Points; 4 / 0 / 1 / 0 / 0 / 32

Decha Kraisart (born 24 January 1981) is a Thai professional motorcycle racer. He currently races in the Asia Road Race SS600 Championship, aboard a Yamaha YZF-R6. He won the 2012 All Japan Superstock 600 Road Race Championship.

== Career statistics ==
=== Grand Prix motorcycle racing ===
==== By season ====
Season	Class	Motorcycle	Team	Number	Race	Win	Podium	Pole	FLap	Pts	Plcd
2000	125cc	Yamaha	Siam Yamaha Thailand	48	1	0	0	0	0	0	NC
2013	Moto2	Tech 3	Singha Eneos Yamaha Tech 3	46	1	0	0	0	0	0	NC
2014	Moto2	Tech 3	Singha Eneos Yamaha Tech 3	46	1	0	0	0	0	0	NC
Total					3	0	0	0	0	0	

==== Races by year ====
Year	Class	Bike	1	2	3	4	5	6	7	8	9	10	11	12	13	14	15	16	17	18	Pos.	Pts
2000	125cc	Yamaha	RSA	MAL; 20	JPN	SPA	FRA	ITA	CAT	NED	GBR	GER	CZE	POR	VAL	BRA	PAC	AUS			NC	0
2013	Moto2	Tech 3	QAT	AME	SPA	FRA	ITA	CAT	NED	GER	INP	CZE	GBR	RSM	ARA	MAL; DNS	AUS	JPN; 21	VAL		NC	0
2014	Moto2	Tech 3	QAT	AME	ARG	SPA	FRA	ITA	CAT	NED	GER	INP	CZE	GBR	RSM	ARA	JPN	AUS	MAL; 25	VAL	NC	0

=== Supersport World Championship ===
==== Races by year ====
Year	Bike	1	2	3	4	5	6	7	8	9	10	11	12	13	Pos.	Pts
2015	Yamaha	AUS	THA; 11	SPA	NED	ITA	GBR	POR	ITA	MAL	SPA	FRA	QAT		28th	5
2016	Yamaha	AUS	THA; 11	SPA	NED	ITA	MAL	GBR	ITA	ITA	GER	FRA	SPA	QAT	31st	5
2017	Yamaha	AUS	THA; 2	SPA	NED	ITA	GBR	ITA	GER	POR	FRA	SPA	QAT		21st	20
2018	Yamaha	AUS	THA; 14	SPA	NED	ITA	GBR	CZE	ITA	POR	FRA	ARG	QAT		30th	2
