= 2020 Asia Talent Cup =

Motorcycle racing series

2020 Asia Talent Cup
Previous:	2019	Next:	2021

The 2020 Honda Idemitsu Asia Talent Cup had the seventh season of the Asia Talent Cup and its cancelled due to COVID-19 pandemic. Japanese rider Kanta Hamada won the first race and Malaysian rider Syarifuddin Azman won the second race. The 2020 Asia Talent Cup championship was not counted.

== Entry list ==
2020 entry list
No.	Rider	Rounds
2	(Japan) Rei Wakamatsu	1
3	(Indonesia) Fadillah Aditama	
5	(Japan) Gun Mie	1
6	(Australia) Carter Thompson	1
7	(India) Mohamed Mikhail Salih	1
8	(Japan) Kanta Hamada	1
9	(Thailand) Thanakorn Lakham	
10	(Indonesia) Herjun Firdaus	
11	(Indonesia) Herlian Dandi	
12	(Australia) Max Gibbons	1
13	(Malaysia) Syarifuddin Azman	1
14	(Japan) Shoki Igarashi	1
15	(Japan) Taiyo Furusato	1
16	(Thailand) Watcharin Tubtimon	
17 / in races 22	(Japan) Masaya Hongo	
17	(Turkey) Keleb Satici	1
18	(Australia) Harrison Voight	1
19	(Indonesia) Azryan Dheyo	
20	(Malaysia) Sharul Sharil	1
22	(Thailand) Thurakjj Buapa	
22	(Japan) Masaya Hongo	1
Source: AsiaTalentCup.com

== Race calendar and results ==
Rnd.		Circuit	Date	Pole position	Winning rider
1	R1	(Qatar) Losail International Circuit	07 March	(Japan) Taiyo Furusato	(Japan) Kanta Hamada
1	R2	(Qatar) Losail International Circuit	08 March	(Japan) Taiyo Furusato	(Malaysia) Syarifuddin Azman

=== Cancelled Races ===
The following Grand prix were the scheduled Grand prix for the 2020 Asia Talent Cup, but were cancelled.

2020 cancelled races
Round	Date	Circuit
(Australia) 2020 Australian Superbike Championship	09 & 10 May	The Bend Motorsport Park
2020 Malaysia Superbike Championship	08 & 09 August	Sepang International Circuit
(Thailand) 2020 MotoGP World Championship	03 & 04 October	Chang International Circuit
(Japan) 2020 MotoGP World Championship	17 & 18 October	Motegi Circuit
(Malaysia) 2020 MotoGP World Championship	31 October & 01 November	Sepang International Circuit

== Championship standings ==
Scoring system

Points were awarded to the top fifteen finishers. A rider had to finish the race to earn points.

Position	1st	2nd	3rd	4th	5th	6th	7th	8th	9th	10th	11th	12th	13th	14th	15th
Points	25	20	16	13	11	10	9	8	7	6	5	4	3	2	1

Pos.	Rider	QAT (Qatar)		AUS (Australia)		MAL1 (Malaysia)		THA (Thailand)		JPN (Japan)		MAL2 (Malaysia)		Pts
Pos.	Rider	R1	R2	R1	R2	R1	R2	R1	R2	R1	R2	R1	R2	Pts
1	(Japan) Kanta Hamada	1^{F}	2	C	C	C	C	C	C	C	C	C	C	45
2	(Malaysia) Syarifuddin Azman	3	1	C	C	C	C	C	C	C	C	C	C	41
3	(Japan) Taiyo Furusato	2^{P}	4^{P}	C	C	C	C	C	C	C	C	C	C	33
4	(Japan) Gun Mie	4	5^{F}	C	C	C	C	C	C	C	C	C	C	24
5	(Australia) Harrison Voight	12	3	C	C	C	C	C	C	C	C	C	C	20
6	(Japan) Shoki Igarashi	5	7	C	C	C	C	C	C	C	C	C	C	20
7	(Australia) Max Gibbons	10	6	C	C	C	C	C	C	C	C	C	C	16
8	(Malaysia) Sharul Sharil	6	10	C	C	C	C	C	C	C	C	C	C	16
9	(Japan) Rei Wakamatsu	8	8	C	C	C	C	C	C	C	C	C	C	16
10	(Japan) Masaya Hongo	7	12	C	C	C	C	C	C	C	C	C	C	13
11	(India) Mohamed Mikail Salih	11	9	C	C	C	C	C	C	C	C	C	C	12
12	(Australia) Carter Thompson	9	11	C	C	C	C	C	C	C	C	C	C	12
13	(Turkey) Keleb Satici	Ret	Ret	C	C	C	C	C	C	C	C	C	C	0
Pos.	Rider	R1	R2	R1	R2	R1	R2	R1	R2	R1	R2	R1	R2	Pts
Pos.	Rider	QAT (Qatar)		AUS (Australia)		MAL1 (Malaysia)		THA (Thailand)		JPN (Japan)		MAL2 (Malaysia)		Pts

Colour	Result
Gold	Winner
Silver	Second place
Bronze	Third place
Green	Points classification
Blue	Non-points classification
Blue	Non-classified finish (NC)
Purple	Retired, not classified (Ret)
Red	Did not qualify (DNQ)
Red	Did not pre-qualify (DNPQ)
Black	Disqualified (DSQ)
White	Did not start (DNS)
White	Withdrew (WD)
White	Race cancelled (C)
Blank	Did not practice (DNP)
Blank	Did not arrive (DNA)
Blank	Excluded (EX)

P – Pole position
