= 2022 Asia Road Racing Championship =

27th season Asia Road Racing Championship

2022 Asia Road Racing Championship
Previous:	2021	Next:	2023

The 2022 Idemitsu FIM Asia Road Racing Championship was the 27th season of the Asia Road Racing Championship. The season started on 25 March at Chang International Circuit in Thailand and ended on 20 November back at Chang International Circuit.

== Calendar and results ==
Round	Circuit	Date	ASB1000 Winners	SS600 Winners	AP250 Winners	UB150 Winners
1	(Thailand) Chang International Circuit	25–27 March	R1: (Malaysia) Zaqhwan Zaidi	R1: (Indonesia) Andi Farid Izdihar	R1: (Indonesia) Rheza Danica Ahrens	R1: (Malaysia) Izzat Zaidi Salehan
1	(Thailand) Chang International Circuit	25–27 March	R2: (Thailand) Apiwat Wongthananon	R2: (Malaysia) Helmi Azman	R2: (Indonesia) Andy Muhammad Fadly	R2: (Malaysia) Ahmad Afif Amran
2	(Malaysia) Sepang International Circuit	27–29 May	R1: (Malaysia) Kasma Daniel Kasmayudin	R1: (Malaysia) Ibrahim Norrodin	R1: (Indonesia) Andy Muhammad Fadly	R1: (Malaysia) Hafiza Rofa
2	(Malaysia) Sepang International Circuit	27–29 May	R2: (Japan) Haruki Noguchi	R2: (Malaysia) Helmi Azman	R2: (Indonesia) Andy Muhammad Fadly	R2: (Malaysia) Narizul Izzat Bahauddin
3	(Japan) Sportsland Sugo	12–14 August	R1: (Japan) Haruki Noguchi	R1: (Japan) Kohta Arakawa	R1: (Japan) Takahide Tanaka	R1: (Indonesia) Wahyu Aji Trilaksana
3	(Japan) Sportsland Sugo	12–14 August	R2: (Japan) Haruki Noguchi	R2: (Japan) Kohta Arakawa	R2: (Indonesia) Adenanta Putra	R2: (Malaysia) Izzat Zaidi Salehan
4	(Malaysia) Sepang International Circuit	6–9 October	R1: (Thailand) Anupab Sarmoon	R1: (Indonesia) Andi Farid Izdihar	R1: (Indonesia) Adenanta Putra	R1: (Malaysia) Izzat Zaidi Salehan
4	(Malaysia) Sepang International Circuit	6–9 October	R2: (Japan) Haruki Noguchi	R2: (Malaysia) Azroy Hakeem Anuar	R2: (Indonesia) Herjun Atna Firdaus	R2: (Malaysia) Shafiq Rasol
5	(Thailand) Chang International Circuit	18–20 November	R1: (Malaysia) Kasma Daniel Kasmayudin	R1: (Indonesia) Andi Farid Izdihar	R1: (Indonesia) Herjun Atna Firdaus	R1: (Philippines) April King Mascardo
5	(Thailand) Chang International Circuit	18–20 November	R2: (Thailand) Suhathai Chaemsup	R2: (Indonesia) Andi Farid Izdihar	R2: (Indonesia) Rheza Danica Ahrens	R2: (Malaysia) Ahmad Fazli Sham

=== Calendar changes ===
- Prior to the start of the season, Round 3 was scheduled to be held between 1–3 July at a circuit that was to be announced later. However, it was announced on 28 May that the Round 4 stop at Sportsland Sugo scheduled for 12–14 August would act as the new Round 3.
- On 22 July, it was announced that the Round 4 stop at Zhuhai International Circuit was moved to Sepang International Circuit in Malaysia due to COVID-19 restrictions in China. The round 4 also to be run alongside the final round of Malaysia Superbike Championship (MSBK).

== Teams and riders ==
2022 ASB1000 entries
Team	Constructor	No.	Rider	Rounds
(Malaysia) ONEXOX BMW TKKR Team	BMW	25	(Malaysia) Azlan Shah Kamaruzaman	All
(Malaysia) ONEXOX BMW TKKR Team	BMW	72	(Malaysia) Adam Norrodin	All
(Malaysia) Horizon Racing Team	BMW	83	(Malaysia) Farid Badrul	4 *
(Philippines) Access Plus Racing	Ducati	77	(Philippines) TJ Alberto	1–2
(Philippines) Access Plus Racing	Ducati	100	(Thailand) Thitipong Warokorn	1–2
(Japan) Honda Asia-Dream Racing with SHOWA	Honda	21	(Malaysia) Zaqhwan Zaidi	All
(Japan) Honda Asia-Dream Racing with SHOWA	Honda	31	(Indonesia) Gerry Salim	All
(Japan) K.W. Racing	Honda	35	(Japan) Kousuke Akiyoshi	3
(Philippines) SDG Motor Sports HARC-PRO Ph.	Honda	71	(Japan) Ikuhiro Enokido	5
(Philippines) SDG Motor Sports HARC-PRO Ph.	Honda	73	(Japan) Haruki Noguchi	1–4
(Thailand) EEST NJT Racing	Honda	82	(Thailand) Suhathai Chaemsup	5
(Thailand) Astemo SI Racing with Thai Honda	Honda	123	(Thailand) Passawit Thitivararak	All
(Malaysia) ESRA Racing Team	Honda	88	(Malaysia) Syukri Mat Zoki	4 *
(Malaysia) ESRA Racing Team	Kawasaki	555	(Australia) Michael Luke Stone	4 *
Yamaha Thailand Racing Team	Yamaha	24	(Thailand) Apiwat Wongthananon	All
Yamaha Thailand Racing Team	Yamaha	500	(Thailand) Anupab Sarmoon	All
(Thailand) Dog Fight Racing	Yamaha	26	(Japan) Otojiro Tanimoto	3
(Thailand) Dog Fight Racing	Yamaha	67	(Japan) Rei Toshima	3
(Japan) Yamaha Racing Team ASEAN	Yamaha	27	(Malaysia) Kasma Daniel Kasmayudin	All
(Japan) Yamaha Racing Team ASEAN	Yamaha	76	(Japan) Yuki Ito	All
(Japan) Team GYTR	Yamaha	75	(Japan) Keisuke Maeda	3
(Japan) Hirostech Team Tomy	Yamaha	85	(Japan) Shinichi Nakatomi	3
(Malaysia) Victor Racing Team	Yamaha	33	(Japan) Yusuke Nakamura	5
(Malaysia) Victor Racing Team	Yamaha	50	(Japan) Hideyuki Okada	5
(Malaysia) Victor Racing Team	Yamaha	99	(Malaysia) Ahmad Daniel Haiqal	2
(Thailand) YAMAHA Andreani Nexzter Anucha Racing Team	Yamaha	109	(Thailand) Anucha Nakcharoensri	5
(India) RACR Castrol Power 1 Ultimate	Yamaha	67	(India) Rajini Krishnan	4 *
(Malaysia) Savitar Racing Team Asia	Yamaha	14	(Malaysia) Raja Nazeem Iskandar	4 *
(Malaysia) Savitar Racing Team Asia	Yamaha	44	(Yemen) Osama Mareai	4 *
(Malaysia) Savitar Racing Team Asia	Suzuki	16	(Malaysia) Teo Yew Joe	4 *
(Malaysia) Mobilub Suzuki Racing Team	Suzuki	7	(Malaysia) Tee Wee Jin	4 *
(Malaysia) Mobilub Suzuki Racing Team	Suzuki	66	(Malaysia) Khoo Chee Yen	4 *
(Malaysia) Mobilub Suzuki Racing Team	Suzuki	85	(Japan) Takuya Tsuda	4 *
2022 SS600 entries
Team	Constructor	No.	Rider	Rounds
(Japan) Moto Bum Honda	Honda	15	(Japan) Motoharu Ito	3
(Japan) Moto Bum Honda	Honda	54	(Japan) Kohta Arakawa	3
(Indonesia) ASTRA Honda Racing Team	Honda	16	(Indonesia) Irfan Ardiansyah	All
(Indonesia) ASTRA Honda Racing Team	Honda	27	(Indonesia) Andi Farid Izdihar	All
(Malaysia) Boon Siew Honda Racing Team	Honda	20	(Malaysia) Azroy Hakeem Anuar	All
(Malaysia) Boon Siew Honda Racing Team	Honda	32	(Malaysia) Helmi Azman	All
(Malaysia) Boon Siew Honda Racing Team	Honda	89	(Malaysia) Khairul Idham Pawi	All
Honda Racing Thailand	Honda	35	(Thailand) Kritchaporn Kaewsonthi	All
Honda Racing Thailand	Honda	41	(Thailand) Nakarin Atiratphuvapat	All
(Thailand) Astemo SI Racing with Thai Honda	Honda	44	(Thailand) Muklada Sarapuech	3
(Thailand) EEST NJT Racing	Honda	100	(Thailand) Kondanai Keardkaew	1–4
(Thailand) EEST NJT Racing	Honda	999	(Thailand) Chanon Inta	5
(Chinese Taipei) 11 Racing	Yamaha	11	(Chinese Taipei) Chiang Chih Ying	4–5
(Malaysia) Victor Racing Team	Yamaha	12	(Japan) Sota Furuyama	4
(Thailand) Yamaha Hispeed Hung Modified Racing Team	Yamaha	19	(Thailand) Yanasorn Yanaphan	1
(Thailand) Yamaha Hispeed Hung Modified Racing Team	Yamaha	90	(Thailand) Kanatat Jaiman	1, 5
(Malaysia) ONEXOX TKKR Team	Yamaha	23	(Malaysia) Ramdan Rosli	3–5
(Malaysia) ONEXOX TKKR Team	Yamaha	24	(Malaysia) Izam Ikmal	1–2
(Malaysia) ONEXOX TKKR Team	Yamaha	51	(Japan) Keito Abe	3–5
(Japan) Webike Team Norick Yamaha	Yamaha	26	(Japan) Maiki Abe	3
Yamaha Racing Indonesia	Yamaha	36	(Indonesia) Faerozi Toreqottullah	All
Yamaha Racing Indonesia	Yamaha	55	(Indonesia) Galang Hendra Pratama	All
Yamaha Thailand Racing Team	Yamaha	56	(Thailand) Ratthapong Wilairot	All
(Malaysia) SIC Racing	Yamaha	66	(Malaysia) Ibrahim Norrodin	All
(Thailand) TNP Motorsports Team	Yamaha	98	(Thailand) Peerapong Boonlert	5
(Thailand) Yamaha HI Speed Team	Yamaha	168	(Thailand) Krittapat Keankum	5
2022 AP250 entries
Team	Constructor	No.	Rider	Rounds
Honda Racing India	Honda	18	(India) Senthil Chandrasekaran	All
Honda Racing India	Honda	80	(India) Sethu Rajiv	All
(Malaysia) Idemitsu Boon Siew Honda Racing Team	Honda	19	(Malaysia) Idlan Haqimi Raduan	All
(Malaysia) Idemitsu Boon Siew Honda Racing Team	Honda	41	(Malaysia) Irfan Haykal	4–5
(Malaysia) Idemitsu Boon Siew Honda Racing Team	Honda	98	(Malaysia) Firdaus Hamdan	2
(Indonesia) ASTRA Honda Racing Team	Honda	21	(Indonesia) Adenanta Putra	All
(Indonesia) ASTRA Honda Racing Team	Honda	46	(Indonesia) Herjun Atna Firdaus	All
(Indonesia) ASTRA Honda Racing Team	Honda	123	(Indonesia) Rheza Danica Ahrens	All
(Japan) Team TEC2&YSS NTR. JP	Honda	26	(Japan) Takahide Tanaka	3
(Malaysia) HORIZON Racing Team	Honda	36	(Malaysia) Sharul Ezwan	4
LFN HP969 Indonesia Racing Team	Honda	50	(Indonesia) Rafid Topan Sucipto	All
LFN HP969 Indonesia Racing Team	Honda	93	(Indonesia) Fitriansyah Kete	All
Honda Racing Vietnam	Honda	65	(Vietnam) Cao Viet Nam	1–3, 5
(Japan) Endless Team Shanti	Honda	73	(Japan) Ryunosuke Nakamura	3
(Japan) Shin Riding Service	Honda	88	(Japan) Yuito Nomura	3
Honda Racing Thailand	Honda	149	(Thailand) Jakkreephat Phuettisan	5
Honda Racing Thailand	Honda	188	(Thailand) Piyawat Patoomyos	All
(Indonesia) Motul Sniper Manual Tech Racing Team	Kawasaki	37	(Japan) Aiki Iyoshi	All
(Indonesia) Motul Sniper Manual Tech Racing Team	Kawasaki	108	(Indonesia) Andy Muhammad Fadly	All
(Malaysia) ONEXOX TKKR Racing Team	Yamaha	13	(Malaysia) Akid Aziz	All
(Malaysia) ONEXOX TKKR Racing Team	Yamaha	92	(Malaysia) Muzakkir Mohamed	All
(Malaysia) ONEXOX TKKR Racing Team	Yamaha	222	(Indonesia) Reynaldo Ratukore	All
(Malaysia) Victor Racing Team	Yamaha	15	(Hong Kong) Leong Nang Tse	4–5
Yamaha Racing Indonesia	Yamaha	57	(Indonesia) Aldi Satya Mahendra	All
Yamaha Racing Indonesia	Yamaha	96	(Indonesia) Anggi Setiawan	All
2022 UB150 entries
Team	Constructor	No.	Rider	Rounds
(Malaysia) SCK Honda Racing Team	Honda	12	(Malaysia) Afizad Supaat	4
(Malaysia) SCK Honda Racing Team	Honda	13	(Malaysia) Asyraf Daniel Zamri	2
(Malaysia) SCK Honda Racing Team	Honda	212	(Indonesia) Kiandra Ramadhipa	2, 4
(Malaysia) Honda Yuzy Team	Honda	61	(Malaysia) Syazras Shahrol Yuzy	2, 4
LFN HP969 Indonesia Racing Team	Honda	202	(Indonesia) Dimas Juli Atmoko	All
LFN HP969 Indonesia Racing Team	Honda	257	(Indonesia) Muhammad Jordan Badaru	All
Honda Racing Vietnam	Honda	178	(Vietnam) Nguyen Anh Tuan	All
Honda Racing Vietnam	Honda	193	(Vietnam) Nguyen Duc Thanh	All
(Malaysia) Yamalube Gen Blu Ahm Motor Sports	Yamaha	11	(Malaysia) Ahmad Fazrul Sham	2
(Thailand) Team One For All	Yamaha	14	(Thailand) Peerapong Luiboonpeng	All
(Thailand) Team One For All	Yamaha	521	(Japan) Aoi Uezu	1–4
(Thailand) Team One For All	Yamaha	410	(Thailand) Passkon Sanluang	5
(Indonesia) 4S1M Yamaha Racing Team	Yamaha	22	(Philippines) John Emerson Inguito	All
(Indonesia) 4S1M Yamaha Racing Team	Yamaha	23	(Indonesia) Gupita Kresna Wardhana	All
(Malaysia) ONEXOX TKKR Racing Team	Yamaha	24	(Malaysia) Hafiza Rofa	All
(Malaysia) ONEXOX TKKR Racing Team	Yamaha	46	(Malaysia) Ahmad Fazli Sham	All
(Malaysia) ONEXOX TKKR Racing Team	Yamaha	60	(Indonesia) Wahyu Aji Trilaksana	All
(Malaysia) ONEXOX TKKR Racing Team	Yamaha	122	(Malaysia) Shafiq Rasol	4
(Malaysia) Uma Racing Yamaha Maju Motor Asia Team	Yamaha	27	(Malaysia) Mohammad Syafiq Rosli	All
(Malaysia) Uma Racing Yamaha Maju Motor Asia Team	Yamaha	87	(Malaysia) Nazirul Izzat Bahauddin	All
(Indonesia) Pitsbike JRT OneWay	Yamaha	42	(Indonesia) Hafid Pratamaditya Nursandi	All
(Indonesia) Pitsbike JRT OneWay	Yamaha	98	(Malaysia) Izzat Zaidi Salehan	All
UMA Racing MMR Yamaha Philippines	Yamaha	43	(Philippines) April King Mascardo	All
UMA Racing MMR Yamaha Philippines	Yamaha	124	(Philippines) Gian Carlo Mauricio	All
Cardinals Racing Team Malaysia	Yamaha	50	(Malaysia) Ahmad Afif Amran	All
Cardinals Racing Team Malaysia	Yamaha	55	(Malaysia) Aiman Tahiruddin	1–4
Cardinals Racing Team Malaysia	Yamaha	555	(Thailand) Thurakij Buapa	5
LFN HP969 Indonesia Racing Team	Yamaha	157	(Indonesia) Murobbil Vittoni	All

Rider with asterisk is Malaysia Superbike Championship participants that ineligible to score any Asia Superbike 1000 points.

All teams use series-specified Dunlop tyres.

== Championship standings ==
=== Asia Superbike 1000 ===
Pos.	Rider	Bike	CHA (Thailand)		SEP (Malaysia)		SUG (Japan)		SEP (Malaysia)		CHA (Thailand)		Pts
Pos.	Rider	Bike	R1	R2	R1	R2	R1	R2	R1	R2	R1	R2	Pts
1	(Malaysia) Zaqhwan Zaidi	Honda	**1**	**2**	4	2	2	4	8	3	5	5	157
2	(Japan) Haruki Noguchi	Honda	3	4	2	1	**1**	**1**	11	1			154
3	(Malaysia) Kasma Daniel Kasmayudin	Yamaha	6	Ret	**1**	**4**	3	2	**5**	**2**	**1**	**4**	153
4	(Thailand) Anupab Sarmoon	Yamaha	2	3	5	6	4	7	1	5	2	6	145
5	(Thailand) Apiwat Wongthananon	Yamaha	4	1	3	5	DNS	5	2	Ret	3	Ret	112
6	(Japan) Yuki Ito	Yamaha	10	10	Ret	9	7	3	6	4	8	7	84
7	(Malaysia) Azlan Shah Kamaruzaman	BMW	Ret	6	Ret	7	9	9	4	6	6	3	82
8	(Malaysia) Adam Norrodin	BMW	7	7	6	3	Ret	DNS	3	7	Ret	9	76
9	(Thailand) Passawit Thitivararak	Honda	5	5	10	8	10	12	9	Ret	4	10	72
10	(Indonesia) Gerry Salim	Honda	8	9	7	10	8	11	10	8	7	11	71
11	(Thailand) Suhathai Chaemsup	Honda									9	1	32
12	(Japan) Ikuhiro Enokido	Honda									10	2	26
13	(Japan) Rei Toshima	Yamaha					6	6					20
14	(Thailand) Thitipong Warokorn	Ducati	9	8	DNS	DNS							15
15	(Philippines) TJ Alberto	Ducati	Ret	DNS	8	11							13
16	(Thailand) Anucha Nakcharoensri	Yamaha									12	8	12
17	(Malaysia) Ahmad Daniel Haiqal	Yamaha			9	12							11
18	(Japan) Keisuke Maeda	Yamaha					5	Ret					11
19	(Japan) Yusuke Nakamura	Yamaha									11	12	9
20	(Japan) Kousuke Akiyoshi	Honda					Ret	8					8
21	(Japan) Shinichi Nakatomi	Yamaha					DNS	10					6
22	(Japan) Otojiro Tanimoto	Yamaha					DNS	DNS					0
23	(Japan) Hideyuki Okada	Yamaha									Ret	Ret	0
Pos.	Rider	Bike	CHA (Thailand)		SEP (Malaysia)		SUG (Japan)		SEP (Malaysia)		CHA (Thailand)		Pts

Colour	Result
Gold	Winner
Silver	Second place
Bronze	Third place
Green	Points classification
Blue	Non-points classification
Blue	Non-classified finish (NC)
Purple	Retired, not classified (Ret)
Red	Did not qualify (DNQ)
Red	Did not pre-qualify (DNPQ)
Black	Disqualified (DSQ)
White	Did not start (DNS)
White	Withdrew (WD)
White	Race cancelled (C)
Blank	Did not practice (DNP)
Blank	Did not arrive (DNA)
Blank	Excluded (EX)

**Bold** – Pole position
Italics – Fastest lap
† – Rider deceased

=== Supersports 600 ===
Pos.	Rider	Bike	CHA (Thailand)		SEP (Malaysia)		SUG (Japan)		SEP (Malaysia)		CHA (Thailand)		Pts
Pos.	Rider	Bike	R1	R2	R1	R2	R1	R2	R1	R2	R1	R2	Pts
1	(Indonesia) Andi Farid Izdihar	Honda	**1**	**12**	**5**	**2**	2	14	**1**	**15**	1	1	158
2	(Malaysia) Helmi Azman	Honda	2	1	4	1	11	3	3	2	9	5	158
3	(Thailand) Nakarin Atiratphuvapat	Honda	7	2	6	4	4	4	4	4	2	4	137
4	(Malaysia) Azroy Hakeem Anuar	Honda	DNS	DNS	3	8	5	2	2	1	3	17	116
5	(Malaysia) Ibrahim Norrodin	Yamaha	3	3	1	6	DNS	DNS	5	3	6	9	111
6	(Malaysia) Khairul Idham Pawi	Honda	5	5	2	3	12	9	8	5	8	15	97
7	(Indonesia) Irfan Ardiansyah	Honda	4	4	7	9	6	10	9	6	7	Ret	84
8	(Indonesia) Galang Hendra Pratama	Yamaha	6	8	8	5	7	7	7	7	12	11	82
9	(Thailand) Ratthapong Wilairot	Yamaha	Ret	6	9	11	8	8	6	Ret	5	2	79
10	(Thailand) Kritchaporn Kaewsonthi	Honda	Ret	7	Ret	7	14	12	10	8	**4**	**3**	67
11	(Japan) Kohta Arakawa	Honda					**1**	**1**					50
12	(Japan) Keito Abe	Yamaha					3	Ret	Ret	9	11	8	36
13	(Thailand) Kondanai Keardkaew	Honda	10	11	11	10	15	15	11	12			33
14	(Indonesia) Faerozi Toreqottullah	Yamaha	Ret	9	DNS	DNS	13	11	Ret	10	13	13	27
15	(Thailand) Kanatat Jaiman	Yamaha	8	10							Ret	12	18
16	(Japan) Maiki Abe	Yamaha					9	6					17
17	(Thailand) Muklada Sarapuech	Honda					10	5					17
18	(Thailand) Krittapat Keankum	Yamaha									10	7	18
19	(Malaysia) Izam Ikmal	Yamaha	9	Ret	10	Ret							13
20	(Thailand) Peerapong Boonlert	Yamaha									Ret	6	10
21	(Malaysia) Ramdan Rosli	Yamaha					Ret	13	Ret	11	Ret	14	10
21	(Thailand) Chanon Inta	Honda									14	10	8
22	(Thailand) Yanasorn Yanaphan	Yamaha	11	Ret									5
23	(Japan) Sota Furuyama	Yamaha							Ret	13			3
24	(Chinese Taipei) Chiang Chih Ying	Yamaha							Ret	14	15	16	3
25	(Japan) Motoharu Ito	Honda					Ret	DNS					0
Pos.	Rider	Bike	CHA (Thailand)		SEP (Malaysia)		SUG (Japan)		SEP (Malaysia)		CHA (Thailand)		Pts

Colour	Result
Gold	Winner
Silver	Second place
Bronze	Third place
Green	Points classification
Blue	Non-points classification
Blue	Non-classified finish (NC)
Purple	Retired, not classified (Ret)
Red	Did not qualify (DNQ)
Red	Did not pre-qualify (DNPQ)
Black	Disqualified (DSQ)
White	Did not start (DNS)
White	Withdrew (WD)
White	Race cancelled (C)
Blank	Did not practice (DNP)
Blank	Did not arrive (DNA)
Blank	Excluded (EX)

**Bold** – Pole position
Italics – Fastest lap

=== Asia Production 250 ===
Pos.	Rider	Bike	CHA (Thailand)		SEP (Malaysia)		SUG (Japan)		SEP (Malaysia)		CHA (Thailand)		Pts
Pos.	Rider	Bike	R1	R2	R1	R2	R1	R2	R1	R2	R1	R2	Pts
1	(Indonesia) Andy Muhammad Fadly	Kawasaki	3	1	**1**	**1**	12	10	**6**	**6**	12	8	133
2	(Indonesia) Rheza Danica Ahrens	Honda	1	3	2	3	**14**	**Ret**	4	16	3	1	133
3	(Indonesia) Herjun Atna Firdaus	Honda	10	7	Ret	6	Ret	3	3	1	1	4	120
4	(Indonesia) Adenanta Putra	Honda	Ret	Ret	4	5	Ret	1	1	2	2	Ret	114
5	(Indonesia) Aldi Satya Mahendra	Yamaha	12	4	6	4	Ret	2	2	3	5	13	110
6	(Thailand) Piyawat Patoomyos	Honda	**2**	**Ret**	7	7	3	7	Ret	5	**4**	**2**	107
7	(Indonesia) Reynaldo Ratukore	Yamaha	5	5	15	11	4	5	5	10	7	9	82
8	(Japan) Aiki Iyoshi	Kawasaki	7	6	3	2	13	Ret	Ret	18	10	3	80
9	(Indonesia) Rafid Topan Sucipto	Honda	4	2	10	9	7	6	7	17	11	Ret	79
10	(Indonesia) Anggi Setiawan	Yamaha	6	9	5	Ret	DNS	11	5	4	6	Ret	67
11	(Malaysia) Akid Aziz	Yamaha	Ret	12	11	8	6	8	9	8	15	Ret	51
12	(Malaysia) Muzakkir Mohamed	Yamaha	Ret	DNS	8	10	9	12	10	15	8	5	51
13	(Indonesia) Fitriansyah Kete	Honda	8	10	14	14	Ret	9	12	Ret	16	7	38
14	(Vietnam) Cao Viet Nam	Honda	9	8	9	12	11	13			13	Ret	37
15	(India) Sethu Rajiv	Honda	13	11	12	15	5	17	14	11	17	10	37
16	(Malaysia) Idlan Haqimi Raduan	Honda	11	Ret	Ret	13	10	14	11	7	14	12	36
17	(Japan) Ryunosuke Nakamura	Honda					2	4					33
18	(Japan) Takahide Tanaka	Honda					1	Ret					25
19	(Thailand) Jakkreephat Phuettisan	Honda									9	6	17
20	(India) Senthil Chandrasekaran	Honda	Ret	13	13	16	Ret	15	15	13	19	14	13
21	(Japan) Yuito Nomura	Honda					8	16					8
22	(Malaysia) Sharul Ezwan	Honda							Ret	9			7
23	(Malaysia) Irfan Haykal Amid	Honda							13	12	18	Ret	7
24	(Hong Kong) Leong Nang Tse	Yamaha							16	14	20	11	7
25	(Malaysia) Firdaus Hamdan	Honda			16	17							0
Pos.	Rider	Bike	CHA (Thailand)		SEP (Malaysia)		SUG (Japan)		SEP (Malaysia)		CHA (Thailand)		Pts

Colour	Result
Gold	Winner
Silver	Second place
Bronze	Third place
Green	Points classification
Blue	Non-points classification
Blue	Non-classified finish (NC)
Purple	Retired, not classified (Ret)
Red	Did not qualify (DNQ)
Red	Did not pre-qualify (DNPQ)
Black	Disqualified (DSQ)
White	Did not start (DNS)
White	Withdrew (WD)
White	Race cancelled (C)
Blank	Did not practice (DNP)
Blank	Did not arrive (DNA)
Blank	Excluded (EX)

**Bold** – Pole position
Italics – Fastest lap

=== Underbone 150 ===
Pos.	Rider	Bike	CHA (Thailand)		SEP (Malaysia)		SUG (Japan)		SEP (Malaysia)		CHA (Thailand)		Pts
Pos.	Rider	Bike	R1	R2	R1	R2	R1	R2	R1	R2	R1	R2	Pts
1	(Indonesia) Wahyu Aji Trilaksana	Yamaha	3	2	2	7	1	Ret	3	2	13	5	140
2	(Malaysia) Izzat Zaidi Salehan	Yamaha	1	10	6	5	4	1	1	Ret	2	12	139
3	(Philippines) April King Mascardo	Yamaha	9	5	10	8	13	2	6	Ret	1	15	91
4	(Malaysia) Hafiza Rofa	Yamaha	DNS	DNS	1	9	5	9	12	5	8	3	89
5	(Malaysia) Ahmad Afif Amran	Yamaha	7	1	5	Ret	6	5	Ret	6	4	16	89
6	(Malaysia) Mohammad Syafiq Rosli	Yamaha	Ret	12	8	DNS	8	11	5	4	3	2	85
7	(Philippines) John Emerson Inguito	Yamaha	11	9	Ret	3	3	10	4	16	6	8	81
8	(Malaysia) Nazirul Izzat Bahauddin	Yamaha	DNS	6	14	1	17	3	2	Ret	14	10	81
9	(Malaysia) Ahmad Fazli Sham	Yamaha	DNS	DNS	7	Ret	9	Ret	8	3	9	1	72
10	(Indonesia) Murobbil Vittoni	Yamaha	Ret	3	15	6	11	4	15	7	DSQ	4	68
11	(Indonesia) Muhammad Jordan Badaru	Honda	2	8	16	10	16	12	Ret	11	12	6	57
12	(Indonesia) Dimas Juli Atmoko	Honda	4	4	11	Ret	15	6	Ret	13	11	Ret	50
13	(Indonesia) Gupita Kresna Wardhana	Yamaha	**Ret**	**7**	3	13	7	DNS	**13**	**Ret**	DNS	7	49
14	(Thailand) Peerapong Luiboonpeng	Yamaha	Ret	14	13	4	2	Ret	16	Ret	Ret	9	45
15	(Indonesia) Kiandra Ramadhipa	Honda			9	2			Ret	10			33
16	(Malaysia) Shafiq Rasol	Yamaha							10	1			31
17	(Japan) Aoi Uezu	Yamaha	6	11	12	Ret	**12**	**8**	Ret				31
18	(Indonesia) Hafid Pratamaditya Nursandi	Yamaha	DNS	Ret	Ret	Ret	10	13	14	8	10	14	27
19	(Malaysia) Aiman Tahiruddin	Yamaha	5	17	Ret	Ret	Ret	7	11	Ret			25
20	(Vietnam) Nguyen Anh Tuan	Honda	8	13	18	11	19	14	17	15	15	Ret	20
21	(Vietnam) Nguyen Duc Thanh	Honda	10	15	DNS	12	18	Ret	18	12	Ret	13	18
22	(Malaysia) Ahmad Fazrul Sham	Yamaha			4	14							15
23	(Malaysia) Syazras Shahrol Yuzy	Honda			**Ret**	**Ret**			9	9			14
24	(Thailand) Passkon Sanluang	Yamaha									7	11	14
25	(Philippines) Gian Carlo Mauricio	Yamaha	Ret	16	Ret	Ret	14	Ret	7	14	Ret	Ret	13
26	(Thailand) Thurakij Buapa	Yamaha									5	Ret	11
27	(Malaysia) Asyraf Daniel Zamri	Honda			17	Ret							0
28	(Malaysia) Afizad Supaat	Honda							Ret	Ret			0
Pos.	Rider	Bike	CHA (Thailand)		SEP (Malaysia)		SUG (Japan)		SEP (Malaysia)		CHA (Thailand)		Pts

Colour	Result
Gold	Winner
Silver	Second place
Bronze	Third place
Green	Points classification
Blue	Non-points classification
Blue	Non-classified finish (NC)
Purple	Retired, not classified (Ret)
Red	Did not qualify (DNQ)
Red	Did not pre-qualify (DNPQ)
Black	Disqualified (DSQ)
White	Did not start (DNS)
White	Withdrew (WD)
White	Race cancelled (C)
Blank	Did not practice (DNP)
Blank	Did not arrive (DNA)
Blank	Excluded (EX)

**Bold** – Pole position
Italics – Fastest lap

=== TVS Asia One-Make Championship ===
Pos.	Rider	Bike	SEP (Malaysia)		SUG (Japan)		SEP (Malaysia)		CHA (Thailand)		Pts
Pos.	Rider	Bike	R1	R2	R1	R2	R1	R2	R1	R2	Pts
1	(Thailand) Vorapong Malahuan	TVS Apache RR310	1	3	2	1	2	2	1	1	176
2	(Thailand) Watcharin Tubtimon	TVS Apache RR310	10	4	4	7	1	4	2	3	115
3	(Indonesia) Decky Tiarno Aldy	TVS Apache RR310	2	2	13	4	4	1	14	5	107
4	(Japan) Fugo Tanaka	TVS Apache RR310	DNP	DNP	3	3	7	3	3	2	93
5	(Indonesia) Agung Septian	TVS Apache RR310	11	5	5	5	3	5	10	8	79
6	(India) Ky Ahmed	TVS Apache RR310	8	6	10	10	6	7	5	6	70
7	(Singapore) Arsyad Rusydi	TVS Apache RR310	14	11	8	12	5	6	4	7	62
8	(Japan) Hayato Kobayashi	TVS Apache RR310	12	9	6	8	8	Ret	6	4	60
9	(Australia) James Frederic Jacobs	TVS Apache RR310	7	8	7	6	9	13	Ret	Ret	46
10	(Japan) Hiroki Ono	TVS Apache RR310	DNP	DNP	1	2					45
11	(Australia) Varis Felix Fleming	TVS Apache RR310	3	DNS	DNP	DNP	12	8	9	9	42
12	(India) Jagan Kumar	TVS Apache RR310	9	7	14	14	10	9	8	Ret	41
13	(Thailand) Natthaphon Kaewmun	TVS Apache RR310	6	Ret	12	11	11	12	12	11	37
14	(Malaysia) Muhammad Fitri Ashraf	TVS Apache RR310	5	1	DNP	DNP					36
15	(Japan) Miu Nakahara	TVS Apache RR310	15	12	9	9	13	10	13	Ret	31
16	(Thailand) Deepak Ravikumar	TVS Apache RR310	Ret	DNS	11	13	14	11	11	10	26
17	(Philippines) Kevin Eins Golbert G. Chang	TVS Apache RR310	4	10	DNP	DNP					19
18	(Indonesia) Muhammad Alief Adamsyah	TVS Apache RR310							7	12	13
19	(Malaysia) Md Harith Farhan Bahrain	TVS Apache RR310	13	DNP	DNP	DNP					3

Colour	Result
Gold	Winner
Silver	Second place
Bronze	Third place
Green	Points classification
Blue	Non-points classification
Blue	Non-classified finish (NC)
Purple	Retired, not classified (Ret)
Red	Did not qualify (DNQ)
Red	Did not pre-qualify (DNPQ)
Black	Disqualified (DSQ)
White	Did not start (DNS)
White	Withdrew (WD)
White	Race cancelled (C)
Blank	Did not practice (DNP)
Blank	Did not arrive (DNA)
Blank	Excluded (EX)

**Bold** – Pole position
Italics – Fastest lap
