= 2018 Asia Talent Cup =

Motorcycle racing serie held in 2018

2018 Asia Talent Cup
Previous:	2017	Next:	2019

The 2018 Idemitsu Asia Talent Cup was the fifth season of the Asia Talent Cup (ATC). The season featured 12 races held across six rounds, following the riders as they competed on identical Honda NSF250R machinery. Australian rider Billy Van Erde won the championship ahead of Japanese riders Haruki Noguchi and Sho Nishimura. He became the first ever Asia Talent Cup winner from Australia.

== Entry list ==
No.	Rider	Rounds
2	(Japan) Shota Kiuchi	1–2
3	(Japan) Sho Nishimura	All
4	(Indonesia) Afridza Munandar	All
5	(Thailand) Tatchakorn Buasri	All
6	(Thailand) Warit Thongnoppakun	2, 4, 6
7	(Indonesia) Mario Aji	All
8	(Japan) Koji Hirama	3–6
9	(Japan) Haruki Noguchi	All
10	(Japan) Toshiki Senda	All
11	(Japan) Takuma Matsuyama	3–6
12	(Indonesia) Lucky Hendriansya	All
13	(Australia) Senna Agius	1–2, 4–6
14	(Japan) Naoki Yamada	All
15	(Australia) Benjamin Baker	1–2, 4–5
16	(Indonesia) Adenanta Putra	All
17	(Thailand) Nitipong Saengsawang	All
18	(Philippines) Troy Alberto	All
19	(Australia) Billy Van Eerde	All
20	(Malaysia) Ibrahim Pawi	All
21	(Malaysia) Danial Sharil	All
22	(Indonesia) Agung Fachrul	All
23	(Thailand) Kopchai Sae Liw	1–5

== Race calendar and results ==
Rnd.		Circuit	Date	Pole position	Winning rider
1	R1	(Qatar) Losail International Circuit	17 March	(Indonesia) Agung Fachrul	(Japan) Haruki Noguchi
1	R2	(Qatar) Losail International Circuit	18 March	(Indonesia) Agung Fachrul	(Australia) Billy Van Eerde
2	R1	(Thailand) Chang International Circuit	24 March	(Japan) Haruki Noguchi	(Japan) Haruki Noguchi
2	R2	(Thailand) Chang International Circuit	25 March	(Japan) Haruki Noguchi	(Japan) Haruki Noguchi
3	R1	(Malaysia) Sepang International Circuit	16 June	(Malaysia) Danial Sharil	(Indonesia) Mario Aji
3	R2	(Malaysia) Sepang International Circuit	17 June	(Malaysia) Danial Sharil	(Australia) Billy Van Eerde
4	R1	(Thailand) Chang International Circuit	29 July	(Japan) Haruki Noguchi	(Malaysia) Danial Sharil
4	R2	(Thailand) Chang International Circuit	30 July	(Japan) Haruki Noguchi	(Malaysia) Danial Sharil
5	R1	(Japan) Twin Ring Motegi	14 October	(Indonesia) Mario Aji	(Japan) Takuma Matsuyama
5	R2	(Japan) Twin Ring Motegi	15 October	(Indonesia) Mario Aji	(Japan) Takuma Matsuyama
6	R1	(Malaysia) Sepang International Circuit	28 October	(Thailand) Tatchakorn Buasri	(Japan) Sho Nishimura
6	R2	(Malaysia) Sepang International Circuit	29 October	(Thailand) Tatchakorn Buasri	(Australia) Billy Van Eerde

== Championship standings ==
Scoring system

Points were awarded to the top fifteen finishers. A rider had to finish the race to earn points.

Position	1st	2nd	3rd	4th	5th	6th	7th	8th	9th	10th	11th	12th	13th	14th	15th
Points	25	20	16	13	11	10	9	8	7	6	5	4	3	2	1

Pos.	Rider	QAT (Qatar)		THA1 (Thailand)		MAL1 (Malaysia)		THA2 (Thailand)		JPN (Japan)		MAL2 (Malaysia)		Pts
Pos.	Rider	R1	R2	R1	R2	R1	R2	R1	R2	R1	R2	R1	R2	Pts
1	(Australia) Billy Van Eerde	7	1	3	2	2	1	2	7	7	3	11	1	199
2	(Japan) Haruki Noguchi	1	2	1^{P}	1^{P}	Ret	3	3^{P}	6^{P}	Ret	2	4	12	174
3	(Japan) Sho Nishimura	3	7	10	Ret	5	2	7	2	2	11	1	7	150
4	(Malaysia) Danial Sharil	9	10	4	7	3^{P}	6^{P}	1	1	3	Ret	2	Ret	147
5	(Indonesia) Mario Aji	2	4	2	Ret	1	9	Ret	5	Ret^{P}	Ret^{P}	3	5	123
6	(Thailand) Tatchakorn Buasri	10	9	9	Ret	6	10	13	3	4	5	7^{P}	2^{P}	108
7	(Japan) Takuma Matsuyama					11	4	10	12	1	1	6	4	101
8	(Indonesia) Lucky Hendriansya	17	16	13	12	4	11	4	4	5	Ret	5	3	87
9	(Indonesia) Agung Fachrul	8^{P}	8^{P}	Ret	6	8	12	12	11	8	8	9	11	75
10	(Indonesia) Afridza Munandar	6	5	5	3	Ret	Ret	Ret	8	13	Ret	Ret	Ret	59
11	(Indonesia) Adenanta Putra	5	12	7	Ret	Ret	DNS	5	10	Ret	6	Ret	10	59
12	(Japan) Toshiki Senda	4	3	12	Ret	Ret	7	Ret	13	15	Ret	Ret	6	56
13	(Thailand) Kopchai Sae Liw	11	11	8	5	Ret	8	6	9	Ret	DNS			54
14	(Japan) Koji Hirama					9	5	Ret	14	6	4	Ret	8	51
15	(Thailand) Warit Thongnoppakun			6	4			8	Ret			8	13	42
16	(Japan) Naoki Yamada	14	Ret	17	11	13	16	9	Ret	9	7	Ret	9	40
17	(Australia) Senna Agius	13	6	Ret	9			16	18	12	10	10	14	38
18	(Malaysia) Ibrahim Pawi	12	13	15	10	7	13	11	15	14	Ret	Ret	Ret	34
19	(Philippines) Troy Alberto	15	Ret	16	13	10	15	14	19	16	9	Ret	15	21
20	(Japan) Shota Kiuchi	16	14	11	8									15
21	(Thailand) Nitipong Saengsawang	Ret	15	Ret	14	12	14	Ret	16	10	Ret	Ret	DNS	15
22	(Australia) Benjamin Baker	Ret	Ret	14	Ret			15	17	11	DNS			8
Pos.	Rider	R1	R2	R1	R2	R1	R2	R1	R2	R1	R2	R1	R2	Pts
Pos.	Rider	QAT (Qatar)		THA1 (Thailand)		MAL1 (Malaysia)		THA2 (Thailand)		JPN (Japan)		MAL2 (Malaysia)		Pts

Colour	Result
Gold	Winner
Silver	Second place
Bronze	Third place
Green	Points classification
Blue	Non-points classification
Blue	Non-classified finish (NC)
Purple	Retired, not classified (Ret)
Red	Did not qualify (DNQ)
Red	Did not pre-qualify (DNPQ)
Black	Disqualified (DSQ)
White	Did not start (DNS)
White	Withdrew (WD)
White	Race cancelled (C)
Blank	Did not practice (DNP)
Blank	Did not arrive (DNA)
Blank	Excluded (EX)

P – Pole position
