= 2027 Moto4 Asia Cup =

Motorcycle road racing season

2027 Moto4 Asia Cup
| Previous: | 2026 | Next: | 2028 |

The 2027 Idemitsu Moto4 Asia Cup will be the thirteenth season of the competition, formerly known as the Asia Talent Cup, a motorcycle racing series organized by Dorna and sponsored by Idemitsu, which is intended for young riders across Asia and Oceania. The season features six rounds at circuits in Asia, with each round comprising two races, with the majority of the rounds serving as support races for MotoGP.

== Selected riders ==
The list of newly selected riders from the 2027 Selection Event at the Sepang International Kart Circuit was released on 28 October 2026. This list does not include returning riders. All riders will compete on identical 250cc Honda NSF250R motorcycles and use series-specified Pirelli tyres.

| No. | Rider |
|---|---|
| TBA | (Indonesia) Abimanyu Fermadi |
| TBA | (Indonesia) Clevan Octavianus |
| TBA | (Thailand) Suakien Meedet |
| TBA | (Thailand) Techin In-Aphai |
| TBA | (Qatar) Mohammed Almutawa |
| TBA | (China) Shengbo Sun |
| TBA | (Chinese Taipei) Pin-Chi Chien |
| TBA | (Vietnam) Ngo Nguyen Viet Tuan |
| TBA | (Japan) Koshi Kuhara |
