= 2017 Asia Talent Cup =

2017 Asia Talent Cup
Previous:	2016	Next:	2018

The 2017 Asia Talent Cup was the fourth season of the Asia Talent Cup (ATC), an international motorcycle racing series for young riders from Asia and Oceania. The season marked a significant transition for the championship, as Idemitsu replaced Shell as the title sponsor, officially renaming the competition the Idemitsu Asia Talent Cup.

== Season Summary ==
The 2017 championship consisted of twelve races held across six rounds. The first race of second round at the Losail International Circuit in Qatar was cancelled due to hazardous track conditions caused by heavy rain and a storm that occurred overnight. The season won by Turkish rider Deniz Öncü who secured the title following a season-long rivalry with his twin brother, Can Öncü, and Japanese rider Haruki Noguchi.

== Entry list ==
No.	Rider	Rounds
2	(Japan) Takuto Suzuki	All
3	(Turkey) Can Öncü	All
4	(Indonesia) Gerry Salim	All
5	(Japan) Yuki Kunii	All
6	(Indonesia) Irfan Ardiansyah	1–2, 5–6
7	(Turkey) Deniz Öncü	All
8	(Japan) Koji Hirama	All
9	(Japan) Haruki Noguchi	All
10	(Japan) Kai Saito	All
11	(Malaysia) Haziq Hamdan	All
12	(Japan) Ryusei Yamanaka	All
13	(Indonesia) Lucky Hendriansya	All
14	(Indonesia) Bima Febrinda Arfin	1–2, 4
15	(Thailand) Kritchaporn Kaewsonthi	All
16	(Australia) Reid Terrence Battye	1–4
17	(Japan) Maxi Hattori	1–3
18	(Japan) Kohki Suzuki	All
19	(Malaysia) Syairul Suhaimi	All
20	(Malaysia) Azroy Anuar	All
21	(Indonesia) Surya Surojo	1
22	(Indonesia) Riefsa Firdaus Hakim	1–2
23	(Philippines) Koko Masaharu Tadachi	1–4, 6
24	(Indonesia) Erfin Firmansyah	1–5

== Race calendar and results ==
Rnd.		Circuit	Date	Pole position	Winning rider
1	R1	(Thailand) Chang International Circuit	11 March	(Japan) Yuki Kunii	(Turkey) Deniz Öncü
1	R2	(Thailand) Chang International Circuit	12 March	(Japan) Yuki Kunii	(Turkey) Deniz Öncü
2	R1	(Qatar) Losail International Circuit	25 March	(Japan) Yuki Kunii	Race Cancelled
2	R2	(Qatar) Losail International Circuit	26 March	(Japan) Yuki Kunii	(Japan) Yuki Kunii
3	R1	(Japan) Suzuka Circuit	3 June	(Japan) Ryusei Yamanaka	(Japan) Haruki Noguchi
3	R2	(Japan) Suzuka Circuit	4 June	(Japan) Ryusei Yamanaka	(Japan) Yuki Kunii
4	R1	(Malaysia) Sepang International Circuit	29 July	(Turkey) Can Öncü	(Turkey) Can Öncü
4	R2	(Malaysia) Sepang International Circuit	30 July	(Turkey) Can Öncü	(Turkey) Can Öncü
5	R1	(Japan) Twin Ring Motegi	14 October	(Japan) Yuki Kunii	(Japan) Ryusei Yamanaka
5	R2	(Japan) Twin Ring Motegi	15 October	(Japan) Yuki Kunii	(Japan) Yuki Kunii
6	R1	(Malaysia) Sepang International Circuit	28 October	(Malaysia) Azroy Anuar	(Turkey) Can Öncü
6	R2	(Malaysia) Sepang International Circuit	29 October	(Malaysia) Azroy Anuar	(Turkey) Can Öncü

== Championship standings ==
Scoring system

Points were awarded to the top fifteen finishers. A rider had to finish the race to earn points.

Position	1st	2nd	3rd	4th	5th	6th	7th	8th	9th	10th	11th	12th	13th	14th	15th
Points	25	20	16	13	11	10	9	8	7	6	5	4	3	2	1

Pos.	Rider	THA (Thailand)		QAT (Qatar)		SUZ (Japan)		MAL1 (Malaysia)		JPN (Japan)		MAL2 (Malaysia)		Pts
Pos.	Rider	R1	R2	R1	R2	R1	R2	R1	R2	R1	R2	R1	R2	Pts
1	(Turkey) Deniz Öncü	1	1	C	5	Ret	5	6	2	3	3	7	4	156
2	(Japan) Haruki Noguchi	6	3	C	3	1	2	4	5	Ret	4	5	2	155
3	(Turkey) Can Öncü	7	4	C	4	5	15	1^{P}	1^{P}	Ret	Ret	1	1	147
4	(Japan) Ryusei Yamanaka	3	2	C	2	4^{P}	14^{P}	5	3	1	Ret	6	6	143
5	(Japan) Yuki Kunii	8^{P}	5^{P}	C	1^{P}	3	1	Ret	Ret	Ret^{P}	1^{P}	3	3	142
6	(Malaysia) Azroy Anuar	2	Ret	C	6	2	6	2	4	2	Ret	4^{P}	9^{P}	133
7	(Indonesia) Gerry Salim	5	6	C	8	Ret	Ret	3	6	Ret	5	2	8	94
8	(Japan) Genki Nakajima			C	Ret	7	3	8	Ret	5	2	8	7	81
9	(Japan) Koji Hirama	Ret	7	C	10	6	4	7	Ret	Ret	Ret	9	5	65
10	(Indonesia) Lucky Hendriansya	11	9	C	7	14	10	10	7	Ret	6	Ret	15	55
11	(Thailand) Kritchaporn Kaewsonthi	4	10	C	Ret	8	Ret	Ret	9	Ret	8	10	10	54
12	(Japan) Takuto Suzuki	10	13	C	Ret	13	11	9	11	7	10	13	11	52
13	(Japan) Kohki Suzuki	Ret	12	C	11	11	7	12	10	Ret	7	11	12	51
14	(Indonesia) Erfin Firmansyah	14	11	C	12	10	9	11	8	Ret	9			44
15	(Japan) Kai Saito	16	16	C	15	9	8	13	Ret	6	13	12	13	39
16	(Indonesia) Irfan Ardiansyah	9	8	C	9					4	Ret	17	16	35
17	(Malaysia) Syairul Suhaimi			C	Ret	17	17	Ret	14	8	11	15	17	16
18	(Malaysia) Haziq Hamdan	15	Ret	C	18	15	13	14	12	Ret	12	16	Ret	15
19	(Japan) Maxi Hattori	12	Ret	C	Ret	12	12							12
20	(Australia) Reid Terrence Battye	17	14	C	13	Ret	16	Ret	13					8
21	(Philippines) Koko Masaharu Tadachi	18	17	C	17	16	18	16	15			14	14	5
22	(Thailand) Thitivarak Passawit	13	15											4
23	(Indonesia) Riefsa Firdaus Hakim	19	18	C	14									2
24	(Indonesia) Bima Febrinda Arfin	20	19	C	16			15	Ret					1
25	(Indonesia) Surya Surojo	21	20											0
Pos.	Rider	R1	R2	R1	R2	R1	R2	R1	R2	R1	R2	R1	R2	Pts
Pos.	Rider	THA (Thailand)		QAT (Qatar)		SUZ (Japan)		MAL1 (Malaysia)		JPN (Japan)		MAL2 (Malaysia)		Pts

Colour	Result
Gold	Winner
Silver	Second place
Bronze	Third place
Green	Points classification
Blue	Non-points classification
Blue	Non-classified finish (NC)
Purple	Retired, not classified (Ret)
Red	Did not qualify (DNQ)
Red	Did not pre-qualify (DNPQ)
Black	Disqualified (DSQ)
White	Did not start (DNS)
White	Withdrew (WD)
White	Race cancelled (C)
Blank	Did not practice (DNP)
Blank	Did not arrive (DNA)
Blank	Excluded (EX)

P – Pole position
