= Shengbo Sun =

Chinese motorcycle racer (born 2012)

Shengbo Sun 孙圣博
- Born: 23 December 2012 (age 13); Changchun, Jilin, China
- Nationality: Chinese
- Current team: Aspar Team
- Bike number: 25

Championship titles
- ESBK Talent (2026)
Statistics
ESBK Talent
Active years	2026–
Championships	1
Manufacturer	Honda
Last season (2026)	1st (283 pts)
Starts / Wins / Podiums / Poles / F. laps / Points; 14 / 9 / 11 / 3 / 6 / 283

Shengbo Sun (Chinese: 孙圣博; pinyin: Sūn Shèngbó; born 23 December 2012), also known as Eddie Sun, is a Chinese motorcycle racer who competes in the ESBK Talent class of the Spanish Superbike Championship for Aspar Team. He is set to compete in the Moto4 Asia Cup in 2027.

Sun has been part of CFMoto's talent development program since 2023. He is the 2025 FIM MotoMini World Series and 2026 ESBK Talent champion.

== Career ==
=== Early career ===
Born in China, Sun's parents moved to Portugal when he was only two years old. Aged seven, he tried a 90cc minibike for the first time and quickly managed to run competitively, clinching Portugal's Velocidade Ohvale 110cc championship in 2020. He later relocated to Barcelona, Spain, where he continued to race with 110cc minibikes in the Catalan Ohvale 110cc championship.

In 2023, Sun transitioned to 160cc minibike racing, with the intention of reaching the FIM MiniGP World Series final held every year in November, and finished as runner-up in the Ohvale 160cc Catalan championship. Following his results in minibike racing, Chinese manufacturer CFMoto selected Sun for their talent program and began sponsoring him.

=== FIM MotoMini and Spanish Superbike Championship (2024–) ===
In 2024, Sun won Spain's FIM MiniGP 160cc championship and earned a spot in the 160cc class of the World Series final at MotorLand Aragon, where he finished in fifth place overall. For 2025, Sun entered the Moto4 class of the Spanish Superbike Championship with ETG Racing, debuting in full-sized tracks with the Honda NSF250R. He scored three podiums in the opening two rounds of the season at Jerez and Barcelona, and clinched his maiden win during the fourth round at Navarre. He ranked third overall at the end of the season.

That same year, Sun competed in the Spanish FIM MiniGP 190cc championship where he finished as runner-up, and earned a spot in the newly renamed MotoMini World Series final at Valencia, this time representing his native China in the 190cc class. Sun won two of the three main races and was crowned 2025 MotoMini World Series champion.

In 2026, Sun entered the new ESBK Talent class of the Spanish Superbike Championship with Aspar Team, as part of the CFMoto-Aspar development structure. Following a similar calendar from 2025, Sun dominated the first half of the season by winning seven of the initial eight races. After struggling in the Valencia round, Sun returned to the top spot of the podium at Navarre, where he was crowned ESBK Talent champion with one round remaining, beating rivals Kupczyński and Arnold.

=== Moto4 Asia Cup (2027–) ===
Sun was invited to the 2027 Moto4 Asia Cup selection event held in October 2026, where he was chosen to compete for 2027, alongside eight other selectees.

== Career statistics ==
=== FIM MotoMini World Series ===
(key) (Races in bold indicate pole position; races in italics indicate fastest lap)

Year	Class	Bike	1	2	3	Pos	Pts
2024	160cc	Ohvale	ARA; R1; 4	ARA; R2; 6	ARA; SFR; 5	5th	45
2025	190cc	Ohvale	**VAL**; **R1**; 1	**VAL**; **R2**; 2	**VAL**; **SFR**; 1	1st	78

=== Spanish Superbike Championship ===
==== Races by year ====
(key) (Races in bold indicate pole position; races in italics indicate fastest lap)

Year	Class	Bike	1		2		3		4		5		6		7		Pos	Pts
Year	Class	Bike	R1	R2	R1	R2	R1	R2	R1	R2	R1	R2	R1	R2	R1	R2	Pos	Pts
2025	Moto4	Honda	JER; 3	JER; 3	BAR; 3	BAR; 4	ARA; 6	ARA; 9	NAV; 2	NAV; 1	**NAV**; 4	**NAV**; 2	EST; 4	EST; Ret	**JER**; 4	**JER**; 5	3rd	193
2026	ESBK Talent	Honda	JER; 1	JER; 2	NAV; 1	NAV; 1	**EST**; 1	**EST**; 1	**ARA**; 1	**ARA**; 1	VAL; 9	VAL; 5	**NAV**; 1	**NAV**; 1	JER; 2	JER; Ret	1st	283
