= Syarifuddin Azman =

Malaysian motorcycle racer

- Nationality: Malaysian
- Born: 24 November 2001 (age 24); Puchong, Selangor, Malaysia
- Bike number: 63
Motorcycle racing career statistics
Moto3 World Championship
Active years	2021–2023
Manufacturers	Honda (2021–2022); KTM (2023)
2023 championship position	28th (5 pts)
Starts / Wins / Podiums / Poles / F. laps / Points; 21 / 0 / 0 / 0 / 0 / 8
Supersport World Championship
Active years	2025–
Manufacturers	Honda
Championships	0
2025 championship position	36th (0 pts)
Starts / Wins / Podiums / Poles / F. laps / Points; 18 / 0 / 0 / 0 / 0 / 0

Muhammad Syarifuddin bin Azman (born 24 November 2001) is a Malaysian motorcycle rider.

== Career ==
Syarifuddin made his European motorcycling racing debut in the 2019 FIM CEV Moto3 Junior World Championship, replacing compatriot Idil Mahadi for the final round of the season in Valencia, scoring no points. He would get a full-time seat for 2020 however, scoring points in five of the eleven races held that year, with a season's best of ninth, in Jerez. He finished 19th in the championship, with 18 total points.

=== Moto3 World Championship ===
The breakthrough season for Syarifuddin was 2021, being a regular scorer of points throughout the season, and even winning his first race in the junior category. He won the first race held in Barcelona that season, finishing in front of well established talented riders such as David Muñoz, José Antonio Rueda, and Daniel Holgado. Altogether, Syarifuddin finished the championship ninth in the standings, with 64 points. He got his chance to make his debut in Grand Prix racing as well in 2021, replacing John McPhee during the Aragon Grand Prix (McPhee served as a replacement in the Moto2 class for Jake Dixon, who in turn replaced the injured Franco Morbidelli in the MotoGP class, after he was injured).

In 2022, Syarifuddin again raced in the 2022 FIM JuniorGP World Championship, scoring three podiums throughout the season (all three second-place finishes), two in Barcelona, and one in Portimão. He finished fourth in the final standings. He also competed in three races in the 2022 Moto3 World Championship, replacing injured Alberto Surra in Portimão and Jerez, and rode as a wildcard rider in Barcelona, but scored no points. He would make another wildcard appearance in his home GP in Malaysia, and finished in 16th, just one place outside of the point scoring positions.

On 21 October 2022, during the 2022 Malaysian motorcycle Grand Prix, it was announced that Syarifuddin would ride full-time in the 2023 Moto3 World Championship, partnering Diogo Moreira at the MT Helmets-MSi Team.

==== MT Helmets – MSi (2023) ====
Syarifuddin competed for the MT Helmets - MSi Racing team in the 2023 Moto3 World Championship, but only scored five points all year, an 11th place in Argentina, and was not extended for another season.

== Career statistics ==
=== Asia Talent Cup ===
==== Races by year ====
(key) (Races in bold indicate pole position; races in italics indicate fastest lap)

Year	Bike	1	2	3	4	5	6	7	8	9	10	11	12	Pos	Pts
2018	Honda	QAT1; 14	QAT1; 11	THA1; 10	THA2; NC	MAL1; 7	MAL2; NC	CHA1; 3	CHA2; 2	JPN1; 3	JPN2; 4	SEP1; NC	SEP2; 1	6th	112
2020*	Honda	QAT1; 3	QAT1; 1	AUS1; C	AUS2; C	MAL1; C	MAL2; C	CHA1; C	CHA2; C	JPN1; C	JPN2; C	SEP1; C	SEP2; C	2nd	41

The 2020 Asia Talent Cup championship was not counted.

=== European Talent Cup ===
==== Races by year ====
(key) (Races in bold indicate pole position; races in italics indicate fastest lap)

Year	Bike	1	2	3	4	5	6	7	8	9	10	11	Pts	Pos
2019	Honda	EST; 5	EST; 11	VAL	VAL	CAT	ARA; 12	ARA; 11	JER; 13	JER	ALB; 14	VAL	16th	30

=== FIM CEV Moto3 Junior World Championship ===
==== Races by year ====
(key) (Races in bold indicate pole position, races in italics indicate fastest lap)

Year	Bike	1	2	3	4	5	6	7	8	9	10	11	12	Pos	Pts
2019	Honda	EST	VAL1	VAL2	FRA	CAT1	CAT2	ARA	JER1	JER2	ALB	VAL1; 23	VAL2; Ret	NC	0
2020	Honda	EST; Ret	POR; 14	JER1; 9	JER2; 13	JER3; 15	ARA1; 18	ARA2; 23	ARA3; 20	VAL1; 11	VAL2; 16	VAL3; Ret		19th	18
2021	Honda	EST; 13	VAL1; 12	VAL2; 19	CAT1; 1	CAT2; Ret	POR; 8	ARA; 16	JER1; Ret	JER2; 12	RSM; 15	VAL3; 6	VAL4; 7	9th	64

=== FIM JuniorGP World Championship ===
==== Races by year ====
(key) (Races in bold indicate pole position) (Races in italics indicate fastest lap)

Year	Bike	1	2		3		4		5	6	7	8		Pos	Pts
Year	Bike	R1	R1	R2	R1	R2	R1	R2	R1	R1	R1	R1	R2	Pos	Pts
2022	Honda	EST; Ret	VAL; 7	VAL; 4	CAT; 2	CAT; 2	JER; 4	JER; 14	POR; 2	SMR; 6	ARA; 13	VAL; Ret	VAL; 9	4th	117

=== Grand Prix motorcycle racing ===
==== By season ====
Season	Class	Motorcycle	Team	Race	Win	Podium	Pole	FLap	Pts	Plcd
2021	Moto3	Honda	Sepang Racing Team	1	0	0	0	0	3	30th
2022	Moto3	Honda	Rivacold Snipers Team; VisionTrack Racing Team	4	0	0	0	0	0	28th
2023	Moto3	KTM	MT Helmets – MSI	16	0	0	0	0	5	28th
Total				**21**	**0**	**0**	**0**	**0**	**8**	

==== By class ====
Class	Seasons	1st GP	1st pod	1st win	Race	Win	Podiums	Pole	FLap	Pts	WChmp
Moto3	2021–2023	2021 Aragon			21	0	0	0	0	8	0
Total	2021–2023				**21**	**0**	**0**	**0**	**0**	**8**	**0**

==== Races by year ====
(key) (Races in bold indicate pole position, races in italics indicate fastest lap)

Year	Class	Bike	1	2	3	4	5	6	7	8	9	10	11	12	13	14	15	16	17	18	19	20	Pos	Pts
2021	Moto3	Honda	QAT	DOH	POR	SPA	FRA	ITA	CAT	GER	NED	STY	AUT	GBR	ARA; 13	RSM	AME	EMI	ALR	VAL			30th	3
2022	Moto3	Honda	QAT	INA	ARG	AME	POR; 24	SPA; 22	FRA	ITA	CAT; 19	GER	NED	GBR	AUT	RSM	ARA	JPN	THA	AUS	MAL; 16	VAL	28th	0
2023	Moto3	KTM	POR; 22	ARG; 11	AME; Ret	SPA; 21	FRA; Ret	ITA; DNS	GER	NED; DNS	GBR; Ret	AUT; 28	CAT; 24	RSM; 25	IND; 21	JPN; 19	INA; 24	AUS; Ret	THA; 24	MAL; 20	QAT; 22	VAL; DNS	28th	5

=== Asia Production 250 ===
==== Races by year ====
(key) (Races in bold indicate pole position, races in italics indicate fastest lap)

Year	Bike	1		2		3		4		5		6		Pos	Pts
Year	Bike	R1	R2	R1	R2	R1	R2	R1	R2	R1	R2	R1	R2	Pos	Pts
2024	Honda	CHA; 4	CHA; 3	ZHU; 4	ZHU; C	MOT; 5	MOT; 6	MAN; 8	MAN; 11	SEP; 3	SEP; 8	CHA; 8	CHA; 7	6th	117

=== ARRC Supersports 600 Championship ===
==== Races by year ====
(key) (Races in bold indicate pole position; races in italics indicate fastest lap)

Year	Bike	1		2		3		4		5		6		Pos	Pts
Year	Bike	R1	R2	R1	R2	R1	R2	R1	R2	R1	R2	R1	R2	Pos	Pts
2025	Honda	**CHA**; 6	**CHA**; 9	SEP; 7	SEP; 4	MOT; Ret	MOT; 9	MAN; Ret	MAN; 7	SEP; 1	SEP; 1	CHA; 10	CHA; 11	7th	113

* Season still in progress.

=== Supersport World Championship ===
==== Races by year ====
(key) (Races in bold indicate pole position; races in italics indicate fastest lap)

Year	Bike	1		2		3		4		5		6		7		8		9		10		11		12		Pos	Pts
Year	Bike	R1	R2	R1	R2	R1	R2	R1	R2	R1	R2	R1	R2	R1	R2	R1	R2	R1	R2	R1	R2	R1	R2	R1	R2	Pos	Pts
2025	Honda	AUS; 17	AUS; 19	POR; Ret	POR; 25	NED; DNS	NED; DNS	ITA; 26	ITA; Ret	CZE; 24	CZE; 27	EMI; 29	EMI; 23	GBR	GBR	HUN; 21	HUN; 21	FRA; 21	FRA; 25	ARA; 26	ARA; 22	POR	POR	SPA; 27	SPA; 23	36th	0
