= Afridza Munandar =

Indonesian motorcycle rider (1999–2019)

- Nationality: Indonesian
- Born: August 13, 1999; Tasikmalaya, West Java, Indonesia
- Died: November 2, 2019 (aged 20); Kuala Lumpur, Malaysia
- Bike number: 4 (retired in honour)

Afridza Syach Munandar (August 13, 1999 – November 2, 2019) was an Indonesian motorcycle racer. He was known to excel in national and Asian racing events. He was one of the most striking riders in the 2019 Indonesian Oneprix Motoprix National Championship by defending the Yogyakarta Astra Motor Racing Team (ART).

== Career ==
Munandar began to pursue motorbike racing since he was 6–8 years old. Munandar also participated in mini motor racing and Munandar began to pursue the world of motor racing since middle school. Previously, he was introduced to motocross by his late grandfather, Andi Suryana, who was a former motorcycle racer from Tasikmalaya. He won the MP 5 and MP 6 West Java championships in 2013. He strengthened the West Java team in the PON XIX motorcycle racing branch. Competing with Andi Farid Izdihar, and Adly M. Taufik, he presented a silver medal in the team number A underbone at the Bukit Peusar circuit. In the 2017 season, he won the MP 3 and MP 4 region 2.

In 2018, Munandar competed in the Asia Talent Cup, the 3rd podium at the Chang International Circuit in Thailand.

With the start of 2019 One Prix, Munander competed in the Four-stroke motorcycle Tune-Up Injection Expert 150cc class for the ART Yogyakarta team. He won three wins in total respectively in race 1 round 1, race 1 round 2 (both of which were held at the Bukit Peusar circuit), and race 1 round 3 at the Sentul Karting circuit. In addition, Munandar stayed in the Asia Talent Cup for the 2019 season. He won the race in Buriram, and the Sepang International Circuit round 3.

== Death ==
Munandar died on November 2, 2019, due to a fatal accident while racing in the Asia Talent Cup at the Sepang International Circuit, Malaysia. In the final standings, he is ranked 3rd with 142 points. The world's motorcyclists shared their condolences for his death, including Maverick Viñales, who presented his victory at the 2019 Sepang MotoGP dedicated for him, Ai Ogura gives Munandar's helmet dedicated for him after the Moto3 race and Alex Márquez, who presented Moto2 world title dedicated for him. As a part of respect, the organizers of the Asia Talent Cup decided that number 4, which was the starting number for Munandar, should be retired and no longer allowed to be used by other riders.

Munandar's death was the second time a fatal accident occurred as Marco Simoncelli died in what was a similar incident at the 2011 Malaysian Grand Prix, eight years previously.

== Career statistics ==
=== Asia Talent Cup ===
==== Races by year ====
(key) (Races in bold indicate pole position; races in italics indicate fastest lap)

Year	Bike	1	2	3	4	5	6	7	8	9	10	11	12	Pos	Pts
2019	Honda	QAT1; Ret	QAT1; 5	THA1; 1	THA2; 3	MAL1; 2	MAL2; 1	CHA1; Ret	CHA2; 3	JPN1; 2	JPN2; 7	SEP1; C	SEP2	3rd	142
