= Taiyo Furusato =

Japanese motorcycle racer (born 2005)

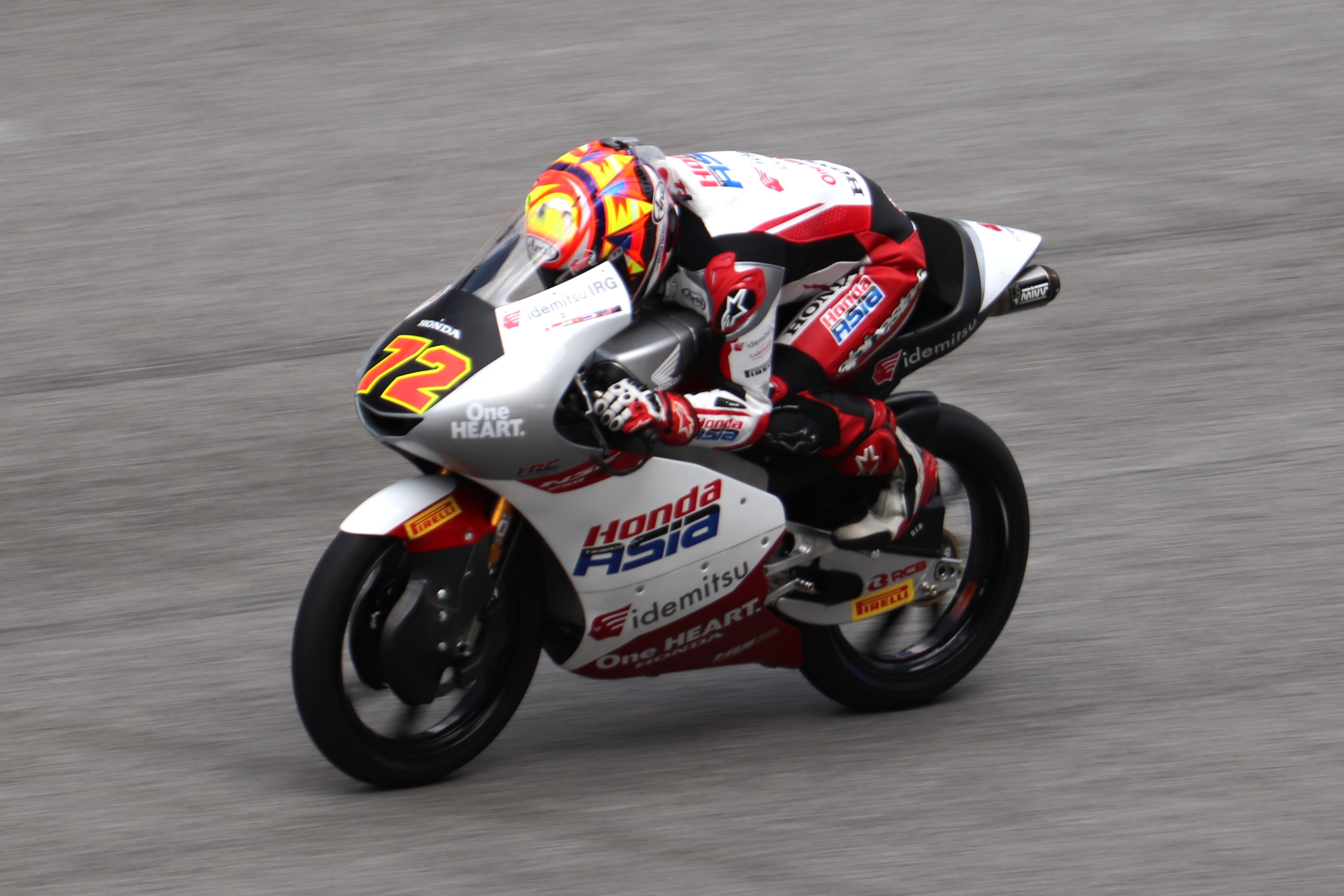
- Furusato at the 2024 Malaysian Grand Prix
- Nationality: Japanese
- Born: 12 July 2005 (age 21); Kanoya, Kagoshima, Japan
- Current team: Idemitsu Honda Team Asia
- Bike number: 72
Motorcycle racing career statistics
Moto2 World Championship
| Active years | 2026– |
| Manufacturers | Kalex |
Starts / Wins / Podiums / Poles / F. laps / Points; 19 / 0 / 0 / 0 / 0 / 17
Moto3 World Championship
| Active years | 2022–2025 |
| Manufacturers | Honda |
| 2025 championship position | 8th (172 pts) |
Starts / Wins / Podiums / Poles / F. laps / Points; 79 / 1 / 9 / 1 / 3 / 374

Taiyo Furusato (Japanese: 古里 太陽, Hepburn: Furusato Taiyō; born 12 July 2005) is a Japanese Grand Prix motorcycle racer who competes for Honda Team Asia in the Moto2 World Championship. He is the 2021 Asia Talent Cup champion.

== Career ==
=== Early career ===
Furusato was born in Kanoya, Japan. He performed well in national junior categories and was selected to compete in the 2020 Asia Talent Cup season. He finished second in his debut race, but the championship was cancelled after just one round in Qatar due to the COVID-19 pandemic.

The cup returned for the 2021 season in which Furusato won every round on the calendar, and consequently the championship. A feat that, as of now, no other rider has been able to replicate.

That same year, Furusato was given a mid-season opportunity to replace an injured rider in the 2021 Red Bull MotoGP Rookies Cup. He went on to win his debut race in Mugello, his first time riding a KTM bike and competing on that track. He finished the season in 11th place. These results granted him a seat in the 2022 Moto3 World Championship with HRC's Honda Team Asia, where he was partnered with Mario Aji.

=== Moto3 World Championship ===
==== Honda Team Asia (2022–2025) ====
Furusato had a difficult start to the World Championship after suffering a foot injury during pre-season testing in Jerez, which made him sit out the first two rounds in Qatar and Indonesia. He struggled in his debut season, scoring points only in his home race at Motegi, where he finished in 14th place.

In 2023, Furusato progressed positively, consistently scoring points in the second half of the season, with several top-ten finishes, including a maiden podium for his standout second-place finish in Thailand. He ended the season in 16th place in the championship standings.

Furusato's 2024 Moto3 season began with a podium finish in Qatar, narrowly trailing David Alonso and Daniel Holgado in a tight battle to the line. Furusato clinched two more podiums during the season, both second-place finishes in Germany and Malaysia, respectively. He finished tenth in the final standings and was confirmed to remain in Moto3 for a fourth season, alongside Tatchakorn Buasri.

=== Moto2 World Championship ===
==== Honda Team Asia (2026) ====
In October 2025, Honda announced Furusato would step up to the 2026 Moto2 World Championship, alongside Mario Aji, after four full-seasons in the lightweight class.

== Career statistics ==
=== Asia Talent Cup ===
==== Races by year ====
(key) (Races in bold indicate pole position; races in italics indicate fastest lap)

| Year | Bike | 1 | | 2 | | 3 | | 4 | | Pos | Pts |
| Year | Bike | R1 | R2 | R1 | R2 | R1 | R2 | R1 | R2 | Pos | Pts |
|---|---|---|---|---|---|---|---|---|---|---|---|
| 2021 | Honda | **QAT**; 1 | **QAT**; 1 | **DOH**; 1 | **DOH**; 1 | INA; 1 | INA; 1 | MAN; 1 | MAN; C | 1st | 175 |

=== Red Bull MotoGP Rookies Cup ===
==== Races by year ====
(key) (Races in bold indicate pole position, races in italics indicate fastest lap)

| Year | Bike | 1 | | 2 | | 3 | | 4 | | 5 | | 6 | | 7 | | Pos | Pts |
| Year | Bike | R1 | R2 | R1 | R2 | R1 | R2 | R1 | R2 | R1 | R2 | R1 | R2 | R1 | R2 | Pos | Pts |
|---|---|---|---|---|---|---|---|---|---|---|---|---|---|---|---|---|---|
| 2021 | KTM | POR | POR | SPA | SPA | MUG; 1 | MUG; 14 | GER; Ret | GER; Ret | RBR; 10 | RBR; 8 | RBR; 5 | RBR; 4 | ARA; 7 | ARA; Ret | 11th | 74 |

=== Grand Prix motorcycle racing ===
==== By season ====
| Season | Class | Motorcycle | Team | Race | Win | Podium | Pole | FLap | Pts | Plcd |
|---|---|---|---|---|---|---|---|---|---|---|
| 2022 | Moto3 | Honda | Honda Team Asia | 18 | 0 | 0 | 0 | 0 | 2 | 27th |
| 2023 | Moto3 | Honda | Honda Team Asia | 20 | 0 | 1 | 0 | 0 | 63 | 16th |
| 2024 | Moto3 | Honda | Honda Team Asia | 19 | 0 | 3 | 1 | 0 | 137 | 10th |
| 2025 | Moto3 | Honda | Honda Team Asia | 22 | 1 | 5 | 0 | 3 | 172 | 8th |
| 2026 | Moto2 | Honda | Idemitsu Honda Team Asia | 19 | 0 | 0 | 0 | 0 | 17* | 24th* |
| Total | | | | **98** | **1** | **9** | **1** | **3** | **391** | |

==== By class ====
| Class | Seasons | 1st GP | 1st pod | 1st win | Race | Win | Podiums | Pole | FLap | Pts | WChmp |
|---|---|---|---|---|---|---|---|---|---|---|---|
| Moto3 | 2022–2025 | 2022 Argentina | 2023 Thailand | 2025 Malaysian | 79 | 1 | 9 | 1 | 3 | 374 | 0 |
| Moto2 | 2026–present | 2026 Thailand | | | 19 | 0 | 0 | 0 | 0 | 17 | 0 |
| Total | 2022–present | | | | **98** | **1** | **9** | **1** | **3** | **391** | **0** |

==== Races by year ====
(key) (Races in bold indicate pole position; races in italics indicate fastest lap)

| Year | Class | Bike | 1 | 2 | 3 | 4 | 5 | 6 | 7 | 8 | 9 | 10 | 11 | 12 | 13 | 14 | 15 | 16 | 17 | 18 | 19 | 20 | 21 | 22 | Pos | Pts |
|---|---|---|---|---|---|---|---|---|---|---|---|---|---|---|---|---|---|---|---|---|---|---|---|---|---|---|
| 2022 | Moto3 | Honda | QAT | INA | ARG; 17 | AME; 16 | POR; 25 | SPA; 21 | FRA; 25 | ITA; 18 | CAT; Ret | GER; 17 | NED; 21 | GBR; 18 | AUT; 25 | RSM; 21 | ARA; 17 | JPN; 14 | THA; 25 | AUS; Ret | MAL; Ret | VAL; Ret | | | 27th | 2 |
| 2023 | Moto3 | Honda | POR; 21 | ARG; 18 | AME; 20 | SPA; 16 | FRA; Ret | ITA; Ret | GER; 10 | NED; 17 | GBR; 20 | AUT; 18 | CAT; 13 | RSM; 11 | IND; Ret | JPN; 12 | INA; 7 | AUS; 7 | THA; 2 | MAL; Ret | QAT; 14 | VAL; 11 | | | 16th | 63 |
| 2024 | Moto3 | Honda | QAT; 3 | POR; 18 | AME; Ret | SPA; 17 | FRA; 14 | CAT; Ret | ITA; 4 | NED; 13 | GER; 2 | GBR | AUT; 15 | ARA; 6 | RSM; 4 | **EMI**; 13 | INA; Ret | JPN; 9 | AUS; 7 | THA; 5 | MAL; 2 | SLD; 7 | | | 10th | 137 |
| 2025 | Moto3 | Honda | THA; Ret | ARG; 5 | AME; 9 | QAT; 2 | SPA; 6 | FRA; 6 | GBR; 12 | ARA; 11 | ITA; 6 | NED; Ret | GER; Ret | CZE; 16 | AUT; 6 | HUN; Ret | CAT; 3 | RSM; 12 | JPN; Ret | INA; Ret | AUS; 8 | MAL; 1 | POR; 3 | VAL; 3 | 8th | 172 |
| 2026 | Moto2 | Kalex | THA; 16 | BRA; Ret | USA; 18 | SPA; Ret | FRA; 22 | CAT; 20 | ITA; Ret | HUN; 14 | CZE; 14 | NED; 18 | GER; 5 | GBR; 23 | ARA; 19 | RSM; 17 | AUT; 18 | JPN; Ret | INA; 14 | AUS; C | MAL; Ret | QAT; Ret | POR | VAL | 24th* | 17* |

* Season still in progress.
