= 2023 Thailand motorcycle Grand Prix =

Motorcycle races in Buriram

2023 Thailand Grand Prix
Race details
- Race 17 of 20 races in the 2023 Grand Prix motorcycle racing season
- Date: 29 October 2023
- Official name: OR Thailand Grand Prix
- Location: Chang International Circuit; Buriram, Thailand
- Course: Permanent racing facility; 4.554 km (2.830 mi)

MotoGP
Pole position
Rider	(Spain) Jorge Martín	Ducati
Time	1:29.287	
Fastest lap
Rider	(Italy) Marco Bezzecchi	Ducati
Time	1:30.896 on lap 9	
Podium
First	(Spain) Jorge Martín	Ducati
Second	(Italy) Francesco Bagnaia	Ducati
Third	(South Africa) Brad Binder	KTM

Moto2
Pole position
Rider	(Spain) Fermín Aldeguer	Boscoscuro
Time	1:35.371	
Fastest lap
Rider	(Spain) Fermín Aldeguer	Boscoscuro
Time	1:35.778 on lap 2	
Podium
First	(Spain) Fermín Aldeguer	Boscoscuro
Second	(Spain) Pedro Acosta	Kalex
Third	(Thailand) Somkiat Chantra	Kalex

Moto3
Pole position
Rider	(Turkey) Deniz Öncü	KTM
Time	1:42.061	
Fastest lap
Rider	(Turkey) Deniz Öncü	KTM
Time	1:42.346 on lap 10	
Podium
First	(Colombia) David Alonso	Gas Gas
Second	(Japan) Taiyo Furusato	Honda
Third	(Netherlands) Collin Veijer	Husqvarna

The 2023 Thailand motorcycle Grand Prix (officially known as the OR Thailand Grand Prix) was the seventeenth round of the 2023 Grand Prix motorcycle racing season. It was held at the Chang International Circuit in Buriram on 29 October 2023.

== Practice session ==
=== MotoGP ===
==== Combined Free Practice 1-2 ====
Free Practice sessions on Friday and Saturday do not determine riders to qualify for Q2.

Fastest session lap

Pos.	No.	Biker	Constructor	Free practice times	
Pos.	No.	Biker	Constructor	FP1	FP2
1	89	(Spain) Jorge Martín	Ducati	**1:30.520**	1:30.809
2	12	(Spain) Maverick Viñales	Aprilia	1:30.758	**1:30.550**
3	41	(Spain) Aleix Espargaró	Aprilia	1:31.171	**1:30.591**
4	1	(Italy) Francesco Bagnaia	Ducati	1:31.507	**1:30.598**
5	20	(France) Fabio Quartararo	Yamaha	1:31.650	**1:30.617**
6	88	(Portugal) Miguel Oliveira	Aprilia	1:32.121	**1:30.660**
7	72	(Italy) Marco Bezzecchi	Ducati	1:31.824	**1:30.764**
8	5	(France) Johann Zarco	Ducati	1:31.913	**1:30.795**
9	49	(Italy) Fabio Di Giannantonio	Ducati	1:31.482	**1:30.817**
10	73	(Spain) Álex Márquez	Ducati	1:31.486	**1:30.822**
11	33	(South Africa) Brad Binder	KTM	1:31.755	**1:30.964**
12	44	(Spain) Pol Espargaró	KTM	1:31.012	**1:30.966**
13	43	(Australia) Jack Miller	KTM	1:31.682	**1:30.996**
14	93	(Spain) Marc Márquez	Honda	1:31.857	**1:31.008**
15	10	(Italy) Luca Marini	Ducati	1:31.789	**1:31.023**
16	25	(Spain) Raúl Fernández	Aprilia	1:31.482	**1:31.175**
17	21	(Italy) Franco Morbidelli	Yamaha	1:31.270	**1:31.216**
18	30	(Japan) Takaaki Nakagami	Honda	1:31.599	**1:31.231**
19	36	(Spain) Joan Mir	Honda	1:31.997	**1:31.282**
20	37	(Spain) Augusto Fernández	KTM	1:31.343	**1:31.342**
21	23	(Italy) Enea Bastianini	Ducati	1:31.853	**1:31.391**
OFFICIAL MOTOGP COMBINED FREE PRACTICE TIMES REPORT

==== Practice ====
The top ten riders (written in bold) qualified for Q2.

Pos.	No.	Biker	Constructor	
Pos.	No.	Biker	Constructor	Time results
1	89	**(Spain) Jorge Martín**	**Ducati**	**1:29.826**
2	12	**(Spain) Maverick Viñales**	**Aprilia**	**1:29.924**
3	41	**(Spain) Aleix Espargaró**	**Aprilia**	**1:29.986**
4	5	**(France) Johann Zarco**	**Ducati**	**1:30.006**
5	10	**(Italy) Luca Marini**	**Ducati**	**1:30.025**
6	72	**(Italy) Marco Bezzecchi**	**Ducati**	**1:30.034**
7	1	**(Italy) Francesco Bagnaia**	**Ducati**	**1:30.069**
8	20	**(France) Fabio Quartararo**	**Yamaha**	**1:30.074**
9	33	**(South Africa) Brad Binder**	**KTM**	**1:30.121**
10	37	**(Spain) Augusto Fernández**	**KTM**	**1:30.130**
11	93	(Spain) Marc Márquez	Honda	1:30.195
12	21	(Italy) Franco Morbidelli	Yamaha	1:30.217
13	43	(Australia) Jack Miller	KTM	1:30.224
14	49	(Italy) Fabio Di Giannantonio	Ducati	1:30.262
15	44	(Spain) Pol Espargaró	KTM	1:30.268
16	36	(Spain) Joan Mir	Honda	1:30.295
17	25	(Spain) Raúl Fernández	Aprilia	1:30.343
18	73	(Spain) Álex Márquez	Ducati	1:30.367
19	23	(Italy) Enea Bastianini	Ducati	1:30.915
20	30	(Japan) Takaaki Nakagami	Honda	1:30.990
21	88	(Portugal) Miguel Oliveira	Aprilia	1:31.104
OFFICIAL MOTOGP PRACTICE TIMES REPORT

== Qualifying ==
=== MotoGP ===
Fastest session lap

Pos.	No.	Biker	Constructor	Qualifying times		Final grid	Row
Pos.	No.	Biker	Constructor	Q1	Q2	Final grid	Row
1	89	(Spain) Jorge Martín	Ducati	Qualified in Q2	1:29.287	1	1
2	10	(Italy) Luca Marini	Ducati	Qualified in Q2	1:29.425	2	1
3	41	(Spain) Aleix Espargaró	Aprilia	Qualified in Q2	1:29.461	3	1
4	72	(Italy) Marco Bezzecchi	Ducati	Qualified in Q2	1:29.483	4	2
5	33	(South Africa) Brad Binder	KTM	Qualified in Q2	1:29.496	5	2
6	1	(Italy) Francesco Bagnaia	Ducati	Qualified in Q2	1:29.527	6	2
7	73	(Spain) Álex Márquez	Ducati	1:29.743	1:29.600	7	3
8	93	(Spain) Marc Márquez	Honda	1:29.830	1:29.622	8	3
9	12	(Spain) Maverick Viñales	Aprilia	Qualified in Q2	1:29.701	9	3
10	20	(France) Fabio Quartararo	Yamaha	Qualified in Q2	1:29.707	10	4
11	5	(France) Johann Zarco	Ducati	Qualified in Q2	1:29.923	11	4
12	37	(Spain) Augusto Fernández	KTM	Qualified in Q2	1:30.077	12	4
13	49	(Italy) Fabio Di Giannantonio	Ducati	1:29.850	N/A	13	5
14	25	(Spain) Raúl Fernández	Aprilia	1:29.914	N/A	14	5
15	43	(Australia) Jack Miller	KTM	1:30.096	N/A	15	5
16	30	(Japan) Takaaki Nakagami	Honda	1:30.115	N/A	16	6
17	44	(Spain) Pol Espargaró	KTM	1:30.124	N/A	17	6
18	21	(Italy) Franco Morbidelli	Yamaha	1:30.158	N/A	18	6
19	36	(Spain) Joan Mir	Honda	1:30.263	N/A	19	7
20	88	(Portugal) Miguel Oliveira	Aprilia	1:30.442	N/A	20	7
21	23	(Italy) Enea Bastianini	Ducati	1:30.677	N/A	21	7
OFFICIAL MOTOGP QUALIFYING RESULTS

== MotoGP Sprint ==
The MotoGP Sprint was held on 28 October.

Pos.	No.	Rider	Team	Constructor	Laps	Time/Retired	Grid	Points
1	89	(Spain) Jorge Martín	Prima Pramac Racing	Ducati	13	19:41.593	1	12
2	33	(South Africa) Brad Binder	Red Bull KTM Factory Racing	KTM	13	+0.933	5	9
3	10	(Italy) Luca Marini	Mooney VR46 Racing Team	Ducati	13	+1.841	2	7
4	93	(Spain) Marc Márquez	Repsol Honda Team	Honda	13	+3.503	8	6
5	41	(Spain) Aleix Espargaró	Aprilia Racing	Aprilia	13	+3.581	3	5
6	72	(Italy) Marco Bezzecchi	Mooney VR46 Racing Team	Ducati	13	+4.029	4	4
7	1	(Italy) Francesco Bagnaia	Ducati Lenovo Team	Ducati	13	+4.121	6	3
8	73	(Spain) Álex Márquez	Gresini Racing MotoGP	Ducati	13	+6.727	7	2
9	5	(France) Johann Zarco	Prima Pramac Racing	Ducati	13	+7.323	11	1
10	43	(Australia) Jack Miller	Red Bull KTM Factory Racing	KTM	13	+9.240	15	
11	20	(France) Fabio Quartararo	Monster Energy Yamaha MotoGP	Yamaha	13	+9.339	10	
12	36	(Spain) Joan Mir	Repsol Honda Team	Honda	13	+10.356	19	
13	23	(Italy) Enea Bastianini	Ducati Lenovo Team	Ducati	13	+12.312	21	
14	25	(Spain) Raúl Fernández	CryptoData RNF MotoGP Team	Aprilia	13	+15.390	14	
15	21	(Italy) Franco Morbidelli	Monster Energy Yamaha MotoGP	Yamaha	13	+15.535	18	
16	44	(Spain) Pol Espargaró	GasGas Factory Racing Tech3	KTM	13	+15.644	17	
17	88	(Portugal) Miguel Oliveira	CryptoData RNF MotoGP Team	Aprilia	13	+17.753	20	
18	12	(Spain) Maverick Viñales	Aprilia Racing	Aprilia	13	+22.675	9	
19	30	(Japan) Takaaki Nakagami	LCR Honda Idemitsu	Honda	13	+37.854	16	
Ret	49	(Italy) Fabio Di Giannantonio	Gresini Racing MotoGP	Ducati	9	Retired	13	
Ret	37	(Spain) Augusto Fernández	GasGas Factory Racing Tech3	KTM	5	Accident	12	
Fastest sprint lap: (Spain) Jorge Martín (Ducati) – 1:30.178 (lap 4)
OFFICIAL MOTOGP SPRINT REPORT

== Warm up practice ==
=== MotoGP ===
Fabio Quartararo set the best time 1:30.257 and was the fastest rider at this session ahead of Francesco Bagnaia and Franco Morbidelli.

== Race ==
=== MotoGP ===
Pos.	No.	Rider	Team	Constructor	Laps	Time/Retired	Grid	Points
1	89	(Spain) Jorge Martín	Prima Pramac Racing	Ducati	26	39:40.045	1	25
2	1	(Italy) Francesco Bagnaia	Ducati Lenovo Team	Ducati	26	+0.253	6	20
3 (Note: One-position penalty for exceeding track limits on the last lap.)	33	(South Africa) Brad Binder	Red Bull KTM Factory Racing	KTM	26	+0.114	5	16
4	72	(Italy) Marco Bezzecchi	Mooney VR46 Racing Team	Ducati	26	+2.005	4	13
5	20	(France) Fabio Quartararo	Monster Energy Yamaha MotoGP	Yamaha	26	+4.550	10	11
6	93	(Spain) Marc Márquez	Repsol Honda Team	Honda	26	+5.362	8	10
7	10	(Italy) Luca Marini	Mooney VR46 Racing Team	Ducati	26	+6.778	2	9
8	41	(Spain) Aleix Espargaró	Aprilia Racing	Aprilia	26	+7.303 (Note: Three-second penalty for spending more than half of the race distance under the minimum tyre pressure.)	3	8
9	49	(Italy) Fabio Di Giannantonio	Gresini Racing MotoGP	Ducati	26	+7.569	13	7
10	5	(France) Johann Zarco	Prima Pramac Racing	Ducati	26	+9.377	11	6
11	21	(Italy) Franco Morbidelli	Monster Energy Yamaha MotoGP	Yamaha	26	+11.168	18	5
12	36	(Spain) Joan Mir	Repsol Honda Team	Honda	26	+11.990	19	4
13	23	(Italy) Enea Bastianini	Ducati Lenovo Team	Ducati	26	+12.323	21	3
14	30	(Japan) Takaaki Nakagami	LCR Honda Idemitsu	Honda	26	+14.537	16	2
15	25	(Spain) Raúl Fernández	CryptoData RNF MotoGP Team	Aprilia	26	+15.093	14	1
16	43	(Australia) Jack Miller	Red Bull KTM Factory Racing	KTM	26	+17.640	15	
17	37	(Spain) Augusto Fernández	GasGas Factory Racing Tech3	KTM	26	+21.307	12	
18	44	(Spain) Pol Espargaró	GasGas Factory Racing Tech3	KTM	26	+21.435	17	
Ret	12	(Spain) Maverick Viñales	Aprilia Racing	Aprilia	23	Retired	9	
Ret	73	(Spain) Álex Márquez	Gresini Racing MotoGP	Ducati	12	Accident	7	
Ret	88	(Portugal) Miguel Oliveira	CryptoData RNF MotoGP Team	Aprilia	6	Technical issue	20	
Fastest lap: (Italy) Marco Bezzecchi (Ducati) – 1:30.896 (lap 9)
OFFICIAL MOTOGP RACE REPORT

=== Moto2 ===
Pos.	No.	Rider	Constructor	Laps	Time/Retired	Grid	Points
1	54	(Spain) Fermín Aldeguer	Boscoscuro	22	35:20.880	1	25
2	37	(Spain) Pedro Acosta	Kalex	22	+3.481	2	20
3	35	(Thailand) Somkiat Chantra	Kalex	22	+9.794	5	16
4	14	(Italy) Tony Arbolino	Kalex	22	+12.923	8	13
5	79	(Japan) Ai Ogura	Kalex	22	+14.451	19	11
6	24	(Spain) Marcos Ramírez	Kalex	22	+14.816	6	10
7	75	(Spain) Albert Arenas	Kalex	22	+15.030	3	9
8	21	(Spain) Alonso López	Boscoscuro	22	+18.360	7	8
9	28	(Spain) Izan Guevara	Kalex	22	+19.798	17	7
10	18	(Spain) Manuel González	Kalex	22	+20.564	20	6
11	40	(Spain) Arón Canet	Kalex	22	+20.962	4	5
12	71	(Italy) Dennis Foggia	Kalex	22	+24.198	16	4
13	52	(Spain) Jeremy Alcoba	Kalex	22	+25.593	13	3
14	22	(United Kingdom) Sam Lowes	Kalex	22	+26.526	14	2
15	15	(South Africa) Darryn Binder	Kalex	22	+33.565	25	1
16	64	(Netherlands) Bo Bendsneyder	Kalex	22	+33.716	21	
17	12	(Czech Republic) Filip Salač	Kalex	22	+33.734	18	
18	7	(Belgium) Barry Baltus	Kalex	22	+35.157	22	
19	17	(Spain) Álex Escrig	Forward	22	+37.586	23	
20	33	(United Kingdom) Rory Skinner	Kalex	22	+42.531	30	
21	9	(Italy) Mattia Casadei	Kalex	22	+55.552	28	
22	5	(Japan) Kohta Nozane	Kalex	22	+1:04.820	29	
23	3	(Germany) Lukas Tulovic	Kalex	22	+1:27.793	26	
Ret	84	(Netherlands) Zonta van den Goorbergh	Kalex	18	Technical issue	15	
Ret	11	(Spain) Sergio García	Kalex	7	Accident	11	
Ret	13	(Italy) Celestino Vietti	Kalex	4	Accident	12	
Ret	96	(United Kingdom) Jake Dixon	Kalex	4	Collision	9	
Ret	16	(United States) Joe Roberts	Kalex	2	Accident	10	
Ret	23	(Japan) Taiga Hada	Kalex	2	Accident	24	
Ret	67	(Italy) Alberto Surra	Forward	0	Accident	27	
Fastest lap: (Spain) Fermín Aldeguer (Boscoscuro) – 1:35.778 (lap 2)
OFFICIAL MOTO2 RACE REPORT

=== Moto3 ===
Pos.	No.	Rider	Constructor	Laps	Time/Retired	Grid	Points
1	80	(Colombia) David Alonso	Gas Gas	19	32:45.307	12	25
2	72	(Japan) Taiyo Furusato	Honda	19	+0.266	6	20
3	95	(Netherlands) Collin Veijer	Husqvarna	19	+0.359	5	16
4	5	(Spain) Jaume Masià	Honda	19	+0.382	7	13
5	53	(Turkey) Deniz Öncü	KTM	19	+0.557	1	11
6	96	(Spain) Daniel Holgado	KTM	19	+1.133	11	10
7	18	(Italy) Matteo Bertelle	Honda	19	+1.288	13	9
8	54	(Italy) Riccardo Rossi	Honda	19	+1.307	17	8
9	6	(Japan) Ryusei Yamanaka	Gas Gas	19	+1.413	4	7
10	27	(Japan) Kaito Toba	Honda	19	+1.445	22	6
11	48	(Spain) Iván Ortolá	KTM	19	+1.468	16	5
12	66	(Australia) Joel Kelso	CFMoto	19	+2.337	14	4
13	10	(Brazil) Diogo Moreira	KTM	19	+2.409	2	3
14	43	(Spain) Xavier Artigas	CFMoto	19	+6.497	19	2
15	31	(Spain) Adrián Fernández	Honda	19	+6.663	8	1
16	99	(Spain) José Antonio Rueda	KTM	19	+6.813	9	
17	82	(Italy) Stefano Nepa	KTM	19	+6.972	15	
18	21	(Spain) Vicente Pérez	KTM	19	+14.484	23	
19	7	(Italy) Filippo Farioli	KTM	19	+15.922	24	
20	19	(United Kingdom) Scott Ogden	Honda	19	+16.441	26	
21	20	(France) Lorenzo Fellon	KTM	19	+18.035	30	
22	9	(Italy) Nicola Carraro	Honda	19	+28.738	18	
23	70	(United Kingdom) Joshua Whatley	Honda	19	+31.758	21	
24	63	(Malaysia) Syarifuddin Azman	KTM	19	+33.894	20	
25	38	(Spain) David Salvador	KTM	19	+34.011	28	
26	64	(Indonesia) Mario Aji	Honda	19	+34.104	25	
27	32	(Thailand) Krittapat Keankum	KTM	19	+1:15.028	29	
28	33	(Thailand) Tatchakorn Buasri	Honda	18	+1 lap	27	
Ret	44	(Spain) David Muñoz	KTM	9	Collision damage	10	
Ret	71	(Japan) Ayumu Sasaki	Husqvarna	8	Collision damage	3	
Fastest lap: (Turkey) Deniz Öncü (KTM) – 1:42.346 (lap 10)
OFFICIAL MOTO3 RACE REPORT

== Championship standings after the race ==
Below are the standings for the top five riders, constructors, and teams after the round.

=== MotoGP ===
Riders' Championship standings

	Pos.	Rider	Points
	1	(Italy) Francesco Bagnaia	389
	2	(Spain) Jorge Martín	376
	3	(Italy) Marco Bezzecchi	310
	4	(South Africa) Brad Binder	249
1	5	(Spain) Aleix Espargaró	198

Constructors' Championship standings

	Pos.	Constructor	Points
	1	(Italy) Ducati	589
	2	(Austria) KTM	321
	3	(Italy) Aprilia	287
1	4	(Japan) Honda	166
1	5	(Japan) Yamaha	165

Teams' Championship standings

Pos.	Team	Points
1	(Italy) Prima Pramac Racing	570
2	(Italy) Mooney VR46 Racing Team	474
3	(Italy) Ducati Lenovo Team	444
4	(Austria) Red Bull KTM Factory Racing	393
5	(Italy) Aprilia Racing	368

=== Moto2 ===
Riders' Championship standings

Pos.	Rider	Points
1	(Spain) Pedro Acosta	300.5
2	(Italy) Tony Arbolino	237.5
3	(United Kingdom) Jake Dixon	172
4	(Spain) Arón Canet	159
5	(Thailand) Somkiat Chantra	143.5

Constructors' Championship standings

Pos.	Constructor	Points
1	(Germany) Kalex	402.5
2	(Italy) Boscoscuro	211
3	(Switzerland) Forward	1

Teams' Championship standings

	Pos.	Team	Points
	1	(Finland) Red Bull KTM Ajo	372.5
	2	(Belgium) Elf Marc VDS Racing Team	319.5
1	3	(Italy) Beta Tools Speed Up	264
1	4	(Japan) Idemitsu Honda Team Asia	250
2	5	(Spain) Pons Wegow Los40	243

=== Moto3 ===
Riders' Championship standings

	Pos.	Rider	Points
	1	(Spain) Jaume Masià	230
	2	(Japan) Ayumu Sasaki	213
1	3	(Colombia) David Alonso	205
1	4	(Spain) Daniel Holgado	205
	5	(Turkey) Deniz Öncü	191

Constructors' Championship standings

Pos.	Constructor	Points
1	(Austria) KTM	349
2	(Japan) Honda	281
3	(Sweden) Husqvarna	247
4	(Spain) Gas Gas	223
5	(China) CFMoto	91

Teams' Championship standings

	Pos.	Team	Points
	1	(Germany) Liqui Moly Husqvarna Intact GP	318
	2	(Finland) Red Bull KTM Ajo	302
	3	(Luxembourg) Leopard Racing	292
1	4	(Spain) Gaviota GasGas Aspar Team	276
1	5	(Italy) Angeluss MTA Team	257

== Notes ==
Previous race: 2023 Australian Grand Prix	FIM Grand Prix World Championship; 2023 season	Next race: 2023 Malaysian Grand Prix
Previous race: 2022 Thailand Grand Prix	Thailand motorcycle Grand Prix	Next race: 2024 Thailand Grand Prix
