= 2019 Asia Talent Cup =

2019 Asia Talent Cup
Previous:	2018	Next:	2021

The 2019 Idemitsu Asia Talent Cup was the sixth season of the Asia Talent Cup. The season consisted of 12 races held across six rounds, beginning on March 10 at the Losail International Circuit in Qatar and concluding on November 3 at the Sepang International Circuit in Malaysia.

The season was tragically marked by the death of Indonesian rider Afridza Munandar during the final round at Sepang. Sho Nishimura of Japan was crowned the champion after a season-long battle with compatriot Takuma Matsuyama.

== Season summary ==
The season began with a dominant performance by Sho Nishimura, who swept both races in the opening round in Qatar. As the championship moved to Thailand and the first visit to Malaysia, the competition tightened with Indonesian rider Afridza Munandar and Thai rider Tatchakorn Buasri taking victories.

The title fight intensified in the latter half of the season. Takuma Matsuyama surged into contention with a "double" victory at the second Buriram round and a win at his home race in Motegi. Heading into the season finale at Sepang, Matsuyama held a 12-point lead over Nishimura, with Munandar also mathematically in the hunt.

The finale was overshadowed by a fatal accident involving Munandar on the opening lap of Race 1. Following a red flag and the subsequent cancellation of the race, the riders voted to compete in Race 2 the following day in his honor. Nishimura secured the championship title in the final race, while Malaysian rider Syarifuddin Azman claimed his maiden victory on home soil.

== Entry list ==
No.	Rider	Rounds
2	(Japan) Rei Wakamatsu	1–5
3	(Japan) Sho Nishimura	All
4	(Indonesia) Afridza Munandar	All
5	(Thailand) Tatchakorn Buasri	All
6	(Thailand) Warit Thongnoppakun	All
7	(Indonesia) Hildhan Kusuma	All
8	(Japan) Ryosuke Bando	3–6
9	(Malaysia) Idil Bin Mahadi	1–4
10	(Indonesia) Herjun Firdaus	All
11	(Japan) Takuma Matsuyama	All
12	(Australia) Jacob Roulstone	All
13	(Malaysia) Syarifuddin Azman	All
14	(Japan) Shoki Igarashi	All
15	(Thailand) Piyawat Patoomyos	All
16	(Indonesia) Adenanta Putra	All
17	(Turkey) Kadir Erbay	1–4, 6
18	(Australia) Harrison Voight	All
19	(Australia) Luke Power	All
20	(Indonesia) Abdul Mutaqim	All
21	(Japan) Shinji Ogo	3, 5
22	(Thailand) Buapa Thukarij	4
23	(Malaysia) Raduan Idlan	6
24	(Japan) Kanta Hamada	5–6

== Race calendar and results ==
Rnd.		Circuit	Date	Pole position	Winning rider
1	R1	(Qatar) Losail International Circuit	09 March	(Japan) Sho Nishimura	(Japan) Sho Nishimura
1	R2	(Qatar) Losail International Circuit	10 March	(Japan) Sho Nishimura	(Japan) Sho Nishimura
2	R1	(Thailand) Chang International Circuit	16 March	(Thailand) Tatchakorn Buasri	(Indonesia) Afridza Munandar
2	R2	(Thailand) Chang International Circuit	17 March	(Thailand) Tatchakorn Buasri	(Thailand) Tatchakorn Buasri
3	R1	(Malaysia) Sepang International Circuit	15 June	(Japan) Sho Nishimura	(Japan) Sho Nishimura
3	R2	(Malaysia) Sepang International Circuit	16 June	(Japan) Sho Nishimura	(Indonesia) Afridza Munandar
4	R1	(Thailand) Chang International Circuit	05 October	(Indonesia) Afridza Munandar	(Japan) Takuma Matsuyama
4	R2	(Thailand) Chang International Circuit	06 October	(Indonesia) Afridza Munandar	(Japan) Takuma Matsuyama
5	R1	(Japan) Twin Ring Motegi	19 October	(Japan) Takuma Matsuyama	(Japan) Takuma Matsuyama
5	R2	(Japan) Twin Ring Motegi	20 October	(Japan) Takuma Matsuyama	(Japan) Sho Nishimura
6	R1	(Malaysia) Sepang International Circuit	02 November	(Japan) Takuma Matsuyama	Race Cancelled
6	R2	(Malaysia) Sepang International Circuit	03 November	(Japan) Takuma Matsuyama	(Malaysia) Syarifuddin Azman

== Championship standings ==
Scoring system

Points were awarded to the top fifteen finishers. A rider had to finish the race to earn points.

Position	1st	2nd	3rd	4th	5th	6th	7th	8th	9th	10th	11th	12th	13th	14th	15th
Points	25	20	16	13	11	10	9	8	7	6	5	4	3	2	1

Pos.	Rider	QAT (Qatar)		THA1 (Thailand)		MAL1 (Malaysia)		THA2 (Thailand)		JPN (Japan)		MAL2 (Malaysia)		Pts
Pos.	Rider	R1	R2	R1	R2	R1	R2	R1	R2	R1	R2	R1	R2	Pts
1	(Japan) Sho Nishimura	1^{P}	1^{P}	2	2	1^{P}	4^{P}	12	6	13	1	C	2	177
2	(Japan) Takuma Matsuyama	2	2	3	5	3	Ret	1	1	1^{P}	5^{P}	C	Ret^{P}	169
3	(Indonesia) Afridza Munandar	Ret	5	1	3	2	1	Ret^{P}	3^{P}	2	7	C		142
4	(Indonesia) Adenanta Putra	4	3	5	4	6	5	9	7	Ret	8	C	3	123
5	(Thailand) Tatchakorn Buasri	7	6	4^{P}	1^{P}	11	10	Ret	4	4	2	C	Ret	118
6	(Malaysia) Syarifuddin Azman	14	11	10	Ret	7	3	3	2	3	4	C	1	112
7	(Thailand) Warit Thongnoppakun	3	8	6	6	4	2	10	8	6	9	C	8	112
8	(Indonesia) Herjun Firdaus	6	4	7	Ret	8	6	2	11	7	12	C	4	91
9	(Thailand) Piyawat Patoomyos	5	Ret	9	8	10	11	5	9	12	13	C	6	78
10	(Japan) Shoki Igarashi	8	7	16	7	5	7	Ret	10	5	3	C	Ret	70
11	(Australia) Jacob Roulstone	15	15	14	11	18	13	7	5	Ret	10	C	5	54
12	(Indonesia) Hildhan Kusuma	12	13	13	Ret	9	8	Ret	Ret	14	14	C	7	41
13	(Australia) Harrison Voight	11	10	12	Ret	13	9	Ret	15	9	Ret	C	Ret	39
14	(Indonesia) Abdul Mutaqim	9	14	11	9	12	12	Ret	Ret	11	Ret	C	Ret	38
15	(Malaysia) Idil Bin Mahadi	13	12	8	Ret	15	15	4	12					34
16	(Japan) Ryosuke Bando	Ret	9	Ret	12	14	Ret	8	13					25
17	(Australia) Luke Power	10	Ret	Ret	10	16	14	Ret	DNS	Ret	16	C	9	24
18	(Japan) Shota Kiuchi	Ret	Ret							10	6			16
19	(Turkey) Kadir Erbay	16	Ret	DNS	14	19	17	11	16			C	10	16
20	(Japan) Kanta Hamada									8	11	C	Ret	13
21	(Japan) Rei Wakamatsu	17	16	15	13	17	16	13	14	Ret	DNS			13
22	(Thailand) Buapa Thukarij							6	Ret					11
23	(Malaysia) Raduan Idlan											C	11	5
24	(Japan) Shinji Ogo					20	18			15	15			4
Pos.	Rider	R1	R2	R1	R2	R1	R2	R1	R2	R1	R2	R1	R2	Pts
Pos.	Rider	QAT (Qatar)		THA1 (Thailand)		MAL1 (Malaysia)		THA2 (Thailand)		JPN (Japan)		MAL2 (Malaysia)		Pts

Colour	Result
Gold	Winner
Silver	Second place
Bronze	Third place
Green	Points classification
Blue	Non-points classification
Blue	Non-classified finish (NC)
Purple	Retired, not classified (Ret)
Red	Did not qualify (DNQ)
Red	Did not pre-qualify (DNPQ)
Black	Disqualified (DSQ)
White	Did not start (DNS)
White	Withdrew (WD)
White	Race cancelled (C)
Blank	Did not practice (DNP)
Blank	Did not arrive (DNA)
Blank	Excluded (EX)

P – Pole position
