= 2021 Asia Talent Cup =

Motorcycle racing series

2021 Asia Talent Cup
Previous:	2019	Next:	2022

The 2021 Honda Idemitsu Asia Talent Cup was the seventh season of the Asia Talent Cup. Japanese rider Taiyo Furusato won the championship after winning every race, while Malaysian Danial Sharil finished in second, and Gun Mie in third.

== Entry list ==
2021 entry list
No.	Rider
2	(Japan) Rei Wakamatsu
3	(Indonesia) Fadillah Aditama
5	(Japan) Gun Mie
6	(Australia) Carter Thompson
7	(India) Mohamed Salih
8	(Japan) Kanta Hamada
9	(Thailand) Thanakorn Lakham
10	(Indonesia) Herjun Firdaus
11	(Indonesia) Herlian Dandi
12	(Australia) Marianos Nikolis
13	(Malaysia) Hakim Danish
14	(Japan) Tetsuya Fujita
15	(Japan) Taiyo Furusato
16	(Thailand) Watcharin Tubtimon
17	(Japan) Masaya Hongo
18	(Australia) Tom Drane
19	(Indonesia) Azryan Dheyo
20	(Malaysia) Sharul Sharil
21	(Malaysia) Danial Sharil
22	(Thailand) Thurakjj Buapa
23	(Qatar) Hamad Al-Sahouti
Source: AsiaTalentCup.com

== Calendar ==
The following Grand prix were the scheduled Grand prix for the 2021 Asia Talent Cup.

2021 calendar
Round	Round	Date	Circuit
1	Qatar Round	26 March - 28 March	Losail International Circuit
2	(Qatar) Doha Round	2 April - 4 April	Losail International Circuit
3	(Indonesia) Indonesian Round	12 November - 14 November	Mandalika International Street Circuit
4	(Indonesia) Mandalika Round	19 November - 21 November	Mandalika International Street Circuit

=== Cancelled Races ===
The following Grand prix were the scheduled Grand prix for the 2021 Asia Talent Cup, but were cancelled.

2021 cancelled races
Round	Circuit
(Malaysia) 2021 Malaysian motorcycle Grand Prix	Sepang International Circuit
2021 Thailand motorcycle Grand Prix	Chang International Circuit

== Results ==
The following results are the official race results of the 2021 Asia Talent Cup.

2021 Grand Prix results
Round	Round	Date	Circuit	Pole position	Race winner
1	Qatar Grand Prix	27 March	Losail International Circuit	(Japan) Taiyo Furusato	(Japan) Taiyo Furusato
1	Qatar Grand Prix	28 March	Losail International Circuit	(Japan) Taiyo Furusato	(Japan) Taiyo Furusato
2	(Qatar) Doha Grand Prix	3 April	Losail International Circuit	(Japan) Taiyo Furusato	(Japan) Taiyo Furusato
2	(Qatar) Doha Grand Prix	4 April	Losail International Circuit	(Japan) Taiyo Furusato	(Japan) Taiyo Furusato
3	(Indonesia) Indonesian Grand Prix	13 November	Mandalika International Street Circuit	(Malaysia) Danial Sharil	(Japan) Taiyo Furusato
3	(Indonesia) Indonesian Grand Prix	14 November	Mandalika International Street Circuit	(Malaysia) Danial Sharil	(Japan) Taiyo Furusato
4	(Indonesia) WSBK Indonesian Grand Prix	20 November	Mandalika International Street Circuit	(Malaysia) Danial Sharil	(Japan) Taiyo Furusato
4	(Indonesia) WSBK Indonesian Grand Prix	21 November	Mandalika International Street Circuit	(Malaysia) Danial Sharil	Race Cancelled

== Riders' Championship standings ==
Scoring System

Points are awarded to the top fifteen finishers. A rider has to finish the race to earn points.

Position	1st	2nd	3rd	4th	5th	6th	7th	8th	9th	10th	11th	12th	13th	14th	15th
Points	25	20	16	13	11	10	9	8	7	6	5	4	3	2	1

Pos.	Rider	QAT1 (Qatar)	QAT2 (Qatar)	DOH1 (Qatar)	DOH2 (Qatar)	IND1 (Indonesia)	IND2 (Indonesia)	SBK1 (Indonesia)	SBK2 (Indonesia)	Pts
1	(Japan) Taiyo Furusato	1	1	1	1	1	1	1	C	175
2	(Malaysia) Danial Sharil	7	6	2	2	2	2	2	C	119
3	(Japan) Gun Mie	2	5	3	6	3	3	3	C	105
4	(Australia) Carter Thompson	4	7	5	4	4	5	Ret	C	70
5	(Malaysia) Hakim Danish	3	3	7	3	Ret	DNS			57
6	(Japan) Kanta Hamada	6	2	6	7	Ret	DNS			49
7	(Japan) Masaya Hongo	13	9	12	9	Ret	4	5	C	45
8	(Malaysia) Sharul Sharil	5	8	14	11	7	11	11	C	45
9	(Japan) Rei Wakamatsu	Ret	4	4	Ret	11	9	10	C	44
10	(Japan) Tetsuya Fujita	10	12	11	10	9	7	Ret	C	37
11	(Australia) Marianos Nikolis	9	10	10	5	14	Ret	13	C	35
12	(Indonesia) Herjun Firdaus					6	6	4	C	33
13	(Indonesia) Herlian Dandi	12	11	13	14	Ret	10	7	C	29
14	(Australia) Tom Drane	14	13	9	8	13	15	12	C	28
15	(Indonesia) Reykat Fadillah					5	8	8	C	27
16	(Indonesia) Fadillah Aditama	Ret	Ret	8	Ret	Ret	16	6	C	18
17	(Indonesia) Veda Ega Pratama					8	Ret	9	C	15
18	(Thailand) Thanakorn Lakharn	8	Ret	Ret	13	12	17	17	C	15
19	(Thailand) Thurakij Buapa	15	14	17	15	10	12	15	C	15
20	(Qatar) Yousef Al-Darwish	11	Ret	Ret	Ret					5
21	(Indonesia) Azryan Dheyo	17	16	Ret	17	Ret	13	14	C	5
22	(Qatar) Hamad Al-Sahouti	Ret	17	16	12					4
23	(Thailand) Watcharin Tubtimon	16	15	15	16	Ret	14	16	C	4
	(India) Mohamed Mikail	18	18	18	18					0
	(Qatar) Saad Al-Harqan	19	19	Ret	19					0
Pos.	Rider	QAT1 (Qatar)	QAT2 (Qatar)	DOH1 (Qatar)	DOH2 (Qatar)	IND1 (Indonesia)	IND2 (Indonesia)	SBK1 (Indonesia)	SBK2 (Indonesia)	Pts
