= Rei Wakamatsu =

Japanese motorcycle racer (born 2006)

Rei Wakamatsu 若松 怜
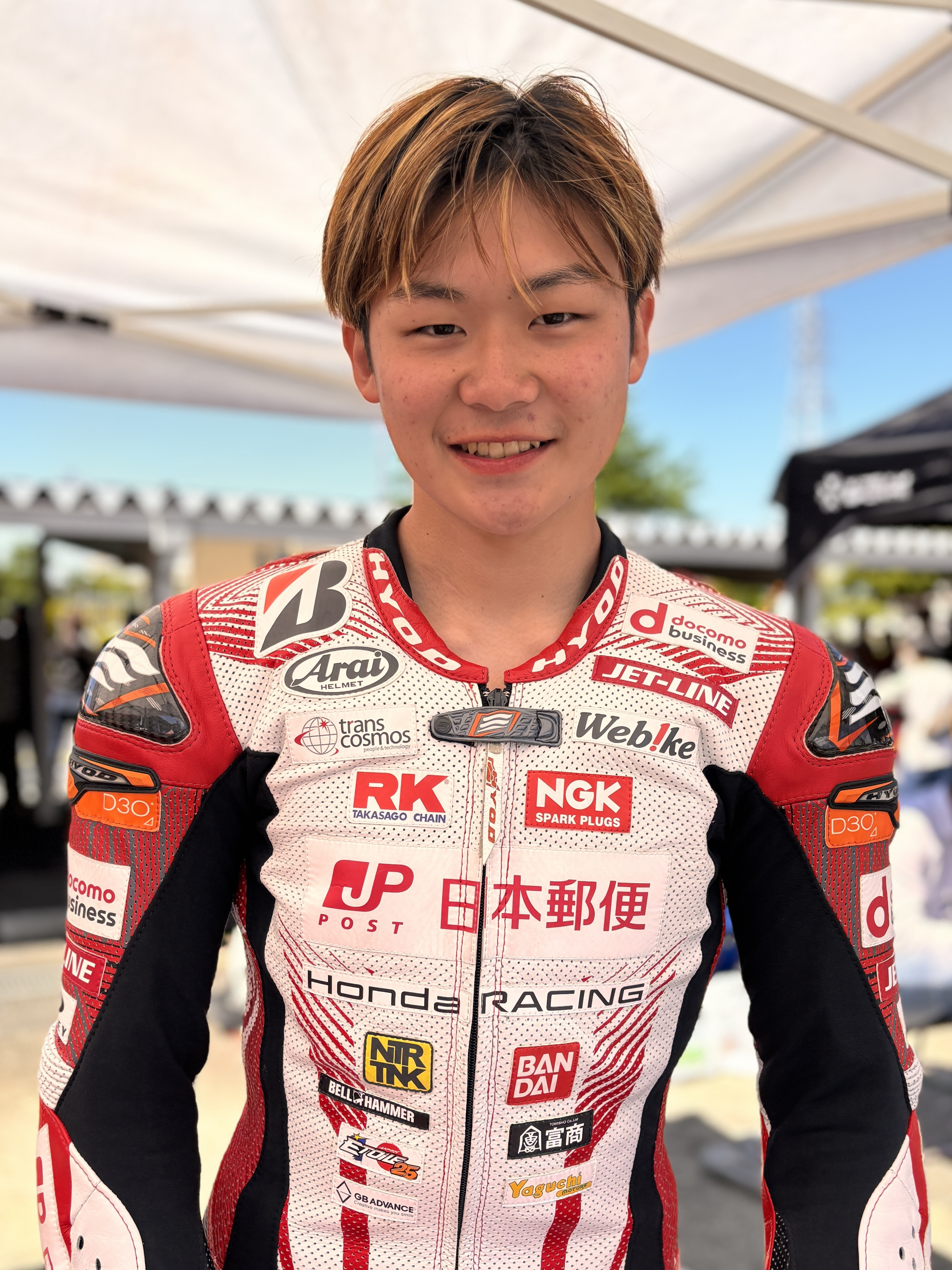
- Wakamatsu in 2025
- Born: 2 March 2006 (age 20); Katsushika, Tokyo, Japan
- Nationality: Japanese
- Current team: Japan Post NTT docomo Business
- Bike number: 23
Statistics
All Japan J-GP3
Active years	2020–
Championships	0
Manufacturer	Honda (2020–)
Last season (2026)	4th (65 pts)
Starts / Wins / Podiums / Poles / F. laps / Points; 31 / 5 / 13 / 2 / 4 / 422.5

Rei Wakamatsu (Japanese: 若松 怜, Hepburn: Wakamatsu Rei; born 2 March 2006) is a Japanese motorcycle racer who competes in the J-GP3 class of the All Japan Road Race Championship for Japan Post NTT docomo Business.

Wakamatsu made his Grand Prix debut in the Moto3 World Championship in 2024, acting as a replacement rider for MLav Racing. He is also an Asia Talent Cup graduate, having participated in the 2019, 2021 and 2022 seasons.

== Early life ==
Wakamatsu was born in the Katsushika ward of Tokyo, Japan. He started riding bikes at the age of 5, influenced by his father Hiroki, who was an All Japan Road Race 125cc rider at the time. He was a student of the MFJ Road Race Academy and Musashi HARC-Pro Scholarship, where he was mentored by former 125cc world champion Kazuto Sakata, who sponsored him for a wildcard appearance in the 2018 All Japan Road Race Championship at Tsukuba Circuit.

== Career ==
=== Asia Talent Cup ===
Wakamatsu was selected to compete in the 2019 Asia Talent Cup season, at the age of 13. His best result in his debut year was a 12th place at Sepang. He was set to start his second Cup season in 2020 but the championship was cancelled after just one round at Qatar due to the COVID-19 pandemic. Wakamatsu faced his second full-time Asia Talent Cup season in 2021, where his best results were two fourth-place finishes at Lusail.

In 2022, Wakamatsu would participate in his third and final Asia Talent Cup season. He earned his maiden podium with a second-place finish at Sepang, only milliseconds off first, and finished in ninth place overall.

=== All Japan Road Race Championship ===
==== J-GP3 (2020–present) ====
In October 2020, Wakamatsu made a wildcard appearance in the J-GP3 class of the All Japan Road Race Championship at Motegi, where he claimed a tenth-place finish. In 2021, Wakamatsu competed part-time in the J-GP3 class, where he achieved a fifth best place finish at Suzuka.

In 2022, Wakamatsu entered his first full-time J-GP3 season, where he scored his first class podium at Sportsland Sugo. He ended the season in seventh place in the standings, despite missing two rounds due to his participation in the Asia Talent Cup. Wakamatsu signed with Kohara Racing TP for the 2023 J-GP3 season. He clinched three podiums in total, one being his maiden win at Okayama, and finished third in the overall standings. In 2024, he stayed with the same team. He won the opening round at Motegi, in front of Ryota Ogiwara, and claimed a second win at Okayama later that season. He finished on the podium in every round except for the final one at Suzuka, which placed him as runner-up in the final standings.

Wakamatsu won the opening round of the 2025 J-GP3 championship in front of Hiroki Ono at Sportsland Sugo, where he scored his first class podium in 2022. However, due to an injury, he missed the final round at Suzuka and finished the season in fourth place.

=== Moto3 World Championship ===
==== MLav Racing (2024) ====
Wakamatsu made his Grand Prix debut at the 2024 Japanese motorcycle Grand Prix in Moto3, riding aboard a Honda NSF250RW, similar to the one in J-GP3, as a replacement rider for MLav Racing. He finished the race in 20th place.

== Career statistics ==
=== Motegi Road Race Championship ===
==== Races by year ====
(key) (Races in bold indicate pole position; races in italics indicate fastest lap)

Year	Class	Bike	1	2	3	4	Pos	Pts
2018	ST150	Honda	MOT1	MOT2	**MOT3**; 1	MOT4; 1	4th	40
2019	J-GP3	Honda	MOT1; 8	MOT2; 7	MOT3; 6	MOT4; 9	10th	10
2020	J-GP3	Honda	MOT1; 4	MOT2; C	MOT3; Ret	MOT4; 2	4th	30

=== Asia Talent Cup ===
==== Races by year ====
(key) (Races in bold indicate pole position; races in italics indicate fastest lap)

Year	Bike	1		2		3		4		5		6		Pos	Pts
Year	Bike	R1	R2	R1	R2	R1	R2	R1	R2	R1	R2	R1	R2	Pos	Pts
2019	Honda	QAT; 17	QAT; 16	THA; 15	THA; 13	MAL; 17	MAL; 12	THA; 13	THA; 14	JPN; Ret	JPN; Ret	SEP; C	SEP	21st	13
2021	Honda	QAT; Ret	QAT; 4	DOH; 4	DOH; Ret	INA; 11	INA; 9	MAN; 10	MAN; C					9th	44
2022	Honda	QAT; Ret	QAT; 9	INA; 5	INA; 6	JPN; 4	JPN; C	THA; Ret	THA	MAL; 2	MAL; 4	MAN; 9	MAN; 13	9th	85

=== All Japan Road Race Championship ===
==== Races by year ====
(key) (Races in bold indicate pole position; races in italics indicate fastest lap)

Year	Class	Bike	1	2	3	4	5	6	7	Pos	Pts
2020	J-GP3	Honda	SUG	OKA	AUT	MOT; 10	SUZ			NC (Note: Competed under a Special Participation license which is ineligible for points.)	-
2021	J-GP3	Honda	MOT	SUG; 6	TSU1; 12	TSU2; 8	SUZ; 5	OKA	AUT	11th	36
2022	J-GP3	Honda	MOT; 9	SUG; 3	TSU; 6	AUT	OKA	SUZ; 6		7th	43
2023	J-GP3	Honda	MOT; 5	SUG; 8	TSU; 2	AUT; 4	OKA; 1	SUZ; 4		3rd	93
2024	J-GP3	Honda	MOT; 1	SUG; 2	TSU; 2	AUT; 3	**OKA**; 1	**SUZ**; 11		2nd	114
2025	J-GP3	Honda	SUG; 1	TSU1; 19†	TSU2; 2	MOT; 2	AUT; 4‡	OKA	SUZ; DNS	4th	71.5
2026	J-GP3	Honda	SUG; 2	AUT; Ret	TSU; 2	MOT; 20†	OKA; 1	SUZ; 22†		4th	65

- † – Rider did not finish the race, but was classified as he completed more than 75% of the race distance.
- ‡ – Half points were awarded based on the qualifying results.

=== Grand Prix motorcycle racing ===
==== By season ====
Season	Class	Motorcycle	Team	Race	Win	Podium	Pole	FLap	Pts	Plcd
2024	Moto3	Honda	MLav Racing	1	0	0	0	0	0	31st
Total				**1**	**0**	**0**	**0**	**0**	**0**	

==== By class ====
Class	Seasons	1st GP	1st pod	1st win	Race	Win	Podiums	Pole	FLap	Pts	WChmp
Moto3	2024	2024 Japan			1	0	0	0	0	0	0
Total	2024				**1**	**0**	**0**	**0**	**0**	**0**	**0**

==== Races by year ====
(key) (Races in bold indicate pole position, races in italics indicate fastest lap)

Year	Class	Bike	1	2	3	4	5	6	7	8	9	10	11	12	13	14	15	16	17	18	19	20	Pos	Pts
2024	Moto3	Honda	QAT	POR	AME	SPA	FRA	CAT	ITA	NED	GER	GBR	AUT	ARA	RSM	EMI	INA	JPN; 20	AUS	THA	MAL	SLD	31st	0
