= Rajini Krishnan =

Indian motorcycle rider

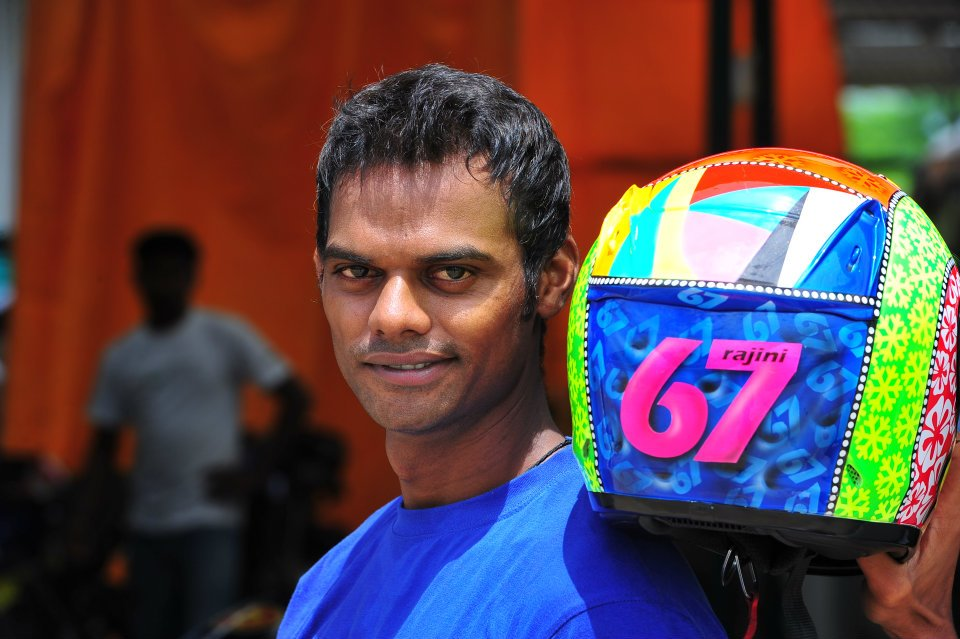
- Rajini with his Helmet .
- Born: 13 July 1980 (age 46); Chennai, Tamil Nadu, India
- Nationality: India
- Teams: MOTO-REV INDIA, RRR, Chia Racing, Malaysia, QMMF team, Qatar

Championship titles
- 9 Times Indian National champion; 3 times Malyasia Champion

Rajini Krishnan (born 13 July 1980) is an Indian motorcycle racer. He became national road racing champion in 2003 and went on to win eight more National titles till 2011 and, after 10 years he won the 2021 National title again on 05/02/2022, as the championship was delayed due to COVID-19. In 2013, he became the first Indian winner of an international road racing event with his victory at the Losail Asian Road Racing Championship in Qatar. He won the Malaysian Superbike championship (Open class) in 2015.

Krishnan was racing for Motorev India as junior driver in the 2011 FIM Asian Road Racing Championship (ARRC).

== Achievements ==
A record 10 national titles, including nine consecutive national road racing Championship title in multiple categories. From 2003 to 2012

First Indian to win an overseas motorcycle racing championship

Overseas appearances and podiums include:

- Champion: Malaysian Super Series –150 cc – 2006
- 2nd in championship in Malaysian Super Series – 600cc – 2008
- First Indian to win podium – 3rd place in APRC (FIM Asian Championship)–600cc – 2009
- First Indian to take part in FIM World Endurance 24 Hours Championship – 2010
- Champion – Losail Asian Championship – Qatar: 600cc (2012– 2013)
- Champion – 2015 Malaysia Super bike championship ( 1000 cc)
- Taking part in Qatar SBK 1000 cc champion (2015–2016). Currently in 4th position.
- Has got a Podium (2nd place) in his 2nd year on a 1000 cc superbike there
