= Mario Aji =

Indonesian motorcycle racer (born 2004)

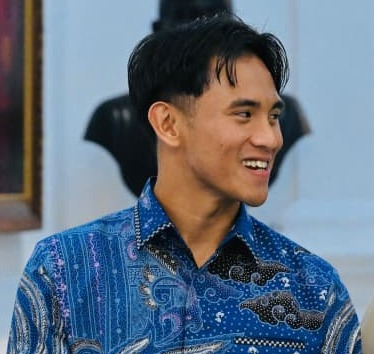
- Aji in 2025
- Nationality: Indonesian
- Born: 16 March 2004 (age 22); Madiun, Indonesia
- Current team: Idemitsu Honda Team Asia
- Bike number: 64
Motorcycle racing career statistics
Moto2 World Championship
Active years	2024–
Manufacturers	Kalex
2025 championship position	26th (8 pts)
Starts / Wins / Podiums / Poles / F. laps / Points; 45 / 0 / 0 / 0 / 0 / 15
Moto3 World Championship
Active years	2021–2023
Manufacturers	Honda
2023 championship position	31st (4 pts)
Starts / Wins / Podiums / Poles / F. laps / Points; 41 / 0 / 0 / 0 / 0 / 9

Mario Suryo Aji (born 16 March 2004) is an Indonesian Grand Prix motorcycle racer for Idemitsu Honda Team Asia in the 2025 Moto2 World Championship.

== Career statistics ==
=== Asia Talent Cup ===
==== Races by year ====
(key) (Races in bold indicate pole position; races in italics indicate fastest lap)

Year	Bike	1	2	3	4	5	6	7	8	9	10	11	12	Pos	Pts
2018	Honda	QAT1; 2	QAT1; 4	THA1; 2	THA2; NC	MAL1; 1	MAL2; 9	CHA1; NC	CHA2; 5	**JPN1**; 6	**JPN2**; 4	SEP1; 3	SEP2; 5	5th	123

=== Red Bull MotoGP Rookies Cup ===
==== Races by year ====
(key) (Races in bold indicate pole position, races in italics indicate fastest lap)

Year	1	2	3	4	5	6	7	8	9	10	11	12	13	14	Pos	Pts
2019	JER1; 10	JER2; 10	MUG; 14	ASS1	ASS2	SAC1	SAC2	RBR1; Ret	RBR2; 15	MIS; 10	ARA1; 5	ARA2; 6			16th	42
2020	RBR1; 13	RBR2; 19	RBR3; 14	RBR4; 12	ARA1; 12	ARA2; 11	ARA3; 11	ARA4; 11	VAL1; 2	VAL2; 10	VAL3; 5	VAL4; Ret			11th	65
2021	POR1; 12	POR2; 11	SPA1; 8	SPA2; 5	MUG1; 8	MUG2; Ret	GER1; Ret	GER2; 7	RBR1; 14	RBR2; 11	RBR3; 17	RBR4; 15	ARA1	ARA2	16th	53

=== FIM CEV Moto3 Junior World Championship ===
==== Races by year ====
(key) (Races in bold indicate pole position, races in italics indicate fastest lap)

Year	Bike	1	2	3	4	5	6	7	8	9	10	11	12	Pos	Pts
2019	Honda	EST; 4	VAL1; 16	VAL2; 18	FRA; Ret	CAT1	CAT2	ARA; 10	JER1; Ret	JER2; 9	ALB; Ret	VAL3; 16	VAL4; 26	18th	26
2020	Honda	EST	POR	JER1; DNS	JER2; DNS	JER3; DNS	ARA1; 22	ARA2; Ret	ARA3; 12	VAL1; 6	VAL2; 7	VAL3; Ret		16th	23
2021	Honda	EST; 4	VAL1; 8	VAL2; 5	**CAT1**; 6	**CAT2**; Ret	POR; DNS	ARA; Ret	JER1; Ret	JER2; 8	RSM; 8	VAL3	VAL4	12th	58

=== Grand Prix motorcycle racing ===
==== By season ====
Season	Class	Motorcycle	Team	Race	Win	Podium	Pole	FLap	Pts	Plcd
2021	Moto3	Honda	Honda Team Asia	1	0	0	0	0	0	36th
2022	Moto3	Honda	Honda Team Asia	20	0	0	0	0	5	26th
2023	Moto3	Honda	Honda Team Asia	20	0	0	0	0	4	31st
2024	Moto2	Kalex	Idemitsu Honda Team Asia	19	0	0	0	0	4	29th
2025	Moto2	Kalex	Idemitsu Honda Team Asia	12	0	0	0	0	8	26th
2026	Moto2	Kalex	Idemitsu Honda Team Asia	14	0	0	0	0	3*	27th*
Total				**86**	**0**	**0**	**0**	**0**	**24**	

==== By class ====
Class	Seasons	1st GP	1st pod	1st win	Race	Win	Podiums	Pole	FLap	Pts	WChmp
Moto3	2021–2023	2021 Emilia Romagna			41	0	0	0	0	9	0
Moto2	2024–present	2024 Qatar			45	0	0	0	0	15	0
Total	2021–present				**86**	**0**	**0**	**0**	**0**	**24**	**0**

==== Races by year ====
(key) (Races in bold indicate pole position; races in italics indicate fastest lap)

Year	Class	Bike	1	2	3	4	5	6	7	8	9	10	11	12	13	14	15	16	17	18	19	20	21	22	Pos	Pts
2021	Moto3	Honda	QAT	DOH	POR	SPA	FRA	ITA	CAT	GER	NED	STY	AUT	GBR	ARA	RSM	AME	EMI; 21	ALR	VAL					36th	0
2022	Moto3	Honda	QAT; 19	INA; 14	ARG; 21	AME; 21	POR; 16	SPA; 17	FRA; 22	ITA; 13	CAT; Ret	GER; 23	NED; 18	GBR; 17	AUT; 24	RSM; Ret	ARA; 24	JPN; 17	THA; 21	AUS; Ret	MAL; 21	VAL; 27			26th	5
2023	Moto3	Honda	POR; 18	ARG; Ret	AME; 12	SPA; 19	FRA; 21	ITA; 20	GER; 19	NED; 23	GBR; 22	AUT; 26	CAT; 17	RSM; 26	IND; 18	JPN; 23	INA; 25	AUS; Ret	THA; 26	MAL; 19	QAT; 25	VAL; 23			31st	4
2024	Moto2	Kalex	QAT; 24	POR; 23	AME; Ret	SPA; 16	FRA	CAT; 15	ITA; 15	NED; 22	GER; Ret	GBR; Ret	AUT; Ret	ARA; 15	RSM; 25	EMI; 19	INA; 18	JPN; NC	AUS; 15	THA; 16	MAL; 17	SLD; 16			29th	4
2025	Moto2	Kalex	THA; 15	ARG; Ret	AME; 9	QAT; 23	SPA; DNS	FRA	GBR; WD	ARA	ITA	NED	GER	CZE	AUT	HUN	CAT; 23	RSM; 24	JPN; 21	INA; 19	AUS; 20	MAL; 22	POR; 21	VAL; 17	26th	8
2026	Moto2	Kalex	THA; Ret	BRA; 13	USA; Ret	SPA; Ret	FRA; 21	CAT	ITA	HUN	CZE	NED	GER; NC	GBR; 22	ARA; 24	RSM; 22	AUT; 17	JPN; Ret	INA; 20	AUS; C	MAL; Ret	QAT; 22	POR	VAL	27th*	3*

* Season still in progress.

== Suzuka 8 Hours results ==
Year	Team	Riders	Bike	Pos
2024	(Japan) SDG Team HARC-PRO Honda	(Japan) Yuki Kunii (Japan) Naomichi Uramoto	Honda CBR1000RR-R SP	8th
