= Haruki Noguchi =

Japanese motorcycle racer (2001–2023)

- Nationality: Japanese
- Born: June 20, 2001; Nara Prefecture, Japan
- Died: August 16, 2023 (aged 22); Kuta, Central Lombok Regency, West Nusa Tenggara, Indonesia
- Current team: SDG Honda Racing

Haruki Noguchi (埜口遥希, Noguchi Haruki) (June 20, 2001 – August 16, 2023) was a Japanese motorcycle racer riding for SDG Honda Racing. Noguchi was a member of MuSASHi RT HARC-PRO. He competed in the All Japan Road Race Championship in 2017 and 2018, placing second in the Asia Talent Cup standings, and in 2019, placing third in the Red Bull Rookies Cup standings. He died at age 22 after he was injured in a road race in Indonesia.

== Biography ==
Born in Nara Prefecture, Noguchi began riding motorcycles at 5 years old. In addition to his motorsport career, he was a student at the Faculty of Industrial Sociology, Ritsumeikan University.

In 2017, Noguchi had his first win in the Idemitsu Asia Talent Cup at Suzuka. In preparation for the ATC races in 2018, he was named a competitor to watch after finishing first in the pre-series qualification trials. In 2018, he won the ATC's round 2 race in Thailand. He would go on to finish second in the overall rankings that year.

=== 600 series ===
In 2019, Noguchi placed third in the 2019 Red Bull MotoGP Rookies Cup. In 2021, he won the Superstock 600 category at the All Japan Road Racing Championships.

=== Superbike series ===
In 2022, Noguchi moved up to the Superbike 1000 class. That year, he placed second in the Asia Superbike 1000 section of the Asia Road Racing Championship.

Noguchi started the 2023 Asia Road Racing Championships with two wins at the Buriram International Circuit in Thailand. In August 2023, alongside his SDG Honda Racing team-mates, Noguchi finished second in the 44th Coca-Cola Suzuka 8 Hours Endurance Race.

==== Death ====
On August 13, 2023, Noguchi was involved in a fatal accident at the lap 4 of the Asia Road Racing Championship at the Mandalika International Street Circuit, Indonesia in the ASB1000 class. He was hit by Malaysian rider Kasma Daniel who was in sixth position, just behind Azlan Shah of the factory BMW M1000RR, causing Kasma Daniel to be knocked down.

Daniel and Noguchi were taken to a local hospital for treatment, and the race was cancelled.

After three days in intensive care, Noguchi was pronounced dead on August 16, 2023, at the age of 22. At the time of his accident, Noguchi was placed second in the provisional 2023 ARRC rankings.

== Career statistics ==
=== Red Bull MotoGP Rookies Cup ===
==== Races by year ====
(key) (Races in bold indicate pole position; races in italics indicate fastest lap)

Year	1	2	3	4	5	6	7	8	9	10	11	12	Pos	Pts
2019	JER1; 6	JER2; 5	MUG; 3	ASS1; 3	ASS2; Ret	SAC1; 4	SAC2; Ret	RBR1; 3	RBR2; 1	**MIS**; 4	ARA1; 2	ARA2; 5	3rd	151

=== FIM CEV Moto3 Junior World Championship ===
==== Races by year ====
(key) (Races in bold indicate pole position, races in italics indicate fastest lap)

Year	Bike	1	2	3	4	5	6	7	8	9	10	11	12	Pos	Pts
2019	Honda	EST	VAL1; Ret	VAL2; 11	FRA; 20	CAT1; 8	CAT2; Ret	ARA; 20	JER1; 8	JER2; 6	ALB; 27	VAL1; 9	VAL2; 13	15th	41

=== ARRC Supersports 1000 Championship ===
==== Races by year ====
(key) (Races in bold indicate pole position; races in italics indicate fastest lap)

Year	Bike	1		2		3		4		5		6		Pos	Pts
Year	Bike	R1	R2	R1	R2	R1	R2	R1	R2	R1	R2	R1	R2	Pos	Pts
2023	Honda	CHA; 1	CHA; 1	SEP; 4	SEP; 2	**SUG**; 7	**SUG**; Ret	MAN; 4	MAN; C	ZHU	ZHU	CHA	CHA	6th	105
