= Moto4 Asia Cup =

Motorcycle racing competition

- Category: Motorcycle sport
- Region: Asia
- Inaugural season: 2014
- Constructors: Honda
- Tyre suppliers: Pirelli
- Riders' champion: (Japan) Hayato Chishiki
- Official website: Official website

The Moto4 Asia Cup, formerly known as the Asia Talent Cup, is a motorcycle road racing competition intended for young riders in Asia and Oceania. Organized by Dorna Sports, the promoter of the international Grand Prix motorcycle racing and Superbike World Championship series, the Cup had its inaugural season in 2014 after being founded the year prior. The championship will run under the Idemitsu Moto4 Asia Cup moniker from the 2026 season onwards, with sponsorship from Idemitsu, having previously been contracted with Shell Advance between 2014 and 2016. Alberto Puig has served as Director of the Cup since its inception in 2014.

Ai Ogura and Somkiat Chantra are the only Cup graduates to have raced in the top-flight MotoGP World Championship, in 2025.

== Motorcycle specifications ==
The series uses the One Make Bike system so that all racers will use the same motorcycle, namely the Honda NSF250R. Since 2024, all riders use series-specified Pirelli tyres.

Honda NSF250R Technical Data
Dimension	length 1,809 mm x width 560 mm x height 1,307 mm	
Wheelbase	1,219 mm	
Ground clearance	107 mm	
Seat height	729 mm	
Tank capacity	11 liters	
Frame type	Aluminum, twin tube	
Engine type	Liquid cooled 4-stroke engine	
Cylinder arrangement	Single cylinder, inclined 15º from vertical	
Engine displacement	249.3 cc	
Lubricant type	Semi dry sump, forced pressure and wet sump	
Transmission	6 speed	
Clutch type	Wet multi-plate	
Fuel supply system	PGM-FI	
Suspension	Front	Behind
Suspension	Telescopic, inverted type	Swinger, Pro-link
Brake	Front	Behind
Brake	Single disc 296 mm, with 4-piston caliper	Single disc 186 mm, with single piston caliper
Tire size	Front	Behind
Tire size	95/75 R17	115/75 R17

== Winners by season ==
Year	Rider	Pts
2014	(Japan) Kaito Toba	155
2015	(Japan) Ayumu Sasaki	203
2016	(Thailand) Somkiat Chantra	178
2017	(Turkey) Deniz Öncü	156
2018	(Australia) Bill van Eerde	199
2019	(Japan) Sho Nishimura	177
2020	Season cancelled due to COVID-19 pandemic	
2021	(Japan) Taiyo Furusato	175
2022	(Malaysia) Hakim Danish	187
2023	(Indonesia) Veda Pratama	256
2024	(Japan) Zen Mitani	259
2025	(Japan) Ryota Ogiwara	250
2026	(Japan) Hayato Chishiki	170
