= Shota Ite =

Japanese motorcycle racer (born 2002)

Shota Ite 井手 翔太
- Born: 26 February 2002 (age 24); Higashiosaka, Osaka, Japan
- Nationality: Japanese
- Current team: Akeno Speed
- Bike number: 4
Statistics
All Japan ST1000
Active years	2024–
Championships	0
Manufacturer	Yamaha (2024–)
Last season (2026)	5th (59 pts)
Starts / Wins / Podiums / Poles / F. laps / Points; 17 / 2 / 2 / 0 / 1 / 175.5
All Japan ST600
Active years	2020–2023
Championships	0
Manufacturer	Yamaha
Best season (2023)	3rd (77 pts)
Starts / Wins / Podiums / Poles / F. laps / Points; 23 / 3 / 5 / 0 / 1 / 213
All Japan J-GP2
Active years	2018–2019
Championships	0
Manufacturer	Yamaha
Best season (2019)	10th (64 pts)
Starts / Wins / Podiums / Poles / F. laps / Points; 11 / 0 / 0 / 0 / 0 / 83
All Japan JP250
Active years	2016–2017
Championships	0
Manufacturer	Yamaha
Best season (2017)	9th (32 pts)
Starts / Wins / Podiums / Poles / F. laps / Points; 7 / 0 / 0 / 0 / 0 / 42

Shota Ite (Japanese: 井手 翔太, Hepburn: Ite Shōta; born 26 February 2002) is a Japanese motorcycle racer who competes in the ST1000 class of the All Japan Road Race Championship for Akeno Speed.

Ite was part of Valentino Rossi's Yamaha Master Camp project in 2017. He has competed in the Asia Road Racing Championship as a wildcard in 2016, 2017, 2023 and 2025. He has also competed in the Suzuka 8 Hours since 2022, finishing runner-up in the Superstock class on his debut.

== Early and personal life ==
A native of Higashiōsaka, Japan, Ite began riding motorcycles aged nine, in competitions like the Daijiro Cup, and later the NSF100. His father Toshio is a former All Japan Road Race Championship 125cc rider, who competed in the 2000s and won several races, and influenced his son to take up racing.

Ite works part-time at Shinens Co., Ltd., one of his sponsors.

== Career ==
=== All Japan Road Race Championship ===
==== JP250 (2016–2017) ====
Ite entered his first All Japan Road Race Championship race in 2016, aged 14. He debuted in the penultimate round of the JP250 class, at Okayama with Akira Ryo's RC Koshien team. He qualified in 11th place but crashed out during the race. Ite participated in the final round at Suzuka, where he finished in sixth place within the domestic licensed class and 12th overall. Ite entered the 2017 JP250 season as a full-time rider, this time under an international license. During the opening race at Motegi, he finished as eighth-best of his class. He clinched his best JP250 result in the fourth round at Okayama, after finishing in fourth place. Ite closed the season with a fifth place at Suzuka, and finished ninth best in the international class overall.

==== Yamaha VR46 Master Camp ====
In May 2017, Ite was invited to Valentino Rossi's ranch as part of the Yamaha VR46 Master Camp project, aimed at developing young riders from different parts of the world. He spent five days in Italy, where he was coached by Yamaha figures such as Lin Jarvis and Rossi himself. He rode dirt bikes as well as road bikes, together with the other invitees.

==== J-GP2 (2018–2019) ====
For 2018, Ite made the jump to the prototype J-GP2 category, with his JP250 team. He finished 15th in his debut race at Motegi, which would be his best result all season. During the Okayama round, Ite qualified in 15th place but the race was cancelled due to the approach of a typhoon, and half points were awarded to the riders based on the qualifying positions. Ite remained in J-GP2 for a second year, where he improved his results from 2018, although with a smaller grid overall. His best result was a seventh place at Autopolis, and he finished in ninth place overall.

==== ST600 (2020–2023) ====
Following two years in the J-GP2 class—now defunct—Ite moved to ST600 with Akeno Speed for 2020, aboard a Yamaha YZF-R6. In a tighter than usual calendar due to the COVID pandemic, Ite participated in four races in total, with his best result being ninth at Motegi. He finished 11th in the championship standings in his rookie season. In 2021, Ite improved his 2020 best result in the category, with two fourth places at Okayama and Autopolis. He also topped a test at Okayama, but his season was burdened by retirements. Ite clinched his maiden podium following a third place at Sugo, followed by another third place at Autopolis, where he led the race for many laps but ultimately finished third in a final lap battle with Kohta Arakawa and Keito Abe. Ite closed the season with his maiden win at the Suzuka Circuit, after pulling away from Tomoyoshi Koyama and Yuki Kunii. He finished in fourth place overall.

In 2023, Ite faced his fourth and final year in ST600. He won the opening round at Motegi in front of Keito Abe and Kohki Suzuki, which put him in the championship lead for the first time in his career. Throughout the season he picked up top-five finishes but also two retirements which set him back in the standings. He won the closing round at Suzuka for a second year, and finished in third place in the championship standings. In the off-season—amid category changes—Ite got to try the superbike-spec Yamaha YZF-R1, in an event organized by Yamaha.

==== ST1000 (2024–present) ====
Ite stepped up to the ST1000 class with Akeno Speed for 2024. He finished eighth in the opening round, and would manage a best finish of fourth in the final round at Suzuka. He placed sixth in the championship standings. In 2025—in the 59th MFJ Grand Prix at Suzuka—Ite clinched his maiden ST1000 victory, in wet conditions in front of Kohta Arakawa and Taiga Hada.

During the pre-season in 2026, Ite took part in a Yamaha event where he acted as a coach to younger riders from the JP-Sport class, formerly known as JP250, a category he competed in between 2016 and 2017. In his third year in ST1000, Ite finished in fourth place in the opening round at Sugo, and clinched his second career ST1000 win in the rain at Motegi, only a few months after his maiden win at Suzuka.

=== Asia Road Racing Championship ===
Ite has competed as a wildcard in three classes of the Asia Road Racing Championship. In 2016 and 2017 he entered the Suzuka rounds of the AP250 class, aboard a similar bike to the one he raced in JP250. He managed to score points in his second attempt in 2017, following a 14th place. In 2023, he entered the Sugo round in the Supersport 600 class, and finished eighth in Race 2 following a fall in the first one.

In 2025, Ite entered the Motegi round of the Asian championship, this time in the ASB1000 class—aboard an R1 similar to the one he used in ST1000. Following a crash in Race 1 when he was running sixth, Ite picked up the bike and rejoined to finish 13th. He then finished seventh in Race 2 on Sunday. Ite returned in 2026 with his second ASB1000 appearance at Motegi, this time clinching third place in Race 1, making it his first podium finish in the championship. He would then finish fourth in the following day's race.

=== Suzuka 8 Hours ===
In 2021, Ite participated in the Suzuka 8 Hours entry tryout race held at the circuit in May, which determined which riders were allowed to participate in the endurance event. In his first attempt to qualify for the race, Ite won the tryout race in the rain from 19th on the grid, which earned him a spot in the 8 Hours. However, due to the ongoing COVID pandemic, the event was later cancelled.

For the 2022 Suzuka 8 Hours, Ite entered the event with NCXX Racing—run by Tetsuya Harada. Alongside Yuki Ito and Soichiro Minamimoto, the team were able to finish as runners-up of the Superstock class in Ite's debut year in the 8 Hours.

In the following years, Ite and his team had inconsistent results, with 2025 being his second best after 2022—finishing tenth in the superstock class. He has additionally shared motorcycle with Yuta Date, Yosuke Nakayama, Rei Toshima and Ren Okabe.

== Career statistics ==
=== All Japan Road Race Championship ===
==== Races by year ====
(key) (Races in bold indicate pole position; races in italics indicate fastest lap. Superscript numbers indicate overall results, including both national and international classes.)

Year	Class	Bike	1	2	3	4	5	6	7	Pos	Pts
2016	JP250 (Note: National class.)	Yamaha	TSU	AUT	SUG	MOT	OKA; Ret	SUZ; 6^{12}		20th	10
2017	JP250 (Note: International class.)	Yamaha	TSU; 8^{14}	SUG	MOT; 9^{23}	OKA1; 4^{7}	OKA2; Ret	SUZ; 5^{8}		9th	32
2018	J-GP2	Yamaha	MOT; 15	SUG; DNS	TSU1; Ret	TSU2; 18	AUT; Ret	OKA; 15‡	SUZ; 17	19th	19
2019	J-GP2	Yamaha	MOT; 9	SUG; Ret	TSU1; 10	TSU2; 9	OKA; DNS	AUT; 7	SUZ; 9	10th	64
2020	ST600	Yamaha	SUG; Ret	OKA; C	AUT; 11	MOT; 9	SUZ; 11			11th	35
2021	ST600	Yamaha	MOT; Ret	SUG; 10	TSU1; Ret	TSU2; 16	SUZ; 29†	OKA; 4	AUT; 4	12th	32
2022	ST600	Yamaha	MOT; 7	SUG1; Ret	SUG2; 3	AUT; 3	OKA; Ret	SUZ; 1		4th	69
2023	ST600	Yamaha	MOT; 1	SUG1; 5	SUG2; Ret	AUT; 4	OKA; Ret	SUZ; 1		3rd	77
2024	ST1000	Yamaha	MOT; 8	SUG; Ret	AUT1; 6	AUT2; 5	OKA; 6	SUZ; 4		6th	55
2025	ST1000	Yamaha	SUG; 5	MOT1; Ret	MOT2; 7	AUT; 15‡	OKA; 4	SUZ; 1		4th	61.5
2026	ST1000	Yamaha	SUG; 4	AUT; Ret	MOT1; 1	MOT2; 5	OKA; 6	SUZ; Ret		5th	59

- † – Rider did not finish the race, but was classified as he completed more than ~75% of the race distance.
- ‡ – Half points were awarded based on the qualifying results.

=== Asia Road Racing Championship ===
==== Races by year ====
(key) (Races in bold indicate pole position; races in italics indicate fastest lap)

Year	Class	Bike	1		2		3		4		5		6		Pos	Pts
Year	Class	Bike	R1	R2	R1	R2	R1	R2	R1	R2	R1	R2	R1	R2	Pos	Pts
2016	AP250	Yamaha	JOH	JOH	BUR	BUR	SUZ; 17	SUZ; 21	SEN	SEN	BUD	BUD	BUR	BUR	40th	0
2017	AP250	Yamaha	JOH	JOH	BUR	BUR	SUZ; 14	SUZ; 20	SEN	SEN	MAD	MAD	BUR	BUR	28th	2
2023	SS600	Yamaha	BUR	BUR	SEP	SEP	SUG; Ret	SUG; 8	MAN	MAN	ZHU	ZHU	BUR	BUR	24th	8
2025	ASB1000	Yamaha	BUR	BUR	SEP	SEP	MOT; 13	MOT; 7	MAN	MAN	SEP	SEP	BUR	BUR	19th	12
2026	ASB1000	Yamaha	SEP	SEP	BUR	BUR	MOT; 3	MOT; 4	MAN	MAN	SEP	SEP	BUR	BUR	11th*	29*

* Season still in progress.

=== Suzuka 8 Hours ===
Year	Class	Team	Co-riders	Bike	Pos
2022	**SST**	(Japan) NCXX Racing with Riders Club	(Japan) Yuki Ito (Japan) Soichiro Minamimoto	Yamaha YZF-R1	2nd
2023	**NSTK**	(Japan) Akeno Speed	(Japan) Soichiro Minamimoto (Japan) Yuta Date	Yamaha YZF-R1	14th
2024	**SST**	(Japan) NCXX Racing with Riders Club	(Japan) Yuta Date (Japan) Yosuke Nakayama	Yamaha YZF-R1	DSQ
2025	**SST**	(Japan) NCXX Racing with Riders Club	(Japan) Rei Toshima (Japan) Ren Okabe	Yamaha YZF-R1	10th
2026	**EWC**	(Japan) Team BabyFace Titanium Power	(Japan) Kazuma Tsuda (Japan) Rei Matsuoka	Yamaha YZF-R1	Ret
