= 2024 All Japan Road Race Championship =

Motorcycle road racing season

The 2024 MFJ All Japan Road Race Championship (Japanese: 2024 MFJ全日本ロードレース選手権シリーズ, Hepburn: 2024 MFJ Zen Nihon Rōdo Rēsu Senshuken Shirīzu) was the 58th MFJ Road Race season of the All Japan Road Race Championship since the series-format started, and the 63rd consecutive year since the first All Japan race was held after the MFJ was established. The season began at Suzuka on 9 March, and concluded on 27 October at the 56th MFJ Grand Prix at Suzuka Circuit.

ST600 rider Ryota Haga was killed during the Autopolis race.

Yuki Okamoto, Yuki Kunii, Keito Abe and Hiroki Ono were the JSB1000, ST1000, ST600 and J-GP3 champions, respectively.

== Calendar ==
The updated calendar was released on 21 November 2023.

Round	Circuit	Location	Date	Class	Map of circuit locations
1	Suzuka Circuit	(Mie Prefecture) Suzuka, Mie	9–10 March	JSB1000 (Note: The race served as a support race to the 2024 Super Formula Championship round.)	2024 All Japan Road Race Championship is located in Japan
2	Mobility Resort Motegi	(Tochigi Prefecture) Motegi, Tochigi	13–14 April	JSB1000†, ST1000, ST600, J-GP3	2024 All Japan Road Race Championship is located in Japan
3	Sportsland Sugo	(Miyagi Prefecture) Murata, Miyagi	25–26 May	JSB1000†, ST1000, ST600†, J-GP3	2024 All Japan Road Race Championship is located in Japan
4	Tsukuba Circuit	(Ibaraki Prefecture) Shimotsuma, Ibaraki	16 June	J-GP3	2024 All Japan Road Race Championship is located in Japan
5	Mobility Resort Motegi	(Tochigi Prefecture) Motegi, Tochigi	24–25 August	JSB1000	2024 All Japan Road Race Championship is located in Japan
6	Autopolis	(Ōita Prefecture) Hita, Ōita	7–8 September	JSB1000†, ST1000†, ST600, J-GP3	2024 All Japan Road Race Championship is located in Japan
7	Okayama International Circuit	(Okayama Prefecture) Mimasaka, Okayama	28–29 September	JSB1000, ST1000, ST600, J-GP3	2024 All Japan Road Race Championship is located in Japan
8	Suzuka Circuit	(Mie Prefecture) Suzuka, Mie	26–27 October	JSB1000†, ST1000, ST600, J-GP3	2024 All Japan Road Race Championship is located in Japan

- † – Double-header

== Race results ==
Round	Event	J-GP3 winner	ST600 winner	ST1000 winner	JSB1000 winner
1	(Mie Prefecture) Suzuka 2&4 Race				(Japan) Katsuyuki Nakasuga
2	(Tochigi Prefecture) Superbike Race at Motegi	(Japan) Rei Wakamatsu	(Japan) Keito Abe	(Japan) Yuki Kunii	(Japan) Katsuyuki Nakasuga
2	(Tochigi Prefecture) Superbike Race at Motegi	(Japan) Rei Wakamatsu	(Japan) Keito Abe	(Japan) Yuki Kunii	(Japan) Katsuyuki Nakasuga
3	(Miyagi Prefecture) Superbike Race at Sugo	(Japan) Hiroki Ono	(Japan) Keito Abe	(Japan) Yuki Kunii	(Japan) Katsuyuki Nakasuga
3	(Miyagi Prefecture) Superbike Race at Sugo	(Japan) Hiroki Ono	(Japan) Keito Abe	(Japan) Yuki Kunii	(Japan) Yuki Okamoto
4	(Ibaraki Prefecture) Tsukuba Round	(Japan) Hiroki Ono			
5	(Tochigi Prefecture) Motegi 2&4 Race				(Japan) Ryo Mizuno
6	(Ōita Prefecture) Superbike Race in Kyushu	(Japan) Hiroki Ono	(Japan) Keito Abe	(Japan) Taiga Hada	(Japan) Yuki Okamoto
6	(Ōita Prefecture) Superbike Race in Kyushu	(Japan) Hiroki Ono	(Japan) Keito Abe	(Japan) Yuki Kunii	(Japan) Yuki Okamoto
7	(Okayama Prefecture) Superbike Race at Okayama	(Japan) Rei Wakamatsu	(Japan) Keito Abe	(Japan) Yuki Kunii	(Japan) Yuki Okamoto
8	(Mie Prefecture) 56th MFJ Grand Prix at Suzuka	(Japan) Hiroki Ono	(Japan) Yuta Date	(Japan) Yuki Kunii	(Japan) Ryo Mizuno
8	(Mie Prefecture) 56th MFJ Grand Prix at Suzuka	(Japan) Hiroki Ono	(Japan) Yuta Date	(Japan) Yuki Kunii	(Japan) Ryo Mizuno

== Teams and riders ==
=== JSB1000 participants ===
Team	Constructor	Motorcycle	Tyre	No.	Rider	Rounds
(Japan) Team Tatara Aprilia	Aprilia	RSV4 1100 Factory	B	22	(Japan) Masahiro Shinjo	1–3, 6–8
(Japan) Sanmei Team Taro Plusone	BMW	M1000RR	B	12	(Japan) Taro Sekiguchi	1–3, 5–8
(Japan) Tone RT Syncedge4413 BMW	BMW	M1000RR	D	21	(Japan) Tomoya Hoshino	1–3, 5–8
(Japan) Tone RT Syncedge4413 BMW	BMW	M1000RR	D	37	(Japan) Ainosuke Yoshida	1, 5
(Japan) Tone RT Syncedge4413 BMW	BMW	M1000RR	D	38	(United States) Zechariah Dzegede	1
(Japan) Ducati Team Kagayama	Ducati	Panigale V4 R	B	3	(Japan) Ryo Mizuno	1–3, 5–8
(Japan) Astemo Honda Dream SI Racing	Honda	CBR1000RR-R	B	32	(Japan) Kohta Nozane	1–3, 5–8
(Japan) Astemo Honda Dream SI Racing	Honda	CBR1000RR-R	B	36	(Japan) Kazuma Watanabe	1
(Japan) Honda Dream RT Sakurai	Honda	CBR1000RR-R	B	9	(Japan) Kazuki Ito	1–3, 5–8
(Japan) Honda Dream RT Sakurai	Honda	CBR1000RR-R	B	20	(Japan) Daijiro Hiura	1, 8
(Japan) Honda Suzuka Racing Team	Honda	CBR1000RR-R	B	17	(Japan) Yuki Sugiyama	1–3, 5–8
(Japan) Honda Suzuka Racing Team	Honda	CBR1000RR-R	B	5	(Japan) Yudai Kamei	1
Japan Post Honda Dream TP	Honda	CBR1000RR-R	B	33	(Japan) Takumi Takahashi	1–3, 5–8
(Japan) Murayama Unso Team Akiyoshi	Honda	CBR1000RR-R	B	11	(Japan) Kousuke Akiyoshi	1–3, 5, 8
(Japan) Murayama Unso Team Akiyoshi	Honda	CBR1000RR-R	B	46	(Japan) Sho Hasegawa	7
(Japan) Team ATJ	Honda	CBR1000RR-R	B	10	(Japan) Satoru Iwata	1–3, 5–8
Team Sugai Racing Japan	Honda	CBR1000RR-R	B	29	(Japan) Yoshiyuki Sugai	1–3, 5–7
(Japan) Toho Racing	Honda	CBR1000RR-R	B	7	(Japan) Ryuichi Kiyonari	3, 5–8
(Japan) Toho Racing	Honda	CBR1000RR-R	B	35	(Japan) Kazuki Watanabe	1
(Japan) Toho Racing	Honda	CBR1000RR-R	B	40	(Japan) Ikuhiro Enokido	2
(Japan) SDG Honda Racing	Honda	CBR1000RR-R	B	4	(Japan) Teppei Nagoe	1–3, 5–8
(Japan) Team Agras	Honda	CBR1000RR-R	B	5	(Japan) Yudai Kamei	8
(Japan) Dunlop Racing Team with Yahagi	Honda	CBR1000RR-R	D	30	(Japan) Tetsuta Nagashima	1–3, 5–8
(Japan) Honda Soyukai Tochigi Racing	Honda	CBR1000RR-R	D	40	(Japan) Takafumi Kato	2
(Japan) Honda Blue Helmets MSC Kumamoto	Honda	CBR1000RR-R	D	45	(Japan) Hiromasa Okada	6
(Japan) KRP Sanyoukougyo RS-Itoh	Kawasaki	ZX-10R	B	31	(Japan) Yuto Sano	1–3, 5–8
(Japan) KRP Sanyoukougyo RS-Itoh	Kawasaki	ZX-10R	B	18	(Japan) Akira Yanagawa	6, 8
(Japan) Auto Race Ube Racing Team	Suzuki	GSX-R1000R	B	6	(Japan) Takuya Tsuda	1–3, 5–8
(Japan) Yoshimura SERT Motul	Suzuki	GSX-R1000R	B	13	(Japan) Cocoro Atsumi	1, 8
(Japan) Factory Hiro HLO	Suzuki	GSX-R1000R	B	44	(Japan) Kota Higuchi	6
(Japan) S-Sports	Suzuki	GSX-R1000R	B	47	(Japan) Hideyuki Ogata	7
(Japan) Yamaha Factory Racing Team	Yamaha	YZF-R1	B	1	(Japan) Katsuyuki Nakasuga	1–3, 5–8
(Japan) Yamaha Factory Racing Team	Yamaha	YZF-R1	B	2	(Japan) Yuki Okamoto	1–3, 5–8
(Japan) Nitro Racing	Yamaha	YZF-R1	B	28	(Japan) Akito Haga	1–3, 5–8
(Japan) Nitro Racing	Yamaha	YZF-R1	B	40	(Japan) Shota Yokoyama	5
(Japan) Nitro Racing	Yamaha	YZF-R1	B	41	(Japan) Ryota Haga	5
(Japan) Team Baby Face	Yamaha	YZF-R1	B	23	(Japan) Kazuma Tsuda	1–3, 5–8
(Japan) Team Kodama	Yamaha	YZF-R1	B	14	(Japan) Yuta Kodama	1–3, 5–8
(Japan) RSN	Yamaha	YZF-R1	D	27	(Japan) Shinichi Nakatomi	1–3, 5–8
(Japan) Taira Promote Racing	Yamaha	YZF-R1	D	34	(Japan) Yoshimasa Shibata	1–3, 7

Key
Regular rider
Replacement rider
Wildcard rider

=== ST1000 participants ===
Team	Constructor	Motorcycle	Tyre	No.	Rider	Rounds
(Japan) Team Tatara Aprilia	Aprilia	RSV4 1100 Factory	D	23	(Japan) Ruka Wada	2–3, 6–8
(Japan) Tone RT Syncedge4413 BMW	BMW	M1000RR	D	28	(Japan) Ainosuke Yoshida	2–3, 6–8
(Japan) Tone RT Syncedge4413 BMW	BMW	M1000RR	D	33	(United States) Zechariah Dzegede	2–3, 6–8
(Japan) Astemo Honda Dream SI Racing	Honda	CBR1000RR-R	D	30	(Japan) Kosuke Sakumoto	2–3, 6–8
(Japan) Astemo Honda Dream SI Racing	Honda	CBR1000RR-R	D	47	(Japan) Taiga Hada	6–8
(Japan) Moto Bum Honda	Honda	CBR1000RR-R	D	2	(Japan) Kohta Arakawa	2–3, 6–8
(Japan) Moto Bum Honda	Honda	CBR1000RR-R	D	21	(Japan) Yasuhiro Matsukawa	2–3, 6–8
(Japan) Moto Bum Honda	Honda	CBR1000RR-R	D	34	(Japan) Motoharu Ito	2–3, 6–8
(Japan) Toho Racing	Honda	CBR1000RR-R	D	3	(Japan) Takuma Kunimine	2–3, 6–8
(Japan) SDG Team Harc-Pro	Honda	CBR1000RR-R	D	10	(Japan) Yuki Kunii	2–3, 6–8
(Japan) Balz & Advance MC	Honda	CBR1000RR-R	D	36	(Japan) Jun Kikuchi	2, 8
(Japan) Club Next & Honda Dream	Honda	CBR1000RR-R	D	39	(Japan) Hikaru Yoshihiro	2
(Japan) Racing Team Seki	Honda	CBR1000RR-R	D	43	(Japan) Kazumasa Seki	3
(Japan) Honda Ryokuyokai Kumamoto Racing	Honda	CBR1000RR-R	D	20	(Japan) Kazuhiro Kojima	6
(Japan) Honda Ryokuyokai Kumamoto Racing	Honda	CBR1000RR-R	D	22	(Japan) Mitsuhiro Yoshida	6, 8
(Japan) Team Izumi	Honda	CBR1000RR-R	D	49	(Japan) Takashi Arase	6
(Japan) Okinawa S-Pal Bike Club	Honda	CBR1000RR-R	D	51	(Japan) Hidenari Ikeda	6
RT Japan M Auto	Honda	CBR1000RR-R	D	53	(Japan) Tsukasa Murata	7
(Japan) Team Bizenseiki	Honda	CBR1000RR-R	D	54	(Japan) Masaki Yamanaka	7–8
(Japan) Edwin Gesundheit Racing	Honda	CBR1000RR-R	D	57	(Japan) Hinata Nakajima	8
(Japan) Kawasaki Plaza Racing Team	Kawasaki	ZX-10R	D	9	(Japan) Ryosuke Iwato	2–3, 6–8
(Japan) Kawasaki Plaza Racing Team	Kawasaki	ZX-10R	D	32	(Japan) Gun Mie	2–3, 6–8
(Japan) Matsuba Racing RS Itoh	Kawasaki	ZX-10R	D	13	(Japan) Tatsuya Nakamura	2–3, 6–8
(Japan) Yamashina Kawasaki Ken Racing	Kawasaki	ZX-10R	D	24	(Japan) Yuya Kabetani	6
(Japan) Himeji Kawasaki Racing Team	Kawasaki	ZX-10R	D	56	(Japan) Kazuo Nakanishi	7
(Japan) Team Titan TKR Suzuki	Suzuki	GSX-R1000R	D	11	(Japan) Takeru Murase	2–3, 6–8
(Japan) A-Garage Project Fate	Suzuki	GSX-R1000R	D	41	(Japan) Yasunori Yamazoe	2
(Japan) Akeno Speed	Yamaha	YZF-R1	D	31	(Japan) Shota Ite	2–3, 6–8
(Japan) Dogfight Racing JDS	Yamaha	YZF-R1	D	7	(Japan) Rei Toshima	2–3, 6–8
(Japan) Fudosan Shigeki	Yamaha	YZF-R1	D	35	(Japan) Naoyuki Sato	2–3, 6–8
(Japan) Hisa31 with R-in Spirits	Yamaha	YZF-R1	D	29	(Japan) Hisami Arai	2–3, 6–7
(Japan) Nitro Racing	Yamaha	YZF-R1	D	12	(Japan) Shota Yokoyama	2–3, 6–8
(Japan) 113 ENAC racing	Yamaha	YZF-R1	D	44	(Japan) Masaaki Takada	3
(Japan) Ride In	Yamaha	YZF-R1	D	45	(Japan) Takashi Sakamoto	3
(Japan) RT Morinokumasan	Yamaha	YZF-R1	D	46	(Japan) Yuki Watabe	3
(Japan) Squadra Tigre Taira Promote	Yamaha	YZF-R1	D	48	(Japan) Sho Nishimura	6–7
(Japan) Team GYTR	Yamaha	YZF-R1	D	8	(Japan) Keisuke Maeda	7
(Japan) Nichirin Racing	Yamaha	YZF-R1	D	25	(Japan) Masaki Adachi	7
(Japan) Team Technica	Yamaha	YZF-R1	D	27	(Japan) Yoshiyuki Hayashi	7
(Japan) West6 with T-Moto	Yamaha	YZF-R1	D	52	(Japan) Nobutaka Tanimoto	7
(Japan) Team Pure Cosmos	Yamaha	YZF-R1	D	55	(Japan) Kuniyasu Takeo	7

Key
Regular rider
Replacement rider
Wildcard rider

=== ST600 participants ===
Team	Constructor	Motorcycle	Tyre	No.	Rider	Rounds
(Japan) Battle Factory	Honda	CBR600RR	B	16	(Japan) Takuto Suzuki	2–3, 6–8
Japan Post Honda Dream TP	Honda	CBR600RR	B	5	(Japan) Tomoyoshi Koyama	2–3, 6–8
Japan Post Honda Dream TP	Honda	CBR600RR	B	27	(Japan) Syuu Yamato	2–3, 6–8
(Japan) Moto Bum Honda	Honda	CBR600RR	B	7	(Japan) Kohki Suzuki	2–3, 6–8
(Japan) Moto Bum Honda	Honda	CBR600RR	B	21	(Japan) Kai Aota	2–3, 6–8
(Japan) Moto Bum Honda	Honda	CBR600RR	B	26	(Japan) Kenichi Sakurai	2–3, 6–8
Japan M Auto RT and 24 Service	Honda	CBR600RR	B	32	(Japan) Yoshihiro Toyohara	2–3, 6–8
(Japan) SDG Team Harc-Pro	Honda	CBR600RR	B	30	(Japan) Kanta Hamada	2–3, 7–8
(Japan) SE Competition	Honda	CBR600RR	B	22	(Japan) Naoki Yamada	2
(Japan) SE Competition	Honda	CBR600RR	B	28	(Japan) Toshiki Senda	2–3, 6–8
(Japan) SE Competition	Honda	CBR600RR	B	44	(Japan) Takatsugu Sakai	3, 7–8
(Japan) TN45 with MotoUp Racing	Honda	CBR600RR	B	13	(Japan) Tetsuya Fujita	2–3, 6–8
(Japan) Wakobo Racing with Bistoro K	Honda	CBR600RR	B	34	(Japan) Ryuki Matsushita	2–3, 8
(Japan) Club Moto-Up with HD Adachi	Honda	CBR600RR	B	38	(Japan) Shuichiro Nakamura	2, 6
(Japan) Honda Blue Helmets MSC Kumamoto	Honda	CBR600RR	B	48	(Japan) Shogo Nishiyama	6
(Japan) K0 & Toho Racing Club	Honda	CBR600RR	B	50	(Japan) Anjyu Kasai	7–8
(Japan) Sum Techno Service	Honda	CBR600RR	B	54	(Japan) Takanori Kawamoto	7–8
(Japan) Speedtec Racing	Honda	CBR600RR	B	55	(Japan) Makoto Kobayashi	7
(Japan) Moto Win Racing	Honda	CBR600RR	B	57	(Japan) Keisuke Tsukahara	8
(Japan) Honda Suzuka Racing Team	Honda	CBR600RR	B	58	(Japan) Yousuke Ide	8
(Japan) Fireworks & Yokenshokunin RP	Kawasaki	ZX-6R	B	36	(Japan) Toshiro Miyawaki	2–3
(Japan) Team Bizenseiki	Kawasaki	ZX-6R	B	51	(Japan) Motonari Fujita	7
(Japan) Akeno Speed	Yamaha	YZF-R6	B	6	(Japan) Yuta Date	2–3, 6–8
(Japan) Akeno Speed	Yamaha	YZF-R6	B	29	(Japan) Sota Horii	3, 6–8
(Japan) Fujimoto Denki GBS Racing	Yamaha	YZF-R6	B	17	(Japan) Ren Okabe	2–3, 6–8
(Japan) Fujimoto Denki GBS Racing	Yamaha	YZF-R6	B	31	(Japan) Keisuke Tanaka	2–3, 6–8
(Japan) Ito Racing Borg Custom	Yamaha	YZF-R6	B	9	(Japan) Yousuke Nakayama	2–3, 6–8
(Japan) Ito Racing Borg Custom	Yamaha	YZF-R6	B	12	(Japan) Rei Matsuoka	2–3, 6–8
(Japan) Nippon Pioneer Garage L8	Yamaha	YZF-R6	B	8	(Japan) Riku Sugawara	2–3, 6–8
(Japan) Nitro Racing	Yamaha	YZF-R6	B	10	(Japan) Ryota Haga	2–3, 6
(Japan) Nitro Racing	Yamaha	YZF-R6	B	39	(Japan) Yuta Okaya	2–3, 8
(Japan) Squadra Tigre Taira Promote	Yamaha	YZF-R6	B	1	(Japan) Keito Abe	2–3, 6–7
(Japan) Taira Promote Racing	Yamaha	YZF-R6	B	25	(Japan) Shinya Mikami	2–3, 8
(Japan) Teamkenken	Yamaha	YZF-R6	B	4	(Japan) Kengo Nagao	2–3, 6–8
(Japan) IXA Racing	Yamaha	YZF-R6	B	33	(Japan) Tatsuma Matsutani	2, 7
(Japan) M Factory RT Niwa Engineering	Yamaha	YZF-R6	B	35	(Japan) Takahiro Niwa	2, 8
(Japan) Team Kou with Flash	Yamaha	YZF-R6	B	37	(Japan) Kou Yamamoto	2
(Japan) Team RSR Hokkaido	Yamaha	YZF-R6	B	40	(Japan) Takaya Kodama	3
(Japan) Gitrax RSR Miura Pump Center	Yamaha	YZF-R6	B	41	(Japan) Hirofumi Kajita	3
(Japan) Team t2y Toho	Yamaha	YZF-R6	B	18	(Japan) Tatsuya Yamaguchi	6–7
(Japan) Shake Wako's Ukaretei	Yamaha	YZF-R6	B	45	(Japan) Yuji Arita	6
(Japan) Nakayama Seimitu	Yamaha	YZF-R6	B	46	(Japan) Hikaru Akiyoshi	6
(Japan) 4ing RT Motul	Yamaha	YZF-R6	B	47	(Japan) Azusa Nomura	6
(Japan) Green Sports RT	Yamaha	YZF-R6	B	52	(Japan) Shinji Oonaka	7
(Japan) Speedtec KBS with J-Trip	Yamaha	YZF-R6	B	53	(Japan) Taichi Honda	7
(Japan) TT45	Yamaha	YZF-R6	B	56	(Japan) Riki Hamano	7

Key
Regular rider
Replacement rider
Wildcard rider

=== J-GP3 participants ===
Team	Constructor	Motorcycle	Tyre	No.	Rider	Rounds
(Japan) Breasto B-Tribe Racing	Honda	NSF250R	B	7	(Japan) Riku Matsushima	2–4, 6–8
Japan Post docomo business TP; Japan Post Honda Dream TP	Honda	NSF250R	B	3	(Japan) Rei Wakamatsu	2–4, 6–8
Japan Post docomo business TP; Japan Post Honda Dream TP	Honda	NSF250R	B	12	(Japan) Shizuka Okazaki	2–4, 6–8
(Japan) Marumae Dream Kitakyushu	Honda	NSF250R	B	13	(Japan) Hayato Oota	2–4, 6–8
(Japan) Marumae MTR	Honda	NSF250R	B	10	(Japan) Masaki Tokudome	2–4, 6–8
(Japan) Nozawa Racing Family	Honda	NSF250R	B	22	(Japan) Hidenori Nozawa	2–4, 7–8
(Japan) Team Plusone	Honda	NSF250R	B	4	(Japan) Shota Kiuchi	2–4, 6–8
(Japan) Team Deshi with RG Niwa	Honda	NSF250R	B	34	(Japan) Norihiko Murata	2, 6, 8
(Japan) Team Shun and Zero	Honda	NSF250R	B	11	(Japan) Shun Takenaka	4, 8
(Japan) Taira Promote Jr.	Honda	NSF250R	B	36	(Japan) Yosuke Hosaka	6–8
(Japan) Plan Bee Racing RSC	Honda	NSF250R	B	37	(Japan) Arata Irimoto	6
(Japan) Flex Racing Team & MH Ohara	Honda	NSF250R	B	38	(Japan) Keiichi Kishida	7
(Japan) Rairaku Kikaku with RG Niwa	Honda	NSF250R	B	39	(Japan) Hiroshi Kaneko	7
(Japan) Battle Factory	Honda	NSF250R	D	29	(Japan) Tesshin Toyoda	2–4, 6–8
(Japan) Battle Factory	Honda	NSF250R	P	33	(Japan) Rintaro Takemoto	2–4, 6
(Japan) Battle Factory	Honda	NSF250R	D	–	(Japan) Kakeru Endo	4, 8
(Japan) P.MU 7C Galespeed	Honda	NSF250R	D	1	(Japan) Hiroki Ono	2–4, 6–8
(Japan) P.MU 7C Galespeed	Honda	NSF250R	D	25	(Japan) Sho Tokuda	2–4, 6–8
(Japan) P.MU 7C Galespeed	Honda	NSF250R	D	18	(Japan) Zen Mitani	3–4
(Japan) Team Hiro	Honda	NSF250R	D	30	(Japan) Motonari Matsuda	2–4, 6–8
(Japan) Team Kohsaka	Honda	NSF250R	D	24	(Japan) Takuto Sumi	2–4, 6–8
(Japan) Team Life Honda Dream	Honda	NSF250R	D	19	(Japan) Yasuhiro Yamamoto	2–4, 6–8
(Japan) Kijima Kiss Racing Club	Honda	NSF250R	D	31	(Japan) Shingo Iidaka	2–4, 6–8
(Japan) Inuno Nyusankin Primitive RT	Honda	NSF250R	D	40	(Japan) Eito Nakamura	8
(Japan) Team Kota	Honda	NSF250R	D	–	(Japan) Kota Iwano	7
(Japan) Team Power Craft Ak1teck	Honda	NSF250R	D	–	(Japan) Soma Hasegawa	7–8
(Japan) DH Alpaca Racing	Honda	NSF250R	D	–	(Japan) Daijiro Hario	8
(Japan) 56Racing	Honda	NSF250R	D	–	(Japan) Kotaro Togashi	8
(Japan) Team HRS	Honda	NSF250R	D	–	(Japan) Rintaro Todaka	8
(Japan) TN45 with MotoUp Racing	Honda	NSF250R	D	28	(Japan) Kenshin Nakatani	2–3, 6–8
(Japan) TN45 with MotoUp Racing	Honda	NSF250R	D	–	(Japan) Haruki Matsuyama	2–4
(Japan) TN45 with MotoUp Racing	Honda	NSF250R	P	35	(Japan) Seiryu Ikegami	4
(Japan) Astemo Honda Dream SI Racing	Honda	NSF250R	P	26	(Thailand) Burapa Wanmoon	2–4, 6
(Japan) Astemo Honda Dream SI Racing	Honda	NSF250R	P	27	(Thailand) Thanachat Pratumtong	2–4, 6
(Japan) WJ Factory	Honda	NSF250R	P	32	(Japan) Ryota Ogiwara	2, 4
(Japan) WJ Factory	Honda	NSF250R	P	23	(Japan) Fugo Tanaka	3
(Japan) Team Naoko KTM	KTM	RC250R	B	5	(Japan) Naoko Takasugi	2–4, 6–8

Key
Regular rider
S-class rider (Note: Special Participation (特別参加枠) riders, typically aged 12–18 with domestic or junior licenses, may compete in select rounds by invitation but are ineligible for points or prizes, even if they finish in point-scoring positions.)
Replacement rider
Wildcard rider

== Championship standings ==
Scoring system

Points are awarded to the top fifteen finishers. A rider has to finish the race to earn points. The same point system is used across the four classes. Three extra-points were awarded in the final round at the 56th MFJ Grand Prix at Suzuka Circuit.

Position	1st	2nd	3rd	4th	5th	6th	7th	8th	9th	10th	11th	12th	13th	14th	15th
Points (Rd. 1–7)	25	20	16	13	11	10	9	8	7	6	5	4	3	2	1
Points (Rd. 8)	28	23	19	16	14	13	12	11	10	9	8	7	6	5	4

=== Riders' standings ===
==== JSB1000 ====
Pos.	Rider	Bike	SUZ (Mie Prefecture)	MOT (Tochigi Prefecture)		SUG (Miyagi Prefecture)		MOT (Tochigi Prefecture)	AUT (Ōita Prefecture)		OKA (Okayama Prefecture)	SUZ (Mie Prefecture)		Pts
Pos.	Rider	Bike	SUZ (Mie Prefecture)	R1	R2	R1	R2	MOT (Tochigi Prefecture)	R1	R2	OKA (Okayama Prefecture)	R1	R2	Pts
1	(Japan) Yuki Okamoto	Yamaha	3	3	2^{F}	2^{P F}	1^{P}	3	1^{F}	1^{P F}	1^{P F}	2^{P}	3^{P}	230
2	(Japan) Katsuyuki Nakasuga	Yamaha	1^{F}	1^{P F}	1	1	3	2	2^{P}	2	3	3^{F}	16†	211
3	(Japan) Ryo Mizuno	Ducati	2	2	3^{P}	3	2^{F}	1^{P F}	3	20	2	1	1^{F}	209
4	(Japan) Kohta Nozane	Honda	7	4	5	4	4	4	4	4	4	4	2	150
5	(Japan) Takumi Takahashi	Honda	5	8	7	7	5	6	5	3	9	6	4	121
6	(Japan) Teppei Nagoe	Honda	11	7	8	6	8	7	6	16	8	9	7	89
7	(Japan) Takuya Tsuda	Suzuki	6	5	4	9	9	5	8	6	5	Ret	DNS	88
8	(Japan) Satoru Iwata	Honda	8	9	10	8	6	Ret	9	5	6	5	Ret	81
9	(Japan) Kazuki Ito	Honda	10	11	9	5	7	DSQ	7	8	7	7	Ret	76
10	(Japan) Tetsuta Nagashima	Honda	4^{P}	6	6	10	10	Ret	Ret	7	10	11	Ret	68
11	(Japan) Taro Sekiguchi	BMW	Ret	15	12	12	12	8	10	11	11	12	8	55
12	(Japan) Ryuichi Kiyonari	Honda				11	11	10	17	12	12	13	11	38
13	(Japan) Yuta Kodama	Yamaha	DSQ	18	14	15	13	9	11	9	13	14	Ret	33
14	(Japan) Daijiro Hiura	Honda	9									10	6	29
15	(Japan) Yuto Sano	Kawasaki	16	16	13	18	14	18†	12	10	14	Ret	10	26
16	(Japan) Cocoro Atsumi	Suzuki	22†									8	5	25
17	(Japan) Yuki Sugiyama	Honda	18	13	Ret	16	15	14	13	13	21	16	12	19
18	(Japan) Yudai Kamei	Honda	12									15	9	18
19	(Japan) Kousuke Akiyoshi	Honda	Ret	12	Ret	17	18	11				17	13	15
20	(Japan) Kazuma Tsuda	Yamaha	23†	17	11	13	21	12	16	17	17	Ret	DNS	12
21	(Japan) Akira Yanagawa	Kawasaki							14	15		19	14	8
22	(Japan) Ikuhiro Enokido	Honda		10	Ret									6
23	(Japan) Shinichi Nakatomi	Yamaha	14	21	19†	20	17	13	Ret	19	15	20	Ret	6
24	(Japan) Tomoya Hoshino	BMW	Ret	14	15	19	16	Ret	15	14	Ret	18	Ret	6
25	(Japan) Masahiro Shinjo	Aprilia	17	19	Ret	Ret	19		18	18	Ret	Ret	15	4
26	(Japan) Kazuma Watanabe	Honda	13											3
27	(Japan) Akito Haga	Yamaha	15	20	16	14	Ret	Ret	21	DNS	19	21	Ret	3
28	(Japan) Ainosuke Yoshida	BMW	19					15						1
29	(Japan) Sho Hasegawa	Honda									16			0
30	(Japan) Shota Yokoyama	Yamaha						16						0
31	(Japan) Yoshiyuki Sugai	Honda	20	24	18	21	20	17	19	Ret	18			0
32	(Japan) Takafumi Kato	Honda		23	17									0
33	(Japan) Hideyuki Ogata	Suzuki									20			0
34	(Japan) Kota Higuchi	Suzuki							20	21				0
35	(United States) Zechariah Dzegede	BMW	21											0
36	(Japan) Yoshimasa Shibata	Yamaha	Ret	22	Ret	Ret	DNS							0
	(Japan) Ryota Haga	Yamaha						Ret						0
	(Japan) Kazuki Watanabe	Honda	Ret											0
	(Japan) Hiromasa Okada	Honda							DNQ	DNQ				0

Colour	Result
Gold	Winner
Silver	Second place
Bronze	Third place
Green	Points classification
Blue	Non-points classification
Blue	Non-classified finish (NC)
Purple	Retired, not classified (Ret)
Red	Did not qualify (DNQ)
Red	Did not pre-qualify (DNPQ)
Black	Disqualified (DSQ)
White	Did not start (DNS)
White	Withdrew (WD)
White	Race cancelled (C)
Blank	Did not practice (DNP)
Blank	Did not arrive (DNA)
Blank	Excluded (EX)

P – Pole position
F – Fastest lap

Notes:

- † – Rider did not finish the race, but was classified as they completed more than 75% of the race distance.

==== ST1000 ====
Pos.	Rider	Bike	MOT (Tochigi Prefecture)	SUG (Miyagi Prefecture)	AUT (Ōita Prefecture)		OKA (Okayama Prefecture)	SUZ (Mie Prefecture)	Pts
Pos.	Rider	Bike	MOT (Tochigi Prefecture)	SUG (Miyagi Prefecture)	R1	R2	OKA (Okayama Prefecture)	SUZ (Mie Prefecture)	Pts
1	(Japan) Yuki Kunii	Honda	1^{P}	1^{F}	4	1^{F}	1^{P}	1^{P F}	141
2	(Japan) Ryosuke Iwato	Kawasaki	3	2^{P}	3^{F}	4	5	3	95
3	(Japan) Taiga Hada	Honda			1^{P}	2^{P}	2	2	88
4	(Japan) Takuma Kunimine	Honda	4	17†	2	3	3^{F}	Ret	65
5	(Japan) Kohta Arakawa	Honda	DSQ	3	5	7	4	5	63
6	(Japan) Shota Ite	Yamaha	8	Ret	6	5	6	4	55
7	(Japan) Rei Toshima	Yamaha	5	5	7	Ret	7	6	53
8	(Japan) Kosuke Sakumoto	Honda	2	20†	8	6	23†	9	48
9	(Japan) Motoharu Ito	Honda	6	4	11	9	8	18	43
10	(Japan) Ruka Wada	Aprilia	7	6	9	10	Ret	8	43
11	(Japan) Tatsuya Nakamura	Kawasaki	9	7	12	11	10	10	40
12	(Japan) Takeru Murase	Suzuki	Ret	Ret	10	8	9	7	33
13	(Japan) Shota Yokoyama	Yamaha	10	8	Ret	DNS	11	20†	19
14	(Japan) Ainosuke Yoshida	BMW	12	9	DNS	DNS	DSQ	14	16
15	(Japan) Yasuhiro Matsukawa	Honda	13	10	18	14	15	DNS	12
16	(Japan) Masaki Yamanaka	Honda					13	11	11
17	(Japan) Gun Mie	Kawasaki	19†	18†	15	20†	14	13	9
18	(Japan) Mitsuhiro Yoshida	Honda			14	13		15	9
19	(Japan) Hinata Nakajima	Honda						12	7
20	(Japan) Kazuhiro Kojima	Honda			13	12			7
21	(Japan) Yuki Watabe	Yamaha		11					5
22	(Japan) Hikaru Yoshihiro	Honda	11						5
23	(Japan) Sho Nishimura	Yamaha			Ret	DNS	12		4
24	(Japan) Masaaki Takada	Yamaha		12					4
25	(Japan) Kazumasa Seki	Honda		13					3
26	(Japan) Naoyuki Sato	Yamaha	15	14	19	18	18	19	3
27	(Japan) Jun Kikuchi	Honda	14					16	2
28	(Japan) Takashi Arase	Honda			16	15			1
29	(United States) Zechariah Dzegede	BMW	17	15	20	16	22†	17	1
30	(Japan) Nobutaka Tanimoto	Yamaha					16		0
31	(Japan) Takashi Sakamoto	Yamaha		16					0
32	(Japan) Yasunori Yamazoe	Suzuki	16						0
33	(Japan) Kuniyasu Takeo	Yamaha					17		0
34	(Japan) Yuya Kabetani	Kawasaki			17	17			0
35	(Japan) Hisami Arai	Yamaha	18	19†	DNQ	DNQ	19		0
36	(Japan) Hidenari Ikeda	Honda			21	19†			0
37	(Japan) Kazuo Nakanishi	Kawasaki					20		0
38	(Japan) Tsukasa Murata	Honda					21		0
	(Japan) Keisuke Maeda	Yamaha					Ret		0
	(Japan) Masaki Adachi	Yamaha					DNS		0
	(Japan) Yoshiyuki Hayashi	Yamaha					DNS		0

Colour	Result
Gold	Winner
Silver	Second place
Bronze	Third place
Green	Points classification
Blue	Non-points classification
Blue	Non-classified finish (NC)
Purple	Retired, not classified (Ret)
Red	Did not qualify (DNQ)
Red	Did not pre-qualify (DNPQ)
Black	Disqualified (DSQ)
White	Did not start (DNS)
White	Withdrew (WD)
White	Race cancelled (C)
Blank	Did not practice (DNP)
Blank	Did not arrive (DNA)
Blank	Excluded (EX)

P – Pole position
F – Fastest lap

Notes:

- † – Rider did not finish the race, but was classified as they completed more than 75% of the race distance.

==== ST600 ====
Pos.	Rider	Bike	MOT (Tochigi Prefecture)	SUG (Miyagi Prefecture)		AUT‡ (Ōita Prefecture)	OKA (Okayama Prefecture)	SUZ (Mie Prefecture)	Pts
Pos.	Rider	Bike	MOT (Tochigi Prefecture)	R1	R2	AUT‡ (Ōita Prefecture)	OKA (Okayama Prefecture)	SUZ (Mie Prefecture)	Pts
1	(Japan) Keito Abe	Yamaha	1^{P F}	1^{P}	1^{P}	1^{P}	1^{F}		112.5
2	(Japan) Kengo Nagao	Yamaha	2	2	2	3	3	3^{P}	103
3	(Japan) Yuta Date	Yamaha	3	5	4	2	2^{P}	1^{F}	98
4	(Japan) Kohki Suzuki	Honda	4	3^{F}	3^{F}	6	Ret	2	73
5	(Japan) Tetsuya Fujita	Honda	8	4	5	8	4	6	62
6	(Japan) Rei Matsuoka	Yamaha	10	7	8	10	6	4	52
7	(Japan) Riku Sugawara	Yamaha	6	6	7	12	22†	7	43
8	(Japan) Yousuke Nakayama	Yamaha	9	Ret	10	5	7	5	41.5
9	(Japan) Kai Aota	Honda	13	9	11	15	8	8	34.5
10	(Japan) Yuta Okaya	Yamaha	7	8	9			12	31
11	(Japan) Tomoyoshi Koyama	Honda	5	Ret	DNS	7	5	DNS	26.5
12	(Japan) Takuto Suzuki	Honda	11	10	12	13	21	11	24.5
13	(Japan) Toshiki Senda	Honda	12	12	Ret	11	Ret	9	20.5
14	(Japan) Ren Okabe	Yamaha	14	11	14	9	Ret	14	17.5
15	(Japan) Ryota Haga	Yamaha	Ret	Ret	6	4			16.5
16	(Japan) Keisuke Tanaka	Yamaha	Ret	13	13	17	10	15	16
17	(Japan) Syuu Yamato	Honda	Ret	23	17	18	11	10	14
18	(Japan) Tatsuya Yamaguchi	Yamaha				14	9		8
19	(Japan) Sota Horii	Yamaha		15	16	20	15	13	8
20	(Japan) Takanori Kawamoto	Honda					12	18	4
21	(Japan) Kanta Hamada	Honda	17	Ret	15		13	16	4
22	(Japan) Anjyu Kasai	Honda					14	22	2
23	(Japan) Ryuki Matsushita	Honda	Ret	14	Ret			20	2
24	(Japan) Shinya Mikami	Yamaha	15	16	18			21	1
25	(Japan) Taichi Honda	Yamaha					16		0
26	(Japan) Shuichiro Nakamura	Honda	23†			16			0
27	(Japan) Kou Yamamoto	Yamaha	16						0
28	(Japan) Keisuke Tsukahara	Honda						17	0
29	(Japan) Kenichi Sakurai	Honda	Ret	20	21	22	17	25	0
30	(Japan) Takatsugu Sakai	Honda		17	19			19	0
31	(Japan) Yoshihiro Toyohara	Honda	20	21	23	23	18	24	0
32	(Japan) Hirofumi Kajita	Yamaha		18	22				0
33	(Japan) Takahiro Niwa	Yamaha	18					Ret	0
34	(Japan) Tatsuma Matsutani	Yamaha	21				19		0
35	(Japan) Shogo Nishiyama	Honda				19			0
36	(Japan) Toshiro Miyawaki	Kawasaki	19	19	20				0
37	(Japan) Shinji Oonaka	Yamaha					20		0
38	(Japan) Hikaru Akiyoshi	Yamaha				21			0
39	(Japan) Takaya Kodama	Yamaha		22	24				0
40	(Japan) Naoki Yamada	Honda	22						0
41	(Japan) Yousuke Ide	Honda						23	0
42	(Japan) Azusa Nomura	Yamaha				24			0
43	(Japan) Yuji Arita	Yamaha				25			0
	(Japan) Riki Hamano	Yamaha					DNS		0
	(Japan) Makoto Kobayashi	Honda					DNQ		0
	(Japan) Motonari Fujita	Kawasaki					DNQ		0

Colour	Result
Gold	Winner
Silver	Second place
Bronze	Third place
Green	Points classification
Blue	Non-points classification
Blue	Non-classified finish (NC)
Purple	Retired, not classified (Ret)
Red	Did not qualify (DNQ)
Red	Did not pre-qualify (DNPQ)
Black	Disqualified (DSQ)
White	Did not start (DNS)
White	Withdrew (WD)
White	Race cancelled (C)
Blank	Did not practice (DNP)
Blank	Did not arrive (DNA)
Blank	Excluded (EX)

P – Pole position
F – Fastest lap

Notes:

- † – Rider did not finish the race, but was classified as they completed more than 75% of the race distance.
- ‡ – Ryota Haga was fatally injured during the Autopolis race, which was consequently abandoned. Half points were awarded based on the qualifying results.

==== J-GP3 ====
Pos.	Rider	Bike	MOT (Tochigi Prefecture)	SUG (Miyagi Prefecture)	TSU (Ibaraki Prefecture)	AUT (Ōita Prefecture)	OKA (Okayama Prefecture)	SUZ (Mie Prefecture)	Pts
1	(Japan) Hiroki Ono	Honda	4	1^{P}	1^{P}	1^{P F}	2^{F}	1	136
2	(Japan) Rei Wakamatsu	Honda	1	2	2	3	1^{F}	11^{P}	114
3	(Japan) Shota Kiuchi	Honda	2	3	10	2	3	2	101
4	(Japan) Shizuka Okazaki	Honda	6	8	11	5	6	3^{F}	63
5	(Japan) Naoko Takasugi	KTM	5^{F}	7	6	18	4	4	59
6	(Japan) Masaki Tokudome	Honda	14	5	12	4	7	5	53
7	(Japan) Riku Matsushima	Honda	Ret	10	5	7	5	8	48
8	(Japan) Hayato Oota	Honda	Ret	6	9	6	8	6	48
9	(Japan) Shingo Iidaka	Honda	8	12	15	12	10	12	30
10	(Japan) Shun Takenaka	Honda			3			7	28
11	(Japan) Kenshin Nakatani	Honda	Ret	DNS		8	9	9	25
12	(Japan) Ryota Ogiwara	FTR Honda	3^{P}		8				24
13	(Japan) Zen Mitani	Honda		4^{F}	7				22
14	(Japan) Yasuhiro Yamamoto	Honda	10	15	19	10	11	20	18
15	(Thailand) Thanachat Pratumtong	Honda	9	14	17	9			16
16	(Japan) Hidenori Nozawa	Honda	7	16	13		13	16	15
17	(Japan) Motonari Matsuda	Honda	11	20†	20	11	12	WD	14
18	(Japan) Seiryu Ikegami	Honda			4				13
19	(Japan) Eito Nakamura	Honda						10	9
20	(Japan) Fugo Tanaka	Honda		9					7
21	(Japan) Sho Tokuda	Honda	12	19	18	14	15	Ret	7
22	(Japan) Tesshin Toyoda	Honda	Ret	18	Ret	13	17	15	7
23	(Thailand) Burapa Wanmoon	Honda	Ret	11	16				5
24	(Japan) Norihiko Murata	Honda	13			15		22	4
25	(Japan) Rintaro Takemoto	Honda	Ret	13	Ret	Ret			3
26	(Japan) Takuto Sumi	Honda	15	17	21	16	19	23	1
27	(Japan) Arata Irimoto	Honda				17			0
28	(Japan) Keiichi Kishida	Honda					18		0
29	(Japan) Yosuke Hosaka	Honda				Ret		19	0
	(Japan) Hiroshi Kaneko	Honda					WD		0
Special Participation riders ineligible for points
	(Japan) Kotaro Togashi	Honda						13	
	(Japan) Rintaro Todaka	Honda						14	
	(Japan) Soma Hasegawa	Honda					14	17	
	(Japan) Haruki Matsuyama	Honda	Ret	Ret	14				
	(Japan) Kota Iwano	Honda					16		
	(Japan) Kakeru Endo	Honda			Ret			18	
	(Japan) Daijiro Hario	Honda						21	

Colour	Result
Gold	Winner
Silver	Second place
Bronze	Third place
Green	Points classification
Blue	Non-points classification
Blue	Non-classified finish (NC)
Purple	Retired, not classified (Ret)
Red	Did not qualify (DNQ)
Red	Did not pre-qualify (DNPQ)
Black	Disqualified (DSQ)
White	Did not start (DNS)
White	Withdrew (WD)
White	Race cancelled (C)
Blank	Did not practice (DNP)
Blank	Did not arrive (DNA)
Blank	Excluded (EX)

P – Pole position
F – Fastest lap

Notes:

- † – Rider did not finish the race, but was classified as they completed more than 75% of the race distance.
