= Yuki Okamoto =

Japanese motorcycle racer (born 1999)

Yuki Okamoto 岡本 裕生
- Born: 23 July 1999 (age 27); Yashio, Saitama, Japan
- Nationality: Japanese
- Current team: Yamaha Ten Kate Racing
- Bike number: 31

Championship titles
- All Japan JSB1000 (2024); All Japan ST600 (2018, 2020)
Statistics
WorldSSP
Active years	2025–
Championships	0
Manufacturer	Yamaha (2025–)
Last season (2026)	26th (6 points)
Starts / Wins / Podiums / Poles / F. laps / Points; 41 / 0 / 0 / 0 / 0 / 8
All Japan JSB1000
Active years	2022–2024
Championships	1
Manufacturer	Yamaha
Last season (2024)	1st (230 pts)
Starts / Wins / Podiums / Poles / F. laps / Points; 34 / 5 / 28 / 9 / 11 / 611
All Japan ST1000
Active years	2021
Championships	0
Manufacturer	Yamaha
Last season (2021)	5th (77 pts)
Starts / Wins / Podiums / Poles / F. laps / Points; 6 / 1 / 4 / 3 / 0 / 77
All Japan ST600
Active years	2017–2020
Championships	2
Manufacturer	Yamaha
Last season (2020)	1st (93 pts)
Starts / Wins / Podiums / Poles / F. laps / Points; 24 / 8 / 17 / 4 / 6 / 484

Yuki Okamoto (Japanese: 岡本 裕生, Hepburn: Okamoto Yūki; born 23 July 1999) is a Japanese motorcycle racer who competes in the Supersport World Championship for Yamaha Ten Kate Racing, having raced for the same team in 2025.

Okamoto is the 2024 All Japan Road Race JSB1000 champion, as well as the 2018 and 2020 ST600 champion.

== Early life ==
Okamoto was born in the city of Yashio, in Saitama, Japan. He began riding a pocket bike at the age of six, together with his brother, both influenced by their father. Okamoto was invited to join the Norifumi Abe-founded Team Norick around the age of 14, a racing school aimed at young Japanese riders, which Grand Prix motorcycle racers like Kohta Nozane have attended. In 2015, he participated in the ST600 Championship and won the Sugo and Tsukuba races.

== Career ==
=== All Japan Road Race Championship (2016–2024) ===
==== J-GP2 ====
In 2016, Okamoto entered the All Japan Road Race Championship J-GP2 class, aboard a Yamaha YZW-N6 prototype. In the opening round at Tsukuba, Okamoto crashed and suffered a broken femur in addition to a fractured ocular bone. Consequently, he missed the next three rounds of the championship and returned in the Motegi round. He finished the season with a best-place finish of 17th, and 26th overall.

==== ST600 ====
In 2017, Okamoto stepped down to the ST600 class of the All Japan Road Race Championship with 51Garage Team Iwaki. He claimed his maiden win in the second round at Sportsland Sugo, with an advantage of over nine seconds in the rain. He would also set his first ST600 pole position at Autopolis and closed off the season with a second career win at Suzuka. Okamoto would face his second ST600 season in 2018, and won the second race of the calendar at Sugo again. He claimed four more podiums across the season, including a second win at Tsukuba, and was crowned ST600 champion at the 50th MFJ Grand Prix at Suzuka, ahead of Tomoyoshi Koyama. Okamoto remained in the category for 2019 and won the opening round at Motegi, including a pole position and a fastest lap.. He would finish on the podium on three more occasions throughout the season, including a win at Tsukuba, but lost his title chances after a crash in the final round.

Okamoto faced his final ST600 season in 2020. He claimed victory in the opening round at Sugo, followed by a second place at Autopolis and a second win of the season at Motegi. Okamoto was crowned All Japan ST600 champion for a second time in the final round at Suzuka, following a fourth-place finish.

==== ST1000 ====
In 2021, Yamaha promoted Okamoto to the ST1000 class after four full seasons in ST600, including two championships. Okamoto finished third in his debut race in the season opener at Motegi and claimed his maiden pole position in wet conditions at Tsukuba. He would finish on the podium in three more occasions and ended the season with his first class win at Autopolis.

==== JSB1000 ====
On 8 February 2022, Yamaha announced Okamoto would be stepping up to the JSB1000 class with the Yamaha Factory Racing Team, with Katsuyuki Nakasuga as teammate. Okamoto finished in second place in Race 2 of the opening round and would secure podium finishes in the next six races behind teammate Nakasuga. During the Autopolis round's qualifying practice, Okamoto fell and injured his leg, which made him sit out the following two races. He finished his rookie season in third place behind riders' champion Nakasuga and Kazuki Watanabe.

In 2023, Okamoto closed the gap with his teammate Nakasuga, coming second in every race he finished except for Sugo Race 1, where he clinched his maiden JSB1000 win. In the final lap of the last round at Suzuka, Okamoto was leading the race into the final chicane when Nakasuga made contact with him, collecting both in the process. Both failed to cross the finish line, with his teammate being disqualified for the action. Okamoto ended the season as championship runner-up, 37 points behind his teammate, who took the crown for another year.

Okamoto faced his third full season in the JSB1000 class in 2024. He stayed on the podium in every race of the calendar, winning for the first time in the third round at Sugo, followed by three consecutive victories at the Autopolis and Okayama rounds. Coming into Race 2 of the final round at Suzuka, he and Nakasuga were tied on points. Okamoto was leading the race when the Safety Car was deployed, bunching up the field and bringing Nakasuga back into contention. After the Safety Car had been called in, Okamoto was passed by Ryo Mizuno and Nakasuga on the main straight, but the latter had trouble trying to stop the bike into Turn 1 and fell. Okamoto crossed the line in third place behind Mizuno and Nozane, and was crowned JSB1000 champion.

=== Supersport World Championship (2025–) ===
==== Yamaha Ten Kate Racing (2025–2026) ====
On 6 November 2024, Yamaha announced Okamoto would be moving to the 2025 Supersport World Championship with Ten Kate Racing. Ahead of his debut in the category, Okamoto stated that the biggest challenges he expected to face were the track adaptation and Pirelli tyre life, as well as the jump from the JSB Yamaha YZF-R1 to the Supersport YZF-R9.

During Day 1 of the pre-season tests held at Phillip Island, Okamoto crashed and suffered a fractured tailbone and a dislocation, which made him sit out the rest of the tests, as well as the season opener at the same track. His rookie season in the World Championship was underwhelming, only scoring points in Cremona Race 2. During the Qualifying Practice of the Donington Park round, Okamoto was involved in a serious accident after a collision with another rider, and was diagnosed with a concussion, chest injury and collarbone injury. He missed the following two rounds as a result, and concluded the season in 30th place in the championship standings.

On 25 November 2025, Yamaha announced Okamoto's renewal for a second season with Ten Kate Racing for the 2026 Supersport World Championship.

== Career statistics ==
=== All Japan Road Race Championship ===
==== Races by year ====
(key) (Races in bold indicate pole position; races in italics indicate fastest lap)

Year	Class	Bike	1	2	3	4	5	6	7	8	9	10	11	12	13	Pos	Pts
2016	J-GP2	Yamaha	TSU1; DNS	TSU2; DNS	MOT	AUT	SUG	MOT; 17	OKA; 20	SUZ; 19						26th	9.7
2017	ST600	Yamaha	TSU; 7	SUG; 1	MOT; 2	**AUT**; 10	OKA; 3	SUZ; 1								3rd	120
2018	ST600	Yamaha	MOT; 3	**SUG**; 1	TSU1; 3	TSU2; 1	AUT; 2	OKA; 5‡	SUZ; 2							1st	145
2019	ST600	Yamaha	**MOT**; 1	SUG; 2	TSU1; 4	**TSU2**; 1	**OKA**; 5	AUT; 3	SUZ; 29†							3rd	126
2020	ST600	Yamaha	SUG; 1	OKA; C	AUT; 2	MOT; 1	SUZ; 4									1st	93
2021	ST1000	Yamaha	MOT; 3	SUG; Ret	**TSU1**; DNS	**TSU2**; 3	**SUZ**; DSQ	OKA; 2	AUT; 1							5th	77
2022	JSB1000	Yamaha	MOT1; 5	MOT2; 2	SUZ1; 3	SUZ2; 3	AUT1; 2	AUT2; 2	SUG1; 2	SUG2; 2	AUT; DNS	OKA	SUZ1; 5	SUZ2; 19†	SUZ3; 4	3rd	173
2023	JSB1000	Yamaha	**MOT1**; 2	**MOT2**; 2	SUZ1; 2	SUZ2; 2	SUG1; 1	SUG2; 2	MOT; Ret	**AUT1**; 2	AUT2; 2	OKA; 2	SUZ1; 20†	SUZ2; 2		2nd	208
2024	JSB1000	Yamaha	SUZ; 3	MOT1; 3	MOT2; 2	**SUG1**; 2	**SUG2**; 1	MOT; 3	AUT1; 1	**AUT2**; 1	**OKA**; 1	**SUZ1**; 2	**SUZ2**; 3			1st	230

- † – Rider did not finish the race, but was classified as he completed more than ~75% of the race distance.
- ‡ – Half points were awarded based on the qualifying results at the 2018 Okayama round, due to the approach of Typhoon Trami.

=== Supersport World Championship ===
==== By season ====
Season	Motorcycle	Team	Race	Win	Podium	Pole	FLap	Pts	Plcd
2025	Yamaha YZF-R9	Yamaha Ten Kate Racing	18	0	0	0	0	2	30th
2026	Yamaha YZF-R9	Yamaha Ten Kate Racing	23	0	0	0	0	6	26th
Total			**41**	**0**	**0**	**0**	**0**	**8**	

==== Races by year ====
(key) (Races in bold indicate pole position; races in italics indicate fastest lap)

Year	Bike	1		2		3		4		5		6		7		8		9		10		11		12		Pos	Pts
Year	Bike	R1	R2	R1	R2	R1	R2	R1	R2	R1	R2	R1	R2	R1	R2	R1	R2	R1	R2	R1	R2	R1	R2	R1	R2	Pos	Pts
2025	Yamaha	AUS	AUS	POR; 24	POR; 21	NED; 17	NED; 16	ITA; 16	ITA; 14	CZE; 17	CZE; 31	EMI; 24	EMI; 20	GBR; DNS	GBR; DNS	HUN	HUN	FRA; 17	FRA; 18	ARA; 25	ARA; 26	POR; 24	POR; 25	SPA; 25	SPA; Ret	30th	2
2026	Yamaha	AUS; 17	AUS; 22	POR; 22	POR; 21	NED; 19	NED; 27	HUN; 24	HUN; 26	CZE; 19	CZE; 13	ARA; 24	ARA; 26	EMI; 20	EMI; 28	GBR; 21	GBR; 20	FRA; 13	FRA; 16	ITA; 20	ITA; 23	POR; 20	POR; 16	SPA; Ret	SPA; DNS	26th	6
