= 2023 Asia Road Racing Championship =

28th season Asia Road Racing Championship

2023 Asia Road Racing Championship
Previous:	2022	Next:	2024

The 2023 Idemitsu FIM Asia Road Racing Championship is the 28th season of the Asia Road Racing Championship. The season started on 24 March at Chang International Circuit in Thailand and ended on 3 December at Chang International Circuit.

Japanese motorcycle racer Haruki Noguchi was killed in the second ASB1000 race at Mandalika International Street Circuit when another racer crashed into him.

== Calendar and results ==
Round	Circuit	Date	ASB1000 Winners	SS600 Winners	AP250 Winners	UB150 Winners	TVS Asia Winners
1	(Thailand) Chang International Circuit	24–26 March	R1: (Japan) Haruki Noguchi	R1: (Malaysia) Khairul Idham Pawi	R1: (Indonesia) Rheza Danica Ahrens	R1: (Malaysia) Shafiq Rasol	R1: (Thailand) Vorapong Malahuan
1	(Thailand) Chang International Circuit	24–26 March	R2: (Japan) Haruki Noguchi	R2: (Thailand) Nakarin Atiratphuvapat	R2: (Indonesia) Rheza Danica Ahrens	R2: (Malaysia) Hafiza Rofa	R2: (Thailand) Vorapong Malahuan
2	(Malaysia) Sepang International Circuit	12–14 May	R1: (Germany) Markus Reiterberger	R1: (Malaysia) Azroy Hakeem Anuar	R1: (Indonesia) Herjun Atna Firdaus	R1: (Indonesia) Wawan Wello	R1: (Malaysia) Muzakkir Mohamed
2	(Malaysia) Sepang International Circuit	12–14 May	R2: (Germany) Markus Reiterberger	R2: (Malaysia) Khairul Idham Pawi	R2: (Indonesia) Veda Ega Pratama	R2: (Malaysia) Nazirul Izzat Bahauddin	R2: (Malaysia) Ramdan Rosli
3	(Japan) Sportsland Sugo	23–25 June	R1: (Malaysia) Kasma Daniel Kasmayudin	R1: (Japan) Keito Abe	R1: (Indonesia) Rheza Danica Ahrens	R1: (Malaysia) Nazirul Izzat Bahauddin	R1: (Japan) Hiroki Ono
3	(Japan) Sportsland Sugo	23–25 June	R2: (Germany) Markus Reiterberger	R2: (Malaysia) Khairul Idham Pawi	R2: (Indonesia) Herjun Atna Firdaus	R2: (Philippines) John Emerson Inguito	R2: (Malaysia) Ramdan Rosli
4	(Indonesia) Mandalika International Street Circuit	11–13 August	R1: (Germany) Markus Reiterberger	R1: (Malaysia) Helmi Azman	R1: (Indonesia) Herjun Atna Firdaus	R1: (Malaysia) Nazirul Izzat Bahauddin	R1: (Japan) Hiroki Ono
4	(Indonesia) Mandalika International Street Circuit	11–13 August	R2: Race cancelled (Note: The race was stopped and eventually cancelled due to Haruki Noguchi's fatal accident.)	R2: (Japan) Soichiro Minamimoto	R2: (Indonesia) Herjun Atna Firdaus	R2: (Indonesia) Arai Agaska Dibani Laksana	R2: (Japan) Hiroki Ono
5	(China) Zhuhai International Circuit	3–5 November	R1: (Germany) Markus Reiterberger	R1: (Malaysia) Azroy Hakeem Anuar	R1: (Thailand) Muklada Sarapuech	R1: (Malaysia) Akid Aziz	R1: (Japan) Hiroki Ono
5	(China) Zhuhai International Circuit	3–5 November	R2: (Germany) Markus Reiterberger	R2: (Thailand) Nakarin Atiratphuvapat	R2: (Indonesia) Veda Ega Pratama	R2: (Malaysia) Shafiq Rasol	R2: (Japan) Hiroki Ono
6	(Thailand) Chang International Circuit	1–3 December	R1: (Indonesia) Andi Farid Izdihar	R1: (Japan) Soichiro Minamimoto	R1: (Indonesia) Veda Ega Pratama	R1: (Indonesia) Murobbil Vittoni	R1: (Japan) Hiroki Ono
6	(Thailand) Chang International Circuit	1–3 December	R2: (Germany) Markus Reiterberger	R2: (Thailand) Apiwat Wongthananon	R2: (Thailand) Jakkreephat Phuettisan	R2: (Malaysia) Shafiq Rasol	R2: (Japan) Hiroki Ono

=== Calendar changes ===
- Zhuhai International Circuit will host an ARRC round for the first time since 2019, after a failed attempt in 2022 due to COVID-19 restrictions in China.
- On 12 January 2023, it was announced that Mandalika International Street Circuit will host the 4th round of the season, making it the first time the circuit will host an ARRC round.

Footnotes

== Teams and riders ==
2023 ASB1000 Entry List
Team	Constructor	Motorcycle	No.	Rider	Rounds
Savitar Team Asia (Malaysia)	BMW	BMW M1000RR	16	(Malaysia) Teo Yew Joe	1–4, 6
ONEXOX BMW TKKR Team (Malaysia)	BMW	BMW M1000RR	25	(Malaysia) Azlan Shah	All
ONEXOX BMW TKKR Team (Malaysia)	BMW	BMW M1000RR	28	(Germany) Markus Reiterberger	All
Evolution Sports Group (Australia)	BMW	BMW M1000RR	83	(Australia) Lachlan Epis	All
Honda Asia-Dream Racing with SHOWA (Japan)	Honda	Honda CBR1000RR-R Fireblade	1	(Malaysia) Zaqhwan Zaidi	All
Honda Asia-Dream Racing with SHOWA (Japan)	Honda	Honda CBR1000RR-R Fireblade	23	(Indonesia) Andi Farid Izdihar	All
Murayama Unso. Honda Dream. K. W (Japan)	Honda	Honda CBR1000RR-R Fireblade	12	(Japan) Kousuke Akiyoshi	3
MOTO BUM HONDA (Japan)	Honda	Honda CBR1000RR-R Fireblade	54	(Japan) Kohta Arakawa	3
SDG MS HARC-PRO Honda Philippines	Honda	Honda CBR1000RR-R Fireblade	73	(Japan) Haruki Noguchi	1–4
EEST NJT Racing Team (Thailand)	Honda	Honda CBR1000RR-R Fireblade	91	(Thailand) Jakkrit Swangswat	All
Astemo SI Racing with Thai Honda (Thailand)	Honda	Honda CBR1000RR-R Fireblade	95	(Thailand) Passawit Thitivararak	1–2
TOHO Racing (Japan)	Honda	Honda CBR1000RR-R Fireblade	104	(Japan) Takuma Kunimine	3
Victor Racing MLT Yamaha (Malaysia)	Yamaha	Yamaha YZF-R1	13	(Australia) Anthony West	1–3
Victor Racing MLT Yamaha (Malaysia)	Yamaha	Yamaha YZF-R1	44	(Yemen) Osama Mareai	4-6
YAMAHA GEN BLU Racing Team ASEAN (Thailand)	Yamaha	Yamaha YZF-R1	27	(Malaysia) Kasma Daniel	All
YAMAHA GEN BLU Racing Team ASEAN (Thailand)	Yamaha	Yamaha YZF-R1	76	(Japan) Yuki Ito	3-6
YAMAHA GEN BLU Racing Team ASEAN (Thailand)	Yamaha	Yamaha YZF-R1	81	(Thailand) Keminth Kubo	1–2
DOG FIGHT RACING (Japan)	Yamaha	Yamaha YZF-R1	67	(Japan) Rei Toshima	3
Team GYTR (Japan)	Yamaha	Yamaha YZF-R1	75	(Japan) Keisuke Maeda	3
Waveinn R (Japan)	Yamaha	Yamaha YZF-R1	85	(Japan) Shinichi Nakatomi	3
2023 SS600 Entry List
Team	Constructor	Motorcycle	No.	Rider	Rounds
Honda Racing Thailand	Honda	Honda CBR600RR	15	(Thailand) Pannasorn Kaewsonthi	1–4
Honda Racing Thailand	Honda	Honda CBR600RR	41	(Thailand) Nakarin Atiratphuvapat	1–4
Boon Siew Honda Racing Team (Singapore)	Honda	Honda CBR600RR	20	(Malaysia) Azroy Anuar	1–4
Boon Siew Honda Racing Team (Singapore)	Honda	Honda CBR600RR	32	(Malaysia) Helmi Azman	1–4
Boon Siew Honda Racing Team (Singapore)	Honda	Honda CBR600RR	89	(Malaysia) Khairul Idham Pawi	1–4
ASTRA Honda Racing Team (Indonesia)	Honda	Honda CBR600RR	21	(Indonesia) Adenanta Putra	1–4
ASTRA Honda Racing Team (Indonesia)	Honda	Honda CBR600RR	31	(Indonesia) Gerry Salim	1–3
ASTRA Honda Racing Team (Indonesia)	Honda	Honda CBR600RR	93	(Indonesia) Fadillah Arbi Aditama	4
MOTO BUM HONDA (Japan)	Honda	Honda CBR600RR	54	(Japan) Motoharu Ito	3
AKENO SPEED GREENCYCLE (Japan)	Yamaha	Yamaha YZF-R6	17	(Japan) Shota Ite	3
YAMAHA GEN BLU Racing Team ASEAN (Thailand)	Yamaha	Yamaha YZF-R6	22	(Japan) Soichiro Minamimoto	1–4
YAMAHA GEN BLU Racing Team ASEAN (Thailand)	Yamaha	Yamaha YZF-R6	50	(Malaysia) Ahmad Afif Amran	1–3
YAMAHA GEN BLU Racing Team ASEAN (Thailand)	Yamaha	Yamaha YZF-R6	66	(Malaysia) Ibrahim Norrodin	4
ONEXOX TKKR Racing Team (Malaysia)	Yamaha	Yamaha YZF-R6	51	(Japan) Keito Abe	1–4
ONEXOX TKKR Racing Team (Malaysia)	Yamaha	Yamaha YZF-R6	57	(Japan) Sho Nishimura	3
TEAM KENKEN (Japan)	Yamaha	Yamaha YZF-R6	55	(Japan) Kengo Nagao	3
Yamaha Thailand Racing Team	Yamaha	Yamaha YZF-R6	56	(Thailand) Ratthapong Wilairot	1–3
AKENO SPEED MAVERICK (Japan)	Yamaha	Yamaha YZF-R6	64	(Japan) Yuta Date	3
Yamaha Racing Indonesia	Yamaha	Yamaha YZF-R6	49	(Japan) Rei Matsuoka	4
Yamaha Racing Indonesia	Yamaha	Yamaha YZF-R6	99	(Indonesia) Galang Hendra Pratama	1–4
Yamaha Racing Indonesia	Yamaha	Yamaha YZF-R6	108	(Indonesia) Andy Muhammad Fadly	1–4
Victor Racing MLT Yamaha (Australia)	Yamaha	Yamaha YZF-R6	222	(China) Sha Juntong	1–4
2023 AP250 Entry List
Team	Constructor	Motorcycle	No.	Rider	Rounds
Honda Racing Thailand	Honda	Honda CBR250RR	11	(Thailand) Thanat Laoongplio	1–4
Honda Racing Thailand	Honda	Honda CBR250RR	20	(Thailand) Jakkreephat Phuettisan	1–3
Honda Racing Thailand	Honda	Honda CBR250RR	44	(Thailand) Muklada Sarapuech	1–4
Honda Racing Thailand	Honda	Honda CBR250RR	149	(Thailand) Kiattisak Singhapong	4
RIT Racing India Team	Honda	Honda CBR250RR	17	(India) Mohsin Paramban	1–2, 4
RIT Racing India Team	Honda	Honda CBR250RR	50	(India) Kavin Quintal	1–4
Idemitsu Boon Siew Honda Racing Team (Singapore)	Honda	Honda CBR250RR	19	(Malaysia) Idlan Haqimi	1–4
Idemitsu Boon Siew Honda Racing Team (Singapore)	Honda	Honda CBR250RR	41	(Malaysia) Irfan Haykal	1–4
TEAM TEC2&24Service&YSS (Japan)	Honda	Honda CBR250RR	24	(Japan) Yoshihiro Toyohara	3
EEST NJT Racing Team (Thailand)	Honda	Honda CBR250RR	25	(Thailand) Watcharin Tubtimon	1–4
EEST NJT Racing Team (Thailand)	Honda	Honda CBR250RR	55	(Taiwan) Li Ruie Yun	1–3
EEST NJT Racing Team (Thailand)	Honda	Honda CBR250RR	94	(Thailand) Warit Thongnoppakun	1–4
EEST NJT Racing Team (Thailand)	Honda	Honda CBR250RR	144	(Thailand) Panchapol Jarungdtikul	4
SDG MS HARC-PRO Honda Philippines	Honda	Honda CBR250RR	27	(Japan) Chihiro Ishii	1–4
SDG MS HARC-PRO Honda Philippines	Honda	Honda CBR250RR	79	(Japan) Toshiki Senda	1–3
ASTRA Honda Racing Team (Indonesia)	Honda	Honda CBR250RR	46	(Indonesia) Herjun Atna Firdaus	1–4
ASTRA Honda Racing Team (Indonesia)	Honda	Honda CBR250RR	54	(Indonesia) Veda Ega Pratama	1–3
ASTRA Honda Racing Team (Indonesia)	Honda	Honda CBR250RR	123	(Indonesia) Rheza Danica Ahrens	1–4
ASTRA Honda Racing Team (Indonesia)	Honda	Honda CBR250RR	212	(Indonesia) Kiandra Ramadhipa	4
Honda Racing Vietnam Team	Honda	Honda CBR250RR	65	(Vietnam) Cao Viet Nam	1–4
Honda Racing Vietnam Team	Honda	Honda CBR250RR	193	(Vietnam) Nguyen Duc Thanh	1–4
Team Gordon Racing (Indonesia)	Honda	Honda CBR250RR	96	(Indonesia) Alief Adamsyah	4
Motul Sniper Manual Tech (Vietnam)	Kawasaki	Kawasaki Ninja 250	16	(Indonesia) Irfan Ardiansyah	1–4
Motul Sniper Manual Tech (Vietnam)	Kawasaki	Kawasaki Ninja 250	33	(Taiwan) Liu Chun Mei	1–4
Motul Sniper Manual Tech (Vietnam)	Kawasaki	Kawasaki Ninja 250	37	(Japan) Aiki Iyoshi	1–4
Motul Sniper Manual Tech (Vietnam)	Kawasaki	Kawasaki Ninja 250	96	(Indonesia) Alief Adamsyah	2
Yamaha Racing Indonesia	Yamaha	Yamaha YZF-R25	36	(Indonesia) Faerozi Toreqottullah	1–4
Yamaha Racing Indonesia	Yamaha	Yamaha YZF-R25	57	(Indonesia) Aldy Satya Mahendra	4
Yamaha Racing Indonesia	Yamaha	Yamaha YZF-R25	89	(Indonesia) Wahyu Nugroho	1–4
Victor Racing MLT Yamaha (Australia)	Yamaha	Yamaha YZF-R25	15	(Hong Kong) Leong Nang Tse	2–4
Victor Racing MLT Yamaha (Australia)	Yamaha	Yamaha YZF-R25	80	(India) Rajiv Sethu	1
Victor Racing MLT Yamaha (Australia)	Yamaha	Yamaha YZF-R25	95	(China) Ni Tian	2–4
REY Racing Speed 222 (Indonesia)	Yamaha	Yamaha YZF-R25	222	(Indonesia) Reynaldo C. Ratukore	4
REY Racing Speed 222 (Indonesia)	Yamaha	Yamaha YZF-R25	306	(Indonesia) Felix Putra Mulya	4
2023 UB150 Entry List
Team	Constructor	Motorcycle	No.	Rider	Rounds
SCK Honda Racing Team (Thailand)	Honda	Honda Supra GTR150	32	(Thailand) Pacharagorn Thonggerdloung	1–4
SCK Honda Racing Team (Thailand)	Honda	Honda Supra GTR150	71	(Malaysia) Izam Ikmal	1–4
Estremo Yuzy Honda Team (Malaysia)	Honda	Honda Supra GTR150	61	(Malaysia) Shahrol Syazras	1–4
Estremo Yuzy Honda Team (Malaysia)	Honda	Honda Supra GTR150	78	(Malaysia) Haziq Hamdan	1–4
Honda Racing Vietnam	Honda	Honda Winner 150-R	111	(Vietnam) Nguyen Huu Tri	1–4
Honda Racing Vietnam	Honda	Honda Winner 150-R	178	(Vietnam) Nguyen Anh Tuan	1–4
4S1M R59 Racing (Indonesia)	Honda	Honda Winner 150-R	12	(Indonesia) Ilham Effendi	4
Pitsbike JRT Tech 2 OneWay Racing Team (Malaysia)	Yamaha	Yamaha Y15ZR	11	(Malaysia) Ahmad Fazrul Sham	1–4
Pitsbike JRT Tech 2 OneWay Racing Team (Malaysia)	Yamaha	Yamaha Y15ZR	38	(Indonesia) Wawan Wello	1–4
Cardinals Factory Racing Team ARRC (Australia)	Yamaha	Yamaha Y15ZR	13	(Malaysia) Akid Aziz	1–2, 4
Cardinals Factory Racing Team ARRC (Australia)	Yamaha	Yamaha Y15ZR	73	(Malaysia) Arash Tsunami Kamarudin	3
Cardinals Factory Racing Team ARRC (Australia)	Yamaha	Yamaha Y15ZR	98	(Malaysia) Izzat Zaidi	1–4
UMA Racing YAMAHA Maju Motor Asia Team (Malaysia)	Yamaha	Yamaha Y15ZR	17	(Malaysia) Haziq Fairues	1–4
UMA Racing YAMAHA Maju Motor Asia Team (Malaysia)	Yamaha	Yamaha Y15ZR	87	(Malaysia) Nazirul Izzat Bahauddin	1–4
JETRON YAMAHA YYPANG RACING TEAM (Vietnam)	Yamaha	Yamaha Sniper 150-R	18	(Malaysia) Shafiq Ezzariq	2
GIVI TEKHNE YAMAHA (Cambodia)	Yamaha	Yamaha Sniper 150-R	21	(Malaysia) Iqbal Amri	2
4S1M EVO Yamaha Racing Team (Philippines)	Yamaha	Yamaha Sniper 150-R	22	(Philippines) John Emerson Inguito	1–4
4S1M EVO Yamaha Racing Team (Philippines)	Yamaha	Yamaha Sniper 150-R	23	(Indonesia) Gupita Kresna Wardhana	1–4
ONEXOX TKKR Racing Team (Malaysia)	Yamaha	Yamaha MX King 150	24	(Malaysia) Hafiza Rofa	1–4
ONEXOX TKKR Racing Team (Malaysia)	Yamaha	Yamaha MX King 150	31	(Malaysia) Norhakim Norhafizullah	4
ONEXOX TKKR Racing Team (Malaysia)	Yamaha	Yamaha MX King 150	46	(Malaysia) Ahmad Fazli Sham	1–4
ONEXOX TKKR Racing Team (Malaysia)	Yamaha	Yamaha MX King 150	122	(Malaysia) Shafiq Rasol	1–4
UMA Racing MMR Yamaha Philippines	Yamaha	Yamaha MX King 150	43	(Philippines) April King Mascardo	1–4
UMA Racing MMR Yamaha Philippines	Yamaha	Yamaha MX King 150	124	(Philippines) Gian Carlo Mauricio	1–4
One For All (Thailand)	Yamaha	Yamaha MX King 150	14	(Thailand) Peerapong Luiboonpeng	3
One For All (Thailand)	Yamaha	Yamaha MX King 150	53	(Thailand) Passkon Sanluang	1-4
One For All (Thailand)	Yamaha	Yamaha MX King 150	54	(Thailand) Worapot Thongdonmaun	4
Racetech Sixty Racing (Indonesia)	Yamaha	Yamaha MX King 150	60	(Indonesia) Wahyu Aji Trilaksana	1–4
Racetech Sixty Racing (Indonesia)	Yamaha	Yamaha MX King 150	177	(Indonesia) Aditya Fauzi	4
LFN H Putra 969 Indonesia Racing Team	Yamaha	Yamaha MX King 150	157	(Indonesia) Murobbil Vittoni	1–4
LFN H Putra 969 Indonesia Racing Team	Yamaha	Yamaha MX King 150	171	(Indonesia) Reynaldi Pradana	1–2
LFN H Putra 969 Indonesia Racing Team	Yamaha	Yamaha MX King 150	202	(Indonesia) Dimas Juli Atmoko	1–4
LFN H Putra 969 Indonesia Racing Team	Yamaha	Yamaha MX King 150	222	(Indonesia) Fahmi Basam	3–4
LFN H Putra 969 Indonesia Racing Team	Yamaha	Yamaha MX King 150	338	(Indonesia) Arai Agaska Dibani Laksana	4
GG Galak Galak (Indonesia)	Yamaha	Yamaha MX King 150	69	(Indonesia) Aldiaz Aqsal Ismaya	4
Ziear ARL Racing (Indonesia)	Yamaha	Yamaha MX King 150	143	(Indonesia) Husni Zainul Fuadzy	4
Wasaka BKW18 Kalsel Racing Team (Indonesia)	Yamaha	Yamaha MX King 150	293	(Indonesia) Gilang Akbar Roland	4
Milanisty Waropen 549 Kaboci (Thailand)	Yamaha	Yamaha MX King 150	65	(Indonesia) Rio Andriyanto	4
2023 TVS Asia One Make Championship Entry List
Team	Constructor	Motorcycle	No.	Rider	Rounds
TVS AOM Racing (India)	TVS	TVS Apache RR 310	1	(Thailand) Vorapong Malahuan	1–4
TVS AOM Racing (India)	TVS	TVS Apache RR 310	2	(Indonesia) Decky Tiarno Aldy	1–4
TVS AOM Racing (India)	TVS	TVS Apache RR 310	3	(Japan) Fugo Tanaka	1–4
TVS AOM Racing (India)	TVS	TVS Apache RR 310	4	(India) KY Ahmed	1–4
TVS AOM Racing (India)	TVS	TVS Apache RR 310	5	(Singapore) Arsyad Rusydi	1–4
TVS AOM Racing (India)	TVS	TVS Apache RR 310	6	(India) Jagan Kumar	1–4
TVS AOM Racing (India)	TVS	TVS Apache RR 310	7	(India) Deepak Ravikumar	1–2
TVS AOM Racing (India)	TVS	TVS Apache RR 310	8	(Philippines) Kerwin Eins Chang	1–4
TVS AOM Racing (India)	TVS	TVS Apache RR 310	9	(Indonesia) Louis Abelhard	1–2, 4
TVS AOM Racing (India)	TVS	TVS Apache RR 310	10	(Malaysia) Ramdan Rosli	1–4
TVS AOM Racing (India)	TVS	TVS Apache RR 310	11	(Malaysia) Muzakkir Mohamed	1–4
TVS AOM Racing (India)	TVS	TVS Apache RR 310	12	(Japan) Taiyo Sato	1–2, 4
TVS AOM Racing (India)	TVS	TVS Apache RR 310	13	(Thailand) Piyawat Patoomyos	1–4
TVS AOM Racing (India)	TVS	TVS Apache RR 310	14	(Thailand) Daranpod Thongyay	1–4
TVS AOM Racing (India)	TVS	TVS Apache RR 310	15	(India) Chiranth Vishwanath	2–4
TVS AOM Racing (India)	TVS	TVS Apache RR 310	16	(Japan) Hiroki Ono	3–4
TVS AOM Racing (India)	TVS	TVS Apache RR 310	17	(Japan) Miu Nakahara	3
TVS AOM Racing (India)	TVS	TVS Apache RR 310	18	(Indonesia) Rusman Fadhil	4

All teams use series-specified Dunlop tyres.

== Championship standings ==
Scoring system

Points were awarded to the top fifteen finishers. Rider had to finish the race to earn points.

Points

Position	**1st**	**2nd**	**3rd**	**4th**	**5th**	**6th**	**7th**	**8th**	**9th**	**10th**	**11th**	**12th**	**13th**	**14th**	**15th**
Points	25	20	16	13	11	10	9	8	7	6	5	4	3	2	1

=== Riders' standing ===
==== Asia Superbike 1000 ====
Pos.	Rider	Bike	CHA (Thailand)		SEP (Malaysia)		SUG (Japan)		MAN (Indonesia)		ZHU (China)		CHA (Thailand)		Pts
Pos.	Rider	Bike	R1	R2	R1	R2	R1	R2	R1	R2	R1	R2	R1	R2	Pts
1	(Germany) Markus Reiterberger	BMW	4	6	**1**	**1**	2	1	**1**	C	**1**	**1**	2	1	228
2	(Indonesia) Andi Farid Izdihar	Honda	5	4	5	4	4	2	2	C	4	4	**1**	**2**	172
3	(Malaysia) Zaqhwan Zaidi	Honda	**3**	**2**	3	5	11	3	3	C	2	2	3	3	172
4	(Malaysia) Azlan Shah Kamaruzaman	BMW	2	3	2	3	Ret	11	5	C	3	3	4	4	146
5	(Malaysia) Kasma Daniel Kasmayudin	Yamaha	8	7	6	7	1	Ret	6	C	8	7	7	7	106
6	(Japan) Haruki Noguchi^{†}	Honda	1	1	4	2	**7**	**Ret**	4	C^{†}					105
7	(Thailand) Jakkrit Swangswat	Honda	7	11	11	9	13	12	9	C	6	6	9	8	75
8	(Japan) Yuki Ito	Yamaha					5	6	8	C	5	5	8	9	66
9	(Australia) Lachlan Epis	BMW	Ret	9	7	DNS	12	DNS	7	C	9	Ret	Ret	10	42
10	(Thailand) Passawit Thitivararak	Honda	6	5	10	6									37
11	(Thailand) Keminth Kubo	Yamaha	9	8	9	8									30
12	(Malaysia) Teo Yew Joe	BMW	11	10	12	Ret	15	Ret	11	C	DNS	DNS	10	Ret	27
13	(Australia) Anthony West	Yamaha	10	Ret	8	Ret	Ret	7							23
14	(Japan) Keisuke Maeda	Yamaha					3	10							22
15	(Japan) Kohta Arakawa	Honda					8	4							21
16	(Japan) Kosuke Sakumoto	Honda									Ret	Ret	6	5	21
17	(Japan) Yuki Kunii	Honda											5	6	21
18	(Japan) Rei Toshima	Yamaha					10	5							17
19	(China) Chen Hong Yan	Yamaha									7	8			17
20	(Yemen) Osama Mareai	Yamaha							10	C	DNS	DNS	11	11	16
21	(Japan) Kousuke Akiyoshi	Honda					9	9							14
22	(Japan) Takuma Kunimine	Honda					6	Ret							10
23	(Japan) Shinichi Nakatomi	Yamaha					14	8							10
24	(Chinese Taipei) Chiang Chih Ying	Yamaha											Ret	12	4
Pos.	Rider	Bike	CHA (Thailand)		SEP (Malaysia)		SUG (Japan)		MAN (Indonesia)		ZHU (China)		CHA (Thailand)		Pts

Colour	Result
Gold	Winner
Silver	Second place
Bronze	Third place
Green	Points classification
Blue	Non-points classification
Blue	Non-classified finish (NC)
Purple	Retired, not classified (Ret)
Red	Did not qualify (DNQ)
Red	Did not pre-qualify (DNPQ)
Black	Disqualified (DSQ)
White	Did not start (DNS)
White	Withdrew (WD)
White	Race cancelled (C)
Blank	Did not practice (DNP)
Blank	Did not arrive (DNA)
Blank	Excluded (EX)

**Bold** – Pole position
Italics – Fastest lap

==== Supersports 600 ====
Pos.	Rider	Bike	CHA (Thailand)		SEP (Malaysia)		SUG (Japan)		MAN (Indonesia)		ZHU (China)		CHA (Thailand)		Pts
Pos.	Rider	Bike	R1	R2	R1	R2	R1	R2	R1	R2	R1	R2	R1	R2	Pts
1	(Japan) Soichiro Minamimoto	Yamaha	6	3	5	7	2	4	3	1	3	2	**1**	**2**	201
2	(Malaysia) Khairul Idham Pawi	Honda	**1**	**2**	**2**	**1**	13	1	2	8	4	12	3	10	185
3	(Thailand) Nakarin Atiratphuvapat	Honda	2	1	4	3	3	DSQ	6	2	5	1	4	4	182
4	(Malaysia) Helmi Azman	Honda	3	9	3	2	4	3	**1**	**Ret**	**2**	**3**	9	12	160
5	(Japan) Keito Abe	Yamaha	4	4	7	5	1	2	4	5	DNS	6	7	5	145
6	(Malaysia) Azroy Hakeem Anuar	Honda	Ret	5	1	Ret	5	Ret	13	4	1	Ret	5	3	115
7	(Indonesia) Adenanta Putra	Honda	8	8	6	12	Ret	11	7	3	8	5	6	Ret	89
8	(Thailand) Ratthapong Wilairot	Yamaha	7	7	8	4	10	12	12	Ret	9	Ret	8	6	78
9	(Thailand) Pannasorn Kaewsonthi	Honda	Ret	6	9	6	9	10	9	Ret	10	4	Ret	7	75
10	(Indonesia) Galang Hendra Pratama	Yamaha	9	Ret	Ret	9	8	9	8	Ret	7	7	Ret	8	63
11	(Thailand) Apiwath Wongthananon	Yamaha											2	1	45
12	(Indonesia) Andy Muhammad Fadly	Yamaha	Ret	10	10	11	12	Ret	14	9	11	9			42
13	(Malaysia) Ibrahim Norrodin	Yamaha							10	7	6	8			33
14	(Indonesia) Fadillah Arbi Aditama	Honda							5	6			Ret	9	28
15	(Indonesia) Gerry Salim	Honda	5	13	11	10	Ret	DNS							25
16	(Malaysia) Ahmad Afif Amran	Yamaha	Ret	11	13	8	11	13							24
17	(China) Sha Juntong	Yamaha	10	12	12	13	Ret	DNS	15	10					24
18	(Japan) Yuta Date	Yamaha					7	7							18
19	(Japan) Kengo Nagao	Yamaha					**Ret**	**5**							11
20	(Thailand) Chanon Inta	Honda											10	11	11
21	(Japan) Motoharu Ito	Honda					6	Ret							10
22	(Japan) Sho Nishimura	Yamaha					Ret	6							10
23	(China) Lin Zhifei	Kawasaki									12	10			10
24	(Japan) Shota Ite	Yamaha					Ret	8							8
25	(China) Zhou Feng Long	Kawasaki									13	13			6
26	(Japan) Rei Matsuoka	Yamaha							11	Ret					5
27	(China) Jia Yi Feng	Kawasaki									DNS	11			5
Pos.	Rider	Bike	CHA (Thailand)		SEP (Malaysia)		SUG (Japan)		MAN (Indonesia)		ZHU (China)		CHA (Thailand)		Pts

Colour	Result
Gold	Winner
Silver	Second place
Bronze	Third place
Green	Points classification
Blue	Non-points classification
Blue	Non-classified finish (NC)
Purple	Retired, not classified (Ret)
Red	Did not qualify (DNQ)
Red	Did not pre-qualify (DNPQ)
Black	Disqualified (DSQ)
White	Did not start (DNS)
White	Withdrew (WD)
White	Race cancelled (C)
Blank	Did not practice (DNP)
Blank	Did not arrive (DNA)
Blank	Excluded (EX)

**Bold** – Pole position
Italics – Fastest lap

==== Asia Production 250 ====
Pos.	Rider	Bike	CHA (Thailand)		SEP (Malaysia)		SUG (Japan)		MAN (Indonesia)		ZHU (China)		CHA (Thailand)		Pts
Pos.	Rider	Bike	R1	R2	R1	R2	R1	R2	R1	R2	R1	R2	R1	R2	Pts
1	(Indonesia) Rheza Danica Ahrens	Honda	1	1	**2**	**3**	1	5	4	2	2	4	6	8	206
2	(Indonesia) Herjun Atna Firdaus	Honda	**3**	**Ret**	1	2	4	1	**1**	**1**	Ret	3	4	2	198
3	(Indonesia) Veda Ega Pratama	Honda	2	9	3	1	3	3			**6**	**1**	**1**	**Ret**	160
4	(Thailand) Jakkreephat Phuettisan	Honda	7	2	4	Ret	6	10			3	2	2	1	139
5	(Thailand) Muklada Sarapuech	Honda	4	3	Ret	11	2	Ret	21	Ret	1	6	3	3	121
6	(Japan) Aiki Iyoshi	Kawasaki	9	5	5	5	23	2	10	6	7	10	8	7	108
7	(Indonesia) Irfan Ardiansyah	Kawasaki	5	DSQ	8	4	7	9	25	3	8	9	10	6	95
8	(Vietnam) Cao Viet Nam	Honda	8	4	11	10	13	6	6	18	Ret	8	5	4	87
9	(Indonesia) Faerozi Toreqottullah	Yamaha	13	Ret	6	7	**5**	**Ret**	5	Ret	4	7	Ret	5	77
10	(Indonesia) Wahyu Nugroho	Yamaha	12	Ret	12	16	9	4	3	4	Ret	Ret	9	9	71
11	(Thailand) Thanat Laoongpio	Honda	Ret	8	Ret	8	8	17	8	16	5	5	7	17	63
12	(Malaysia) Irfan Haykal	Honda	10	6	7	6	15	13	13	11	Ret	15			48
13	(Malaysia) Idlan Haqimi	Honda	14	15	9	9	11	Ret	15	8	9	14	14	13	45
14	(Thailand) Warit Thongnoppakun	Honda	6	7	DNS		12	Ret	17	12	10	11	12	15	43
15	(Thailand) Watcharin Tubtimon	Honda	11	10	10	15	17	7	Ret	13	11	16	18	14	37
16	(India) KS Quintal	Honda	15	11	14	Ret	18	8	16	14	14	12	Ret	10	30
17	(Indonesia) Aldi Satya Mahendra	Yamaha							2	Ret					20
18	(Indonesia) Kiandra Ramadhipa	Honda							7	5					20
19	(Indonesia) Reynaldo Ratukore	Yamaha							11	7					14
20	(Indonesia) Alief Adamsyah	Kawasaki			Ret	12									14
20	(Indonesia) Alief Adamsyah	Honda							12	10					14
21	(Thailand) Suhathai Chaemsup	Honda									13	13	13	12	13
22	(Malaysia) Ahmad Darwisy Sahir	Honda											11	11	10
23	(China) Ni Tian	Yamaha			15	14	14	11	Ret	Ret	18	19	20	20	10
24	(Indonesia) Felix Putra Mulya	Yamaha							14	9					9
25	(Taiwan) Chun Mei Liu	Kawasaki	18	Ret	13	13	19	14	18	Ret	15	Ret	19	19	9
26	(Japan) Chihiro Ishii	Honda	17	12	Ret	18	16	12	19	Ret			17	18	8
27	(Thailand) Kiattisak Singhapong	Honda							9	17					7
28	(Japan) Toshiki Senda	Honda					10	Ret							6
29	(Vietnam) Nguyen Duc Thanh	Honda	20	Ret	16	17	21	Ret	20	15	12	17	15	Ret	6
30	(India) Mohsin Paramban	Honda	19	13	17	Ret			22	19	17	18	16	Ret	3
31	(Taiwan) Li Ruie Yun	Honda	21	14	19	20	Ret	DNS					21	22	2
32	(Japan) Yoshihiro Toyohara	Honda					20	15							1
33	(Hong Kong) Leong Nang Tse	Yamaha			18	19	22	16	24	20	16	Ret	Ret	21	0
34	(India) Rajiv Sethu	Yamaha	16	Ret											0
35	(Thailand) Atih Kanghair	Yamaha											Ret	16	0
36	(China) Gao Zi Ang	Yamaha									19	Ret			0
37	(Thailand) Panchapol Jarungdtikul	Honda							23	21					0
Pos.	Rider	Bike	CHA (Thailand)		SEP (Malaysia)		SUG (Japan)		MAN (Indonesia)		ZHU (China)		CHA (Thailand)		Pts

Colour	Result
Gold	Winner
Silver	Second place
Bronze	Third place
Green	Points classification
Blue	Non-points classification
Blue	Non-classified finish (NC)
Purple	Retired, not classified (Ret)
Red	Did not qualify (DNQ)
Red	Did not pre-qualify (DNPQ)
Black	Disqualified (DSQ)
White	Did not start (DNS)
White	Withdrew (WD)
White	Race cancelled (C)
Blank	Did not practice (DNP)
Blank	Did not arrive (DNA)
Blank	Excluded (EX)

**Bold** – Pole position
Italics – Fastest lap

==== Underbone 150 ====
Pos.	Rider	Bike	CHA (Thailand)		SEP (Malaysia)		SUG (Japan)		MAN (Indonesia)		ZHU (China)		CHA (Thailand)		Pts
Pos.	Rider	Bike	R1	R2	R1	R2	R1	R2	R1	R2	R1	R2	R1	R2	Pts
1	(Malaysia) Nazirul Izzat Bahauddin	Yamaha	5	12	10	1	**1**	**2**	1	2	6	6	16	8	164
2	(Malaysia) Shafiq Rasol	Yamaha	1	13	Ret	2	11	Ret	6	8	3	1	3	1	153
3	(Indonesia) Murobbil Vittoni	Yamaha	14	5	2	4	4	4	16	20	7	2	1	5	137
4	(Indonesia) Gupita Kresna Wardhana	Yamaha	13	6	3	8	3	3	8	14	4	9	4	6	122
5	(Malaysia) Akid Aziz	Yamaha	6	19	8	7			2	6	**1**	**Ret**	**11**	**2**	107
6	(Malaysia) Hafiza Rofa	Yamaha	**7**	**1**	Ret	3	7	Ret	14	7	5	Ret	2	11	106
7	(Indonesia) Wawan Wello	Yamaha	3	3	**1**	**Ret**	5	Ret	12	19	Ret	3	14	3	106
8	(Malaysia) Haziq Fairues	Yamaha	2	7	Ret	17	9	Ret	13	Ret	9	5	8	10	71
9	(Indonesia) Wahyu Aji Trilaksana	Yamaha	8	10	Ret	Ret	2	12	5	Ret	Ret	19	9	4	69
10	(Malaysia) Izzat Zaidi	Yamaha	12	2	4	9	16	6	18	10					60
11	(Philippines) John Emerson Inguito	Yamaha	15	14	19	Ret	8	1	3	Ret	Ret	Ret			52
12	(Indonesia) Arai Agaska Dibani Laksana	Yamaha							4	1	15	12	10	13	52
13	(Indonesia) Fahmi Basam	Yamaha					14	Ret	17	9	8	4	6	7	49
14	(Thailand) Peerapong Luiboonpeng	Yamaha					10	5	Ret	18	10	8	7	15	41
15	(Philippines) April King Mascardo	Yamaha	9	8	Ret	6	DNS	DNS	11	Ret	16	Ret	12	9	41
16	(Malaysia) Ahmad Fazrul Sham	Yamaha	18	Ret	Ret	5	13	Ret	Ret	16	2	10	Ret	Ret	40
17	(Malaysia) Izam Ikmal	Honda	17	9	6	10	12	DSQ	15	Ret	12	14	17	19	34
18	(Philippines) Gian Carlo Mauricio	Yamaha	19	Ret	11	Ret	6	Ret	24	17	17	13	5	14	31
19	(Malaysia) Shahrol Syazras	Honda	16	11	5	15	19	8	25	Ret	Ret	16	13	17	28
20	(Malaysia) Haziq Hamdan	Honda	10	15	14	16	18	13	27	5	13	18	Ret	DNS	26
21	(Indonesia) Aditya Fauzi	Yamaha							7	4					22
22	(Indonesia) Reynaldi Pradana	Yamaha	11	4	17	14									20
23	(Thailand) Passkon Sanluang	Yamaha	Ret	18	13	21	21	10	20	13	14	11	15	18	20
24	(Thailand) Pacharagorn Thonggerdloung	Honda	DNS	17	16	18	20	9	Ret	11	18	15	Ret	12	17
25	(Indonesia) Husni Zainul Fuadzi	Yamaha							Ret	3					16
26	(Malaysia) Ahmad Fazli Sham	Yamaha	4	16	Ret	13	24	DNS	Ret	16					16
27	(Vietnam) Nguyen Anh Tuan	Honda	20	21	9	19	17	7	21	Ret	20	17	18	16	16
28	(Indonesia) Dimas Juli Atmoko	Yamaha	Ret	20	7	11	15	Ret	Ret	Ret					15
29	(Malaysia) Ahmad Afif Amran	Yamaha									11	7	Ret	20	14
30	(Indonesia) Rio Andriyanto	Yamaha							9	15					8
31	(Indonesia) Gilang Akbar Roland	Yamaha							10	Ret					6
32	(Malaysia) Arash Tsunami Kamarudin	Yamaha					22	11							5
33	(Malaysia) Iqbal Amri	Yamaha			15	12									5
34	(Indonesia) Ilham Effendi	Honda							22	12					4
35	(Malaysia) Shafiq Ezzariq	Yamaha			12	Ret									4
36	(Vietnam) Nguyen Huu Tri	Honda	DNS	22	18	20	23	14	26	Ret	21	20	19	21	2
37	(Malaysia) Norhakim Norhafizullah	Yamaha							Ret	Ret	19	Ret			0
38	(Thailand) Worapot Thongdonmaun	Yamaha							19	Ret					0
39	(Indonesia) Aldiaz Aqsal Ismaya	Yamaha							23	Ret					0
40	(Thailand) Kantapat Yabkanthai	Yamaha											Ret	Ret	0
Pos.	Rider	Bike	CHA (Thailand)		SEP (Malaysia)		SUG (Japan)		MAN (Indonesia)		ZHU (China)		CHA (Thailand)		Pts

Colour	Result
Gold	Winner
Silver	Second place
Bronze	Third place
Green	Points classification
Blue	Non-points classification
Blue	Non-classified finish (NC)
Purple	Retired, not classified (Ret)
Red	Did not qualify (DNQ)
Red	Did not pre-qualify (DNPQ)
Black	Disqualified (DSQ)
White	Did not start (DNS)
White	Withdrew (WD)
White	Race cancelled (C)
Blank	Did not practice (DNP)
Blank	Did not arrive (DNA)
Blank	Excluded (EX)

**Bold** – Pole position
Italics – Fastest lap

==== TVS Asia One Make Championship ====
Pos.	Rider	Bike	CHA (Thailand)		SEP (Malaysia)		SUG (Japan)		MAN (Indonesia)		ZHU (China)		CHA (Thailand)		Pts
Pos.	Rider	Bike	R1	R2	R1	R2	R1	R2	R1	R2	R1	R2	R1	R2	Pts
1	(Malaysia) Muzakkir Mohamed	TVS Apache RR310	5	4	1	2	4	6	6	10	**2**	**2**	2	2	188
2	(Japan) Hiroki Ono	TVS Apache RR310					**1**	**Ret**	**1**	**1**	1	1	**1**	**1**	175
3	(Thailand) Vorapong Malahuan	TVS Apache RR310	1	1	5	3	13	4	4	2	Ret	12	3	3	162
4	(Malaysia) Ramdan Rosli	TVS Apache RR310	Ret	Ret	**2**	**1**	3	1	3	3	Ret	3	5	4	158
5	(Indonesia) Decky Tiarno Aldy	TVS Apache RR310	8	3	4	5	2	2	5	4	8	8	7	7	146
6	(Thailand) Piyawat Patoomyos	TVS Apache RR310	**2**	**12**	3	4	6	5	9	8	4	5	12	6	127
7	(Japan) Taiyo Sato	TVS Apache RR310	3	7	7	10			2	5	3	4	8	12	112
8	(Japan) Fugo Tanaka	TVS Apache RR310	11	2	6	7	5	3	10	14			Ret	10	85
9	(Singapore) Arsyad Rusydi	TVS Apache RR310	Ret	9	11	9	7	7	8	7	10	7	11	9	81
10	(India) KY Ahmed	TVS Apache RR310	6	8	9	8	11	8	14	12	5	Ret	10	13	72
11	(Thailand) Daranpob Thongyoy	TVS Apache RR310	9	6	12	Ret	9	10	11	11	9	6	13	11	69
12	(Philippines) Kerwin Eins Chang	TVS Apache RR310	4	Ret	8	6	12	Ret	12	9	Ret	9	14	Ret	55
13	(Indonesia) Rusman Fadhil	TVS Apache RR310							7	6	6	10	6	8	53
14	(India) Jagan Kumar	TVS Apache RR310	7	5	10	Ret	8	Ret	15	15					36
15	(India) Chiranth Vishwanath	TVS Apache RR310			14	13	Ret	11	13	13	7	Ret	9	14	34
16	(India) Sarthak Chavan	TVS Apache RR310											4	5	24
17	(India) Deepak Ravikumar	TVS Apache RR310	10	10	13	11									20
18	(Indonesia) Louis Abelhard	TVS Apache RR310	12	11	Ret	12									13
19	(Japan) Miu Nakahara	TVS Apache RR310					10	9							13
20	(China) Zhouran Jiang	TVS Apache RR310									11	11			10
Pos.	Rider	Bike	CHA (Thailand)		SEP (Malaysia)		SUG (Japan)		MAN (Indonesia)		ZHU (China)		CHA (Thailand)		Pts

Colour	Result
Gold	Winner
Silver	Second place
Bronze	Third place
Green	Points classification
Blue	Non-points classification
Blue	Non-classified finish (NC)
Purple	Retired, not classified (Ret)
Red	Did not qualify (DNQ)
Red	Did not pre-qualify (DNPQ)
Black	Disqualified (DSQ)
White	Did not start (DNS)
White	Withdrew (WD)
White	Race cancelled (C)
Blank	Did not practice (DNP)
Blank	Did not arrive (DNA)
Blank	Excluded (EX)

**Bold** – Pole position
Italics – Fastest lap

=== Teams' standings ===
The teams' standings are based on results obtained by regular and substitute riders; wild-card entries were ineligible.

==== Asia Superbike 1000 ====
Pos.	Team	Bike No.	CHA (Thailand)		SEP (Malaysia)		SUG (Japan)		MAN (Indonesia)		ZHU (China)		CHA (Thailand)		Pts.
Pos.	Team	Bike No.	R1	R2	R1	R2	R1	R2	R1	R2	R1	R2	R1	R2	Pts.
1	ONEXOX BMW TKKR Team	25	2	3	2	3	Ret	11	5	C	3	3			313
1	ONEXOX BMW TKKR Team	28	4	6	**1**	**1**	2	1	**1**	C	**1**	**1**			313
2	Honda Asia-Dream Racing with SHOWA	1	**3**	**2**	3	5	11	3	3	C	2	2			267
2	Honda Asia-Dream Racing with SHOWA	23	5	4	5	4	4	2	2	C	4	4			267
3	YAMAHA GEN BLU Racing Team ASEAN	27	8	7	6	7	1	Ret	6	C	8	7			169
3	YAMAHA GEN BLU Racing Team ASEAN	76					5	6	8	C	5	5			169
4	SDG MS HARC-PRO Honda Philippines	73	1	1	4	2	**7**	**Ret**	4	C					105
5	EEST NJT Racing Team	91	7	11	11	9	13	12	9	C	6	6			60
6	Astemo SI Racing with Thai Honda	96	6	5	10	6									37
7	Evolution Sports Group	83	Ret	9	7	DNS	12	DNS	7	C	9	Ret			36
8	Victor Racing MLT Yamaha	13	10	Ret	8	Ret	Ret	7							29
8	Victor Racing MLT Yamaha	44							10	C	DNS	DNS			29
9	Savitar Team Asia	16	11	10	12	Ret	15	Ret	11	C	DNS	DNS			21
Pos.	Team	Bike No.	CHA (Thailand)		SEP (Malaysia)		SUG (Japan)		MAN (Indonesia)		ZHU (China)		CHA (Thailand)		Pts.

==== Supersports 600 ====
Pos.	Team	Bike No.	CHA (Thailand)		SEP (Malaysia)		SUG (Japan)		MAN (Indonesia)		ZHU (China)		CHA (Thailand)		Pts.
Pos.	Team	Bike No.	R1	R2	R1	R2	R1	R2	R1	R2	R1	R2	R1	R2	Pts.
1	Boon Siew Honda Racing Team A	20	Ret	5	1	Ret	5	Ret	13	4	1	Ret			237
1	Boon Siew Honda Racing Team A	32	3	9	3	2	4	3	**1**	**Ret**	**2**	**3**			237
2	Honda Racing Thailand	15	Ret	6	9	6	9	10	9	Ret	10	4			222
2	Honda Racing Thailand	41	2	1	4	3	3	DSQ	6	2	5	1			222
3	YAMAHA GEN BLU Racing Team ASEAN	22	6	3	5	7	2	4	3	1	3	2			213
3	YAMAHA GEN BLU Racing Team ASEAN	66							10	7	6	8			213
4	Boon Siew Honda Racing Team B	89	**1**	**2**	**2**	**1**	13	1	2	8	4	12			163
5	ONEXOX TKKR Racing Team	51	4	4	7	5	1	2	4	5		6			135
5	ONEXOX TKKR Racing Team	57					Ret	6							135
6	ASTRA Honda Racing Team	21	8	8	6	12	Ret	11	7	3	8	5			125
6	ASTRA Honda Racing Team	93							5	6					125
7	Yamaha Racing Indonesia	99	9	Ret	Ret	9	8	9	8	Ret	7	7			97
7	Yamaha Racing Indonesia	108	Ret	10	10	11	12	Ret	14	9	11	9			97
8	Yamaha Thailand Racing Team	56	7	7	8	4	10	12	12	Ret	9	Ret			60
9	Victor Racing MLT Yamaha	222	10	12	12	13	Ret	DNS	15	10					24
Pos.	Team	Bike No.	CHA (Thailand)		SEP (Malaysia)		SUG (Japan)		MAN (Indonesia)		ZHU (China)		CHA (Thailand)		Pts.

==== AP 250 ====
Pos.	Team	Bike No.	CHA (Thailand)		SEP (Malaysia)		SUG (Japan)		MAN (Indonesia)		ZHU (China)		CHA (Thailand)		Pts.
Pos.	Team	Bike No.	R1	R2	R1	R2	R1	R2	R1	R2	R1	R2	R1	R2	Pts.
1	ASTRA Honda Racing Team A	46	**3**	**Ret**	1	2	4	1	**1**	**1**	Ret	3			353
1	ASTRA Honda Racing Team A	123	1	1	**2**	**3**	1	5	4	2	2	4			353
2	Honda Racing Thailand	11	Ret	8	Ret	8	8	17	8	16	5	5			177
2	Honda Racing Thailand	44	4	3	Ret	11	2	Ret	21	Ret	1	6			177
3	Motul Sniper Manual Tech	16	5	DSQ	8	4	7	9	25	3	8	9			170
3	Motul Sniper Manual Tech	37	9	5	5	5	23	2	10	6	7	10			170
4	ASTRA Honda Racing Team B	54	2	9	3	1	3	3			**6**	**1**			155
4	ASTRA Honda Racing Team B	212							7	5					155
5	Yamaha Racing Indonesia	36	13	Ret	6	7	**5**	**Ret**	5	Ret	4	7			123
5	Yamaha Racing Indonesia	89	12	Ret	12	16	9	4	3	4	Ret	Ret			123
6	Idemitsu Boon Siew Honda Racing Team	19	14	15	9	9	11	Ret	15	8	9	14			88
6	Idemitsu Boon Siew Honda Racing Team	41	10	6	7	6	15	13	13	11	Ret	15			88
7	EEST NJT Racing Team	25	11	10	10	15	17	7	Ret	13	11	16			73
7	EEST NJT Racing Team	94	6	7	DNS		12	Ret	17	12	10	11			73
8	Honda Racing Vietnam Team	65	8	4	11	10	13	6	6	18	Ret	8			68
8	Honda Racing Vietnam Team	193	20	Ret	16	17	21	Ret	20	15	12	17			68
9	Honda Racing India	17	19	13	17	Ret			22	19	17	18			27
9	Honda Racing India	50	15	11	14	Ret	18	8	16	14	14	12			27
10	SDG MS Harc-Pro Honda Philippines	27	17	12	Ret	18	16	12	19	Ret					14
10	SDG MS Harc-Pro Honda Philippines	79					10	Ret							14
11	Victor Racing MLT Yamaha	95			15	14	14	11	Ret	Ret	18	19			10
11	Victor Racing MLT Yamaha	15			18	19	22	16	24	20	16	Ret			10
Pos.	Team	Bike No.	CHA (Thailand)		SEP (Malaysia)		SUG (Japan)		MAN (Indonesia)		ZHU (China)		CHA (Thailand)		Pts.

==== UB 150 ====
Pos.	Team	Bike No.	CHA (Thailand)		SEP (Malaysia)		SUG (Japan)		MAN (Indonesia)		ZHU (China)		CHA (Thailand)		Pts.
Pos.	Team	Bike No.	R1	R2	R1	R2	R1	R2	R1	R2	R1	R2	R1	R2	Pts.
1	UMA Racing YAMAHA Maju Motor Asia	17	2	7	Ret	17	9	Ret	13	Ret					175
1	UMA Racing YAMAHA Maju Motor Asia	87	5	12	10	1	**1**	**2**	1	2					175
2	ONEXOX TKKR Racing Team	24	**7**	**1**	Ret	3	7	Ret	14	7					141
2	ONEXOX TKKR Racing Team	122	1	13	Ret	2	11	Ret	6	8					141
3	4S1M EVO YAMAHA Racing Team	22	15	14	19	Ret	8	1	3	Ret					131
3	4S1M EVO YAMAHA Racing Team	23	13	6	3	8	3	3	8	14					131
4	Cardinals Factory Racing Team ARRC	13	6	19	8	7			2	6					122
4	Cardinals Factory Racing Team ARRC	98	12	2	4	9	16	6	18	10					122
5	LFN H. Putra 969 Indonesia Racing Team	157	14	5	2	4	4	4	16	20					101
5	LFN H. Putra 969 Indonesia Racing Team	222					14	Ret	17	9					101
6	PitsBike JRT Tech 2 OneWay Racing Team	11	18	Ret	Ret	5	13	Ret	Ret	16					86
6	PitsBike JRT Tech 2 OneWay Racing Team	38	3	3	**1**	**Ret**	5	Ret	12	19					86
7	Racetech Sixty Racing	60	8	10	Ret	Ret	2	12	5	Ret					71
7	Racetech Sixty Racing	177							7	4					71
8	Estremo Yuzy Honda Team A	78	10	15	14	16	18	13	27	5					48
8	Estremo Yuzy Honda Team A	61	16	11	5	15	19	8	25	Ret					48
9	UMA Racing MMR YAMAHA Philippines	27	19	Ret	11	Ret	6	Ret	24	17					45
9	UMA Racing MMR YAMAHA Philippines	43	9	8	Ret	6	DNS	DNS	11	Ret					45
10	Estremo Yuzy Honda Team B	32	DNS	17	16	18	20	9	Ret	11					40
10	Estremo Yuzy Honda Team B	71	17	9	6	10	12	DSQ	15	Ret					40
11	One For All	53	Ret	18	13	21	21	10	20	13					29
11	One For All	14					10	5	Ret	18					29
12	Honda Racing Vietnam Team	111	DNS	22	18	20	23	14	26	Ret					18
12	Honda Racing Vietnam Team	178	20	21	9	19	17	7	21	Ret					18
Pos.	Team	Bike No.	CHA (Thailand)		SEP (Malaysia)		SUG (Japan)		MAN (Indonesia)		ZHU (China)		CHA (Thailand)		Pts.

=== Manufacturers' standings ===
Each constructor is awarded the same number of points as their best placed rider

==== ASBK 1000 ====
Pos.	Manufacturer	CHA (Thailand)		SEP (Malaysia)		SUG (Japan)		MAN (Indonesia)		ZHU (China)		CHA (Thailand)		Pts.
1	(Germany) BMW	2	3	1	1	2	1	1	C	1	1	2	1	256
2	(Japan) Honda	1	1	3	2	4	2	2	C	2	2	1	2	224
3	(Japan) Yamaha	8	7	6	7	1	5	6	C	5	5	7	7	122
Pos.	Manufacturer	CHA (Thailand)		SEP (Malaysia)		SUG (Japan)		MAN (Indonesia)		ZHU (China)		CHA (Thailand)		Pts.

==== Supersports 600 ====
Pos.	Manufacturer	CHA (Thailand)		SEP (Malaysia)		SUG (Japan)		MAN (Indonesia)		ZHU (China)		CHA (Thailand)		Pts.
1	(Japan) Honda	1	1	1	1	3	1	1	2	1	1	3	3	268
2	(Japan) Yamaha	4	3	5	4	1	2	3	1	3	2	1	1	225
Pos.	Manufacturer	CHA (Thailand)		SEP (Malaysia)		SUG (Japan)		MAN (Indonesia)		ZHU (China)		CHA (Thailand)		Pts.

==== Asia Production 250 ====
Pos.	Manufacturer	CHA (Thailand)		SEP (Malaysia)		SUG (Japan)		MAN (Indonesia)		ZHU (China)		CHA (Thailand)	Pts.
1	(Japan) Honda	1	1	1	1	1	1	1	1	1	1		250
2	(Japan) Kawasaki	5	5	5	4	7	2	10	3	7	9		113
3	(Japan) Yamaha	12	Ret	6	7	5	4	2	4	4	7		102
Pos.	Manufacturer	CHA (Thailand)		SEP (Malaysia)		SUG (Japan)		MAN (Indonesia)		ZHU (China)		CHA (Thailand)	Pts.

==== Underbone 150 ====
Pos.	Manufacturer	CHA (Thailand)		SEP (Malaysia)		SUG (Japan)		MAN (Indonesia)		ZHU (China)		CHA (Thailand)	Pts.
1	(Japan) Yamaha	1	1	1	1	1	1	1	1	1	1		250
2	(Japan) Honda	10	9	5	10	12	7	7	5	12	14		69
Pos.	Manufacturer	CHA (Thailand)		SEP (Malaysia)		SUG (Japan)		MAN (Indonesia)		ZHU (China)		CHA (Thailand)	Pts.
