= Keito Abe =

Japanese motorcycle racer (born 2003)

Keito Abe 阿部 恵斗
- Born: 13 September 2003 (age 23); Akishima, Tokyo, Japan
- Nationality: Japanese
- Current team: SDG Harc-Pro
- Bike number: 39

Championship titles
- All Japan ST600 (2023, 2024)
Statistics
ARRC ASB1000
Active years	2025–
Championships	0
Manufacturer	Honda (2025–)
Last season (2025)	3rd (170 pts)
Starts / Wins / Podiums / Poles / F. laps / Points; 22 / 1 / 16 / 1 / 1 / 358
All Japan JSB1000
Active years	2025
Championships	0
Manufacturer	Honda
Team(s)	SDG Harc-Pro
Last season (2025)	17th (26 pts)
Starts / Wins / Podiums / Poles / F. laps / Points; 3 / 0 / 0 / 0 / 0 / 26
All Japan ST600
Active years	2020–2024
Championships	2
Manufacturer	Yamaha
Team(s)	Team Norick, 51 Garage
Best season (2024)	1st (5 wins, 112.5 pts)
Starts / Wins / Podiums / Poles / F. laps / Points; 27 / 7 / 14 / 9 / 3 / 434.5
ARRC SS600
Active years	2022–2023
Championships	0
Manufacturer	Yamaha
Team(s)	Onexox TKKR
Best season (2023)	5th (145 pts)
Starts / Wins / Podiums / Poles / F. laps / Points; 17 / 1 / 3 / 0 / 0 / 181
All Japan J-GP2
Active years	2018–2019
Championships	0
Manufacturer	Yamaha
Team(s)	Team Norick
Best season (2019)	8th (93 pts)
Starts / Wins / Podiums / Poles / F. laps / Points; 12 / 0 / 0 / 0 / 0 / 141

Keito Abe (Japanese: 阿部 恵斗, Hepburn: Abe Keito; born 13 September 2003) is a Japanese motorcycle racer who competes in the ASB1000 class of the Asia Road Racing Championship for SDG Harc-Pro.

Abe is a two-time All Japan Road Race ST600 champion, having claimed the title in 2023 and 2024. He has also raced in the JSB1000—the top class of the All Japan—as a replacement rider in the final two rounds of 2025.

== Early and personal life ==
Born in Akishima, Tokyo, Abe started riding motorcycles at the age of four. He later moved to mini bikes in 2012, aged nine, and entered the Team Norick program—a young rider development ladder originally started by Norifumi Abe. In the following years, he competed in the S80 class in the Tsukuba Road Race Championship, and ultimately moved to a TZ 250 in the J-GP3 class of the same championship in 2015, where he ranked second.

He is not related to Norifumi Abe.

== Career ==
=== All Japan Road Race Championship ===
==== J-GP2 (2018–2019) ====
Abe entered the All Japan Road Race Championship in 2018, aged 14. He was given a spot in the J-GP2 class aboard a Yamaha YN6 prototype, racing for Team Norick. He finished his rookie season in fourteenth place after a best place finish of eleventh at Sportsland Sugo. In 2019, Abe faced his second year in the J-GP2, where he clinched top-ten finishes in all races and finished in fifth place at Tsukuba and Suzuka. He finished the season in eighth place in the championship standings.

==== ST600 (2020–2024) ====
After the J-GP2 class had folded at the end of 2019, Abe moved categories to ST600 for 2020, racing with the same Team Norick aboard a production YZF-R6. He had a strong rookie season where he clinched top-ten finishes, with a best place result of fifth at Sugo and later at Motegi, including a maiden pole position in the latter. His final position in the standings was eighth again. In 2021, Abe faced his second running in the ST600 class, still under the Team Norick umbrella. He clinched his maiden podium in the sixth at Okayama, with a third place finish after achieving pole position the day before. He would go on to close off the season with another podium at Autopolis, this time with a second place after beating Haruki Noguchi in a final lap battle.

Abe left the Norick program at the end of 2021 and switched to Team 51 Garage for the 2022 season onwards. That year he clinched his maiden win at Autopolis, after a last lap battle with Kohta Arakawa and Shota Ite. He claimed a second podium in the following round at Okayama and finished the season in third place overall. In 2023, Abe claimed his first All Japan title in the ST600 class, after finishing on the podium in every race and winning the first header at Sugo. He was officially proclaimed champion in the final round at Suzuka after finishing in front of his teammate and championship contender Sho Nishimura.

In 2024, Abe faced his fifth and final ST600 season. He dominated the championship by winning five races and four pole positions in a row, and was crowned ST600 champion for a second time—in the penultimate round at Okayama. Shortly before the final round at Suzuka, Abe's team decided not to participate in the event following the unexpected death of the team director Takahiro Sohwa.

==== JSB1000 (2025) ====
Abe debuted in the All Japan Road Race Championship's top class JSB1000 in 2025, with SDG Harc-Pro. He replaced the injured Teppei Nagoe and participated in the final two rounds of the season at Okayama and Suzuka. His best result was a fifth place in the second header of the Suzuka round.

=== Asia Road Racing Championship ===
==== SS600 (2022–2023) ====
Abe entered the Supersport class of the 2022 Asia Road Racing Championship for three rounds at Sugo, Sepang and Buriram. He clinched a podium in his debut race at Sugo and would later grab two more top-ten finishes in the following two rounds. In 2023, Abe entered his first Asia Road Racing Championship full-time season. In the first two rounds at Buriram and Sepang, he claimed several top-five finishes, and clinched his maiden win in the first header of the Sugo round. He finished in second place in Race 2. He ended the season with more top-five finishes and placed fifth in the championship standings.

==== ASB1000 (2025–present) ====
After his success in the All Japan, Abe returned to the Asia Road Racing Championship in 2025, this time debuting in the top class ASB1000 with SDG Harc-Pro. He made the jump to a Honda CBR1000RR-R, after competing on Yamaha machines for most of his early career. He claimed a podium in his debut round at Buriram, after finishing in third place. In his home round at Motegi, Abe won the first race and finished second in the next one, which put him as championship leader for the first time. He claimed another second place in the following round at Mandalika, but lost the championship lead following a crash at Sepang. Abe ultimately placed third in the overall championship standings at the end of the season.

Abe entered his second ASB1000 season with SDG Harc-Pro in 2026. In the opening round at Sepang he clinched two podiums, finishing second in both races and fending off Andi Izdihar by six milliseconds in Race 2.

=== Suzuka 8 Hours ===
In 2025, Abe competed in the Suzuka 8 Hours endurance race for the first time. He entered the event with SDG Harc-Pro, alongside Yuki Kunii and Teppei Nagoe. The team ran in third place for a big part of the race but ultimately finished in fourth place and missed the podium.

== Career statistics ==
=== All Japan Road Race Championship ===
==== Races by year ====
(key) (Races in bold indicate pole position; races in italics indicate fastest lap)

Year	Class	Bike	1	2	3	4	5	6	7	8	9	10	Pos	Pts
2018	J-GP2	Yamaha	MOT; 14	SUG; 11	TSU1; 15	TSU2; 16	AUT; 14	OKA; 11‡	SUZ; 16				14th	48
2019	J-GP2	Yamaha	MOT; DNS	SUG; 6	TSU1; 5	TSU2; 7	OKA; 7	AUT; 6	SUZ; 5				8th	93
2020	ST600	Yamaha	SUG; 5	OKA; C	AUT; 6	**MOT**; 5	SUZ; Ret						8th	47
2021	ST600	Yamaha	MOT; 6	SUG; 25	TSU1; Ret	TSU2; 4	SUZ; 6	**OKA**; 3	AUT; 2				5th	72
2022	ST600	Yamaha	MOT; 5	SUG1; 7	SUG2; 10	AUT; 1	**OKA**; 3	SUZ; 7					3rd	79
2023	ST600	Yamaha	MOT; 2	**SUG1**; 1	**SUG2**; 2	AUT; 2	OKA; 2	SUZ; 3					1st	124
2024	ST600	Yamaha	**MOT**; 1	**SUG1**; 1	**SUG2**; 1	**AUT**; 1‡	OKA; 1	SUZ					1st	112.5
2025	JSB1000	Honda	MOT	SUG1	SUG2	MOT1	MOT2	AUT1	AUT2	OKA; 19†	SUZ1; 7	SUZ2; 5	17th	26
2026	ST1000	Honda	SUG	AUT	MOT1	MOT2	OKA	SUZ; 2					14th	23

- † – Rider did not finish the race, but was classified as he completed more than ~75% of the race distance.
- ‡ – Half points were awarded based on the qualifying results.

=== Asia Road Racing Championship ===
==== Races by year ====
(key) (Races in bold indicate pole position; races in italics indicate fastest lap)

Year	Class	Bike	1		2		3		4		5		6		Pos	Pts
Year	Class	Bike	R1	R2	R1	R2	R1	R2	R1	R2	R1	R2	R1	R2	Pos	Pts
2022	SS600	Yamaha	BUR	BUR	SEP	SEP	SUG; 3	SUG; Ret	SEP; Ret	SEP; 9	BUR; 11	BUR; 8			12th	36
2023	SS600	Yamaha	BUR; 4	BUR; 4	SEP; 7	SEP; 5	SUG; 1	SUG; 2	MAN; 4	MAN; 5	ZHU; DNS	ZHU; 6	BUR; 7	BUR; 5	5th	145
2025	ASB1000	Honda	BUR; 5	BUR; 3	SEP; 4	SEP; 3	MOT; 1	MOT; 2	MAN; 9	MAN; 2	SEP; Ret	SEP; 4	**BUR**; 3	**BUR**; 4	3rd	170
2026	ASB1000	Honda	SEP; 2	SEP; 2	BUR; 3	BUR; 2	MOT; 2	MOT; 2	MAN; 2	MAN; 2	SEP; 3	SEP; 3	BUR	BUR	2nd*	188*

* Season still in progress.

=== Suzuka 8 Hours ===
Year	Class	Team	Co-riders	Bike	Pos
2025	**EWC**	(Japan) SDG Team Harc-Pro Honda	(Japan) Yuki Kunii (Japan) Teppei Nagoe	CBR1000RR-R	4th
2026	**EWC**	(Japan) SDG Team Harc-Pro Honda	(Japan) Yuki Kunii (Japan) Teppei Nagoe	CBR1000RR-R	8th
