= Yuki Kunii =

Japanese motorcycle racer

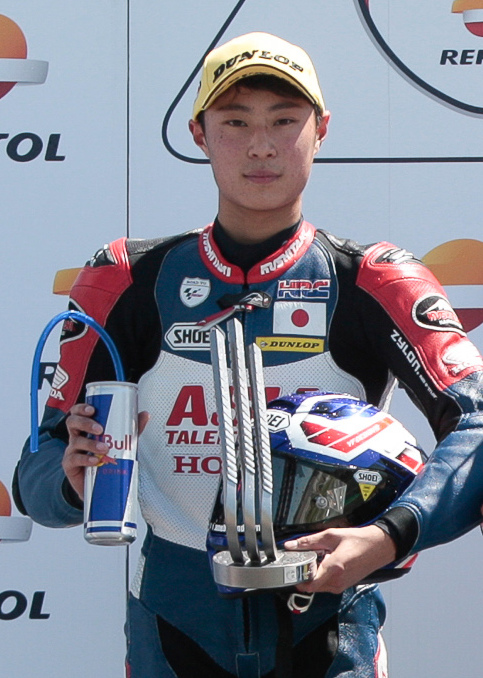
- Kunii in 2019
- Nationality: Japanese
- Born: 18 February 2003 (age 23); Setagaya, Japan
- Current team: SDG Team Harc-Pro Honda
- Bike number: 92
Motorcycle racing career statistics
Moto2 World Championship
Active years	2025
Manufacturers	Kalex
Championships	0
2025 championship position	30th (0 pts)
Starts / Wins / Podiums / Poles / F. laps / Points; 22 / 0 / 0 / 0 / 0 / 0
Moto3 World Championship
Active years	2019–2021
Manufacturers	Honda
Championships	0
2021 championship position	25th (15 pts)
Starts / Wins / Podiums / Poles / F. laps / Points; 31 / 0 / 0 / 0 / 0 / 15
Superbike World Championship
Active years	2026
Manufacturers	Honda (2026)
Championships	0
2026 championship position	30th (0 pts)
Starts / Wins / Podiums / Poles / F. laps / Points; 3 / 0 / 0 / 0 / 0 / 0
All Japan JSB1000
Active years	2026–
Manufacturers	Honda (2026–)
2026 championship position	4th (135 pts)
Starts / Wins / Podiums / Poles / F. laps / Points; 10 / 0 / 3 / 0 / 0 / 135
All Japan ST1000
Active years	2023–2024
Manufacturers	Honda
Championships	1
2024 championship position	1st (141 pts)
Starts / Wins / Podiums / Poles / F. laps / Points; 8 / 5 / 6 / 4 / 4 / 174
All Japan ST600
Active years	2022
Manufacturers	Honda
Championships	0
2022 championship position	8th (44 pts)
Starts / Wins / Podiums / Poles / F. laps / Points; 6 / 0 / 1 / 0 / 0 / 44

Yuki Kunii (Japanese: 國井 勇輝, Hepburn: Kunii Yūki; born 18 February 2003) is a Japanese Grand Prix motorcycle racer who competes in the All Japan JSB1000 class for SDG Team Harc-Pro Honda, aboard a Honda CBR1000RR-R.

Kunii previously competed for Idemitsu Honda Team Asia in the Moto2 and Moto3 World Championships in 2020, 2021 and ultimately 2025.

== Career statistics ==
=== Asia Talent Cup ===
==== Races by year ====
(key) (Races in bold indicate pole position; races in italics indicate fastest lap)

Year	Bike	1	2	3	4	5	6	7	8	9	10	11	12	Pos	Pts
2016	Honda	THA1; 6	THA2; 8	QAT1; 8	QAT2; 6	MAL1; 7	MAL2; 4	CHN1; 5	CHN2; 1	JPN1; 1	JPN2; Ret	SEP1; 3	SEP2; 9	6th	142
2017	Honda	THA1; 8	THA2; 5	QAT1; NC	QAT2; 1	SUZ1; 3	SUZ2; 1	MAL1	MAL2	JPN1; NC	JPN2; 1	SEP1; 3	SEP2; 3	5th	142

=== Red Bull MotoGP Rookies Cup ===
==== Races by year ====
(key) (Races in bold indicate pole position; races in italics indicate fastest lap)

Year	1	2	3	4	5	6	7	8	9	10	11	12	Pos	Pts
2018	JER1; 11	JER2; 6	ITA; 1	ASS	ASS	GER1	GER2	AUT; Ret	AUT; 9	MIS; Ret	ARA; 6	ARA; 4	9th	70
2019	**JER1**; 1	**JER2**; 2	**MUG**; Ret	ASS1; 7	ASS2; 6	**SAC1**; 2	**SAC2**; 1	RBR1	RBR2	MIS	ARA1	ARA2	7th	109

=== FIM CEV Moto3 Junior World Championship ===
==== Races by year ====
(key) (Races in bold indicate pole position, races in italics indicate fastest lap)

Year	Bike	1	2	3	4	5	6	7	8	9	10	11	12	Pos	Pts
2017	Honda	ALB; Ret	LMS; 7	CAT1; 5	CAT2; Ret	VAL1; 8	VAL2; 4	EST; Ret	JER1	JER1	ARA; 14	VAL1; 10	VAL2; 8	11th	57
2018	Honda	EST; 4	VAL1; 5	VAL2; 4	FRA; 5	CAT1; Ret	CAT2; 9	ARA; 11	JER1; 1	JER2; 4	ALB; 3	**VAL1**; Ret	**VAL2**; 5	6th	125
2019	Honda	EST; 18	**VAL1**; 1	**VAL2**; 2	**FRA**; 1	CAT1	CAT2	ARA; 4	JER1	JER2	ALB	VAL1; 6	VAL2; 9	7th	100

=== Grand Prix motorcycle racing ===
==== By season ====
Season	Class	Motorcycle	Team	Race	Win	Podium	Pole	FLap	Pts	Plcd
2019	Moto3	Honda	Honda Team Asia	1	0	0	0	0	0	NC
2020	Moto3	Honda	Honda Team Asia	15	0	0	0	0	0	27th
2021	Moto3	Honda	Honda Team Asia	15	0	0	0	0	15	25th
2025	Moto2	Kalex	Idemitsu Honda Team Asia	20	0	0	0	0	0	30th
Total				**51**	**0**	**0**	**0**	**0**	**15**	

==== By class ====
Class	Seasons	1st GP	1st pod	1st win	Race	Win	Podiums	Pole	FLap	Pts	WChmp
Moto3	2019–2021	2019 Czech Republic			31	0	0	0	0	15	0
Moto2	2025	2025 Thailand			20	0	0	0	0	0	0
Total	2019–2021, 2025				**51**	**0**	**0**	**0**	**0**	**15**	**0**

==== Races by year ====
(key) (Races in bold indicate pole position, races in italics indicate fastest lap)

Year	Class	Bike	1	2	3	4	5	6	7	8	9	10	11	12	13	14	15	16	17	18	19	20	21	22	Pos	Pts
2019	Moto3	Honda	QAT	ARG	AME	SPA	FRA	ITA	CAT	NED	GER	CZE; Ret	AUT	GBR	RSM	ARA	THA	JPN	AUS	MAL	VAL				NC	0
2020	Moto3	Honda	QAT; 18	SPA; Ret	ANC; 16	CZE; Ret	AUT; 26	STY; 22	RSM; 23	EMI; 25	CAT; 21	FRA; 20	ARA; 20	TER; 25	EUR; 17	VAL; 18	POR; 22								27th	0
2021	Moto3	Honda	QAT; 16	DOH; 15	POR; 16	SPA; 14	FRA; DNS	ITA	CAT; 12	GER; Ret	NED; 23	STY; 8	AUT; 18	GBR; 24	ARA; 17	RSM; EX	AME; 25	EMI; Ret	ALR; 20	VAL; Ret					25th	15
2025	Moto2	Kalex	THA; 19	ARG; 23	AME; 17	QAT; 24	SPA; 16	FRA; 22	GBR; 20	ARA; 22	ITA; 23	NED; Ret	GER; 19	CZE; 23	AUT; 24	HUN; Ret	CAT; 24	RSM; Ret	JPN; 18	INA; 18	AUS; 25	MAL; 20	POR; 23	VAL; 20	30th	0

=== All Japan Road Race Championship ===
==== Races by year ====
(key) (Races in bold indicate pole position; races in italics indicate fastest lap)

Year	Class	Bike	1	2	3	4	5	6	7	8	9	10	Pos	Pts
2022	ST600	Honda	MOT; 36†	SUG1; 22	SUG2; 11	AUT; 7	OKA; 5	SUZ; 3					8th	44
2023	ST1000	Honda	**MOT**; 2	SUG; 4	AUT1	AUT2	OKA	SUZ					10th	33
2024	ST1000	Honda	**MOT**; 1	SUG; 1	AUT1; 4	AUT2; 1	**OKA**; 1	**SUZ**; 1					1st	141
2026	JSB1000	Honda	MOT; 3	SUG1; 5	SUG2; 5	AUT1; 7	AUT2; 5	MOT1; 4	MOT2; 3	OKA; 2	SUZ1; 4	SUZ2; 7	4th	135

- † – Rider did not finish the race, but was classified as he completed more than 75% of the race distance.

=== Asia Road Racing Championship ===
==== Races by year ====
(key) (Races in bold indicate pole position, races in italics indicate fastest lap)

Year	Bike	1		2		3		4		5		6		Pos	Pts
Year	Bike	R1	R2	R1	R2	R1	R2	R1	R2	R1	R2	R1	R2	Pos	Pts
2023	Honda	CHA	CHA	SEP	SEP	SUG	SUG	MAN	MAN	ZHU	ZHU	CHA; 5	CHA; 6	16th	21
2024	Honda	CHA; 4	CHA; 4	ZHU; 4	ZHU; C	**MOT**; DNS	**MOT**; 1	MAN; 2	MAN; 8	SEP; 1	SEP; 1	CHA; 3	CHA; 1	1st	183

=== Suzuka 8 Hours ===
Year	Class	Team	Co-riders	Bike	Pos
2022	**EWC**	(Japan) Honda Dream RT Sakurai Honda	(Japan) Sodo Hamahara (Japan) Daijiro Hiura	Honda CBR1000RR-R	6th
2024	**EWC**	(Japan) SDG Team Harc-Pro Honda	(Indonesia) Mario Aji (Japan) Naomichi Uramoto	Honda CBR1000RR-R	9th
2025	**EWC**	(Japan) SDG Team Harc-Pro Honda	(Japan) Teppei Nagoe (Japan) Keito Abe	Honda CBR1000RR-R	4th
2026	**EWC**	(Japan) SDG Team Harc-Pro Honda	(Japan) Teppei Nagoe (Japan) Keito Abe	Honda CBR1000RR-R	8th

=== Superbike World Championship ===
==== Races by year ====
(key) (Races in bold indicate pole position; races in italics indicate fastest lap)

Year	Bike	1			2			3			4			5			6			7			8			9			10			11			12			Pos	Pts
Year	Bike	R1	SR	R2	R1	SR	R2	R1	SR	R2	R1	SR	R2	R1	SR	R2	R1	SR	R2	R1	SR	R2	R1	SR	R2	R1	SR	R2	R1	SR	R2	R1	SR	R2	R1	SR	R2	Pos	Pts
2026	Honda	AUS	AUS	AUS	POR	POR	POR	NED	NED	NED	HUN; 21	HUN; 21	HUN; 16	CZE	CZE	CZE	ARA	ARA	ARA	EMI	EMI	EMI	GBR	GBR	GBR	FRA	FRA	FRA	ITA	ITA	ITA	POR	POR	POR	SPA	SPA	SPA	30th	0

* Season still in progress.
