= Motorcycle Federation of Japan =

Governing body for two-wheeled motorsport in Japan

- Sport: Motorcycle sport
- Jurisdiction: Japan
- Abbreviation: MFJ
- Founded: 1961
- Affiliation: Fédération Internationale de Motocyclisme
- Headquarters: Tokyo, Japan

Official website
- www.mfj.or.jp

The Motorcycle Federation of Japan was established in 1961 as an organization concerning the sport of motorcycle racing in Japan. This organization is also affiliated with the Fédération Internationale de Motocyclisme.

The Motorcycle Federation of Japan is located in Tikuti Square Building, city of Chuo-ku in Tokyo, Japan.

The Motorcycle Federation of Japan is the only representative body in Japan that is a member of the International Federation of Motorcycles (FIM), which is the world governing body for motorcycle sports.

== See also ==
- List of FIM affiliated federations
