= List of cities in Saitama Prefecture by population =

The following list sorts all cities (including towns) in the Japanese prefecture of Saitama with a population of more than 10,000 according to the 2020 Census. As of October 1, 2020, 59 places fulfill this criterion and are listed here. This list refers only to the population of individual cities, towns and villages within their defined limits, which does not include other municipalities or suburban areas within urban agglomerations.

== List ==
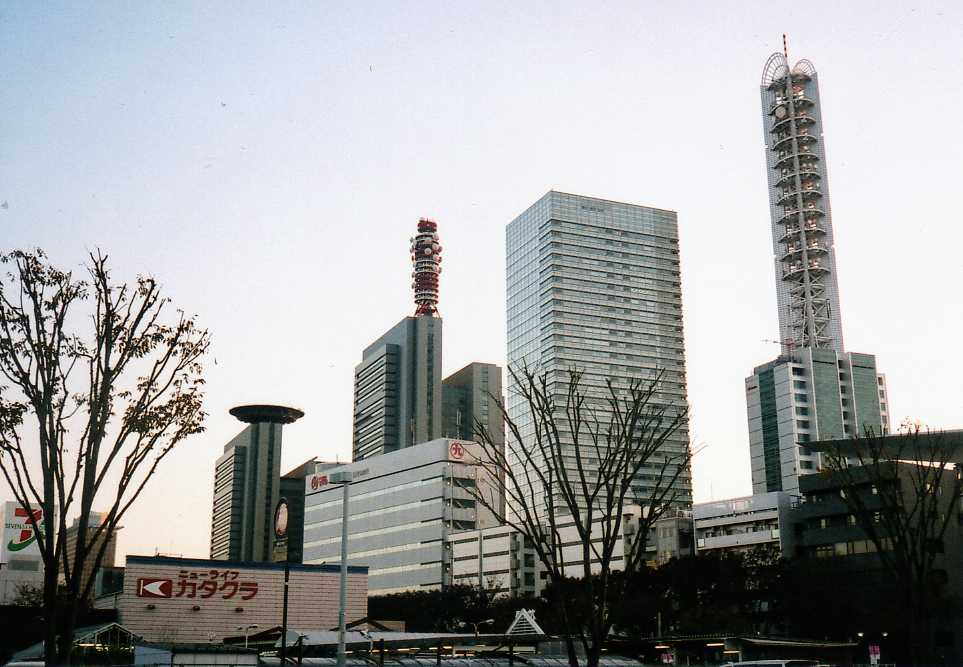
Saitama

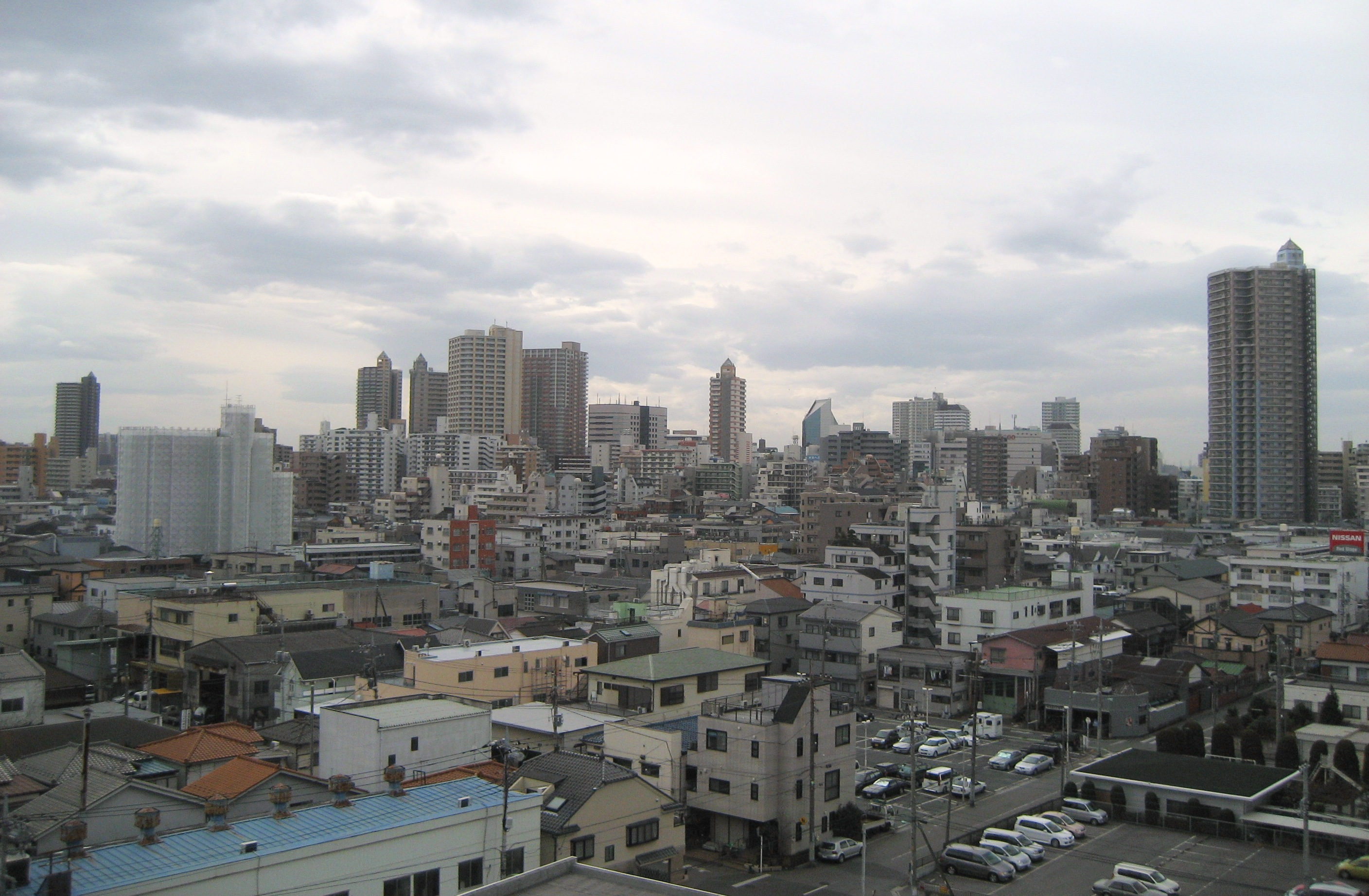
Kawaguchi

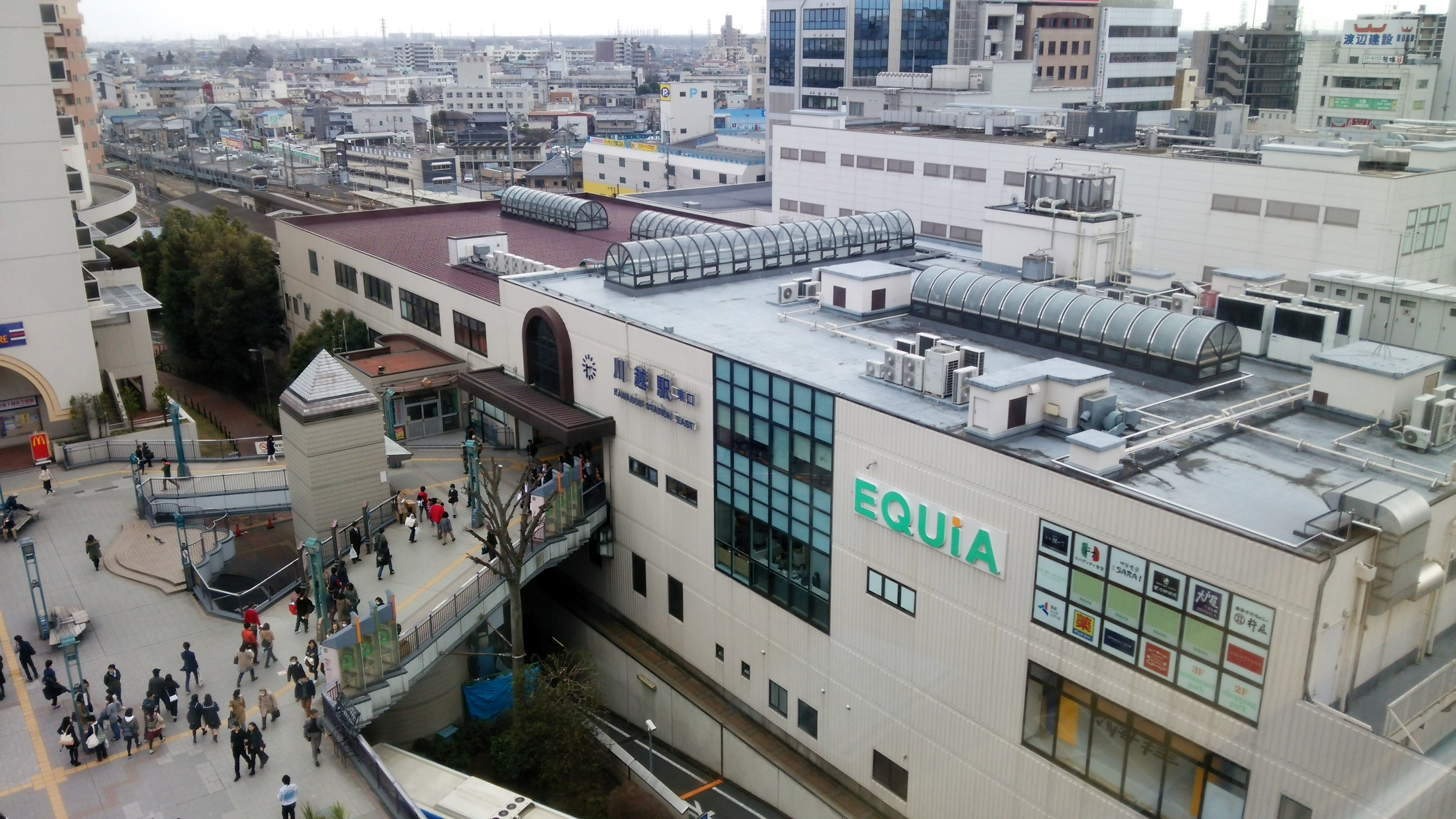
Kawagoe

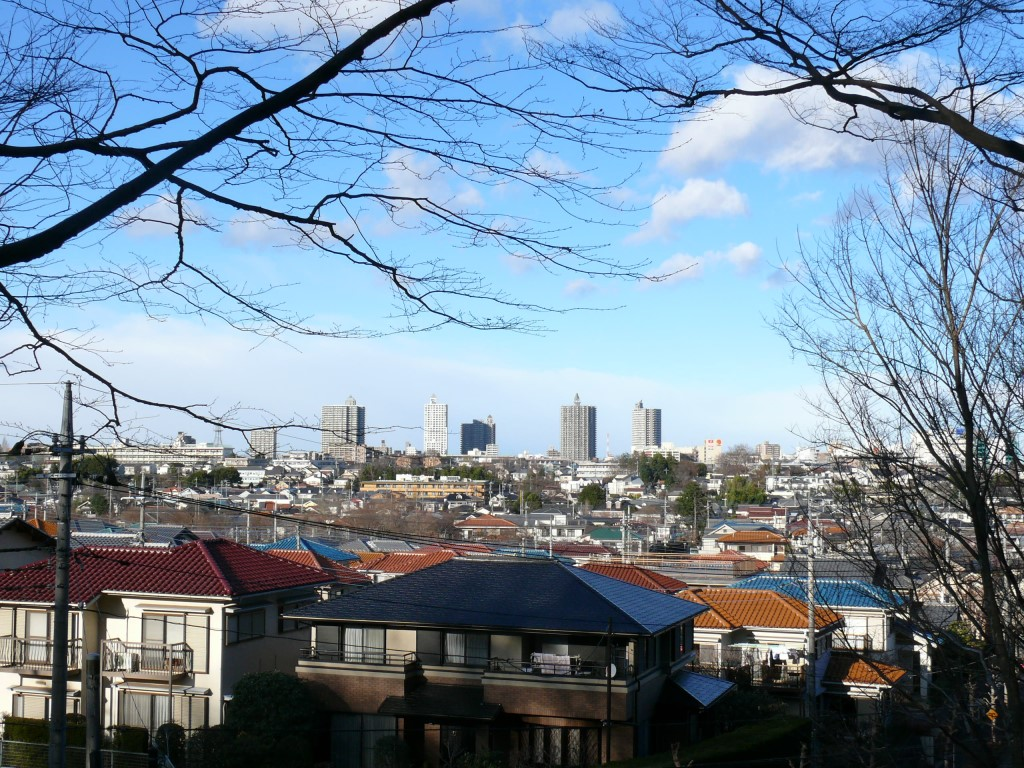
Tokorozawa

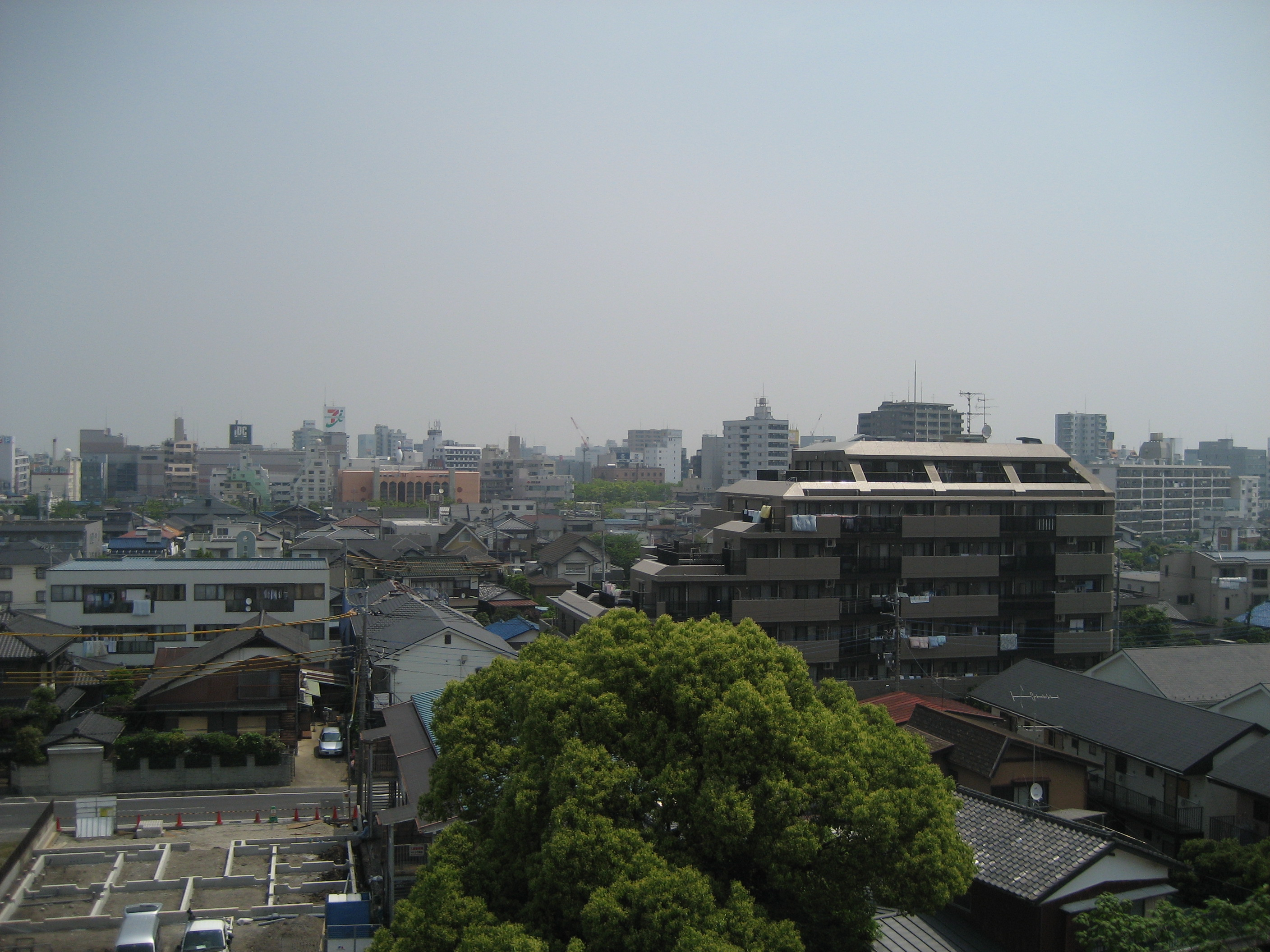
Kasukabe

The following table lists the 59 cities and towns in Saitama with a population of at least 10,000 on October 1, 2020, according to the 2020 Census. The table also gives an overview of the evolution of the population since the 1995 census.

Rank (2020)	Name	Status	2020	2015	2010	2005	2000	1995
1	Saitama	City	1,324,591	1,263,979	1,222,434	1,176,314	1,133,300	1,078,545
2	Kawaguchi	City	594,461	578,112	561,506	538,434	514,545	504,618
3	Kawagoe	City	354,680	350,745	342,670	333,795	330,766	323,353
4	Tokorozawa	City	342,535	340,386	341,924	336,100	330,100	320,406
5	Koshigaya	City	341,765	337,498	326,313	315,792	308,307	298,253
6	Sōka	City	248,037	247,034	243,855	236,316	225,018	217,930
7	Kasukabe	City	229,767	232,709	237,171	238,506	240,924	238,598
8	Ageo	City	227,020	225,196	223,926	220,232	212,947	206,090
9	Kumagaya	City	194,439	198,742	203,180	204,675	206,446	205,605
10	Niiza	City	166,104	162,122	158,777	153,305	149,511	144,726
11	Kuki	City	150,599	152,311	154,310	154,684	154,292	151,756
12	Sayama	City	148,712	152,405	155,727	158,074	161,460	162,240
13	Iruma	City	145,723	148,390	149,872	148,576	147,909	144,402
14	Misato	City	142,177	136,521	131,415	128,278	131,047	133,600
15	Fukaya	City	141,336	143,811	144,618	146,600	146,562	143,116
16	Asaka	City	141,036	136,299	129,691	124,393	119,712	110,789
17	Toda	City	140,868	136,150	123,079	116,696	108,039	97,571
18	Kōnosu	City	116,864	118,072	119,639	119,594	120,271	116,421
19	Fujimino	City	113,640	110,970	105,695	101,960	100,118	96,390
20	Fujimi	City	111,881	108,102	106,736	104,748	103,247	96,972
21	Kazo	City	111,702	112,229	115,002	115,497	117,777	115,198
22	Sakado	City	100,300	101,679	101,700	98,964	97,381	98,221
23	Yashio	City	93,412	86,717	82,977	75,507	74,954	75,322
24	Higashimatsuyama	City	91,838	91,437	90,099	91,302	92,929	93,342
25	Wakō	City	83,997	80,826	80,745	76,688	70,170	62,588
26	Hannō	City	80,391	80,715	83,549	84,860	85,886	83,278
27	Gyōda	City	78,671	82,113	85,786	88,815	90,530	90,427
28	Honjō	City	78,623	77,881	81,889	81,957	82,670	81,662
29	Shiki	City	75,377	72,676	69,611	67,448	65,076	64,430
30	Okegawa	City	74,778	73,936	74,711	73,677	73,967	73,084
31	Warabi	City	74,326	72,260	71,502	70,010	71,063	72,021
32	Yoshikawa	City	72,028	69,738	65,298	60,284	56,673	52,705
33	Tsurugashima	City	70,198	70,255	69,990	69,783	67,638	66,208
34	Kitamoto	City	65,228	67,409	68,888	70,126	69,524	69,929
35	Hasuda	City	61,530	62,380	63,309	63,474	64,386	63,920
36	Chichibu	City	59,706	63,555	66,955	70,563	73,875	75,618
37	Hidaka	City	54,591	56,520	57,473	53,619	53,758	54,884
38	Hanyū	City	52,879	54,874	56,204	56,693	57,499	56,035
39	Shiraoka	City	52,223	51,535	50,272	48,389	46,999	43,225
40	Satte	City	50,095	52,524	54,012	54,006	56,413	58,172
41	Ina	Town	44,848	44,442	42,494	36,535	32,216	29,792
42	Sugito	Town	43,860	45,495	46,923	46,646	47,336	45,051
43	Miyoshi	Town	38,452	38,456	38,706	37,050	35,752	35,607
44	Moroyama	Town	35,379	37,275	39,054	39,122	39,711	39,808
45	Miyashiro	Town	34,163	33,705	33,641	34,620	35,193	35,717
46	Yorii	Town	32,386	34,081	35,774	37,061	37,724	36,880
47	Kamisato	Town	30,347	30,565	30,998	30,855	30,126	28,514
48	Ogawa	Town	28,536	31,178	32,913	35,401	37,301	37,822
49	Matsubushi	Town	28,272	30,061	31,153	30,857	29,021	27,775
50	Namegawa	Town	19,682	18,212	17,323	15,434	12,836	12,484
51	Kawajima	Town	19,398	20,788	22,147	22,906	23,322	23,134
52	Yoshimi	Town	18,196	19,631	21,079	22,217	22,246	21,371
53	Ranzan	Town	17,904	18,341	18,887	19,479	19,816	19,706
54	Hatoyama	Town	13,581	14,338	15,305	15,985	17,008	17,973
55	Kamikawa	Town	13,380	13,730	14,470	15,062	15,197	14,414
56	Ogose	Town	11,042	11,716	12,537	13,356	13,718	13,609
57	Misato	Town	11,040	11,207	11,605	11,963	12,107	12,197
58	Ogano	Town	10,890	12,117	13,436	14,479	15,061	15,628
59	Tokigawa	Town	10,547	11,492	12,418	13,271	13,966	14,251
