= Tōyama Memorial Museum =

Museum in Japan

Tōyama Memorial Museum 遠山記念館
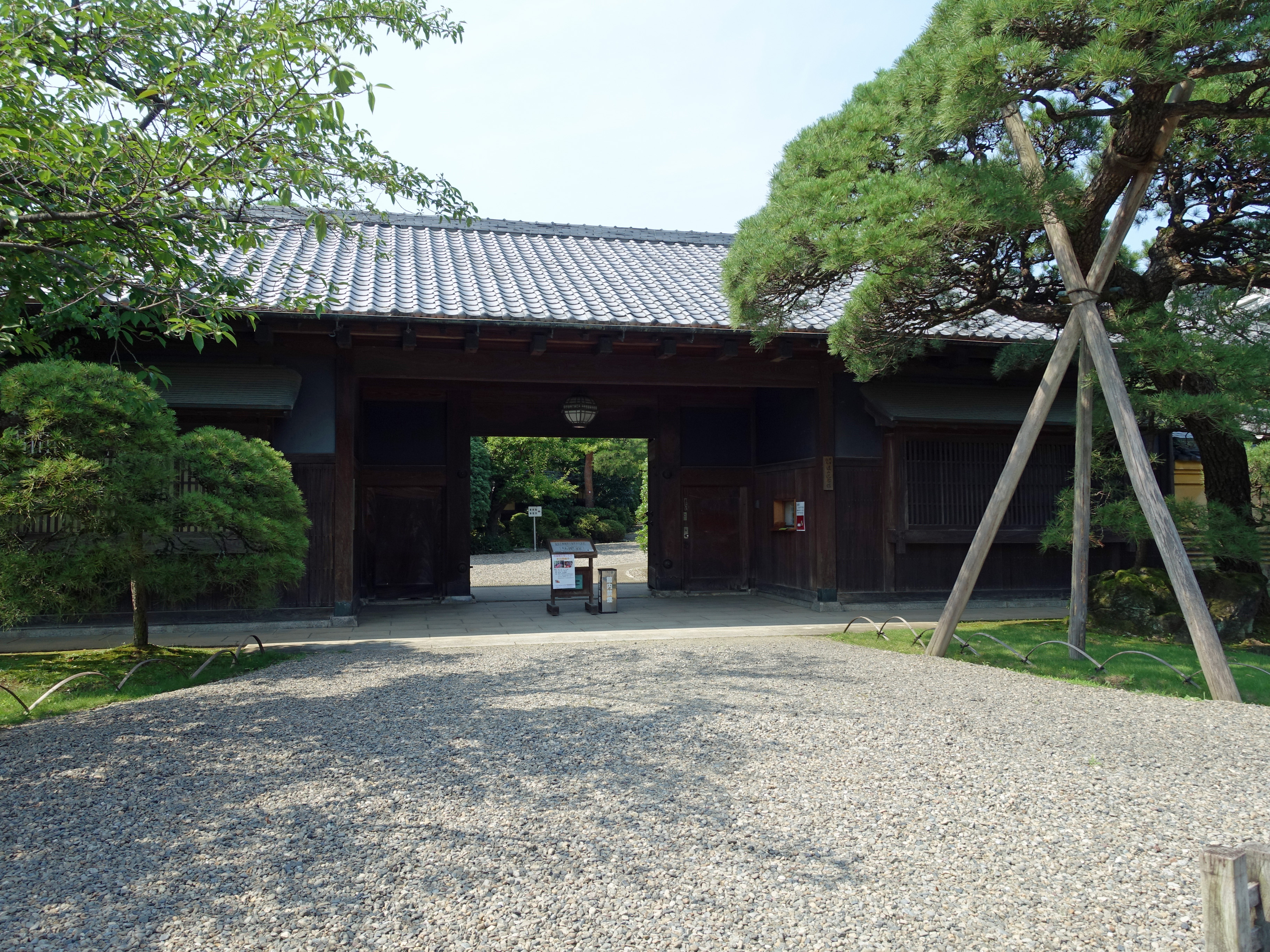
- Interactive map of the Tōyama Memorial Museum 遠山記念館 area

General information
- Location: 675 Shiroinuma, Kawajima, Saitama Prefecture, Japan
- Coordinates: 35°59′16″N 139°29′36″E
- Opened: 1970

Website
- Official website

Tōyama Memorial Museum (遠山記念館, Tōyama Kinenkan) opened in Kawajima, Saitama Prefecture, Japan, in 1970. The dedicated museum building is situated amongst those of the residence built by founder of Nikkō Securities Tōyama Genichi. The collection, his forming its core, includes six Important Cultural Properties.

== See also ==
- Saitama Prefectural Museum of History and Folklore
