= Fukiage =

Fukiage may refer to:

== Places ==
- Fukiage, Kagoshima (吹上町, Fukiage-chō), a town located in Hioki District, Kagoshima, Japan
- Fukiage, Saitama (吹上町; -machi), a town located in Kitaadachi District, Saitama, Japan
- Fukiage Garden, at the Tokyo Imperial Palace

== People ==
- Sataro Fukiage (1889–1926), Japanese rapist and serial killer
