= Saitama 6th district =

Constituency of the Diet of Japan

- Parliamentary constituency for the Japanese House of Representatives
- Numbered map of Saitama Prefecture single-member districts
- Prefecture: Saitama
- Proportional District: Northern Kanto
- Electorate: 414,632

Current constituency
- Created: 1994
- Seats: One
- Party: LDP
- Representative: Akihito Obana
- Municipalities: Ageo, Kitamoto, Kōnosu, and Okegawa.

Saitama 6th district (埼玉県第6区, Saitama-ken dai-rokku or simply 埼玉6区, Saitama-ken rokku ) is a single-member constituency of the House of Representatives in the national Diet of Japan located in Saitama Prefecture.

== Areas covered ==
=== since 2022 ===
- Ageo
- Kitamoto
- Kōnosu
- Okegawa

=== 2013 - 2022 ===
- Ageo
- Kitamoto
- Part of Kōnosu
- Okegawa
- Kita-Adachi District

=== 1994 - 2013 ===
- Ageo
- Kitamoto
- Kōnosu
- Okegawa
- Kita-Adachi District

== List of representatives ==
Election	Representative	Party	Notes
1996	Kaneshige Wakamatsu	New Frontier	
1996	Kaneshige Wakamatsu	Komeito	
2000	Atsushi Oshima	Democratic	
2003	Atsushi Oshima	Democratic	
2005	Atsushi Oshima	Democratic	
2009	Atsushi Oshima	Democratic	
2012	Kazuyuki Nakane	Liberal Democratic	
2014	Atsushi Oshima	Democratic	
2014	Atsushi Oshima	Democratic	
2017	Atsushi Oshima	Kibō no Tō	
2017	Atsushi Oshima	DPP	
2021	Atsushi Oshima	CDP	
2024	Atsushi Oshima	CDP	
2026	Akihito Obana	Liberal Democratic	

== Election results ==
=== 2026 ===
2026
Party	Candidate	Votes	%	±%
LDP	Akihito Obana	91,049	41.0	▲16.3
Centrist Reform	Atsushi Oshima (elected in N. Kanto PR)	81,509	36.7	▼14.6
Sanseitō	Yoshiko Nagashima	21,078	9.5	
JCP	Moe Akiyama	15.561	7.0	▼5.1
Ishin	Masanori Tsuda	12,958	5.8	▼6.1
Registered electors		411,950		
Turnout			54.78	▲3.24
LDP gain from Centrist Reform				

=== 2024 ===
2024
Party	Candidate	Votes	%	±%
CDP	Atsushi Oshima	104,836	51.31	▼4.71
Independent	Kazuyuki Nakane	50,425	24.68	new
Communist	Moe Akiyama	24,735	12.11	New
Innovation	Mieko Hosoya	24,341	11.91	New
Majority		54,411	26.45	▲14.41
Registered electors		412,325		
Turnout		204,337	51.54	▼3.78
LDP hold				

=== 2021 ===
2021
Party	Candidate	Votes	%	±%
CDP	Atsushi Oshima (incumbent)	134,281	56.02	New
Liberal Democratic (endorsed by Komeito)	Kazuyuki Nakane (PR seat incumbent) (won PR seat)	105,433	43.98	
Majority		28,848	12.04	
Registered electors		443,180		
Turnout			55.32	▲2.40
CDP hold				

=== 2017 ===
2017
Party	Candidate	Votes	%	±%
Kibō no Tō	Atsushi Oshima (incumbent)	106,448	46.75	New
Liberal Democratic (endorsed by Komeito)	Kazuyuki Nakane (PR seat incumbent) (won PR seat)	92,222	40.50	
Communist	Saichi Toguchi	29,020	12.75	
Majority		14,226	6.25	
Registered electors		440,900		
Turnout			52.92	▼1.13
Kibō no Tō hold				

=== 2014 ===
2014
Party	Candidate	Votes	%	±%
Democratic	Atsushi Oshima (PR seat incumbent)	103,918	46.18	
Liberal Democratic (endorsed by Komeito)	Kazuyuki Nakane (incumbent) (won PR seat)	94,303	41.90	
Communist	Saichi Toguchi	26,825	11.92	
Majority		9,615	4.28	
Registered electors		429,244		
Turnout			54.05	▼3.94
Democratic gain from LDP				

=== 2012 ===
2012
Party	Candidate	Votes	%	±%
Liberal Democratic (endorsed by Komeito)	Kazuyuki Nakane	90,871	37.94	
Democratic (endorsed by PNP)	Atsushi Oshima (incumbent) (won PR seat)	90,673	37.85	
Restoration	Kenji Isomura	35,838	14.96	New
Communist	Saichi Toguchi	19,799	8.27	N/A
Happiness Realization	Hirotoshi Inda	2,354	0.98	
Majority		198	0.09	
Registered electors		427,730		
Turnout			57.99	▼9.60
LDP gain from Democratic				

=== 2009 ===
2009
Party	Candidate	Votes	%	±%
Democratic	Atsushi Oshima (incumbent)	186,993	67.56	
Liberal Democratic	Kazuyuki Nakane (PR seat incumbent)	84,654	30.59	
Happiness Realization	Hirotoshi Inda	5,119	1.85	New
Majority		102,339	36.97	
Registered electors		423,131		
Turnout			67.59	▲1.03
Democratic hold				
