= Kazuyuki Nakane =

Japanese politician

- 中根 一幸
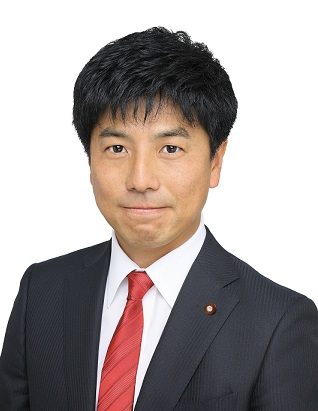
- Official portrait, 2011

Member of the House of Representatives; from Northern Kanto
- Incumbent
- Assumed office 8 February 2026
- Constituency: PR block
- In office 16 November 2012 – 9 October 2024
- Preceded by: Atsushi Oshima
- Succeeded by: Multi-member district
- Constituency: Saitama 6th (2012–2014); PR block (2014–2024)
- In office 11 September 2005 – 18 August 2009
- Constituency: PR block

Member of the Konosu City Council
- In office 1 May 1995 – 1999

Personal details
- Born: 11 July 1969 (age 57) Kōnosu, Saitama, Japan
- Party: Liberal Democratic
- Education: Nippon Sport Science University; Senshu University

Kazuyuki Nakane (中根 一幸, Nakane Kazuyuki; born 11 July 1969) is a former Japanese politician who served in the House of Representatives in the Diet (national legislature) as a member of the Liberal Democratic Party. A native of Kōnosu, Saitama he attended Nippon Sport Science University as an undergraduate and Senshu University as a graduate student. He was elected to the Diet for the first time in 2005 after unsuccessfully running for mayor of his hometown Kōnosu in 2001.
