= Honda Airport =

Honda Airport ホンダエアポート
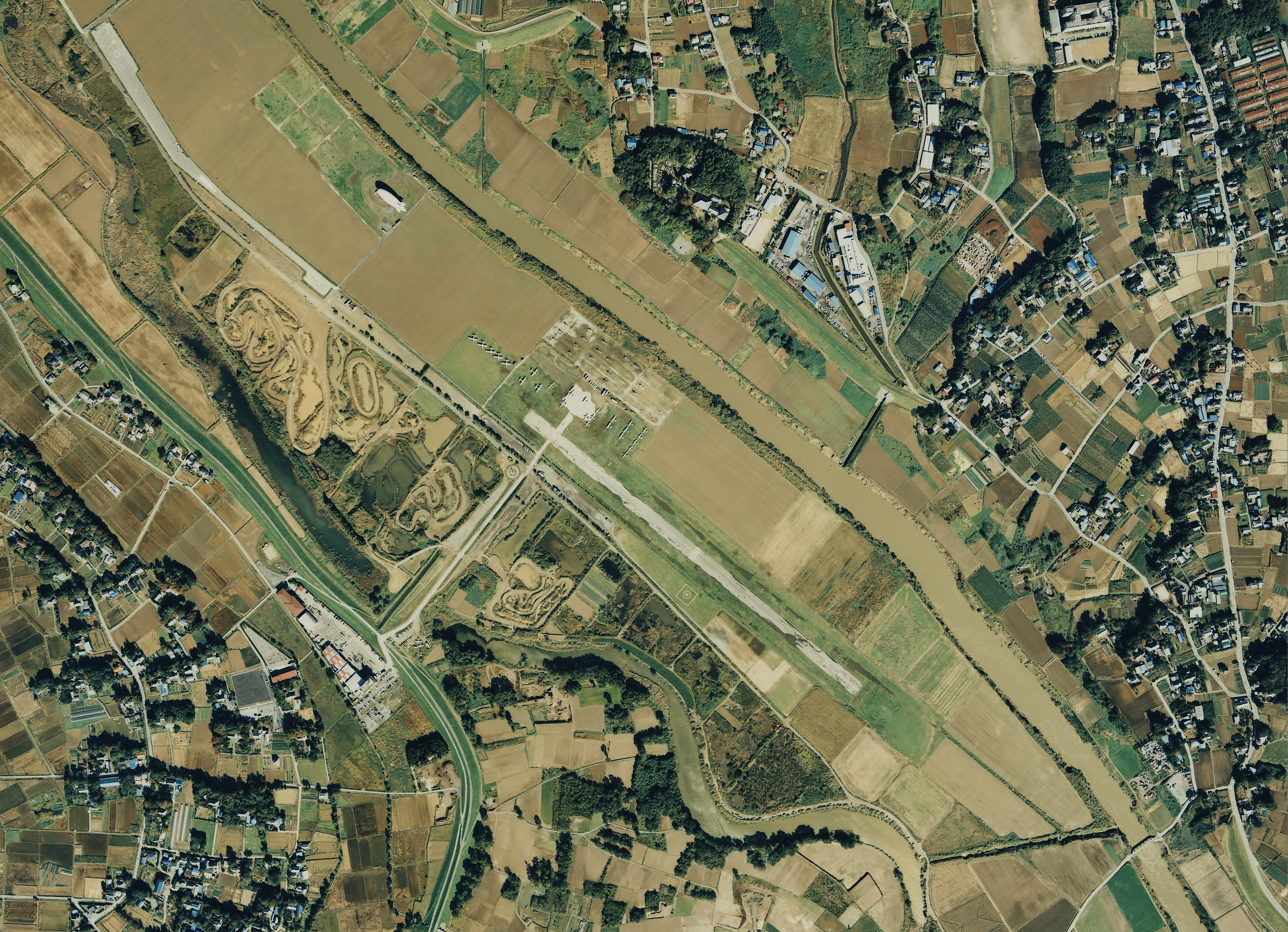
- IATA: none; ICAO: RJT1

Summary
- Airport type: Private
- Operator: Honda Airways
- Location: Okegawa, Saitama, Japan
- Elevation AMSL: 39 ft / 12 m
- Coordinates: 35°58′35″N 139°31′27″E
- Website: www.honda-air.com

Map
- Location in Japan Honda Airport (Japan)

Runways
Direction	Length		Surface
Direction	m	ft	Surface
14/32	720	2,362	Paved

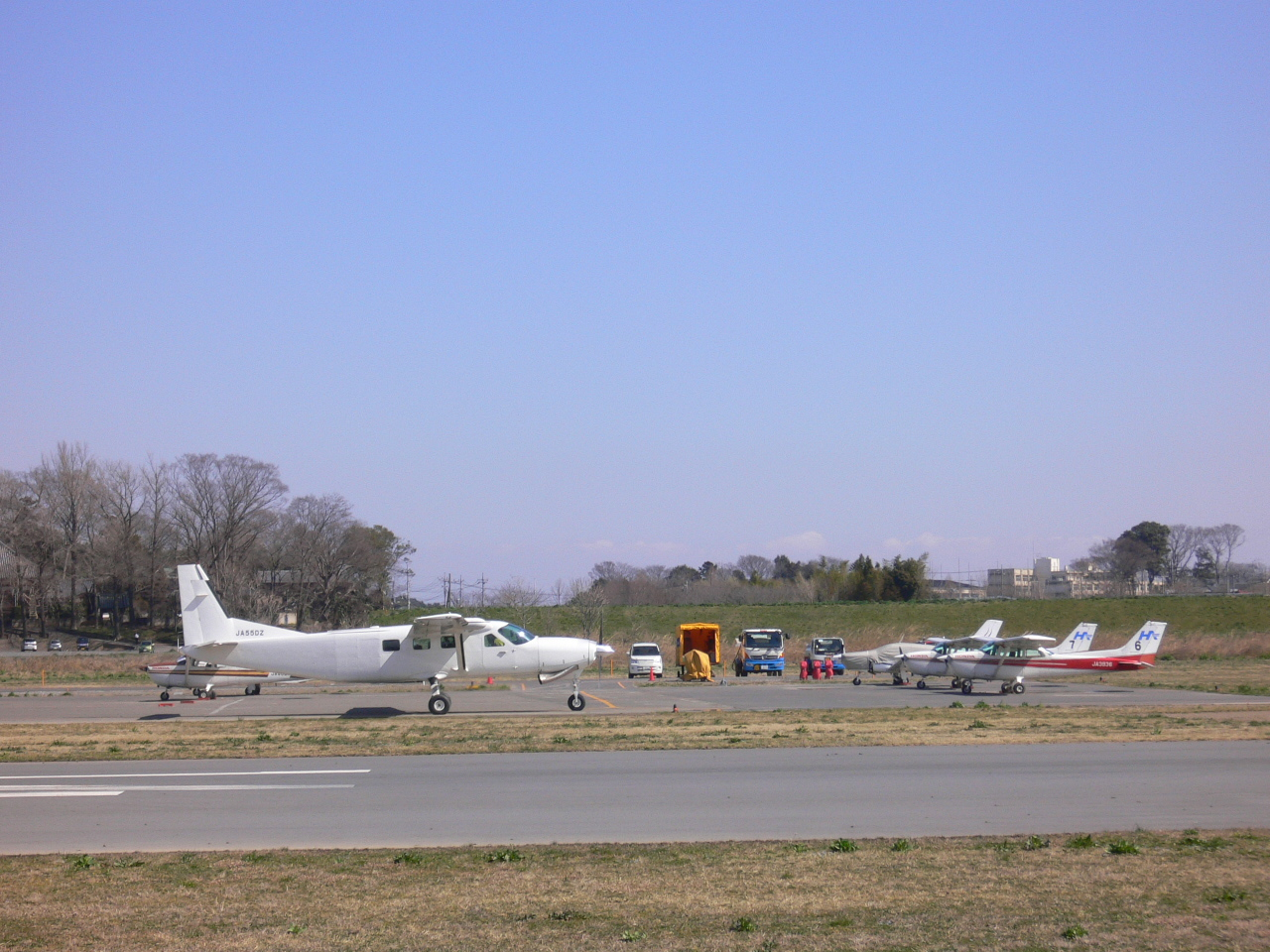
View of Honda Airport

Honda Airport (ホンダエアポート, Honda eapōto) is a private airfield in the town of Kawajima, Hiki District, and the city of Okegawa, both in Saitama Prefecture, Japan. Another name for it is Okegawa Airfield. The operator is Honda Airways, a subsidiary of Honda Motor Co. Ltd.

== Data ==
The location of the airfield is 35°58'21" north latitude, 139°31'42" east longitude. The elevation is 11.9 m (39 ft), has a single runway measuring 600 m × 25 m (1,969 ft × 82 ft) and an area of 59 ha (150 acres). It operates from 9:00 a.m. to 5:30 p.m. (or sunset).

Prior to World War II, the Imperial Japanese Army developed the site and operated it as Kawataya Airfield. It was established as Honda Airfield in 1964, and received a license for aircraft to operate there in 1967. Helicopter operations commenced in 1975, and in 2003, the Tochigi Prefecture disaster-prevention helicopter began operating there. Saitama Prefecture also operates at Honda.

Honda Airways operates sightseeing, aerial photography and surveying, advertising and publicity flights.

The airfield also serves as a shooting location for television dramas.
