= Ina, Saitama =

Ina 伊奈町
- Town
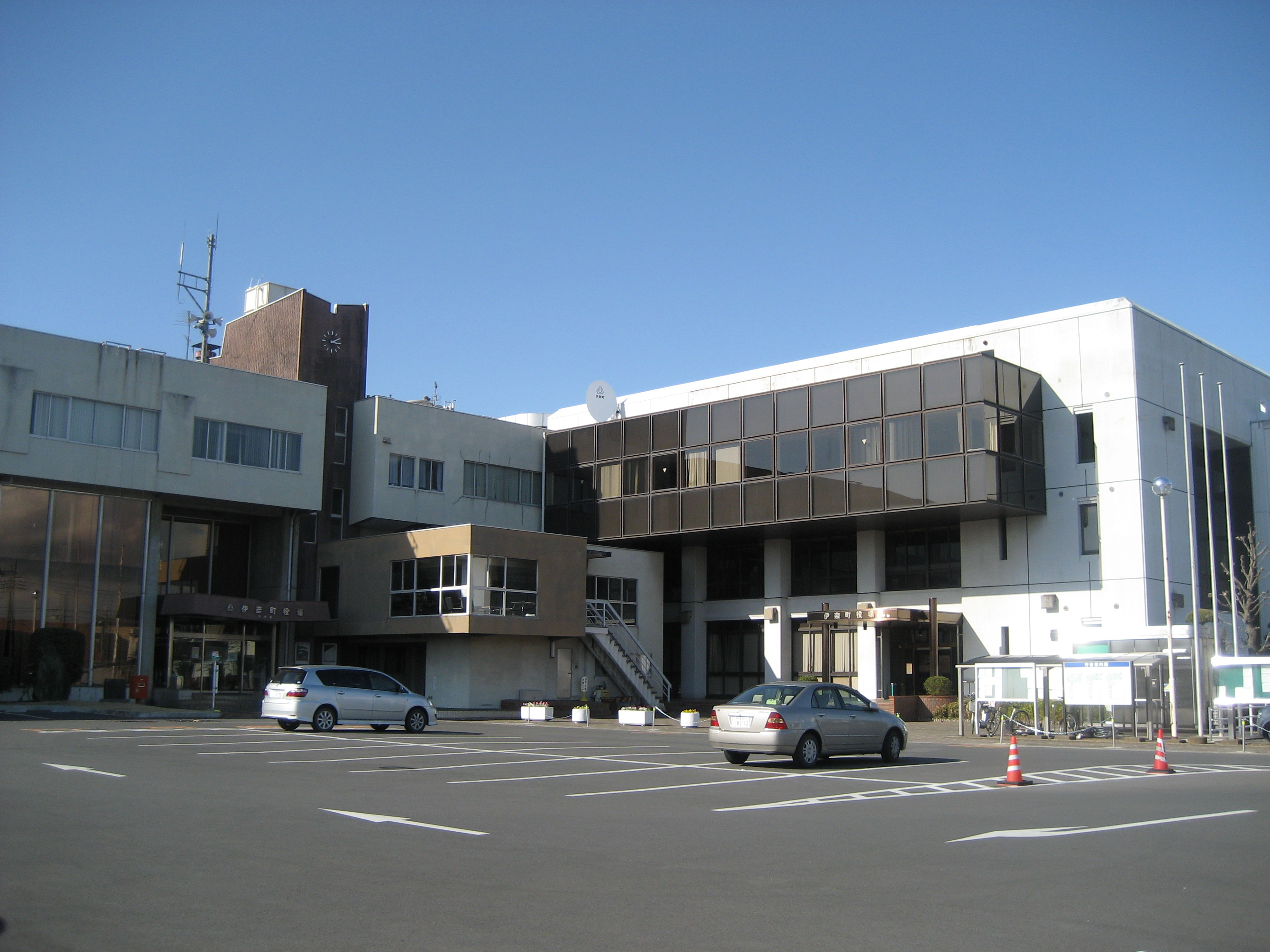
- Ina Town Hall

- Flag Seal

- Location of Ina in Saitama Prefecture

- Coordinates: 36°0′0.3″N 139°37′27″E
- Country: Japan
- Region: Kantō
- Prefecture: Saitama
- District: Kitaadachi

Area
  - Total: 14.79 km^{2} (5.71 sq mi)

Population (March 2021)
  - Total: 44,928
  - Density: 3,038/km^{2} (7,868/sq mi)
- Time zone: UTC+9 (Japan Standard Time)
- Tree: Osmanthus fragrans
- Flower: Rose
- Phone number: 048-721-2111
- Address: 9493 Komuro, Ina-machi, Kitaadachi-gun, Saitama-ken 362-8517
- Website: Official website

Ina (伊奈町, Ina-machi) is a town in Saitama Prefecture, Japan. As of 1 March 2021, the town had an estimated population of 44,928 in 18,907 households and a population density of 3000 persons per km^{2}. The total area of the town is 30.03 square kilometres (11.59 sq mi).

== Geography ==
Located in central-east Saitama Prefecture, Ina is in the flatlands of the Kantō plains.The Ayase River runs along the eastern border, and the Haraichi Numa River runs along the western border. About 60% of the town area is located on the Omiya plateau, and the rest is the alluvial plain. The highest point in the town area is 19 meters above sea level.

=== Surrounding municipalities ===
Saitama Prefecture

- Ageo
- Hasuda
- Okegawa

== Demographics ==
Per Japanese census data, the population of Ina has increased rapidly since the 1970s.

Historical population
Year	Pop.	±%
1920	5,726	—
1930	5,881	+2.7%
1940	6,091	+3.6%
1950	7,327	+20.3%
1960	6,755	−7.8%
1970	10,112	+49.7%
1980	21,005	+107.7%
1990	27,100	+29.0%
2000	32,216	+18.9%
2010	42,494	+31.9%
2020	44,841	+5.5%

== History ==
Paleolithic-era artefacts have been uncovered within the boundary of Ina, with one being the Mukaihara Site, located in the northeastern part of the town. A group of stone tools dating back approximately 25,000 years was discovered, forming part of paleolithic-era finds of the Omiya Plateau. Other paleolithic sites are Inashi Yashiki-ato and Tozakimae Sites, Kuboyama Site, Oyama Site, and Hara Site, where projectile-points, knife-shaped, and pyramid-shaped stone-tools made by pre-historic homo sapiens were found.

Jomon-era finds have been discovered along the edges of the plateaus carved out by the Ayase and Haraichinuma Rivers. At various sites, Jomon-era pottery, dwellings, hearth pits, shell middens, and enclosures, were found. Many villages dating to the middle Jomon period have been uncovered at Hara, Kita, Oyama, Shiku, and Komuro Tenjinmae. However, it is rare to uncover substantial habitations dating to the late Jomon period. One such late Jomon era site is the Honjo Site, which features a circular earthwork enclosure. Pottery sherds dating to the final Jomon stage have been discovered at Inashi Yashiki-ato, Oyama, and Mukaihara.

There is a gap in the archeological record between the final Jomon period and the Kofun era, with no Yayoi era sites being uncovered in the vicinity. Early Kofun period finds have been unearthed at the Komuro Tenjinmae and Mukaihara sites.

During the early Edo period, Ina town was home to the short-lived (1590–1619) Komuro Domain founded by Ina Tadatsugu, who oversaw flood-control works on the Ayase River that reduced flood risks and improved agricultural productivity in the area. It was afterward ruled as hatamoto territory under the direct control of the Tokugawa shogunate.

The villages of Komuro and Kobari were created in Kitaadachi District, Saitama with the establishment of the modern municipalities system on April 1, 1889. They were merged on July 15, 1943, to form the village of Ina. Ina was elevated to town status on November 1, 1970.

== Government ==
Ina has a mayor-council form of government with a directly elected mayor and a unicameral town council of 16 members. Ina, together with the city of Ageo, contributes one member to the Saitama Prefectural Assembly. In terms of national politics, the town is part of Saitama 6th district of the lower house of the Diet of Japan.

== Economy ==
The economy of Ina is primarily agricultural.

== Education ==
- Nihon Pharmaceutical University
- Ina has four public elementary schools and three public middle schools operated by the town government, and one combined public middle/high schools operated by the Saitama Prefectural Board of Education. The town also has one private combined middle/high school and one private high school.

== Transportation ==
=== Railway ===
Saitama New Urban Transit - New Shuttle

- Maruyama - Shiku - Ina-Chūō - Hanuki - Uchijuku

=== Highway ===
Ina is not served by any expressways or public highways

== Local attractions ==
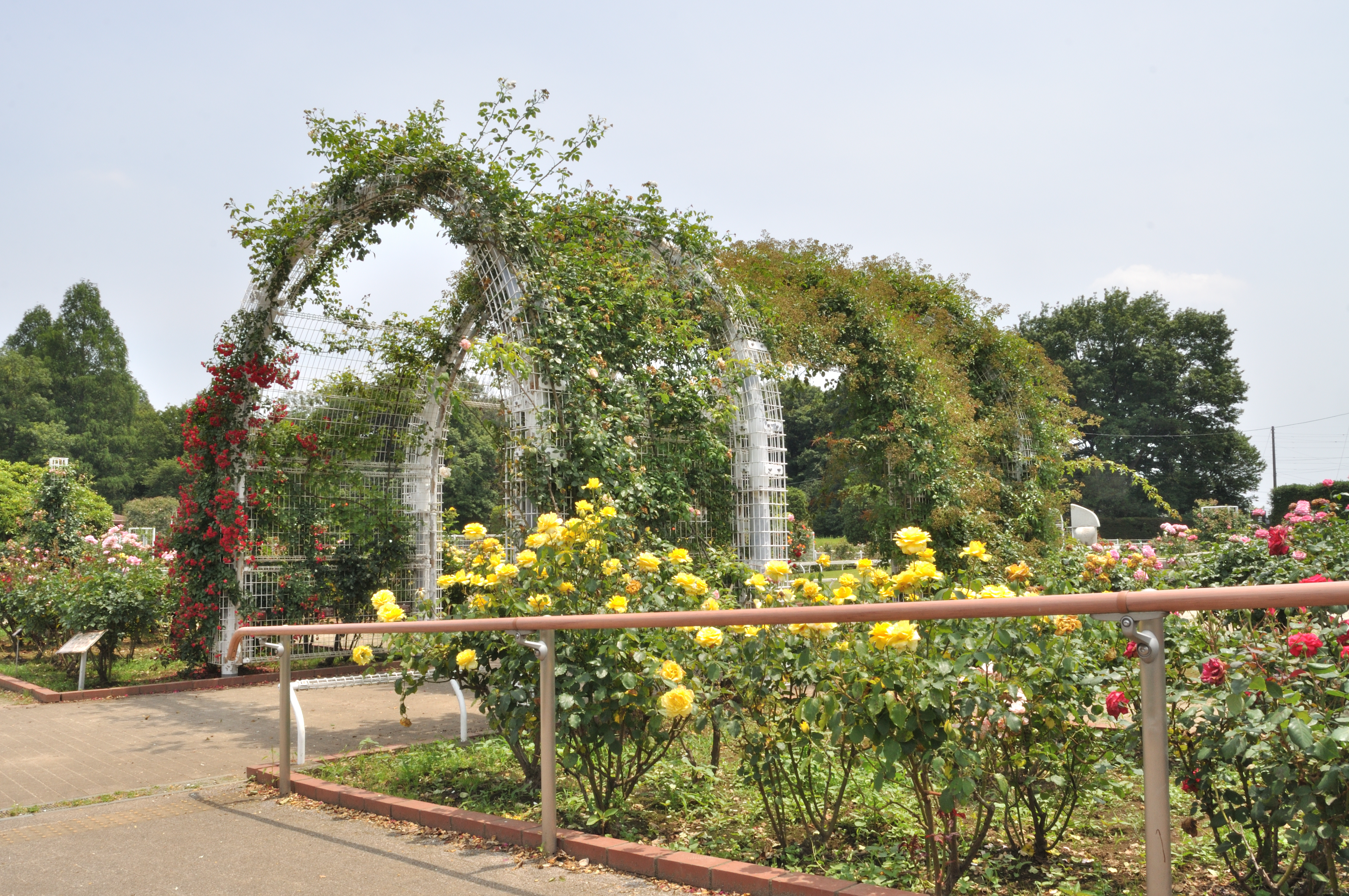
- Ina Town Memorial Park
  Saitama Cancer Center
- Saitama Prefectural Mental Health Center
