= Kita-Adachi District =

District in Saitama prefecture, Japan

Coordinates: 35.972°N 139.636°E

Kitaadachi (北足立郡, Kita-Adachi-gun) is a district located in Saitama Prefecture, Japan.

As of October 1, 2005, the district had an estimated population of 36,535 and a population density of 2,470.25 persons per km^{2}. Its total area is 14.80 km^{2} (These numbers are excluding those of Fukiage, which merged with a city outside the district on October 1, 2005).

== Towns and villages ==
- Ina

== Merger ==
On October 1, 2005, the town of Fukiage merged into the city of Kōnosu.
