= Akie Nakata =

Japanese stone artist

- Born: 1974 (age 51–52); Japan
- Occupation: Stone artist

Akie Nakata (born 1974) is a Japanese stone artist. She is known for her paintings of animals on rocks, which she has stated are guided by the shape of the rock. She has gone viral for her work.

== Biography ==
She was born in 1974. She has stated that from a young age, she loved animals, art, and rocks. She attended university to study art education. She began working as a stone artist in 2011, after encountering a stone that she stated looked like a rabbit, taking it home, and painting it into a rabbit. She is a self-taught artist.

Her best-known work is her paintings of animals on stones utilizing acrylic gouache.

She has stated that she collects the stones she utilizes in her work from riverbanks in Saitama Prefecture, and claims to never alter the shape or surface of the rocks. She has said she paints "the animal that she feels is inside the stone". She has also stated that the correct stone finds her, and described her work as a "collaboration between two fragments on earth". She sometimes talks to the stones. She paints the body of the animal first, before ending with the eyes.

According to Forbes, her works frequently sell in less than ten minutes on Facebook, for between 300 and 1500 dollars. She also sells her work through the Seizan Gallery and a department store, both in Tokyo. She had a solo exhibition at Seizan Gallery in 2019.

She collects Zuni fetishes. All About Japan has speculated that this is an inspiration behind her work.
