= Fukiage, Saitama =

Town in Japan

Coordinates: 36.100°N 139.450°E

Fukiage (吹上町, Fukiage-machi) was a town located in Kitaadachi District, Saitama Prefecture, Japan.

As of 2003, the town had an estimated population of 28,124 and a density of 1,869.95 persons per km^{2}. The total area was 15.04 km^{2}.

On October 1, 2005, Fukiage, along with the town of Kawasato (from Kitasaitama District), was merged in the expanded city of Kōnosu.
