= Okegawa =

Okegawa 桶川市
- City
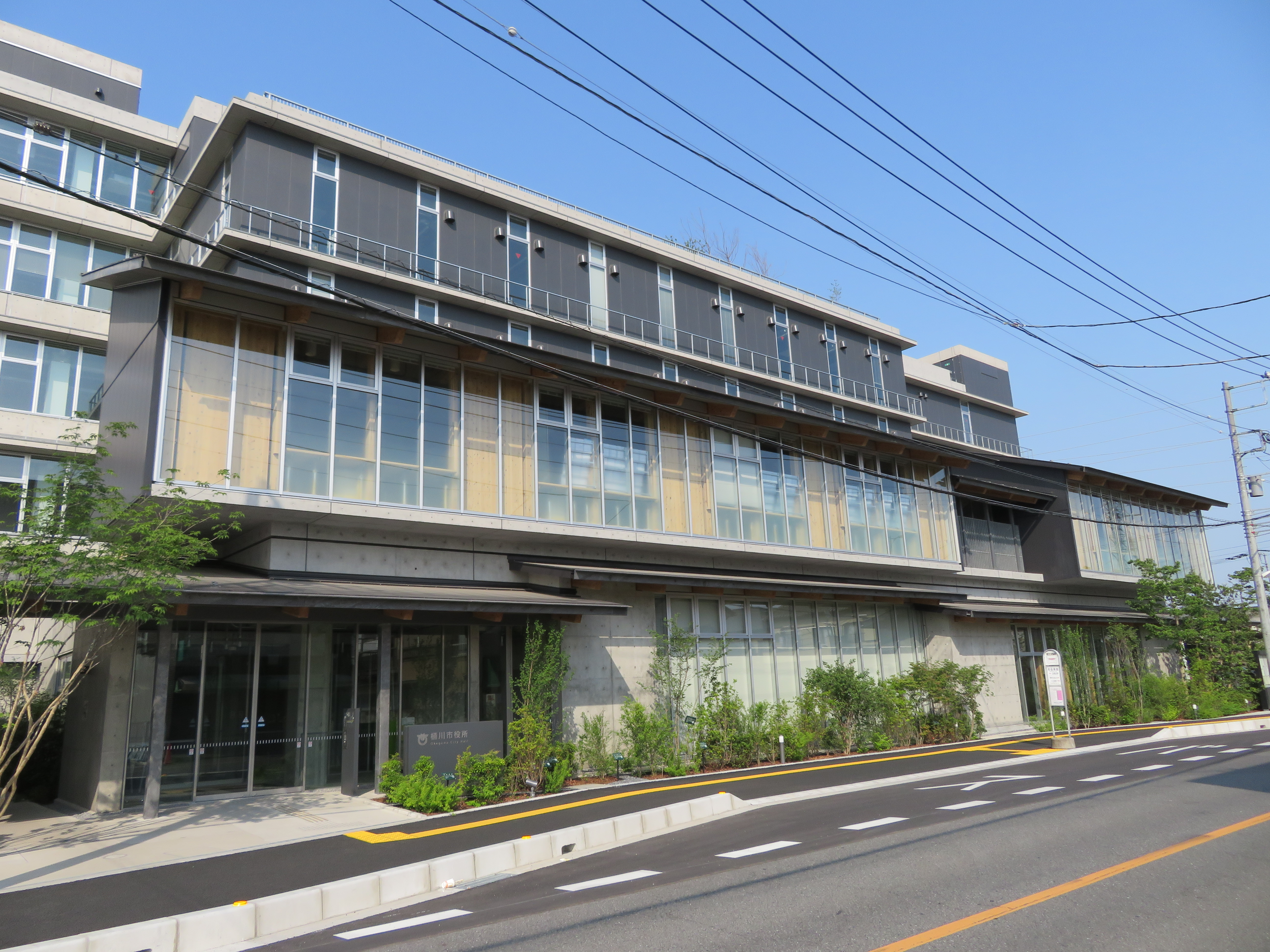
- Okegawa city hall

- Flag Emblem

- Location of Okegawa in Saitama Prefecture

- Location within Japan
- Coordinates: 36°0′20.6″N 139°32′33.7″E
- Country: Japan
- Region: Kantō
- Prefecture: Saitama

Area
  - Total: 25.35 km^{2} (9.79 sq mi)

Population (December 2020)
  - Total: 75,218
  - Density: 2,967/km^{2} (7,685/sq mi)
- Time zone: UTC+9 (Japan Standard Time)
- Tree: Zelkova serrata
- Flower: Azalea
- Website: Official website

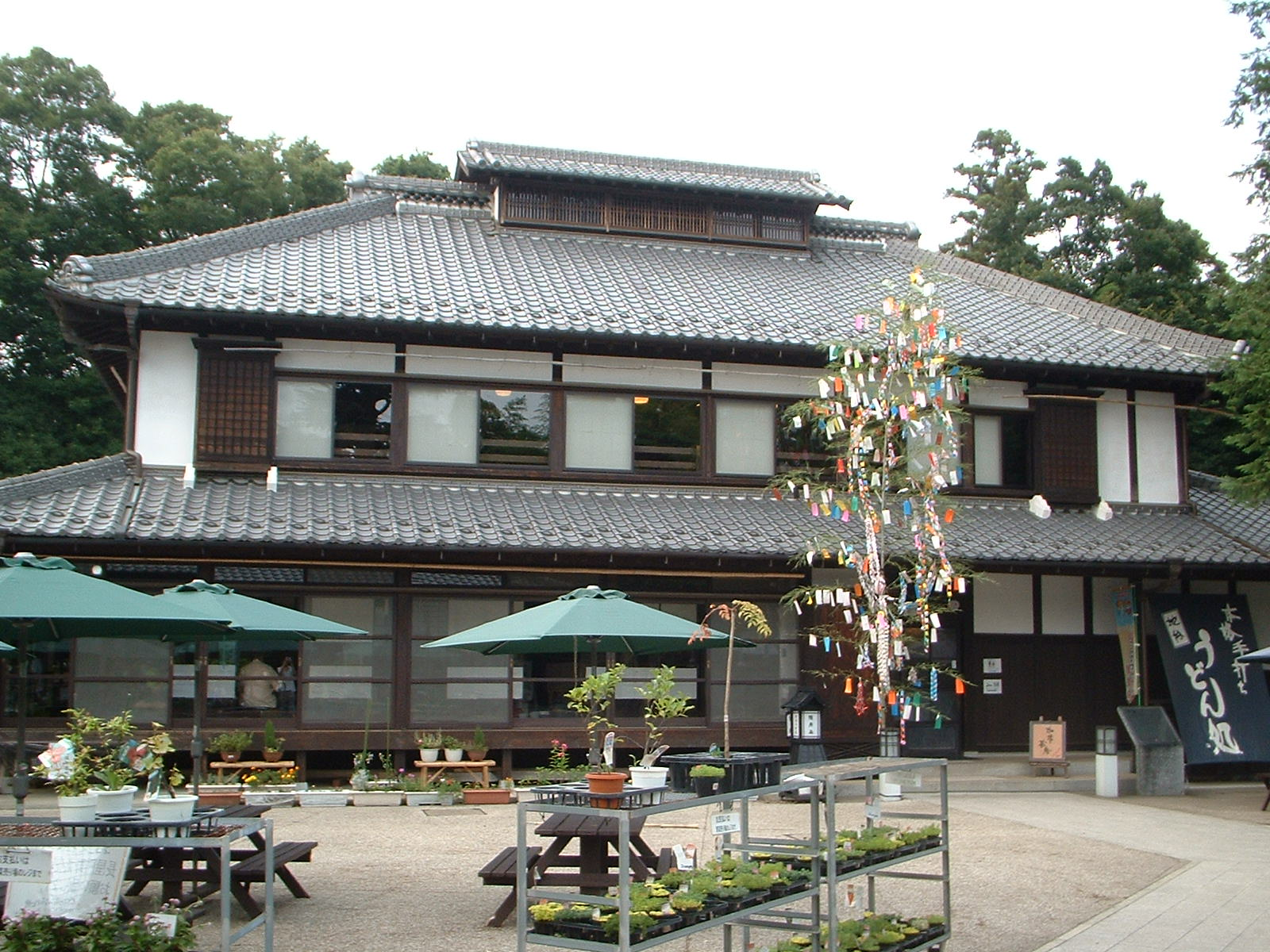
Benibana Furusatokan Museum

Okegawa (桶川市, Okegawa-shi; Japanese pronunciation: [ò̞.ké̞.ɡä́.β̞ä́(.ɕì), -ŋä́-]) is a city located in Saitama Prefecture, Japan. As of 1 December 2020, the city had an estimated population of 75,218 in 33,119 households and a population density of 3000 persons per km^{2}. The total area of the city is 25.35 square kilometres (9.79 sq mi).

== Geography ==
Okegawa is located in east-central Saitama Prefecture, most of the city area is on the Omiya plateau. The highest point is 25 meters above sea level in the northwest. The Arakawa River flows through the city. The Motoara River flows on the east side of the city, on the border with Kuki.

=== Surrounding municipalities ===
Saitama Prefecture

- Ageo
- Hasuda
- Ina
- Kawajima
- Kitamoto
- Kōnosu
- Kuki

=== Climate ===
Okegawa has a humid subtropical climate (Köppen Cfa) characterized by warm summers and cool winters with light to no snowfall. The average annual temperature in Okegawa is 14.7 °C. The average annual rainfall is 1367 mm with September as the wettest month. The temperatures are highest on average in August, at around 26.7 °C, and lowest in January, at around 3.7 °C.

== Demographics ==
Per Japanese census data, the population of Okegawa has recently plateaued after a long period of growth.

Historical population
Year	Pop.	±%
1920	11,048	—
1930	11,732	+6.2%
1940	12,417	+5.8%
1950	19,495	+57.0%
1960	21,309	+9.3%
1970	38,717	+81.7%
1980	55,747	+44.0%
1990	69,029	+23.8%
2000	73,967	+7.2%
2010	74,711	+1.0%
2020	74,748	+0.0%

== History ==
During the Edo period, Okegawa-shuku was the sixth of the sixty-nine stations of the Nakasendō, with the surrounding area noted for its production of safflower.

The town of Okegawa was established within Iruma District with the establishment of the modern municipalities system on April 1, 1889. On January 1, 1955, Okegawa annexed the neighboring village of Kano, followed by the village of Kawataya on March 10, 1955. Okegawa was elevated to city status on November 3, 1970.

== Government ==
Okegawa has a mayor-council form of government with a directly elected mayor and a unicameral city council of 19 members. Okegawa contributes one member to the Saitama Prefectural Assembly. In terms of national politics, the city is part of Saitama 6th district of the lower house of the Diet of Japan.

== Economy ==
Okegawa was traditionally known as a center for safflower production. The city now has a mixed economy, with a significant portion of its population commuting to Tokyo or Saitama city for work.

== Education ==
- Okegawa has seven public elementary schools and four public middle schools operated by the city government, and two public high schools operated by the Saitama Prefectural Board of Education.

== Transportation ==
=== Railway ===
JR East – Takasaki Line

- Okegawa

=== Highway ===
- Ken-Ō Expressway – Okegawa-Kita Interchange, Okegawa-Kano Interchange
- National Route 17

== Local attractions ==
- Honda Airport
- Kawataya Kofun cluster
- Okegawa Gion Festival
- Okegawa-shuku

== Noted people from Okegawa ==
- Masahiro Motoki, actor
- Michiyo Tsujimura, agricultural chemist
