= Kitamoto =

Kitamoto 北本市
- City
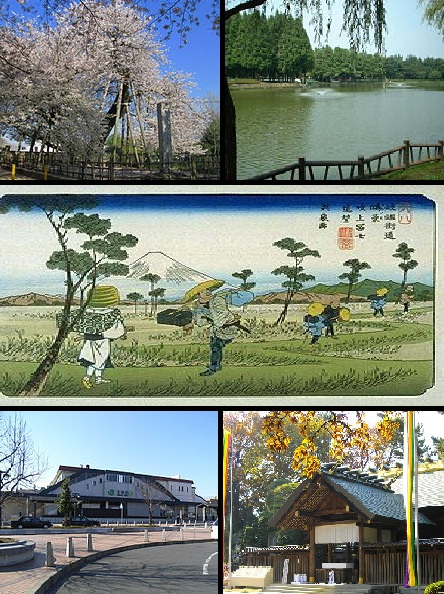
- Top left: Ishidokaba Cherry blossom in Toko Temple, Top right: A fountain in Kitamoto General Park, Center: Konosu Traditional Inn, Nakasen Road in Edo period, Bottom left: Kitamoto Station, Bottom right: Tenjinchigi Shrine

- Flag Seal

- Location of Kitamoto in Saitama Prefecture

- Location within Japan
- Coordinates: 36°1′36.8″N 139°31′48.7″E
- Country: Japan
- Region: Kantō
- Prefecture: Saitama

Area
  - Total: 19.82 km^{2} (7.65 sq mi)

Population (January 2021)
  - Total: 66,022
  - Density: 3,331/km^{2} (8,627/sq mi)
- Time zone: UTC+9 (Japan Standard Time)
  - Tree: Sakura
  - Flower: Chrysanthemum
- Phone number: 048-591-1111
- Address: 1–111 Honmachi, Kitamoto-shi, Saitama-ken 364-8633
- Website: Official website

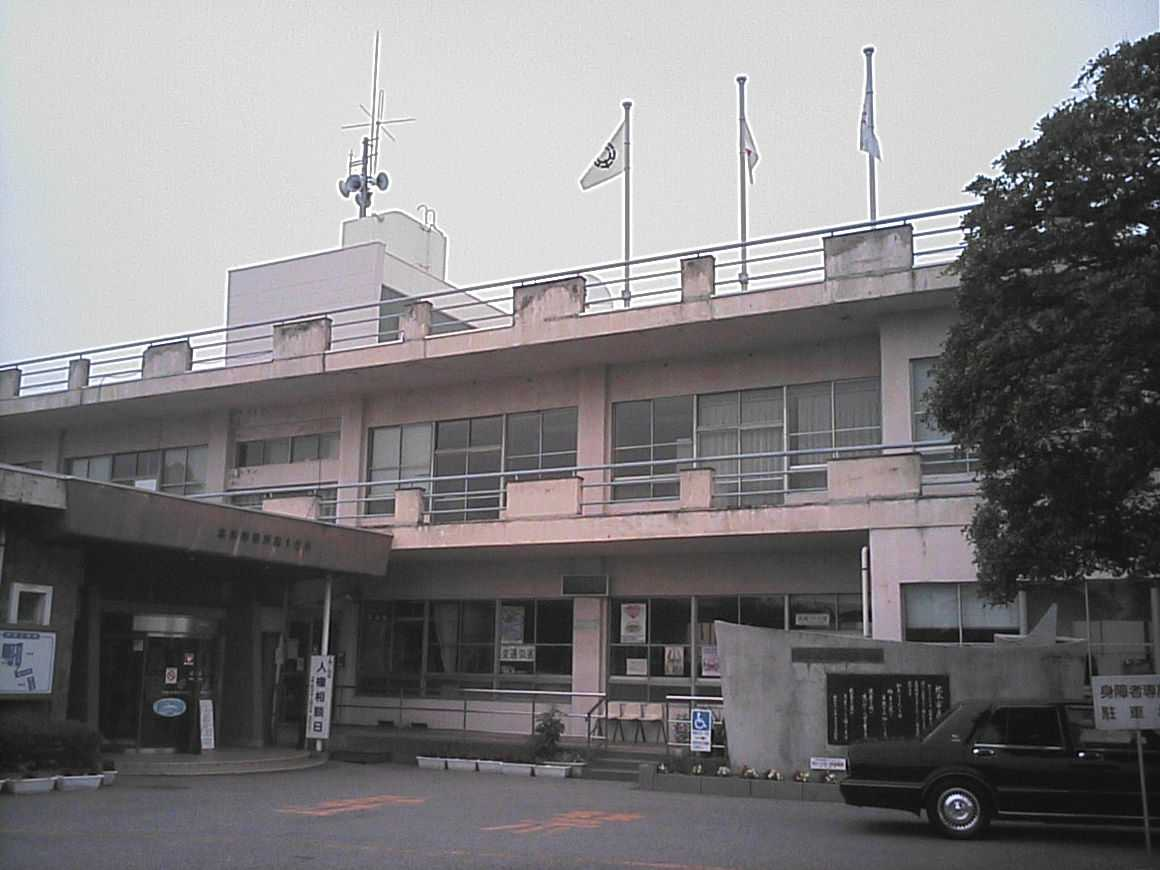
Kitamoto City Hall

Kitamoto (北本市, Kitamoto-shi) is a city in Saitama Prefecture, Japan. As of 1 January 2021, the city had an estimated population of 66,022 and a population density of 3300 persons per km^{2}. The total area of the city is 19.82 square kilometres (7.65 sq mi).

== Geography ==
In east-central Saitama Prefecture, Kitamoto is on the central reaches of the Arakawa River, and is within commuting distance of downtown Tokyo.

=== Surrounding municipalities ===
Saitama Prefecture

- Kawajima
- Kōnosu
- Okegawa
- Yoshimi

=== Climate ===
Kitamoto has a humid subtropical climate (Köppen Cfa) characterized by warm summers and cool winters with light to no snowfall. The average annual temperature in Kitamoto is 14.6 °C. The average annual rainfall is 1353 mm with September as the wettest month. The temperatures are highest on average in August, at around 26.6 °C, and lowest in January, at around 3.6 °C.

== Demographics ==
Per Japanese census data, the population of Kitamoto has recently plateaued after a long period of growth.

Historical population
Year	Pop.	±%
1920	7,633	—
1930	8,054	+5.5%
1940	8,366	+3.9%
1950	13,457	+60.9%
1960	15,483	+15.1%
1970	31,699	+104.7%
1980	50,888	+60.5%
1990	63,929	+25.6%
2000	69,524	+8.8%
2010	68,888	−0.9%
2020	65,201	−5.4%

== History ==
Kōnosu-shuku was one of the post stations on the Nakasendō highway until 1602, when it was relocated north; the original location was renamed Motojuku, and later, Kitamotojuku, which is the origin of the name of the modern city. With the establishment of the modern municipalities system on April 1, 1889, Kitamotojuku was merged with several neighboring hamlets to form the village of Ishito within Kitaadachi District, Saitama. On February 11, 1943, Ishito was merged with neighboring Nakamaru to form Kitamotojuku Village. On November 3, 1959, the village was elevated to town status, becoming Kitamoto Town. Kitamoto attained city status on November 3, 1971.

== Government ==
Kitamoto has a mayor-council form of government with a directly elected mayor and a unicameral city council of 20 members. Kitamoto contributes one member to the Saitama Prefectural Assembly. In terms of national politics, the city is part of Saitama 6th district of the lower house of the Diet of Japan.

== Economy ==
Due to this location, Kitamoto is primarily a bedroom community with a high percentage of its population commuting to either Saitama City or the Tokyo metropolis for work.

== Education ==
Kitamoto has eight public elementary schools and four public middle schools operated by the city government, and one public high school operated by the Saitama Prefectural Board of Education.

== Transportation ==
=== Railway ===
JR East – Takasaki Line

- Kitamoto

=== Highway ===
- National Route 17

== Noted people from Kitamoto ==
- Atsushi Oshima, politician
