= Ageo =

Ageo 上尾市
- City
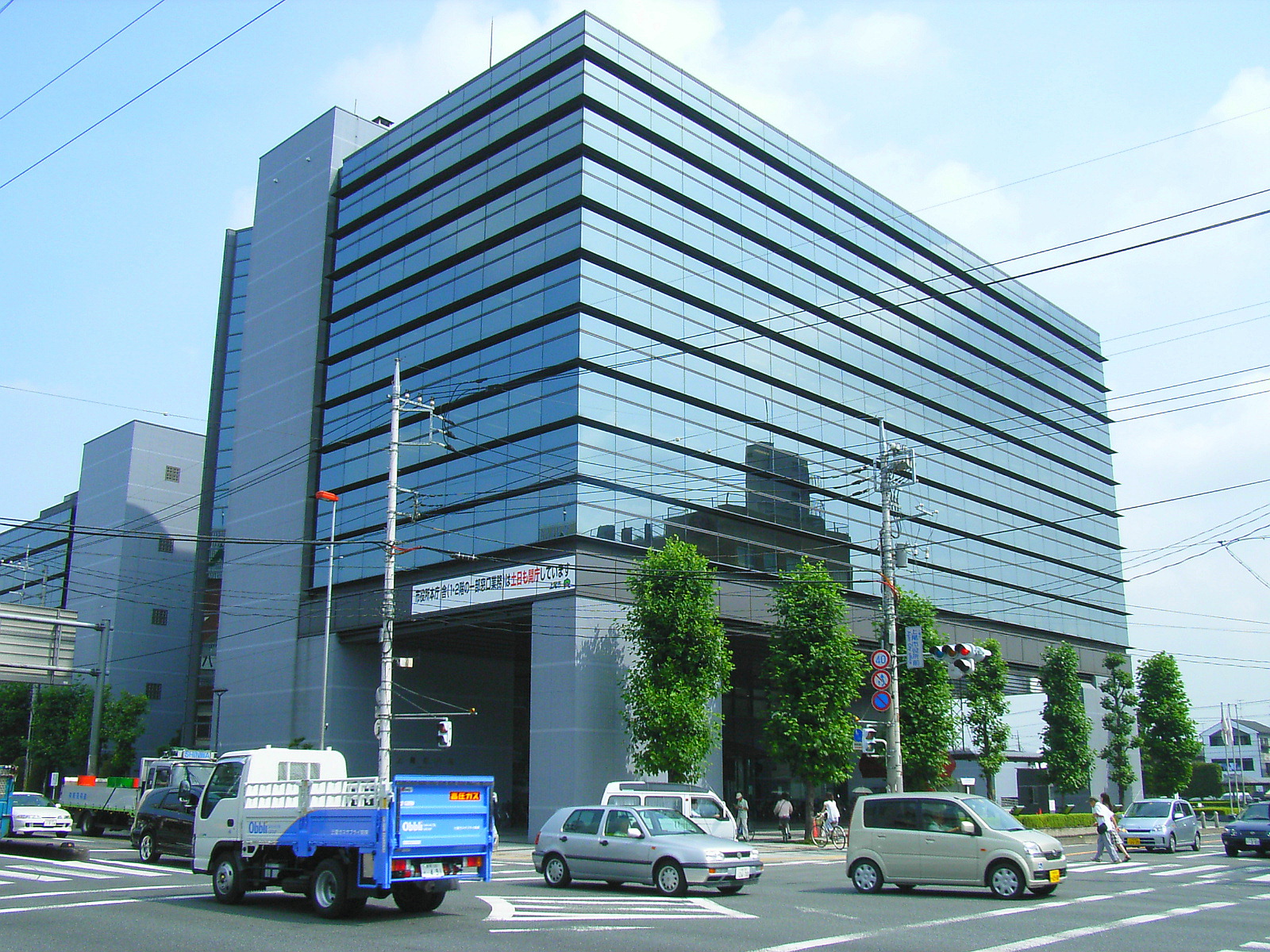
- Ageo City Hall

- Flag Seal

- Location of Ageo in Saitama Prefecture

- Location within Japan
- Coordinates: 35°58′38.6″N 139°35′35.5″E
- Country: Japan
- Region: Kantō
- Prefecture: Saitama

Area
  - Total: 45.51 km^{2} (17.57 sq mi)

Population (February 1, 2024)
  - Total: 230,041
  - Density: 5,055/km^{2} (13,090/sq mi)
- Time zone: UTC+9 (Japan Standard Time)
- Tree: Osmanthus
- Flower: Azalea
- Phone number: 048-775-5111
- Address: 3-1-1 Honchō, Ageo-shi, Saitama-ken 362-8501
- Website: Official website

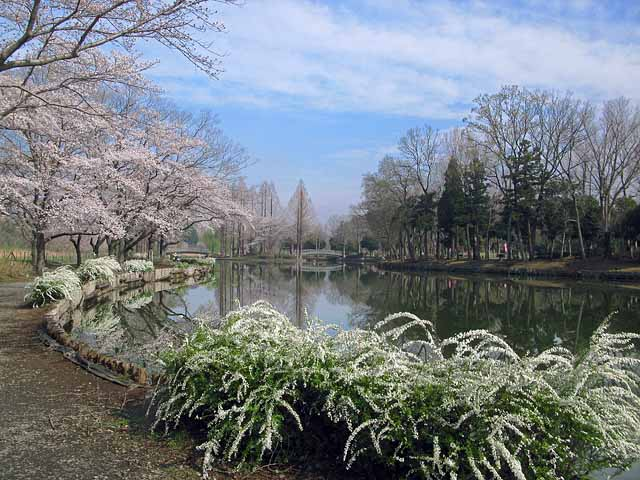
Ageo Maruyama Park

Ageo (上尾市, Ageo-shi; Japanese pronunciation: [ä̀.ɡé̞.ó̞(.ɕì), -ŋé̞-]) is a city located in Saitama Prefecture, Japan. As of February 1, 2024, the city had an estimated population of 230,041 in 107,555 households and a population density of 5100 persons per km^{2}. The total area of the city is 45.51 square kilometres (17.57 sq mi).

== Geography ==
Ageo is located in the Kanto Plain, slightly east of the center of Saitama Prefecture, and there are no mountains in the city. The city is roughly 10.48 km east–west and 9.32 km north–south. It partially touches the left bank of the Arakawa River.The Kamo River and Shiba River flow through the city. The Ayase River forms the boundary to the east and the Egara, a tributary of the Arakawa River forms the northwest boundary.

=== Surrounding municipalities ===
- Saitama Prefecture
  - Hasuda
  - Ina
  - Kawagoe
  - Kawajima
  - Okegawa
  - Saitama (Kita-ku, Minuma-ku, Nishi-ku)

=== Climate ===
Ageo has a humid subtropical climate (Köppen Cfa) characterized by warm summers and cool winters with light to no snowfall. The average annual temperature in Ageo is 14.7 °C. The average annual rainfall is 1388 mm with September as the wettest month. The temperatures are highest on average in August, at around 26.7 °C, and lowest in January, at around 3.9 °C.

== Demographics ==
Per Japanese census data, the population of Ageo expanded rapidly in the late 20th century and has grown at a slower pace in the 21st.

Historical population
Year	Pop.	±%
1920	19,912	—
1930	20,578	+3.3%
1940	23,551	+14.4%
1950	32,673	+38.7%
1960	38,889	+19.0%
1970	110,792	+184.9%
1980	166,243	+50.0%
1990	194,947	+17.3%
2000	212,947	+9.2%
2010	223,926	+5.2%
2020	226,940	+1.3%

== History ==
Ageo-shuku, a post town on the Nakasendō highway flourished during the Edo period. Ageo's rail station opened in 1883. In 1889, Ageo-juku merged with the hamlets of Ageoshimo, Kashiwaza, Kasugayatsu and Yatsu to form the town of Ageo with the establishment of the modern municipalities system on April 1, 1889. The two towns of Hirakata and Haraichi and the three villages of Kamihira, Ōishi and Ōya merged with the town of Ageo on January 1, 1955, which was elevated city status on July 15, 1958. In the 1960s, four large-scale public housing complexes were established, forming new town developments which greatly expanded the city's population. A proposal to merge with the neighboring city of Saitama was rejected by referendum in 2001.

== Government ==
Ageo has a mayor-council form of government with a directly elected mayor and a unicameral city council of 30 members. Ageo, together with the town of Ina, contributes three members to the Saitama Prefectural Assembly. In terms of national politics, the city is part of Saitama 6th district of the lower house of the Diet of Japan.

== Economy ==
Ageo was a noted agricultural area well into the 20th century, and various vegetables were cultivated. Agricultural land in the city area is declining, but in addition to pears, grapes and kiwis, various items such as tomatoes, cucumbers and spinach are produced. In the second half of the 20th century, numerous metallurgical and automobile factories were constructed, and UD Trucks and Bridgestone Cycle remain major employers. Due to its geographic location, Ageo is increasingly becoming a bedroom community for Saitama City and Tokyo.

== Education ==
- Seigakuin University
- Ageo has 22 public elementary schools and 11 public middle schools operated by the city government, and four public high schools operated by the Saitama Prefectural Board of Education. In addition, there is one private high school. The prefecture also operates two special education schools for the handicapped.

== Transportation ==
=== Railway ===
JR East – Takasaki Line

- Ageo - Kita-Ageo

Saitama New Urban Transit - New Shuttle

- Haraichi - Shōnan

=== Highway ===
- National Route 16
- National Route 17

== Sports ==
- Ageo Medics, a V.Premier League women's volleyball team
- Bridgestone–Anchor, cycling team

== Sister cities ==
- Hangzhou, Zhejiang, China, friendship city since March 26, 2004
- Lockyer Valley Region, Queensland, Australia
- Motomiya, Fukushima, Japan, friendship city since July 31, 2013

== Notable people from Ageo ==
- Mayuko Arisue, fashion model and actress
- Mai Ichii, professional wrestler, kick-boxer
- Rica Imai, fashion model and actress
- Takehiko Orimo, basketball player
