= Atsushi Oshima =

Japanese politician

- 大島 敦
- Official portrait, 2009

Acting Leader of the Kibō no Tō
- In office 14 November 2017 – 7 May 2018
- Leader: Yuichiro Tamaki
- Preceded by: Position established
- Succeeded by: Position abolished

Secretary-General of the Democratic Party
- In office September 2017 – October 2017
- Preceded by: Yoshihiko Noda
- Succeeded by: Teruhiko Mashiko

Member of the House of Representatives; from Northern Kanto
- Incumbent
- Assumed office 25 June 2000
- Preceded by: Kaneshige Wakamatsu
- Constituency: Saitama 6th (2000–2012); PR block (2012–2014); Saitama 6th (2014–2026); PR block (2026–present)

Personal details
- Born: 21 December 1956 (age 69) Kitamoto, Saitama, Japan
- Party: Independent
- Other political affiliations: DPJ (2000–2016); DP (2016–2017); KnT (2017–2018); DPFP (2018–2020); CDP (2020–2026); CRA (2026)
- Education: Waseda University
- Website: https://oshimaatsushi.com/

Atsushi Oshima (大島 敦, Ōshima Atsushi; born 21 December 1956) is a Japanese politician in the House of Representatives in the Diet (national legislature). A native of Kitamoto, Saitama and graduate of Waseda University, he was elected for the first time in 2000.
