= Kōnosu =

Kōnosu 鴻巣市
- City
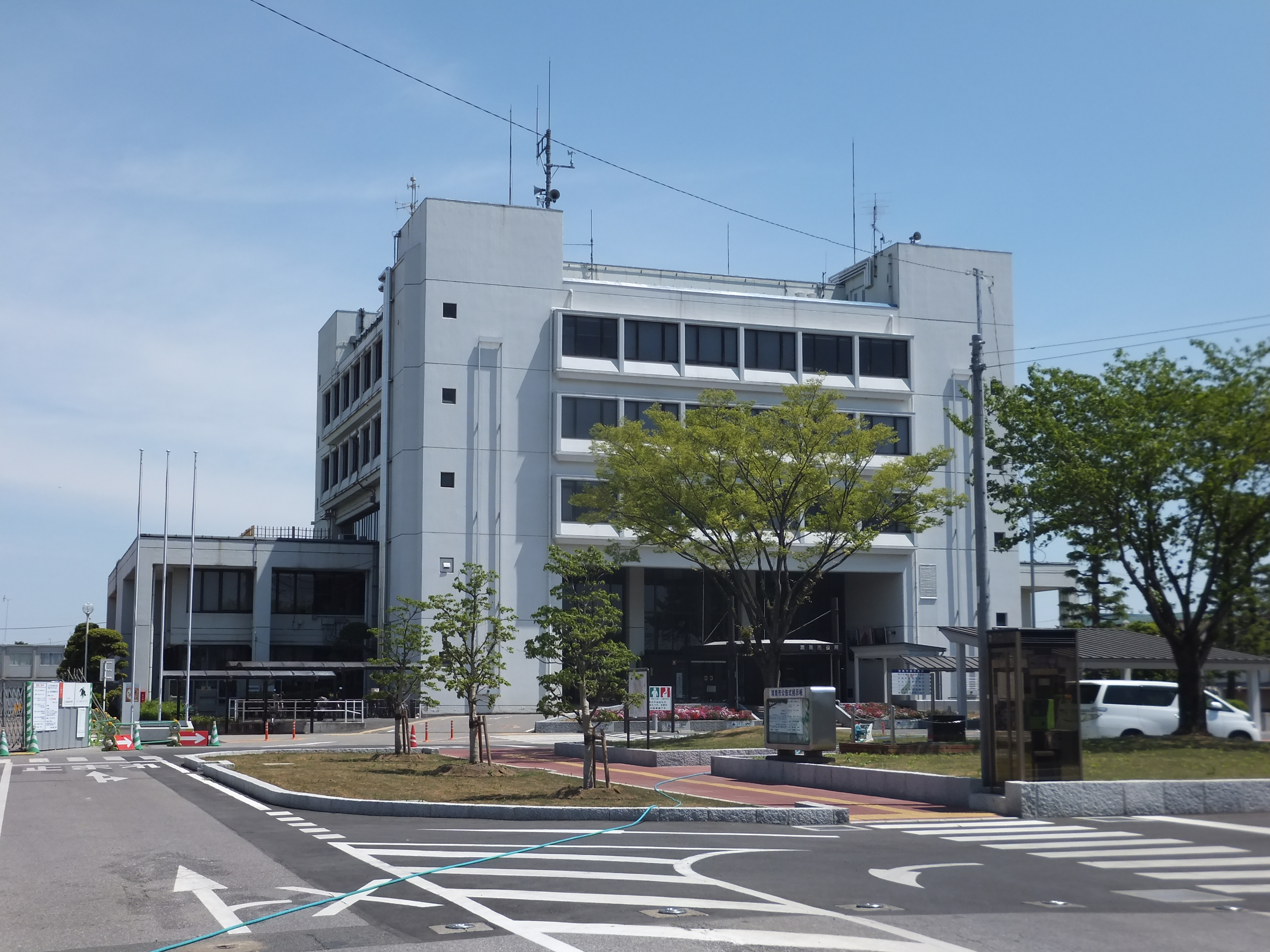
- Kōnosu City Hall

- Flag Emblem

- Location of Kōnosu in Saitama Prefecture

- Location within Japan
- Coordinates: 36°03′57.2″N 139°31′19.9″E
- Country: Japan
- Region: Kantō
- Prefecture: Saitama

Area
  - Total: 67.44 km^{2} (26.04 sq mi)

Population (January 2021)
  - Total: 117,995
  - Density: 1,750/km^{2} (4,532/sq mi)
- Time zone: UTC+9 (Japan Standard Time)
  - Tree: Zelkova serrata
  - Flower: Pansy
- Phone number: 048-541-1321
- Address: 1-1-1 Chuo, Kōnosu-shi, Saitama-ken 365-8601
- Website: Official website

Kōnosu (鴻巣市, Kōnosu-shi) is a city located in Saitama Prefecture, Japan. As of 1 January 2021, the city had an estimated population of 117,995 in 50,801 households and a population density of 1700 persons per km^{2}. The total area of the city is 67.44 square kilometres (26.04 square miles).

== Geography ==
Located in east-central Saitama Prefecture, Kōnosu is on the central reaches of the Arakawa River, which flows through the west of the city, whereas the Motoara River flows from the southeastern to central portion.

=== Surrounding municipalities ===
Saitama Prefecture

- Gyōda
- Kazo
- Kitamoto
- Kumagaya
- Kuki
- Okegawa
- Yoshimi

=== Climate ===
Kōnosu has a humid subtropical climate (Köppen Cfa) characterized by warm summers and cool winters with light to no snowfall. The average annual temperature in Kōnosu is 14.6 °C. The average annual rainfall is 1335 mm with September as the wettest month. The temperatures are highest on average in August, at around 26.6 °C, and lowest in January, at around 3.6 °C.

== Demographics ==
Per Japanese census data, the population of Kōnosu has recently plateaued after a long period of growth.

Historical population
Year	Pop.	±%
1960	51,760	—
1970	66,318	+28.1%
1980	86,854	+31.0%
1990	107,124	+23.3%
2000	120,271	+12.3%
2010	119,639	−0.5%
2020	116,828	−2.3%

== History ==
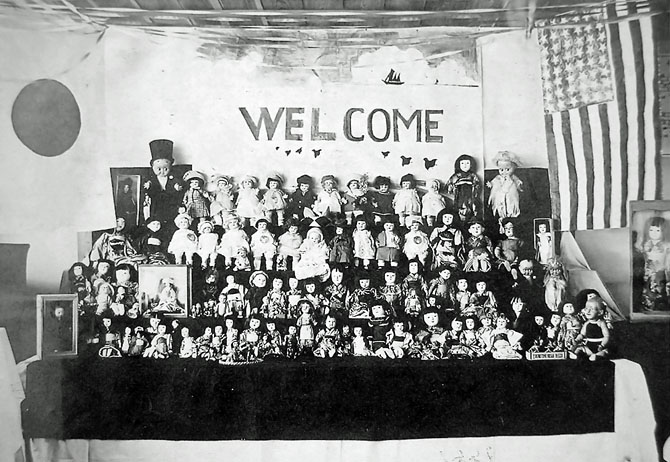
American blue-eyed dolls for Japanese children and Japanese return gift dolls for American children in Kōnosu, 1927

In ancient times, the area around Kōnosu was the center of Musashi Province and there are many kofun burial mounds. The area was a favored falconry site by the Tokugawa shoguns during the Edo period and was also the location of Kōnosu-shuku, a post station on the Nakasendō highway.

The town of Kōnosu was created within Kitaadachi District, Saitama with the establishment of the modern municipalities system on April 1, 1889. On July 1, 1954, Kōnosu annexed the neighboring villages of Mida, Tamamiya, Mamuro and Kasahara (from Kitasaitama District). On September 30, 1954 Kōnosu annexed the village of Jōkō, and was elevated to city status. On October 1, 2005 the villages of Kawasato and Fukiage were also annexed.

== Government ==
Kōnosu has a mayor-council form of government with a directly elected mayor and a unicameral city council of 26 members. Kōnosu contributes two members to the Saitama Prefectural Assembly. In terms of national politics, the city is divided between the Saitama 6th district and Saitama 12th district of the lower house of the Diet of Japan.

== Economy ==
Plastics and electronic components manufacturing are the largest industries in Kōnosu. Flower gardening and rice cultivation are also popular, and Kōnosu is also the main production center for traditional dolls used in the Hinamatsuri festival. The city is also increasingly becoming a commuter town for the Tokyo Metropolis.

== Education ==
Kōnosu has 19 public elementary schools and eight public middle schools operated by the city government, and three public high schools operated by the Saitama Prefectural Board of Education. The prefecture also operates one special education school for the handicapped.

Previously the city housed a Brazilian school, Centro Educacional Canarinho.

== Transportation ==
=== Railway ===
JR East – Takasaki Line

- Kōnosu – Kita-Kōnosu – Fukiage

=== Highway ===
- National Route 17

== Local attractions ==
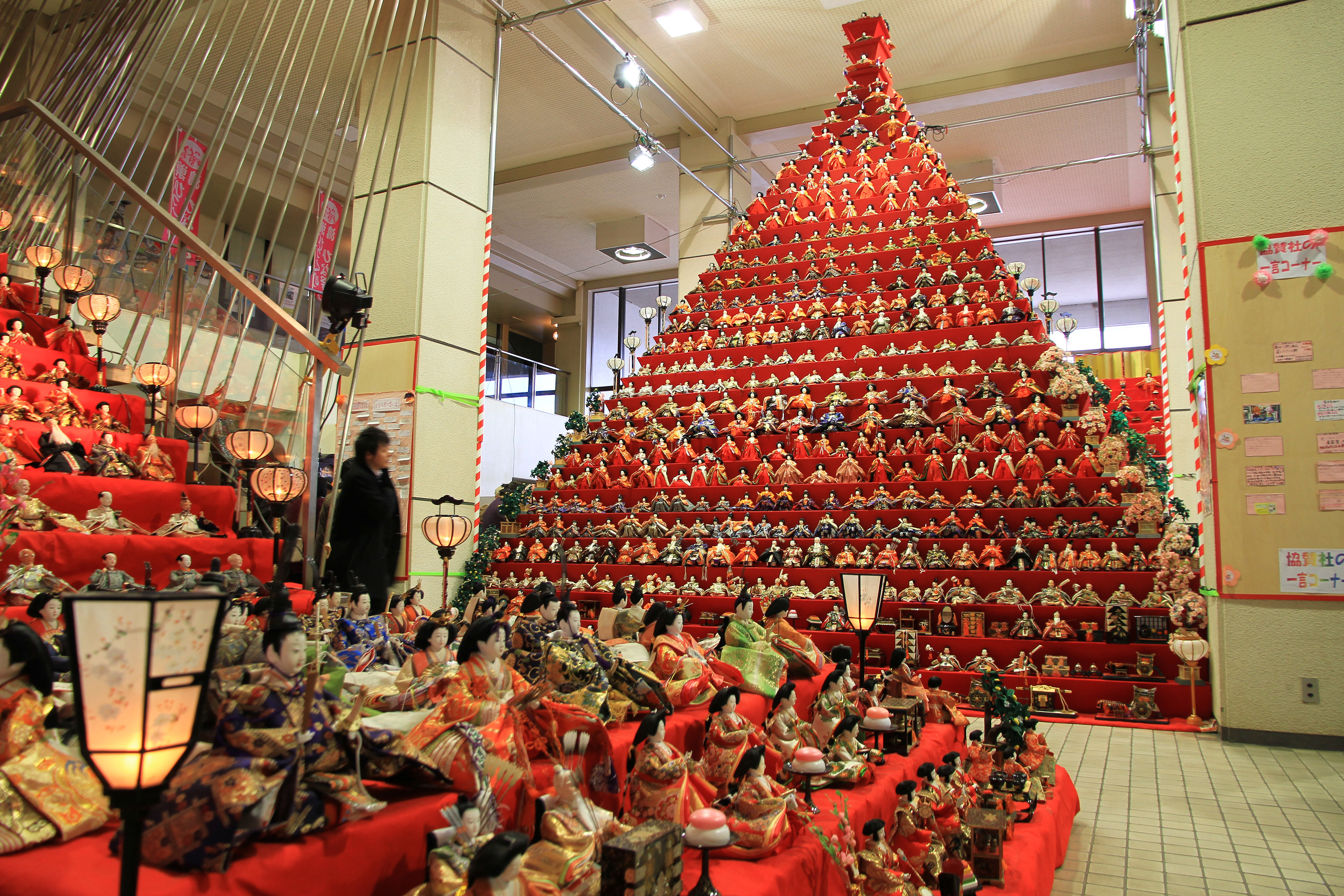
Kōnosu Doll Festival

Kōnosu earned the nickname "Doll Town" for its many "Hina Ningyō" (a type of Japanese doll) factories. Kōnosu is also called "Flower town". It has several flower markets, and many flowers purchased in Tokyo and throughout the Kantō region are grown in Kōnosu.

=== Festivals ===
- Sakura Matsuri
- Natsu Matsuri (Summer Festival)
- Ootori Matsuri (autumn)
- Ojuya (November 13 to November 15)
- Shishimai (August 18)
- Mato Matsuri (January 12)

== Notable people ==
- Aki Ogawa, wheelchair curler
- Chō, voice actor
- Kazuyuki Nakane, politician
- Naomichi Marufuji, professional wrestler
- One, mangaka
- Shōei, actor
- Susumu Takagi, politician
