= Kawajima =

Kawajima 川島町
- Town
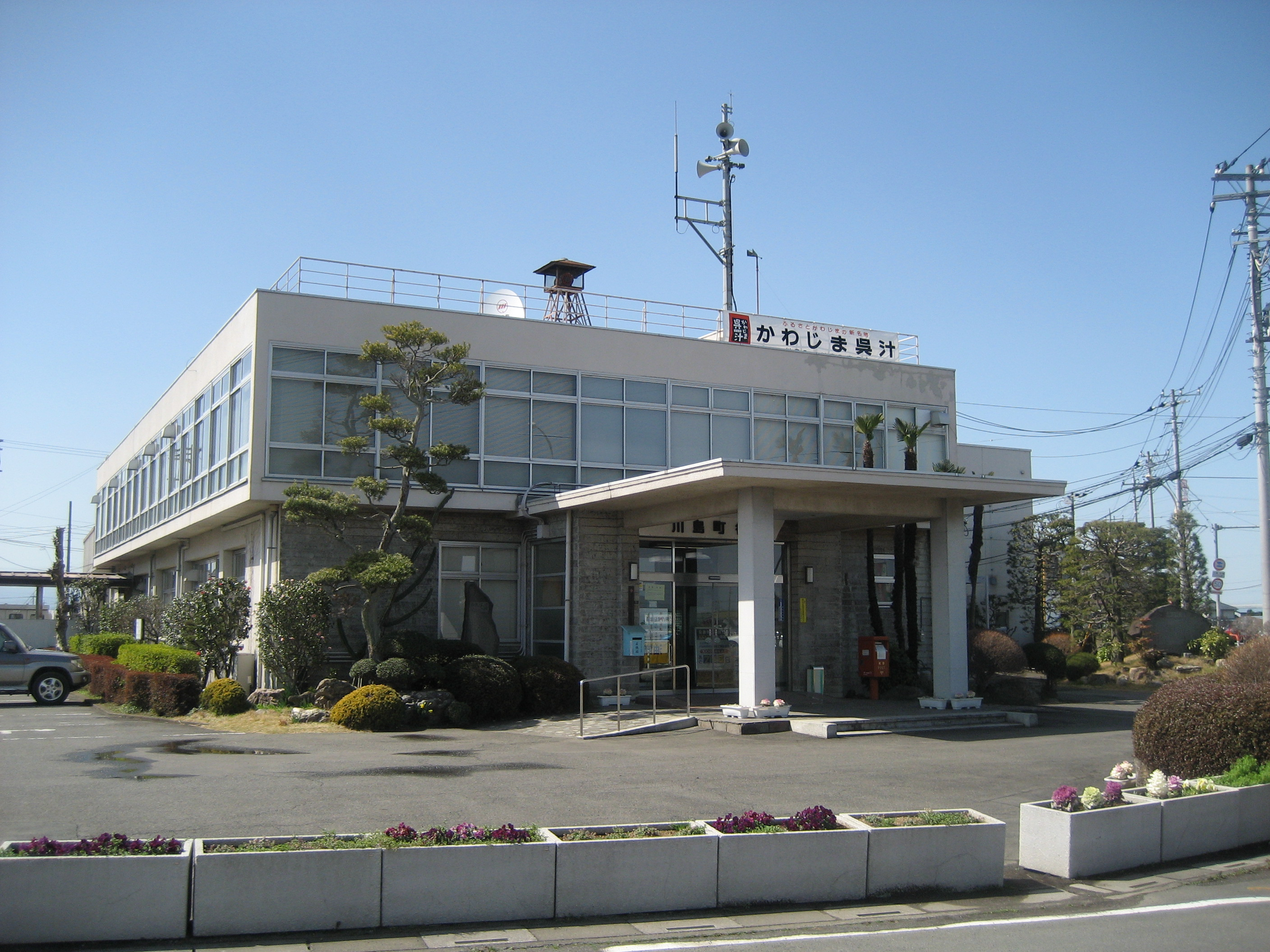
- Kawajima town office

- Flag Seal

- Location of Kawajima in Saitama Prefecture

- Coordinates: 35°58′55.4″N 139°28′53.6″E
- Country: Japan
- Region: Kantō
- Prefecture: Saitama
- District: Hiki

Area
  - Total: 41.63 km^{2} (16.07 sq mi)

Population (March 2021)
  - Total: 19,653
  - Density: 472.1/km^{2} (1,223/sq mi)
- Time zone: UTC+9 (Japan Standard Time)
- Tree: Osmanthus fragrans
- Flower: Iris
- Bird: Eurasian skylark
- Phone number: 049-299-1751
- Address: 1175 Hiranuma, Kawajima-machi, Hiki-gun, Saitama-ken 350-0192
- Website: Official website

Kawajima (川島町, Kawajima-machi) is a town located in Saitama Prefecture, Japan. As of 1 March 2021, the town had an estimated population of 19,653 in 8105 households and a population density of 470 persons per km^{2}. The total area of the town is 41.63 square kilometres (16.07 sq mi).

== Geography ==
Kawajima is located in the Arakawa River drainage basis in central Saitama Prefecture.

=== Surrounding municipalities ===
Saitama Prefecture

- Ageo
- Higshimatsuyama
- Kawagoe
- Kitamoto
- Okegawa
- Sakado
- Yoshimi

=== Climate ===
Kawajima has a humid subtropical climate (Köppen Cfa) characterized by warm summers and cool winters with light to no snowfall. The average annual temperature in Kawajima is 14.4 °C. The average annual rainfall is 1448 mm with September as the wettest month. The temperatures are highest on average in August, at around 26.3 °C, and lowest in January, at around 3.0 °C.

== Demographics ==
Per Japanese census data, the population of Kawajima peaked around the year 2000 and has declined since.

Historical population
Year	Pop.	±%
1920	15,255	—
1930	15,216	−0.3%
1940	15,794	+3.8%
1950	18,014	+14.1%
1960	16,443	−8.7%
1970	15,049	−8.5%
1980	17,393	+15.6%
1990	21,946	+26.2%
2000	23,322	+6.3%
2010	22,147	−5.0%
2020	19,378	−12.5%

== History ==
The village of Kawajima was created on November 3, 1954, by the merger of the villages of Nakamura, Igusa, Mionoya, Demaru, Yatsuho, and Omino. It was elevated to town status on November 3, 1972.

== Government ==
Kawajima has a mayor-council form of government with a directly elected mayor and a unicameral town council of 14 members. Kawajima, together with the city of Higashimatsuyama and the town of Yoshimi, contributes two members to the Saitama Prefectural Assembly. In terms of national politics, the town is part of Saitama 10th district of the lower house of the Diet of Japan.

== Economy ==
Honda has an assembly plant in Kawajima, which is a major local employer.

== Education ==
Kawajima has four public elementary schools and two public middle schools operated by the town government. The town does not have a high school. The Saitama Prefectural Board of Education operates one special education school for the handicapped.

== Transportation ==
=== Railway ===
- Kawajima does not have any passenger rail service

=== Highway ===
- Ken-Ō Expressway
- National Route 254

=== Airports ===
- Honda Airport

== Noted people from Kawajima ==
- Taimei Yamaguchi, politician
