= Saitama Prefecture =

Prefecture of Japan

Saitama Prefecture 埼玉県
- Prefecture

Japanese transcription(s)
  - Japanese: 埼玉県
  - Rōmaji: Saitama-ken
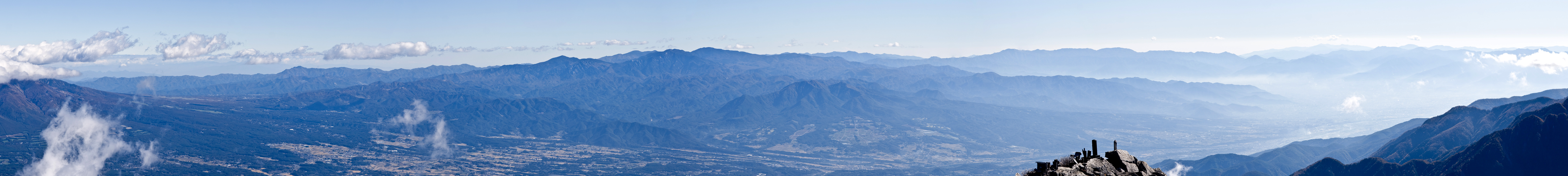
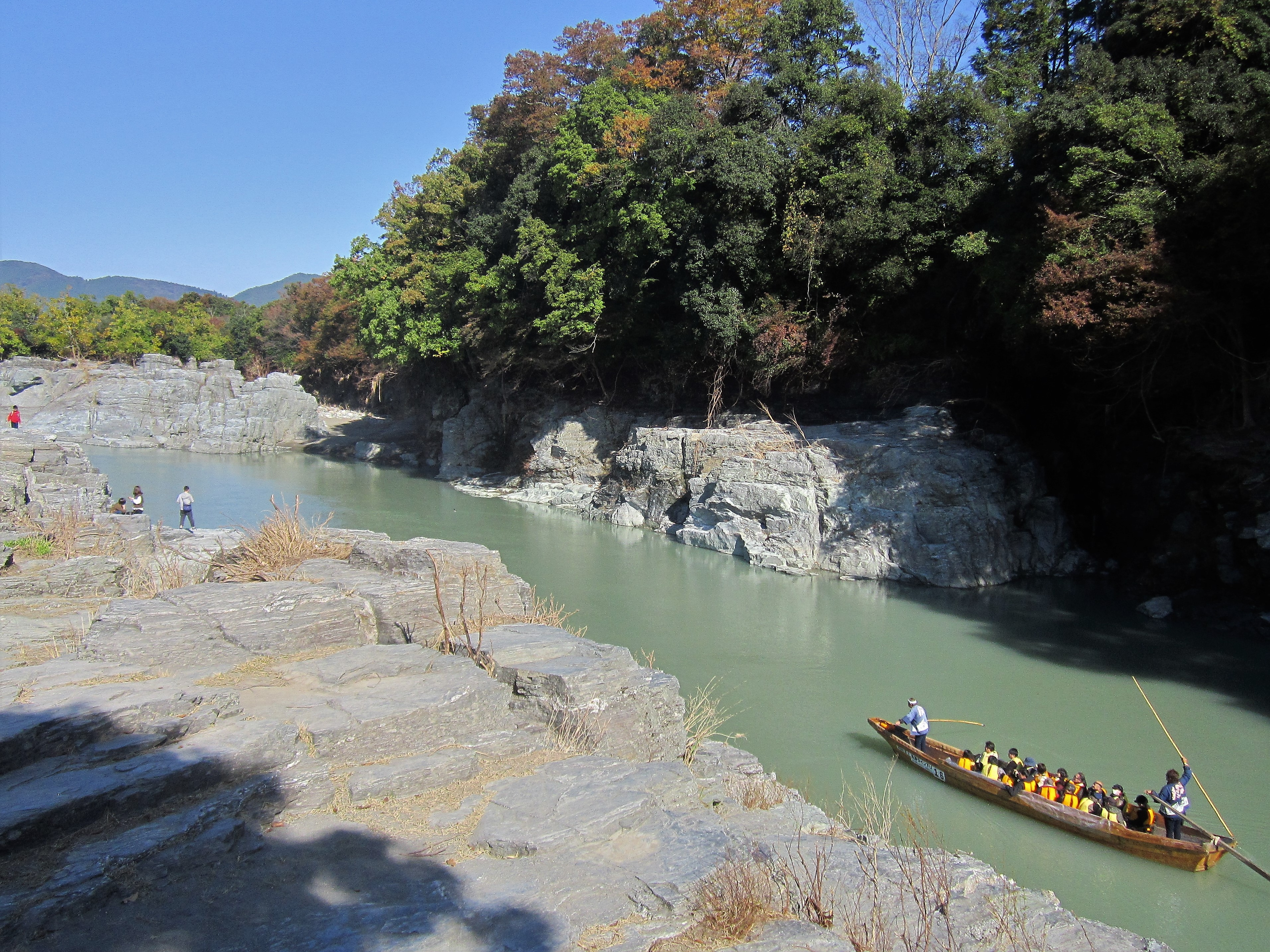
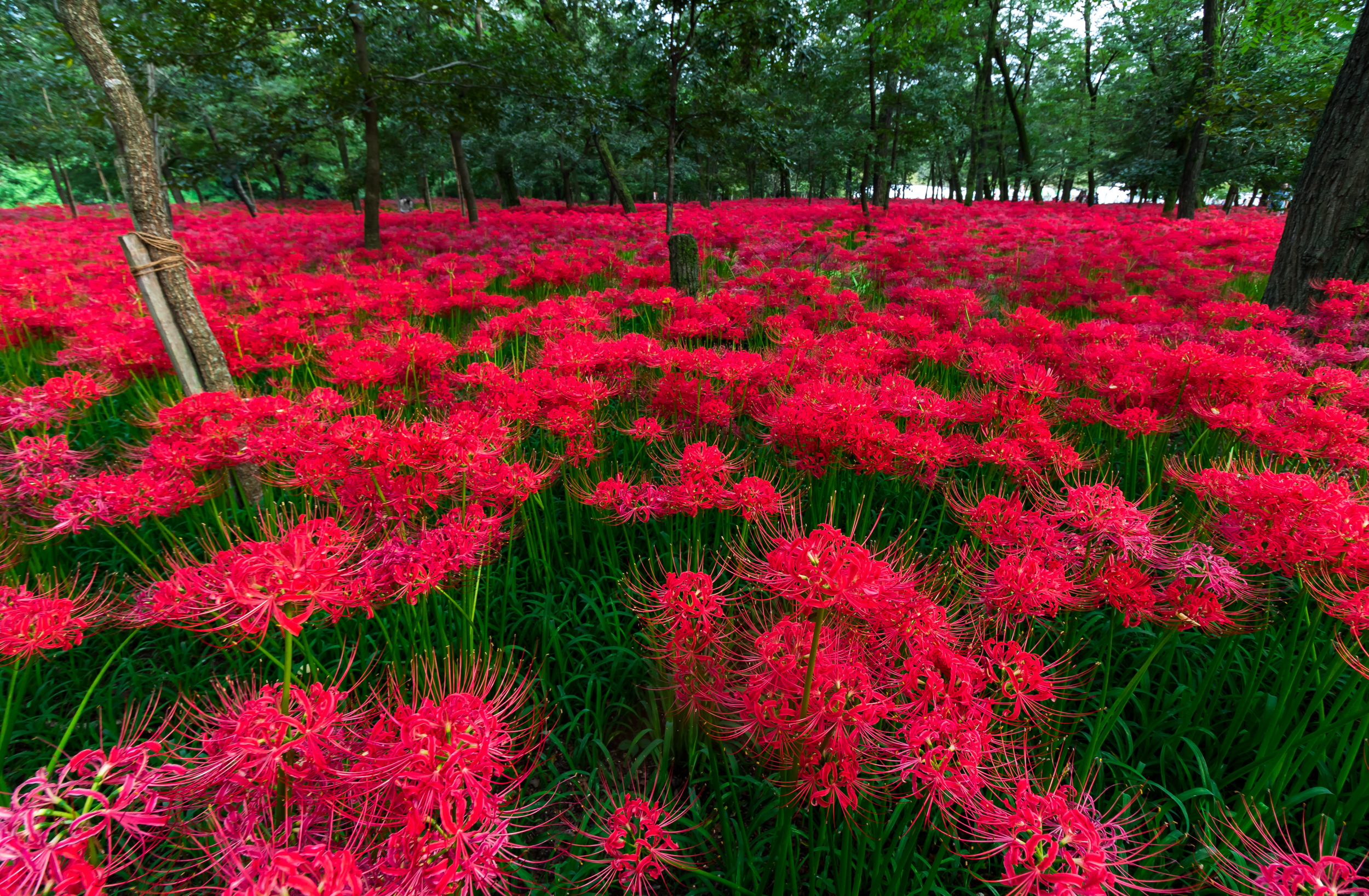
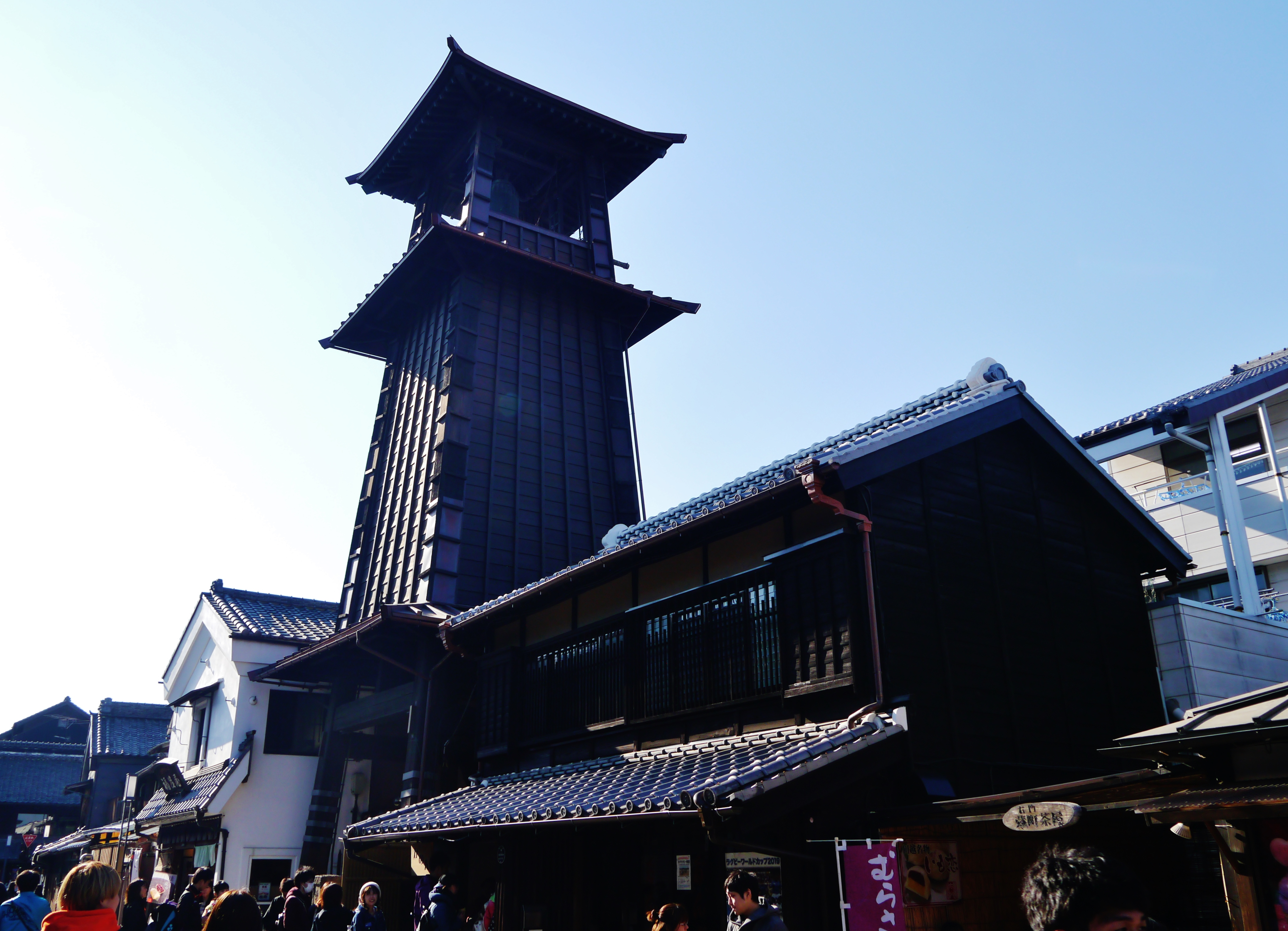
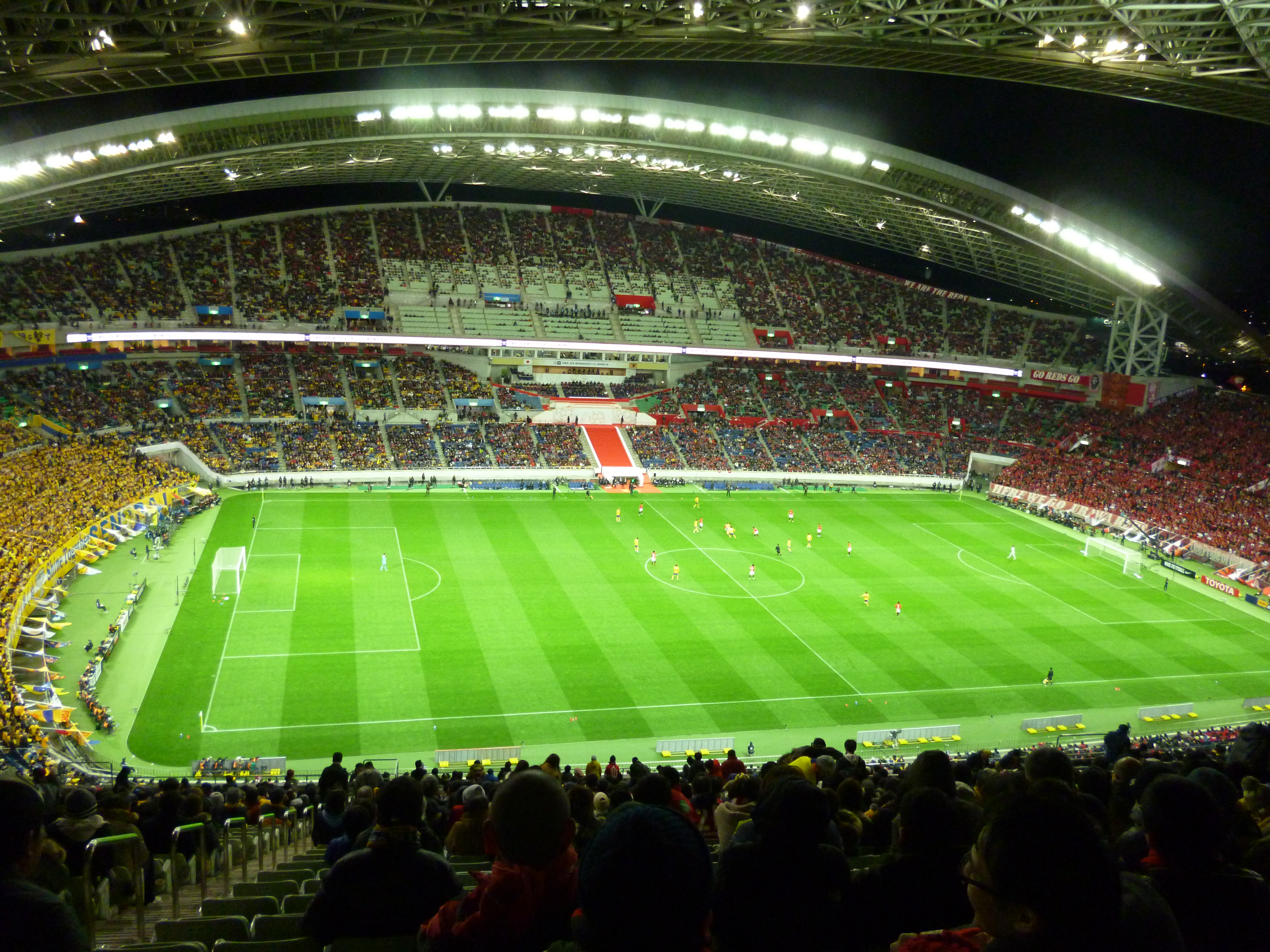
- Okuchichibu Mountains Nagatoro gorge Lycoris radiata in Kinchakuda Kawagoe Time Bell Tower Saitama Stadium 2002

- Flag Symbol
- Anthem: Saitama kenka
- Coordinates: 35°57′N 139°33′E
- Country: Japan
- Region: Kantō
- Island: Honshu
- Capital: Saitama
- Subdivisions: Districts: 8, Municipalities: 63

Government
  - Governor: Motohiro Ōno

Area
  - Total: 3,797.75 km^{2} (1,466.32 sq mi)
  - Rank: 39th

Population (January 1, 2020)
  - Total: 7,338,536
  - Rank: 5th
  - Density: 1,932.34/km^{2} (5,004.73/sq mi)

GDP
  - Total: JP¥23.462 billion US$182.2 billion (2022)
- ISO 3166 code: JP-11
- Website: www.pref.saitama.lg.jp
- Symbols of Japan
- Bird: Eurasian collared dove (Streptopelia decaocto)
- Flower: Primrose (Primula sieboldii)
- Tree: Keyaki (Zelkova serrata)

Saitama Prefecture (埼玉県, Saitama-ken; Japanese pronunciation: [sä́ì.tä̀.mä̀, sä̀í.tä́.mä́(.kè̞ɴ̀)]) is an inland prefecture of Japan located in the Kantō region of Honshu. Saitama Prefecture has a population of 7,287,447 (september 1, 2026) and has a geographic area of 3,797 km^{2} (1,466 sq mi). Saitama Prefecture borders Tochigi Prefecture and Gunma Prefecture to the north, Nagano Prefecture to the west, Yamanashi Prefecture to the southwest, Tokyo to the south, Chiba Prefecture to the southeast, and Ibaraki Prefecture to the northeast.

Saitama is the capital and largest city of Saitama Prefecture, with other major cities including Kawaguchi, Kawagoe, and Tokorozawa.

== History of Kujiki ==
According to Sendai Kuji Hongi (Kujiki), Chichibu was one of 137 provinces during the reign of Emperor Sujin. Chichibu Province was in western Saitama.

The area that would become Saitama Prefecture in the 19th century is part of Musashi Province in the Ritsuryō (or ryō-system; ritsu stands for the penal code, ryō for the administrative code) Imperial administration of antiquity (see Provinces of Japan and the 5 (go) capital area provinces (ki)/7 (shichi) circuits (dō) system) which was nominally revived in the Meiji restoration but has lost much of its administrative function since the Middle Ages. Saitama District (Saitama-gun) was one of Musashi's 21 ritsuryō districts.

In the fifth year of the Keiun era (708), deposits of copper were reported to have been found in the Chichibu District of what is now Saitama Prefecture.

The Saitama area was historically known as a fertile agricultural region which produced much of the food for the Kantō region. During the Edo period, many fudai daimyōs ruled small domains within the Saitama area.

At the end of the early modern Edo period, large parts of present-day Saitama were part of the shogunate domain (baku-ryō) or the often subsumed holdings of smaller vassals (hatamoto-ryō) around Edo, major areas were part of the fiefdoms (-han) Kawagoe (ruled by Matsui/Matsudaira, fudai), Oshi (Okudaira-Matsudaira, fudai) and Iwatsuki (Ōoka, fudai); few territories were held by domains seated in other provinces.

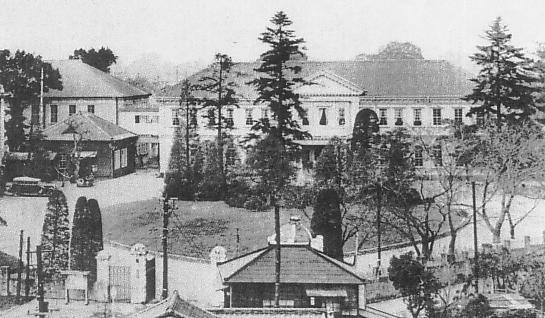
The prefectural government building of Saitama in the early 20th century

In the Meiji Restoration, after being briefly united with other rural shogunate territories in Musashi under Musashi governors (Musashi chikenji), many former shogunate/hatamoto territories in Northwestern Musashi became Ōmiya Prefecture (大宮県, Ōmiya-ken), soon renamed to Urawa (浦和県, -ken) in 1868/69, with some territories held by other short-lived prefectures (Iwahana/later mainly Gunma and Nirayama/later mainly Shizuoka, Kanagawa and Tokyo). In the replacement of -han with -ken, the associated territorial consolidation (removal of feudal era ex-/enclaves) and first wave of prefectural mergers in 1871/72, Oshi and Iwatsuki prefectures were merged into Urawa; after consolidation, it consisted of the entire Saitama District and Northern parts of Adachi and Katsushika (But at that time, "major and minor districts", 大区, daiku and 小区, shōku, served as administrative subdivisions) and was renamed to Saitama. The government of the prefecture was to be set up in Iwatsuki Town, Saitama District in November 1871 by the Dajōkan ordinance to set up the prefecture, but ultimately remained in Urawa's previous prefectural government seat in Urawa Town in Adachi District.

Kawagoe Prefecture was consolidated with other territories into Iruma Prefecture (入間県, Iruma-ken; government seat unchanged from Kawagoe domain/prefecture: Kawagoe Town, Iruma District) which consisted of 13 districts of Musashi in the Western part of present-day Saitama. In 1873, Iruma was merged with Gunma (capital: Takasaki Town, Gunma District) to become Kumagaya (capital: Kumagaya Town, Ōsato District). But Kumagaya was split up again in 1876: The area of Kōzuke province came back as a second Gunma prefecture, and the territories in Musashi province/former Iruma prefecture were merged into Saitama. Except for the transfer of a few municipalities to Tokyo in the 1890s/1900s (see below) and several smaller, 20th-century changes through cross-prefectural municipal mergers or transfers of neighbourhoods, Saitama had reached its present extent.

The nine 19th/20th-century districts of Saitama with 21st-century municipal borders overlaid. From the east, dark violet: North Katsushika, light blue: North Saitama, dark blue: South Saitama, pink: North Adachi, orange: Iruma, pale yellow: Hiki, dark green: Ōsato, pale green: Kodama, purple: Chichibu.

In the modern reactivation of districts as administrative unit in 1878/79, Saitama was subdivided into originally 18 districts based on the ancient divisions of Musashi, but with only nine (joint) district government offices, and the number of districts was formally merged down to nine in 1896/97: North Adachi, Iruma, Hiki, Chichibu, Kodama, Ōsato, North Saitama, South Saitama, and North Katsushika. Niikura (also known as Niiza, Shiki or Shiragi), one of the original 1878/79 modern districts, was first merged into North Adachi in 1896, but a substantial part of its former territory was subsequently transferred to the North Tama and North Toshima districts of Tokyo. In the creation of modern cities, towns and villages in 1889, these districts were subdivided into originally 40 towns and 368 villages. The first city in Saitama was only established in 1922 when Kawagoe Town from Iruma District became Kawagoe City. The prefectural capital, Urawa in North Adachi, remained a town until 1934. After the Great Shōwa mergers of the 1950s, the number of municipalities in Saitama had shrunk to 95, including 23 cities by then. The Great Heisei mergers of the 2000s pushed the number below 70.

After World War II, as Tokyo expanded rapidly and modern transportation allowed longer commutes, the lack of available land in Tokyo led to the rapid development of Saitama Prefecture, where the population has nearly tripled since 1960. Most of the cities in the prefecture are closely connected to downtown Tokyo by metropolitan rail, and operate largely as residential and commercial suburbs of Tokyo.

In 2001, Urawa City, the capital, was merged with Ōmiya City and Yono City to create Saitama City (Saitama-shi; but unlike the district or the prefecture written with kana) as the new enlarged capital. It became the prefecture's first (and so far only) designated major city in 2003.

== Geography ==
The Tone river is part of Saitama's northern border. The Ara and Edo rivers drain a large part of Saitama.

Map of Saitama Prefecture Government Ordinance Designated City City Town Village

Historical population
Year	Pop.	±% p.a.
1890	1,081,121	—
1903	1,240,280	+1.06%
1913	1,343,674	+0.80%
1920	1,319,533	−0.26%
1925	1,394,461	+1.11%
1930	1,459,172	+0.91%
1935	1,528,854	+0.94%
1940	1,608,039	+1.02%
1945	2,047,261	+4.95%
1950	2,146,445	+0.95%
1955	2,262,623	+1.06%
1960	2,430,871	+1.44%
1965	3,014,983	+4.40%
1970	3,866,472	+5.10%
1975	4,821,340	+4.51%
1980	5,420,480	+2.37%
1985	5,863,678	+1.58%
1990	6,405,319	+1.78%
1995	6,759,311	+1.08%
2000	6,938,006	+0.52%
2005	7,054,243	+0.33%
2010	7,194,556	+0.39%
2015	7,261,271	+0.18%

Saitama Prefecture is bordered by Tokyo, Chiba, Ibaraki, Tochigi, Gunma, Nagano, and Yamanashi Prefectures. It is located central-west of the Kanto region, measuring 103 km from east to west and 52 km from north to south. At 3,797.75 km^{2}, it ranks as the ninth-smallest prefecture. The eastern border with Chiba Prefecture is defined by the Edo River. The northern and north-western border lines with Gunma Prefecture are marked by the Tone River and the Kanagawa River and the drainage divides of the Arakawa River and Kanagawa River. The southwestern border is defined by the drainage divides of the Arakawa River, Tama River, and Fuefuki River. The eastern section of the southern border line, however, does not overlap with any geological feature.

The topography of Saitama Prefecture is largely divided by the Hachiōji Tectonic Line, which runs through Kodama, Ogawa, and Hannō, into the western mountain area and the eastern lowland area. The altitude, highest on the western side, gradually lowers eastward from mountain ranges to hills to plateaus to lowlands. The eastern lowlands and plateaus occupy 67.3% of the area.

The eastern side, part of the Kantō Plain, can be further divided into nine separate expanses of hills and ten plateaus. The former occupy small areas neighboring the Kantō Mount Range, including the Hiki Hills and Sayama Hills. The latter are mainly surrounded by alluvial flood plains. In the southeastern portion of the prefecture, the Ōmiya Plateau stands in a southeastward direction, sandwiched by the Furutone River to the east and the Arakawa River to the west.

The western side of the prefecture belongs to the Kantō Mountain Range with Chichibu Basin located in its center. The area to the west of the basin features high peaks such as Mount Sanpō (2,483 m; 三宝山, Sanpō-yama according to the GSI, but often read Sanpō-zan) on the Western border with Nagano, Saitama's highest mountain, and Mount Kōbushi (2,475 m), in which the Arakawa River has its source. Most of the land is contained in Chichibu Tama Kai National Park. The area to east of the basin consists of relatively low mountains.

=== Cities ===
Name		Area (km^{2})	Population	Population density (per km^{2})	Map
Rōmaji	Kanji	Area (km^{2})	Population	Population density (per km^{2})	Map
Ageo	上尾市	45.51	229,517	5043.22	
Asaka	朝霞市	18.34	143,195	7807.80	
Chichibu	秩父市	577.83	61,159	105.84	
Fujimi	富士見市	19.77	112,211	5675.82	
Fujimino	ふじみ野市	14.64	114,566	7825.55	
Fukaya	深谷市	138.37	142,803	1032.04	
Gyōda	行田市	67.49	80,236	1188.86	
Hannō	飯能市	193.05	79,123	409.86	
Hanyū	羽生市	58.64	54,304	926.06	
Hasuda	蓮田市	27.28	61,540	2255.87	
Hidaka	日高市	47.48	55,294	1164.58	
Higashimatsuyama	東松山市	65.33	90,456	1384.60	
Honjō	本庄市	89.69	77,900	868.55	
Iruma	入間市	44.69	147,166	3293.04	
Kasukabe	春日部市	66.00	233,278	3534.52	
Kawagoe	川越市	109.13	353,214	3236.64	
Kawaguchi	川口市	61.95	607,373	9804.25	
Kazo	加須市	133.30	112,792	846.15	
Kitamoto	北本市	19.82	66,022	3331.08	
Kōnosu	鴻巣市	67.44	117,995	1749.63	
Koshigaya	越谷市	60.24	345,353	5732.95	
Kuki	久喜市	82.41	152,569	1851.34	
Kumagaya	熊谷市	159.82	195,227	1221.54	
Misato	三郷市	30.13	142,835	4740.62	
Niiza	新座市	22.78	166,208	7296.23	
Okegawa	桶川市	25.35	75,218	2967.18	
Saitama (capital)	さいたま市	217.43	1,324,854	6093.24	
Sakado	坂戸市	41.02	100,612	2452.76	
Satte	幸手市	33.93	50,256	1481.17	
Sayama	狭山市	48.99	149,826	3058.30	
Shiki	志木市	9.05	76,445	8446.96	
Shiraoka	白岡市	24.92	52,431	2103.97	
Sōka	草加市	27.46	249,645	9091.22	
Toda	戸田市	18.19	140,902	7746.12	
Tokorozawa	所沢市	72.11	344,194	4773.18	
Tsurugashima	鶴ヶ島市	17.65	69,937	3962.44	
Wakō	和光市	11.04	84,161	7623.28	
Warabi	蕨市	5.11	75,679	14809.98	
Yashio	八潮市	18.02	92,512	5133.85	
Yoshikawa	吉川市	31.7	73,262	2311.10	

=== Towns and villages ===
Saitama prefecture population pyramid in 2020

These are the towns and villages in each district:

Name		Area (km^{2})	Population	District	Map
Rōmaji	Kanji	Area (km^{2})	Population	District	Map
Hatoyama	鳩山町	25.73	13,414	Hiki District	
Higashichichibu	東秩父村	37.06	2,701	Chichibu District	
Ina	伊奈町	14.79	44,928	Kitaadachi District	
Kamikawa	神川町	47.40	13,369	Kodama District	
Kamisato	上里町	29.18	30,836	Kodama District	
Kawajima	川島町	41.63	19,653	Hiki District	
Matsubushi	松伏町	16.20	28,787	Kitakatsushika District	
Minano	皆野町	63.74	9,497	Chichibu District	
Misato	美里町	33.41	11,096	Kodama District	
Miyashiro	宮代町	15.95	33,823	Minamisaitama District	
Miyoshi	三芳町	15.33	38,101	Iruma District	
Moroyama	毛呂山町	34.07	33,178	Iruma District	
Nagatoro	長瀞町	30.43	6,838	Chichibu District	
Namegawa	滑川町	29.68	19,594	Hiki District	
Ogano	小鹿野町	171.26	11,192	Chichibu District	
Ogawa	小川町	60.36	28,971	Hiki District	
Ogose	越生町	40.39	11,352	Iruma District	
Ranzan	嵐山町	29.92	17,755	Hiki District	
Sugito	杉戸町	30.03	44,402	Kitakatsushika District	
Tokigawa	ときがわ町	55.90	10,880	Hiki District	
Yokoze	横瀬町	49.36	8,106	Chichibu District	
Yorii	寄居町	64.25	32,851	Ōsato District	
Yoshimi	吉見町	38.64	18,594	Hiki District	

== Transportation ==
Radial transportation to and from Tokyo dominates transportation in the prefecture. Circular routes were constructed as bypasses to avoid congestion in central Tokyo.

=== Roads ===
The Jōban, Kan-etsu, Shuto, Tōhoku, and Tokyo-Gaikan expressways form parts of the nationwide expressway network. National highway Routes 4, 16, and 17 are important routes in Kantō region.

=== Railways ===
Ōmiya Station in Saitama City forms East Japan Railway Company's northern hub station in the Greater Tokyo Area, offering transfers to and from Shinkansen high-speed lines. The Musashino serves as a freight bypass line as well as a passenger line. Chichibu Railway the northwestern, Seibu Railway the southwestern, Tobu Railway the midwestern and the eastern, the New Shuttle and Saitama Railway the southeastern parts of the prefecture respectively. The Tsukuba Express line crosses the southeastern corner of the prefecture.

- East Japan Railway Company
  - Tōhoku Shinkansen
  - Jōetsu Shinkansen
  - Utsunomiya Line (Tōhoku Main Line)
  - Takasaki Line
  - Shōnan-Shinjuku Line
  - Keihin-Tōhoku Line
  - Saikyō Line
  - Musashino Line
  - Kawagoe Line
  - Hachikō Line
- Tobu
  - Isesaki Line
  - Tojo Line
  - Nikko Line
  - Noda Line
  - Skytree Line
- Seibu
  - Ikebukuro Line
  - Shinjuku Line
  - Chichibu Line
  - Sayama Line
- Tokyo Metro
  - Fukutoshin Line
  - Yurakucho Line
- Tsukuba Express
- Saitama Rapid Railway Line
- Chichibu Railway
  - Chichibu Mainline
  - Mikajiri Line

=== People movers ===
- Saitama New Urban Transit (New Shuttle)
- Seibu Yamaguchi Line (Leo Liner)

=== Airports ===
Haneda Airport and Narita International Airport are the closest major civil airports. Commuter helicopter flights from Kawajima to Narita Airport are offered.

Honda Airport for general aviation, and the JASDF's Iruma Air Base and Kumagaya Air Base.

=== Waterways ===
Rivers and canals, including those developed in the Edo period (17th – 19th centuries) in the east of the prefecture, are largely disused following the introduction of motorised land transport. Traces of water transport are found on the Tone River, which forms the border between Saitama and Gunma Prefecture, and on the Arakawa River, which includes a tourist attraction in Nagatoro.

== Culture ==
=== Mass media ===
See Mass media in Saitama Prefecture.

== Politics and government ==
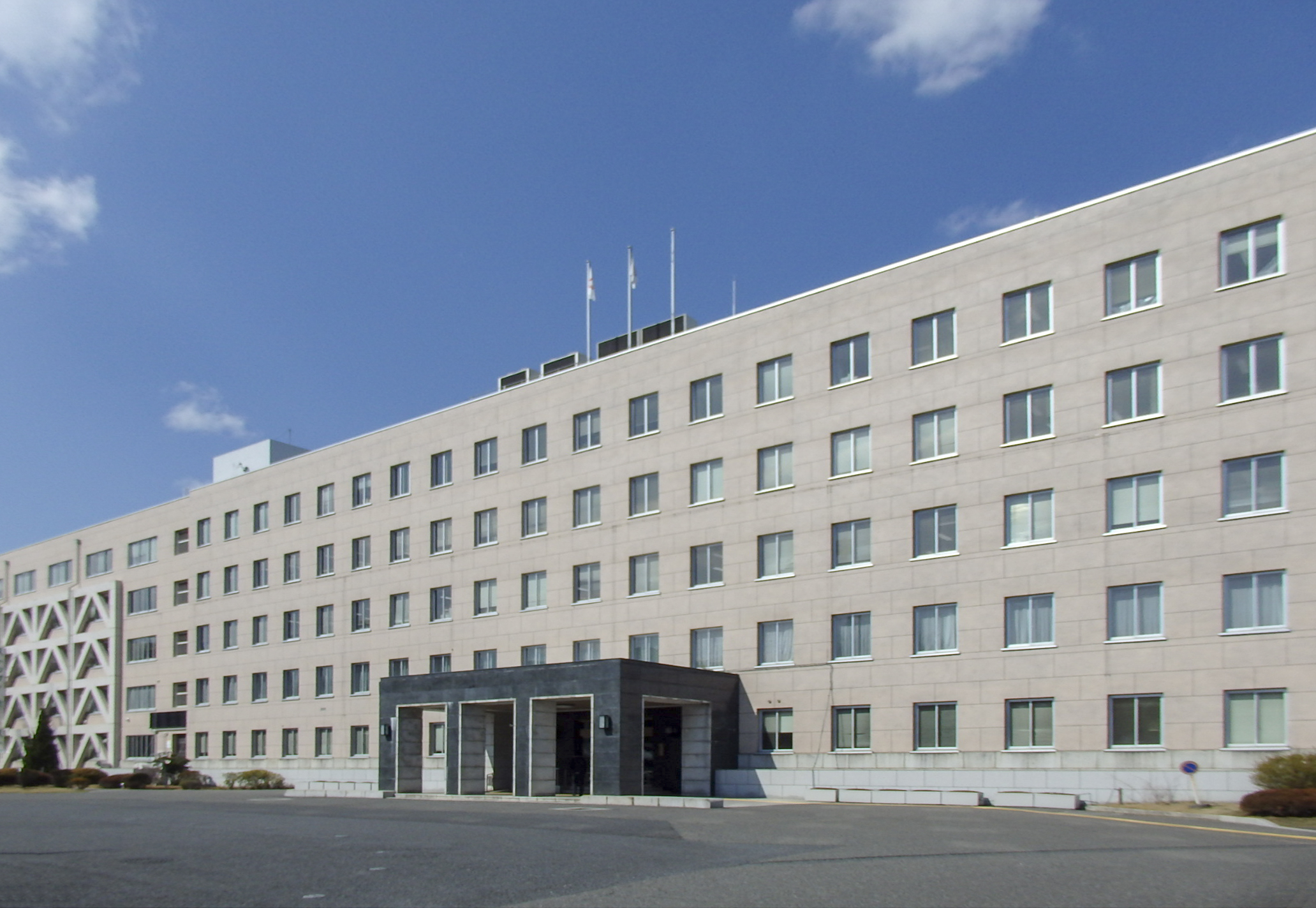
The current prefectural government [main] building in Saitama City

Like all prefectural administrations, Saitama's is headed by a governor ([ken-]chiji) who is directly elected to four-year terms since 1947. The current incumbent is Motohiro Ōno, a former DPFP member of the Diet who was elected in August 2019 with centre-left support (CDP, DPFP, SDP) and 47.9% of the vote against centre-right supported (LDP, Kōmeitō) former baseball player Kenta Aoshima (44.9%) and three other candidates.

Also as in all prefectures, prefectural by-laws, the budget and the approval of important prefectural administrative appointments such as the vice-governors or members of the public safety commission, are the prerogative of the assembly which is elected directly to four-year terms on an independent electoral cycle. That may or may not be synchronized with the gubernatorial term; currently, it is not, as it is still part of the unified local election cycle (Saitama gubernatorial elections already left the unified cycle in 1949). In the last round in April 2019, the LDP maintained its outright majority with 48 of the 93 seats in the assembly. As in most prefectures, the Saitama assembly was established legally in 1878 and first convened 1879.

In the National Diet, Saitama's directly elected delegation consists of 15 members of the House of Representatives and currently seven (four per class, but only raised from three in 2019, so it will only grow to eight after the 2022 election) in the House of Councillors. The latest prefecture-wide election was the House of Councillors by-election in October 2019 to fill the seat vacated by Motohiro Ōno; it was won by the previous governor Kiyoshi Ueda who has a centre-left background (DPJ member of the House of Representatives for Saitama's 4th district before his term as governor), but without full-scale party backing and without any other major party-backed candidate in the race.

=== List of governors since 1947 ===
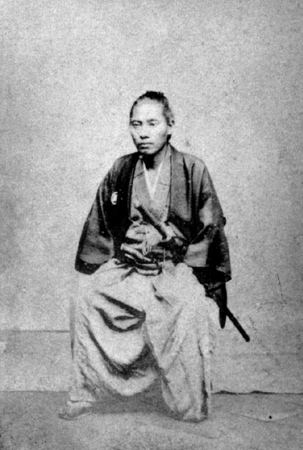
Nomura Morihide, a samurai from Satsuma Domain which had won the Boshin War to take over government together with its allies in the Meiji Restoration, briefly became the first governor (called kenrei in the first decades) of Saitama in 1871. The first Saitama native to take the office was the 43rd governor, Yūichi Ōsawa in 1949.

Governor	Term start	Term end
Jitsuzo Nishimura (西村実造)	12 April 1947	28 March 1949
Yuichi Osawa (大沢雄一)	17 May 1949	28 May 1956
Hiroshi Kurihara (栗原浩)	13 July 1956	12 July 1972
Yawara Hata (畑和)	13 July 1972	12 July 1992
Yoshihiko Tsuchiya (土屋義彦)	13 July 1992	18 July 2003
Kiyoshi Ueda (上田清司)	31 August 2003	30 August 2019
Motohiro Ōno(大野元裕)	31 August 2019	Incumbent

=== International relations ===
Saitama Prefecture has a number of sister city relationships with states and a province as listed below (in chronological order).

- Mexico State, Mexico, affiliated on October 2, 1979
- Shanxi province, China, affiliated on October 27, 1982
- Queensland, Australia, affiliated on October 27, 1984
- Ohio, United States, affiliated on October 22, 1990
- Brandenburg, Germany, affiliated on August 26, 1998

== Sports ==
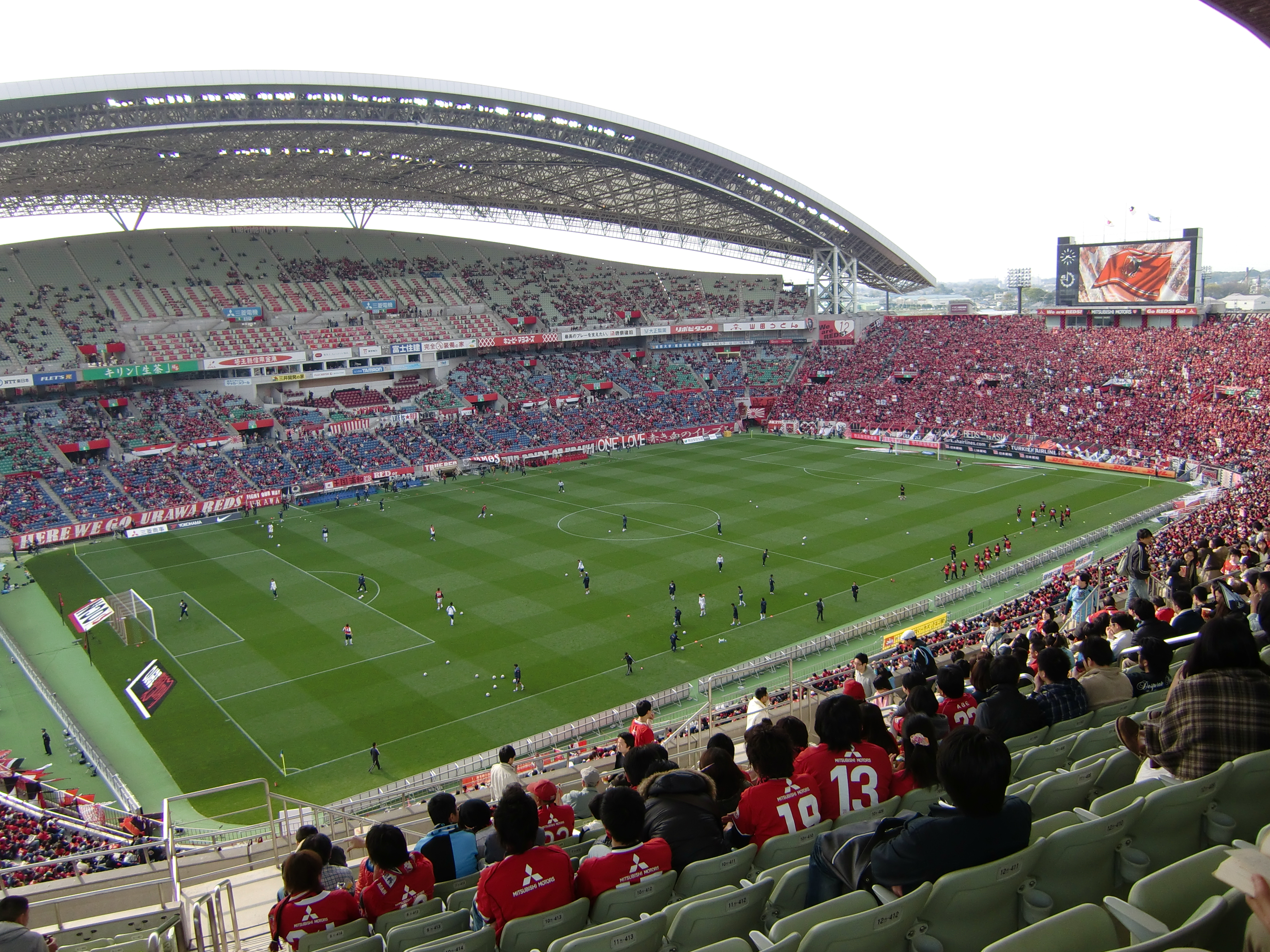
Saitama Stadium 2002

The sports teams listed below are based in Saitama.

=== Association football ===
- Urawa Red Diamonds (Saitama)
- Omiya Ardija (Saitama)

=== Baseball ===
- Saitama Seibu Lions (Tokorozawa)

=== Basketball ===
- Koshigaya Alphas (Koshigaya)
- Saitama Broncos (Tokorozawa)

=== Volleyball ===
- Ageo Medics (Ageo)

=== Rugby union ===
- Secom Rugguts (Sayama)

== Tourism ==
Most of the popular tourist sites in Saitama are located in the northwestern part of the prefecture, which is known as the Chichibu Region. This region mostly consists of a hilly and moderately mountainous area, and is situated in a rich natural environment. The region is very popular among residents of Saitama and neighboring prefectures for short trips, as it is easily accessible via the railroad network.

=== Visitor attractions ===
- Chichibu 34 Kannon Sanctuary
- Chichibu Shrine
- Ranzan Valley
- Gyoda City Provincial Museum
- Iwatsuki Doll Museum
- Railway Museum (Saitama)
- Kitain Temple
- Omiya Bonsai Village
- Nagatoro Valley
- Saitama New Urban Center
- Saitama Super Arena
- Sankenkyō
- Seibuen Amusement Park
- Sakitama Hill
- Urawa Art Museum

== Mascot ==
Kobaton (コバトン) is the prefectural mascot, a Eurasian collared dove, which is also the prefectural bird. Kobaton was made originally as the mascot of the fifty-ninth annual national athletic meeting held in the prefecture in 2004, and was inaugurated as mascot of the prefecture in 2005 with an inauguration ceremony and a letter of appointment from the governor. A wheelchair-using version of Kobaton also exists.

== Notable people ==
- Hiroshi Hasebe (born 1956, Makoto Matsuno), theatre critic and university professor
- Yuki Kawauchi (born 1987), marathon runner
- Momoka Muraoka (born 1997), para alpine skier
- Mamoru Miyano (born 1983), actor and singer
- Akie Nakata, stone artist
- Rie Takahashi (born 1994), voice actor and singer
- Mayu Watanabe
- Anna Yamada

== Festivals and events ==
- Chichibu night festival (Chichibu)
- Yono summer festival (Saitama City)

== See also ==
- Saitama Bank
- Sayama Tea, a tea variety grown in Saitama prefecture
- Thirteen Buddhas of Chichibu
- One-Punch Man
- Yukino Ichikawa (1976 - )
