= Hayato Chishiki =

Japanese motorcycle racer (born 2011)

Hayato Chishiki 知識 隼和
- Born: 11 July 2011 (age 15); Osaka Prefecture, Japan
- Nationality: Japanese
- Bike number: 16

Championship titles
- Moto4 Asia Cup (2026)
Statistics
Moto4 Asia Cup
Active years	2026–
Championships	1
Manufacturer	Honda
Starts / Wins / Podiums / Poles / F. laps / Points; 12 / 5 / 5 / 1 / 0 / 170
All Japan J-GP3
Active years	2025–
Championships	0
Manufacturer	Honda
Team(s)	TN45 Mirai Racing
Last season (2026)	10th (38 pts)
Starts / Wins / Podiums / Poles / F. laps / Points; 9 / 1 / 1 / 0 / 1 / 38

Hayato Chishiki (Japanese: 知識 隼和, Hepburn: Chishiki Hayato; born 11 July 2011) is a Japanese motorcycle racer who competes in the Moto4 Asia Cup. He is the 2026 Moto4 Asia Cup champion.

Chishiki has competed in the All Japan Road Race Championship's J-GP3 and ST600 classes in 2025 and 2026. He is part of Tetsuta Nagashima's rider development program TN45.

== Career ==
=== Early career ===
Chishiki was born in the Osaka Prefecture, in Japan. In 2021, he participated in the Daijiro Cup, specifically in the 74Daijiro class. He won every race of the calendar except the final round, where he finished second. Chishiki later relocated to the Saitama Prefecture in order to make the jump to minibikes in 2022.

=== FIM MiniGP (2022–2024) ===
Chishiki joined the newly established FIM MiniGP Japan in 2022. He clinched his maiden podium in his fourth race in the class, after finishing in second place at Motegi. After a consistent end of the season he was placed sixth overall in his rookie year. That same year, he competed in the NSF100 HRC Trophy where he finished as runner-up.

In 2023, Chishiki entered his second MiniGP season. He scored a second place in the opening race at Okegawa, which would be his only podium in the whole season, and finished in fourth place overall. In 2024, Chishiki faced his third and final year in the MiniGP ladder. He started the season with five consecutive wins at Tsukuba and Okegawa, and went on to clinch the series title at the final round. This result meant he would get the chance to compete in the FIM MiniGP World Series at MotorLand Aragón—representing Japan alongside runner-up Waku Kunitate in the 160cc class. Chishiki finished third in the opening race, followed by a fifth place in Race 2 and an eighth place in the final race. He finished sixth in the championship standings.

=== All Japan Road Race Championship (2025–) ===
==== J-GP3 and ST600 ====
Chishiki entered the 2025 All Japan Road Race Championship with the Tetsuta Nagashima-backed MotoUp Jr Team in the J-GP3 class—with Waku Kunitate as teammate. Aboard a Honda NSF250R, Chishiki had a strong debut season in the All Japan, scoring a seventh place in the opening round at Sugo. In the penultimate round at Okayama, he qualified in the front row after setting the third best lap time, and finished the race in fourth place after a last lap battle with Shizuka Okazaki and Kotaro Togashi. At the end of the season, he was the highest placed Special Participation rider which earned him a direct spot in the 2026 Moto4 Asia Cup.

During the Autopolis round of the 2026 All Japan Road Race Championship, Chishiki made his ST600 debut with TN45 Mirai Racing, aboard a Honda CBR600RR, replacing the injured Tetsuya Fujita. He qualified ninth but crashed in the race when he was running in eighth place.

Chishiki later returned to the J-GP3 class for the Tsukuba and Motegi rounds. After edging out the podium in the Tsukuba race, he set pole position at Motegi and clinched his maiden win in the race, following a last lap battle with Kotaro Togashi and Shingo Iidaka. Chishiki made a third wildcard entry in J-GP3 at the final round at Suzuka. In the rain, he pulled away from the leading group almost immediately after the race start, and led by a wide margin for several laps before crashing out at the 130R corner.

=== Moto4 Asia and European Cup (2026–) ===
On his debut weekend in the Moto4 Asia Cup at Buriram, Chishiki won both races by pulling away from the leading group halfway through each race, beating Waku Kunitate to the line by 0.017 seconds in Race 1. He picked up two more victories in the following rounds at Motegi and Mandalika, as well as a pole position at his home race, maintaining the championship lead he had held since the season opener.

In October 2026, AGR Team announced Chishiki would compete in the final round of the 2026 Moto4 European Cup at Misano as a wildcard, making his debut in Europe. He gradually improved his lap times throughout the weekend but failed to qualify for Sunday's race.

Following his fifth Moto4 Asia Cup win at Sepang, Chishiki arrived to the season finale at Lusail with over a full race's worth of points over title rivals Pranata and Kunitate, and was crowned 2026 Moto4 Asia Cup champion in Race 2, becoming the third rider to take the championship in their rookie season, after Kaito Toba and Billy van Eerde.

== Career statistics ==
=== FIM MiniGP Japan ===
(key) (Races in bold indicate pole position; races in italics indicate fastest lap)

Year	Bike	1	2	3	4	5	6	7	8	9	10	Pos	Pts
2022	Ohvale	TSU; R1; 11	TSU; R2; 6	MOT; R1; 4	MOT; R2; 2	MOT; R1; 14	MOT; R2; Ret	OKE; R1; 4	OKE; R2; 7	TSU; R1; 6	TSU; R2; 5	6th	84
2023	Ohvale	OKE; R1; 2	OKE; R2; 5	MOT; R1; 4	MOT; R2; 4	TSU; R1; Ret	TSU; R2; 4	SUZ; R1; 4	SUZ; R2; 4	OKE; R1; 4	OKE; R2; 4	4th	119
2024	Ohvale	**TSU**; **R1**; 1	TSU; R2; 1	**OKE**; **R1**; 1	**OKE**; **R2**; 1	TSU; R1; 1	TSU; R2; 2	KIN; R1; 3	KIN; R2; 2	**OKE**; **R1**; 1	**OKE**; **R2**; 1	1st	189

=== FIM MiniGP World Series ===
(key) (Races in bold indicate pole position; races in italics indicate fastest lap)

Year	Class	Bike	1	2	3	Pos	Pts
2024	160cc	Ohvale	ARA; R1; 3	ARA; R2; 5	ARA; SFR; 8	6th	43

=== Tsukuba Road Race Championship ===
==== Races by year ====
(key) (Races in bold indicate pole position; races in italics indicate fastest lap. Superscript numbers indicate overall results, including both national and international classes.)

Year	Class	Bike	1	2	3	4	Pos	Pts
2024	J-GP3 (Note: National class.)	Honda	TSU1	TSU2	TSU3	TSU4; 3^{3}	10th	16

=== All Japan Road Race Championship ===
==== Races by year ====
(key) (Races in bold indicate pole position; races in italics indicate fastest lap)

Year	Class	Bike	1	2	3	4	5	6	7	Pos	Pts
2025	J-GP3	Honda	SUG; 7	TSU1; 8	TSU2; 13	MOT; 8	AUT; 9	OKA; 4	SUZ	NC (Note: Competed under a Special Participation license which is ineligible for points.)	-
2026	ST600	Honda	SUG1	SUG2	AUT; 31†					45th	0
2026	J-GP3	Honda				TSU; 4	**MOT**; 1	OKA	SUZ; 25†	10th	38

- † – Rider did not finish the race, but was classified as he completed more than 75% of the race distance.

=== Moto4 Asia Cup ===
==== Races by year ====
(key) (Races in bold indicate pole position, races in italics indicate fastest lap)

Year	Bike	1		2		3		4		5		6		Pos	Pts
Year	Bike	R1	R2	R1	R2	R1	R2	R1	R2	R1	R2	R1	R2	Pos	Pts
2026	Honda	BUR; 1	BUR; 1	SEP; 7	SEP; 5	**MOT**; 1	**MOT**; 4	MAN; 1	MAN; Ret	SEP; 13	SEP; 1	LUS; Ret	LUS; 7	1st	170

=== Moto4 European Cup ===
==== Races by year ====
(key) (Races in bold indicate pole position; races in italics indicate fastest lap)

Year	Bike	1	2	3	4	5	6	7	8	9	10	11	Pos	Pts
2026	Honda	BAR	EST1	EST2	JER1	JER2	MAG1	MAG2	VAL1	VAL2	ARA	MIS; DNQ	NC	0
