= Qabil Irfan =

Malaysian motorcycle racer (born 2012)

- Born: 10 January 2012 (age 14); Terengganu, Malaysia
- Nationality: Malaysian
- Current team: SIC - Gryd Racing
- Bike number: 4
Statistics
Moto4 European Cup
Active years	2026–
Championships	0
Manufacturer	Honda
Last season (2026)	8th (61 pts)
Starts / Wins / Podiums / Poles / F. laps / Points; 7 / 0 / 1 / 0 / 1 / 61
Moto4 Asia Cup
Active years	2026–
Championships	0
Manufacturer	Honda
Last season (2026)	4th (143 pts)
Starts / Wins / Podiums / Poles / F. laps / Points; 8 / 2 / 6 / 1 / 1 / 143

Qabil Irfan Azlan (born 10 January 2012) is a Malaysian motorcycle rider. He last competed in the 2026 Moto4 Asia Cup and is the winner of the 2025 ESBK Spanish Championship – ESBK Talent class and the 2023 MiniGP World Series – 160cc class.

== Career ==
=== Early career ===
Irfan started racing bikes at the age of four and won the 2020 SIC MiniGP Championship, and the 2021 SIC Ohvale Junior Championship.

=== FIM MiniGP and Spanish Superbike Championship (2022–2025) ===
==== 160cc career (2022–2023) ====
Irfan started competing in the MotoMini class in 2022, where he contested the 160cc class of his native MiniGP Malaysia, winning nine out of ten races and effectively taking the title. With that, he represented Malaysia in the end of the year MiniGP World Series held in Valenica, Spain and achieved a podium in the super final.

For his sophomore year in 160cc machinery, he yet again won nine out of ten races in MiniGP Malaysia, taking the title and earning the opportunity to represent Malaysia in the MiniGP World Series. He won all three races and the title, becoming the first Malaysian to win the MiniGP World Series.

==== 190cc and España Superbike career (2024–2025) ====
Irfan moved to Selangor for the 2024 season and contested a dual campaign in the FIM MiniGP Malaysia, moving up to the 190cc class, and overseas in the Moto4 class of the Spanish Superbike Championship. He won the title in the former, winning all the races in the season. In the latter, he took his first set of the podiums in the third round at Estoril, his first win came a round later in the second race at Barcelona. He collected another podium in the second race of the fifth round also held at Estoril. In the penultimate round at Navarra he took his maiden pole position in the series in the first race but retired due to a crash, he also got another podium in the second race. He ended his maiden season in fourth. He also contested the MiniGP World Series in the 190cc class for the first time and came third in the super final.

For 2025, he continued in the 190cc class of MiniGP Malaysia, taking the title after winning every race in the season. Alongside MiniGP Malaysia, he competed in the inaugural ESBK Talent category of the Spanish Superbike Championship, taking double wins in the first round at Jerez, he also started the second race on pole position. He collected two more podiums and a third win in the second round of the season at Barcelona, at Aragón he scored two more podiums and started race one from pole position. Irfan won the first race of the fourth round at Navarra, and took a double win in the penultimate round at the Estoril Circuit, sealing the championship title a round early. He got a final podium in the first race of the last round at Jerez.

He contested the 2025 FIM MiniGP World Series in the 190cc category for a final time, coming fifth and fourth in the races and seventh in the super final, he came fourth in the overall championship.

=== Moto4 ===
==== 2026 ====
Irfan contested a dual campaign in his debut year in the Moto4 Asia Cup and the Moto4 European Cup. In Moto4 Asia, he took his first podium in the second race of the opening round at Buriram. He got pole position in the following round at Sepang and claimed a double podium. Irfan missed the next two rounds in the championship after fracturing his tibia and fibula in a practice session in Moto4 Europe, on his return in the fifth round at Sepang he won the first race. In the final round at Lusail, he won race one and got on the podium in race two, he ended the championship fourth in the standings.

In Moto4 Europe, he came fourth on his debut at Barcelona, he repeated the same result in the second race of the following round at Estoril. Ifrid took his sole podium of his campaign at Jerez, with his campaign being ended early due to his double fracture sustained during practice of the fifth round.

== Personal life ==
He has been in the ZK Racing development programme, the academy of former Moto3 World Championship rider Zulfahmi Khairuddin, since 2020. His younger brother Qasha, currently competes in MiniGP Malaysia.

== Career statistics ==
=== FIM MiniGP Malaysia ===
(key) (Races in bold indicate pole position; races in italics indicate fastest lap)

Year	Bike	Class	1	2	3	4	5	6	7	8	9	10	Pos	Pts
2022	Ohvale	160cc	TAN; R1; 1	TAN; R2; 1	SIC1; R1; 5	SIC1; R2; 1	LAN; R1; 1	LAN; R2; 1	BER; R1; 1	BEF; R2; 1	SIC2; R1; 1	SIC2; R2; 1	1st	236
2023	Ohvale	160cc	TAN; R1; 1	TAN; R2; 1	SIC1; R1; 1	SIC1; R2; 1	LAN; R1; 2	LAN; R2; 1	BER; R1; 1	BEF; R2; 1	SIC2; R1; 1	SIC2; R2; 1	1st	245
2024	Ohvale	190cc	TAN; R1; 1	TAN; R2; 1	SIC1; R1; 1	SIC1; R2; 1	LAN; R1; 1	LAN; R2; 1	BER; R1; 1	BEF; R2; 1	SIC2; R1; 1	SIC2; R2; 1	1st	250
2025	Ohvale	190cc	**TAN**; **R1**; 1	**TAN**; **R2**; 1	**SIC1**; **R1**; 1	**SIC1**; **R2**; 1	**LAN**; **R1**; 1	**LAN**; **R2**; 1	**BER**; **R1**; 1	**BEF**; **R2**; 1	**SIC2**; **R1**; 1	**SIC2**; **R2**; 1	1st	250

=== FIM MiniGP World Series ===
(key) (Races in bold indicate pole position; races in italics indicate fastest lap)

Year	Class	Bike	1	2	3	Pos	Pts
2022	160cc	Ohvale	VAL; R1; 5	VAL; R2; 5	VAL; SFR; 3	4th	54
2023	160cc	Ohvale	VAL; R1; 1	VAL; R2; 1	VAL; SFR; 1	1st	100
2024	190cc	Ohvale	ARA; R1; 5	ARA; R2; 4	ARA; SFR; 3	5th	56
2025	190cc	Ohvale	VAL; R1; 4	VAL; R2; 5	VAL; SFR; 7	4th	45

=== Spanish Superbike Championship ===
==== Races by year ====
(key) (Races in bold indicate pole position; races in italics indicate fastest lap)

Year	Class	Bike	1		2		3		4		5		6		7		Pos	Pts	Ref
Year	Class	Bike	R1	R2	R1	R2	R1	R2	R1	R2	R1	R2	R1	R2	R1	R2	Pos	Pts	Ref
2024	Moto4	Corse Factory	JER; 6	JER; 12	CRT; 4	CRT; 7	EST; 3	EST; 2	BAR; 5	BAR; 1	EST; 15	EST; 2	**NAV**; Ret	NAV; 3	**JER**; 3	JER; 2	4th	181	
2025	ESBK Talent	Honda	JER; 1	**JER**; 1	BAR; 2	BAR; 1	**ARA**; 2	ARA; 2	NAV; 1	**NAV**; 4	NAV; 4	NAV; 3	EST; 1	**EST**; 1	JER; 3	JER; 4	1st	281	

=== Moto4 Asia Cup ===
==== Races by year ====
(key) (Races in bold indicate pole position, races in italics indicate fastest lap)

Year	Bike	1		2		3		4		5		6		Pos	Pts
Year	Bike	R1	R2	R1	R2	R1	R2	R1	R2	R1	R2	R1	R2	Pos	Pts
2026	Honda	BUR; 6	BUR; 2	**SEP**; 3	**SEP**; 3	MOT	MOT	MAN	MAN	SEP; 1	SEP; 5	LUS; 1	LUS; 2	4th	143

* Season still in progress.

=== Moto4 European Cup ===
==== Races by year ====
(key) (Races in bold indicate pole position; races in italics indicate fastest lap)

Year	Bike	1	2	3	4	5	6	7	8	9	10	11	Pos	Pts
2026	Honda	BAR; 4	EST1; Ret	EST2; 4	JER1; 7	JER2; 3	MAG1; 8	MAG2; 14	VAL1; WD	VAL2; WD	ARA	MIS	8th	61
