= 2026 Moto4 European Cup =

Junior Motorcycle World Championship

2026 Moto4 European Cup
Previous:	2025	Next:	2027
Support series: FIM Moto3 Junior World Championship; Moto2 European Championship; Stock European Championship

The 2026 Momoven Moto4 European Cup was the tenth season of the class, formerly known as the European Talent Cup, a motorcycle racing series organized by Dorna and sponsored by Momoven. The season began at Barcelona on 22 May, and concluded at Misano on 18 October.

Spanish rider Álvaro Lucas, riding for CFMoto Aspar Junior Team, won the championship in the final round at Misano.

== Teams and riders ==
The provisional entry list was released on 13 February 2026. All riders compete on identical 250cc Honda NSF250R motorcycles and use series-specified Pirelli tyres.

Team	No.	Rider	Status	Rounds
(Italy) AC Racing Team	2	(Italy) Leonardo Martinazzi		All
(Italy) AC Racing Team	18	(Italy) Mathias Tamburini		1–3
(Italy) AC Racing Team	27	(Colombia) Mateo Marulanda		All
(Italy) AC Racing Team	49	(Spain) Izan Rodríguez		5–6
(Italy) AC Racing Team	55	(United States) Mikey Lou Sanchez		1–6
(Italy) AC Racing Team	84	(Italy) Vincenzo di Veroli		All
(Spain) AGR Team	24	(Netherlands) Luuk de Vries	R	All
(Spain) AGR Team	88	(Japan) Hayato Chishiki	R	7
(Spain) Aipar	11	(Spain) Oliver Cantos		1
(Spain) Aipar	48	(Spain) Andrés García		1–2
(Italy) Altogo Racing Team	41	(Spain) David Peris	R	All
(United Kingdom) British Talent Team - GRYD Racing (United Kingdom) SIC - GRYD Racing	4	(Malaysia) Qabil Irfan	R	1–5
(United Kingdom) British Talent Team - GRYD Racing (United Kingdom) SIC - GRYD Racing	61	(Australia) Judd Plaisted	R	3–4
(United Kingdom) British Talent Team - GRYD Racing (United Kingdom) SIC - GRYD Racing	62	(United Kingdom) Ethan Sparks		All
(Spain) CFMoto Aspar Junior Team	46	(Spain) Álvaro Lucas		All
(Spain) CFMoto Aspar Junior Team	85	(Spain) Enzo Zaragoza	R	2–7
(France) BRS - Brechon Racing School	70	(France) Gabriel Pio		1–5, 7
(Italy) Buccimoto	47	(San Marino) Gabriel Tesini		3, 5, 7
(Italy) Buccimoto	52	(Switzerland) Davide Dotta	R	7
(Italy) Buccimoto	73	(Italy) Lorenzo Fino	R	5, 7
(Netherlands) Dubbink TT Junior Sports	13	(Netherlands) Luuk Borggreve	R	All
(Spain) ETG Racing	3	(Slovenia) Tian Krševan	R	All
(Spain) ETG Racing	11	(Spain) Oliver Cantos		2
(Spain) ETG Racing	39	(Portugal) Pedro Matos		7
(Spain) ETG Racing	49	(Spain) Izan Rodríguez		1, 3–4
(Spain) ETG Racing	60	(Spain) Iker Rodríguez		7
(Spain) ETG Racing	68	(Poland) Andrzej Kupczyński	R	5
(Germany) F. Koch Rennsport	14	(Germany) Smilla Göttlich	R	1, 4–7
(Germany) F. Koch Rennsport	93	(India) Jaden Immanuel	R	7
(Spain) Face Racing	34	(Lithuania) Rafael Budginaite	R	5–7
(Spain) Face Racing	59	(Spain) Samuel Castiblanques		1–4
(Spain) Frando Racing VHC Team	10	(Portugal) Afonso Almeida		All
(Spain) Frando Racing VHC Team	21	(Spain) David Sánchez	R	All
(Spain) Frando Racing VHC Team	23	(Spain) Ignacio Galán		All
(Spain) Frando Racing VHC Team	94	(Spain) Eneko Osorio		2–7
(Italy) Fullmoto AC Racing Junior Team	19	(Belgium) Tom Rolin	R	1–6
(Italy) Fullmoto AC Racing Junior Team	29	(Spain) Daniel Climent	R	All
(Italy) Fullmoto AC Racing Junior Team	38	(Switzerland) Alessio Arnold	R	All
(Italy) Fullmoto AC Racing Junior Team	77	(Romania) Joel Mora	R	1–3, 5–7
(Spain) Ilusion Racing	6	(Germany) Anina Urlass	R	4–5
(Spain) Ilusion Racing	8	(Bulgaria) Nikola Miroslavov		1–2, 5
(Spain) Ilusion Racing	15	(Spain) Cesc Obiol		6–7
(Spain) Ilusion Racing	16	(United Kingdom) Marco Holt		2
(Spain) Ilusion Racing	71	(Czech Republic) Roman Durdis	R	1
(Spain) Ilusion Racing	97	(Portugal) Alexandre Cabá		2–3
(France) JEG Racing (France) JEG Take Off GP	9	(France) Antoine Nativi		All
(France) JEG Racing (France) JEG Take Off GP	28	(France) Marc-Antoine Audard	R	All
(France) JEG Racing (France) JEG Take Off GP	36	(France) Evan Boxberger		All
(France) JEG Racing (France) JEG Take Off GP	90	(France) Florian François		6–7
(Japan) Honda Asia-Dream Racing Junior Team	51	(Philippines) Alfonsi Daquigan		All
(Japan) Honda Asia-Dream Racing Junior Team	56	(Japan) Kotaro Togashi	R	7
(Japan) Honda Asia-Dream Racing Junior Team	81	(Thailand) Pongkun Aeimnoi	R	5–6
(Japan) Honda Asia-Dream Racing Junior Team	98	(Thailand) Noprutpong Bunprawes	R	1–4
(Germany) Kiefer Racing	75	(Germany) Robin Siegert	R	1, 3–7
(Spain) Larresport	17	(Germany) Thias Wenzel	R	All
(Spain) Larresport	50	(Sweden) Valdemar Mellgren	R	All
(Luxembourg) Leopard Junior	5	(Italy) Kevin Cancellieri	R	1–2, 4–7
(Luxembourg) Leopard Junior	11	(Spain) Oliver Cantos		3–7
(Luxembourg) Leopard Junior	31	(Italy) Edoardo Savino		All
(Luxembourg) Leopard Junior	37	(Indonesia) Ziven Rozul	R	1–6
(Thailand) Lucky Racing	66	(Thailand) Teerin Fleming	R	7
(Germany) MASS Sports Racing by JRP Motorsport	6	(Germany) Anina Urlass	R	1, 7
(Spain) Mir Racing Aspar Cup Team	30	(Spain) Miguel Roig	R	5
(Italy) MTA Junior Team	12	(Poland) Sebastian Ferrucci	R	All
(Italy) MTA Junior Team	69	(Australia) Archie Schmidt	R	1–5, 7
(France) Overtrack Racing	32	(France) Matteo Berger	R	4–5
(Italy) RC113 Reparto Corse	42	(Italy) Mattia Rutigliano	R	1–5, 7
(Italy) SM Corse - Gea Motorsport	45	(Italy) Matteo Agostino	R	7
(Italy) SM Corse - Gea Motorsport	72	(Poland) Julia Jantarska	R	7
(Italy) SM Corse - Gea Motorsport	99	(Italy) Matteo Masili	R	7
(Italy) Snipers Igax Team	20	(Germany) Fynn Kratochwil		All
(Italy) Snipers Igax Team	22	(Spain) Jonathan Ramila	R	All
(Italy) Snipers Igax Team	96	(Spain) Álex Debón	R	All
(Italy) Team Echovit Pasini Racing	7	(Italy) Cristian Borrelli		All
(Italy) Team Echovit Pasini Racing	40	(Italy) Leonardo Casadei	R	All
(Italy) Team Echovit Pasini Racing	67	(Italy) Lorenzo Pritelli		All
(Spain) Team Honda Laglisse	26	(Spain) José Reyes	R	All
(Spain) Team Honda Laglisse	49	(Spain) Izan Rodríguez		7
(Spain) Team Honda Laglisse	60	(Spain) Iker Rodríguez		1–6
(Spain) Team Honda Laglisse	83	(Spain) Nicolás Jiménez	R	All
(Spain) Team Impala Honda	53	(Spain) Víctor Cubeles		All
(Spain) Team Impala Honda	89	(Spain) Eric Ruz		All
(Spain) Team Monlau Motul	15	(Spain) Cesc Obiol	R	1–2
(Spain) Team Monlau Motul	25	(France) Nolann Macary	R	2–7
(Spain) Team Monlau Motul	91	(Spain) Leonardo Cabrera	R	3–5
(Italy) WE Race - Pos Corse	43	(Italy) Luca Rizzi	R	7
(Italy) WE Race - Pos Corse	64	(Italy) Alessio Paglioni	R	7

Icon	Status
R	Rookie

== Calendar ==
The provisional calendar was released on 18 September 2025.

Round	Circuit	Date	Map of circuit locations
1	(Spain) Circuit de Barcelona, Montmeló	22–24 May	2026 Moto4 European Cup is located in Europe
2	(Portugal) Circuito do Estoril, Alcabideche	12–14 June	2026 Moto4 European Cup is located in Europe
3	(Spain) Circuito de Jerez, Jerez de la Frontera	3–5 July	2026 Moto4 European Cup is located in Europe
4	(France) Circuit de Nevers Magny-Cours, Magny-Cours	24–26 July	2026 Moto4 European Cup is located in Europe
5	(Spain) Circuit Ricardo Tormo, Cheste	4–6 September	2026 Moto4 European Cup is located in Europe
6	(Spain) MotorLand Aragón, Alcañiz	25–27 September	2026 Moto4 European Cup is located in Europe
7	(Italy) Misano World Circuit, Misano Adriatico	16–18 October	2026 Moto4 European Cup is located in Europe

== Race results ==
Round		Circuit	Pole position	Fastest lap	Winning rider	Winning team
1	R1	(Spain) Barcelona	(Italy) Lorenzo Pritelli	(Spain) Álvaro Lucas	(Spain) Álvaro Lucas	(Spain) CFMoto Aspar Junior Team
2	R1	(Portugal) Estoril	(Spain) Álvaro Lucas	(Malaysia) Qabil Irfan	(Spain) Álvaro Lucas	(Spain) CFMoto Aspar Junior Team
2	R2	(Portugal) Estoril	(Spain) Álvaro Lucas	(Spain) Victor Cubeles	(Spain) Álvaro Lucas	(Spain) CFMoto Aspar Junior Team
3	R1	(Spain) Jerez	(Italy) Cristian Borrelli	(Italy) Edoardo Savino	(Italy) Lorenzo Pritelli	(Italy) Team Echovit Pasini Racing
3	R2	(Spain) Jerez	(Italy) Cristian Borrelli	(Germany) Fynn Kratochwil	(Colombia) Mateo Marulanda	(Italy) AC Racing Team
4	R1	(France) Magny-Cours	(Italy) Lorenzo Pritelli	(Italy) Edoardo Savino	(Spain) Victor Cubeles	(Spain) Team Impala Honda
4	R2	(France) Magny-Cours	(Italy) Lorenzo Pritelli	(Italy) Lorenzo Pritelli	(Italy) Lorenzo Pritelli	(Italy) Team Echovit Pasini Racing
5	R1	(Spain) Valencia	(Spain) Víctor Cubeles	(Poland) Andrzej Kupczyński	(Spain) Álvaro Lucas	(Spain) CFMoto Aspar Junior Team
5	R2	(Spain) Valencia	(Spain) Víctor Cubeles	(Spain) Ignacio Galán	(Italy) Lorenzo Pritelli	(Italy) Team Echovit Pasini Racing
6	R1	(Spain) Aragón	(Italy) Lorenzo Pritelli	(Colombia) Mateo Marulanda	(Italy) Lorenzo Pritelli	(Italy) Team Echovit Pasini Racing
7	R1	(Italy) Misano	(Italy) Cristian Borrelli	(Italy) Lorenzo Pritelli	(Italy) Lorenzo Pritelli	(Italy) Team Echovit Pasini Racing

== Championship standings ==
Scoring system
Points are awarded to the top fifteen finishers. A rider has to finish the race to earn points.

Position	1st	2nd	3rd	4th	5th	6th	7th	8th	9th	10th	11th	12th	13th	14th	15th
Points	25	20	16	13	11	10	9	8	7	6	5	4	3	2	1

=== Riders' championship ===
Pos.	Rider	CAT (Spain)	EST (Portugal)		JER (Spain)		MAG (France)		VAL (Spain)		ARA (Spain)	MIS (Italy)	Points
1	(Spain) Álvaro Lucas	1^{F}	1^{P}	1^{P}	2	Ret	2	2	1	3	5	7	196
2	(Italy) Lorenzo Pritelli	3^{P}	Ret	2	1	Ret	4^{P}	1^{P F}	3	1	1^{P}	1^{F}	190
3	(Spain) Víctor Cubeles	9	6	3^{F}	5	Ret	1	3	10^{P}	5^{P}	4	3	131
4	(Colombia) Mateo Marulanda	8	4	Ret	4	1	3	5	6	Ret	2^{F}	4	129
5	(Italy) Edoardo Savino	2	2	20	3^{F}	Ret	5^{F}	4	Ret	2	3	5	127
6	(Germany) Fynn Kratochwil	Ret	10	9	8	5^{F}	6	6	2	4	13	13	91
7	(Spain) Ignacio Galán	13	7	5	6	2	11	22	9	8^{F}	8	21	81
8	(Malaysia) Qabil Irfan	4	Ret^{F}	4	7	3	8	14	WD	WD			61
9	(Italy) Leonardo Casadei	7	15	Ret	11	6	18	16	4	10	6	Ret	54
10	(Italy) Cristian Borrelli	5	5	8	Ret^{P}	Ret^{P}	Ret	7	Ret	DNS	7	Ret^{P}	48
11	(Spain) Eneko Osorio		12	Ret	12	4	12	9	Ret	15	9	9	47
12	(Spain) Jonathan Ramila	12	9	11	10	9	19	10	8	Ret	22	22	43
13	(Spain) Enzo Zaragoza		13	15	Ret	17	9	8	5	6	WD	26	40
14	(Philippines) Alfonsi Daquigan	14	3	Ret	17	8	13	17	Ret	Ret	26	6	39
15	(United Kingdom) Ethan Sparks	15	20	6	9	Ret	16	19	Ret	Ret	19	2	38
16	(Switzerland) Alessio Arnold	Ret	8	7	Ret	11	21	24	13	16	21	10	31
17	(France) Evan Boxberger	6	Ret	17	18	7	20	13	16	14	15	17	25
18	(United States) Mikey Lou Sanchez	Ret	14	10	20	15	10	12	11	Ret	23		24
19	(Spain) David Sánchez	11	Ret	13	Ret	13	DNQ	DNQ	15	11	16	Ret	17
20	(Spain) Izan Rodríguez	16			DNQ	DNQ	7	15	DNQ	22	12	DNQ	14
21	(France) Antoine Nativi	Ret	18	19	15	10	14	11	DNQ	DNQ	17	Ret	14
22	(Spain) Álex Debón	DNQ	24	21	DNQ	DNQ	22	26	7	12	28	16	13
23	(Portugal) Afonso Almeida	10	Ret	12	14	Ret	WD	WD	DNQ	21	18	15	13
24	(Lithuania) Rafael Budginaite								Ret	9	11	DNQ	12
25	(Italy) Leonardo Martinazzi	DNQ	23	24	21	14	25	20	DNQ	DNQ	27	8	10
26	(Spain) Eric Ruz	17	19	16	16	Ret	23	27	12	Ret	10	DNQ	10
27	(Spain) Oliver Cantos	DNQ	Ret	25	23	18	17	Ret	14	13	20	11	10
28	(Poland) Andrzej Kupczyński								Ret^{F}	7			9
29	(Spain) David Peris	WD	11	Ret	DNQ	DNQ	24	Ret	DNQ	DNQ	DNQ	DNQ	5
30	(Japan) Kotaro Togashi											12	4
31	(Spain) Samuel Castiblanques	DNQ	21	18	19	12	Ret	21					4
32	(Italy) Vincenzo di Veroli	24	DNQ	DNQ	Ret	16	Ret	Ret	DNQ	DNQ	14	14	4
33	(San Marino) Gabriel Tesini				13	Ret			Ret	21		23	3
34	(Italy) Mathias Tamburini	21	16	14	DNQ	DNQ							2
35	(Spain) José Reyes	DNQ	17	22	DNQ	DNQ	15	23	Ret	DNS	24	DNQ	1
36	(Spain) Miguel Roig								17	Ret			0
37	(Australia) Archie Schmidt	DNQ	22	23	22	19	DNQ	DNQ	18	17		DNQ	0
38	(France) Nolann Macary		DNQ	DNQ	25	20	26	18	DNS	18	DNQ	DNQ	0
39	(Italy) Kevin Cancellieri	18	WD	WD			DNQ	DNQ	DNQ	DNQ	DNQ	DNQ	0
40	(Spain) Daniel Climent	DNQ	DNQ	DNQ	DNQ	DNQ	DNQ	DNQ	19	20	Ret	18	0
41	(Thailand) Noprutpong Bunprawes	19	DNQ	DNQ	DNQ	DNQ	DNQ	DNQ					0
42	(Switzerland) Davide Dotta											19	0
43	(Italy) Lorenzo Fino								20	23		24	0
44	(Italy) Luca Rizzi											20	0
45	(Netherlands) Luuk de Vries	20	DNQ	DNQ	DNQ	DNQ	DNQ	DNQ	DNQ	DNQ	DNQ	DNQ	0
46	(Belgium) Tom Rolin	22	DNQ	DNQ	Ret	Ret	DNQ	DNQ	DNQ	DNQ	DNQ		0
47	(Poland) Sebastian Ferrucci	23	DNQ	DNQ	DNQ	DNQ	DNQ	DNQ	DNQ	DNQ	DNQ	DNQ	0
48	(Spain) Cesc Obiol	DNQ	DNQ	DNQ							29	25	0
49	(Spain) Iker Rodríguez	Ret	DNQ	DNQ	DNQ	DNQ	Ret	25	DNQ	DNQ	DNQ	DNQ	0
50	(Indonesia) Ziven Rozul	DNQ	DNQ	DNQ	DNQ	DNQ	DNQ	DNQ	DNQ	DNQ	25		0
	(Germany) Thias Wenzel	Ret	WD	WD	DNQ	DNQ	DNQ	DNQ	DNQ	DNQ	DNQ	DNQ	0
	(France) Marc-Antoine Audard	DNQ	DNQ	DNQ	DNQ	DNQ	DNQ	DNQ	DNQ	DNQ	DNQ	DNQ	
	(Slovenia) Tian Krševan	DNQ	DNQ	DNQ	DNQ	DNQ	DNQ	DNQ	DNQ	DNQ	DNQ	DNQ	
	(Sweden) Valdemar Mellgren	DNQ	DNQ	DNQ	DNQ	DNQ	DNQ	DNQ	DNQ	DNQ	DNQ	DNQ	
	(Netherlands) Luuk Borggreve	DNQ	DNQ	DNQ	DNQ	DNQ	DNQ	DNQ	DNQ	DNQ	DNQ	DNPQ	
	(Spain) Nicolás Jiménez	DNQ	DNQ	DNQ	DNQ	DNQ	DNQ	DNQ	DNQ	DNQ	DNQ	DNPQ	
	(Italy) Mattia Rutigliano	DNQ	DNQ	DNQ	DNQ	DNQ	DNQ	DNQ	DNQ	DNQ		DNQ	
	(France) Gabriel Pio	DNQ	DNQ	DNQ	DNQ	DNQ	DNQ	DNQ	DNQ	DNQ		DNQ	
	(Romania) Joel Mora	DNQ	DNQ	DNQ	DNQ	DNQ			DNQ	DNQ	DNQ	DNQ	
	(Germany) Robin Siegert	DNQ			DNQ	DNQ	WD	WD	DNQ	DNQ	DNQ	DNQ	
	(Germany) Smilla Göttlich	DNQ					DNQ	DNQ	DNQ	DNQ	DNQ	DNQ	
	(Germany) Anina Urlass	DNQ					DNQ	DNQ	DNQ	DNQ		DNPQ	
	(Bulgaria) Nikola Miroslavov	DNQ	DNQ	DNQ					DNQ	DNQ	DNQ		
	(Spain) Leonardo Cabrera				DNQ	DNQ	DNQ	DNQ	DNQ	DNQ			
	(Portugal) Alexandre Cabá		DNQ	DNQ	DNQ	DNQ							
	(Australia) Judd Plaisted				DNQ	DNQ	DNQ	DNQ					
	(France) Matteo Berger						DNQ	DNQ	DNQ	DNQ			
	(Spain) Andrés García	DNQ	DNQ	DNQ									
	(Thailand) Pongkun Aeimnoi								DNQ	DNQ	WD		
	(France) Florian François										DNQ	DNQ	
	(United Kingdom) Marco Holt		DNQ	DNQ									
	(Czech Republic) Roman Durdis	DNQ											
	(Italy) Alessio Paglioni											DNQ	
	(Japan) Hayato Chishiki											DNQ	
	(Poland) Julia Jantarska											DNQ	
	(Italy) Matteo Agostino											DNQ	
	(Italy) Matteo Masili											DNQ	
	(Portugal) Pedro Matos											DNQ	
	(Thailand) Teerin Fleming											DNQ	
	(India) Jaden Immanuel											DNPQ	
Pos.	Rider	CAT (Spain)	EST (Portugal)		JER (Spain)		MAG (France)		VAL (Spain)		ARA (Spain)	MIS (Italy)	Points

Colour	Result
Gold	Winner
Silver	Second place
Bronze	Third place
Green	Points classification
Blue	Non-points classification
Blue	Non-classified finish (NC)
Purple	Retired, not classified (Ret)
Red	Did not qualify (DNQ)
Red	Did not pre-qualify (DNPQ)
Black	Disqualified (DSQ)
White	Did not start (DNS)
White	Withdrew (WD)
White	Race cancelled (C)
Blank	Did not practice (DNP)
Blank	Did not arrive (DNA)
Blank	Excluded (EX)

P – Pole position
F – Fastest lap
