= Kairi Moriyama =

Japanese motorcycle racer (born 2009)

Kairi Moriyama 森山 浬
- Born: 11 August 2009 (age 17); Nerima, Tokyo, Japan
- Nationality: Japanese
- Current team: Webike Team Norick
- Bike number: 27

Championship titles
- All Japan JP250 (2024)
Statistics
All Japan ST600
Active years	2026–
Championships	0
Manufacturer	Yamaha
Last season (2026)	18th (19 pts)
Starts / Wins / Podiums / Poles / F. laps / Points; 5 / 0 / 0 / 0 / 0 / 19
All Japan JP250
Active years	2024–2025
Championships	1 (2024) (Note: National class.)
Manufacturer	Yamaha
Starts / Wins / Podiums / Poles / F. laps / Points; 6 / 1 / 5 / 0 / 0 / 107

Kairi Moriyama (Japanese: 森山 浬, Hepburn: Moriyama Kairi; born 11 August 2009) is a Japanese motorcycle racer who competes in the ST600 class of the All Japan Road Race Championship for Webike Team Norick.

Moriyama won the National class title of the JP250 2024 All Japan Road Race Championship.

== Career ==
=== Early career ===
Born in the Nerima ward of Tokyo, Moriyama began riding pocketbikes at the age of six, before entering his first race aged seven. In 2019, he competed in the 74Daijiro class of the Daijiro Cup, where he clinched a second place finish at the final round in Akigase, behind Seiryu Ikegami. That same year, he also competed on a bigger bike aboard the Honda NSF100 in the Kanto Road Mini Championship, where he ranked third.

==== FIM MiniGP (2022) ====
In 2022, Moriyama was selected to compete in the newly established FIM MiniGP Japan. He rode a 160cc four-stroke minibike, and his best result was a fourth place at Okegawa. His final ranking position was seventh.

=== All Japan Road Race Championship ===
==== JP250 (2024–2025) ====
Moriyama stepped up to full size road racing in 2024, after signing with Team Norick for the All Japan Road Race Championship, competing in the domestic class of the JP250 category. Aboard a modified Yamaha YZF-R3, he scored three podiums in the first three races at Motegi, Sugo and Tsukuba, before clinching his maiden win at Okayama. Moriyama would ultimately finish the final race at Suzuka in third place, and became the JP250 National class champion in his rookie season.

That same year, he also competed in regional championships such as the Tsukuba and Motegi Road Race Championships, with the same JP250 equipment, and clinched several victories. Additionally, he also participated in a Japanese rider development program organized by Yamaha, using the same R3 from the All Japan.

In 2025, Moriyama returned to the JP250 class, racing in the same National license class, where he scored three consecutive second places at Sugo, Tsukuba and Motegi. He finished fourth in the domestic rankings after missing one round and retiring out of another one.

==== ST600 (2025–) ====
At the same time as he completed his second year racing the Yamaha YZF-R3, Moriyama stepped up to the bigger inline-four Yamaha YZF-R6. He competed in the Tsukuba and Motegi Road Race Championships, where he won most of the races, and claimed the title of the latter.

Following his success riding the R6 in his 2025 campaign, Moriyama entered the 2026 All Japan Road Race Championship in the ST600 class, backed up by the same Team Norick crew. He finished in 12th place in his debut race at Sugo, and followed with a 13th place in Race 2.

== Career statistics ==
=== FIM MiniGP Japan ===
(key) (Races in bold indicate pole position; races in italics indicate fastest lap)

Year	Bike	1	2	3	4	5	6	7	8	9	10	Pos	Pts
2022	Ohvale	TSU; R1; 7	TSU; R2; 7	MOT; R1; 9	MOT; R2; 7	MOT; R1; 8	MOT; R2; 8	OKE; R1; 7	OKE; R2; 4	TSU; R1; 12	TSU; R2; 11	7th	64

=== Tsukuba Road Race Championship ===
==== Races by year ====
(key) (Races in bold indicate pole position; races in italics indicate fastest lap. Superscript numbers indicate overall results, including both national and international classes.)

Year	Class	Bike	1	2	3	4	Pos	Pts
2024	JP250	Yamaha	TSU1; Ret	**TSU2**; 1^{1}	**TSU3**; 1^{1}	TSU4	3rd	50
2025	ST600	Yamaha	**TSU1**; 1^{1}	**TSU2**; 1^{1}	**TSU3**; 1^{1}	TSU4	2nd	75

=== Motegi Road Race Championship ===
==== Races by year ====
(key) (Races in bold indicate pole position; races in italics indicate fastest lap. Superscript numbers indicate overall results, including both national and international classes.)

Year	Class	Bike	1	2	3	4	Pos	Pts
2024	JP250	Yamaha	MOT1; 6^{9}	**MOT2**; 1^{1}	MOT3	MOT4	3rd	35
2025	ST600	Yamaha	MOT1; 1^{3}	MOT2; 1^{5}	MOT3; 3^{10}	**MOT4**; 1^{1}	1st	91

=== Suzuka Sunday Road Race ===
==== Races by year ====
(key) (Races in bold indicate pole position; races in italics indicate fastest lap. Superscript numbers indicate overall results, including both national and international classes.)

Year	Class	Bike	1	2	3	4	Pos	Pts
2025	ST600	Yamaha	SUZ1	SUZ2; Ret	SUZ3	SUZ4; Ret	NC	0

=== All Japan Road Race Championship ===
==== Races by year ====
(key) (Races in bold indicate pole position; races in italics indicate fastest lap. Superscript numbers indicate overall results, including both national and international classes.)

Year	Class	Bike	1	2	3	4	5	6	Pos	Pts
2024	JP250	Yamaha	MOT; 3^{10}	SUG; 2^{6}	TSU; 2^{6}	AUT; 6^{12}	OKA; 1^{4}	SUZ; 3^{11}	1st	107
2025	JP250	Yamaha	SUG; 2^{4}	TSU; 2^{9}	MOT; 2^{4}	AUT; DNS	OKA; Ret	SUZ; 5^{9}	4th	71
2026	ST600	Yamaha	SUG1; 12	SUG2; 13	AUT; 13	MOT; Ret	OKA; WD	SUZ; 10	18th	19
