= Waku Kunitate =

Japanese motorcycle racer (born 2012)

Waku Kunitate 国立 和玖
- Born: 8 January 2012 (age 14); Nisshin, Aichi, Japan
- Nationality: Japanese
- Bike number: 8
Statistics
Moto4 Asia Cup
Active years	2026–
Championships	0
Manufacturer	Honda
Starts / Wins / Podiums / Poles / F. laps / Points; 12 / 0 / 5 / 0 / 0 / 148
All Japan J-GP3
Active years	2025
Championships	0
Manufacturer	Honda
Team(s)	MotoUp Racing
Last season (2025)	NC (Note: Competed under a Special Participation license which is ineligible for points.)
Starts / Wins / Podiums / Poles / F. laps / Points; 7 / 0 / 0 / 0 / 0 / -

Waku Kunitate (Japanese: 国立 和玖, Hepburn: Kunitate Waku; born 8 January 2012) is a Japanese motorcycle racer who competes in the Moto4 Asia Cup. He is the 2024 FIM MiniGP World Series champion of the 160cc class.

Kunitate has competed in the All Japan Road Race Championship's J-GP3 class in 2025 and 2026. He is part of Tetsuta Nagashima's rider development program TN45.

== Career ==
=== Early career ===
Kunitate was born in Nisshin, Japan. At the age of two, he started riding strider bikes and spent the following three years competing in strider championships—both in Japan and internationally. He won his first championship in the Strider Cup World Championship in 2015, which took place in the United States.

=== FIM MiniGP (2022–2024) ===
Kunitate entered the newly established FIM MiniGP Japan in early 2022, at the age of ten. He finished on the podium in the majority of the races and claimed his maiden win in the final round at Tsukuba—winning both races at the event. He placed third in the final standings. Kunitate faced his second MiniGP season in 2023, and clinched seven podiums in a row including two wins at Tsukuba. He finished the season in second place behind rookie Kotaro Togashi—which granted him a spot in the World Series Final at Valencia. Him and Togashi represented Japan in the 160cc class aboard Ohvale GP-0 machines. Kunitate finished 12th overall with his best result being a seventh place in Race 1.

In 2024, Kunitate would enter his third and final season in MiniGP. He stayed consistent throughout the season, scoring podiums in all but one race out of ten. He won three races and finished in second place overall again, this time behind Hayato Chishiki. This result meant he would compete in the World Series and represent Japan for a second year—this time held at MotorLand Aragón. In his second stint in the MiniGP World Final, Kunitate claimed the 160cc class title after winning two of the three races.

=== All Japan Road Race Championship (2025–) ===
==== J-GP3 ====
Kunitate entered the 2025 All Japan Road Race Championship with the Tetsuta Nagashima backed MotoUP Jr Team in the J-GP3 class—with Hayato Chishiki as teammate. He finished within the points section in the second round at Tsukuba, after finishing in 13th place. His best result was a tenth place at Okayama and finished as the third best Special Participation rider, behind Chishiki and Kotaro Togashi. In 2026, Kunitate enetered the Motegi round of the J-GP3 class as a wildcard under a Special Participation license, with Nagashima's TN45 team, and crossed the finish line in seventh place.

=== Moto4 Asia Cup (2026–) ===
Kunitate was invited to the 2026 Moto4 Asia Cup selection event at Sepang in October 2025, where he was selected to compete full-time in 2026. In the opening race at Buriram, Kunitate finished in second place, only 0.017 seconds behind Hayato Chishiki after a final lap battle, which was followed by a fourth place in Race 2. Kunitate secured three podiums in the following four races at Sepang and Motegi. At the latter, he crossed the finish line first but was demoted for exceeding track limits. Arriving at the penultimate round at Sepang, Kunitate sat in second place in the standings, 23 points behind championship leader Chishiki. However, he lost several points following a last lap crash in Race 2, and headed into the final round in third place, 40 points behind leader Chishiki.

== Career statistics ==
=== FIM MiniGP Japan ===
(key) (Races in bold indicate pole position; races in italics indicate fastest lap)

Year	Bike	1	2	3	4	5	6	7	8	9	10	Pos	Pts
2022	Ohvale	TSU; R1; 2	TSU; R2; 2	MOT; R1; Ret	MOT; R2; DNS	MOT; R1; 2	MOT; R2; 3	OKE; R1; 2	OKE; R2; 15	**TSU**; **R1**; 1	**TSU**; **R2**; 1	3rd	123
2023	Ohvale	OKE; R1; 3	OKE; R2; 2	MOT; R1; 3	MOT; R2; 3	**TSU**; **R1**; 1	**TSU**; **R2**; 1	**SUZ**; **R1**; 2	**SUZ**; **R2**; 12	OKE; R1; 3	OKE; R2; 3	2nd	150
2024	Ohvale	TSU; R1; 2	**TSU**; **R2**; 2	OKE; R1; 2	OKE; R2; 2	**TSU**; **R1**; 4	**TSU**; **R2**; 1	**KIN**; **R1**; 1	KIN; R2; 1	OKE; R1; 2	OKE; R2; 2	2nd	175

=== FIM MiniGP World Series ===
(key) (Races in bold indicate pole position; races in italics indicate fastest lap)

Year	Class	Bike	1	2	3	Pos	Pts
2023	160cc	Ohvale	VAL; R1; 7	VAL; R2; 19	VAL; SFR; 12	12th	17
2024	160cc	Ohvale	ARA; R1; 1	ARA; R2; 1	ARA; SFR; 4	1st	76

=== Tsukuba Road Race Championship ===
==== Races by year ====
(key) (Races in bold indicate pole position; races in italics indicate fastest lap. Superscript numbers indicate overall results, including both national and international classes.)

Year	Class	Bike	1	2	3	4	Pos	Pts
2024	J-GP3 (Note: National class.)	Honda	TSU1	TSU2	TSU3	TSU4; 4^{4}	11th	13

=== All Japan Road Race Championship ===
==== Races by year ====
(key) (Races in bold indicate pole position; races in italics indicate fastest lap)

Year	Class	Bike	1	2	3	4	5	6	7	Pos	Pts
2025	J-GP3	Honda	SUG; 20†	TSU1; 13	TSU2; 16	MOT; 16	AUT; 14	OKA; 10	SUZ; 12	NC	-
2026	J-GP3	Honda	SUG	AUT	TSU	MOT; 7	OKA	SUZ		NC	-

- † – Rider did not finish the race, but was classified as he completed more than 75% of the race distance.

=== Moto4 Asia Cup ===
==== Races by year ====
(key) (Races in bold indicate pole position, races in italics indicate fastest lap)

Year	Bike	1		2		3		4		5		6		Pos	Pts
Year	Bike	R1	R2	R1	R2	R1	R2	R1	R2	R1	R2	R1	R2	Pos	Pts
2026	Honda	BUR; 2	BUR; 4	SEP; 5	SEP; 2	MOT; 3	MOT; 2	MAN; 6	MAN; Ret	SEP; 5	SEP; Ret	LUS; 3	LUS; 5	3rd	148
