= Fynn Kratochwil =

German motorcycle racer (born 2010)

- Born: 12 August 2010 (age 16); Mühlhausen, Germany
- Nationality: German
- Current team: Snipers Igax Team
- Bike number: 20
Statistics
Moto4 European Cup
Active years	2024–
Championships	0
Manufacturer	Honda
Last season (2026)	6th (91 pts)
Starts / Wins / Podiums / Poles / F. laps / Points; 20 / 0 / 1 / 0 / 2 / 146

Fynn Kratochwil (born 12 August 2010) is a German motorcycle racer who competes in the Moto4 European Cup and the Red Bull MotoGP Rookies Cup. He is the 2025 Northern Talent Cup champion.

== Career ==
=== Early career ===
Born in Mühlhausen, Kratochwil began racing pocket bikes at a young age and won his first championship in the ADAC in 2019. He later stepped up to the Honda NSF100 on which he won the ADAC Einsteiger and Nachwuchs championships in 2020 and 2021, respectively.

=== MiniGP (2022–2024) ===
In 2022, Kratochwil joined the FIM MiniGP Austria championship, where he became champion in the final round with a double victory at the Red Bull Ring. This achievement granted him a spot in the MiniGP World Series final at Valencia, Spain—representing Germany in the 160cc class. He clinched podium finishes in all three races, and ranked second in the final standings. In 2023, Kratochwil moved to FIM MiniGP Germany, where he was champion too, and got to compete in the World Series for a second time. This time around, his best result was a fifth in the final race and ranked sixth overall.

Kratochwil stepped up to the higher displacement Ohvale 190 in the same German MiniGP championship for the 2024 season. He was crowned champion for a second time and got his third World Series participation, first in the 190cc class. However, he suffered an accident during qualifying which kept him from competing in the races.

=== Northern Talent Cup (2024–2025) ===
In August 2024, Kratochwil made his first Northern Talent Cup entry as a wildcard at Assen. Aboard the bigger Honda NSF250R, he finished eighth in his debut race, and made it to the podium in Race 2 with a third place. The following year, he entered the 2025 Northern Talent Cup season as a full-time rider, where he dominated the championship, winning every race of the calendar except two—and fending off title rivals Robin Siegert and Thias Wenzel.

=== Moto4 European Cup (2024–) ===
In October 2024, Kratochwil entered the European Talent Cup's MotorLand Aragón round as wildcard, racing for Intact GP. He made it through the qualifying sessions and got his first point in his debut race. He was set to participate in his second European Talent Cup round at Estoril but an injury sustained at the FIM MiniGP World Series forced him to sit it out.

In 2025, Kratochwil entered his first full-time season in the series, racing for Emilio Alzamora's Seventytwo Artbox Racing Team. He clinched several top ten finishes in his rookie season, with a best result of fifth in the opening round at Estoril. He finished in 10th place overall. Kratochwil entered his second full time European Talent Cup season in 2026, with the class having been rebranded as the Moto4 European Cup. Racing for Snipers Igax Team, he clinched his maiden podium in the class at Valencia, following a second place finish.

=== Red Bull MotoGP Rookies Cup (2026–) ===
Following his 2025 Northern Talent Cup title, Kratochwil was selected to compete in the 2026 Red Bull MotoGP Rookies Cup season. In his rookie year, he clinched his maiden podium at Mugello, which was converted into a double podium after Race 2. He also set pole position during his home round at Sachsenring, where he finished third in Race 2. Kratochwil would clinch three more podiums throughout Misano and Spielberg, and ranked fifth overall in the final standings—with a total of six podiums in his debut year.

== Career statistics ==
=== FIM MiniGP World Series ===
(key) (Races in bold indicate pole position; races in italics indicate fastest lap)

Year	Class	Bike	1	2	3	Pos	Pts
2022	160cc	Ohvale	VAL; R1; 2	VAL; R2; 3	VAL; SFR; 2	2nd	76
2023	160cc	Ohvale	VAL; R1; 8	VAL; R2; 6	VAL; SFR; 5	6th	40
2024	190cc	Ohvale	ARA; R1; DNS	ARA; R2; DNS	ARA; SFR; DNS	NC	0

=== Northern Talent Cup ===
==== Races by year ====
(key) (Races in bold indicate pole position; races in italics indicate fastest lap)

Year	Bike	1		2		3		4		5		6		7		Pos	Pts
Year	Bike	R1	R2	R1	R2	R1	R2	R1	R2	R1	R2	R1	R2	R1	R2	Pos	Pts
2024	Honda	ASS	ASS	SAC	SAC	OSC	OSC	MOS	MOS	SAC	SAC	ASS; 8	ASS; 3	NUE	NUE	19th	24
2025	Honda	**ASS**; 1	**ASS**; 1	OSC; 1	OSC; Ret	**MOS**; 1	MOS; 1	**SAC**; 1	**SAC**; 3	BRN; 1	BRN; 1	**NUE**; 1	**NUE**; 1	ASS; 1	ASS; 1	1st	316

=== Moto4 European Cup ===
==== Races by year ====
(key) (Races in bold indicate pole position; races in italics indicate fastest lap)

Year	Bike	1	2	3	4	5	6	7	8	9	10	11	Pos	Pts
2024	Honda	MIS1	MIS2	EST1	EST2	BAR	ALG	JER1	JER2	ARA1; 15	ARA2; 19	EST	32nd	1
2025	Honda	EST1; 8	EST2; 5	JER1; DNQ	JER2; DNQ	MAG1; 7	MAG2; 20	ARA; 8	MIS1	MIS2	BAR; 6	VAL; 8	10th	54
2026	Honda	BAR; Ret	EST1; 10	EST2; 9	JER1; 8	JER2; 5	MAG1; 6	MAG2; 6	VAL1; 2	VAL2; 4	ARA; 13	MIS; 13	6th	91

=== Red Bull MotoGP Rookies Cup ===
==== Races by year ====
(key) (Races in bold indicate pole position; races in italics indicate fastest lap)

Year	Bike	1		2		3		4		5		6		7		Pos	Pts
Year	Bike	R1	R2	R1	R2	R1	R2	R1	R2	R1	R2	R1	R2	R1	R2	Pos	Pts
2026	KTM	JER; 8	JER; 12	LMS; Ret	LMS; 12	MUG; 3	MUG; 2	ASS; 17	ASS; Ret	**SAC**; 4	**SAC**; 3	MIS; 5	MIS; 3	RBR; 3	RBR; 2	5th	144
