= Kotaro Togashi =

Japanese motorcycle racer (born 2011)

Kotaro Togashi 富樫 虎太郎
- Born: 4 October 2011 (age 15); Ōizumi, Gunma, Japan
- Nationality: Japanese
- Current team: SDG Jr. 56Racing
- Bike number: 56
Statistics
Moto4 Asia Cup
Active years	2026–
Championships	0
Manufacturer	Honda
Starts / Wins / Podiums / Poles / F. laps / Points; 12 / 2 / 4 / 2 / 2 / 135
All Japan J-GP3
Active years	2024–
Championships	0
Manufacturer	Honda
Last season (2026)	3rd (66 pts)
Starts / Wins / Podiums / Poles / F. laps / Points; 12 / 0 / 2 / 0 / 0 / 66

Kotaro Togashi (Japanese: 富樫 虎太郎, Hepburn: Togashi Kotarō; born 4 October 2011) is a Japanese motorcycle racer who competes in the Moto4 Asia Cup and the J-GP3 class of the All Japan Road Race Championship. He is the 2023 FIM MiniGP World Series runner-up of the 160cc class.

Togashi is mentored by Shinya Nakano and has been part of his development program 56Racing since 2022.

== Career ==
=== Early career ===
Togashi was born in Ōizumi, Japan. He began riding minibikes at the age of three and started to compete in his first year of elementary school. In 2018 he debuted in the Kids-E class of the Kanto Road Mini Championship at Okegawa Sports Land. Between 2019 and 2020, Togashi won several races of the Riding Sport Cup at the Shiraito Circuit in Fujinomiya.

In 2021, Togashi won the HRC Trophy Junior class championship in the Kanto Road Mini Championship at Okegawa Sports Land. In February 2022 he was announced as the new addition to Shinya Nakano's rider development program—set to race in the Kanto Road Mini Championship's top class aboard a Honda NSF100. He was crowned champion of the category by the fifth round, winning the majority of the races.

=== FIM MiniGP (2023) ===
In 2023, Togashi entered Japan's FIM MiniGP championship. He won the first four races at Okegawa and Motegi, which were followed by two podiums at Tsukuba. He would go on to win the remaining four races at Suzuka and Okegawa, which crowned him champion and granted him a spot in the World Series Final at Valencia. Him and championship runner-up Waku Kunitate competed in the 160cc class, aboard the same Ohvale 160cc used in the Japan feeder. Togashi qualified for the three races and finished third in the opening race. He neared the top spot in the remaining two races and ultimately finished in second place in both—granting him the runner-up spot of the 160cc class in the overall standings.

=== All Japan Road Race Championship (2024–) ===
==== J-GP3 ====
After his success on minibikes, Togashi stepped up to the bigger Honda NSF250R in 2024, and competed in the J-GP3 class of the Tsukuba Road Race Championship and Suzuka Sunday Road Race. He won the Tsukuba Championship and was given a wildcard entry slot for the final round of the 2024 All Japan Road Race Championship—in the J-GP3 class at Suzuka. Togashi finished in the points in 13th place, scoring three points in his All Japan debut. In December 2024, it was announced he would be racing full-time in the J-GP3 class with SDG Jr. 56Racing for the 2025 season—under a Special Participation license.

Togashi started off the season with a crash followed by a retirement at Sugo, after qualifying 11th the day before. He picked up his first points in the following round at Tsukuba, finishing in 11th place. He finished in the top ten in the following three races, with a best place finish of fifth at Okayama. Togashi qualified second in the final round at Suzuka, but dropped back during the race and finished 13th. He was second best Special Participation rider to Hayato Chishiki. Togashi also took part in the Motegi round of the 2025 Asia Road Racing Championship as a replacement rider, in the AP250 class. He qualified in 15th place but fell in both races and finished outside the points after rejoining.

In January 2026, it was announced Togashi would race in the J-GP3 class with SDG Jr. 56Racing again for 2026, this time under a regular license. After missing the opening race at Sugo due to injury, Togashi went on to secure his maiden podium in the second round at Autopolis. Having crossed the finish line in third place, he was later promoted to second following the disqualification of the race winner Hiroki Ono. He picked up another second place at Motegi, following a last lap battle with wildcard Hayato Chishiki and Shingo Iidaka, which moved him up the standings into third place, tied with Rei Wakamatsu, only a few points behind Naoko Takasugi and Hiroki Ono, with the latter withdrawing from the remainder of the season due to injury.

At the penultimate round at Okayama, Togashi had a race-long battle with championship rival Wakamatsu in wet conditions. On the final lap, Wakamatsu made contact with Togashi's rear and ran off the track, allowing Togashi to run towards the final sector on his own. However, an unexpected rain shower hit part of the track, which caused him to crash out of the lead. The race was immediately red-flagged and Togashi, who failed to return to pit lane within the required window, was classified in sixth place as the top non-finisher, while Wakamatsu was declared race-winner. Heading into the final round at Suzuka, Togashi had considerably smaller odds at the championship and ended the season with a fourth place, which moved him to third overall in the standings.

=== Moto4 Asia and European Cup (2026–) ===
Togashi was invited to the 2026 Moto4 Asia Cup selection event at Sepang in October 2025, where he was selected to compete full-time in 2026. After topping the pre-season tests in February at Sepang, he clinched his maiden podium at the opening round at Buriram, which was followed up by another podium at Sepang, missing out on the win by a millisecond. Following a double retirement at Motegi, he clinched his maiden Asia Cup win at Mandalika.

The week after his win, he was called up by Honda's Moto4 European Cup team to race at the final round at Misano. In his debut in Europe, Togashi qualified in ninth place, and finished the race in 12th after riding at the back of the front group for most of the race.

== Career statistics ==
=== FIM MiniGP Japan ===
(key) (Races in bold indicate pole position; races in italics indicate fastest lap)

Year	Bike	1	2	3	4	5	6	7	8	9	10	Pos	Pts
2023	Ohvale	**OKE**; **R1**; 1	**OKE**; **R2**; 1	MOT; R1; 1	MOT; R2; 1	TSU; R1; 3	TSU; R2; 2	SUZ; R1; 1	SUZ; R2; 1	**OKE**; **R1**; 1	**OKE**; **R2**; 1	1st	192

=== FIM MiniGP World Series ===
(key) (Races in bold indicate pole position; races in italics indicate fastest lap)

Year	Class	Bike	1	2	3	Pos	Pts
2023	160cc	Ohvale	VAL; R1; 3	VAL; R2; 2	VAL; SFR; 2	2nd	76

=== Tsukuba Road Race Championship ===
==== Races by year ====
(key) (Races in bold indicate pole position; races in italics indicate fastest lap. Superscript numbers indicate overall results, including both national and international classes.)

Year	Class	Bike	1	2	3	4	Pos	Pts
2024	J-GP3 (Note: National class.)	Honda	TSU1; 5^{6}	TSU2; 2^{2}	TSU3; 1^{1}	**TSU4**; 2^{2}	1st	76

=== Suzuka Sunday Road Race ===
==== Races by year ====
(key) (Races in bold indicate pole position; races in italics indicate fastest lap. Superscript numbers indicate overall results, including both national and international classes.)

Year	Class	Bike	1	2	3	4	Pos	Pts
2024	J-GP3 (Note: Competed under a Special Participation license which is ineligible for points.)	Honda	SUZ1	SUZ2; 5^{10}	SUZ3; Ret	SUZ4; 1^{2}	5th	36

=== All Japan Road Race Championship ===
==== Races by year ====
(key) (Races in bold indicate pole position; races in italics indicate fastest lap)

Year	Class	Bike	1	2	3	4	5	6	7	Pos	Pts
2024	J-GP3	Honda	MOT	SUG	TSU	AUT	OKA	SUZ; 13		NC	-
2025	J-GP3	Honda	SUG; Ret	TSU1; 17	TSU2; 11	MOT; 6	AUT; 10	OKA; 5	SUZ; 13	NC	-
2026	J-GP3	Honda	SUG; WD	AUT; 2	TSU; Ret	MOT; 2	OKA; 6†	SUZ; 4		3rd	66

- † – Rider did not finish the race, but was classified as he completed more than 75% of the race distance.

=== Asia Road Racing Championship ===
==== Races by year ====
(key) (Races in bold indicate pole position; races in italics indicate fastest lap)

Year	Class	Bike	1		2		3		4		5		6		Pos	Pts
Year	Class	Bike	R1	R2	R1	R2	R1	R2	R1	R2	R1	R2	R1	R2	Pos	Pts
2025	AP250	Honda	BUR	BUR	SEP	SEP	MOT; 26	MOT; 26	MAN	MAN	SEP	SEP	BUR	BUR	NC	0

=== Moto4 Asia Cup ===
==== Races by year ====
(key) (Races in bold indicate pole position, races in italics indicate fastest lap)

Year	Bike	1		2		3		4		5		6		Pos	Pts
Year	Bike	R1	R2	R1	R2	R1	R2	R1	R2	R1	R2	R1	R2	Pos	Pts
2026	Honda	BUR; 7	BUR; 3	SEP; 2	SEP; Ret	MOT; Ret	MOT; Ret	MAN; 4	MAN; 1	**SEP**; 7	**SEP**; 4	**LUS**; 11	**LUS**; 1	5th	135

=== Moto4 European Cup ===
==== Races by year ====
(key) (Races in bold indicate pole position; races in italics indicate fastest lap)

Year	Bike	1	2	3	4	5	6	7	8	9	10	11	Pos	Pts
2026	Honda	BAR	EST1	EST2	JER1	JER2	MAG1	MAG2	VAL1	VAL2	ARA	MIS; 12	30th	4
