= MARA Japan Industrial Institute Beranang =

Coordinates: 2.9046°N 101.8646°E

- MJII Beranang
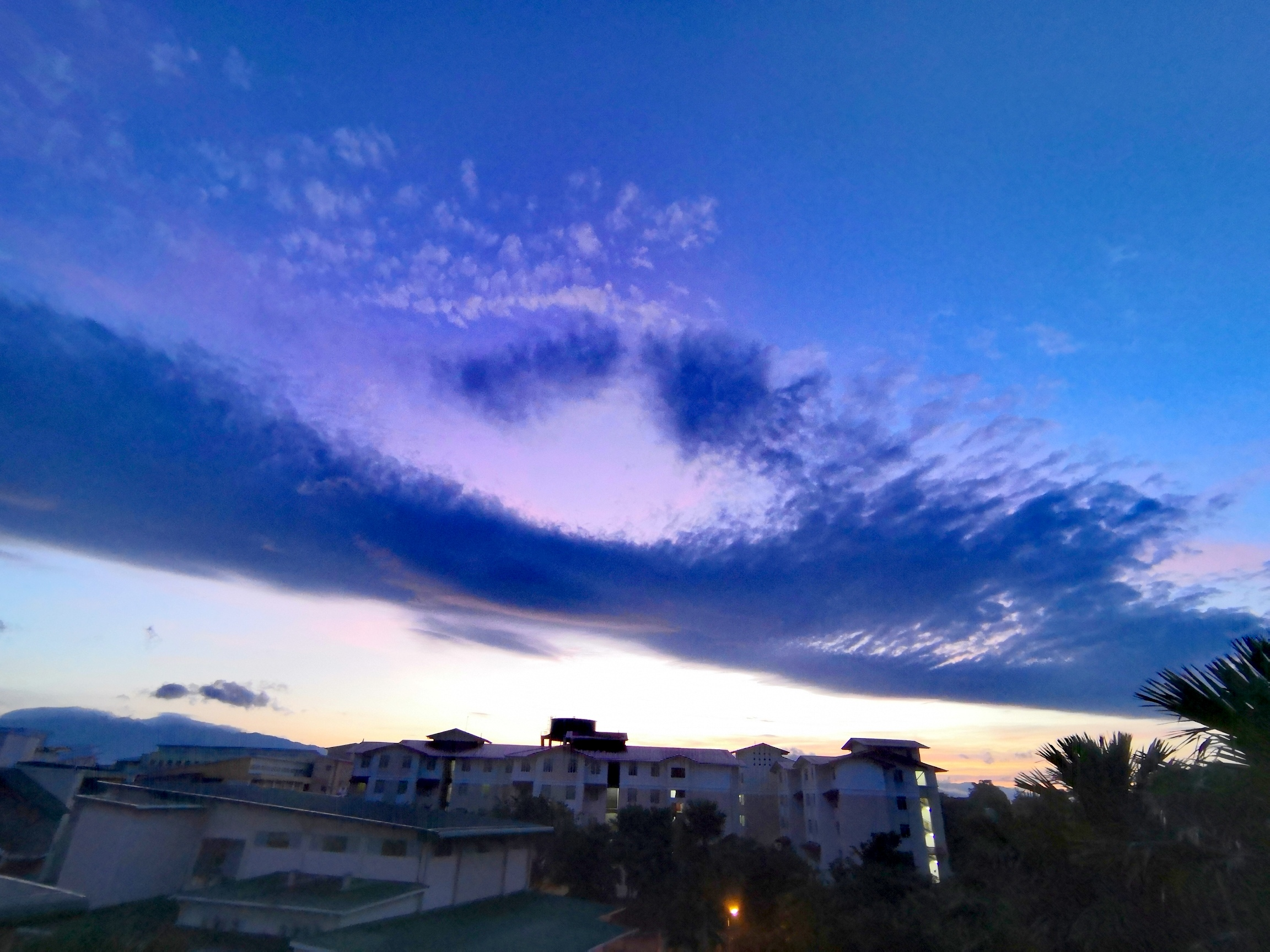
- Other name: 工業日本のMARA研究所
- Former name: Kolej Kemahiran Tinggi MARA Beranang
- Motto: Start Here Succeed Everywhere
- Type: Kolej Kemahiran Tinggi MARA
- Established: 2004
- Director: Ts. Dr. Mahazani bin Ali
- Deputy President: Mohd Norwawi Bin Ibrahim (Deputy President of Administrative & Student Affairs); Mohd Azman bin Mohd Rafaie (Deputy President of Academic Affairs); Aliff Hakimi
- Location: Lot 2333, Jalan Kajang Seremban, Beranang, Selangor, 43700, Malaysia
- Telephone no.: Tel : +603-87249344 / 9355; Fax : +603-87249275
- Website: mjii.kktm.edu.my

MARA Japan Industrial Institute (MJII, formerly known as MARA Skills Training College Beranang (KKTMBeranang)) is a highly skilled college under management skills and Technical Division (BKT) MARA in Beranang, Malaysia. KKTMBeranang starts in 2004 with an area of 22 acres. KKTMBeranang began operations in June 2008 and the start of the academic session in January 2009.

== History ==
KKTMBeranang start established as skilled manpower needs of the country, to make the difference compared to other centers where programs are engineered with a focus on the latest technology.

Japanese introduced in the syllabus as a second language after English.

On 19 September 2012, the Cabinet has agreed to change its name from KKTMBeranang to MARA Japan Industrial Institute (MJII).

== Vision and Mission ==
=== Vision ===
MJIIBeranang is committed to be the preferred centre for producing semi professional technologist and entrepreneurs in the electronics engineering field to meet industrial and society's needs.

=== Mission ===
To provide students with industrial knowledge and hands-on skills in electronics engineering with inclination towards japanese working culture and aspiring entrepreneurship.

== Study Program ==
=== The main program ===
Five Diploma in Electronic Engineering conducted at MJII accredited by MQA - The Malaysian Qualifications Agency (MQA Malaysia) for MJII students who are graduating from May 23, 2011, and the Public Service Department (PSD).

1. Diploma in Electronic Engineering (Embedded Systems) (MQA / FA1061)
2. Diploma in Electronic Engineering (Data Transmission & Networking) (MQA / FA1059)
3. Diploma in Electronic Engineering (Microelectronics) (MQA / FA1060)
4. Diploma in Electronic Engineering (Electronic Measurement & Control) (MQA / FA1063)
5. Diploma in Electronic Engineering (Robotics & Automation) (MQA / FA1062)

=== Higher Education Program - Japan (MJHEP) ===
This program is a study that is managed by MARA Director-General Datuk Ibrahim Ahmad MJHEP the MARA Education Foundation (YPM) and University of Kuala Lumpur (UniKL) conducted at MJII. The main language in this program is Japanese.

== Studies Scholarship Program to Japan ==
The students MJHEP and MJII can continue their studies to degree level in 22 universities in Japan in the same field. They will continue their studies at 11 public universities and 11 private universities.

== Host ==
MJII has always been a place for implementing large programs related to MARA.

1. Hari Raya MARA 2012, officiated by Datuk Seri Mohd Shafie bin Haji Apdal
2. 10th MARA invention and innovation competition IPMA all around Malaysia
3. Tree planting program in conjunction with the MARA 46th anniversary, cooperation with MJII and OISCA-OIMC, inaugurated by the general director of MARA
4. The signing of the memorandum of understanding between MARA and Brunel University, UK
5. MARA education sector committee meeting, chaired by Councilors and senior management of MARA
6. The briefing promotion, organized by the 100 unit counselor promotion
7. JAD Robocon 2012, JAD-YPM
8. Sharing program of experiences by youth entrepreneurs icon of United Kingdom, organized by MARA
9. Geek Matsuri organized by MJII
10. Lecture by Mr. Internet business. Irfan Khairi - JII
11. Briefing for the Master's program (sc) and PhD (sc), UTM
12. Briefing promotion program in conjunction with My Talent, Hulu Langat district education office
13. Innovation Council PMA 2013, MJII
14. WSMB 2015, MJII
15. i-entrepreneurs Seminar IKM/KKTM/MJII
16. Spekma (sports students) all around Malaysia 2015
17. MARA Maal Hijrah 2015
