= 2026 Moto4 Asia Cup =

Motorcycle road racing season

2026 Moto4 Asia Cup
| Previous: | 2025 | Next: | 2027 |

The 2026 Idemitsu Moto4 Asia Cup was the twelfth season of the competition, formerly known as the Asia Talent Cup, a motorcycle racing series organized by Dorna and sponsored by Idemitsu, which is intended for young riders throughout Asia and Oceania. The season featured six rounds at circuits in Asia, with each round comprising two races. The majority of the rounds served as support races for MotoGP. The season began at Buriram on 27 February, and concluded at Lusail on 8 November.

On 25 August 2026, Dorna Sports released a shortlist of 83 riders from 17 different nationalities which had been selected to participate in the 2027 Moto4 Asia Cup Selection Event. The event took place at the Sepang International Kart Circuit in Malaysia on 27 and 28 October 2026.

Japanese rider Hayato Chishiki won the championship in the final round at Lusail.

== Entry list ==
The entry list including the newly selected riders and returning riders was released on 26 November 2025. Indonesian Resky Yusuf was added to the grid in an updated entry list on 17 February 2026. All riders compete on identical 250cc Honda NSF250R motorcycles and use series-specified Pirelli tyres.

| No. | Rider | Status | Rounds |
|---|---|---|---|
| 2 | (Japan) Haruki Matsuyama | | All |
| 3 | (Indonesia) Bintang Pranata | R | All |
| 5 | (Thailand) Pacharagorn Thonggerdloung | R | 1–5 |
| 6 | (Malaysia) Naqib Rifqi | R | All |
| 7 | (Australia) Judd Plaisted | R | All |
| 8 | (Japan) Waku Kunitate | R | All |
| 9 | (China) Chen Shiyu | | All |
| 10 | (Thailand) Teerin Fleming (Note: Fleming was born in Australia but is competing under the flag of Thailand.) | | All |
| 11 | (Japan) Kotaro Togashi | R | All |
| 12 | (Australia) Bodie Paige | R | 1 |
| 13 | (Indonesia) Muh Badly | | All |
| 14 | (Malaysia) Qabil Irfan | R | 1–2, 5–6 |
| 15 | (Australia) Jake Paige | R | 1–2 |
| 16 | (Japan) Hayato Chishiki | R | All |
| 17 | (Indonesia) Maulana Malik | R | All |
| 18 | (Thailand) Tanutchanon Sriperchsuwan | R | All |
| 19 | (Malaysia) Qayyim Razin | R | All |
| 20 | (Thailand) Noprutpong Bunprawes | | All |
| 21 | (Hong Kong) Wen Ze Zhong | R | All |
| 22 | (Indonesia) Resky Yusuf | R | All |
wildcard and/or replacement riders
| 23 | (Thailand) Vachiravit Maidadpan | | 1 |
| 25 | (Thailand) Pongkun Aeimnoi | | 1, 5 |
| 26 | (Palestine) Mahdi Salem (Note: Salem was born in the United States but is competing under the flag of Palestine.) | | 2 |
| 27 | (Indonesia) Valera Octavianus | | 4 |
| 28 | (Indonesia) Abimanyu Fermadi | | 4–5 |
| 29 | (Vietnam) Ngo Nguyen Viet Tuan | | 3–6 |
| 30 | (Australia) Phoenix O'Brien | | 3 |
| 31 | (Qatar) Mohammed Almutawa | | 6 |

| Icon | Status |
|---|---|
| R | Rookie |

== Calendar ==
The full calendar was released on 17 February 2026. The Lusail round was initially scheduled to take place in April but was rescheduled to November due to the conflict in Iran.

| Round | Circuit | Date | Supporting | Map of circuit locations |
|---|---|---|---|---|
| 1 | (Thailand) Buriram International Circuit, Buriram | 27 February–1 March | MotoGP World Championship | 2026 Moto4 Asia Cup is located in Asian Football Confederation |
| 2 | (Malaysia) Sepang International Circuit, Sepang | 31 July–2 August | Malaysia Superbike Championship | 2026 Moto4 Asia Cup is located in Asian Football Confederation |
| 3 | (Japan) Twin Ring Motegi, Motegi | 2–4 October | MotoGP World Championship | 2026 Moto4 Asia Cup is located in Asian Football Confederation |
| 4 | (Indonesia) Mandalika International Street Circuit, Mandalika | 9–11 October | MotoGP World Championship | 2026 Moto4 Asia Cup is located in Asian Football Confederation |
| 5 | (Malaysia) Sepang International Circuit, Sepang | 30 October–1 November | MotoGP World Championship | 2026 Moto4 Asia Cup is located in Asian Football Confederation |
| 6 | (Qatar) Lusail International Circuit, Lusail | 6–8 November | MotoGP World Championship | 2026 Moto4 Asia Cup is located in Asian Football Confederation |

== Race results ==
| Round | | Circuit | Pole position | Fastest lap | Winning rider |
|---|---|---|---|---|---|
| 1 | R1 | (Thailand) Buriram International Circuit, Buriram | (Japan) Haruki Matsuyama | (Japan) Haruki Matsuyama | (Japan) Hayato Chishiki |
| 1 | R2 | (Thailand) Buriram International Circuit, Buriram | (Japan) Haruki Matsuyama | (Australia) Bodie Paige | (Japan) Hayato Chishiki |
| 2 | R1 | (Malaysia) Sepang International Circuit, Sepang | (Malaysia) Qabil Irfan | (Indonesia) Bintang Pranata | (Malaysia) Qayyim Razin |
| 2 | R2 | (Malaysia) Sepang International Circuit, Sepang | (Malaysia) Qabil Irfan | (Japan) Haruki Matsuyama | (Malaysia) Qayyim Razin |
| 3 | R1 | (Japan) Twin Ring Motegi, Motegi | (Japan) Hayato Chishiki | (Thailand) Teerin Fleming | (Japan) Hayato Chishiki |
| 3 | R2 | (Japan) Twin Ring Motegi, Motegi | (Japan) Hayato Chishiki | (Japan) Haruki Matsuyama | (Japan) Haruki Matsuyama (Note: Waku Kunitate was the first rider to cross the finish line, but received a penalty of 1 position for exceeding track limits on the final lap. Haruki Matsuyama, who was the second rider to cross the finish line, thus inherited the win.) |
| 4 | R1 | (Indonesia) Mandalika International Street Circuit, Mandalika | (Indonesia) Bintang Pranata | (Indonesia) Bintang Pranata | (Japan) Hayato Chishiki |
| 4 | R2 | (Indonesia) Mandalika International Street Circuit, Mandalika | (Indonesia) Bintang Pranata | (Japan) Kotaro Togashi | (Japan) Kotaro Togashi |
| 5 | R1 | (Malaysia) Sepang International Circuit, Sepang | (Japan) Kotaro Togashi | (Malaysia) Qabil Irfan | (Malaysia) Qabil Irfan |
| 5 | R2 | (Malaysia) Sepang International Circuit, Sepang | (Japan) Kotaro Togashi | (Japan) Haruki Matsuyama | (Japan) Hayato Chishiki (Note: Bintang Pranata was the first rider to cross the finish line, but received a penalty of 1 position for exceeding track limits on the final lap. Hayato Chishiki, who was the second rider to cross the finish line, thus inherited the win.) |
| 6 | R1 | (Qatar) Lusail International Circuit, Lusail | (Japan) Kotaro Togashi | (Indonesia) Maulana Malik | (Malaysia) Qabil Irfan (Note: Race was red-flagged and called after an incident with 3 laps to go. Qayyim Razin and Kotaro Togashi were running in first and second place respectively at the completion of the last full-lap before the red flag, but received time penalties for dangerous maneuvering. Qabil Irfan, who was in third place when the red flag was called, thus inherited the win.) |
| 6 | R2 | (Qatar) Lusail International Circuit, Lusail | (Japan) Kotaro Togashi | (Japan) Kotaro Togashi | (Japan) Kotaro Togashi |

== Championship standings ==
Scoring system
Points are awarded to the top fifteen finishers. A rider has to finish the race to earn points.

| Position | 1st | 2nd | 3rd | 4th | 5th | 6th | 7th | 8th | 9th | 10th | 11th | 12th | 13th | 14th | 15th |
| Points | 25 | 20 | 16 | 13 | 11 | 10 | 9 | 8 | 7 | 6 | 5 | 4 | 3 | 2 | 1 |

| Pos | Rider | BUR (Thailand) | | SEP (Malaysia) | | MOT (Japan) | | MAN (Indonesia) | | SEP (Malaysia) | | LUS (Qatar) | | Pts |
| Pos | Rider | R1 | R2 | R1 | R2 | R1 | R2 | R1 | R2 | R1 | R2 | R1 (Note: Race was red-flagged and called after an incident involving Kotaro Togashi, Naqib Rifqi and Hayato Chishiki. Naqib and Chishiki were not classified for failing to return to pit lane within 5 minutes of the red flag being called.) | R2 | Pts |
|---|---|---|---|---|---|---|---|---|---|---|---|---|---|---|
| 1 | (Japan) Hayato Chishiki | 1 | 1 | 7 | 5 | 1^{P} | 4^{P} | 1 | Ret | 13 | 1 | Ret | 7 | 170 |
| 2 | (Indonesia) Bintang Pranata | 3 | 5 | 4^{F} | Ret | 6 | 10 | 2^{P F} | 4^{P} | 2 | 2 | 4 | 6 | 152 |
| 3 | (Japan) Waku Kunitate | 2 | 4 | 5 | 2 | 3 | 2 | 6 | Ret | 5 | Ret | 3 | 5 | 148 |
| 4 | (Malaysia) Qabil Irfan | 6 | 2 | 3^{P} | 3^{P} | | | | | 1^{F} | 5 | 1 | 2 | 143 |
| 5 | (Japan) Kotaro Togashi | 7 | 3 | 2 | Ret | Ret | Ret | 4 | 1^{F} | 7^{P} | 4^{P} | 11^{P} | 1^{P F} | 135 |
| 6 | (Japan) Haruki Matsuyama | 5^{P F} | Ret^{P} | 6 | 4^{F} | 2 | 1^{F} | 3 | Ret | 11 | 7^{F} | 12 | 9 | 120 |
| 7 | (Indonesia) Resky Yusuf | 10 | Ret | 11 | 7 | 4 | 11 | Ret | 2 | 8 | 3 | 2 | 4 | 115 |
| 8 | (Indonesia) Muh Badly | 14 | 6 | 10 | 11 | Ret | 3 | 12 | 5 | 6 | Ret | 5 | 3 | 91 |
| 9 | (Malaysia) Qayyim Razin | 17 | 16 | 1 | 1 | DNS | Ret | Ret | 9 | 3 | 8 | 10 | 13 | 90 |
| 10 | (Thailand) Pacharagorn Thonggerdloung | 4 | 7 | 8 | 8 | 10 | 8 | 7 | 3 | 15 | 11 | | | 83 |
| 11 | (Indonesia) Maulana Malik | 15 | 14 | 15 | 15 | 7 | 12 | 5 | 7 | 4 | 6 | 9^{F} | 8 | 76 |
| 12 | (Thailand) Teerin Fleming | 9 | 10 | 13 | 10 | 5^{F} | 5 | 13 | 8 | 12 | Ret | 7 | 11 | 73 |
| 13 | (Thailand) Noprutpong Bunprawes | 8 | 11 | 12 | 9 | 11 | 13 | 15 | 6 | 9 | 10 | 8 | 14 | 66 |
| 14 | (Australia) Judd Plaisted | 13 | 20 | 9 | 6 | Ret | 7 | 11 | 11 | 21 | 14 | 14 | 15 | 44 |
| 15 | (Vietnam) Ngo Nguyen Viet Tuan | | | | | 8 | 6 | 9 | Ret | 18 | 13 | 6 | 12 | 42 |
| 16 | (Malaysia) Naqib Rifqi | 16 | 12 | Ret | Ret | Ret | 9 | 8 | Ret | 17 | 12 | Ret | 10 | 29 |
| 17 | (Hong Kong) Wen Ze Zhong | 21 | 13 | 16 | 13 | 9 | 14 | 14 | Ret | 14 | 16 | 13 | 16 | 22 |
| 18 | (Indonesia) Abimanyu Fermadi | | | | | | | 10 | Ret | 10 | 9 | | | 19 |
| 19 | (Thailand) Pongkun Aeimnoi | 11 | 8 | | | | | | | 16 | 18 | | | 13 |
| 20 | (Australia) Bodie Paige | 12 | 9^{F} | | | | | | | | | | | 11 |
| 21 | (China) Chen Shiyu | 20 | 18 | 18 | 17 | 12 | 15 | 17 | 12 | 19 | 15 | 15 | 17 | 11 |
| 22 | (Indonesia) Valera Octavianus | | | | | | | 16 | 10 | | | | | 6 |
| 23 | (Australia) Jake Paige | 19 | 17 | 14 | 12 | | | | | | | | | 6 |
| 24 | (Thailand) Tanutchanon Sriperchsuwan | 22 | 19 | 19 | 16 | 13 | 17 | 18 | Ret | 20 | 17 | 16 | 18 | 3 |
| 25 | (Australia) Phoenix O'Brien | | | | | 14 | 16 | | | | | | | 2 |
| 26 | (Palestine) Mahdi Salem | | | 17 | 14 | | | | | | | | | 2 |
| 27 | (Thailand) Vachiravit Maidadpan | 18 | 15 | | | | | | | | | | | 1 |
| | (Qatar) Mohammed Almutawa | | | | | | | | | | | DNS | DNS | 0 |
| Pos | Rider | R1 | R2 | R1 | R2 | R1 | R2 | R1 | R2 | R1 | R2 | R1 | R2 | Pts |
| Pos | Rider | BUR (Thailand) | | SEP (Malaysia) | | MOT (Japan) | | MAN (Indonesia) | | SEP (Malaysia) | | LUS (Qatar) | | Pts |
