= Shizuka Okazaki =

Japanese motorcycle racer

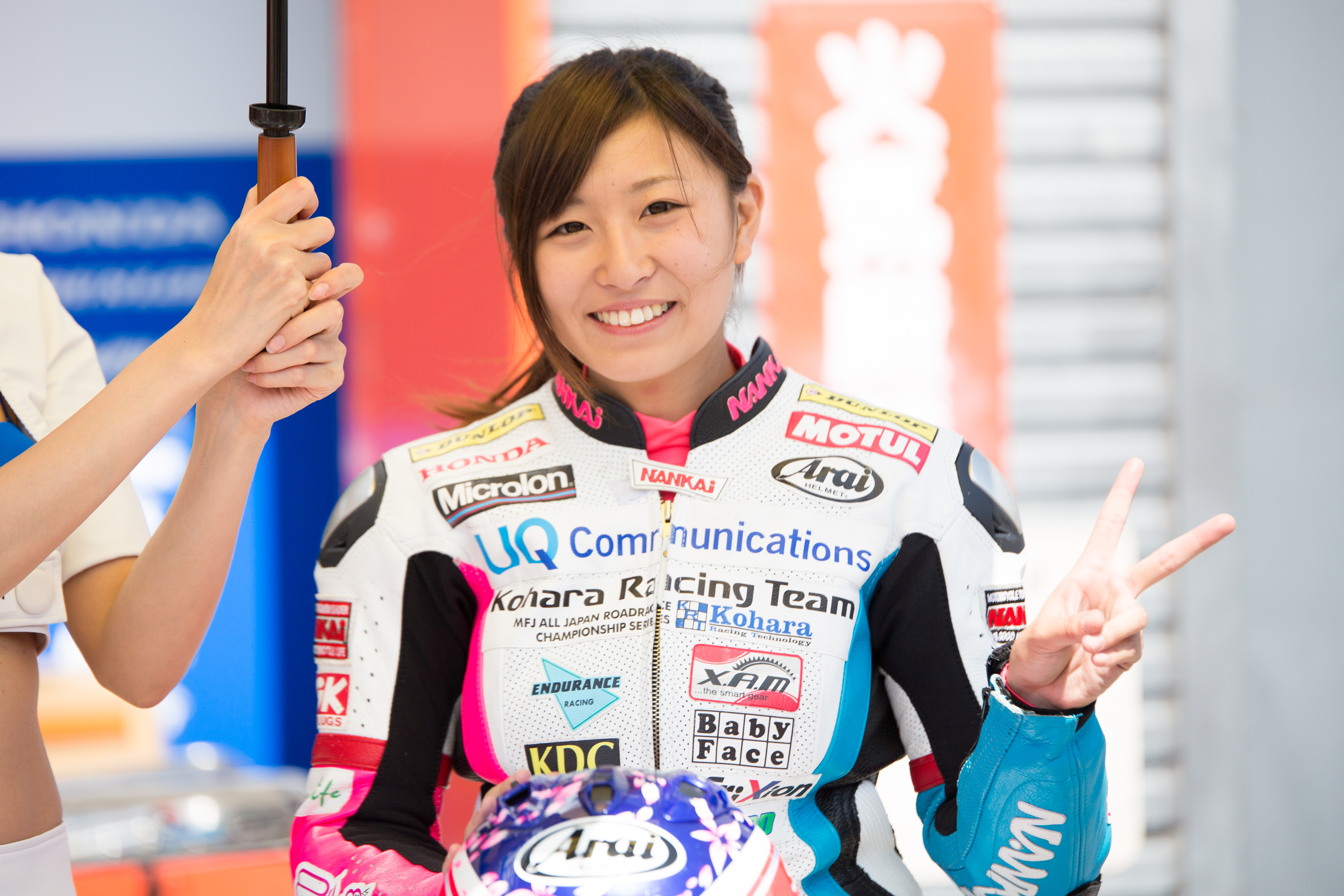
- Okazaki in 2016
- Nationality: Japanese
- Born: 12 June 1992 (age 34); Kanagawa Prefecture, Japan
- Current team: Japan Post NTT docomo Business
- Bike number: 3
Motorcycle racing career statistics
Moto3 World Championship
Active years	2016, 2018
Manufacturers	Honda
2018 championship position	42nd (0 pts)
Starts / Wins / Podiums / Poles / F. laps / Points; 2 / 0 / 0 / 0 / 0 / 0

Shizuka Okazaki (Japanese: 岡崎 静夏, Hepburn: Okazaki Shizuka; born 12 June 1992) is a Japanese motorcycle racer who competes in the J-GP3 class of the All Japan Road Race Championship for Japan Post NTT docomo Business, aboard a Honda NSF250R. In 2016, she became the first Japanese female rider to compete in a Grand Prix in 21 years.

== Career statistics ==
=== Grand Prix motorcycle racing ===
==== By season ====
Season	Class	Motorcycle	Team	Race	Win	Podium	Pole	FLap	Pts	Plcd
2016	Moto3	Honda	UQ & Teluru Kohara RT	1	0	0	0	0	0	NC
2018	Moto3	Honda	Kohara Racing Team	1	0	0	0	0	0	42nd
Total				**2**	**0**	**0**	**0**	**0**	**0**	

==== Races by year ====
Year	Class	Bike	1	2	3	4	5	6	7	8	9	10	11	12	13	14	15	16	17	18	19	Pos.	Pts
2016	Moto3	Honda	QAT	ARG	AME	SPA	FRA	ITA	CAT	NED	GER	AUT	CZE	GBR	RSM	ARA	JPN; 26	AUS	MAL	VAL		NC	0
2018	Moto3	Honda	QAT	ARG	AME	SPA	FRA	ITA	CAT	NED	GER	CZE	AUT	GBR	RSM	ARA	THA	JPN; 23	AUS	MAL	VAL	42nd	0

=== All Japan Road Race Championship ===
==== Races by year ====
(key) (Races in bold indicate pole position; races in italics indicate fastest lap)

Year	Class	Bike	1	2	3	4	5	6	7	Pos	Pts
2024	J-GP3	Honda	MOT; 6	SUG; 8	TSU; 11	AUT; 5	OKA; 6	SUZ; 3		4th	63
2025	J-GP3	Honda	SUG; 9	TSU1; 2	TSU2; 8	MOT; Ret	AUT; 5	OKA; 3	SUZ; 3	3rd	75.5
2026	J-GP3	Honda	SUG; 4	AUT; 3	**TSU**; Ret	MOT; Ret	OKA; 4	SUZ; 3		6th	61
