= 2026 All Japan Road Race Championship =

Motorcycle road racing season

The 2026 MFJ All Japan Road Race Championship (Japanese: 2026 MFJ全日本ロードレース選手権シリーズ, Hepburn: 2026 MFJ Zen Nihon Rōdo Rēsu Senshuken Shirīzu) was the 60th MFJ Road Race season of the All Japan Road Race Championship since the series-format started, and the 65th consecutive year since the first All Japan race was held after the MFJ was established. The season began at Motegi on 4 April, and concluded on 25 October at the 58th MFJ Grand Prix at Suzuka Circuit.

Ryo Mizuno, Takuma Kunimine, Rei Matsuoka and Shingo Iidaka were the JSB1000, ST1000, ST600 and J-GP3 champions, respectively.

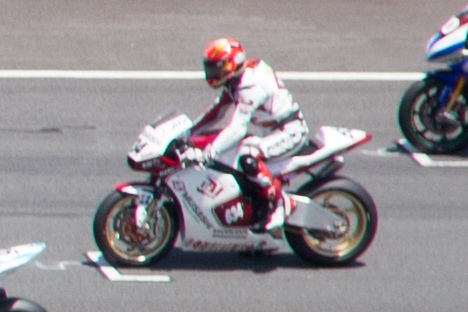
Ryo Mizuno was the JSB1000 champion.

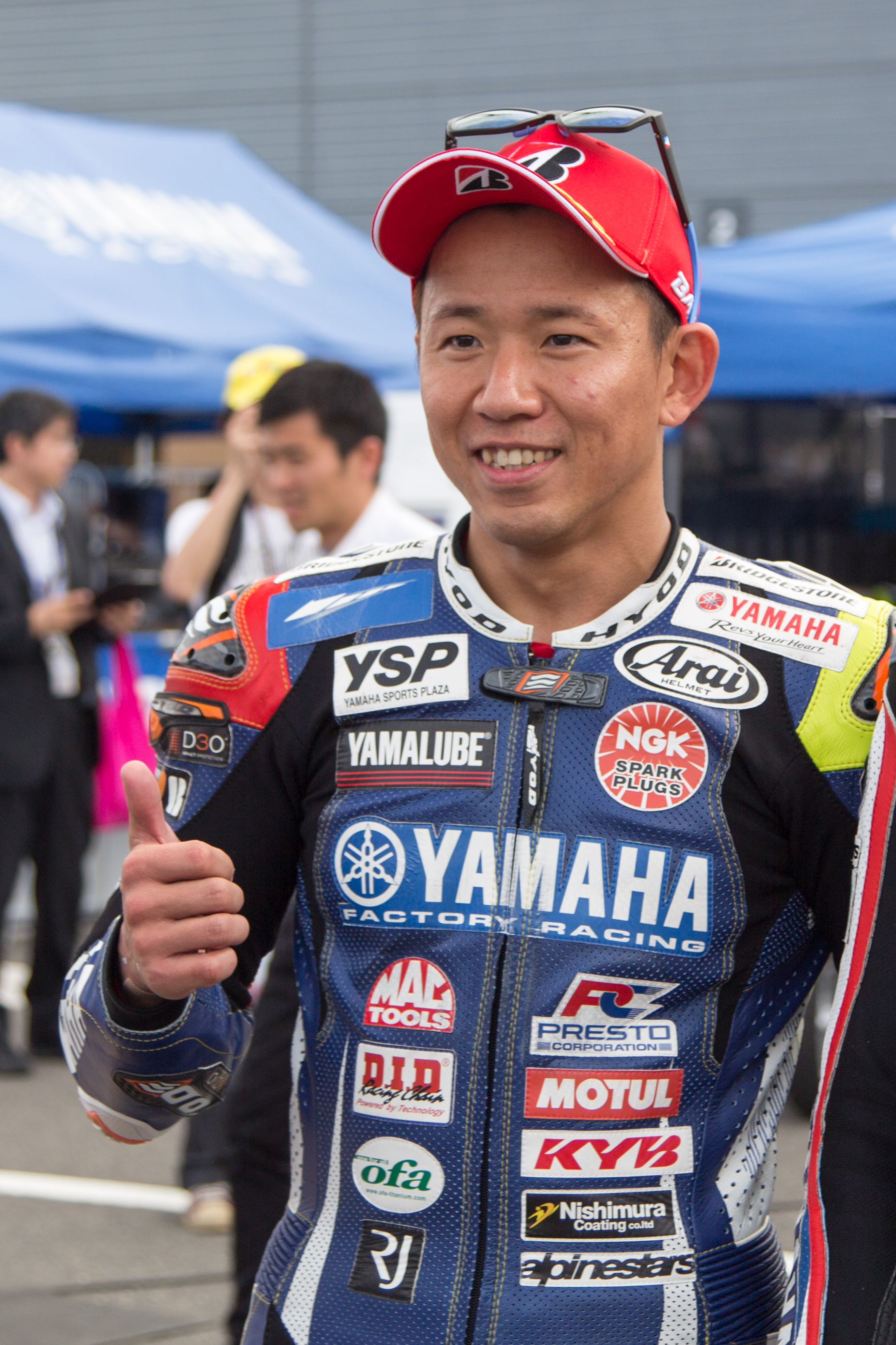
Katsuyuki Nakasuga retired at the end of the season after 25 years and 13 JSB1000 titles.

== Calendar ==
The updated provisional calendar was released on 24 October 2025.

| Round | Circuit | Location | Date | Class | Map of circuit locations |
|---|---|---|---|---|---|
| 1 | Mobility Resort Motegi | (Tochigi Prefecture) Motegi, Tochigi | 4–5 April | JSB1000 (Note: The race served as a support race to the 2026 Super Formula Championship round.) | 2026 All Japan Road Race Championship is located in Japan |
| 2 | Sportsland Sugo | (Miyagi Prefecture) Murata, Miyagi | 25–26 April | JSB1000†, ST1000, ST600†, J-GP3 | 2026 All Japan Road Race Championship is located in Japan |
| 3 | Autopolis | (Ōita Prefecture) Hita, Ōita | 30–31 May | JSB1000†, ST1000, ST600, J-GP3 | 2026 All Japan Road Race Championship is located in Japan |
| 4 | Tsukuba Circuit | (Ibaraki Prefecture) Shimotsuma, Ibaraki | 21 June | J-GP3 | 2026 All Japan Road Race Championship is located in Japan |
| 5 | Mobility Resort Motegi | (Tochigi Prefecture) Motegi, Tochigi | 29–30 August | JSB1000†, ST1000†, ST600, J-GP3 | 2026 All Japan Road Race Championship is located in Japan |
| 6 | Okayama International Circuit | (Okayama Prefecture) Mimasaka, Okayama | 26–27 September | JSB1000, ST1000, ST600, J-GP3 | 2026 All Japan Road Race Championship is located in Japan |
| 7 | Suzuka Circuit | (Mie Prefecture) Suzuka, Mie | 24–25 October | JSB1000†, ST1000, ST600, J-GP3 | 2026 All Japan Road Race Championship is located in Japan |

- † – Double-header

=== Calendar changes ===
- The Tsukuba round has been shortened to one day, and the J-GP3 class will no longer contest a double-header.
- The Autopolis round has been brought forward to before the summer break.

== Race results ==
| Round | Event | J-GP3 winner | ST600 winner | ST1000 winner | JSB1000 winner |
|---|---|---|---|---|---|
| 1 | (Tochigi Prefecture) Motegi 2&4 Race | | | | (Japan) Ryo Mizuno |
| 2 | (Miyagi Prefecture) Superbike Race at Sugo | (Japan) Hiroki Ono | (Japan) Amon Odaki | (Japan) Taiga Hada | (Japan) Ryo Mizuno |
| 2 | (Miyagi Prefecture) Superbike Race at Sugo | (Japan) Hiroki Ono | (Japan) Kengo Nagao | (Japan) Taiga Hada | (Japan) Ryo Mizuno |
| 3 | (Ōita Prefecture) Superbike Race in Kyushu | (Japan) Naoko Takasugi | (Japan) Tomoyoshi Koyama | (Japan) Taiga Hada | (Japan) Ryo Mizuno |
| 3 | (Ōita Prefecture) Superbike Race in Kyushu | (Japan) Naoko Takasugi | (Japan) Tomoyoshi Koyama | (Japan) Taiga Hada | (Japan) Ryo Mizuno |
| 4 | (Ibaraki Prefecture) Tsukuba Round | (Japan) Hiroki Ono | | | |
| 5 | (Tochigi Prefecture) Superbike Race at Motegi | (Japan) Hayato Chishiki | (Japan) Tetsuya Fujita | (Japan) Shota Ite | (Japan) Ryo Mizuno |
| 5 | (Tochigi Prefecture) Superbike Race at Motegi | (Japan) Hayato Chishiki | (Japan) Tetsuya Fujita | (Japan) Taiga Hada | (Japan) Ryo Mizuno |
| 6 | (Okayama Prefecture) Superbike Race at Okayama | (Japan) Rei Wakamatsu | (Japan) Rei Matsuoka | (Japan) Taiga Hada | (Japan) Tetsuta Nagashima |
| 7 | (Mie Prefecture) 58th MFJ Grand Prix at Suzuka | (Japan) Shingo Iidaka | (Japan) Rei Matsuoka | (Japan) Takuma Kunimine | (Japan) Ryo Mizuno |
| 7 | (Mie Prefecture) 58th MFJ Grand Prix at Suzuka | (Japan) Shingo Iidaka | (Japan) Rei Matsuoka | (Japan) Takuma Kunimine | (Japan) Katsuyuki Nakasuga |

== Regulation changes ==
Starting from the 2026 season, a concession system is introduced to the ST1000 class to reduce performance gaps between manufacturers, as well as to increase the number of entrants per race. The system allows approved low-cost concession parts designed to help manufacturers with a performance disadvantage reach a fair competitive baseline. Throughout the season, performance will be reviewed to determine whether a manufacturer should retain or have adjustments made to its concessions.

The championship also drops the system of assigning race numbers based on last season's standings, and riders will instead use their own chosen personal numbers. This will apply to all four classes and only to full-season entrants.

== Teams and riders ==
=== JSB1000 participants ===
| Team | Constructor | Motorcycle | Tyre | No. | Rider | Rounds |
|---|---|---|---|---|---|---|
| (Japan) I's Racing | BMW | M1000RR | B | 18 | (Japan) Tatsuya Nakamura | 1–3, 5–7 |
| (Japan) Sanmei Team Taro with SDG | BMW | M1000RR | B | 44 | (Japan) Taro Sekiguchi | 1–3, 5–7 |
| (Japan) Shinsyuren with Totec | BMW | M1000RR | B | 26 | (Japan) Hinata Nakajima | 1, 5 |
| (Japan) Auto Race Ube Racing Team | BMW | M1000RR | B | 3 | (Japan) Naomichi Uramoto | 7 |
| (Japan) Tone Team4413 BMW | BMW | M1000RR | D | 24 | (Japan) Ainosuke Yoshida | 1–3, 5–7 |
| (Japan) Tone Team4413 BMW | BMW | M1000RR | D | 46 | (Japan) Tomoya Hoshino | 1–3, 5–7 |
| (Japan) SDG Ducati Team Kagayama | Ducati | Panigale V4 R | B | 88 | (Japan) Ryo Mizuno | 1–3, 5–7 |
| (Japan) Astemo Pro Honda SI Racing | Honda | CBR1000RR-R | B | 4 | (Japan) Kohta Nozane | 1–3, 5–7 |
| (Japan) Astemo Pro Honda SI Racing | Honda | CBR1000RR-R | B | 32 | (Japan) Taiga Hada | 1 |
| (Japan) Honda Dream RT Sakurai | Honda | CBR1000RR-R | B | 5 | (Japan) Kazuki Ito | 1–3, 5–7 |
| (Japan) Honda Dream RT Sakurai | Honda | CBR1000RR-R | B | 12 | (Japan) Daijiro Hiura | 2, 7 |
| (Japan) SDG Team Harc-Pro Honda | Honda | CBR1000RR-R | B | 92 | (Japan) Yuki Kunii | 1–3, 5–7 |
| (Japan) Team ATJ | Honda | CBR1000RR-R | B | 6 | (Japan) Satoru Iwata | 1–3, 5–7 |
| (Japan) Team ATJ | Honda | CBR1000RR-R | B | 10 | (Japan) Kohki Suzuki | 1–3, 5–7 |
| Team Sugai Racing Japan | Honda | CBR1000RR-R | B | 27 | (Japan) Yoshiyuki Sugai | 1–3, 5–7 |
| (Japan) Honda HRC Test Team | Honda | CBR1000RR-R | B | 30 | (Japan) Takumi Takahashi | 7 |
| (Japan) F.C.C. TSR Honda France | Honda | CBR1000RR-R | B | 35 | (United Kingdom) John McPhee | 7 |
| (Japan) Dunlop Racing Team with Yahagi | Honda | CBR1000RR-R SP | D | 45 | (Japan) Tetsuta Nagashima | 1–3, 5–7 |
| (Japan) KRP Sanyoukougyo RS-Itoh | Kawasaki | ZX-10R | B | 31 | (Japan) Riku Sugawara | 1, 5–7 |
| (Japan) KRP Sanyoukougyo RS-Itoh | Kawasaki | ZX-10R | B | 33 | (Japan) Akira Yanagawa | 2–3 |
| (Japan) Team Suzuki CN Challenge | Suzuki | GSX-R1000R | B | 85 | (Japan) Takuya Tsuda | 1–3, 5–7 |
| (Japan) S-Sports Suzuki | Suzuki | GSX-R1000R | B | 95 | (Japan) Sho Nishimura | 1–3, 5–7 |
| (Japan) HLO Racing | Suzuki | GSX-R1000R | B | 29 | (Japan) Kota Higuchi | 6 |
| (Japan) Yoshimura SERT Motul | Suzuki | GSX-R1000R | B | 14 | (Japan) Cocoro Atsumi | 7 |
| (Japan) Yamaha Factory Racing Team | Yamaha | YZF-R1 | B | 1 | (Japan) Katsuyuki Nakasuga | 1–3, 5–7 |
| (Japan) Marumae Team Kodama | Yamaha | YZF-R1 | B | 50 | (Japan) Yuta Kodama | 1–3, 5–7 |
| (Japan) Team Baby Face | Yamaha | YZF-R1 | B | 16 | (Japan) Kazuma Tsuda | 1–3, 5–7 |
| (Japan) RSN | Yamaha | YZF-R1 | D | 21 | (Japan) Shinichi Nakatomi | 1–3, 5–7 |

Key
Regular rider
Replacement rider
Wildcard rider

=== ST1000 participants ===
All teams use series-specified Dunlop tyres.

| Team | Constructor | Motorcycle | Tyre | No. | Rider | Rounds |
|---|---|---|---|---|---|---|
| (Japan) Team Tatara Aprilia | Aprilia | RSV4 1100 Factory | D | 10 | (Japan) Ruka Wada | 2–3, 5–7 |
| (Japan) Team Tatara Aprilia | Aprilia | RSV4 1100 Factory | D | 16 | (Japan) Akito Haga | 2–3, 5–7 |
| (Japan) Shinsyuren with Totec | BMW | M1000RR | D | 34 | (Japan) Kyosuke Okuda | 5 |
| (Japan) Shinsyuren with Totec | BMW | M1000RR | D | 46 | (Japan) Kaito Toba | 7 |
| (Japan) Astemo Pro Honda SI Racing | Honda | CBR1000RR-R | D | 1 | (Japan) Taiga Hada | 2–3, 5–7 |
| (Japan) Astemo Pro Honda SI Racing | Honda | CBR1000RR-R | D | 5 | (Japan) Kohta Arakawa | 2–3, 5–7 |
| (Japan) Moto Bum Honda | Honda | CBR1000RR-R | D | 7 | (Japan) Rei Toshima | 2–3, 5–7 |
| (Japan) Nankai & Sanyo Kogyo RS-Itoh | Honda | CBR1000RR-R | D | 97 | (Japan) Yuto Sano | 2–3, 5–7 |
| RT Japan M Auto | Honda | CBR1000RR-R | D | 27 | (Japan) Tsukasa Murata | 2–3, 5–6 |
| RT Japan M Auto | Honda | CBR1000RR-R | D | 33 | (Japan) Yudai Kamei | 2–3, 5–7 |
| (Japan) SDG Team Harc-Pro Honda | Honda | CBR1000RR-R | D | 56 | (Japan) Teppei Nagoe | 2–3, 5–7 |
| (Japan) SDG Team Harc-Pro Honda | Honda | CBR1000RR-R | D | 40 | (Japan) Keito Abe | 7 |
| (Japan) Toho Racing | Honda | CBR1000RR-R | D | 15 | (Japan) Kosuke Sakumoto | 2–3, 5–7 |
| (Japan) Toho Racing | Honda | CBR1000RR-R | D | 104 | (Japan) Takuma Kunimine | 2–3, 5–7 |
| (Japan) Yahagi Racing Team | Honda | CBR1000RR-R | D | 12 | (Japan) Motoharu Ito | 2–3, 5–7 |
| (Japan) Team Izumi | Honda | CBR1000RR-R | D | 31 | (Japan) Takashi Arase | 3 |
| (Japan) Honda Blue Helmets MSC Kumamoto | Honda | CBR1000RR-R | D | 32 | (Japan) Hiromasa Okada | 3, 7 |
| (Japan) Honda Blue Helmets MSC Kumamoto | Honda | CBR1000RR-R | D | 35 | (Japan) Shudai Hasegawa | 5, 7 |
| (Japan) Team Bizenseiki | Honda | CBR1000RR-R | D | 19 | (Japan) Masaki Yamanaka | 6 |
| (Japan) Racing Team Seki | Honda | CBR1000RR-R | D | 39 | (Japan) Kazumasa Seki | 6 |
| (Japan) Power One Stop Daitoku Racing | Honda | CBR1000RR-R | D | 41 | (Japan) Takumi Nakahori | 7 |
| (Japan) MC Racing | Honda | CBR1000RR-R | D | 44 | (Japan) Ryosuke Katahira | 7 |
| (Japan) Kawasaki Plaza Racing Team | Kawasaki | ZX-10R | D | 43 | (Japan) Gun Mie | 2–3, 5–7 |
| (Japan) Kawasaki Plaza Racing Team | Kawasaki | ZX-10R | D | 64 | (Japan) Ryosuke Iwato | 2–3, 5–7 |
| (Japan) P-box Racing Team | Kawasaki | ZX-10R | D | 30 | (Japan) Kazuhisa Iwata | 3 |
| (Japan) Team Titan TKR Suzuki | Suzuki | GSX-R1000R | D | 9 | (Japan) Takeru Murase | 2–3, 5–7 |
| (Japan) Akeno Speed RC Koshien | Yamaha | YZF-R1 | D | 4 | (Japan) Shota Ite | 2–3, 5–7 |
| (Japan) Hisa31 with R-in Spirits | Yamaha | YZF-R1 | D | 25 | (Japan) Hisami Arai | 2–3, 5–7 |
| (Japan) Nitro Ryota Racing | Yamaha | YZF-R1 | D | 28 | (Thailand) Natetan Thongkoat | 2–3, 5–7 |
| (Japan) ST-Tec SFK & Pro-Tec | Yamaha | YZF-R1 | D | 22 | (Japan) Naoyuki Sato | 2–3, 7 |
| (Japan) 539ENAC Racing | Yamaha | YZF-R1 | D | 23 | (Japan) Masaaki Takada | 2, 7 |
| (Japan) GarageL8 Racing Team | Yamaha | YZF-R1 | D | 29 | (Japan) Minori Sato | 2, 7 |
| (Japan) Team Technica | Yamaha | YZF-R1 | D | 26 | (Japan) Yoshiyuki Hayashi | 3, 6–7 |
| (Japan) MotoJP Team Yossy | Yamaha | YZF-R1 | D | 36 | (Japan) Yoshimasa Shibata | 5 |
| (Japan) RSN | Yamaha | YZF-R1 | D | 17 | (Japan) Sota Furuyama | 6–7 |
| (Japan) Nichirin Racing | Yamaha | YZF-R1 | D | 37 | (Japan) Masaki Adachi | 6 |
| (Japan) Speedtec KBS with J-Trip | Yamaha | YZF-R1 | D | 38 | (Japan) Taichi Honda | 6 |

Key
Regular rider
Replacement rider
Wildcard rider

=== ST600 participants ===
All teams use series-specified Bridgestone tyres.

| Team | Constructor | Motorcycle | Tyre | No. | Rider | Rounds |
|---|---|---|---|---|---|---|
| (Japan) Astemo Pro Honda SI Racing | Honda | CBR600RR | B | 15 | (Japan) Kanta Hamada | 2–3, 5–7 |
| (Japan) Astemo Pro Honda SI Racing | Honda | CBR600RR | B | 31 | (Japan) Kenshin Nakatani | 2–3, 5–7 |
| (Japan) Battle Factory | Honda | CBR600RR | B | 1 | (Japan) Yuta Date | 2–3, 5–7 |
| (Japan) Battle Factory | Honda | CBR600RR | B | 25 | (Japan) Shun Miyazaki | 2–3, 5–6 |
| Japan Post NTT docomo Business | Honda | CBR600RR | B | 71 | (Japan) Tomoyoshi Koyama | 2–3, 5–7 |
| (Japan) Honda Suzuka Racing Team | Honda | CBR600RR | B | 26 | (Japan) Genki Nakajima | 2–3, 5–7 |
| (Japan) Moto Bum Honda | Honda | CBR600RR | B | 12 | (Japan) Kouga Matsumoto | 2–3, 5–7 |
| (Japan) Moto Bum Honda | Honda | CBR600RR | B | 21 | (Japan) Sho Tokuda | 2–3, 5–6 |
| (Japan) Moto Bum Honda | Honda | CBR600RR | B | 64 | (Japan) Rui Kusu | 2–3, 5–7 |
| (Japan) Moto Bum Honda | Honda | CBR600RR | B | 93 | (Japan) Riku Matsushima | 2–3, 5–7 |
| (Japan) SDG Team Harc-Pro Honda | Honda | CBR600RR | B | 10 | (Japan) Amon Odaki | 2–3, 5–7 |
| (Japan) SDG Team Harc-Pro Honda | Honda | CBR600RR | B | 13 | (Japan) Kai Aota | 2–3, 5 |
| (Japan) SE Competition | Honda | CBR600RR | B | 8 | (Japan) Toshiki Senda | 2–3, 5–7 |
| (Japan) TN45 Mirai Racing with Astemo | Honda | CBR600RR | B | 17 | (Japan) Tetsuya Fujita | 5–7 |
| (Japan) TN45 Mirai Racing with Astemo | Honda | CBR600RR | B | 38 | (Japan) Seiryu Ikegami | 2 |
| (Japan) TN45 Mirai Racing with Astemo | Honda | CBR600RR | B | 39 | (Japan) Hayato Chishiki | 3 |
| (Japan) TN45 Mirai Racing with Astemo | Honda | CBR600RR | B | 54 | (United States) Kensei Matsudaira | 7 |
| (Japan) Toho Racing | Honda | CBR600RR | B | 28 | (Japan) Mikuto Suzuki | 2–3, 5–7 |
| (Japan) Toho Racing | Honda | CBR600RR | B | 34 | (Japan) Anjyu Kasai | 2–3, 5–7 |
| (Japan) K71 Engineering RT | Honda | CBR600RR | B | 41 | (Japan) Yuki Shimoyama | 3 |
| (Japan) RSG Racing | Honda | CBR600RR | B | 43 | (Japan) Fumito Iwanami | 3 |
| (Japan) Grand Fine Racing | Honda | CBR600RR | B | 48 | (Japan) Koji Matsushita | 6 |
| (Japan) SDG Takeishi Technical Racing | Honda | CBR600RR | B | 49 | (Japan) Jean Kento Turner | 7 |
| (Japan) Team Eoric with Flash | Kawasaki | ZX-6R | B | 33 | (Japan) Kou Yamamoto | 2–3, 5–6 |
| (Japan) Akeno Speed | Yamaha | YZF-R6 | B | 52 | (Japan) Aoi Uezu | 2–3, 5–7 |
| (Japan) Garage L8 Racing Team | Yamaha | YZF-R6 | B | 29 | (Japan) Yusuke Ikeda | 2–3, 5–7 |
| (Japan) Ito Racing Borg Custom | Yamaha | YZF-R6 | B | 5 | (Japan) Rei Matsuoka | 2–3, 5–7 |
| (Japan) Ito Racing Borg Custom | Yamaha | YZF-R6 | B | 16 | (Japan) Shoma Yamane | 2–3, 5–7 |
| (Japan) Ito Racing Borg Custom | Yamaha | YZF-R6 | B | 35 | (Indonesia) Wahyu Nugroho | 2, 5, 7 |
| (Japan) Ito Racing Borg Custom | Yamaha | YZF-R6 | B | 46 | (Japan) Teppei Kugawa | 3 |
| (Japan) K-Fund GBS Racing | Yamaha | YZF-R6 | B | 7 | (Japan) Takumi Takahashi | 2–3, 5–7 |
| (Japan) Nitro Ryota Racing | Yamaha | YZF-R6 | B | 9 | (Japan) Keisuke Tanaka | 2–3, 5–7 |
| (Japan) Nitro Ryota Racing | Yamaha | YZF-R6 | B | 11 | (Japan) Ren Okabe | 2–3, 5–7 |
| (Japan) Ottima Corse | Yamaha | YZF-R6 | B | 36 | (Japan) Shogo Kawasaki | 2–3, 5–6 |
| (Japan) Racing Team Seki | Yamaha | YZF-R6 | B | 32 | (Japan) Yuta Tarusawa | 2–3, 5–6 |
| (Japan) Teamkenken | Yamaha | YZF-R6 | B | 50 | (Japan) Kengo Nagao | 2–3, 5–7 |
| (Japan) Team Tec2 and 24Service | Yamaha | YZF-R6 | B | 30 | (Japan) Yoshihiro Toyohara | 2–3, 5–6 |
| (Japan) Webike Team Norick | Yamaha | YZF-R6 | B | 27 | (Japan) Kairi Moriyama | 2–3, 5, 7 |
| (Japan) RT Morino Kumasan & Garage L8 | Yamaha | YZF-R6 | B | 37 | (Japan) Tatsuya Watabe | 2 |
| (Japan) P-box Racing Team | Yamaha | YZF-R6 | B | 40 | (Japan) Haruto Oota | 3, 6 |
| (Japan) 4ing RT Motul | Yamaha | YZF-R6 | B | 44 | (Japan) Azusa Nomura | 3 |
| (Japan) Nakayama Seimitu | Yamaha | YZF-R6 | B | 45 | (Japan) Hikaru Akiyoshi | 3 |
| (Japan) PHD 2436GO Fujimotodenki | Yamaha | YZF-R6 | B | 47 | (Japan) Kohei Onozaki | 5 |
| (Japan) Fun Factory Takeaki Motors | Yamaha | YZF-R6 | B | 51 | (Japan) Yuhi Hirajo | 7 |
| (Japan) Straight Arrow with Tech-R | Yamaha | YZF-R6 | B | 53 | (Japan) Shinya Mikami | 7 |

Key
Regular rider
Replacement rider
Wildcard rider

=== J-GP3 participants ===
| Team | Constructor | Motorcycle | Tyre | No. | Rider | Rounds |
|---|---|---|---|---|---|---|
| Japan Post NTT docomo Business | Honda | NSF250R | B | 3 | (Japan) Shizuka Okazaki | 2–7 |
| Japan Post NTT docomo Business | Honda | NSF250R | B | 23 | (Japan) Rei Wakamatsu | 2–7 |
| (Japan) Like a Wind Club Y's | Honda | NSF250R | B | 9 | (Japan) Motonari Matsuda | 2–7 |
| (Japan) Marumae Dream Kitakyushu CParis | Honda | NSF250R | B | 5 | (Japan) Hayato Oota | 2–7 |
| (Japan) Nozawa Racing Family Malusaka | Honda | NSF250R | B | 17 | (Japan) Hidenori Nozawa | 2, 4–7 |
| (Japan) Plan Bee Racing MTR | Honda | NSF250R | B | 24 | (Japan) Arata Irimoto | 2–7 |
| (Japan) Team Ak1Tech TxS | Honda | NSF250R | B | 25 | (Japan) Rukiya Yamamoto | 2–7 |
| (Japan) Team Deshi with RG Niwa | Honda | NSF250R | B | 28 | (Japan) Norihiko Murata | 2–7 |
| (Japan) Team Plusone | Honda | NSF250R | B | 11 | (Japan) Shun Takenaka | 2–7 |
| (Japan) Team Mari Racing | Honda | NSF250R | B | 20 | (Japan) Shizuka Fujiwara | 2, 4–5, 7 |
| (Japan) Battle Factory & K1 Racing | Honda | NSF250R | B | 29 | (Australia) Teerin Fleming | 2–4 |
| (Japan) Yuki Densetsu Marudai & Hara R | Honda | NSF250R | B | 30 | (Japan) Kazuhiro Osawa | 2, 4–5 |
| (Japan) WJ Factory | Honda | NSF250R | B | 31 | (Taiwan) Huang Pinhung | 2, 4–5 |
| (Japan) Marumae MTR PlanBee Racing | Honda | NSF250R | B | 21 | (Japan) Masaki Tokudome | 3, 7 |
| (Japan) Team Yosuke | Honda | NSF250R | B | 33 | (Japan) Yosuke Hosaka | 4 |
| (Japan) Flex Racing Team & MH Ohara | Honda | NSF250R | B | 36 | (Japan) Keiichi Kishida | 6–7 |
| (Japan) Rairaku Kikaku with RG Niwa | Honda | NSF250R | B | 19 | (Japan) Hiroshi Kaneko | 7 |
| (Japan) Raptor Velocity Racing | Honda | NSF250R | B | 37 | (Japan) Daijiro Hario | 7 |
| (Japan) SDG Takeishi Technical Racing | Honda | NSF250R | B | 38 | (Australia) Jackson Macdonald | 7 |
| (Japan) Astemo SI Racing with Thai Honda (Japan) Astemo SI Racing with RSC | Honda | NSF250R | B | 14 | (Thailand) Techin In-Aphai | 2–7 |
| (Japan) Astemo SI Racing with Thai Honda (Japan) Astemo SI Racing with RSC | Honda | NSF250R | B | 27 | (Thailand) Pongkun Aeimnoi | 2–4 |
| (Japan) Astemo SI Racing with Thai Honda (Japan) Astemo SI Racing with RSC | Honda | NSF250R | B | 35 | (Thailand) Vachiravit Maidadpan | 5–7 |
| (Japan) Astemo SI Racing with Thai Honda (Japan) Astemo SI Racing with RSC | Honda | NSF250R | D | 16 | (Japan) Rintaro Todaka | 2–7 |
| (Japan) Honda Vietnam Kohara RT | Honda | NSF250R | D | 26 | (Vietnam) Ngo Nguyen Viet Tuan | 5–7 |
| (Japan) Honda Vietnam Kohara RT | Honda | NSF250R | D | 32 | (Vietnam) Nguyen Huu Tri | 3–4 |
| (Japan) P.MU 7C Galespeed | Honda | NSF250R | D | 1 | (Japan) Hiroki Ono | 2–5 |
| (Japan) P.MU 7C Galespeed | Honda | NSF250R | D | 82 | (Japan) Toranosuke Yoshihara | 4–7 |
| (Japan) Team Life Honda Dream Kitakyushu | Honda | NSF250R | D | 8 | (Japan) Eito Nakamura | 2–7 |
| (Japan) Honda Dream RT Sakurai | Honda | NSF250R | D | 80 | (Japan) Yugo Nakayama | 3–7 |
| (Japan) Team HRS | Honda | NSF250R | D | 81 | (Japan) Koshi Kuhara | 3, 5, 7 |
| (Japan) Team HRS | Honda | NSF250R | D | 84 | (Japan) Keishiro Takahashi | 7 |
| (Japan) Kijima Kiss RC with Katsudenki | Honda | NSF250R | P | 10 | (Japan) Shingo Iidaka | 2–7 |
| (Japan) SDG Jr. 56Racing | Honda | NSF250R | P | 56 | (Japan) Kotaro Togashi | 2–7 |
| (Japan) TN45 Mirai Racing with Astemo | Honda | NSF250R | P | 34 | (Japan) Hayato Chishiki | 4–5, 7 |
| (Japan) TN45 Mirai Racing with Astemo | Honda | NSF250R | P | 83 | (Japan) Waku Kunitate | 5 |
| (Japan) Team Naoko KTM | KTM | RC250R | B | 75 | (Japan) Naoko Takasugi | 2–7 |

Key
Regular rider
S-class rider (Note: Special Participation (特別参加枠) riders, typically aged 12–18 with domestic or junior licenses, may compete in select rounds by invitation but are ineligible for points or prizes, even if they finish in point-scoring positions.)
Replacement rider
Wildcard rider

== Championship standings ==
Scoring system

Points are awarded to the top fifteen finishers. A rider has to finish the race to earn points. The same point system is used across the four classes. Three extra-points are awarded in the final round at the 58th MFJ Grand Prix at Suzuka Circuit.

| Position | 1st | 2nd | 3rd | 4th | 5th | 6th | 7th | 8th | 9th | 10th | 11th | 12th | 13th | 14th | 15th |
| Points (Rd. 1–6) | 25 | 20 | 16 | 13 | 11 | 10 | 9 | 8 | 7 | 6 | 5 | 4 | 3 | 2 | 1 |
| Points (Rd. 7) | 28 | 23 | 19 | 16 | 14 | 13 | 12 | 11 | 10 | 9 | 8 | 7 | 6 | 5 | 4 |

=== Riders' standings ===
==== JSB1000 ====
| Pos. | Rider | Bike | MOT (Tochigi Prefecture) | SUG (Miyagi Prefecture) | | AUT (Ōita Prefecture) | | MOT (Tochigi Prefecture) | | OKA (Okayama Prefecture) | SUZ (Mie Prefecture) | | Pts |
| Pos. | Rider | Bike | MOT (Tochigi Prefecture) | R1 | R2 | R1 | R2 | R1 | R2 | OKA (Okayama Prefecture) | R1 | R2 | Pts |
|---|---|---|---|---|---|---|---|---|---|---|---|---|---|
| 1 | (Japan) Ryo Mizuno | Ducati | 1^{P F} | 1^{P} | 1^{P F} | 1^{F} | 1^{F} | 1^{P F} | 1^{P F} | 3 | 1^{F} | 3 | 238 |
| 2 | (Japan) Katsuyuki Nakasuga | Yamaha | Ret | 2^{F} | 2 | 2^{P} | 2^{P} | 3 | 4 | Ret | 2 | 1^{F} | 160 |
| 3 | (Japan) Tetsuta Nagashima | Honda | 2 | 4 | 3 | 3 | 3 | 5 | 2 | 1^{F} | 3^{P} | 15^{P} | 160 |
| 4 | (Japan) Yuki Kunii | Honda | 3 | 5 | 5 | 7 | 5 | 4 | 3 | 2 | 4 | 7 | 135 |
| 5 | (Japan) Kohta Nozane | Honda | 4 | 3 | 4 | 4 | 4 | 2 | 9 | Ret^{P} | 12 | 10 | 111 |
| 6 | (Japan) Satoru Iwata | Honda | 6 | 7 | 10 | 9 | 8 | 6 | 8 | 4 | 6 | 9 | 94 |
| 7 | (Japan) Kohki Suzuki | Honda | 7 | 10 | 8 | 6 | 7 | Ret | 7 | 5 | 8 | 8 | 84 |
| 8 | (Japan) Kazuki Ito | Honda | Ret | 6 | 6 | 5 | 10 | 7 | DSQ | 7 | 13 | 13 | 67 |
| 9 | (Japan) Takuya Tsuda | Suzuki | 19† | 9 | 12 | 8 | 9 | 8 | 6 | 10 | 11 | 12 | 65 |
| 10 | (Japan) Sho Nishimura | Suzuki | 8 | 18† | 9 | 15 | 6 | 9 | 5 | 13 | 14 | 14 | 57 |
| 11 | (Japan) Daijiro Hiura | Honda | | 8 | 7 | | | | | | 5 | 6 | 44 |
| 12 | (Japan) Taro Sekiguchi | BMW | 14 | 11 | 11 | 11 | 11 | 10 | 10 | 12 | 16 | 16 | 38 |
| 13 | (Japan) Tomoya Hoshino | BMW | 9 | 13 | Ret | 12 | 12 | 12 | Ret | 8 | 15 | 17 | 34 |
| 14 | (Japan) Yuta Kodama | Yamaha | 10 | 12 | 13 | 10 | 13 | 11 | Ret | 9 | 19 | 20 | 34 |
| 15 | (Japan) Takumi Takahashi | Honda | | | | | | | | | 9 | 2 | 33 |
| 16 | (United Kingdom) John McPhee | Honda | | | | | | | | | 10 | 4 | 25 |
| 17 | (Japan) Cocoro Atsumi | Suzuki | | | | | | | | | 7 | 11 | 20 |
| 18 | (Japan) Ainosuke Yoshida | BMW | 16 | 15 | 18 | 18 | 16 | 13 | 13 | 6 | 17 | 18 | 17 |
| 19 | (Japan) Shinichi Nakatomi | Yamaha | 12 | 14 | 16 | 14 | 15 | 15 | 11 | 15 | 18 | 19 | 16 |
| 20 | (Japan) Naomichi Uramoto | BMW | | | | | | | | | Ret | 5 | 14 |
| 21 | (Japan) Taiga Hada | Honda | 5 | | | | | | | | | | 11 |
| 22 | (Japan) Tatsuya Nakamura | BMW | 15 | Ret | 14 | 17 | 17 | 17 | DNS | 11 | DNQ | DNQ | 8 |
| 23 | (Japan) Kazuma Tsuda | Yamaha | 13 | 19† | 15 | Ret | DNS | DNS | 12 | Ret | DNQ | DNQ | 8 |
| 24 | (Japan) Hinata Nakajima | BMW | 11 | | | | | DNS | DNS | | | | 5 |
| 25 | (Japan) Akira Yanagawa | Kawasaki | | 16 | 17 | 13 | 14 | | | | | | 5 |
| 26 | (Japan) Yoshiyuki Sugai | Honda | 18 | 17 | 19 | 16 | 18 | 16 | 14 | 14 | DNQ | DNQ | 4 |
| 27 | (Japan) Riku Sugawara | Kawasaki | 17 | WD | WD | | | 14 | DNS | DNS | 20 | 21 | 2 |
| | (Japan) Kota Higuchi | Suzuki | | | | | | | | Ret | | | 0 |

| Colour | Result |
|---|---|
| Gold | Winner |
| Silver | Second place |
| Bronze | Third place |
| Green | Points classification |
| Blue | Non-points classification |
| Blue | Non-classified finish (NC) |
| Purple | Retired, not classified (Ret) |
| Red | Did not qualify (DNQ) |
| Red | Did not pre-qualify (DNPQ) |
| Black | Disqualified (DSQ) |
| White | Did not start (DNS) |
| White | Withdrew (WD) |
| White | Race cancelled (C) |
| Blank | Did not practice (DNP) |
| Blank | Did not arrive (DNA) |
| Blank | Excluded (EX) |

P – Pole position
F – Fastest lap

Notes:

- † – Rider did not finish the race, but was classified as they completed more than 75% of the race distance.

==== ST1000 ====
| Pos. | Rider | Bike | SUG (Miyagi Prefecture) | AUT (Ōita Prefecture) | MOT (Tochigi Prefecture) | | OKA (Okayama Prefecture) | SUZ (Mie Prefecture) | Pts |
| Pos. | Rider | Bike | SUG (Miyagi Prefecture) | AUT (Ōita Prefecture) | R1 | R2 | OKA (Okayama Prefecture) | SUZ (Mie Prefecture) | Pts |
|---|---|---|---|---|---|---|---|---|---|
| 1 | (Japan) Takuma Kunimine | Honda | 2^{P} | 2^{P} | 2 | 2 | 2^{P} | 1 | 128 |
| 2 | (Japan) Taiga Hada | Honda | 1^{F} | 1^{F} | 4 | 1^{F} | 1^{F} | Ret^{F} | 113 |
| 3 | (Japan) Kohta Arakawa | Honda | 3 | 4 | 15^{F} | 3 | 3 | 3 | 81 |
| 4 | (Japan) Teppei Nagoe | Honda | 5 | 3 | 3 | 6 | 9 | 4 | 76 |
| 5 | (Japan) Shota Ite | Yamaha | 4 | Ret | 1 | 5 | 6 | Ret | 59 |
| 6 | (Japan) Rei Toshima | Honda | 7 | 8 | 6 | 11 | 4 | 5 | 59 |
| 7 | (Japan) Kosuke Sakumoto | Honda | 10 | 16 | 7 | 7 | 5 | 7 | 47 |
| 8 | (Japan) Ruka Wada | Aprilia | 8 | 7 | 11 | 8 | Ret | 6 | 43 |
| 9 | (Japan) Motoharu Ito | Honda | 9 | 5 | 5 | 4 | Ret | 23† | 42 |
| 10 | (Japan) Yudai Kamei | Honda | 19† | 6 | Ret^{P} | 12^{P} | 7 | 8 | 34 |
| 11 | (Japan) Gun Mie | Kawasaki | 13 | 10 | 13 | 9 | 8 | 12 | 34 |
| 12 | (Japan) Yuto Sano | Honda | 11 | DNS | 9 | 10 | 11 | 10 | 32 |
| 13 | (Japan) Ryosuke Iwato | Kawasaki | 12 | 9 | 12 | 15 | 20 | 11 | 24 |
| 14 | (Japan) Keito Abe | Honda | | | | | | 2 | 23 |
| 15 | (Japan) Takeru Murase | Suzuki | 6 | DNS | 10 | 19† | 10 | 21† | 22 |
| 16 | (Japan) Akito Haga | Aprilia | 20† | 11 | 16 | Ret | 13 | 13 | 14 |
| 17 | (Japan) Shudai Hasegawa | Honda | | | 14 | Ret | | 9 | 12 |
| 18 | (Japan) Kyosuke Okuda | BMW | | | 8 | 13 | | | 11 |
| 19 | (Japan) Sota Furuyama | Yamaha | | | | | 12 | 14 | 9 |
| 20 | (Japan) Naoyuki Sato | Yamaha | 17 | 13 | | | | 15 | 7 |
| 21 | (Thailand) Natetan Thongkoat | Yamaha | 16 | 12 | 17 | 18 | 16 | 19 | 4 |
| 22 | (Japan) Masaki Adachi | Yamaha | | | | | 14 | | 2 |
| 23 | (Japan) Yoshimasa Shibata | Yamaha | | | Ret | 14 | | | 2 |
| 24 | (Japan) Hiromasa Okada | Honda | | 14 | | | | 17 | 2 |
| 25 | (Japan) Minori Sato | Yamaha | 14 | | | | | 18 | 2 |
| 26 | (Japan) Yoshiyuki Hayashi | Yamaha | | Ret | | | 15 | 16 | 1 |
| 27 | (Japan) Hisami Arai | Yamaha | 18 | 15 | 18 | 16 | 18 | DNQ | 1 |
| 28 | (Japan) Masaaki Takada | Yamaha | 15 | | | | | 20 | 1 |
| 29 | (Japan) Taichi Honda | Yamaha | | | | | 17 | | 0 |
| 30 | (Japan) Tsukasa Murata | Honda | DNQ | 17 | 19 | 17 | 19 | | 0 |
| 31 | (Japan) Takashi Arase | Honda | | 18† | | | | | 0 |
| 32 | (Japan) Kaito Toba | BMW | | | | | | 22†^{P} | 0 |
| | (Japan) Takumi Nakahori | Honda | | | | | | Ret | 0 |
| | (Japan) Masaki Yamanaka | Honda | | | | | Ret | | 0 |
| | (Japan) Ryosuke Katahira | Honda | | | | | | DNS | 0 |
| | (Japan) Kazumasa Seki | Honda | | | | | DNS | | 0 |
| | (Japan) Keisuke Tsukahara | Kawasaki | | | | | | DNQ | 0 |
| | (Japan) Kazuhisa Iwata | Kawasaki | | DNQ | | | | | 0 |

| Colour | Result |
|---|---|
| Gold | Winner |
| Silver | Second place |
| Bronze | Third place |
| Green | Points classification |
| Blue | Non-points classification |
| Blue | Non-classified finish (NC) |
| Purple | Retired, not classified (Ret) |
| Red | Did not qualify (DNQ) |
| Red | Did not pre-qualify (DNPQ) |
| Black | Disqualified (DSQ) |
| White | Did not start (DNS) |
| White | Withdrew (WD) |
| White | Race cancelled (C) |
| Blank | Did not practice (DNP) |
| Blank | Did not arrive (DNA) |
| Blank | Excluded (EX) |

P – Pole position
F – Fastest lap

Notes:

- † – Rider did not finish the race, but was classified as they completed more than 75% of the race distance.

==== ST600 ====
| Pos. | Rider | Bike | SUG (Miyagi Prefecture) | | AUT (Ōita Prefecture) | MOT (Tochigi Prefecture) | OKA (Okayama Prefecture) | SUZ (Mie Prefecture) | Pts |
| Pos. | Rider | Bike | R1 | R2 | AUT (Ōita Prefecture) | MOT (Tochigi Prefecture) | OKA (Okayama Prefecture) | SUZ (Mie Prefecture) | Pts |
|---|---|---|---|---|---|---|---|---|---|
| 1 | (Japan) Rei Matsuoka | Yamaha | 5 | 2 | 14 | 5 | 1^{P F} | 1 | 97 |
| 2 | (Japan) Tomoyoshi Koyama | Honda | 4 | 3 | 1 | 2^{P} | 13 | 3 | 96 |
| 3 | (Japan) Kengo Nagao | Yamaha | Ret^{P} | 1^{F} | 4 | 3 | 3 | 2^{F} | 93 |
| 4 | (Japan) Yuta Date | Honda | 2 | 5^{P} | 3^{F} | 10 | 2 | 6 | 86 |
| 5 | (Japan) Amon Odaki | Honda | 1 | Ret | 2 | 8 | 25 | 12 | 60 |
| 6 | (Japan) Takumi Takahashi | Yamaha | 3^{F} | 23† | 5 | 4^{F} | 4 | 22†^{P} | 53 |
| 7 | (Japan) Toshiki Senda | Honda | 8 | 7 | Ret^{P} | 11 | 8 | 4 | 46 |
| 8 | (Japan) Tetsuya Fujita | Honda | | | | 1 | 10 | 9 | 41 |
| 9 | (Japan) Shoma Yamane | Yamaha | Ret | 6 | 7 | 12 | 12 | 7 | 39 |
| 10 | (Japan) Keisuke Tanaka | Yamaha | 9 | 24† | 6 | 7 | DNS | 14 | 31 |
| 11 | (Japan) Kanta Hamada | Honda | 13 | 12 | 8 | 14 | 9 | 13 | 30 |
| 12 | (Japan) Ren Okabe | Yamaha | 7 | Ret | 9 | Ret | 6 | Ret | 26 |
| 13 | (Japan) Genki Nakajima | Honda | 16 | 14 | 12 | 18 | 5 | 11 | 25 |
| 14 | (Japan) Seiryu Ikegami | Honda | 6 | 4 | | | | | 23 |
| 15 | (Indonesia) Wahyu Nugroho | Yamaha | 11 | 9 | | 6 | | | 22 |
| 16 | (Japan) Aoi Uezu | Yamaha | 10 | 10 | 10 | Ret | 19 | 15 | 22 |
| 17 | (Japan) Kenshin Nakatani | Honda | Ret | Ret | Ret | 9 | 15 | 8 | 19 |
| 18 | (Japan) Kairi Moriyama | Yamaha | 12 | 13 | 13 | Ret | WD | 10 | 19 |
| 19 | (Japan) Kouga Matsumoto | Honda | Ret | 22 | 19 | 24 | 14 | 5 | 16 |
| 20 | (Japan) Kai Aota | Honda | Ret | 8 | 11 | 13 | WD | | 16 |
| 21 | (Japan) Riku Matsushima | Honda | 17 | 15 | 15 | 20 | 7 | WD | 11 |
| 22 | (Japan) Rui Kusu | Honda | 14 | 11 | DNS | 15 | Ret | 17 | 8 |
| 23 | (Japan) Mikuto Suzuki | Honda | 25† | 16 | 17 | 17 | 11 | Ret | 5 |
| 24 | (Japan) Yusuke Ikeda | Yamaha | 15 | Ret | 21 | 21 | 18 | 19 | 1 |
| 25 | (Japan) Jean Kento Turner | Honda | | | | | | 16 | 0 |
| 26 | (Japan) Anjyu Kasai | Honda | 19 | Ret | 23 | 22 | 16 | DNS | 0 |
| 27 | (Japan) Kou Yamamoto | Kawasaki | Ret | 17 | 18 | 16 | | | 0 |
| 28 | (Japan) Teppei Kugawa | Yamaha | | | 16 | | | | 0 |
| 29 | (Japan) Shun Miyazaki | Honda | 18 | Ret | DNS | 19 | 17 | | 0 |
| 30 | (United States) Kensei Matsudaira | Honda | | | | | | 18 | 0 |
| 31 | (Japan) Shogo Kawasaki | Yamaha | 21 | 18 | 29 | 23 | 22 | | 0 |
| 32 | (Japan) Tatsuya Watabe | Yamaha | 22 | 19 | | | | | 0 |
| 33 | (Japan) Yuhi Hirajo | Yamaha | | | | | | 20 | 0 |
| 34 | (Japan) Yuta Tarusawa | Yamaha | 24 | 21 | 25 | 26 | 20 | | 0 |
| 35 | (Japan) Sho Tokuda | Honda | 20 | Ret | 20 | Ret | WD | | 0 |
| 36 | (Japan) Yoshihiro Toyohara | Yamaha | 23 | 20 | 22 | 25 | 24 | | 0 |
| 37 | (Japan) Shinya Mikami | Yamaha | | | | | | 21 | 0 |
| 38 | (Japan) Koji Matsushita | Honda | | | | | 21 | | 0 |
| 39 | (Japan) Haruto Oota | Yamaha | | | 24 | | 23 | | 0 |
| 40 | (Japan) Hikaru Akiyoshi | Yamaha | | | 26 | | | | 0 |
| 41 | (Japan) Kohei Onozaki | Yamaha | | | | 27 | | | 0 |
| 42 | (Japan) Fumito Iwanami | Honda | | | 27 | | | | 0 |
| 43 | (Japan) Yuki Shimoyama | Honda | | | 28 | | | | 0 |
| 44 | (Japan) Azusa Nomura | Yamaha | | | 30 | | | | 0 |
| 45 | (Japan) Hayato Chishiki | Honda | | | 31† | | | | 0 |

| Colour | Result |
|---|---|
| Gold | Winner |
| Silver | Second place |
| Bronze | Third place |
| Green | Points classification |
| Blue | Non-points classification |
| Blue | Non-classified finish (NC) |
| Purple | Retired, not classified (Ret) |
| Red | Did not qualify (DNQ) |
| Red | Did not pre-qualify (DNPQ) |
| Black | Disqualified (DSQ) |
| White | Did not start (DNS) |
| White | Withdrew (WD) |
| White | Race cancelled (C) |
| Blank | Did not practice (DNP) |
| Blank | Did not arrive (DNA) |
| Blank | Excluded (EX) |

P – Pole position
F – Fastest lap

Notes:

- † – Rider did not finish the race, but was classified as they completed more than 75% of the race distance.

==== J-GP3 ====
| Pos. | Rider | Bike | SUG (Miyagi Prefecture) | AUT (Ōita Prefecture) | TSU (Ibaraki Prefecture) | MOT (Tochigi Prefecture) | OKA‡ (Okayama Prefecture) | SUZ (Mie Prefecture) | Pts |
|---|---|---|---|---|---|---|---|---|---|
| 1 | (Japan) Shingo Iidaka | Honda | DNS | 7 | 5 | 3 | 2 | 1^{P} | 84 |
| 2 | (Japan) Naoko Takasugi | KTM | 5 | 1^{F} | 3^{F} | DSQ | 3 | 16 | 68 |
| 3 | (Japan) Kotaro Togashi | Honda | WD | 2 | Ret | 2 | 6† | 4 | 66 |
| 4 | (Japan) Rei Wakamatsu | Honda | 2 | Ret | 2 | 20†^{F} | 1^{F} | 22† | 65 |
| 5 | (Japan) Hayato Oota | Honda | 9 | 10 | 8 | 6 | 9†^{P} | 2 | 61 |
| 6 | (Japan) Shizuka Okazaki | Honda | 4 | 3 | Ret^{P} | Ret | 4 | 3 | 61 |
| 7 | (Japan) Hiroki Ono | Honda | 1^{P} | DSQ^{P} | 1 | DNS | | | 50 |
| 8 | (Japan) Shun Takenaka | Honda | 3^{F} | 18† | 6 | 8 | DNS | 10 | 43 |
| 9 | (Japan) Eito Nakamura | Honda | 11 | 9 | Ret | 10 | 5 | 7 | 41 |
| 10 | (Japan) Hayato Chishiki | Honda | | | 4 | 1^{P} | | 25†^{F} | 38 |
| 11 | (Thailand) Techin In-Aphai | Honda | 7 | Ret | 12 | 4 | 7† | 26† | 35 |
| 12 | (Thailand) Pongkun Aeimnoi | Honda | 6 | 4 | 7 | | | | 32 |
| 13 | (Japan) Rintaro Todaka | Honda | 10 | 11 | 9 | 9 | 10† | 24† | 31 |
| 14 | (Japan) Motonari Matsuda | Honda | 12 | 8 | 11 | DNS | Ret | 6 | 30 |
| 15 | (Thailand) Vachiravit Maidadpan | Honda | | | | 5 | 8† | 21 | 19 |
| 16 | (Australia) Teerin Fleming | Honda | 8 | 5 | Ret | | | | 19 |
| 17 | (Japan) Rukiya Yamamoto | Honda | Ret | 12 | 10 | Ret | 17† | 13 | 16 |
| 18 | (Japan) Arata Irimoto | Honda | 14 | 14 | 18 | 16 | 15† | 9 | 15 |
| 19 | (Japan) Daijiro Hario | Honda | | | | | | 5 | 14 |
| 20 | (Japan) Masaki Tokudome | Honda | | 6 | | | | 23† | 10 |
| 21 | (Vietnam) Ngo Nguyen Viet Tuan | Honda | | | | 11 | 12† | 20 | 9 |
| 22 | (Japan) Norihiko Murata | Honda | 17 | 17 | 19 | 15 | 18† | 12 | 8 |
| 23 | (Japan) Shizuka Fujiwara | Honda | 16 | | 16 | 13 | | 14 | 8 |
| 24 | (Taiwan) Huang Pinhung | Honda | 15 | | Ret | 12 | | | 5 |
| 25 | (Japan) Hidenori Nozawa | Honda | 13 | | 15 | 19 | 16† | 17 | 4 |
| 26 | (Japan) Keiichi Kishida | Honda | | | | | 14† | Ret | 2 |
| 27 | (Japan) Yosuke Hosaka | Honda | | | 14 | | | | 2 |
| 28 | (Vietnam) Nguyen Huu Tri | Honda | | 16 | 17 | | | | 0 |
| 29 | (Japan) Kazuhiro Osawa | Honda | 18 | | 20 | Ret | | | 0 |
| 30 | (Australia) Jackson Macdonald | Honda | | | | | | 19 | 0 |
| | (Japan) Hiroshi Kaneko | Honda | | | | | | Ret | 0 |
Special Participation riders ineligible for points
| | (Japan) Yugo Nakayama | Honda | | 13 | 13 | 14 | 11† | 8 | |
| | (Japan) Waku Kunitate | Honda | | | | 7 | | | |
| | (Japan) Keishiro Takahashi | Honda | | | | | | 11 | |
| | (Japan) Toranosuke Yoshihara | Honda | | | Ret | 18 | 13† | 18 | |
| | (Japan) Koshi Kuhara | Honda | | 15 | | 17 | | 15 | |

| Colour | Result |
|---|---|
| Gold | Winner |
| Silver | Second place |
| Bronze | Third place |
| Green | Points classification |
| Blue | Non-points classification |
| Blue | Non-classified finish (NC) |
| Purple | Retired, not classified (Ret) |
| Red | Did not qualify (DNQ) |
| Red | Did not pre-qualify (DNPQ) |
| Black | Disqualified (DSQ) |
| White | Did not start (DNS) |
| White | Withdrew (WD) |
| White | Race cancelled (C) |
| Blank | Did not practice (DNP) |
| Blank | Did not arrive (DNA) |
| Blank | Excluded (EX) |

P – Pole position
F – Fastest lap

Notes:

- † – Rider did not finish the race, but was classified as they completed more than 75% of the race distance.
- ‡ – The Okayama race was red-flagged on the final lap after sudden rainfall caused several riders to crash at the final corner. As the leading group reached the wet final sector, further riders, including race leader Kotaro Togashi, also crashed before the red flag was shown. Under MFJ regulations (27-3-2 and 28-3-1/2), riders unable to return to pit lane within five minutes of the red flag were classified behind those who satisfied the return requirement.
