= List of mergers in Saitama Prefecture =

Here is a list of mergers in Saitama Prefecture, Japan since the Heisei era.

== Mergers from April 1, 1999 to Present ==
- On January 1, 2001 - The cities of Urawa, Ōmiya and Yono were merged to create the city of Saitama.
- On January 1, 2005 - The village of Naguri (from Iruma District) was merged into the expanded city of Hannō.
- On April 1, 2005 - The old city of Chichibu absorbed the town of Yoshida, and the villages of Arakawa and Ōtaki (all from Chichibu District) to create the new and expanded city of Chichibu.
- On April 1, 2005 - The city of Iwatsuki was merged into the expanded city of Saitama.
- On October 1, 2005 - The village of Ryōkami (from Chichibu District) was merged into the expanded town of Ogano.
- On October 1, 2005 - The town of Fukiage (from Kitaadachi District), and the town of Kawasato (from Kitasaitama District) were merged into the expanded city of Kōnosu.
- On October 1, 2005 - The city of Kamifukuoka was merged with the town of Ōi (from Iruma District) to create the city of Fujimino.
- On October 1, 2005 - The town of Shōwa (from Kitakatsushika District) was merged into the expanded city of Kasukabe.
- On October 1, 2005 - The old city of Kumagaya absorbed the towns of Menuma and Ōsato (both from Ōsato District) to create the new and expanded city of Kumagaya.
- On January 1, 2006 - The village of Kamiizumi (from Kodama District) was merged into the expanded town of Kamikawa.
- On January 1, 2006 - The old city of Fukaya absorbed the towns of Hanazono, Kawamoto and Okabe (all from Ōsato District) to create the new and expanded city of Fukaya.
- On January 1, 2006 - The village of Minamikawara (from Kitasaitama District) was merged into the expanded city of Gyōda.
- On January 10, 2006 - The town of Kodama (from Kodama District) was merged into the expanded city of Honjō.
- On February 1, 2006 - The village of Tamagawa (from Hiki District) was merged into the expanded village of Tokigawa to become the town of Tokigawa.
- On February 13, 2007 - The town of Kōnan (from Ōsato District) was merged into the expanded city of Kumagaya.
- On March 23, 2010 - The old city of Kazo absorbed the towns of Kisai, Kitakawabe and Ōtone (all from Kitasaitama District) to create the new and expanded city of Kazo. Kitasaitama District was dissolved as a result of this merger.
- On March 23, 2010 - The old city of Kuki absorbed the town of Shōbu (from Minamisaitama District), and the towns of Kurihashi and Washimiya (both from Kitakatsushika District) to create the new and expanded city of Kuki.
- On October 11, 2011 - The city of Hatogaya was merged into the expanded city of Kawaguchi.
- On October 1, 2012 - The town of Shiraoka (from Minamisaitama District) was elevated to city status. This has left Minamisaitama District with one municipality.
