= Kita-Saitama District =

Former district in Japan

Coordinates: 36°07′53″N 139°36′06″E

Kita-Saitama District (北埼玉郡, Kita-Saitama-gun) was a district located in Saitama Prefecture, Japan.

Prior to its abolition, Kita-Saitama District had three towns:

- Town of Kisai (騎西町; Kisai-machi)
- Town of Kitakawabe (北川辺町; Kitakawabe-machi)
- Town of Ōtone (大利根町; Ōtone-machi)

On March 23, 2010, all three towns merged with the city of Kazo to newly create the city of Kazo and the district dissolved. As a result, it was the first district to dissolve within Saitama Prefecture since the districts were reorganized in 1896.

== Timeline ==
- January 1, 1971 - The village of Ōtone becomes the town of Ōtone.(2 towns, 3 village)
- April 1, 1971 - The village of Kitakawabe becomes the town of Kitakawabe.(3 towns, 2 village)
- May 1, 2001 - The village of Kawasato becomes the town of Kawasato. (4 towns, 1 village)
- October 1, 2005 - The town of Kawasato merged into the city of Kōnosu. (3 towns, 1 village)
- January 1, 2006 - The village of Minamikawara merged into the city of Gyōda. (3 towns)
- March 23, 2010 - The towns of Kisai, Kitakawabe, and Ōtone merged with the city of Kazo to newly form the city of Kazo. Kita-Saitama District was dissolved the same day.

== See also ==
- Minami-Saitama District, Saitama
- List of dissolved districts of Japan
