= Himemiya Station =

Railway station in Miyashiro, Saitama Prefecture, Japan

TS29 Himemiya Station 姫宮駅
- The west entrance in May 2026

General information
- Location: 1-1-1 Kawabata, Miyashiro Town, Minami-Saitama District, Saitama Prefecture 345-0804; Japan
- Coordinates: 36.0043°N 139.7389°E
- Operator: Tōbu Railway
- Line: Tōbu Skytree Line
- Distance: 38.4 km (23.9 mi) from Asakusa
- Platforms: 2 side platforms
- Tracks: 2

Other information
- Station code: TS-29
- Website: Official website

History
- Opened: 1 September 1927; 99 years ago

Passengers
- FY2024: 2,331 daily boardings

Services
Preceding station	Tobu Railway	Following station
Kita-Kasukabe TS28 towards Oshiage	Tobu Skytree Line Semi Express	Tōbu-Dōbutsu-Kōen TS30 Terminus
Kita-Kasukabe TS28 towards Asakusa	Tobu Skytree Line Section Semi Express Local	Tōbu-Dōbutsu-Kōen TS30 Terminus
Location
- Location within Saitama Prefecture Location within Kanto Area Location within Japan

Himemiya Station (姫宮駅, Himemiya-eki) is a passenger railway station located in the town of Miyashiro, Saitama, Japan, operated by the private railway operator Tōbu Railway.

== Line ==
Himemiya Station is served by the Tōbu Skytree Line, and is located 38.4 km from the line's Tokyo terminus at Asakusa.

== Station layout ==
The station has two opposed side platforms serving two tracks, with an elevated station building located above the tracks and platform.

=== Platforms ===
1	Tōbu Skytree Line	for Kasukabe, Shin-Koshigaya, Kita-Senju, and Asakusa; Tokyo Metro Hanzomon Line for Shibuya; Tokyu Den-en-toshi Line for Chūō-rinkan; Tokyo Metro Hibiya Line for Ueno and Naka-meguro
2	Tōbu Skytree Line	for Tōbu-Dōbutsu-Kōen; Tobu Isesaki Line for Kuki; Tōbu Nikkō Line for Minami-Kurihashi

The east entrance in May 2026

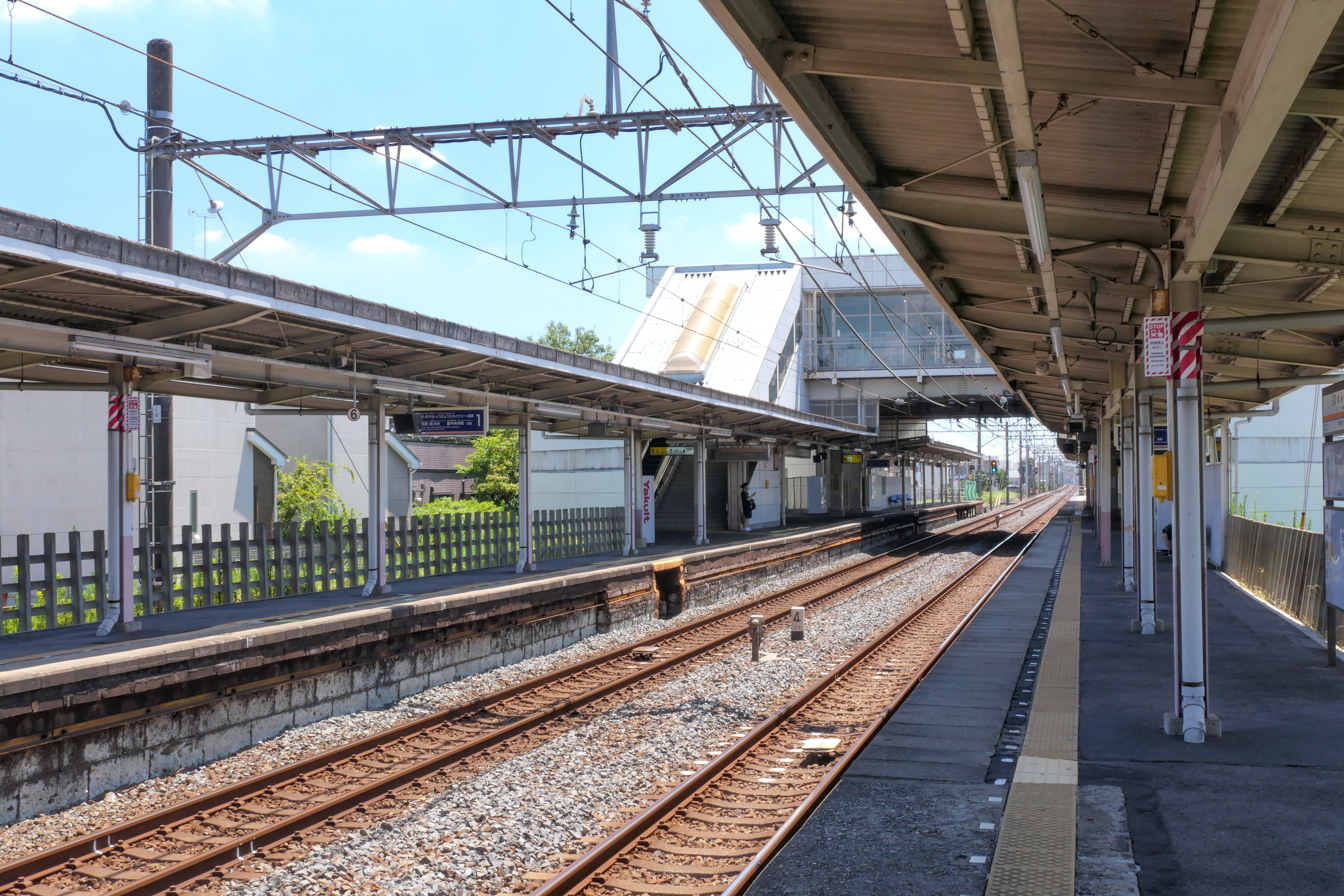
The station platforms in August 2021

== History ==
Himemiya Station opened on 1 September 1927.

From 17 March 2012, station numbering was introduced on all Tōbu lines, with Himemiya Station becoming "TS-29".

== Passenger statistics ==
In fiscal 2024, the station was used by an average of 2,331 passengers daily (boarding passengers only).

== Surrounding area ==
- Miyashiro High School
- Miyashiro Himemiya Post Office
- Himemiya Shrine

== See also ==
- List of railway stations in Japan
