= Kawasato =

Kawasato may refer to:

- Kawasato, Saitama, a former town in Kitasaitama District, Saitama Prefecture, Japan
- 4910 Kawasato, a main-belt asteroid

== People with the surname ==
- Nobuhiro Kawasato (川里 信弘), Japanese astronomer
