= Yagyū Station =

Railway station in Kazo, Saitama Prefecture, Japan

TN06 Yagyū Station 柳生駅
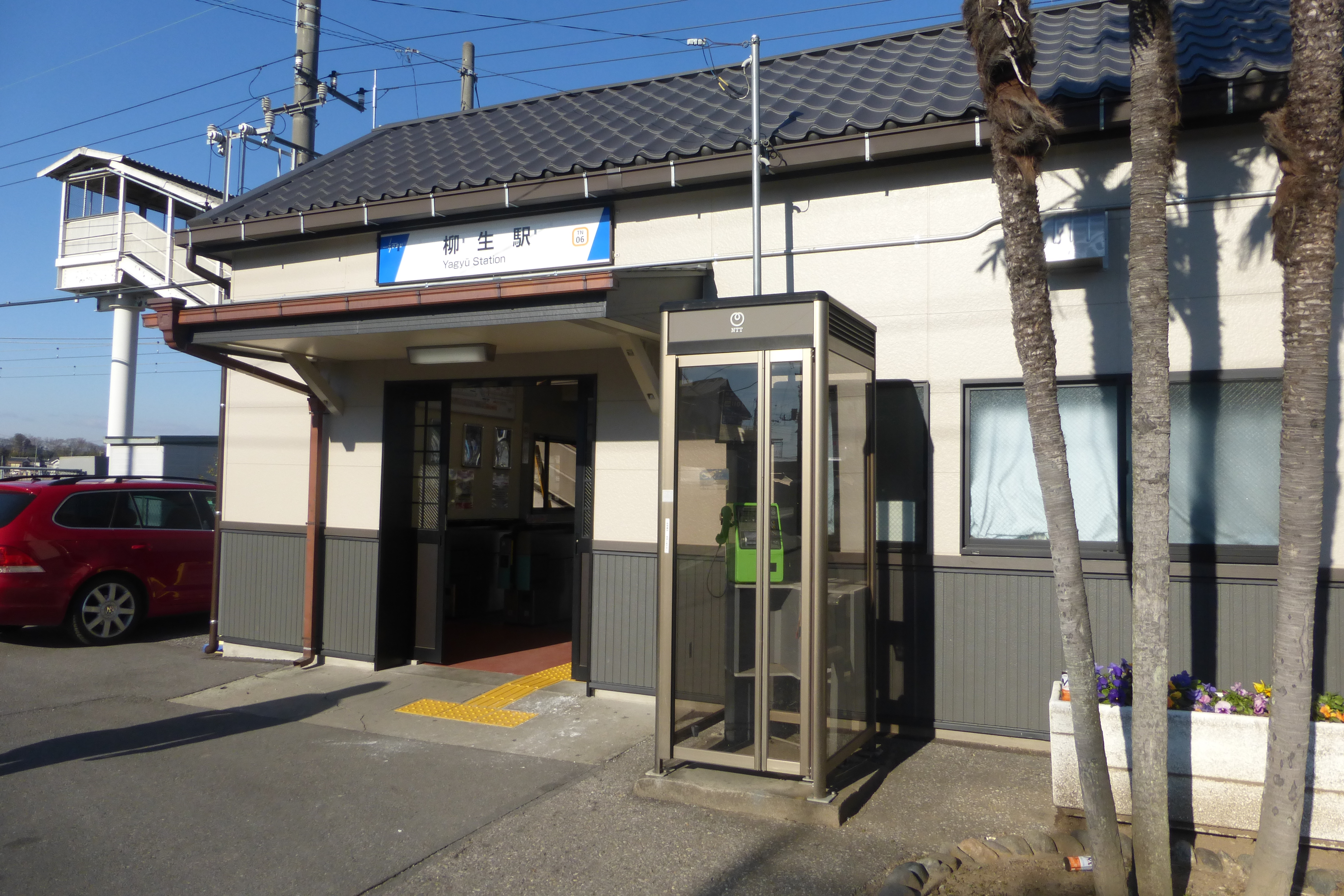
- Yagyū Station in February 2015

General information
- Location: 1834–4 Onofukuro, Kazo-shi, Saitama 349-1202; Japan
- Coordinates: 36.2070°N 139.6597°E
- Operator: Tōbu Railway
- Line: Tōbu Nikkō Line
- Distance: 23.6 km from Tōbu-Dōbutsu-Kōen
- Platforms: 2 side platforms
- Tracks: 2

Other information
- Station code: TN-06
- Website: Official website

History
- Opened: 1 November 1929

Passengers
- FY2019: 1196 daily

Services
Preceding station	Tobu Railway	Following station
Shin-Koga TN05 towards Tōbu-Dōbutsu-Kōen	Nikkō Line Local	Itakura Tōyōdai-mae TN07 towards Tōbu–Nikkō
Location
- Location within Saitama Prefecture Location within Japan

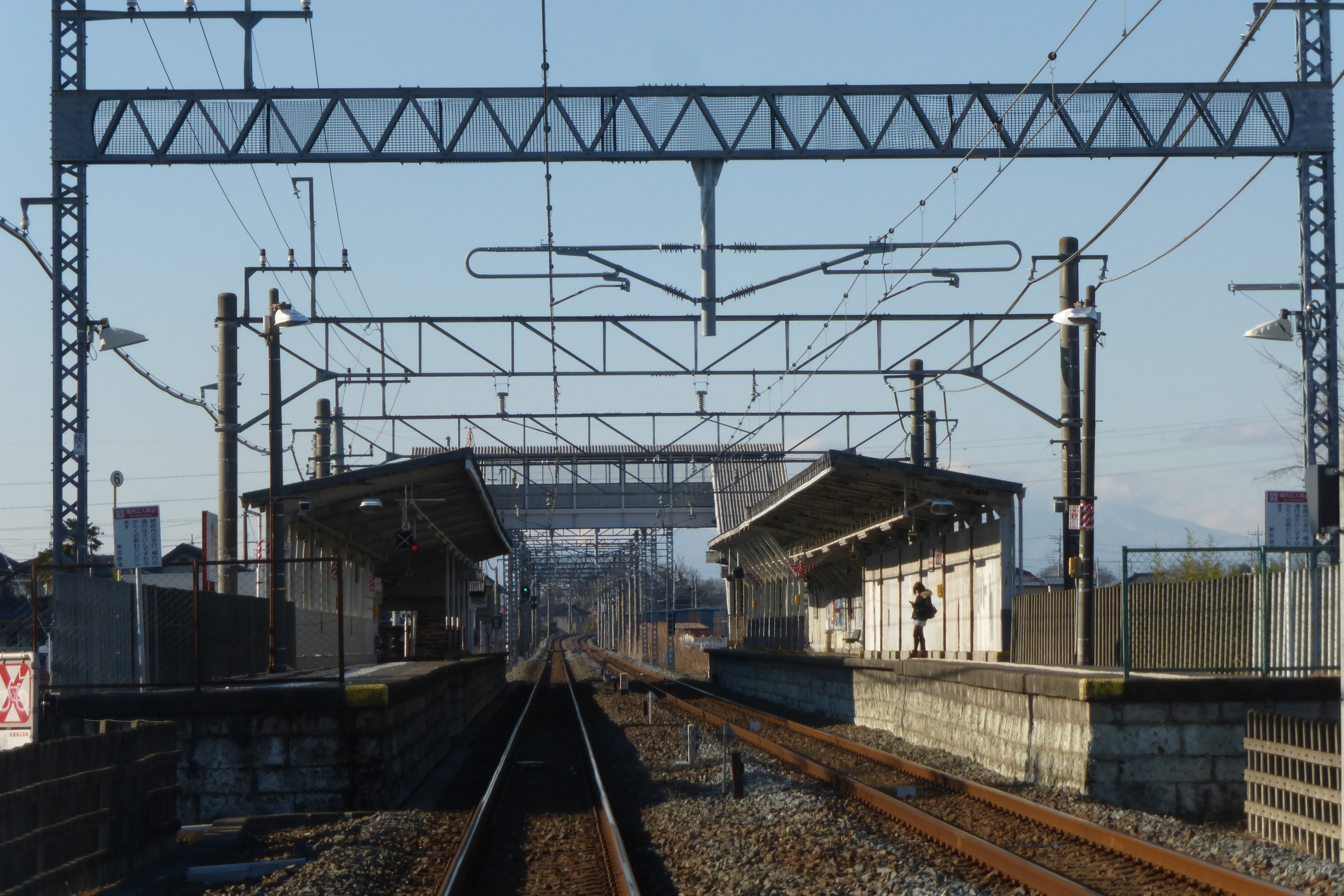
Platforms, 2015

Yagyū Station (柳生駅, Yagyū-eki) is a passenger railway station located in the city of Kazo, Saitama, Japan, operated by the private railway operator Tōbu Railway.

== Lines ==
Yagyū Station is served by the Tōbu Nikkō Line, and is 23.6 km (14.7 mi) from the starting point of the line at Tōbu-Dōbutsu-Kōen.

== Station layout ==
This station consists of two opposed side platforms serving two tracks, connected to the station building by a footbridge.

=== Platforms ===
1	■ Tōbu Nikkō Line	for Tōbu-Dōbutsu-Kōen , Kita-Senju and Asakusa
2	■ Tōbu Nikkō Line	for Tochigi, Shin-Tochigi, and Tōbu Nikkō

== History ==
Yagyū Station opened on 1 November 1929.

From 17 March 2012, station numbering was introduced on all Tōbu lines, with Yagyū Station becoming "TN-06".

== Passenger statistics ==
In fiscal 2019, the station was used by an average of 1196 passengers daily (boarding passengers only).

== Surrounding area ==
- Kitakawabe Post Office
- National Route 354

== See also ==
- List of railway stations in Japan
- Tochigi–Gunma–Saitama border
