= Nippon Institute of Technology =

Private university in Saitama, Japan

Coordinates: 36°01′37″N 139°42′49″E

- 日本工業大学
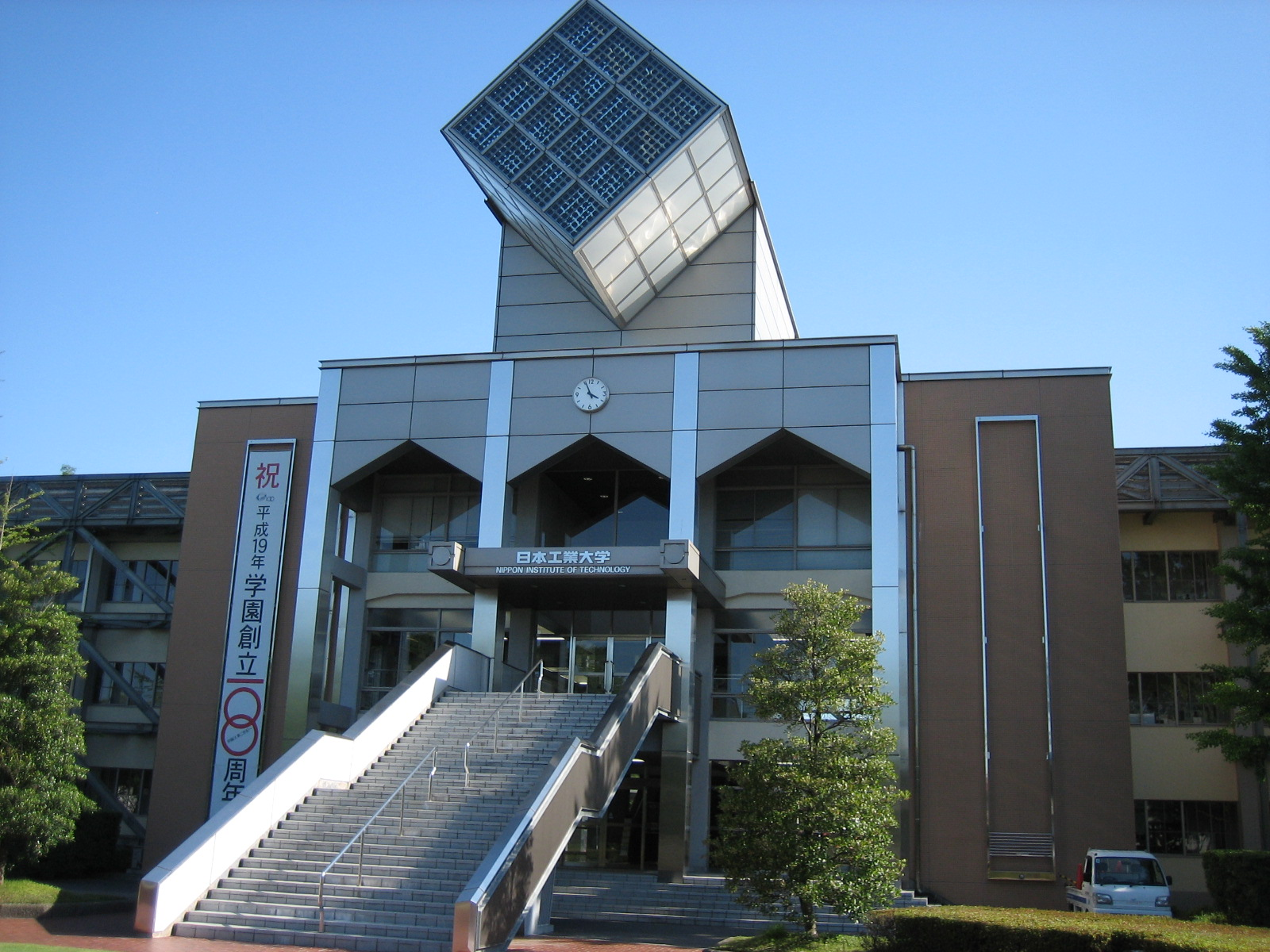
- Type: Private
- Established: 1907, chartered as a university in 1967
- Location: Miyashiro, Saitama, Japan
- Website: Official website (in Japanese)

Nippon Institute of Technology (日本工業大学, Nippon Kōgyō Daigaku) is a private university in Miyashiro, Saitama, Japan, established in 1967.

== History ==
The Nippon Institute of Technology opened in 1907 as "Tokyo Engineering School". It was renamed "Tokyo Advanced Engineering School" in 1935, but was closed in 1943 due to World War II. In 1947, it reopened as "Toko Gakuen Junior High School" which became "Tokyo Industrial High School" in 1948 and the Nippon Institute of Technology in 1967.

At the time, it had departments of Mechanical Engineering, Electrical Engineering, and Architecture. A Department of Systems Engineering was added in 1975. In 1982, Nippon Institute of Technology established a graduate school offering master's degrees, followed by doctoral degrees from 1987. A Department of Computer and Information Engineering was established in 1995. The school marked its centennial in 2007.

The Nippon Institute of Technology synthesized a diamond via the open atmosphere combustion flame method in 1988.

== See also ==
- Colleges of technology in Japan
