= Kemono Friends =

Japanese media franchise

- Anime season 1 key visual (clockwise from back to front) Rocker, Emperor, Princess, Gean, Hululu, Serval, Fennec, Raccoon
- Created by: Kemono Friends Project
- Original work: Kemono Friends (2015)
- Years: 2015-present

Print publications
- Comics: Kemono Friends: Welcome to Japari Park! Kemono Friends: À La Carte; Kemono Friends 2

Films and television
- Television series: Kemono Friends (2017); Kemono Friends 2 (2019)
- Web series: Welcome to the Japari Park (2018-2020); KemoV (2021-present); Chokotto Anime Kemono Friends 3 (2019-2021)

Games
- Video games: Kemono Friends (2015); Kemono Friends Pavilion (2018); Kemono Friends Puzzle Puzzle Gokko (2018); Kemono Friends Picross (2018); Kemono Friends Festival (2018); Kemono Friends 3 (2019); Kemono Friends Kingdom (2022); Pachislot Kemono Friends (2022)

Kemono Friends (Japanese: けものフレンズ, Hepburn: Kemono Furenzu; "Beast Friends") is a Japanese video game series and media franchise created by Kemono Friends Project. The project was launched around 2014 by Kadokawa's Kajii Hitoshi. Manga artist Mine Yoshizaki was appointed as the concept designer for the characters and worldview. The first project was a mobile game developed by Nexon, which ran from March 2015 to December 2016. A manga by Furai was serialized in Kadokawa's Monthly Shōnen Ace from May 2015 to March 2017. A second game of the series was released by Bushiroad in January 2018. An anime television series produced by Yaoyorozu aired from January to March 2017. A second season by Tomason aired from January to April 2019.

== Plot ==
Japari Park is a large zoo, filled with extant, endangered, extinct, cryptids species, and some legendary creatures. Due to a mysterious substance known as "Sandstar", many animals have become anthropomorphized into girls known as Friends (フレンズ, Furenzu).

The manga Kemono Friends: Welcome to Japari Park! follows a park keeper named Nana who looks after the various characters in Japari Park. The manga is set earlier than the rest of the works in the franchise.

In the Nexon mobile game, the park has been closed to visitors due to an outbreak of aggressive and amorphous creatures known as "Ceruleans", which the Friends have to battle with the help of the player and the park guide, Mirai.

In the first season of the anime, which is set sometime after the mobile game, a girl wakes up in Japari Park with no recollection of who she is or how she got there. She encounters a serval Friend, who names the girl "Kaban". Together, they set out on an adventure to find out what kind of animal Kaban is, passing through multiple regions of Japari Park and meeting new friends along the way.

== Characters ==
=== Kemono Friends ===
==== Main characters ====
Kaban (かばん; lit. Bag)
Voiced by: Aya Uchida (Japanese); Suzie Yeung (English)
The main protagonist of the anime series. She is a young girl who finds herself in Japari Park with no memory of who she is or where she is from. Her name was given to her by Serval due to the backpack she carries. Shy yet resourceful, she travels through Japari Park along with Serval to find out her identity while encountering more Friends along the way, eventually discovering that she is a human. She is the only character with whom Lucky Beast will directly communicate. In Kemono Friends 2, she reappears as an adult, working alongside the owls to research the phenomenon of Ceruleans.
Serval (サーバル, Sābaru)
Voiced by: Yuka Ozaki (Japanese); Dani Chambers (English)
A serval cat that was originally from the Savannah Area of Japari Park. She is the first friend to meet Kaban, eager to join her in the search for her identity. Energetic and curious, Serval is often amazed by the skills and talents of Kaban and the Friends they encounter on their journey. She reappears as a main character in Kemono Friends 2, though appears to have lost her memory of her time with Kaban.

=== Key Friends ===
Fennec (フェネック, Fenekku)
Voiced by: Kana Motomiya (Japanese); Alexis Tipton (English)
A fennec fox who accompanies Raccoon as she pursues Kaban and Serval. She also appears in the original mobile game with a similar role.
Raccoon (アライグマ, Araiguma)
Voiced by: Saki Ono (Japanese); Madeleine Morris (English)
A raccoon who is chasing after Kaban and Serval, believing that she stole something from her. In the Japanese version, she calls herself "Arai-san" instead of using the first-person pronoun. She also appears in the original mobile game with a similar role.
PPP (PENGUINS Performance Project) (ペパプ（ペンギン・パフォーマンス・プロジェクト）, PePaPu (Pengin pafōmansu purojekuto))
Voiced by: Mikoi Sasaki (Princess), Ruka Nemoto (Emperor), Kyoka Tamura (Gentoo), Aina Aiba (Rocker), Ikuko Chikuta (Hululu) (Japanese); Amanda Lee (Princess), Dawn M. Bennett (Emperor), Megan Shipman (Gentoo), Morgan Berry (Rocker), Kayli Mills (Hululu) (English)
An all-penguin idol group, consisting of Princess (プリンセス, Purinsesu), a royal penguin; Emperor (コウテイ, Kōtei), an emperor penguin; Gean (ジェーン, Jēn), a gentoo penguin; Rocker (イワビー, Iwabī), a rockhopper penguin; and Hululu (フルル, Hururu), a humboldt penguin.
Ezo Red Fox (キタキツネ, Kita Kitsune) and Silver Fox (ギンキツネ, Gin Kitsune)
Voiced by: Suzuko Mimori (Japanese); Apphia Yu (English),Yuka Aisaka
A reoccurring character in the manga series. An Ezo red fox who is rather lazy and enjoys eating Japari buns.
Northern White-faced Owl (アフリカオオコノハズク, Afurika Ōkonohazuku) and Eurasian Eagle Owl (ワシミミズク, Washi Mimizuku)
Voiced by: Shiori Mikami (White Faced Owl), Akari Uehara (Eurasian Eagle Owl) (Japanese); Kimberley Anne Campbell, Bryn Apprill (English)
A northern white-faced owl and Eurasian eagle owl – respectively referred to as Professor (博士, Hakase) and Assistant (助手, Joshu) – who reside in Japari library.
Sand Cat (スナネコ, Sunaneko)
Voiced by: Miyuhan
A friend based on the Sand Cat that appears in many different pieces of Kemono Friends media. Her voice actor in the 2017 anime is also the singer for the ending theme .
Tsuchinoko (ツチノコ, Tsuchinoko)
Voiced by: Yū Kobayashi
A friend based on a Cryptid, Tsuchinoko. She has appeared in many different pieces of Kemono Friends media, most notably the Stage Plays and the 2017 anime.
Hippopotamus (カバ, Kaba)
Voiced by: Haruka Terui
A friend based on the Hippopotamus that appeared in many Kemono Friends media including the 2017 anime, Welcome To Japari Park manga and the original mobile game.
Jaguar (ジャガー, Jagā)
Voiced by: Minami Tsuda
A friend based on the Jaguar that appears in various Kemono Friends media, most notably the 2017 anime.
Asian Small-Clawed Otter (コツメカワウソ, Kotsume Kawauso)
Voiced by: Reina Kondō
An Asian Small-Clawed Otter Friend that appeared in many Kemono Friends media including the 2017 anime.
Japanese Crested Ibis (トキ, Toki)
Voiced by: Tomoko Kaneda
A Friend based on the Japanese Crested Ibis. She is infamous for being tone-deaf across many of her appearances in Kemono Friends media.
Alpaca suri (アルパカ・スリ, Arupaka suri)
Voiced by: Yukiyo Fujii

An Alpaca Friend known mostly for running the Japari Cafe in the 2017 anime.

Brown Bear (ヒグマ, Higuma)
Voiced by: Eriko Matsui

Brown Bear is a member of a group of Cerulean Hunters in her most notable appearance in the 2017 anime.

African Wild Dog (リカオン, Rikaon)
Voiced by: Rika Tachibana (Japanese); Danielle McRae (English)
African Wild Dog is a member of a group of Cerulean Hunters in her most notable appearance, the 2017 anime.

=== Kemono Friends 2 ===
Kyururu (キュルル)
Voiced by: Yui Ishikawa (Japanese)
The main protagonist of Kemono Friends 2, named after the sound of his stomach grumbling. He emerged from a mysterious laboratory in Japari Park, with his only clue home being a sketchbook.
Caracal (カラカル, Karakaru)
Voiced by: Riko Koike (Japanese)
A caracal who appears alongside Serval in Kemono Friends 2.
Giant Armadillo (オオアルマジロ, Ōarumajiro) and Giant Pangolin (オオセンザンコウ, Ōsenzankō)
Voiced by: Emily Fajardo (Armadillo), Anairis Quinones (Pangolin) (English)
A giant armadillo and giant pangolin – respectively nicknamed Arma and Sen – who work as detectives who will take on any request in exchange for food.
Greater Lophorina (カタカケフウチョウ, Katakake Fūchō) and Western Parotia (カンザシフウチョウ, Kanzashi Fūchō)
Voiced by: Mashiro Yagi and Madoka Kan (Japanese); Haven Paschall and Kate Bristol (English)
A greater lophorina and western parotia.

=== Other characters ===
Lucky Beast (ラッキービースト, Rakkī Bīsuto)
Voiced by: Aya Uchida (Note: Credited as "????" in every episode besides Episode 12, which is credited as "Mirai".) (Japanese); Suzie Yeung (English)
A small, robotic creature also referred to as "Boss" (ボス) by the Friends. While he does not respond to the Friends themselves, he will directly answer questions and statements made by Kaban, providing information on Japari Park, Friends, and needed items when trouble arises.
Mirai (ミライ)
Voiced by: Aya Uchida (Note: Credited as "????" in Episode 11.) (Japanese); Suzie Yeung (English)
A park guide who worked at Japari Park when it was still open and adores animals. During her time at the park, she recorded various reports which are played through Lucky Beast. A different Serval (Voiced by: Ai Nonaka) worked alongside Mirai when Japari Park was open.
Nana (奈々)
The main protagonist of the manga Kemono Friends: Welcome to Japari Park!. She works as a caretaker of the animal girls at Japari Park.

== Media ==
=== Video games ===
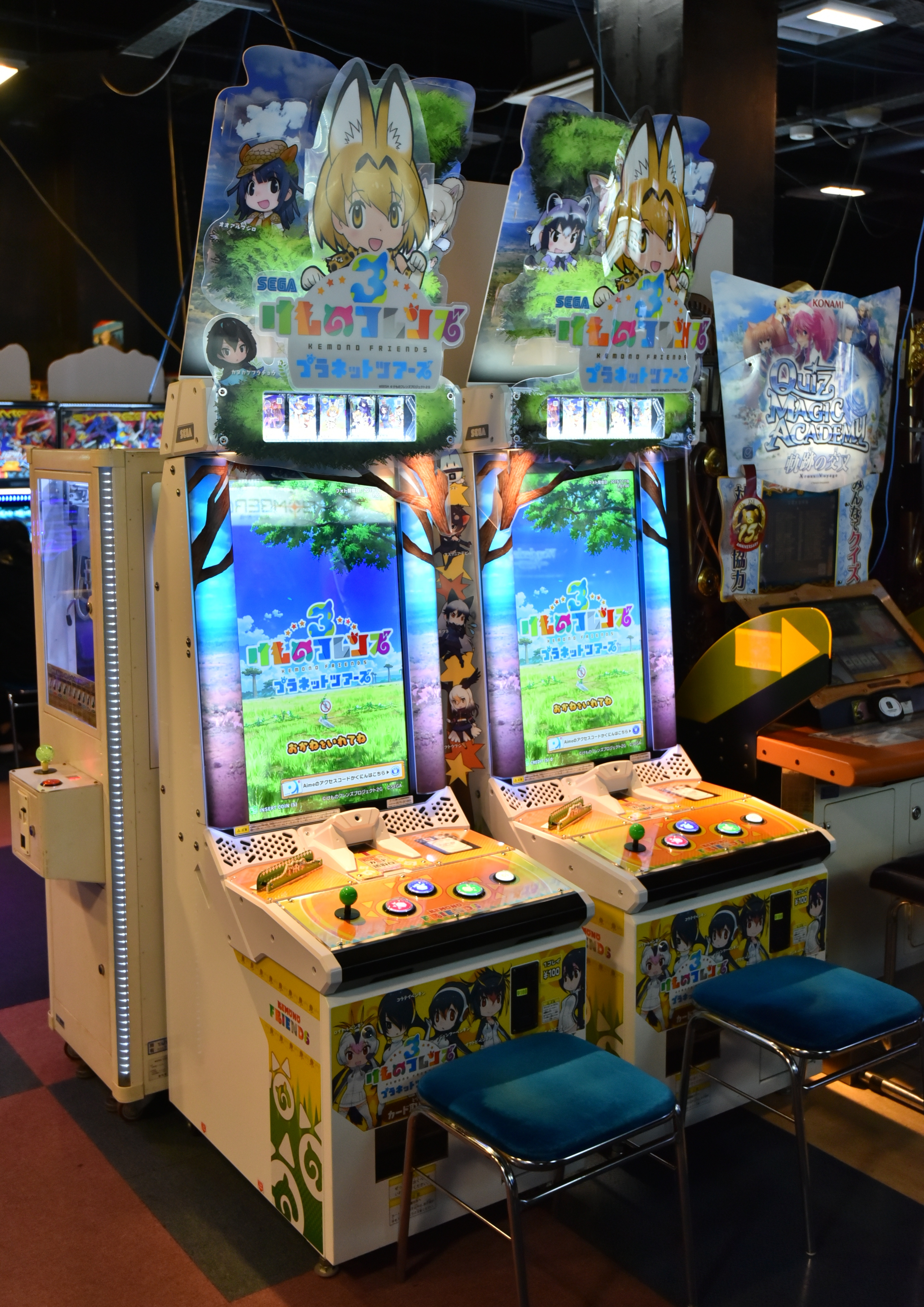
Two Kemono Friends 3 Planet Tours arcade cabinets

Nexon launched their first smartphone app in Japan in March 2015. The app shut down on December 14, 2016, which is one month before the anime's premiere. Nexon initially stated that there were no plans to restart the service despite the popularity of the anime series, although the company later announced that it is possible to relaunch, but no final decision has been made.

On April 23, a new game in development by Bushiroad was announced. On August 14, its name was revealed to be Kemono Friends Pavilion (Japanese: けものフレンズぱびりおん, Hepburn: Kemono Furenzu Pabirion), and will be a simulation game. Originally meant to be released in late 2017, the release date was pushed back to January 26, 2018.

Kemono Friends Picross, a nonogram game developed by Jupiter for their Picross series, was released internationally for Nintendo Switch on October 4, 2018.

The third smartphone app Kemono Friends 3, by Sega launched in Japan on 24 September 2019. Sega later transferred the publishing rights to Appirits. The arcade version Kemono Friends 3 Planet Tours was launched on 26 September 2019 and shut down on 30 September 2021.

On April 16, 2020, Nexon launched a crossover event, Kemono Friends × Mabinogi.

On may 5, 2022 a Pachislot game developed by Rodeo and published by Sammy titled Pachislot Kemono Friends was released. The game featured a collaboration with the Beast King Pachislot series featuring Friends based on some of the animal characters from Beast King such as Beast King Hippopotamus and Beast King Lion.

On May 31, 2022, an officially-licensed mobile RPG developed by Chinese game developer ZLONGAME- titled Kemono Friends Kingdom- was launched on servers for the Singapore/Malaysia region, the game language being Simplified Chinese. Servers for mainland China and Hong Kong/Macau/Taiwan would launch soon after; however, all Asian servers would close on April 14, 2023, preceding an announcement on May 12, 2023, that the game would be receiving a global release. Shortly thereafter, in the same year, select regions would have access to three beta tests through the Google Play Store, occurring from May 18 to May 31, June 9 to June 21, and June 28 to July 3, respectively. On July 13, 2023, an open beta launched for iOS and Android devices. In the summer of 2025, Teravit had a collab with Kemono Friends introducing Terafit x Kemono Friends.

=== Manga ===
A manga illustrated by Fly, titled Kemono Friends: Welcome to Japari Park! (けものフレンズ ようこそジャパリパークへ!, Kemono Furenzu: Yōkoso Japari Park e!), began serialization in Kadokawa Shoten's Shōnen Ace magazine from May 2015. The first tankōbon volume was released on December 26, 2016. At their panel in Anime Expo, Yen Press announced their license to the manga. In April 2018, Tokyopop released the German version of the manga on July 26, 2018.

Another manga series, Kemono Friends: À La Carte, which began serialization in 2017, was licensed by Yen Press in 2019. It is an anthology series, compiling stories and illustrations by various artists, with the second volume at one point being the highest selling book on Amazon Japan in August 2017.

A manga adaptation of Kemono Friends 2 began serialization in Monthly Shōnen Ace on January 26, 2019.

=== Anime ===
The anime television series, produced by Yaoyorozu, aired in Japan between January 10, 2017, and March 28, 2017; and was co-produced, financed and streamed simultaneously by Crunchyroll. The opening theme is "Yōkoso Japari Park e" (ようこそジャパリパークへ, Welcome to Japari Park) by Dōbutsu Biscuits×PPP, while the ending theme is "Boku no Friend" (ぼくのフレンド, My Friend) by Mewhan. Original content for TV Tokyo's AniTele service was released from April 1, 2017. An unofficial "episode 12.1" 2-minute short was uploaded by the director to Niconico and YouTube on April 5, 2017. Additional shorts have been created in collaboration with Japan Racing Association, Animelo Summer Live 2017, and Nissin Foods. Discotek Media distributed the series for Crunchyroll in North America, and produced an English dub by Sound Cadence Studios. The full English dub cast had been announced at Otakon 2019, and released on Blu-ray on September 24, 2019. The anime gained additional worldwide attention in 2017 due to coverage of the unusual story of Grape-kun, a Humboldt penguin at the Saitama Tobu Zoo that developed a romantic attraction to a cardboard cutout of the character Hululu.

A second anime season was announced to be greenlit for production on July 26, 2017, and was officially confirmed on September 2, 2018. The second season is animated by Tomason, with Ryuichi Kimura and Takuya Matsumoto replacing Tatsuki as director and writer, respectively. The rest of the cast and staff reprised their roles. The second season aired from January 14 to April 1, 2019. The opening theme is "Notteke~ Japari Beat," by Dōbutsu Biscuits×PPP. The ending theme from episodes 1–5 is "Hoshi o Tsunagete" by Gothic×Luck. From episode 6-onwards, Gothic×Luck performed the series' second ending theme "Kimi wa Kaeru Basho." A short anime titled Kemono Friends 3 has been greenlit for production.

An original net animation mini-series based on the original mobile game, titled Welcome to the Japari Park (ようこそジャパリパーク, Yōkoso Japari Pāku), began streaming on TV Tokyo's AnimeTele service from August 10, 2018. Crunchyroll began streaming the series from October 16, 2018.

=== Stage play ===
A stage play adaptation of Kemono Friends with an original storyline ran at the Shinagawa Prince Hotel Club eX in Tokyo from 2017 June 14 to 18. Hiroki Murakami directed the play and penned the script while some of the characters were portrayed by the same actors who voiced them in the anime series. It ran again in 2018 from January 13 to 21.

=== VTuber project ===
A VTuber project titled Kemono Friends V Project, KemoV for short, was launched on YouTube on April 26, 2021. The project currently has 9 active members, each based on characters and designs from the Kemono Friends franchise.

== Reception ==
=== Anime ===
==== Season one ====
Initial criticism often latched onto the quality and style of the CGI animation. Critic Hiroki Azuma reported on Twitter that he stopped watching partway through the first episode. However, its popularity increased explosively after the release of the fourth episode. In reference to the simplistic and repetitive nature of the show, it has been described by critical bloggers as "causing one's IQ to melt" and "lowering one's intelligence". Despite its low production quality, the anime series earned praise from critics and viewers in Japan due to the storyline and characters, becoming a fad in the country. Nick Creamer of Anime News Network gave the series an overall grade of B, praising the worldbuilding and criticizing the visual aspects. The Encyclopedia of Science Fiction described the first season of Kemono Friends as a charming and unexpectedly successful anime, noting that its primitive computer-generated animation and origins as a promotional adaptation of an unsuccessful mobile game contrasted with its considerable popularity. It praised the endearing characters, warm humor and thoughtful worldbuilding, particularly the gradual revelation of a possibly post-apocalyptic setting through abandoned human artifacts. The encyclopedia also highlighted the series' educational value and generally accurate portrayal of animal characteristics, humorously comparing its premise of animals transformed into humanlike beings to a child-friendly version of H. G. Wells's The Island of Doctor Moreau (1896).

Multiple phrases and exclamations from the anime became popular keywords on Twitter; Kemono Friends-related phrases have been tweeted by the accounts of Sharp and Warner Bros. Japan.

The first episode of Kemono Friends quickly surpassed the first episode of Is the Order a Rabbit? (9 million views as of September 2017; uploaded on April 16, 2014) as well as other popular shows like Attack on Titan in total views on NicoNico Douga. By February 5, it had surpassed 1 million views, by April 4, it had surpassed 5 million views, and by August 24, it had reached a record-breaking 10 million views.

The week after episode 12 and around the time episodes would normally air, demand for an episode 13 reached Twitter's international trends list, and the episode 12.1 short that was uploaded that day (April 5) had reached over 1 million views on both Niconico and YouTube by April 7.

The opening theme song "Yokoso Japari Park e" rose to 3rd place in the iTunes charts upon release. It was revealed on May 20 that "Yokoso Japari Park e" had reached gold status (sales of 100,000+ in Japan). Gen Hoshino has expressed high praise of the song. Hisashi, guitarist of the band Glay, was inspired to create a guitar arrangement of the opening theme song after watching episode 11.

Multiple other Kemono Friends merchandise topped Amazon rankings upon announcement. The unexpected popularity of the show created a shortage in supply and reservations had to be placed on backorder.

==== Season two ====
Season two was received with mixed-to-poor reaction among Japanese audiences. The anime was criticized for foreshadowed plot points being left unresolved and a "perceived malice towards season 1" of Kemono Friends, an opinion compounded by controversies surrounding Kemono Friends 2. Episode 9 and 12 was particularly poorly received due to its contents, with the latter breaking the record of the least positively rated anime episode on NicoNico Namahousou at 2.6%, surpassing the previously held record of 2.8% by Yu-Gi-Oh! Arc-V's 148th episode. Despite the negative reactions, first episode reactions were generally positive, and some viewers liked both seasons. The Encyclopedia of Science Fiction, which praised the first season, considered the second, which effectively rebooted the story with a different human protagonist, pleasant but forgettable. It also noted the controversy surrounding the dismissal of the first season's director, Tatsuki, despite the show's success.

Gadget Tsūshin listed both the ninth episode's title and ass-kissing shit bird (ゴマすりクソバード, Gomasuri Kuso Bādo), a fan name referring to Roadrunner) in their 2019 anime buzzwords list.

=== Awards and nominations ===
Year	Award	Category	Recipient	Result	Ref.
2018	2nd Crunchyroll Anime Awards	Best Girl	Serval	Nominated	
2018	2nd Crunchyroll Anime Awards	Best Slice of Life	Kemono Friends	Nominated	
2018	Tokyo Anime Award Festival	Animation of the Year (Television)	Kemono Friends	Won	
2018	49th Seiun Awards	Best Dramatic Presentation	Kemono Friends	Won	

== Controversies ==
=== Dispute between Kadokawa and Yaoyorozu ===
On September 25, 2017, the director of the anime, Tatsuki, revealed on Twitter that Kadokawa had decided to replace him for the production of the second season. Fan response included immense condemnation of Kadokawa and widespread support of Tatsuki, as Tatsuki is regarded as being a highly instrumental part of the anime's charm and success. Fans left angry comments en masse towards Kadokawa on Niconico Douga's stream of the first episode, with some declaring that they would cancel their Niconico Douga premium membership with the service in response to Tatsuki's firing, as Dwango [Niconico's owner] and Kadokawa are both child companies of Kadokawa Dwango. The Nikkei reported that stock prices for Kadokawa Dwango fell by 3.3% compared to the previous day at the Tokyo Stock Exchange as a result of the news. In the weeks before this incident, animation studio Yaoyorozu had released a free teaser side episode to its fans, pursuant to their agreement with Kadokawa that Yaoyorozu would be allowed full creative freedom in developing Kemono Friends, an agreement made at a time where the Kemono Friends IP appeared to be near worthless, an agreement they wished to change in response to the soaring value of the IP. In response to the controversy, production committee of the Kemono Friends anime announced that director Tatsuki and the animation studio Yaoyorozu had been using the Kemono Friends property on its own without consulting all concerned parties and that Yaoyorozu would not agree to a normalization in communication and withdrew from the project as a result. A September 26 Kemono Friends streaming program on Niconico Douga then featured several voice actresses from the anime publicly apologizing for the ongoing controversy, despite having little connection to the corporate decisions made. This led to further backlash against Kadokawa, with accusations that they had used the actresses to deflect blame from the company itself.

On December 27, 2017, Yoshitada Fukuhara, the animation producer, confirmed that Yaoyorozu would ultimately not go on to produce the second season.

Tatsuki has also claimed on Twitter on September 14, 2018, that he was never paid for his involvement with writing the script, or any of the royalties concerning the anime. TV Tokyo's producer for this anime, Nobuyuki Hosoda, responded to fan questions on Twitter stating that he couldn't provide an answer based on the position that he was in.

=== Anime setting and drawing plagiarism allegations ===
Concerns rose among Internet users on February 2, 2018, that the then-upcoming game, Kemono Friends Puzzle Gokko, was plagiarizing artwork and setting from the first season of the anime without the consent of Tatsuki. Yoshitada Fukuhara weighed in on this as well, stating that he was never informed of this matter and that he would look in to it. Three weeks later, both the Kemono Friends official Twitter account and later on a press release by the developer of Puzzle Gokko issued an apology for the troubles caused and that any legal issues surrounding such issues were resolved.

=== Audition script plagiarism controversy ===
On September 2, 2018, the second season of Kemono Friends was once again announced on their official website and casting calls were published for a new idol unit related to the show. However, it was quickly revealed by the owner of a website called Mezasou! Seiyu that the sample script for the upcoming audition was lifted from the website without the required proper crediting. The offending script was taken down the following day, and Eiji Kato, one of the producers of Kemono Friends, offered an apology on Twitter and offered to also apologize to the website owner in person but was turned down.

=== Season 2 producer social media controversy ===
After the end of the second season, TV Tokyo released an apology statement in regards to a staff member's behavior on social media and their behavior towards viewers. This apology was thought to be about Nobuyuki Hosoya, a producer of both seasons of the show, and later confirmed to be about him by TV Tokyo's Yukio Kawasaki. Hosoya had been accused of making taunting and agitating comments towards critics of Kemono Friends 2 on Twitter and making fun of their comments. Hosoya admitted to his actions being inappropriate. Hosoya was later transferred completely away from anime related work by TV Tokyo, and ultimately leaving TV Tokyo completely, with his name disappearing from all anime he was involved in. Although TV Tokyo claimed it was only part of a regularly planned reshuffle of personnel, he had previously only worked in anime-related work.

=== Legal concerns over Blu-ray purchase benefits ===
Concerns of misrepresentation were raised by fans on promotional materials for the official Blu-ray discs of Kemono Friends 2. Consumers pointed out that no mentions were made to the fact that the "purchase benefit" listed on promotional materials failed to make mention of the fact that an additional commission was required to apply for such benefits via postal money order, leading to complaints and concerns over whether the production committee breached the "Act against Unjustifiable Premiums and Misleading Representations" (不当景品類及び不当表示防止法). KADOKAWA issued an apology and correction statement on June 7, 2019, on the official website of Kemono Friends 2, stating that the benefits will be free and that anyone who already paid in would be refunded.
