= Kita-Katsushika District =

District in Saitama prefecture, Japan

Coordinates: 36.010°N 139.769°E

Kita-Katsushika (北葛飾郡, Kita-Katsushika-gun) is a district located in Saitama Prefecture, Japan.

As of July 1, 2011, the district has an estimated population of 77,583 and a population density of 1,680 persons per km^{2}. The total area is 46.22 km^{2}.

There are two towns in the district.

- Matsubushi
- Sugito

The following cities were once part of the district, but have since merged into other towns:

- Parts of Kasukabe
- Kuki
- Misato
- Satte
- Yoshikawa

== History ==
- April 1, 1964: The village of Shōwa gained town status.
- October 1, 1964: The village of Misato gained town status.
- April 1, 1969: The village of Matsubushi gained town status.
- May 3, 1972: The town of Misato gained city status.
- October 1, 1986: The town of Satte gained city status.
- April 1, 1996: The town of Yoshikawa gained city status.
- October 1, 2005: The town of Shōwa merged with the city of Kasukabe to form the new city of Kasukabe.
- March 23, 2010: The towns of Kurihashi and Washimiya, along with the town of Shōbu, from Minamisaitama District, merged with the city of Kuki to form the new city of Kuki.
