= Shin-Koga Station =

Railway station in Kazo, Saitama Prefecture, Japan

TN05 Shin-Koga Station 新古河駅
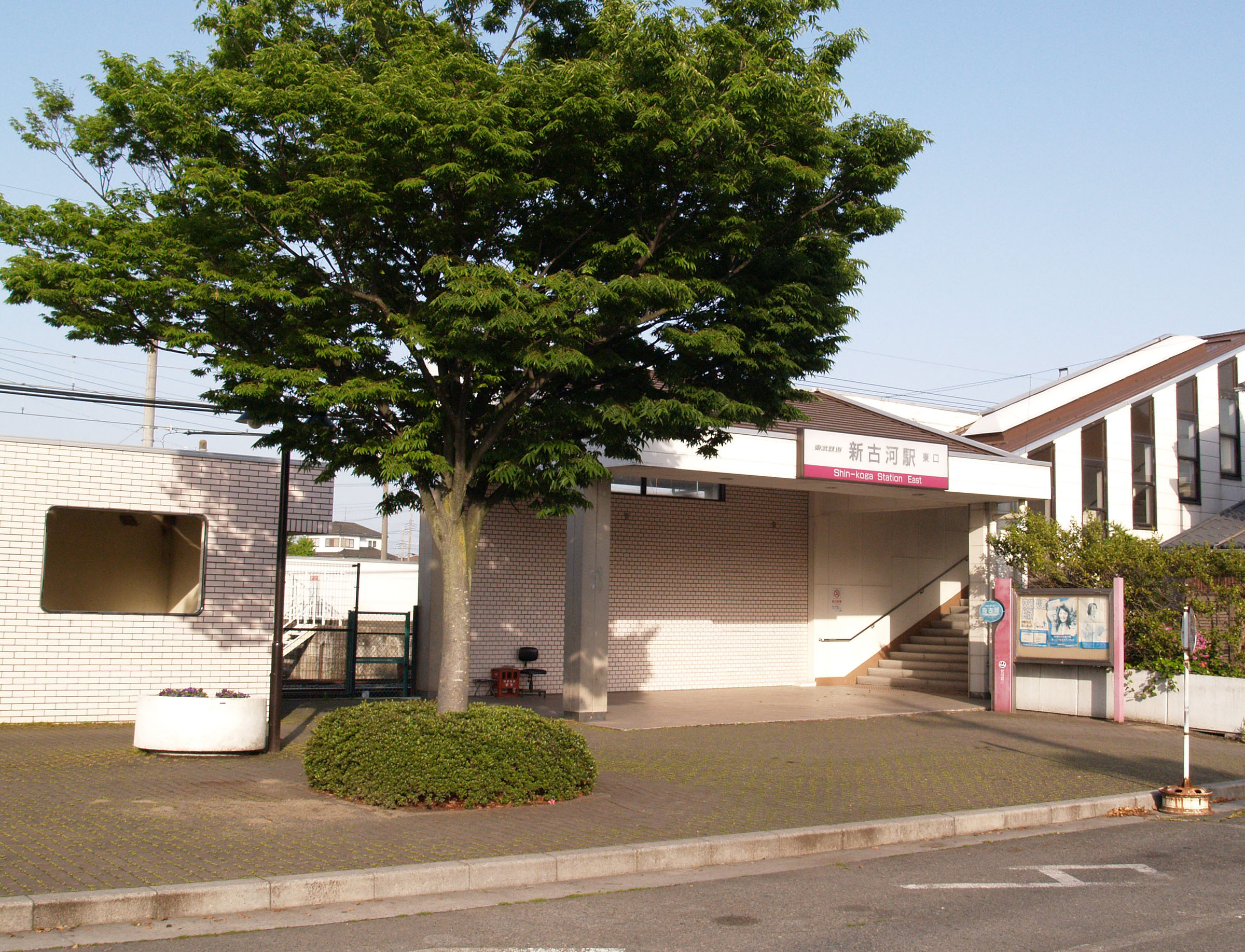
- East exit, May 2011

General information
- Location: Mukaikoga, Kazo-shi, Saitama-ken 349-1205; Japan
- Coordinates: 36.1927°N 139.6867°E
- Operator: Tōbu Railway
- Line: Tōbu Nikkō Line
- Distance: 20.6 km from Tōbu-Dōbutsu-Kōen
- Platforms: 2 side platforms

Other information
- Station code: TN-05
- Website: Official website

History
- Opened: 21 July 1935

Passengers
- FY2019: 1631 daily

Services
Preceding station	Tobu Railway	Following station
Kurihashi TN04 towards Tōbu-Dōbutsu-Kōen	Nikkō Line Local	Yagyū TN06 towards Tōbu–Nikkō
Location
- Location within Saitama Prefecture Location within Japan

Shin-Koga Station (新古河駅, Shin-Koga-eki) is a passenger railway station in located in the city of Kazo, Saitama, Japan, operated by the private railway operator Tōbu Railway.

== Lines ==
Shin-Koga Station is served by the Tōbu Nikkō Line, and is 20.6 km from the starting point of the line at Tōbu-Dōbutsu-Kōen.

== Station layout ==
This station consists of two opposed side platforms serving two tracks, connected to the station building by a footbridge.

=== Platforms ===
1	■ Tōbu Nikkō Line	for Tōbu-Dōbutsu-Kōen , Kita-Senju and Asakusa
2	■ Tōbu Nikkō Line	for Tochigi, Shin-Tochigi, and Tōbu Nikkō

== History ==
Shin-Koga Station opened on 21 July 1935.

From 17 March 2012, station numbering was introduced on all Tōbu lines, with Shin-Koga Station becoming "TN-05".

== Passenger statistics ==
In fiscal 2019, the station was used by an average of 1631 passengers daily (boarding passengers only).

== Surrounding area ==
- Koga Post Office
- Koga History Museum
- National Route 354

== See also ==
- List of railway stations in Japan
