= Minami-Saitama District =

District in Saitama prefecture, Japan

Coordinates: 36.0266°N 139.681°E

Minami-Saitama (南埼玉郡, Minami-Saitama-gun) is a district located in Saitama Prefecture, Japan.

As of 2012, the district has an estimated population of 33,405 and a density of 2,090 persons per km^{2}. The total area is 15.95 km^{2}.

== Towns and villages ==
- Miyashiro

== District timeline ==
- 1871 (first wave of prefectural mergers): The part of Saitama District that would later become Minami-Saitama becomes completely part of Saitama Prefecture which is named after the district.
- 1879 (reactivation and reorganization of ancient provincial districts as modern prefectural subdivision): Saitama District is split into North- (Kita-) and South (Minami-) Saitama, the district government of South Saitama is set up in Iwatsuki

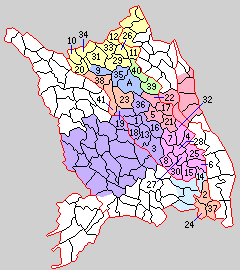
1889 administrative map of five districts in Southeastern Saitama with the municipalities (numbers) and municipal associations (chōson kumiai; letters) of South Saitama District; colours indicate current/recent (2011) municipalities. 1. represents Iwatsuki Town, the district seat. Miyashiro Town, the last remaining municipality after the Great Heisei mergers, was created in 1955 by the merger of 39. Monma Village (百間村) and 40. Suka Village (須賀村).

- 1889 (Great Meiji mergers & introduction of modern municipalities): Minami-Saitama is subdivided into 6 towns and 44 villages
- 1923: The Minami-Saitama district assembly is abolished.
- 1926: The Minami-Saitama district government is abolished, and it becomes a purely geographical unit.
- November 3, 1954
  The town of Iwatsuki gained city status.
  The town of Koshigaya was created by merging with 2 towns and 8 villages.
- January 1, 1955 - The town of Washinomiya merged with the village of Sakurada from Kitakatsushika District to form the town of Washinomiya in Kitakatsushika District.
- July 20, 1955 - The villages of Momoki and Suka merged to form the town of Miyashiro.
- August 1, 1955 - The village of Kawayanagi merged into the town of Soka in Kitaadachi District (now the city of Soka).
- November 3, 1955 - Parts of the town of Soka in Kitaadachi District merged into the town of Koshigaya.
- January 1, 1956 - Parts of the city of Iwatsuki merged into the town of Hasuda.
- September 28, 1956
  Parts of the village of Hachijo merged with the villages of Yawata and Shiodomari to form the village of Yashio.
  The remaining parts of Hachijo merged into the town of Soka in Kitaadachi District.
- November 3, 1958 - The town of Koshigaya gained city status.
- October 1, 1964 - The village of Yashio gained town status.
- October 1, 1971 - The town of Kuki gained city status.
- January 15, 1972 - The town of Yashio gained city status.
- October 1, 1972 - The town of Hasuda gained city status.
- March 23, 2010 - The town of Shōbu, along with the towns of Kurihashi and Washimiya, both from Kitakatsushika District, merged with the city of Kuki to form the new city of Kuki.
- October 1, 2012 - The town of Shiraoka gained city status. This leaves Minami Saitama District with one municipality.
