= Heisei International University =

- 平成国際大学
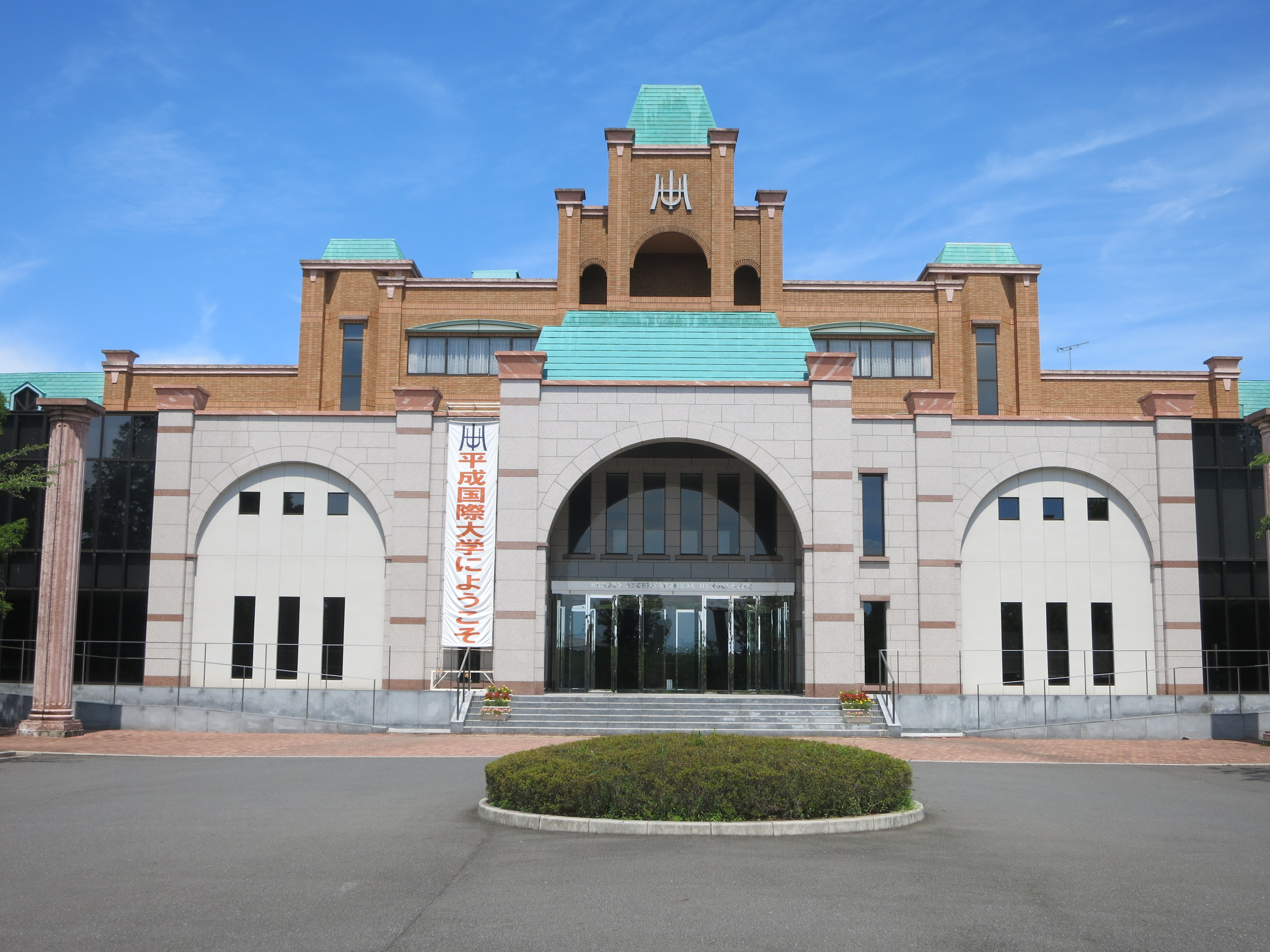
- Established: 1996
- Location: Kazo, Japan, Saitama Prefecture; 36°6′0.3″N 139°38′33.6″E
- Website: www.hiu.ac.jp

Heisei International University (平成国際大学, Heisei kokusai daigaku) is a private university in Kazo, Saitama, Japan, established in 1996.
