= Kita-Kasukabe Station =

Railway station in Kasukabe, Saitama Prefecture, Japan

TS28 Kita-Kasukabe Station 北春日部駅
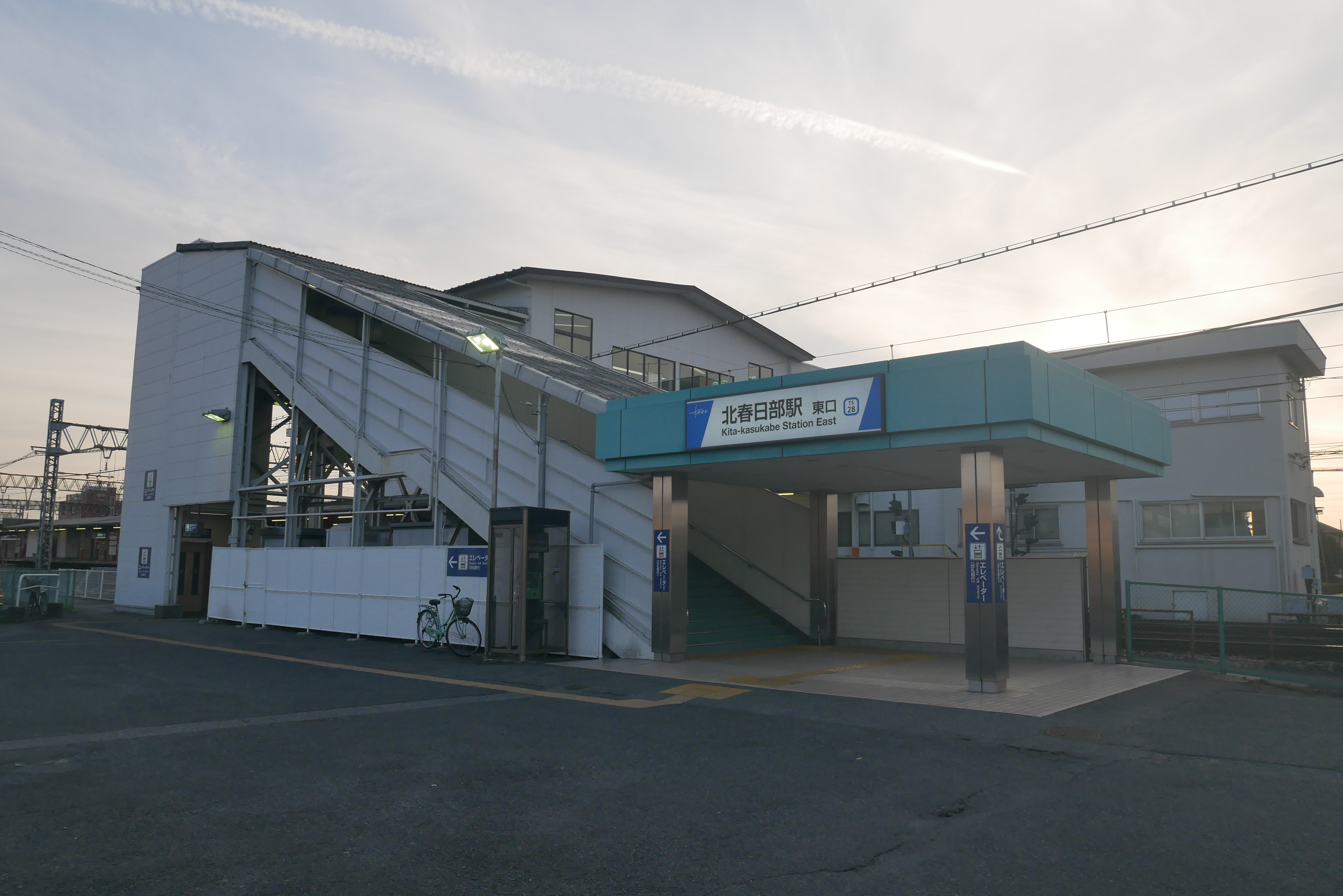
- The east exit of Kasukabe Station in November 2018

General information
- Location: 1-13-1 Umeda-honcho, Kasukabe-shi, Saitama-ken 344-0053; Japan
- Coordinates: 35.9906°N 139.7440°E
- Operator: Tōbu Railway
- Line: Tōbu Skytree Line
- Distance: 36.8 km from Asakusa
- Platforms: 1 island platform
- Tracks: 5

Other information
- Station code: TS-28
- Website: Official website

History
- Opened: 1 September 1966

Passengers
- FY2024: 4,834 daily boardings

Services
Preceding station	Tobu Railway	Following station
Kasukabe TS27 towards Oshiage	Tobu Skytree Line Semi Express	Himemiya TS29 towards Tōbu-Dōbutsu-Kōen
Kasukabe TS27 towards Asakusa	Tobu Skytree Line Section Semi Express Local	Himemiya TS29 towards Tōbu-Dōbutsu-Kōen
Location
- Location within Saitama Prefecture Location within Japan

Kita-Kasukabe Station (北春日部駅, Kita-Kasukabe-eki) is a passenger railway station located in the city of Kasukabe, Saitama, Japan, operated by the private railway operator Tōbu Railway.

== Lines ==
Kita-Kasukabe Station is served by the Tōbu Skytree Line, and is located 36.8 km from the line's Tokyo terminus at Asakusa.

== Station layout ==
The station has one island platform serving five tracks, with the platform connected to the station building by a footbridge. Track 1 is used by non-stop trains. Tracks 2 and 5 are on passing loops, with tracks 3 and 4 served by the station platform.

=== Platforms ===
3	Tōbu Skytree Line	for Kasukabe, Shin-Koshigaya, Kita-Senju, and Asakusa; Tokyo Metro Hanzomon Line for Shibuya; Tokyu Den-en-toshi Line for Chūō-rinkan; Tokyo Metro Hibiya Line for Ueno and Naka-meguro
4	Tōbu Skytree Line	for Tōbu-Dōbutsu-Kōen; Tobu Isesaki Line for Kuki; Tōbu Nikkō Line for Minami-Kurihashi

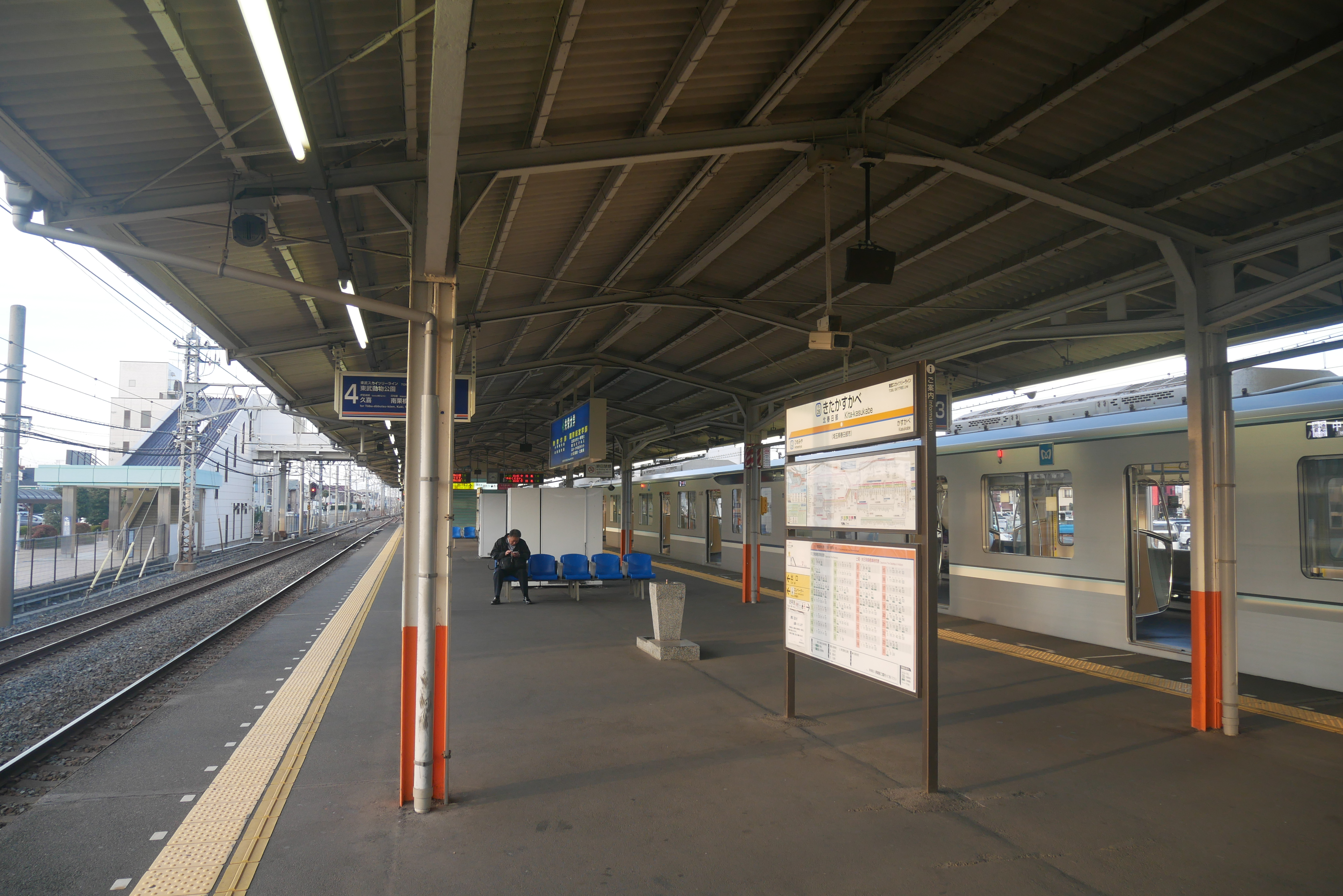
Station platforms, November 2018

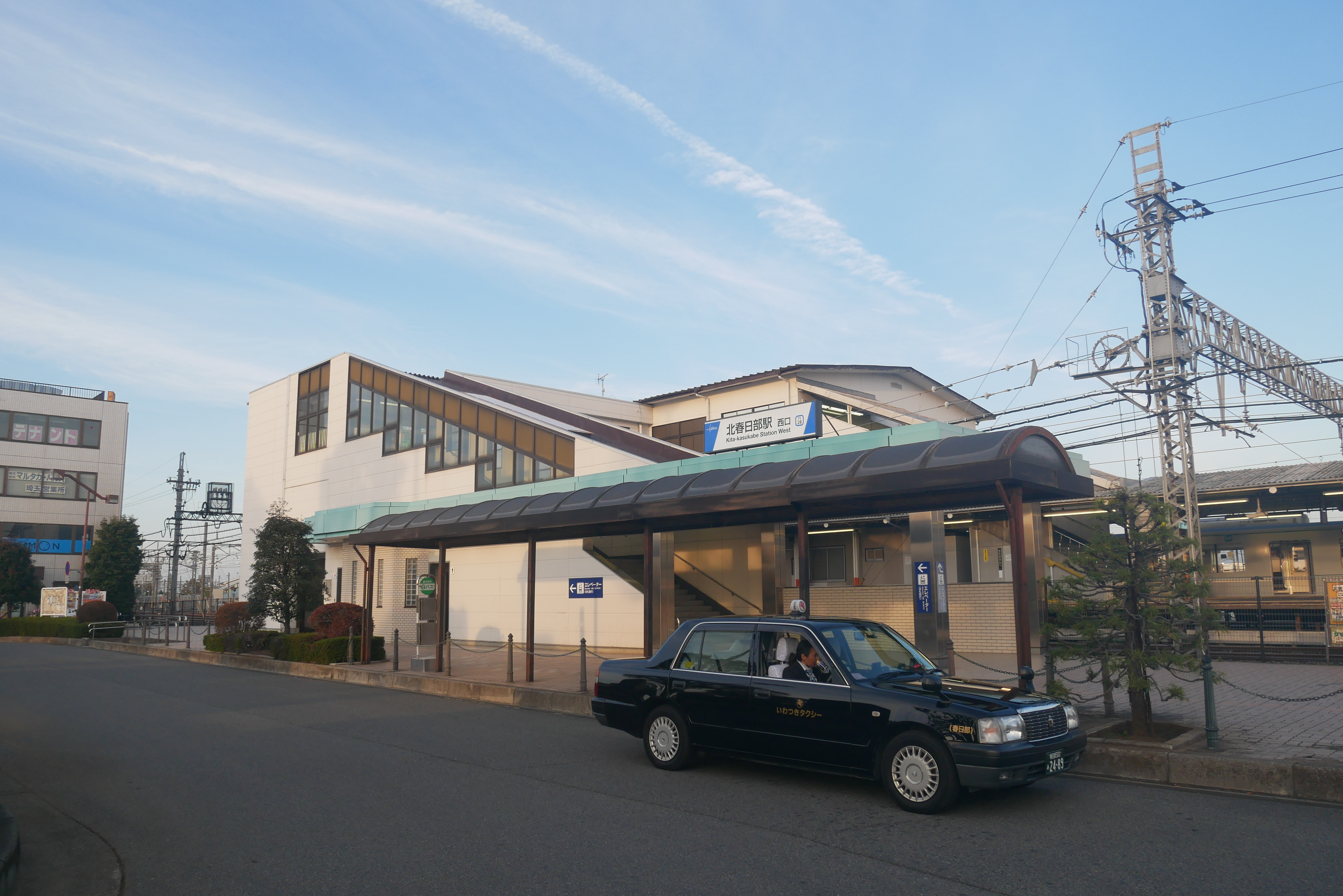
The west entrance in November 2018

== History ==
Kita-Kasukabe Station opened on 1 September 1966.

From 17 March 2012, station numbering was introduced on all Tōbu lines, with Kita-Kasukabe Station becoming "TS-28".

== Passenger statistics ==
In fiscal 2024, the station was used by an average of 4,834 passengers daily (boarding passengers only).

== Surrounding area ==
- Kyoei University
- National Route 16

== See also ==
- List of railway stations in Japan
