= Tobu Zoo =

Zoo and amusement park in Japan

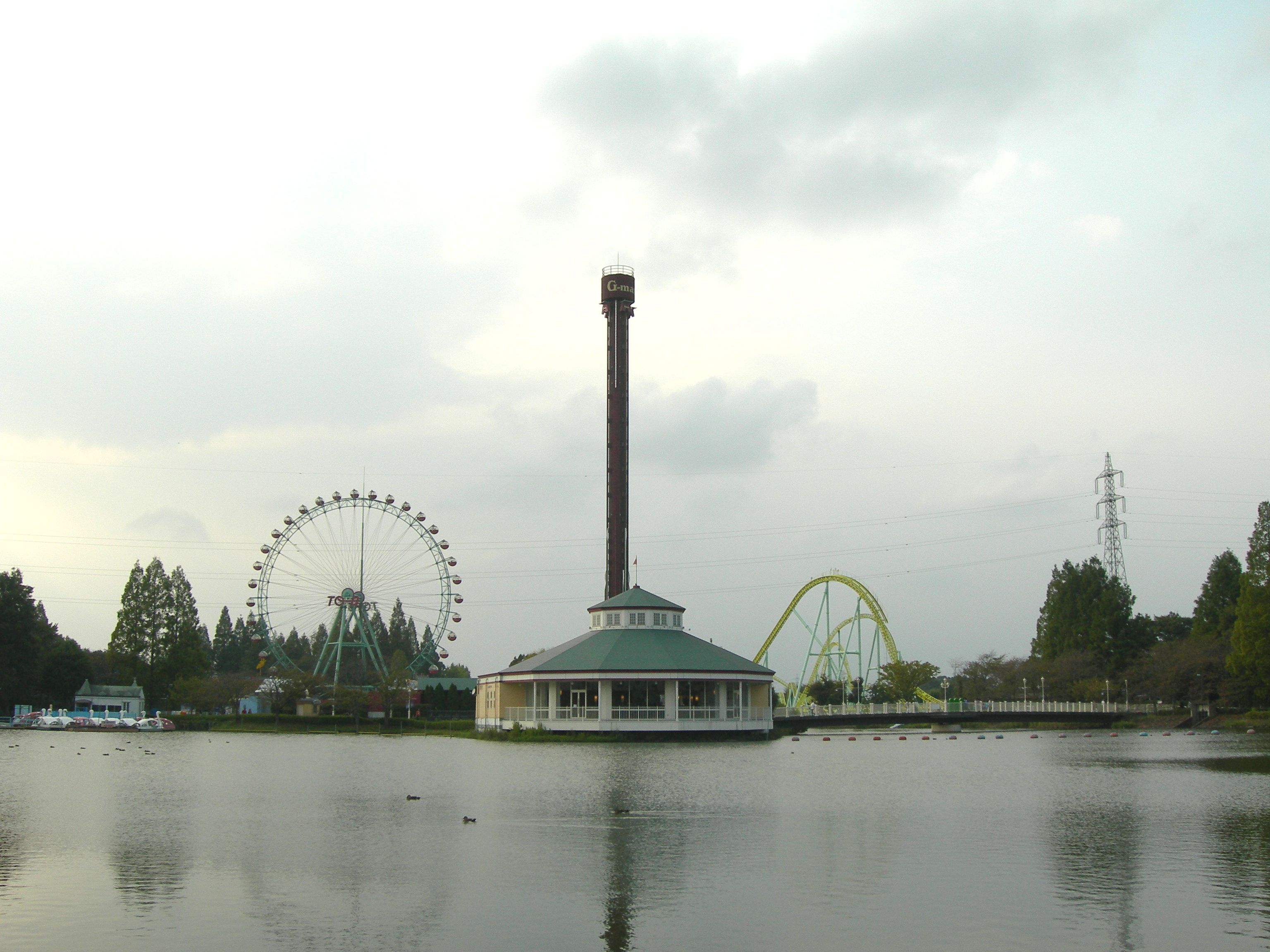
- Interactive map of Tobu Zoo
- 36.021°N 139.713°E
- Date opened: March 28, 1981
- Location: Miyashiro, Saitama Prefecture, Japan
- Owner: Tobu Railway

Tobu Zoo (東武動物公園, Tōbu dōbutsu kōen lit. '’Tōbu Zoological Park’') is a combination of a zoo and an amusement park located in Miyashiro, Saitama Prefecture, Japan, owned by Tobu Railway.

== Grape-kun ==
Grape-kun was a 21-year-old Humboldt penguin at the zoo. His attachment to a cardboard cutout of a character from Kemono Friends earned him international fame. The zoo announced his death on 12 October 2017.

== Rocky-kun ==
In promoting the 2018 movie Bungo Stray Dogs: Dead Apple, Tobu Zoo a pictures of weretiger character Atsushi Nakajima alongside white tiger known as "Rocky-kun". During the promotion of this event, Atsushi's voice actor, Yūto Uemura, collaborated in making multiple announcement which was run between February 24 and March 3, 2018.

== Roller coasters ==
- Kawasemi
- Regina II
- Tentomushi
- Diggy & Daggy's Tram Coaster

== Access ==
The zoo is located a 10-minute walk or 5-minute shuttle bus ride from Tōbu-Dōbutsu-Kōen Station (lit. '’Tōbu Zoological Park Station’'), a junction station on the Tōbu Skytree, Tobu Isesaki and Tōbu Nikko Lines.

== See also ==
- Animal theme park
