= Grape-kun =

Japanese Humboldt penguin (1996–2017)

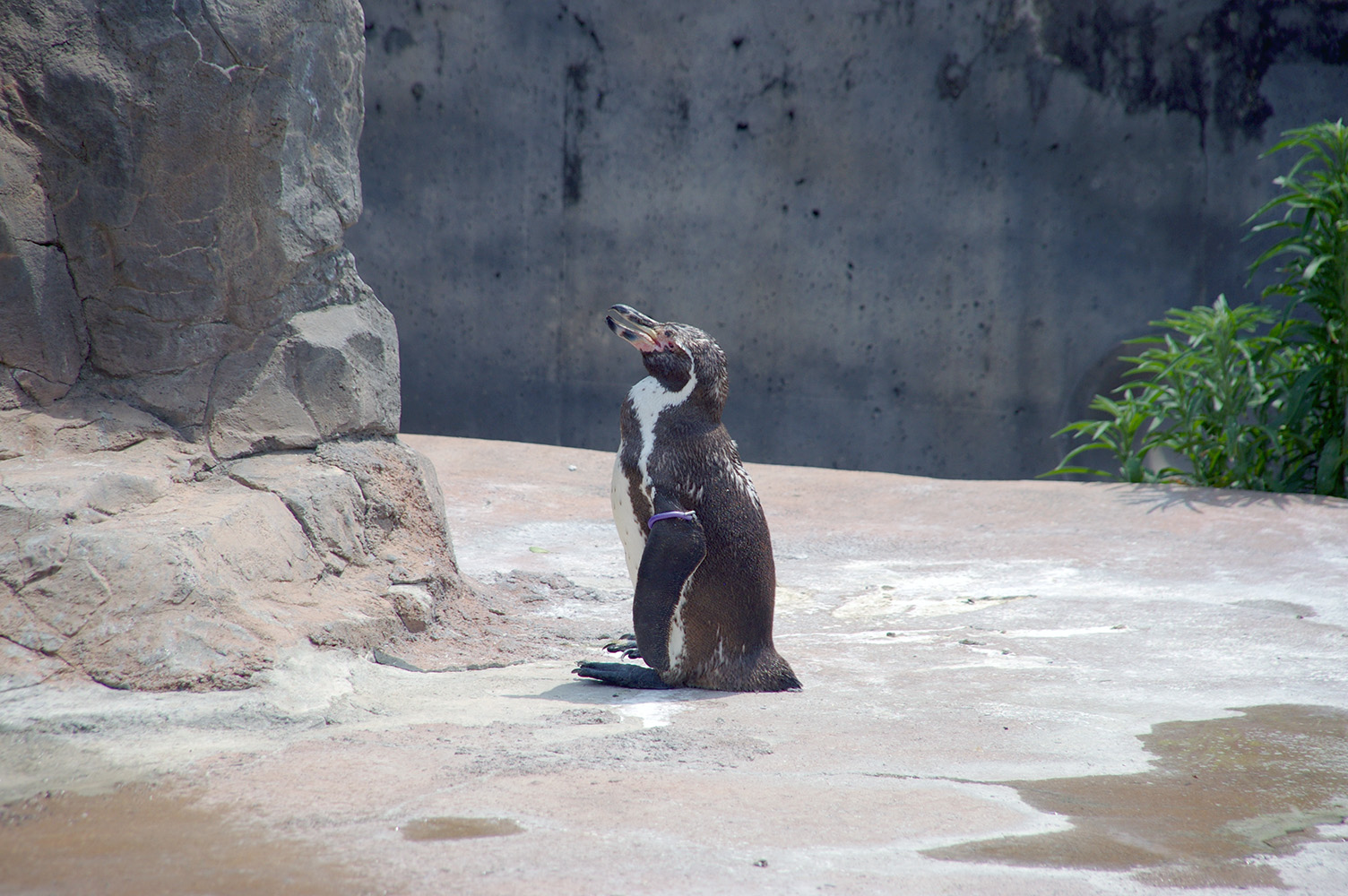
- Grape-kun staring up at a rock in his enclosure
- Species: Spheniscus humboldti
- Sex: Male
- Hatched: 16 April 1996; Hamura Zoo, Hamura, Tokyo, Japan
- Died: 12 October 2017 (aged 21); Tobu Zoo, Miyashiro, Saitama, Japan
- Known for: Attachment to anime character cutout

Grape (16 April 1996 – 12 October 2017), colloquially known as Grape-kun (グレープ君, Gurēpu-kun), was a Humboldt penguin (Spheniscus humboldti) at Tobu Zoo in Miyashiro, Saitama Prefecture, Japan. His attachment to a cutout of Hululu, an anthropomorphic Humboldt penguin character from the 2017 anime series Kemono Friends, earned him international fame and an online fan base. Grape-kun died after a brief illness in October 2017, and was commemorated by the zoo and his fans.

== Early life ==
Grape was born at Hamura Zoo in Tokyo in 1996. He was named because of the color of the purple ring placed on his wing for identification; the suffix -kun is a Japanese honorific usually used when speaking to younger males. It is also commonly used for male pets. Along with his mate, Midori, he was transferred to Tobu Zoo in Miyashiro, Saitama, in March 2006. Midori and Grape-kun hatched a chick together, but the zoo removed the baby, citing inbreeding as the reason to separate it from its parents. The experience was difficult for the pair, and could have affected the bond between Grape-kun and Midori. Whether the loss of their chick was a factor or not, Midori left Grape-kun for a younger penguin after a decade of being together. After this occurred, all of the other penguins in Grape-kun's exhibit rejected him, and he spent most of his time isolated from the rest of the colony.

== Attachment to anime character cutout ==
In April 2017, Tobu Zoo placed 60 cutouts of characters from the popular anime series Kemono Friends around the grounds to attract visitors. Hululu, (the cutout) placed in Grape-kun's enclosure, was an anthropomorphic Humboldt penguin and was part of a campaign to help visitors learn more about the animals in the zoo.

Grape-kun would spend a long time staring at the Hululu cutout, which was placed on a tall rock, even going as far as trying to reach it. Zookeepers had to separate Grape-kun from the cutout after closing to prevent him from falling into the pool near it. Many rumors spread that this was done because he would not eat, but the zoo denied them. Media outlets described Grape-kun as having "fallen in love", and the zoo created a drink called "Loving Grape" described as a "perfect embodiment" of the penguin's relationship with his love. When the Kemono Friends promotion came to an end, the decision was made to retain the Hululu cutout in Grape-kun's enclosure.

Grape-kun's devotion to the cutout earned him fame and a global fan base on the Internet. Hululu's voice actress, Ikuko Chikuta, visited Grape-kun as part of an educational event on penguins.

== Death ==
On 9 October 2017, a festival honoring Grape-kun was announced for the following month. However, these plans were cancelled the next day due to Grape-kun's health suddenly declining. The zoo announced his death on 12 October. Zoo personnel created a small shrine in his honor, and several guests visited the penguin enclosure with flowers. Social media users paid tribute through the hashtag #grapekun, and many posted illustrations of Grape-kun and Hululu. In January 2018, Tobu Zoo placed a new cutout in the penguin enclosure, featuring an illustration of Grape-kun and Hululu standing side-by-side.

== Gallery ==
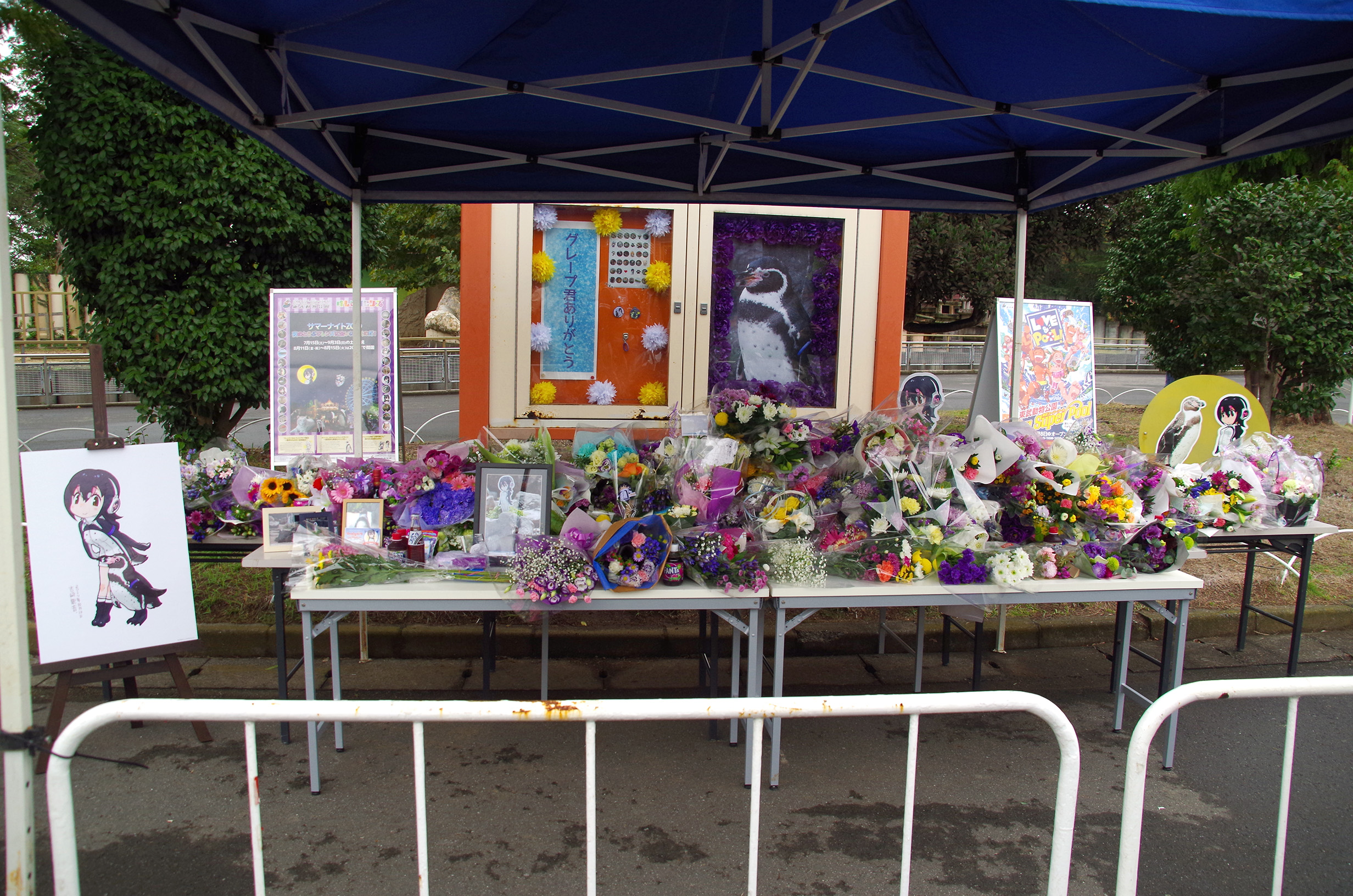
Flowers and other gifts after Grape-kun's passing (14 October 2017)

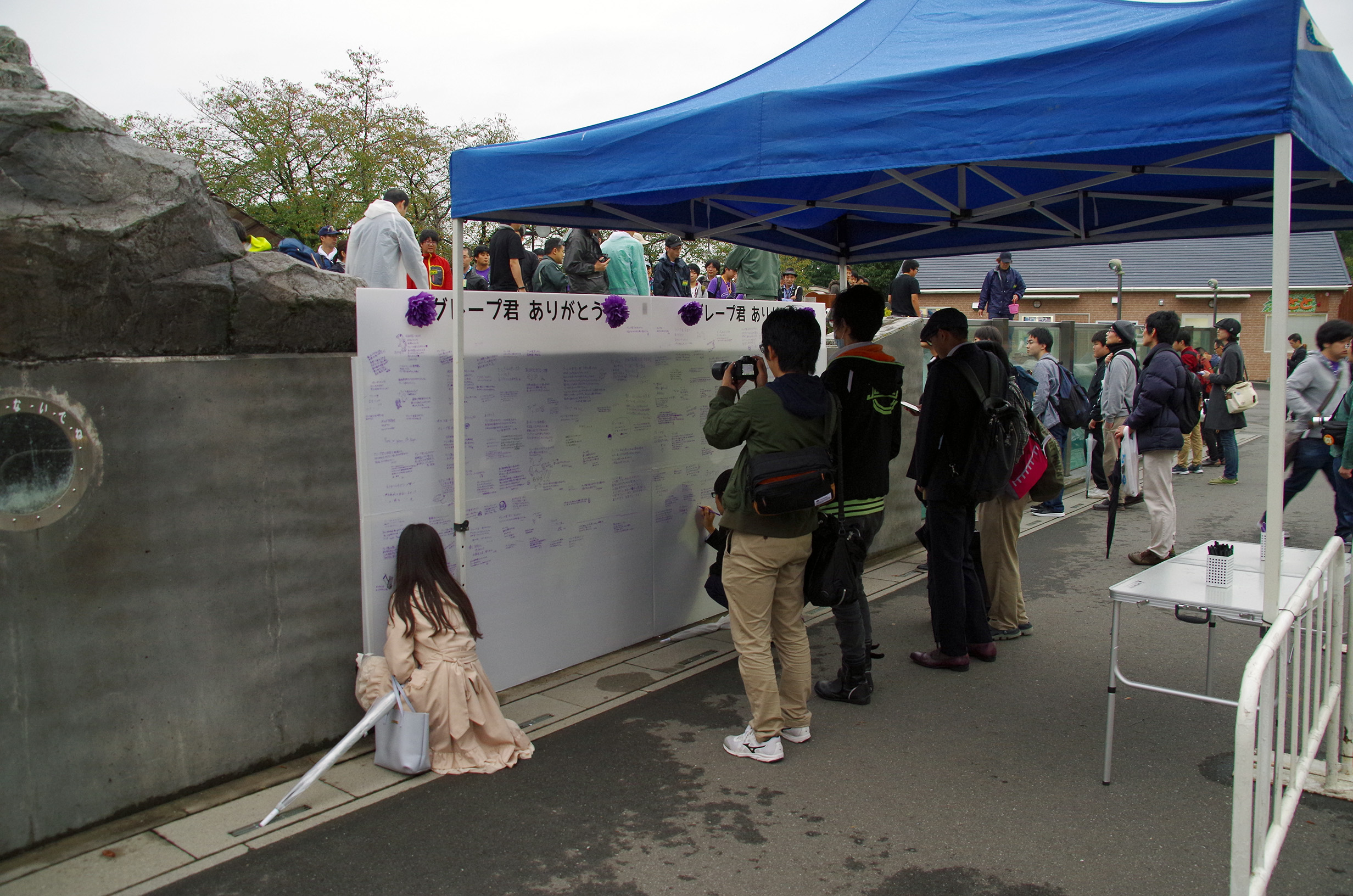
Temporary message board for Grape-kun (14 October 2017)

== See also ==
- List of individual birds
- Punch (monkey)
