= Kisai =

Kisai 騎西
- Former municipality
- Location of Kisai in Saitama Prefecture

- Location in Japan
- Coordinates: 36°6′N 139°34′E
- Country: Japan
- Region: Kantō
- Prefecture: Saitama Prefecture
- District: Kitasaitama
- Merged: March 23, 2010 (now part of Kazo)

Area
  - Total: 28.60 km^{2} (11.04 sq mi)

Population (2007)
  - Total: 19,884
  - Density: 695.24/km^{2} (1,800.7/sq mi)
- Time zone: UTC+09:00 (JST)
- Website: Kisai
- Symbols
- Flower: Wisteria
- Tree: Ginkgo

Kisai (騎西町, Kisai-machi) was a town located in Kitasaitama District, Saitama Prefecture, Japan.

As of 2003, the town had an estimated population of 20,105 and a density of 702.97 persons per km^{2}. The total area was 28.60 km^{2}.

On March 23, 2010, Kisai, along with the towns of Kitakawabe and Ōtone (all from Kitasaitama District), was merged into the expanded city of Kazo. Kitasaitama District was dissolved as a result of this merger.
