= Kurihashi, Saitama =

Dissolved municipality in Saitama prefecture, Japan

Coordinates: 36°8′N 139°42′E

Location of Kurihashi in Saitama Prefecture

Kurihashi (栗橋町, Kurihashi-machi) was a town located in Kitakatsushika District, Saitama Prefecture, Japan.

As of 2003, the town had an estimated population of 26,125 and a density of 1,655.58 persons per km^{2}. The total area was 15.78 km^{2}.

On March 23, 2010, Kurihashi, along with the town of Washimiya (also from Kitakatsushika District), and the town of Shōbu (from Minamisaitama District), was merged into the expanded city of Kuki.
