= Shōwa, Saitama =

Dissolved municipality in Saitama prefecture, Japan

Shōwa (庄和町, Shōwa-machi) was a town in Kitakatsushika District, Saitama Prefecture, Japan.

As of 2003, the town had an estimated population of 37,047 and a density of 1,316.06 inhabitants per square kilometre (3,408.6/sq mi). The total area was 28.15 km^{2} (10.87 sq mi).

On October 1, 2005, Shōwa was merged into the expanded city of Kasukabe and no longer exists as an independent municipality.
