= Kitakawabe =

Kitakawabe 北川辺
- Former municipality
- Location of Kitakawabe in Saitama Prefecture

- Location in Japan
- Coordinates: 36°11′N 139°40′E
- Country: Japan
- Region: Kantō
- Prefecture: Saitama Prefecture
- District: Kitasaitama
- Merged: March 23, 2010 (now part of Kazo)

Area
  - Total: 21.00 km^{2} (8.11 sq mi)

Population (June 1, 2009)
  - Total: 12,763
  - Density: 608/km^{2} (1,570/sq mi)
- Time zone: UTC+09:00 (JST)
- Website: Kitakawabe
- Symbols
- Flower: Iris
- Tree: Ume

Kitakawabe (北川辺町, Kitakawabe-machi) was a town located in Kitasaitama District, Saitama Prefecture, Japan.

As of June 1, 2009, the town had an estimated population of 12,763 and a density of 608 persons per km^{2}. The total area was 21.00 km^{2}.

On March 23, 2010, Kitakawabe, along with the towns of Kisai and Ōtone (all from Kitasaitama District), was merged into the expanded city of Kazo. Kitasaitama District was dissolved as a result of this merger.
