= Shōbu, Saitama =

Dissolved municipality in Saitama prefecture, Japan

Coordinates: 36°4′N 139°36′E

Location of Shōbu in Saitama Prefecture

Shōbu (菖蒲町, Shōbu-machi) was a town located in Minamisaitama District, Saitama Prefecture, Japan.

== Population ==
As of 2003, the town had an estimated population of 21,837 and a density of 797.84 persons per km^{2}. The total area was 27.67 km^{2}.

== Attractions ==
Shibuya is well known among other parts of Saitama for housing the large shopping complex Mallage, which is a source of shopping and enjoyment for many of Shobus' citizens, and has put Shobu on the map.

== Development ==
There is a large road, Ken-O expressway which is being built through Shobu at this present time.

== Famous residents ==
The famous conservationist, Honda Seiroku, who designed many of Japan's city and National parks was born in Shobu.

== History ==
On March 23, 2010, Shōbu, along with the towns of Kurihashi and Washimiya (both from Kitakatsushika District), was merged into the expanded city of Kuki.

== Radio ==
At Shōbu, there was Shobu-Kuki transmitter, one of the largest stations for AM and shortwave broadcasting in Japan.
