= Ōtone =

Ōtone 大利根町
- Former municipality
- Location of Ōtone in Saitama Prefecture

- Location in Japan
- Coordinates: 36°8′N 139°40′E
- Country: Japan
- Region: Kantō
- Prefecture: Saitama Prefecture
- District: Kitasaitama
- Merged: March 23, 2010 (now part of Kazo)

Area
  - Total: 24.47 km^{2} (9.45 sq mi)

Population (June 1, 2008)
  - Total: 14,855
  - Density: 607.07/km^{2} (1,572.3/sq mi)
- Time zone: UTC+09:00 (JST)
- Website: Ōtone

Ōtone (大利根町, Ōtone-machi) was a town located in Kitasaitama District, Saitama Prefecture, Japan.

As of January 1, 2008, the town had an estimated population of 14,855 and a density of 607.07 persons per km^{2}. The total area was 24.47 km^{2}.

On March 23, 2010, Ōtone, along with the towns of Kisai, Kitakawabe (all from Kitasaitama District), was merged into the expanded city of Kazo. Kitasaitama District was dissolved as a result of this merger.
