= Washimiya, Saitama =

Dissolved municipality in Saitama prefecture, Japan

Coordinates: 36°6′N 139°40′E

Location of Washimiya in Saitama Prefecture

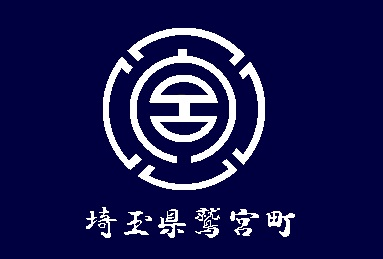
Flag of Washimiya

Washimiya (鷲宮町, Washimiya-machi) was a town located in Kitakatsushika District, Saitama, Japan.

In 2003, the town had an estimated population of 33,739 and a density of 2,427.27 per square kilometre (6,286.6/sq mi). The total area is 13.90 square kilometres (5.37 sq mi).

On March 23, 2010, the town of Washimiya, along with the town of Kurihashi (also from Kitakatsushika District), and the town of Shōbu (from Minamisaitama District), was merged into the expanded city of Kuki.

Washimiya was famous for Washinomiya Shrine, one of the oldest shrines in the Kanto Region, and is the setting of Lucky Star, which causes otaku tourism.
