= Miyashiro =

Miyashiro 宮代町
- Town
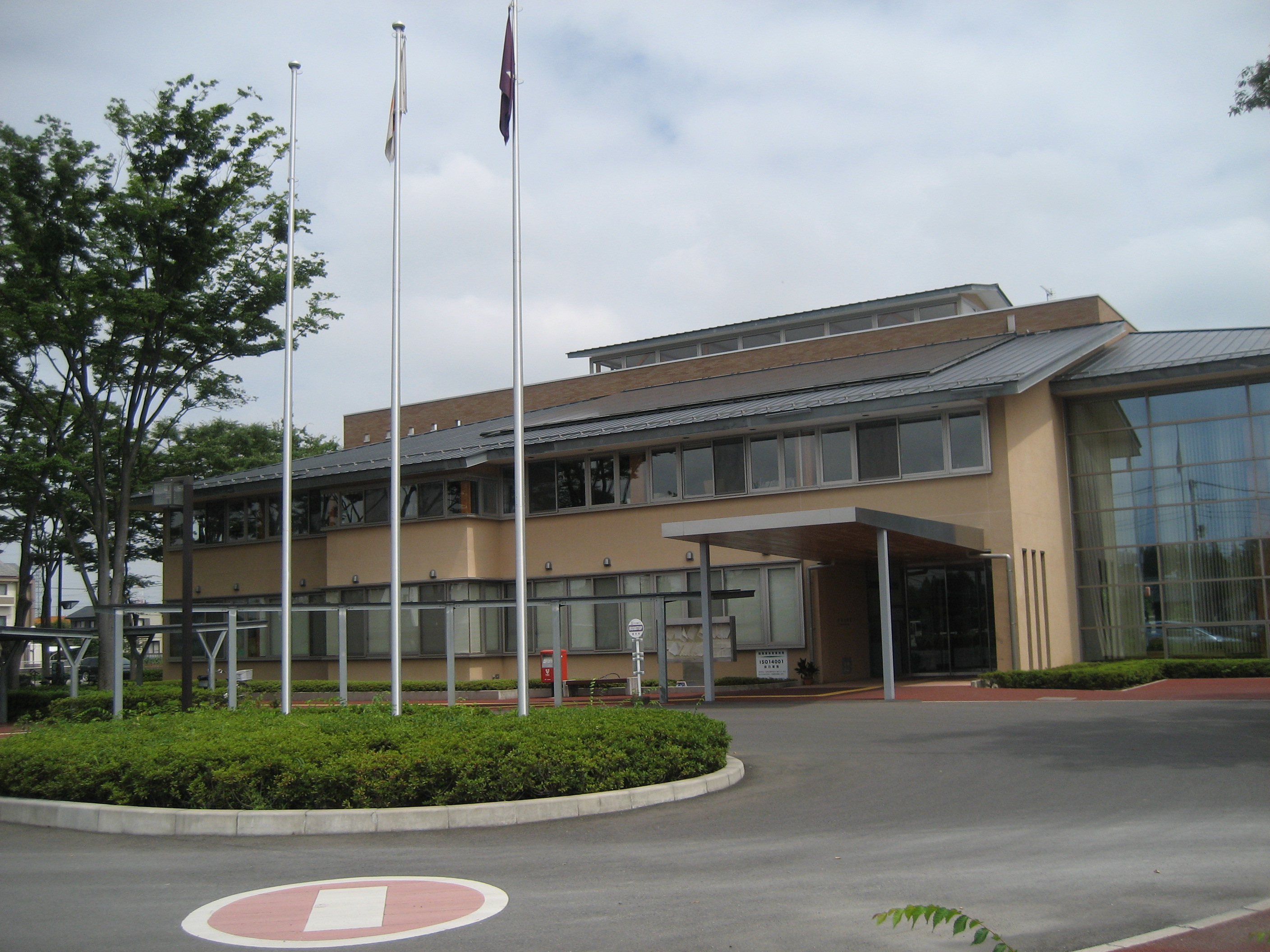
- Miyashiro town office

- Flag Seal

- Location of Miyashiro in Saitama Prefecture

- Coordinates: 36°1′21.6″N 139°43′21.8″E
- Country: Japan
- Region: Kantō
- Prefecture: Saitama
- District: Minamisaitama

Area
  - Total: 15.95 km^{2} (6.16 sq mi)

Population (March 2021)
  - Total: 33,823
  - Density: 2,121/km^{2} (5,492/sq mi)
- Time zone: UTC+9 (Japan Standard Time)
- Tree: Castanopsis
- Flower: Magnolia liliiflora
- Phone number: 0480-34-1111
- Address: 1-4-1 Kasahara, Miyashiro-machi, Minamisaitama-gun, Saitama-ken 345-8504
- Website: Official website

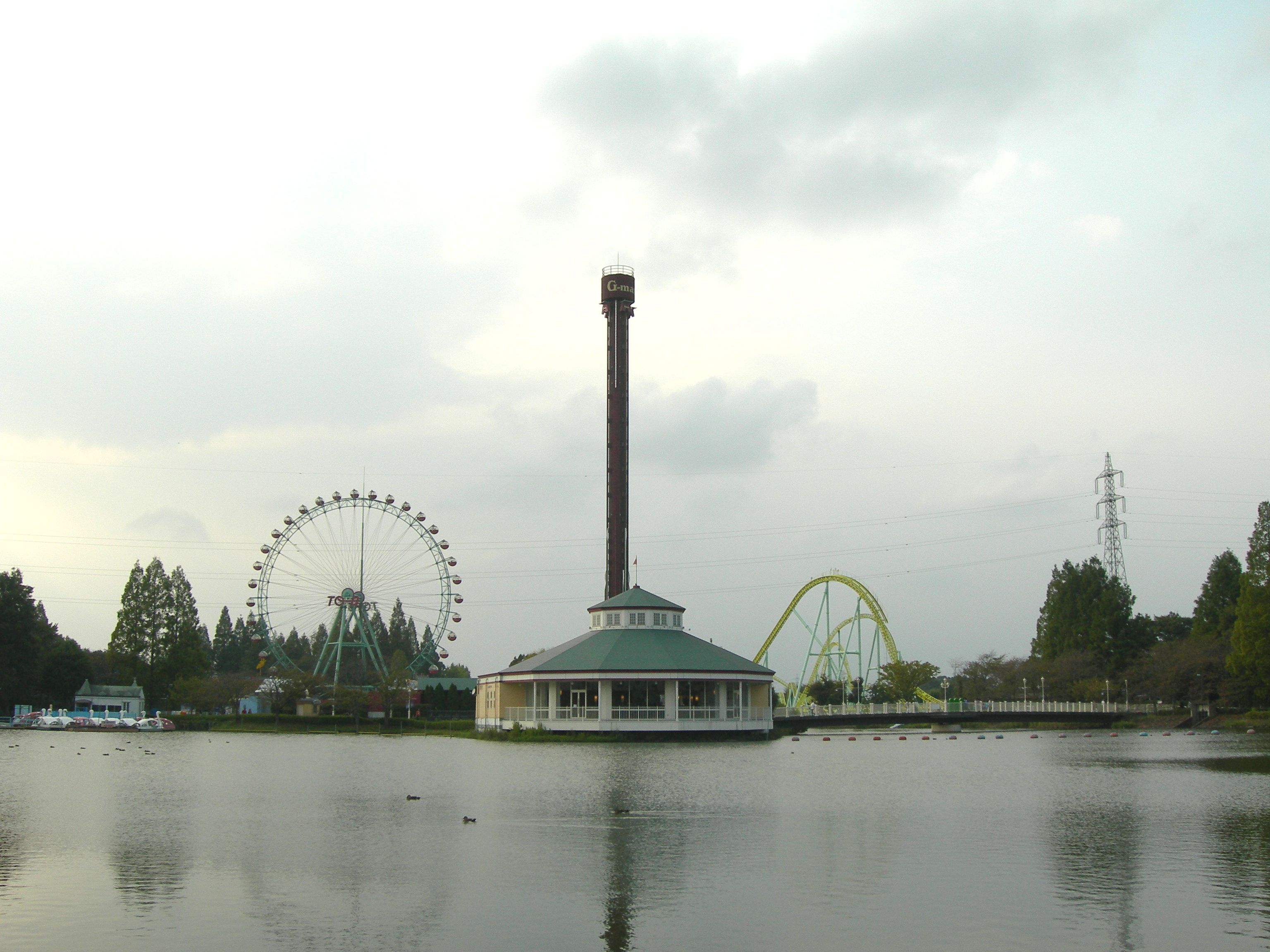
Tobu Zoo

Miyashiro (宮代町, Miyashiro-machi) is a town located in Saitama Prefecture, Japan. As of 1 March 2021, the town had an estimated population of 33,823 in 15,234 households and a population density of 2100 persons per km^{2}. The total area of the town is 15.95 square kilometres (6.16 sq mi).

== Geography ==
Miyashiro is located in central-west Saitama Prefecture.

=== Surrounding municipalities ===
Saitama Prefecture

- Kasukabe
- Kuki
- Shiraoka
- Sugito

=== Climate ===
Miyashiro has a humid subtropical climate (Köppen Cfa) characterized by warm summers and cool winters with light to no snowfall. The average annual temperature in Miyashiro is 14.5 °C. The average annual rainfall is 1408 mm with September as the wettest month. The temperatures are highest on average in August, at around 26.3 °C, and lowest in January, at around 2.7 °C.

== Demographics ==
Per Japanese census data, the population of Miyashiro has recently plateaued after a long period of growth.

Historical population
Year	Pop.	±%
1920	6,836	—
1930	7,116	+4.1%
1940	7,584	+6.6%
1950	10,463	+38.0%
1960	11,115	+6.2%
1970	16,656	+49.9%
1980	29,537	+77.3%
1990	33,837	+14.6%
2000	35,193	+4.0%
2010	33,641	−4.4%
2020	34,147	+1.5%

== History ==
The villages of Monma and Suka were created within Minamisaitama District, Saitama with the establishment of the modern municipalities system on April 1, 1889. The two villages were merged on July 20, 1955 to form the town of Miyashiro. Ina was elevated to town status on November 1, 1970. The origin of the town's name comes from the shrines of the largest villages. "Miya" was taken from Himemiya shrine (姫宮神社) in Himemiya village and "shiro" from Konoshiro shrine (身代神社) in Suka village.

== Government ==
Miyashiro has a mayor-council form of government with a directly elected mayor and a unicameral town council of 14 members. Miyashiro, together with the city of Shiraoka, contributes one member to the Saitama Prefectural Assembly. In terms of national politics, the town is part of Saitama 11th district of the lower house of the Diet of Japan.

== Economy ==
The economy of Miyashiro is primarily agricultural.

== Education ==
- Nippon Institute of Technology
- Miyashiro has four public elementary schools and three public middle schools operated by the city government, and one public high school operated by the Saitama Prefectural Board of Education. The prefecture also operates one special education school for the handicapped.

== Transportation ==
=== Railway ===
Tōbu Railway - Tōbu Isesaki Line/Tōbu Skytree Line

- Himemiya - Tōbu-Dōbutsu-Kōen - Wado

Tōbu Railway - Tōbu Nikkō Line

- Tōbu-Dōbutsu-Kōen

=== Highway ===
Miyashiro is not located on any national highway or expressway.

== Local attractions ==
- Tobu Zoo (東武動物公園, Tōbu Dōbutsu Kōen), a zoological-amusement park complex which is owned by the Tōbu Group.

== Noted people and animals from Miyashiro ==
- Grape-Kun (グレープ君 / Gurēpu-kun), Humboldt penguin (Spheniscus humboldti)
- Mariko Kouda, voice actress
