= Kazo, Saitama =

Kazo 加須市
- City
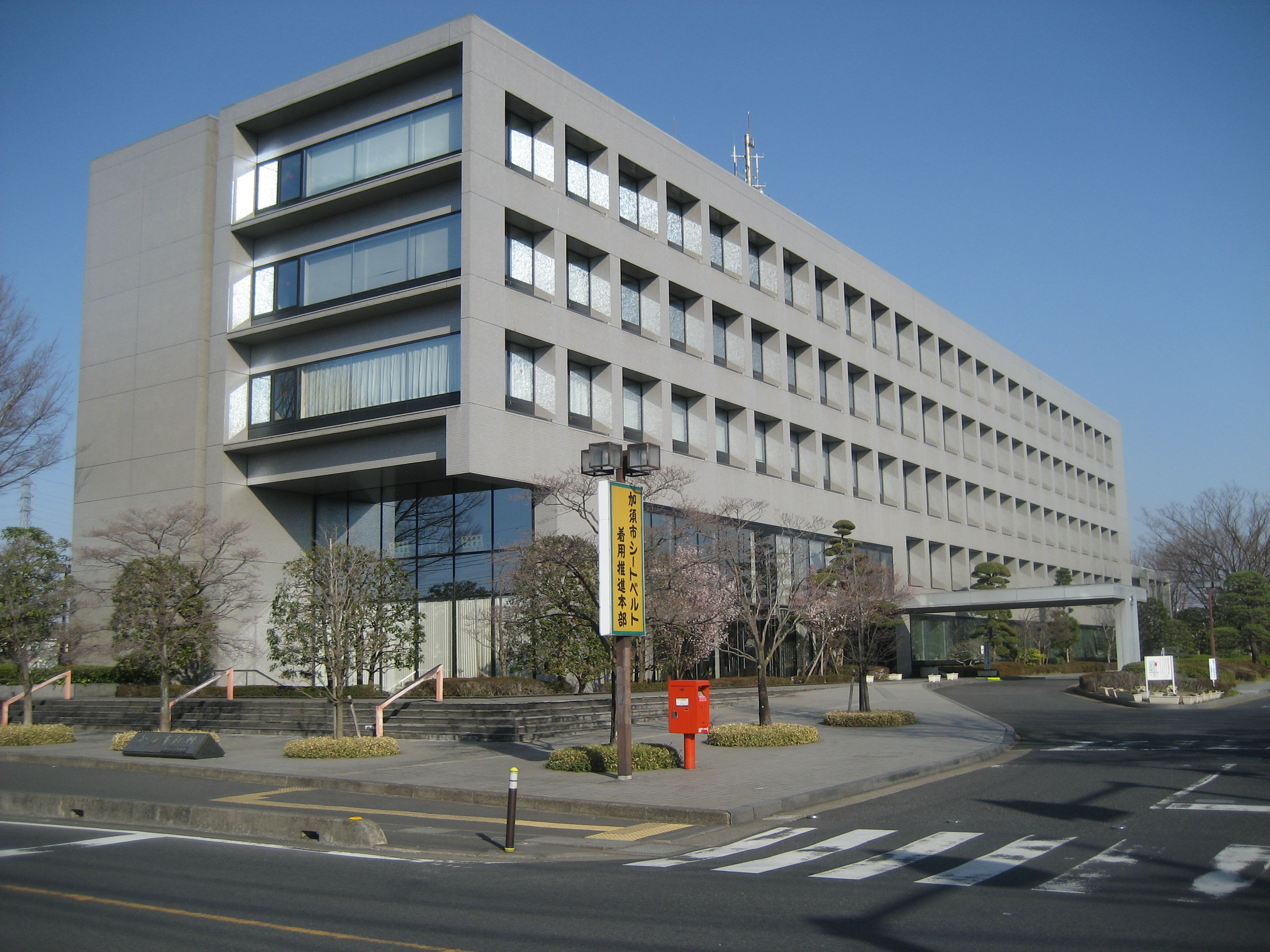
- Kazo City Hall

- Flag Seal

- Location of Kazo in Saitama Prefecture

- Location within Japan
- Coordinates: 36°7′53.2″N 139°36′6.4″E
- Country: Japan
- Region: Kantō
- Prefecture: Saitama
- First official recorded: Kofun period (estimated)
- Town Settled: April 1, 1889
- City Settled: May 3, 1954

Government
  - Mayor: Toshihiro Takahashi (高橋稔裕) - from April 2026

Area
  - Total: 133.30 km^{2} (51.47 sq mi)

Population (January 1, 2021)
  - Total: 112,792
  - Density: 846.15/km^{2} (2,191.5/sq mi)
- Time zone: UTC+9 (Japan Standard Time)
- Tree: Sakura
- Flower: Cosmos
- Phone number: 0480-62-1111
- Address: 2-1-1 Mitsumata, Kazo-shi, Saitama-ken 347-8501
- Website: Official website

Kazo (加須市, Kazo-shi) is a city located in Saitama Prefecture, Japan. As of 1 January 2021, the city had an estimated population of 112,792 in 48,213 households and a population density of 850 persons per km^{2}. The total area of the city is 133.30 square kilometres (51.47 sq mi). The city is noted for and is known throughout Japan for the creation of koinobori (carp kites), baseballs, kendo equipment, and Kazo-udon noodles.

== Geography ==
Kazo is located in far northeastern Saitama Prefecture, bordered by Gunma Prefecture, Tochigi Prefecture and Ibaraki Prefectures along the alluvial plain of the Watarase River and Tone River. The terrain is generally low and flat.

=== Surrounding municipalities ===
Ibaraki Prefecture

- Koga

Gunma Prefecture

- Itakura

Saitama Prefecture

- Gyōda
- Hanyū
- Kōnosu
- Kuki

Tochigi Prefecture

- Tochigi

=== Climate ===
Kazo has a humid subtropical climate (Köppen Cfa) characterized by warm summers and cool winters with light to no snowfall. The average annual temperature in Kazo is 14.6 °C. The average annual rainfall is 1318 mm with September as the wettest month. The temperatures are highest on average in August, at around 26.7 °C, and lowest in January, at around 3.5 °C.

== Demographics ==
Per Japanese census data, the population of Kazo peaked around the year 2000 and has declined slightly in the decades since.

Historical population
Year	Pop.	±%
1920	61,707	—
1930	63,035	+2.2%
1940	64,301	+2.0%
1950	79,912	+24.3%
1960	76,809	−3.9%
1970	76,501	−0.4%
1980	86,506	+13.1%
1990	100,697	+16.4%
2000	117,777	+17.0%
2010	115,002	−2.4%
2020	111,623	−2.9%

== History ==
The area of modern Kazo has been settled since prehistoric times and many burial mounds from the Kofun period dot the landscape. The name "Kazo" appears in Nara period documents describing within Musashi Province. During the Edo period, the Buddhist temple of Sogan-ji was a popular pilgrimage destination from Edo.

The town of Kazo was created within Kitasaitama District, Saitama with the establishment of the modern municipalities system on April 1, 1889. On May 3, 1954, Kazo annexed the neighboring town of Fudooka, and the villages of Mitsumata, Raiha, Ōkuwa, Mizufuka, Hirakikawa and Shidai and was elevated to city status.

On March 23, 2010, Kazo absorbed the towns of Kisai, Kitakawabe and Ōtone (all from Kitasaitama District) which was dissolved as a result of this merger.

== Government ==
Kazo has a mayor-council form of government with a directly elected mayor and a unicameral city council of 28 members. Kazo contributes three members to the Saitama Prefectural Assembly. In terms of national politics, the city is part of Saitama 12th district of the lower house of the Diet of Japan.

== Economy ==
- The computer graphics tablet manufacturer, Wacom is headquartered in Kazo.

== Education ==
- Heisei International University
- Kazo has 22 public elementary schools and eight public middle schools operated by the city government, and one public high school operated by the Saitama Prefectural Board of Education. In addition, there are one private middle school and two private high schools. The prefecture also operates one special education school for the handicapped.

== Transportation ==
=== Railway ===
Tobu Railway - Isesaki Line

- Kazo - Hanasaki

Tobu Railway - Nikkō Line

- Shin-Koga - Yagyū

=== Highway ===
- Tōhoku Expressway – Kazo Interchange
- National Route 122
- National Route 125
- National Route 354

== Local attraction ==
- Tochigi–Gunma–Saitama border

== Noted people from Kazo ==
- Yutaka Taniyama, mathematician
