= Kawasato, Saitama =

Dissolved municipality in Saitama prefecture, Japan

Kawasato (川里町, Kawasato-machi)

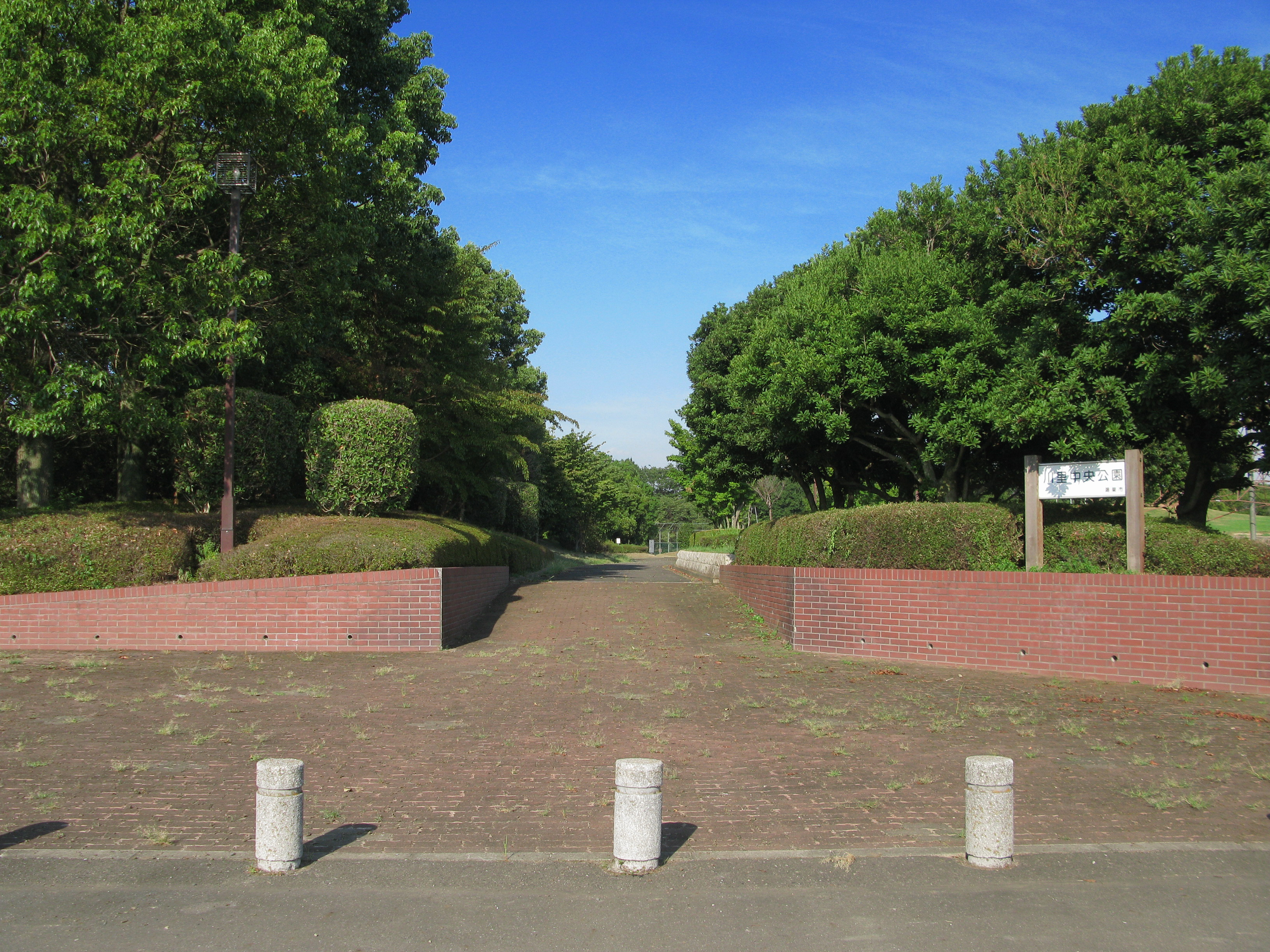
Photograph of park entrance.

was a town located in Kitasaitama District, Saitama, Japan.

As of 2003, the town has an estimated population of 7,909 and a density of 477.02 persons per km^{2}. The total area is 16.58 km^{2}.

On October 1, 2005, Kawasato, along with the town of Fukiage (from Kitaadachi District), was merged into the expanded city of Kōnosu.
