= Minamikawara, Saitama =

Village in Saitama Prefecture, Japan

Minamikawara (南河原村, Minamikawara-mura) was a village located in Kitasaitama District, Saitama Prefecture, Japan.

On January 1, 2006, Minamikawara was merged into the expanded city of Gyōda.

As of 2003, the village had an estimated population of 4,098 and a density of 704.12/km^{2} (1,823.66/sq mi). The total area is 5.82 km^{2} (2.25 sq mi).
