= Kuki, Saitama =

Kuki 久喜市
- City
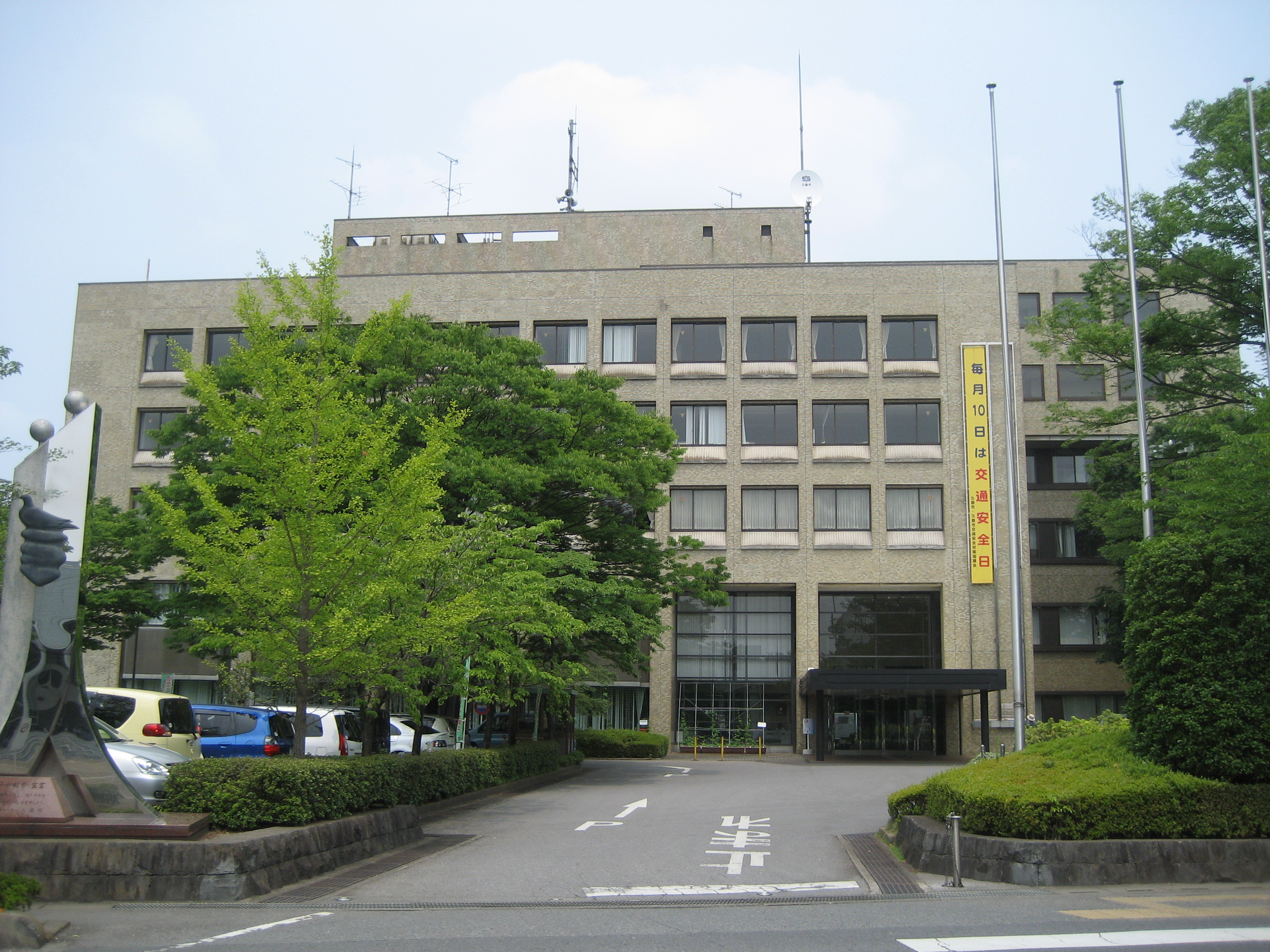
- Kuki City Hall

- Flag Seal

- Location of Kuki in Saitama Prefecture

- Location within Japan
- Coordinates: 36°3′43.5″N 139°40′0.5″E
- Country: Japan
- Region: Kantō
- Prefecture: Saitama
- Town Settled: April 1, 1889
- City Settled: October 1, 1971

Government
  - Mayor: Nobutomo Kishi (貴志信智) (from April 2026)

Area
  - Total: 82.41 km^{2} (31.82 sq mi)

Population (December 2010)
  - Total: 152,569
  - Density: 1,851/km^{2} (4,795/sq mi)
- Time zone: UTC+9 (Japan Standard Time)
- Phone number: 0480-22-1111
- Address: 85-3 Shimohayami, Kuki-shi, Saitama-ken 346-8501
- Climate: Cfa
- Website: Official website
- Symbols
- Flower: Pyrus pyrifolia
- Tree: Ginkgo biloba

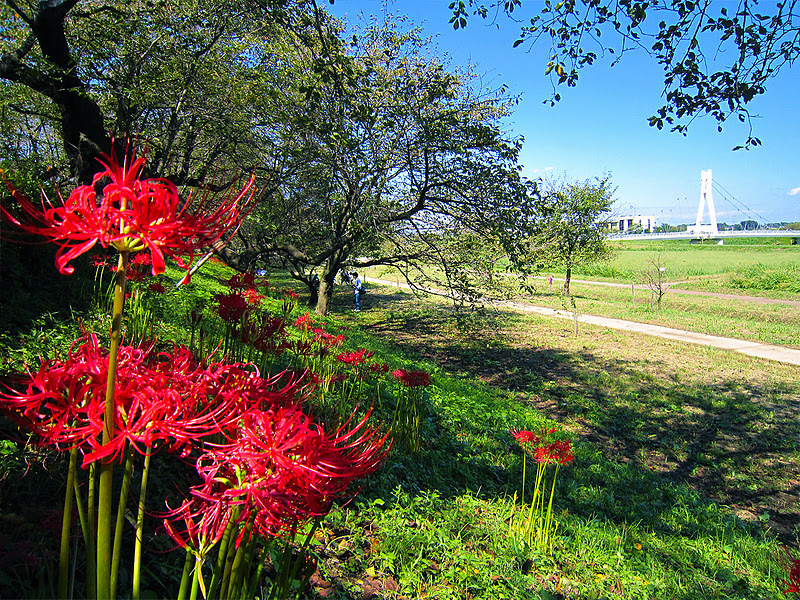
Gongendō Park

Kuki (久喜市, Kuki-shi) is a city located in Saitama Prefecture, Japan. As of 1 December 2020, the city had an estimated population of 152,569 in 67,339 households and a population density of 1900 persons per km^{2}. The total area of the city is 82.41 square kilometres (31.82 sq mi).

== Geography ==
Kuki is located in northeastern Saitama Prefecture, approximately 50 kilometers from downtown Tokyo in the alluvial plains of the Tone River.

=== Surrounding municipalities ===
Ibaraki Prefecture

- Goka
- Koga

Saitama Prefecture

- Hasuda
- Kazo
- Kōnosu
- Miyashiro
- Okegawa
- Satte
- Shiraoka
- Sugito

=== Climate ===
Kuki has a humid subtropical climate (Köppen Cfa) characterized by warm summers and cool winters with light to no snowfall. The average annual temperature in Kuki is 14.6 °C. The average annual rainfall is 1338 mm with September as the wettest month. The temperatures are highest on average in August, at around 26.7 °C, and lowest in January, at around 3.6 °C.

Climate data for Kuki (1991−2020 normals, extremes 1977−present)
Month	Jan	Feb	Mar	Apr	May	Jun	Jul	Aug	Sep	Oct	Nov	Dec	Year
Record high °C (°F)	18.3 (64.9)	24.2 (75.6)	26.2 (79.2)	30.7 (87.3)	34.4 (93.9)	36.1 (97.0)	38.6 (101.5)	38.9 (102.0)	37.7 (99.9)	32.7 (90.9)	25.6 (78.1)	25.0 (77.0)	38.9 (102.0)
Mean daily maximum °C (°F)	9.4 (48.9)	10.4 (50.7)	13.9 (57.0)	19.5 (67.1)	23.9 (75.0)	26.5 (79.7)	30.4 (86.7)	31.8 (89.2)	27.6 (81.7)	21.9 (71.4)	16.5 (61.7)	11.6 (52.9)	20.3 (68.5)
Daily mean °C (°F)	3.6 (38.5)	4.6 (40.3)	8.1 (46.6)	13.4 (56.1)	18.4 (65.1)	21.8 (71.2)	25.5 (77.9)	26.7 (80.1)	22.9 (73.2)	17.2 (63.0)	11.1 (52.0)	5.8 (42.4)	14.9 (58.9)
Mean daily minimum °C (°F)	−1.6 (29.1)	−0.7 (30.7)	2.6 (36.7)	7.7 (45.9)	13.6 (56.5)	18.0 (64.4)	21.9 (71.4)	22.9 (73.2)	19.2 (66.6)	13.0 (55.4)	6.1 (43.0)	0.6 (33.1)	10.3 (50.5)
Record low °C (°F)	−9.4 (15.1)	−10.6 (12.9)	−4.6 (23.7)	−2.0 (28.4)	3.7 (38.7)	10.6 (51.1)	14.1 (57.4)	14.9 (58.8)	9.0 (48.2)	3.2 (37.8)	−2.9 (26.8)	−6.7 (19.9)	−10.6 (12.9)
Average precipitation mm (inches)	43.2 (1.70)	38.6 (1.52)	82.0 (3.23)	99.5 (3.92)	124.2 (4.89)	142.7 (5.62)	147.3 (5.80)	146.8 (5.78)	199.2 (7.84)	190.9 (7.52)	65.4 (2.57)	41.6 (1.64)	1,321.4 (52.02)
Average precipitation days (≥ 1.0 mm)	3.9	4.8	8.5	9.2	10.3	11.6	11.6	8.4	11.3	10.1	6.3	4.3	100.3
Mean monthly sunshine hours	204.3	191.0	191.5	188.7	187.6	132.4	150.8	178.6	136.3	140.9	162.1	186.0	2,050.2
Source: JMA

== Demographics ==
Per Japanese census data, the population of Kuki has recently plateaued after a long period of growth.

Historical population
Year	Pop.	±%
1950	59,114	—
1960	60,409	+2.2%
1970	74,477	+23.3%
1980	114,920	+54.3%
1990	141,400	+23.0%
2000	154,292	+9.1%
2010	154,310	+0.0%
2020	150,582	−2.4%

== History ==
During the Sengoku period, the Koga kubō Ashikaga Masauji retired to the temple of Kantō-in, which is located within what is now Kuki. During the Edo period, Kuki Domain (10,000 koku) under the control of the Yonekitsu clan existed from 1684 to 1798. The town of Kuki was created within Minamisaitama District, Saitama with the establishment of the modern municipalities system on April 1, 1889. On July 1, 1954, Kuki merged with the neighboring villages of Ota, Ezura and Kiyoku. Kuki was elevated to city status on October 1, 1971. On March 23, 2010, Kuki absorbed the town of Shōbu (Minamisaitama District), and the towns of Kurihashi and Washimiya (both from Kitakatsushika District).

== Government ==
Kuki has a mayor-council form of government with a directly elected mayor and a unicameral city council of 27 members. Kuki contributes two members to the Saitama Prefectural Assembly. In terms of national politics, the city is divided between the Saitama 13th district and Saitama 14th districts of the lower house of the Diet of Japan.

== Economy ==
Kuki remains primarily an agricultural area, with rice as the predominant crop. The city has three industrial parks.

== Education ==
- Tokyo University of Science has a campus at Kuki.
- Kuki has 23 public elementary schools and 11 public middle schools operated by the city government, and five public high schools operated by the Saitama Prefectural Board of Education. The prefecture also operates one special education school for the handicapped.

== Transportation ==
=== Railway ===
JR East – Utsunomiya Line (Tōhoku Main Line),

- Kuki – Higashi-Washinomiya – Kurihashi

Tōbu Railway – Tōbu Isesaki Line

- Kuki – Washinomiya

Tōbu Railway – Tōbu Nikkō Line

- Kurihashi – Minami-Kurihashi

=== Highway ===
- Ken-Ō Expressway – Shobu Parking Area – Kuki-Shiraoka Junction
- Tōhoku Expressway – Kuki-Shiraoka Junction – Kuki Interchange
- National Route 4
- National Route 122
- National Route 125

== Local attractions ==
The city is famous as the setting of anime series Lucky Star and The Fruit of Grisaia, bringing thousands of anime tourists to see Washinomiya Shrine each year.

The Kuki Chōchin Matsuri (Kuki Lantern Festival), which features over 4,000 lanterns, is held annually on 12 and 18 July and draws in hundreds of thousands of spectators. It was first held in 1783 to pray for harvest after the eruption of Mount Asama caused major damage to the local crops.

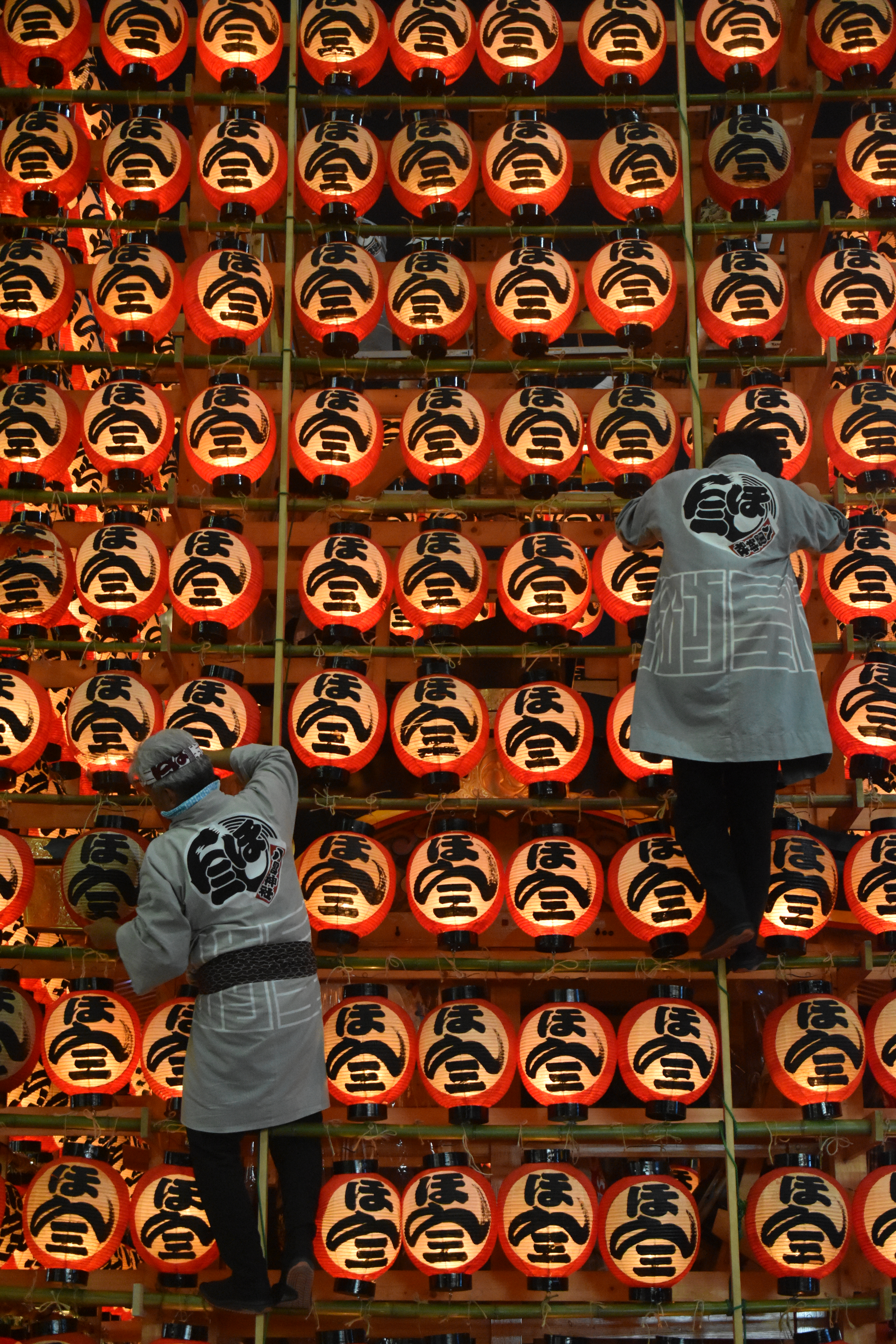
A detail of the Honsan float at the Kuki Lantern Festival.

== Sister cities ==
- Roseburg, Oregon, United States
