= 1000 yen coin =

Denomination of Japanese yen

One-thousand yen
- Japan
- Value: 1000 Japanese yen
- Edge: Reeded
- Composition: .925 Silver (1964).999 Silver (2002–)
- Years of minting: 1964 (First issue); 2002–present (Note: Non-consecutively)
- Catalog number: -

Obverse
- Design: Varies by year

Reverse
- Design: Varies by year

The 1000 yen coin is a denomination of the Japanese yen. This denomination is only used for the issue of commemorative silver coins struck by the Japan Mint.

== History ==
The first 1000 yen coin was issued in 1964 to commemorate the Tokyo Olympics. Since then, the Japan Mint has issued various 1000 yen coins commemorating various subjects and events of Japan's history. The recent 1000 yen commemorative coins now have color applied to parts of the coin's design.

== List of commemoratives ==
=== Early issues (1964–2007) ===
Image	Japanese date	Gregorian date	Mintage	Reason
	39; Shōwa	1964	15,000,000	1964 Summer Olympics
	14; Heisei	2002	100,000	2002 FIFA World Cup
	15; Heisei	2003	50,000	2003 Asian Winter Games
	15; Heisei	2003	50,000	50th anniversary of the restoration of the Amami Islands to Japan
	16; Heisei	2004	70,000	The EXPO 2005 AICHI JAPAN
	18; Heisei	2006	70,000	50th Anniversary of Japan's Accession to the United Nations
	19; Heisei	2007	80,000	International Skills Festival for All, Japan 2007

=== 47 Prefectures Coin Program (2008–2016) ===
Starting in 2008, a program similar to the American 50 State Quarters was put into place which honors all 47 of Japan's prefectures. This was done by celebrating the 60th Anniversary of Enforcement of the Local Autonomy Law in the form of 47 different commemorative coins (designs on obverse side). The program ran until 2016, concluding with the final issues for Tokyo and Fukushima. All 1,000 yen coins were minted in silver, and have a fixed mintage of 100,000 per issue. The Japanese dates used for the coins appears in Arabic numerals to reflect former emperor Akihito's (Heisei) year of reign. Many of the designs are cultural in nature and depict elements such as shrines, flora/fauna, and historical figures.

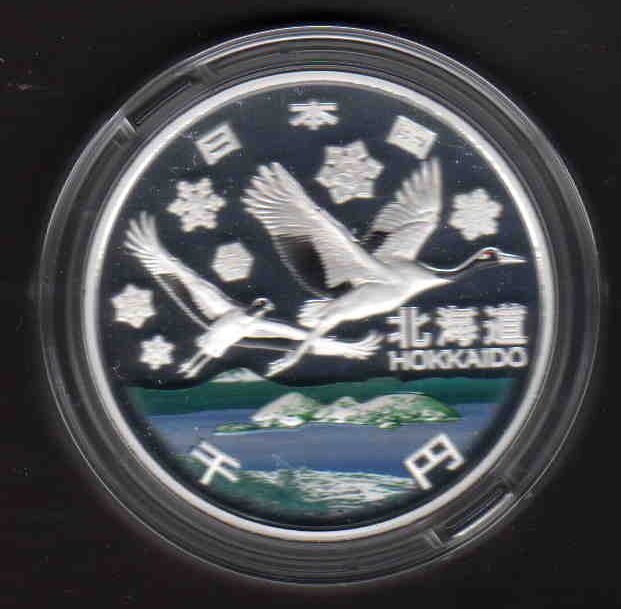
Various obverse designs have been used for the different prefectures (Hokkaido shown here)

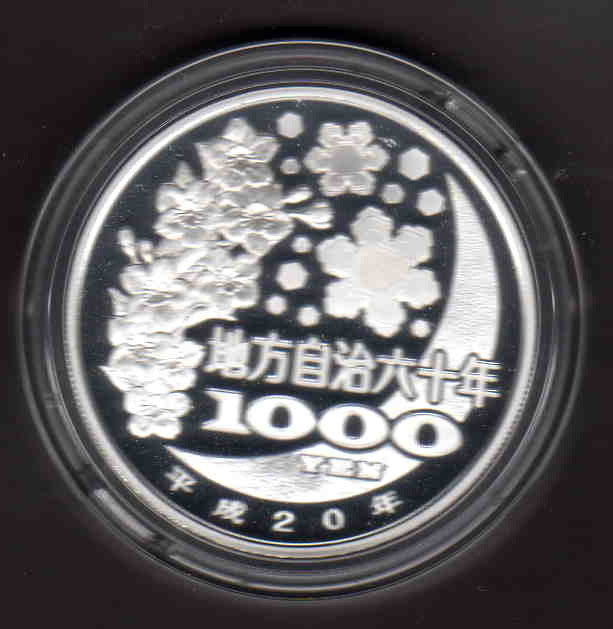
Reverse design for the Local Autonomy Law series

Japanese date	Gregorian date	Prefecture	Elements depicted
20	2008	Hokkaido	Lake Tōya and Red-crowned cranes
20	2008	Kyoto	Scene 3 from Chapter 49 of The Tale of Genji
20	2008	Shimane	Otoriosame-Chogin and peonies
21	2009	Nagano	The Japanese Alps and Kamikōchi
21	2009	Niigata	Japanese crested ibis and Sado Island
21	2009	Ibaraki	H-II (H2) launch vehicle and Mt. Tsukuba
21	2009	Nara	Daigokuden Seiden, cherry blossoms and kemari
22	2010	Kochi	Sakamoto Ryōma and Katsurahama beach
22	2010	Gifu	Ukai (cormorant fishing) on the Nagara River
22	2010	Fukui	Dinosaur and Tōjinbō
22	2010	Aichi	Kinshachi, (Note: Kinshachi are mythical golden carp-like creatures found on shrines in Japan.) rabbitear iris and Atsumi Peninsula
22	2010	Aomori	Nebuta, and Neputa festivals with apples at top
22	2010	Saga	Ōkuma Shigenobu with Imari ware and Arita ware
23	2011	Toyama	Tateyama Mountain Range seen from Amaharashi coast
23	2011	Tottori	Tottori Sand Dunes and Sanin Kaigan National Park
23	2011	Kumamoto	Mount Aso
23	2011	Shiga	Lake Biwa, Grebe family, and Ukimidō Temple
23	2011	Iwate	Chūson-ji Konjiki-dō, Chūson-ji Lotus and Pure Land garden of Mōtsū-ji
23	2011	Akita	Nobu Shirase and namahage
24	2012	Okinawa	Shuri Castle and Kumi Odori
24	2012	Kanagawa	Tsurugaoka Hachimangū shrine and yabusame
24	2012	Miyazaki	Prefectural Government - Main Building, and Takachiho Yokagura
24	2012	Tochigi	Gate (Yōmei–mon) of Nikkō Tōshō-gū shrine
24	2012	Oita	Usa Jingū shrine and Futabayama Sadaji
24	2012	Hyogo	Oriental stork with Himeji Castle in the background
25	2013	Miyagi	Date Masamune and Keichō Embassy to Europe
25	2013	Hiroshima	Itsukushima Shintō Shrine, bugaku and Japanese Red Maple leaves
25	2013	Gunma	Female worker at the Tomioka Silk Mill
25	2013	Okayama	Okayama Kōraku-en Garden and Momotarō
25	2013	Shizuoka	Mt. Fuji as depicted in one of Yokoyama Taikan's works (Ultramarine)
25	2013	Yamanashi	Mt. Fuji, Chūō Shinkansen test track, and grapes
25	2013	Kagoshima	Jōmon Sugi cedar tree, Mt. Nagatadake, and Rhododendron flowers
26	2014	Ehime	Dōgo Onsen (main building) and mikan oranges
26	2014	Yamagata	Mogami River and cherries
26	2014	Mie	Isuzu River, and Uji Bridge from the Ise Grand Shrine
26	2014	Kawaga	Ritsurin Garden
26	2014	Saitama	Shibusawa Eiichi and the Time Bell Tower
26	2014	Ishikawa	Yukitsuri protecting trees from snow at Kenroku-en garden, and Kotoji-tōrō
27	2015	Yamaguchi	Kintai Bridge and Akiyoshidai plateau
27	2015	Tokushima	Naruto whirlpools, Awa Dance Festival, and Sudachi blossoms
27	2015	Fukuoka	Okinoshima Island, Munakata Taisha grand shrine, and a gold ring (Note: The gold ring depicted is an artifact that was found on Okinoshima Island)
27	2015	Wakayama	Danjo Garan temple complex on Mt. Kōya
27	2015	Osaka	Osaka Castle and bunraku puppet
27	2015	Nagasaki	Oura Cathedral and Camellias
27	2015	Chiba	Tokyo Bay Aqua-Line and Canola flowers (nanohana)
28	2016	Fukushima	Hideyo Noguchi, Mt. Bandai and Lake Inawashiro
28	2016	Tokyo	Tokyo Tower, Rainbow Bridge and seagulls

=== Commemoratives (2012–present) ===
The following include commemorative issues that were released concurrently with the 47 Prefectures Coin Program, as well as those released up to present. Seven issues ran concurrently with the program, including a series that was launched in 2015 as a response to the 2011 Great East Japan earthquake and tsunami. Later issues include coins being released for the 2020 Summer Olympics in Tokyo.

Image	Japanese date	Gregorian date	Mintage	Reason
—N/a	Not dated	2012	50,000	67th Annual Meetings of the International Monetary Fund and the World Bank Group
—N/a	26; Heisei	2014	100,000	50th Anniversary of the opening of the Shinkansen
—N/a	27; Heisei	2015	33,286 (Note: These figures represent the number of coins sold in Japan)	The Great East Japan Earthquake Reconstruction Project: 1st Series
—N/a	27; Heisei	2015	31,575	The Great East Japan Earthquake Reconstruction Project: 2nd Series
—N/a	27; Heisei	2015	35,086	The Great East Japan Earthquake Reconstruction Project: 3rd Series
—N/a	27; Heisei	2015	34,184	The Great East Japan Earthquake Reconstruction Project: 4th Series
—N/a	28; Heisei	2016	50,000	The Olympics Handover (Rio de Janeiro to Tokyo)
—N/a	28; Heisei	2016	50,000	The Paralympics Handover (Rio de Janeiro to Tokyo)
—N/a	29; Heisei	2017	—N/a	2017 Asian Winter Games
—N/a	30; Heisei	2018	—N/a	50th Anniversary of the return of the Ogasawara Islands
—N/a	30; Heisei	2018	100,000	2020 Tokyo Summer Olympics and 2020 Tokyo Summer Paralympics (Series 1)
—N/a	30; Heisei	2018	—N/a	150th Anniversary of the Meiji Period (Early Meiji period train station)
—N/a	31; Heisei	2019	TBD	2019 Rugby World Cup
—N/a	31; Heisei	2019	TBD	2020 Tokyo Summer Olympics and 2020 Tokyo Summer Paralympics (Series 2)
—N/a	31; Heisei	2019	TBD	2020 Tokyo Summer Olympics and 2020 Tokyo Summer Paralympics (Series 3)
—N/a	2 Reiwa	2020	TBD	2020 Tokyo Summer Olympics and 2020 Tokyo Summer Paralympics (Series 4)
—N/a	3 Reiwa	2021	50,000	150th Anniversary of Japan's Postal System
—N/a	3 Reiwa	2021	50,000	150th Anniversary of Modern Currency System
—N/a	4 Reiwa	2022		50th Anniversary of the Reversion of Okinawa to Japan.
—N/a	4 Reiwa	2022	70,000	150th Anniversary of Railways in Japan.
—N/a	5 Reiwa	2023	50,000	Expo 2025 Osaka
