= Three Holy Mountains =

Japanese mountains

The Three Holy Mountains of Japan (日本三霊山, Nihon Sanreizan) are three mountains revered by tradition in Japan. The Three Holy Mountains are:

- Mount Fuji (富士山)
- Mount Haku (白山) (The White Mountain) known for its UNESCO World Heritage Site, Shirakawa-gō 白川郷
- Mount Tate (立山) ('standing mountain') known for its onsen 温泉 (Hot springs) and the cobalt blue waters of Mikurigaike みくりが池. It is also known for its steaming Jigokudani 地獄谷 (Hell Valley)

== Gallery ==
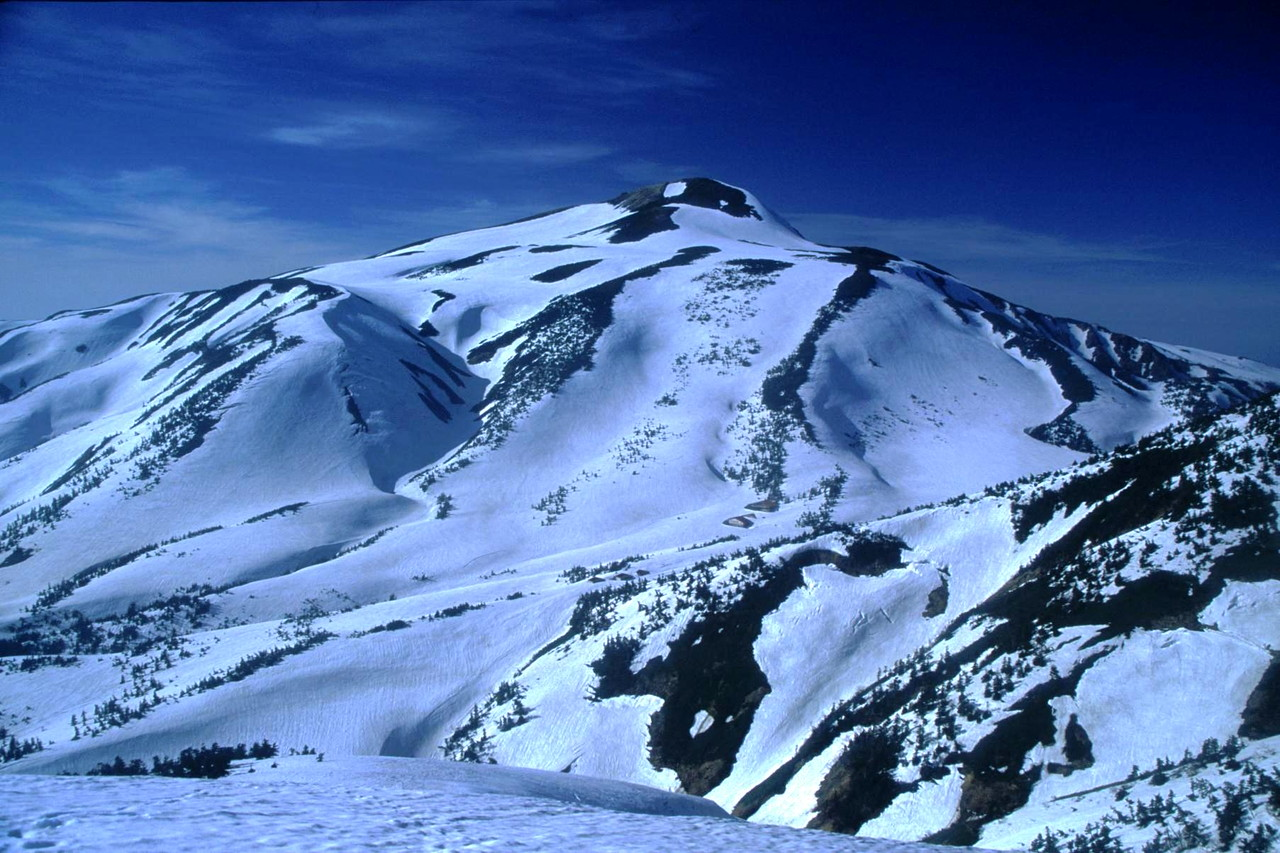
Mount Haku

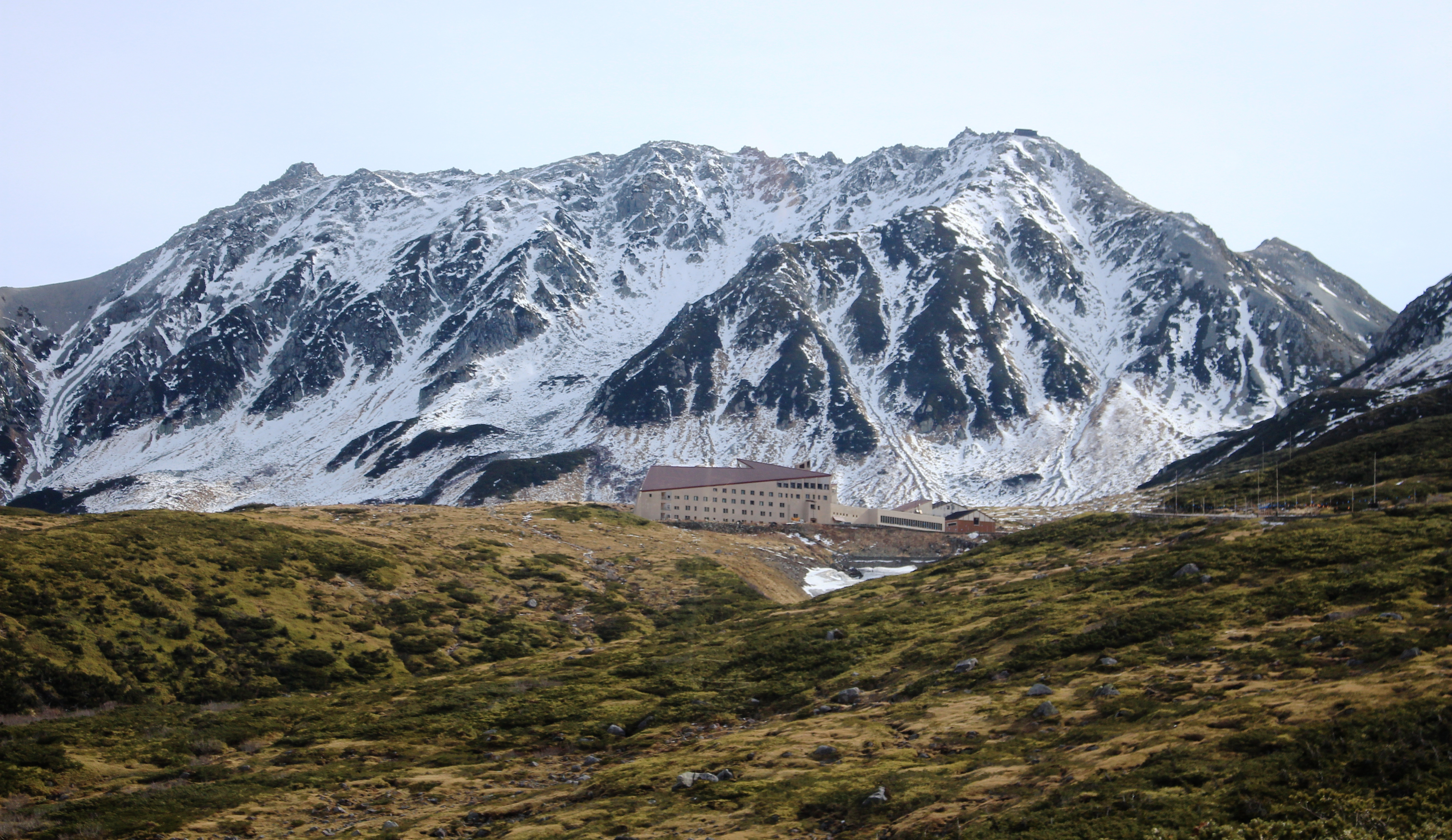
Mount Tate

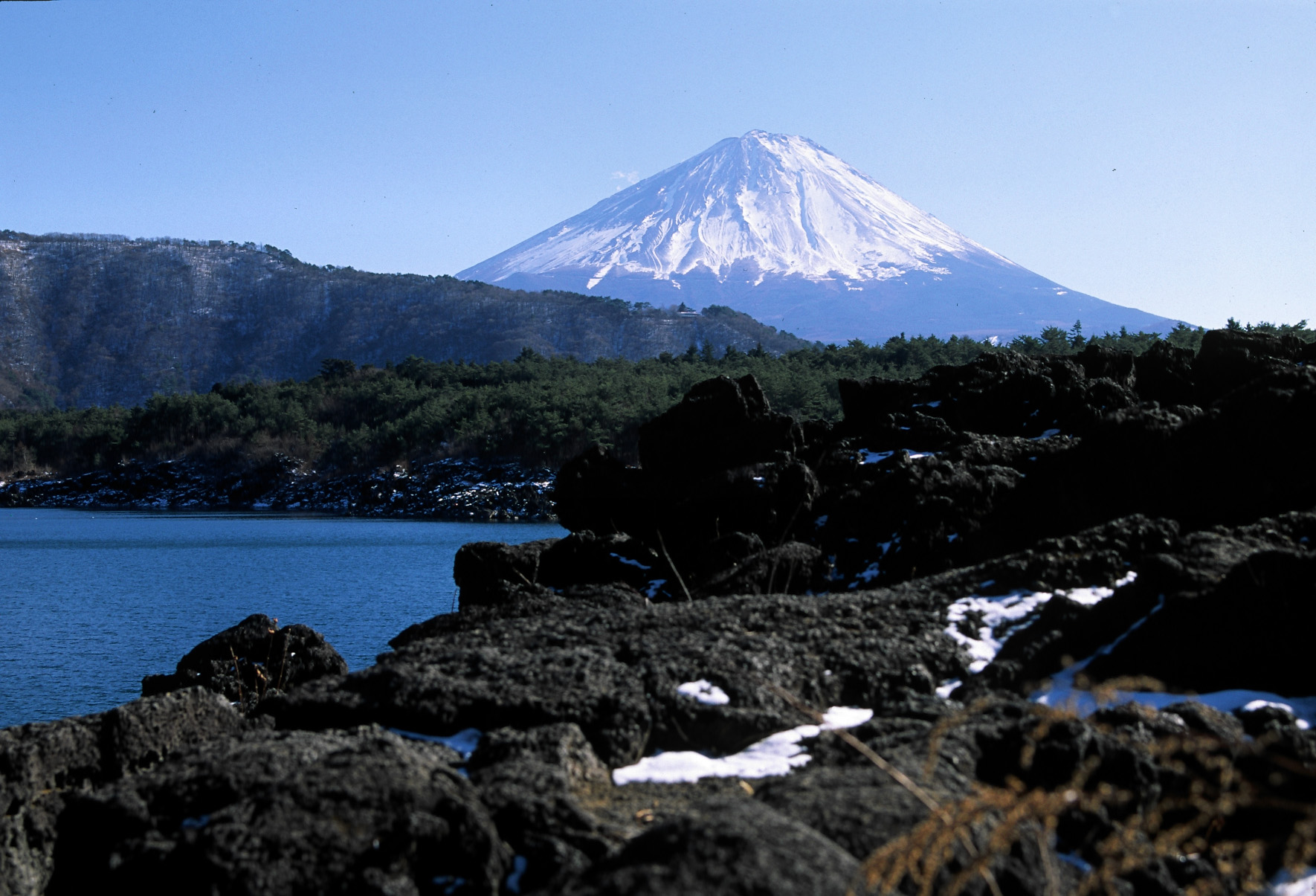
Mount Fuji

== See also ==
- Sacred mountains
- Three Great Gardens of Japan
- Three Views of Japan
