= Three Great Gardens of Japan =

Renowned gardens in Japan

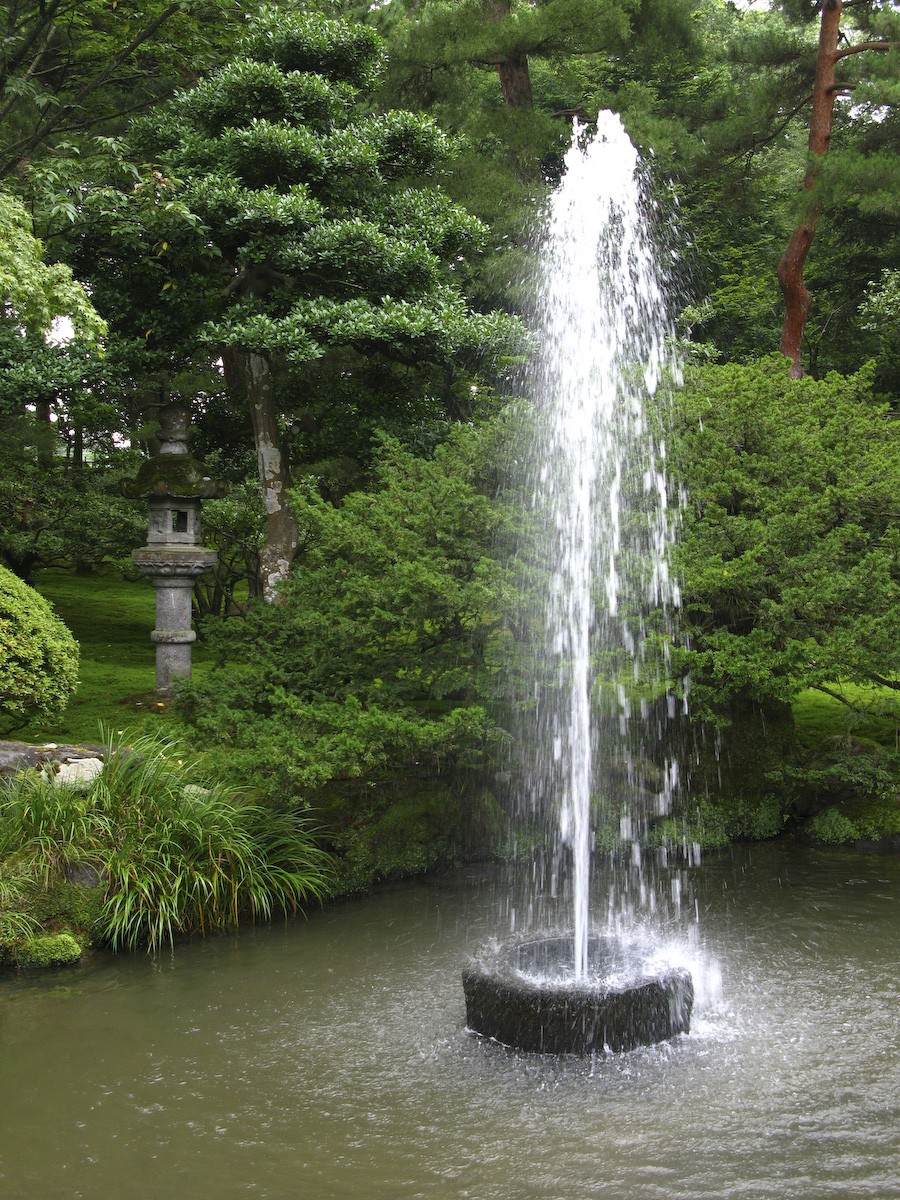
The oldest water fountain in Japan continues functioning at Kenroku-en in Kanazawa.

The Three Great Gardens of Japan (日本三名園, Nihon Sanmeien), also known as "the three most famous gardens in Japan" are considered to include Kenroku-en in Kanazawa, Kōraku-en in Okayama and Kairaku-en in Mito.

The conception of gardens in a group of three is found elsewhere, for example, in the three gardens of Emperor Go-Mizunoo, who abdicated in 1629. At Shugakuin Imperial Villa, Go-Mizunoo maintained landscaped areas at separate elevations on the northeastern outskirts of Kyoto.

== Kenroku-en ==
"Garden which combines six characteristics" – the six aspects considered important in the notion of an ideal garden: spaciousness, serenity, venerability, scenic views, subtle design, and coolness.

== Kōraku-en ==
"Garden of pleasure after", which is a reference to a saying attributed to Confucius—explaining that a wise ruler must attend to his subjects' needs first, and only then should he consider his own interests.

== Kairaku-en ==
"A garden to enjoy with people." Nariaki Tokugawa, who completed the garden, opened this private garden to the general populace. This was a novel concept which eventually led to the development of public parks.

== Gallery ==
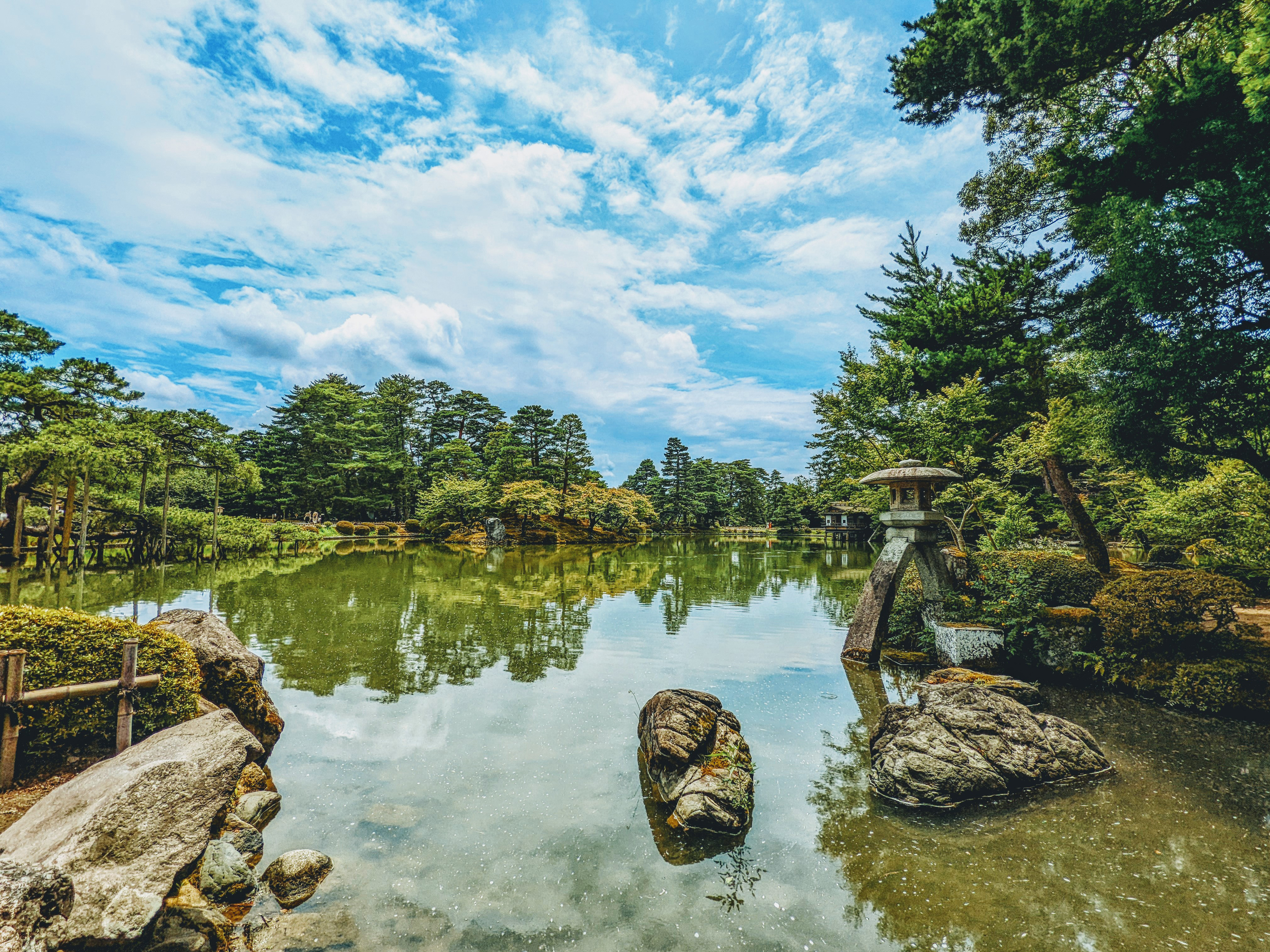
Kenroku-en

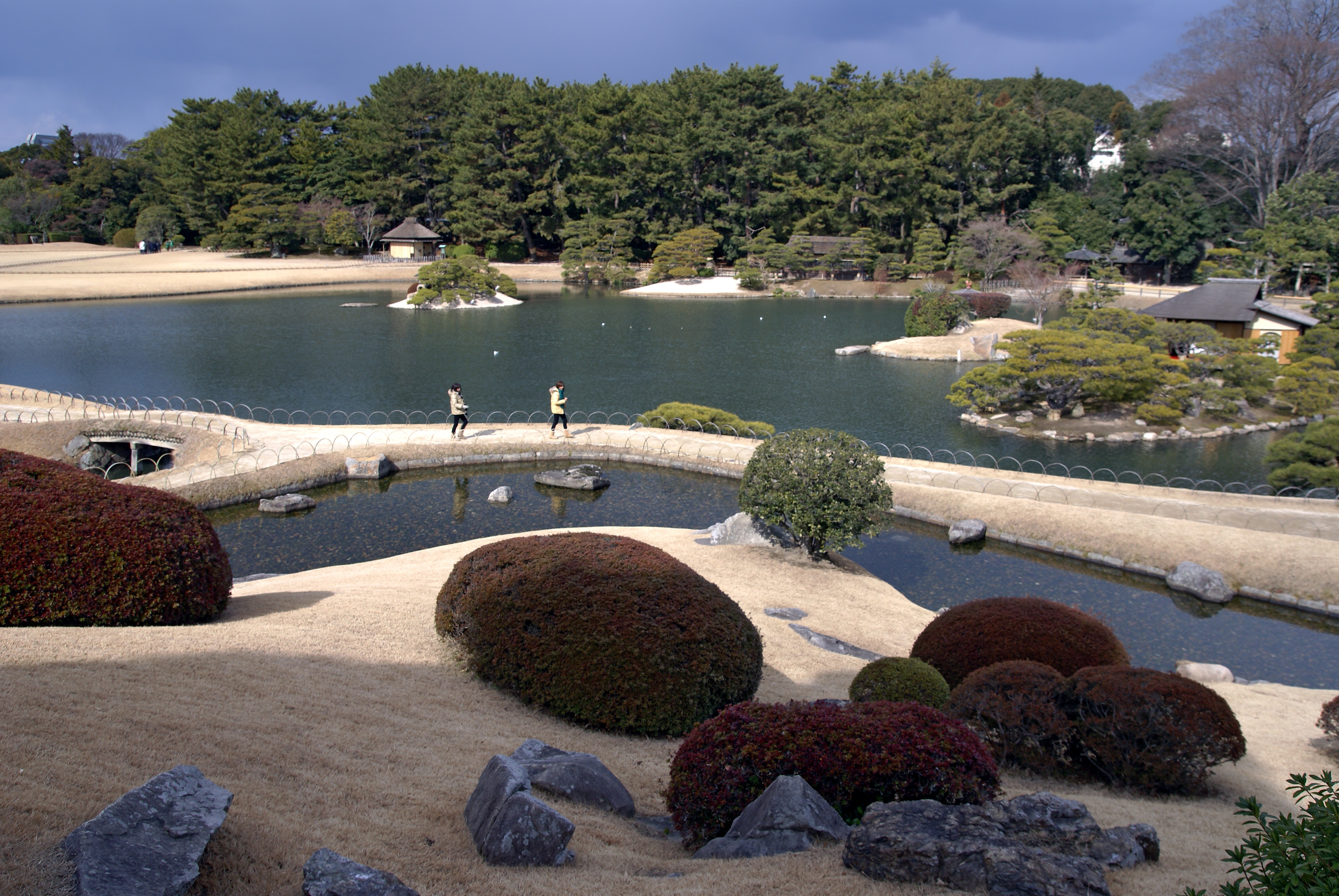
Kōraku-en

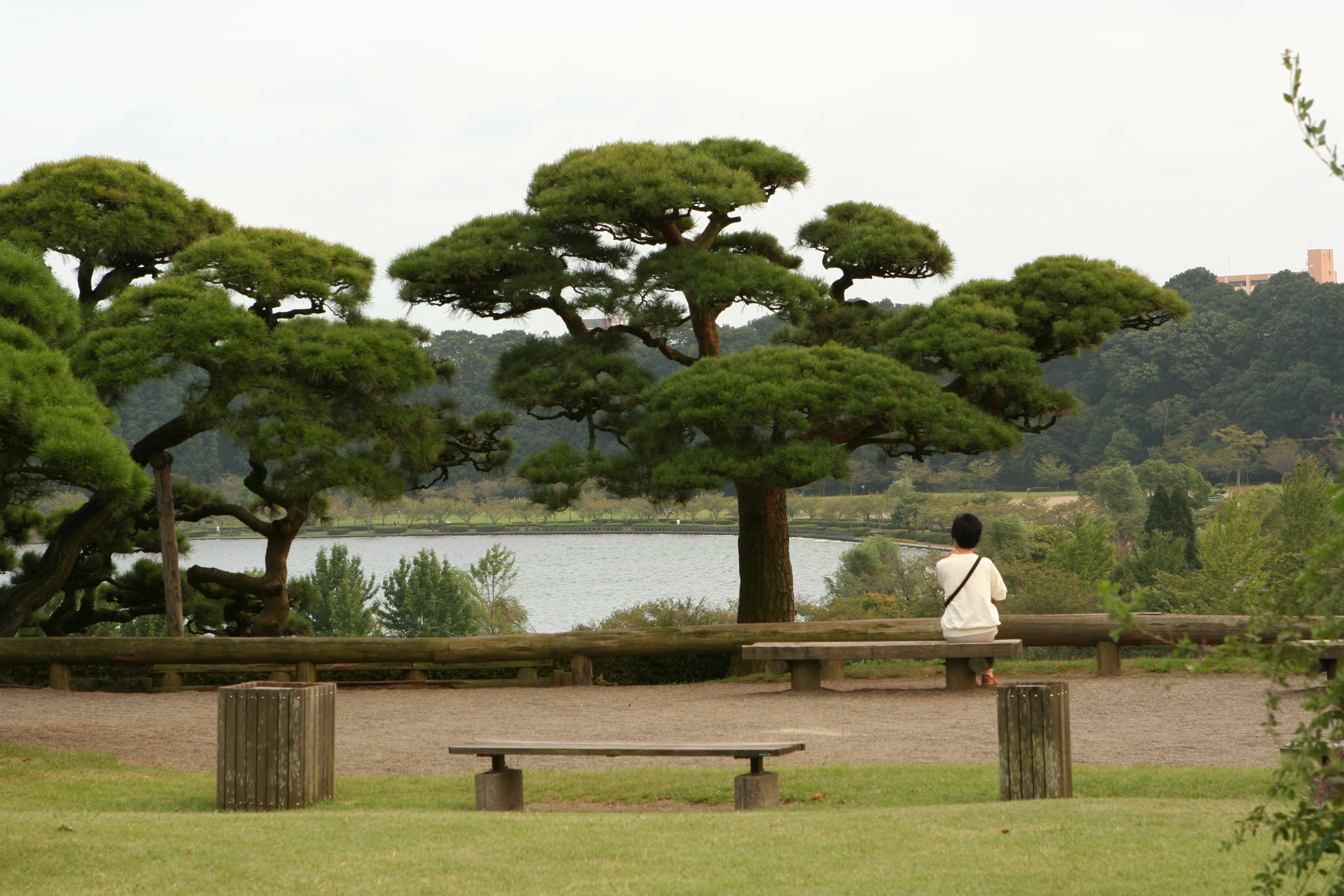
Kairaku-en

== See also ==
- Three Views of Japan
- Three Holy Mountains of Japan
- Tourism in Japan
