= Yukitsuri =

Japanese technique for preserving trees and shrubs from heavy snow

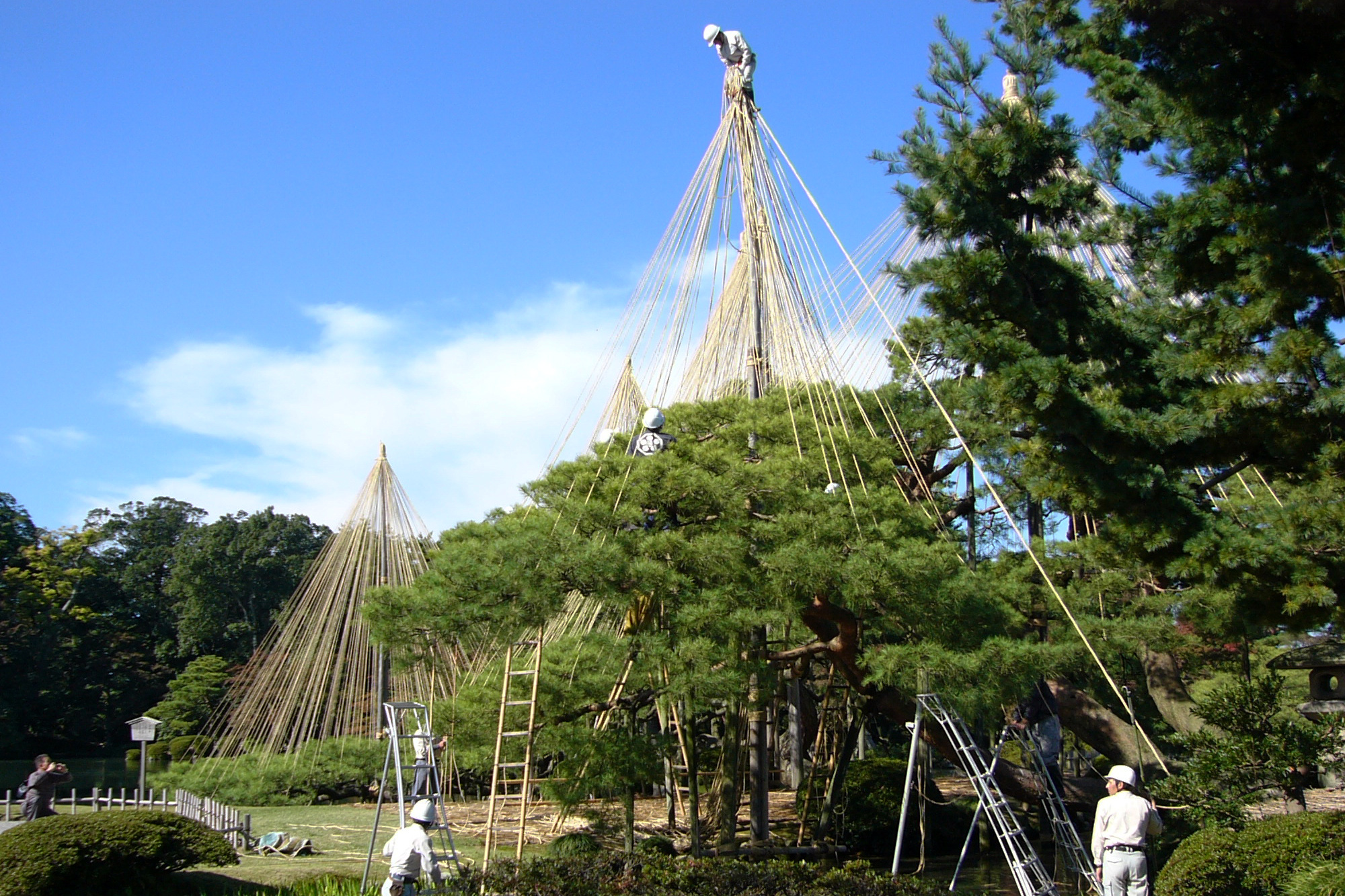
Yukitsuri being set up, Kenrokuen Garden

Yukitsuri (Japanese: 雪つり) is a Japanese technique for preserving trees and shrubs from heavy snow. Trees are given extra support by bamboo poles with ropes attached to limbs; whereas, shrubs are often tied tightly around the circumference. Yukitsuri is a common sight in Kanazawa and Kenrokuen Garden during the winter months.

Yukitsuri can also be seen in Hibiya Park, Jindai Botanical Garden, Yoyogi Park and Inokashira Park in Tokyo. Tokyo no longer receives much snow, but the yukitsuri now function more as seasonal markers.
