= Kenroku-en =

Park in Kanazawa, Ishikawa, Japan

- 兼六園
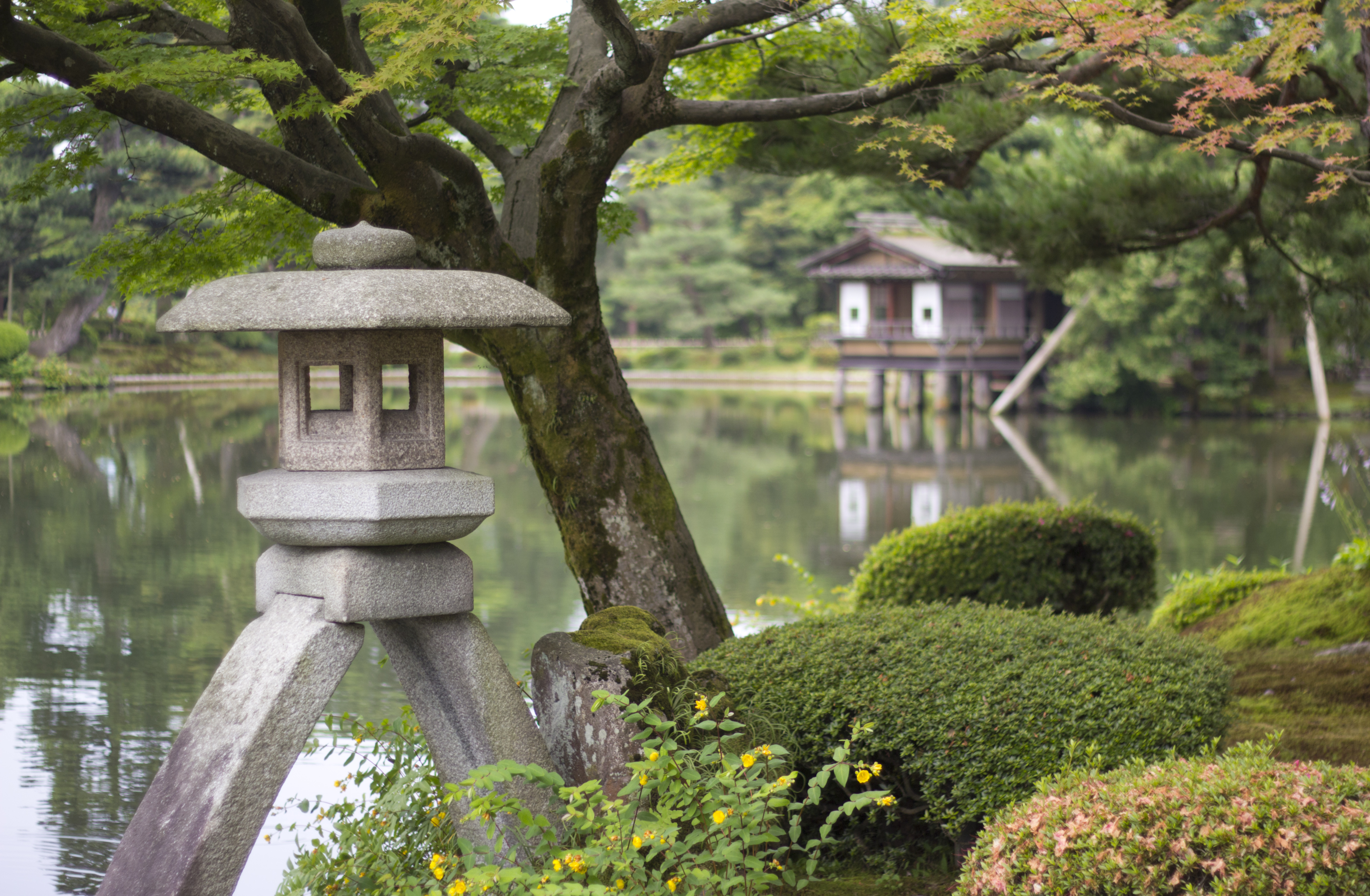
- The Kotoji-tōrō, a two-legged stone lantern that is one of the most well-known symbols of the Kenrokuen

- Location within Japan Location within Chubu region Location within Ishikawa Prefecture
- Type: Japanese garden
- Location: Kanazawa, Ishikawa, Japan
- Coordinates: 36°33′43″N 136°39′45″E
- Created: 1620s

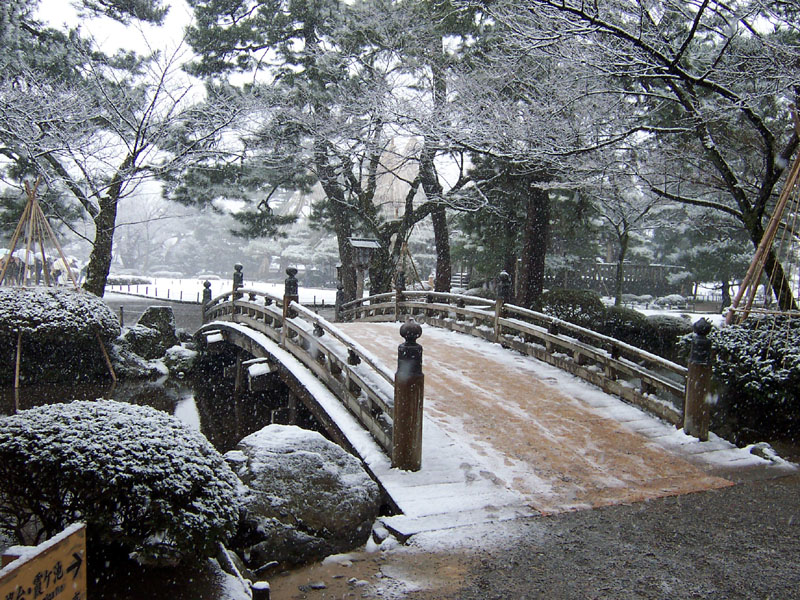
Flower-viewing Bridge, December 2004.

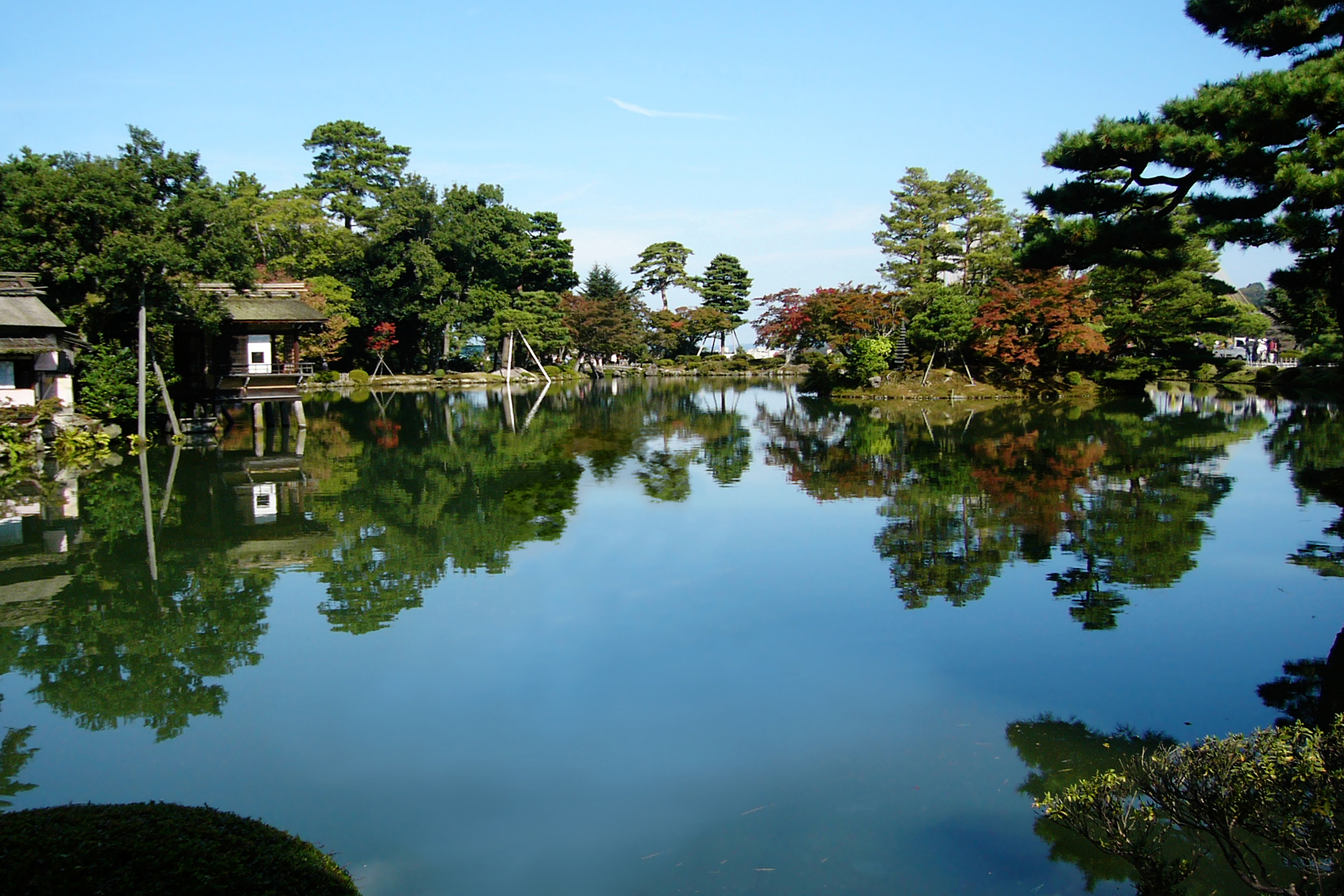
Kasumi Pond, November 2005.

Kenroku-en (Japanese: 兼六園; Garden of Six Attributes), located in Kanazawa, Ishikawa, Japan, is a strolling style garden constructed during the Edo period by the Maeda clan. Along with Kairaku-en and Kōraku-en, Kenroku-en is considered one of the Three Great Gardens of Japan and is noted for its beauty across all seasons, particularly in winter. Spread over nearly 25 acres, features of the landscape include meandering paths, a large pond, several tea houses, and one of Japan's oldest fountains. First opening to the public in 1871, the garden was later designated a National Site of Scenic Beauty in 1922, and subsequently received status as a National Site of Special Scenic Beauty in 1985. The grounds are open through paid admission year-round during daylight hours.

== History ==
Kenroku-en was developed from the 1620s to the 1840s by the Maeda clan, the daimyōs (feudal lords) who ruled the former Kaga Domain.

While the date of initial development of the garden that would become known as Kenrokuen is rather unclear, one version of the garden's origins can perhaps be marked by the completion of the Tatsumi water channel in 1632 by Maeda Toshitsune, the third daimyō of the powerful Maeda clan and ruler of the Kaga Domain from 1605 to 1639, as this feature would be later incorporated into creating the garden's twisting waterways in 1822.

Conversely, in other versions of the garden's inception, it is said to have originated when the 5th daimyō Tsunanori [r. 1645–1723] built in 1676 the Renchiochin house on the slope facing Kanazawa Castle, and gave its garden the name Renchitei (蓮池庭, lotus pond), also spelled Renchi-tei. The garden is located outside the gates of Kanazawa Castle where it originally formed the outer garden, and covers 114,436.65 m^{2} (over 25 acres). It began in 1676 when the 5th daimyō Maeda Tsunanori moved his administration to the castle and began to landscape a garden in this vicinity. This garden was, however, destroyed by the fire in 1759.

Not much is known about Renchitei in the years after it was named, principally as about eighty years after its creation, nearly the entire garden was destroyed by a massive fire in 1759. However, it is known from documents of the period that before the fire, the garden was often used and enjoyed by successive lords and retainers for "different banquet occasions such as viewing the moon ... enjoying colorful maples", and for admiring horses. Furthermore, local legend suggests that the Sacred Well of Kenroku-en – arguably the oldest object in the garden if the legend is true – suggests that:

1,200 years ago a peasant named Togoro stopped to wash his potatoes at the well. Suddenly, flakes of gold began to bubble up from the well, giving Kanazawa – meaning 'Marsh of Gold' – its name. Water from the well runs to the purification basin at the nearby Shinto shrine, and many people come to the Sacred Well for water for the tea ceremony.

The Shigure-tei teahouse – constructed in 1725 – miraculously survived the fire of 1759, and it offers evidence that not only was the tea ceremony present before the fire, but more importantly so was the culture associated with this elaborate ritual as it had a significant effect on garden design. Following the fire, the teahouse continued to be used and was completely restored during the Meiji period. It can still be seen today in the Renchitei section of the garden.

=== Kaiseki Pagoda ===
Another object that existed in or around the garden before the fire of 1759 was the Kaiseki Pagoda (海石塔, Kaiseki-tō), which is currently situated in Kenroku-en on an island near the center of Hisago Pond (瓢池, Hisago-ike). Not only is this object of considerable interest due to the theories which suggest its origin, but it also requires extra consideration due to the fact it "was erected by the third lord Toshitsune" who lived from 1594 to 1658, as it provides evidence that perhaps it predates the initial creation of Renchitei. Of course, this depends upon one's interpretation regarding both when the garden was initially created, along with the two theories regarding its origin. The first theory suggests it was formerly part of a "13-tiered pagoda that was once in the Gyokusen-in garden in Kanazawa Castle". The second theory suggests the pagoda was "brought back from Korea by Kato Kiyomasa when he came back from a military incursion there, and that it was presented to Toyotomi Hideyoshi, and then passed on by him to the first lord Maeda Toshiie". Since these military incursions by Kato Kiyomasa probably took place between 1592 and 1598, and as Hideyoshi died in 1598, if the second theory is true, then the pagoda probably entered Japan and into the hands of Maeda Toshiie between 1592 and 1598. Moreover, both theories regarding its origin could be true, which could propose a third theory behind the pagoda's origin. It is possible that Maeda Toshiie received from Hideyoshi a 13-tiered pagoda, placed it in Gyokusen-in garden in Kanazawa Castle, and a subsequent daimyō placed the pagoda where it stands today in its current form. However, as there isn't any evidence suggesting this third theory, this claim cannot be substantiated.

The garden restoration was begun in 1774 by the 11th daimyō Harunaga, who created the Emerald Waterfall (Midori-taki) and Yugao-tei (夕顔亭), a teahouse. Improvements continued in 1822 when the 12th daimyō Narinaga created the garden's winding streams with water drawn from the Tatsumi Waterway. The 13th daimyō Nariyasu subsequently added more streams and expanded the Kasumi Pond. With this, the garden's current form was complete. The garden was opened to the public on May 7, 1874.

== The Six Attributes ==
The garden was named by Matsudaira Sadanobu in 1822 and literally translates as "Combined" (Ken) "Six" (roku) "Garden" (en) to mean the "Garden of Six Attributes." Sadanobu drew inspiration from the classical Chinese text "Chronicles of the Famous Luoyang Gardens" (洛陽名園記), which outlined the six attributes of a perfect landscape: spaciousness, seclusion, artifice, antiquity, waterways, and panoramas. Attaining all six within one landscape was said to be difficult because they form contrasting pairs:

There are six features that make a garden outstanding. If one tries to introduce an impression of vastness, any atmosphere of quietude and intimacy will be lost; if artificial elements are introduced, any impression of antiquity will be weakened; if a lot of flowing water is introduced, distant views are not possible.

The landscape design and layout of Kenroku-en can be interpreted to demonstrate how it overcomes the challenge of these contrasting attributes, and achieves balance of all six to represent an ideal landscape. Certain areas of the garden, like those around Kasumige-ike Pond, lend themselves to a sense of openness, while other areas, such as those around Tokiwaoka Hill, create a sense of seclusion. Artificial elements of bridges, lanterns, and pagodas were designed to fit seamlessly into the surrounding natural elements of rock, plants, and water. Panoramic viewpoints within the garden overlook the Japan Sea and Iozan mountains, while simultaneously allowing views of many of the garden's water features.

== Features ==
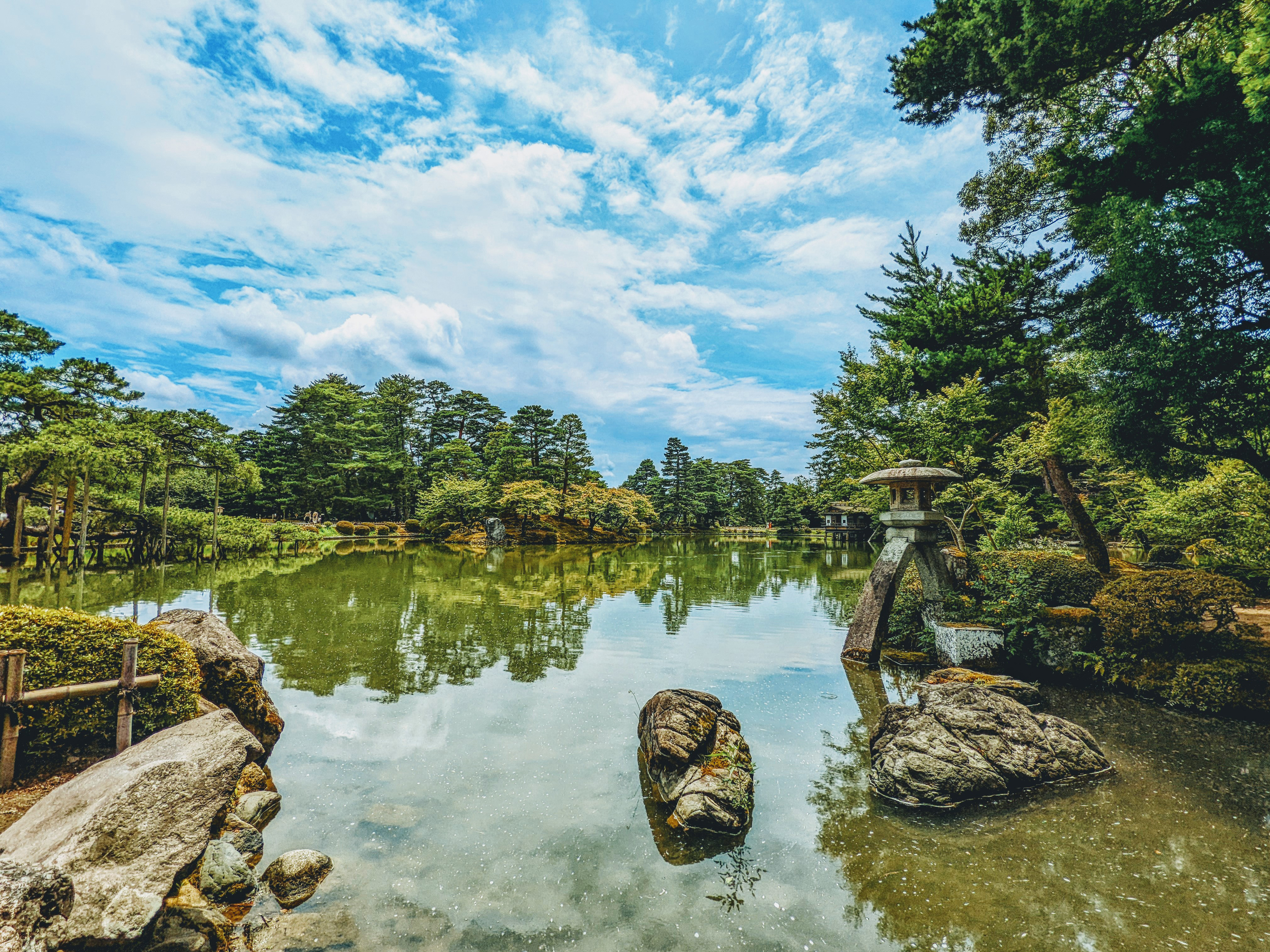
Summer view of Kotoji-toro in Kenroku-en, Kanazawa, Ishikawa Prefecture, Japan (2022).

Kenroku-en contains roughly 8,750 trees, and 183 species of plants in total. Among the garden's points of special interest are

- the oldest fountain in Japan, operating by natural water pressure.
- Yūgao-tei, a teahouse, the oldest building in the garden, built 1774
- Shigure-tei, a rest House that was originally built by the 5th lord Tsunanori, reconstructed at its present location in 2000
- Karasaki Pine, planted from seed by the 13th lord Nariyasu from Karasaki, near Lake Biwa.
- Kotoji-tōrō, a stone lantern with two legs, said to resemble the bridge on a koto. This lantern is emblematic of Kenroku-en and Kanazawa.
- Flying Geese Bridge (Gankō-bashi), made of eleven red stones, laid out to resemble geese in a flying formation
- Kaiseki Pagoda, said to have been donated to the Maeda by Toyotomi Hideyoshi

In winter, the park is notable for its yukitsuri — ropes attached in a conical array to carefully support tree branches in the desired arrangements, thereby protecting the trees from damage caused by heavy snows.

== Gallery ==
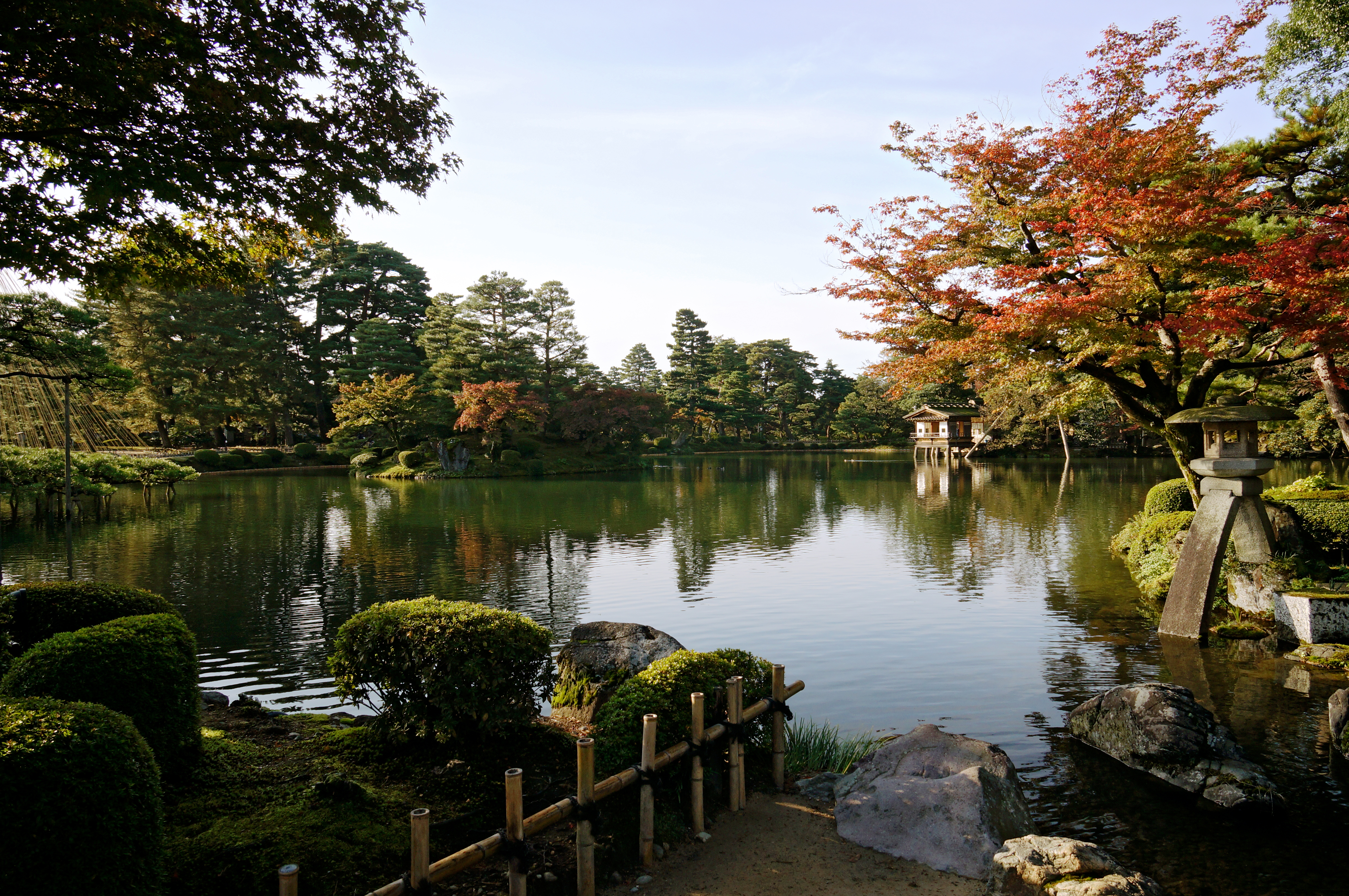
Autumn image of Kasumi Pond and Kotoji-tōrō Lantern.

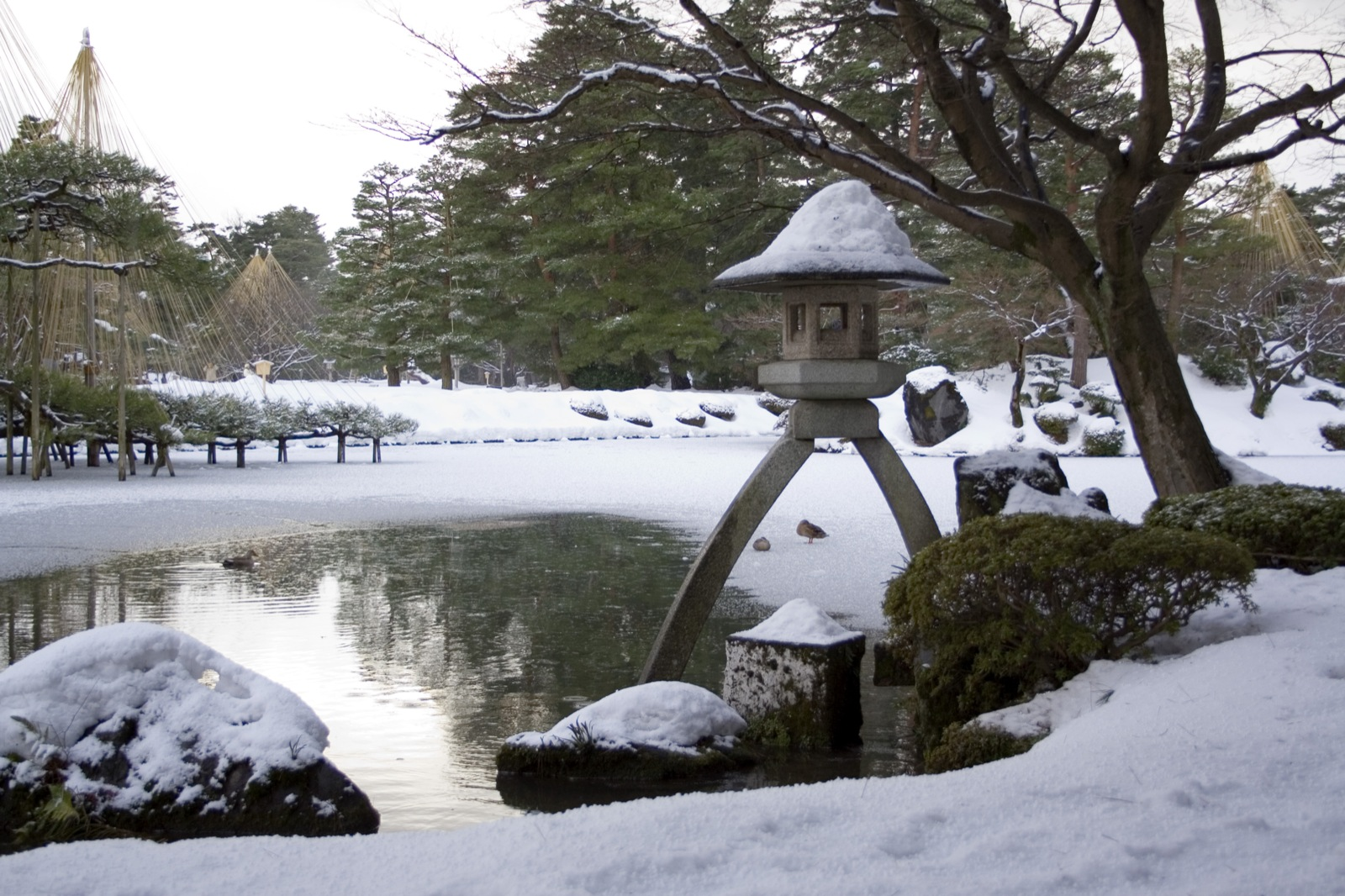
Winter image of Kasumi Pond and Kotoji-tōrō Lantern.

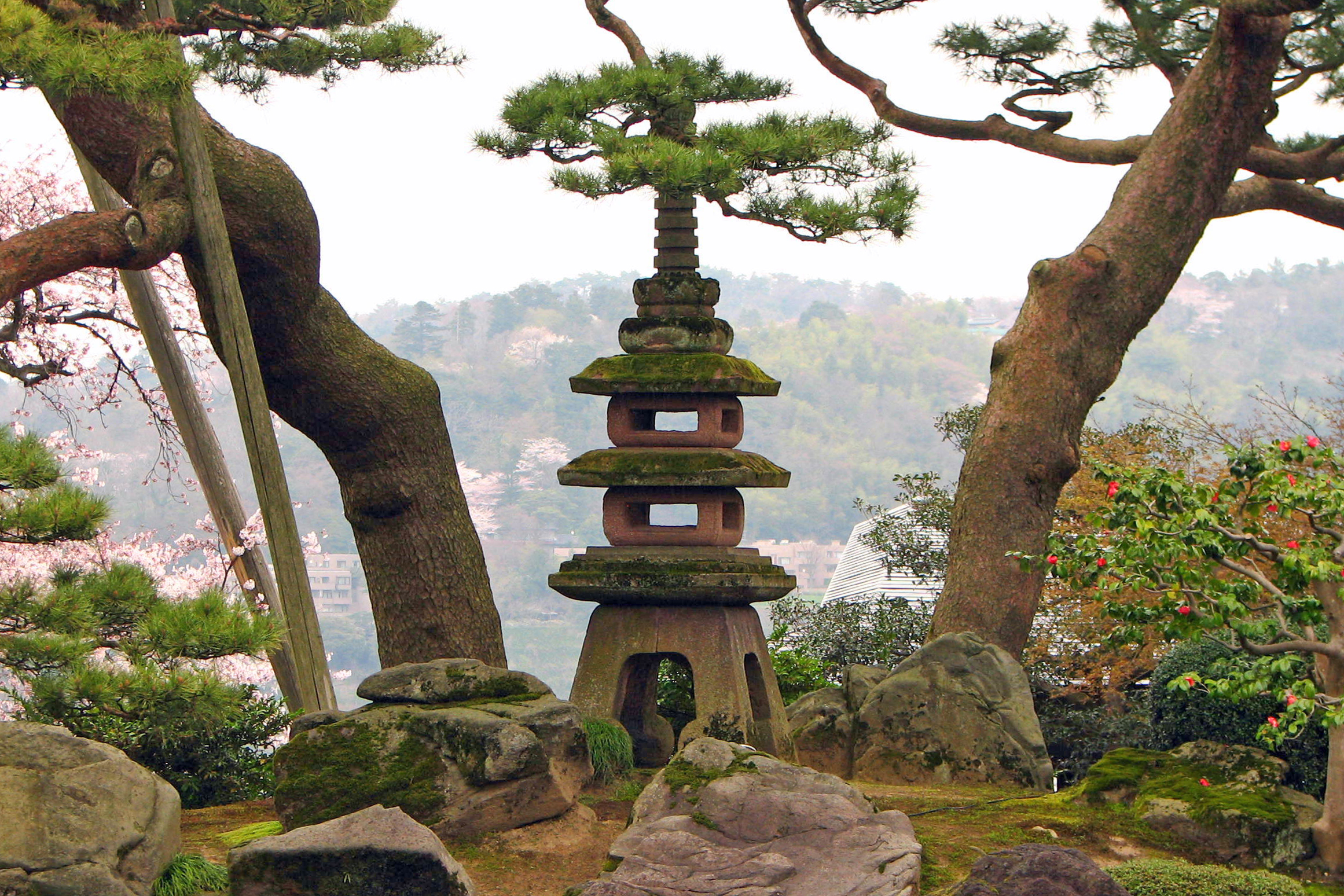
Lantern

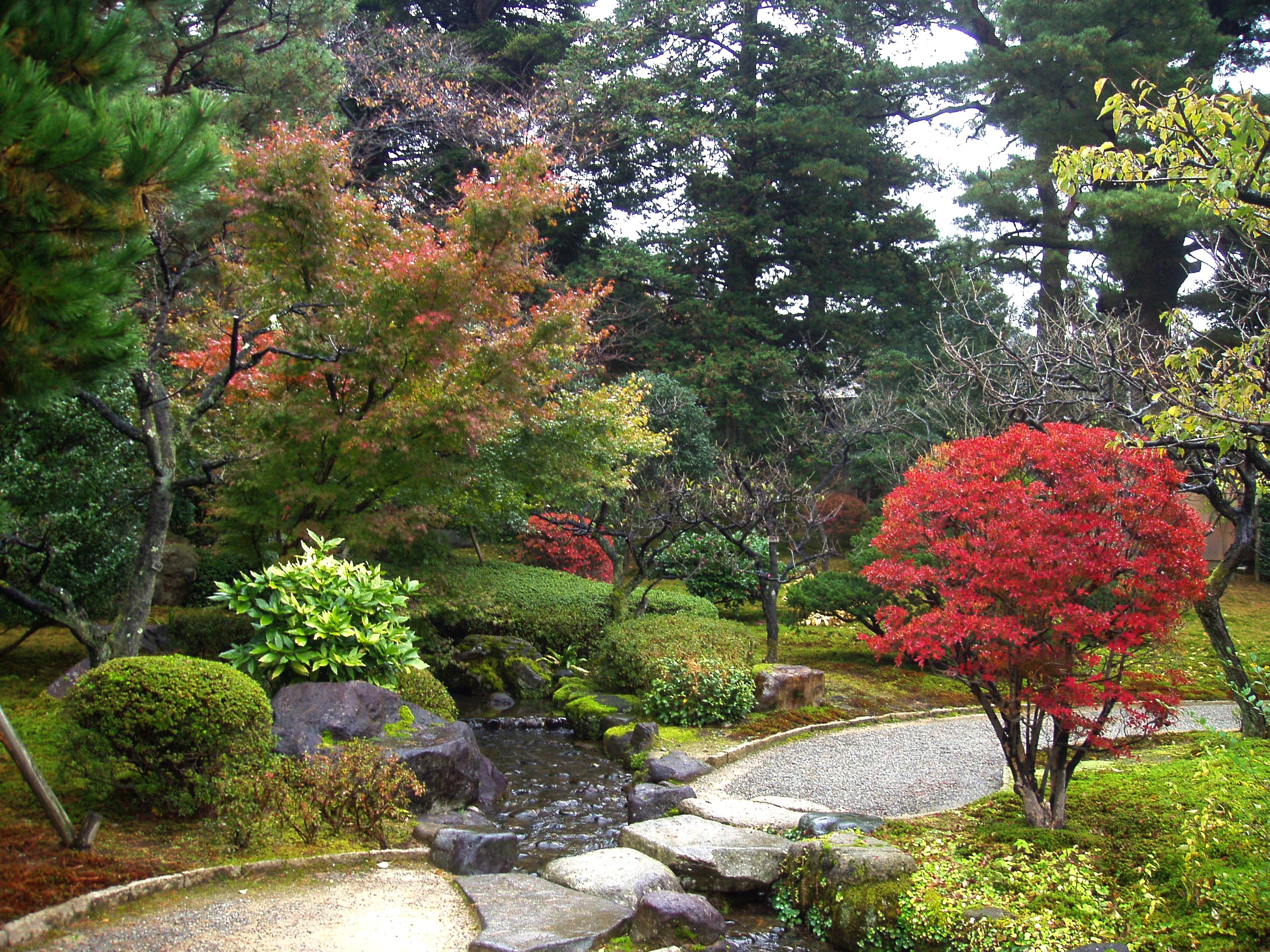
Path and waterway, mid November.

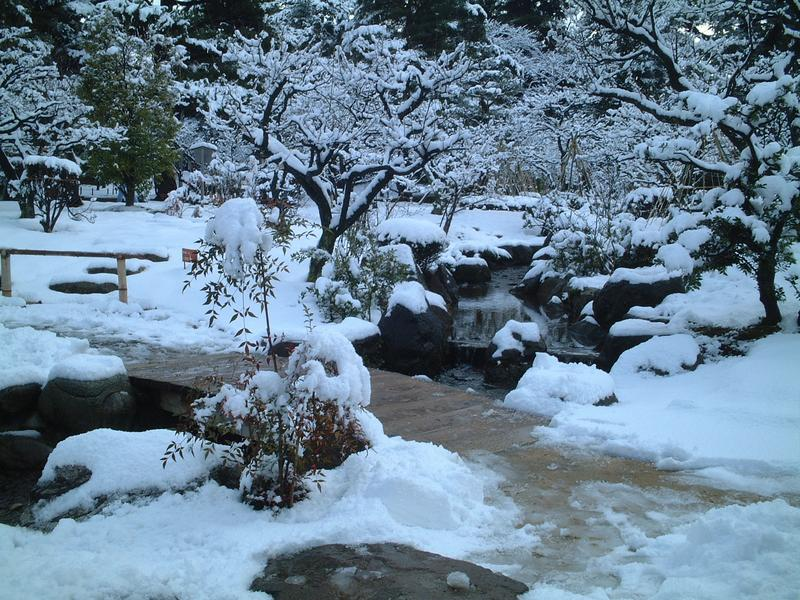
Kenroku-en covered by snow.

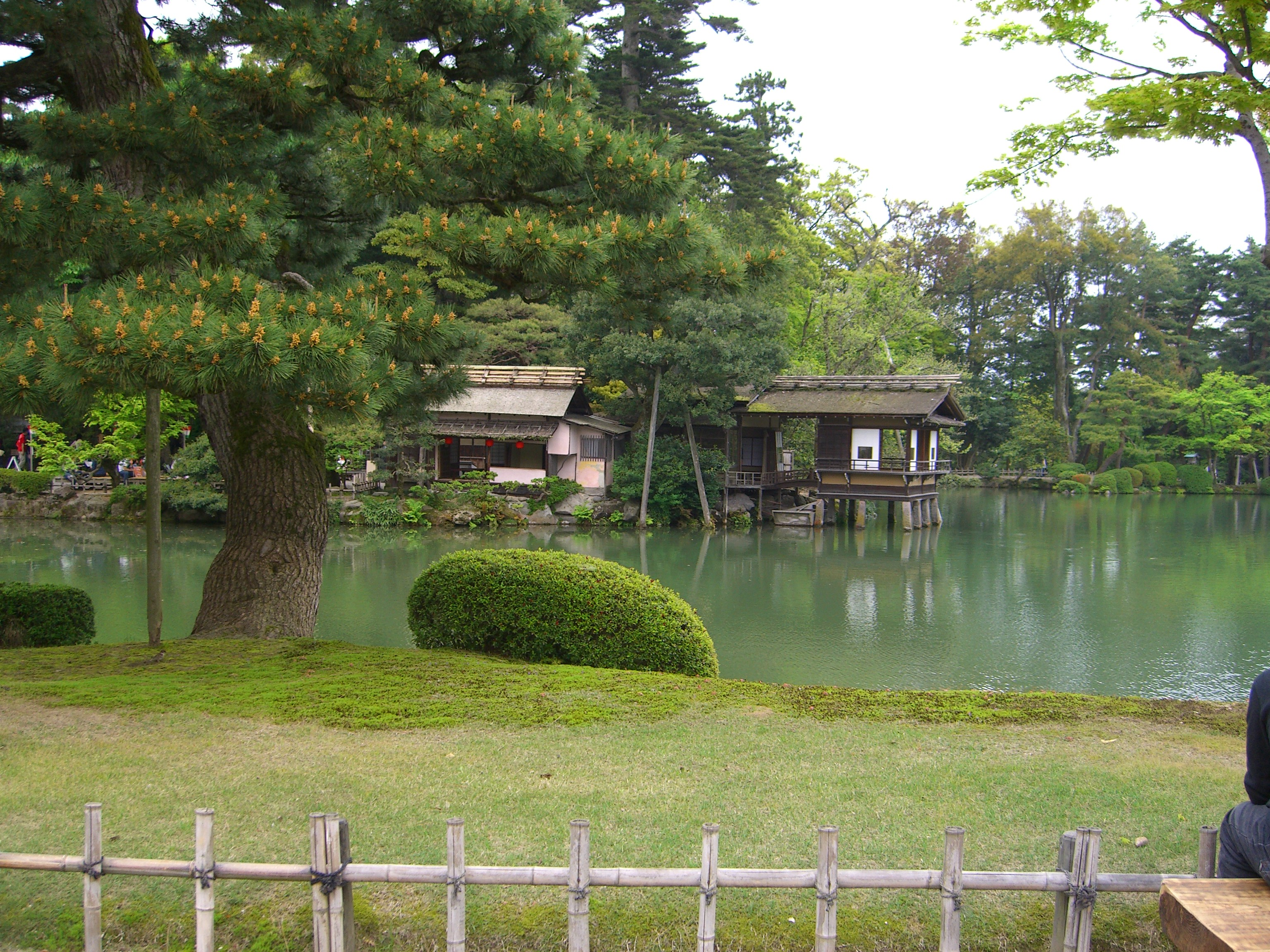
Uchihashi-tei Tea House, Kasumi Pond, early May.

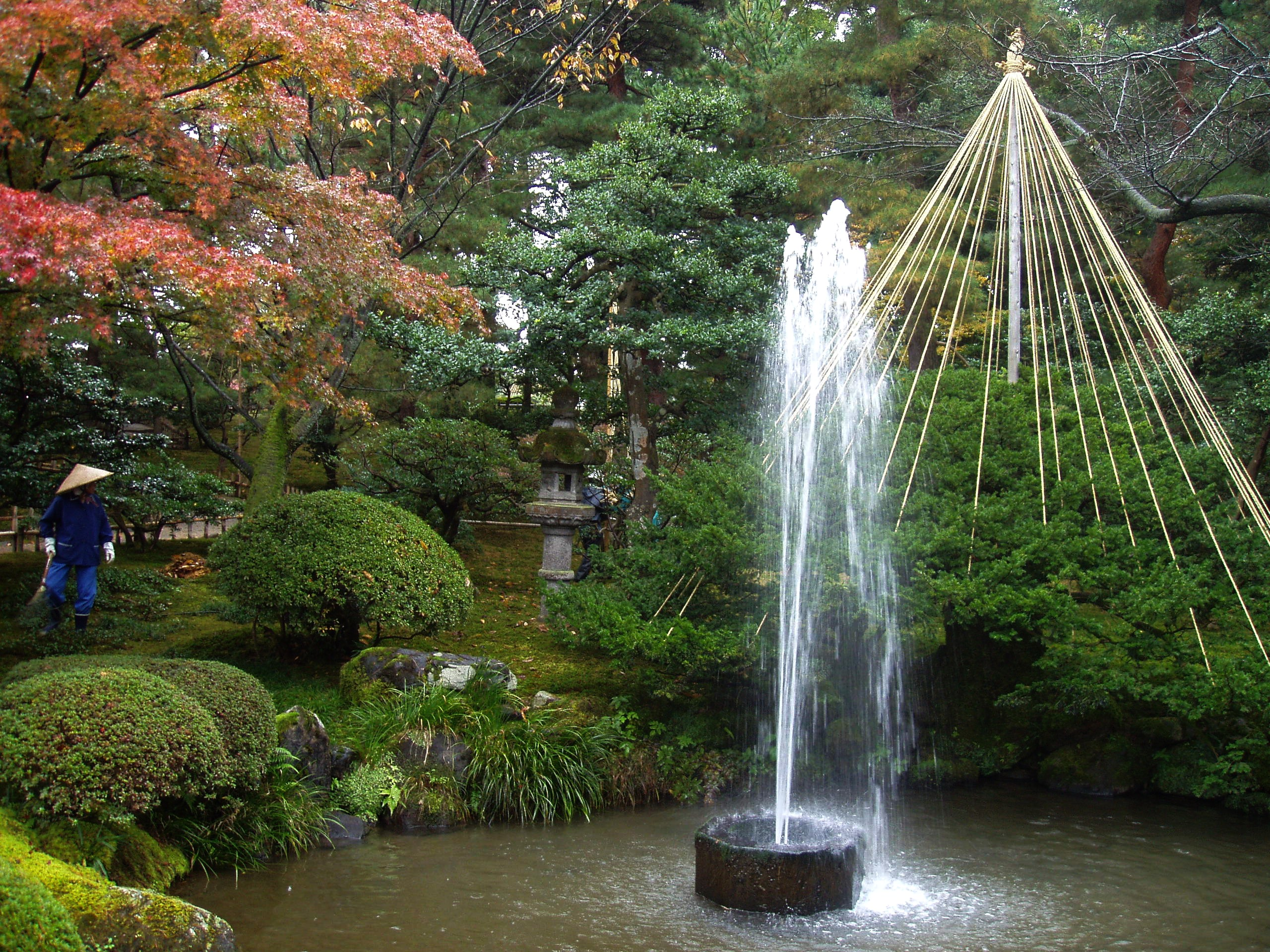
Fountain, mid November.

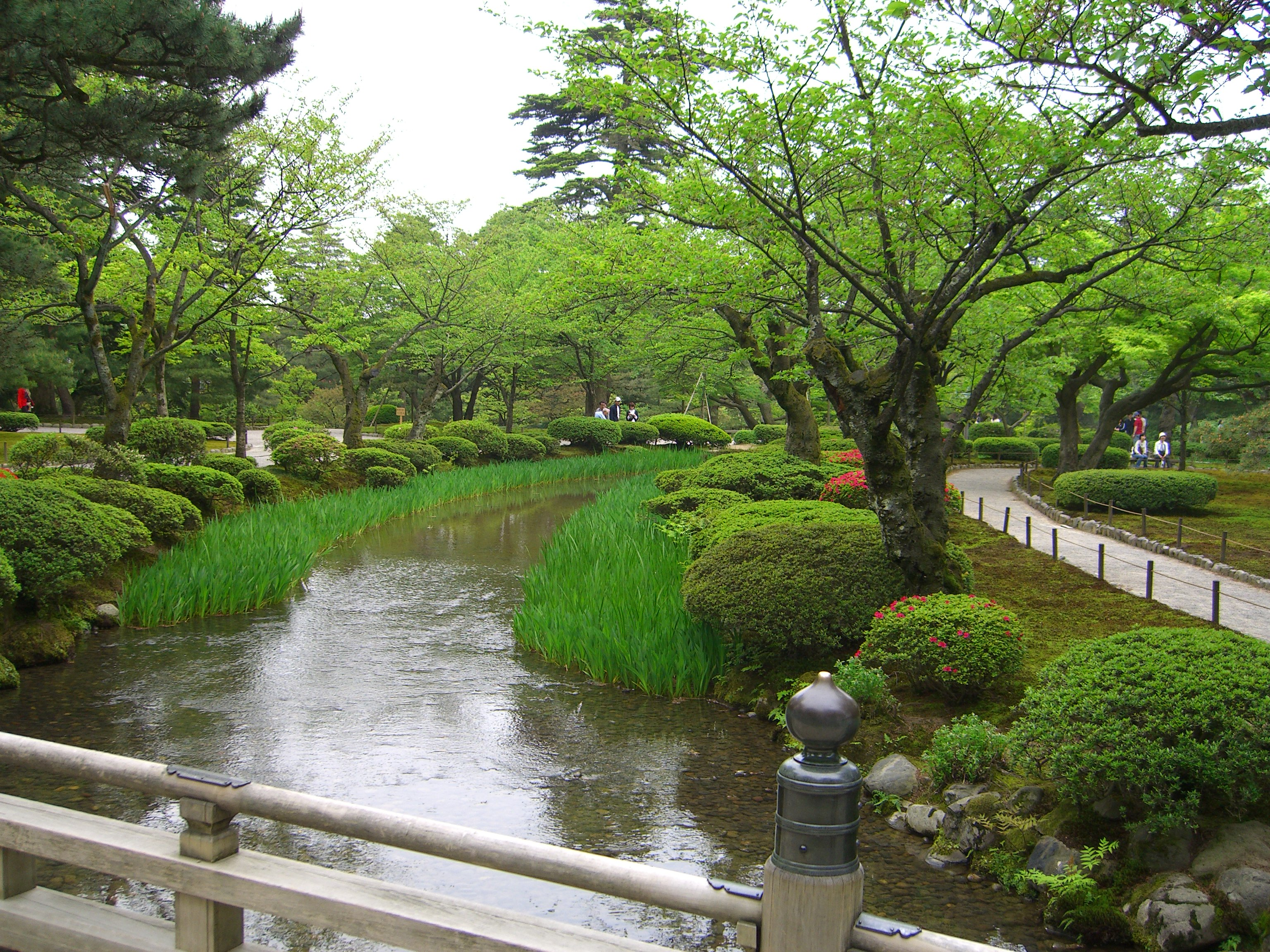
A view from the Flower-viewing Bridge, early May.

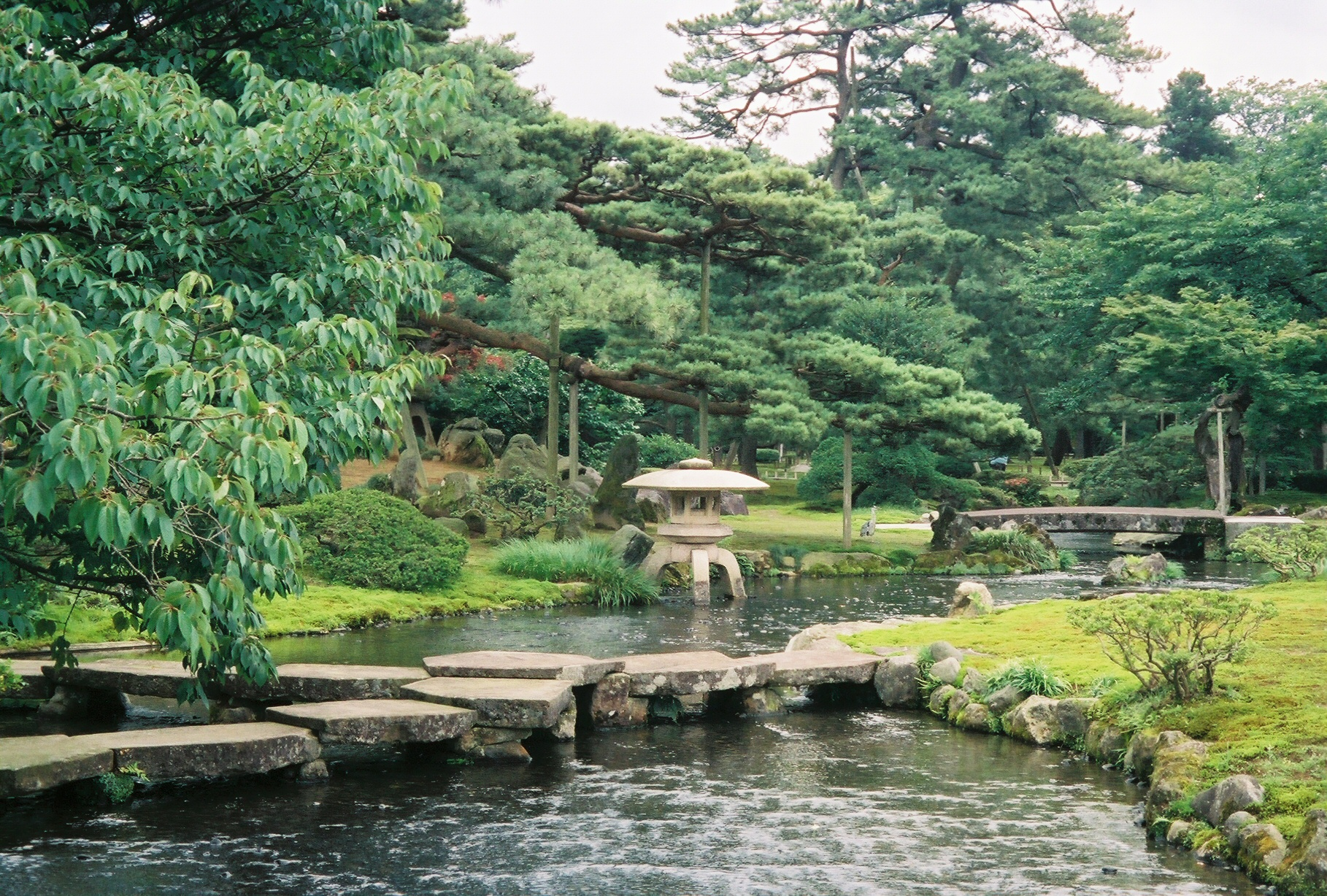
Flying Geese Bridge

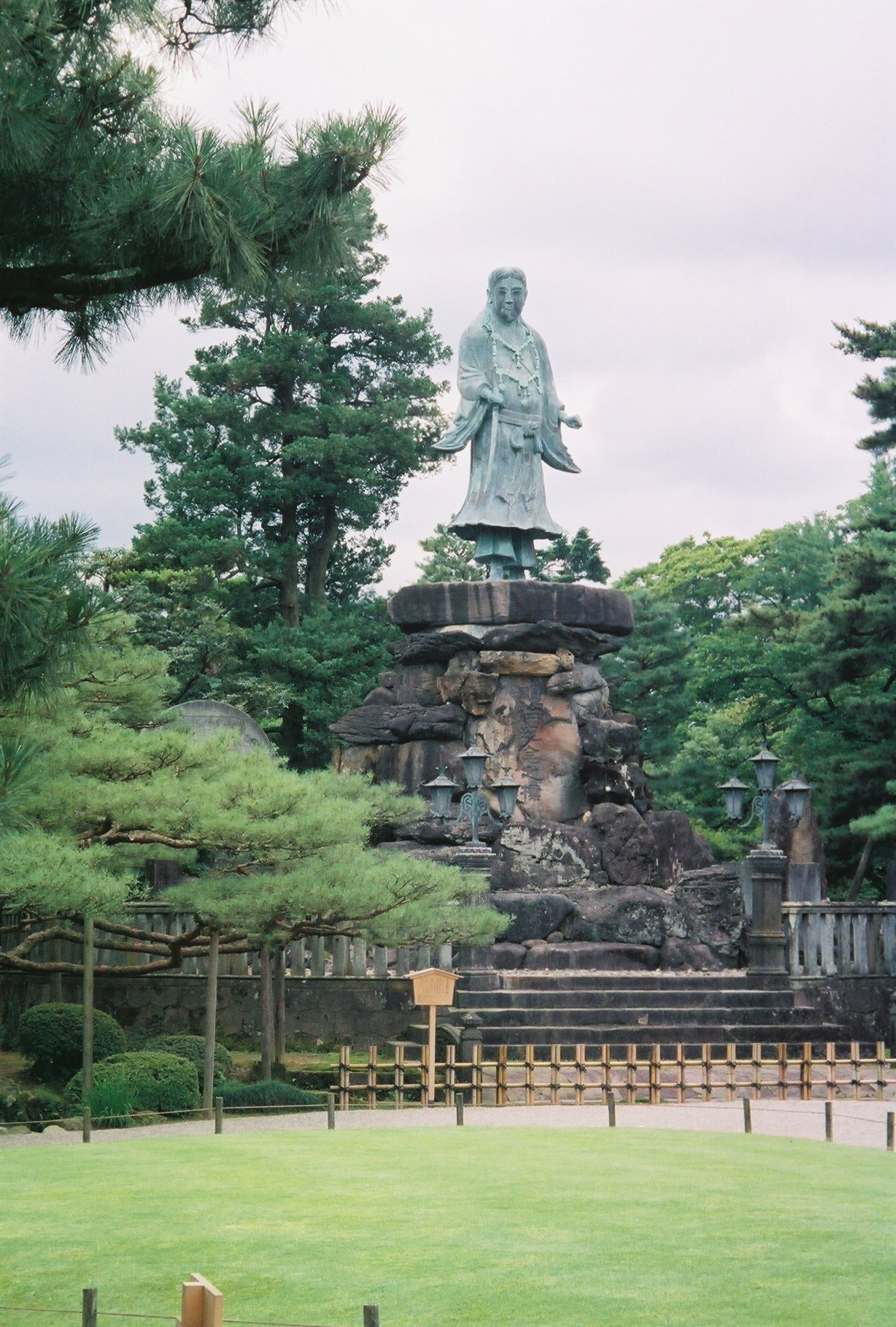
Statue of Yamato Takeru

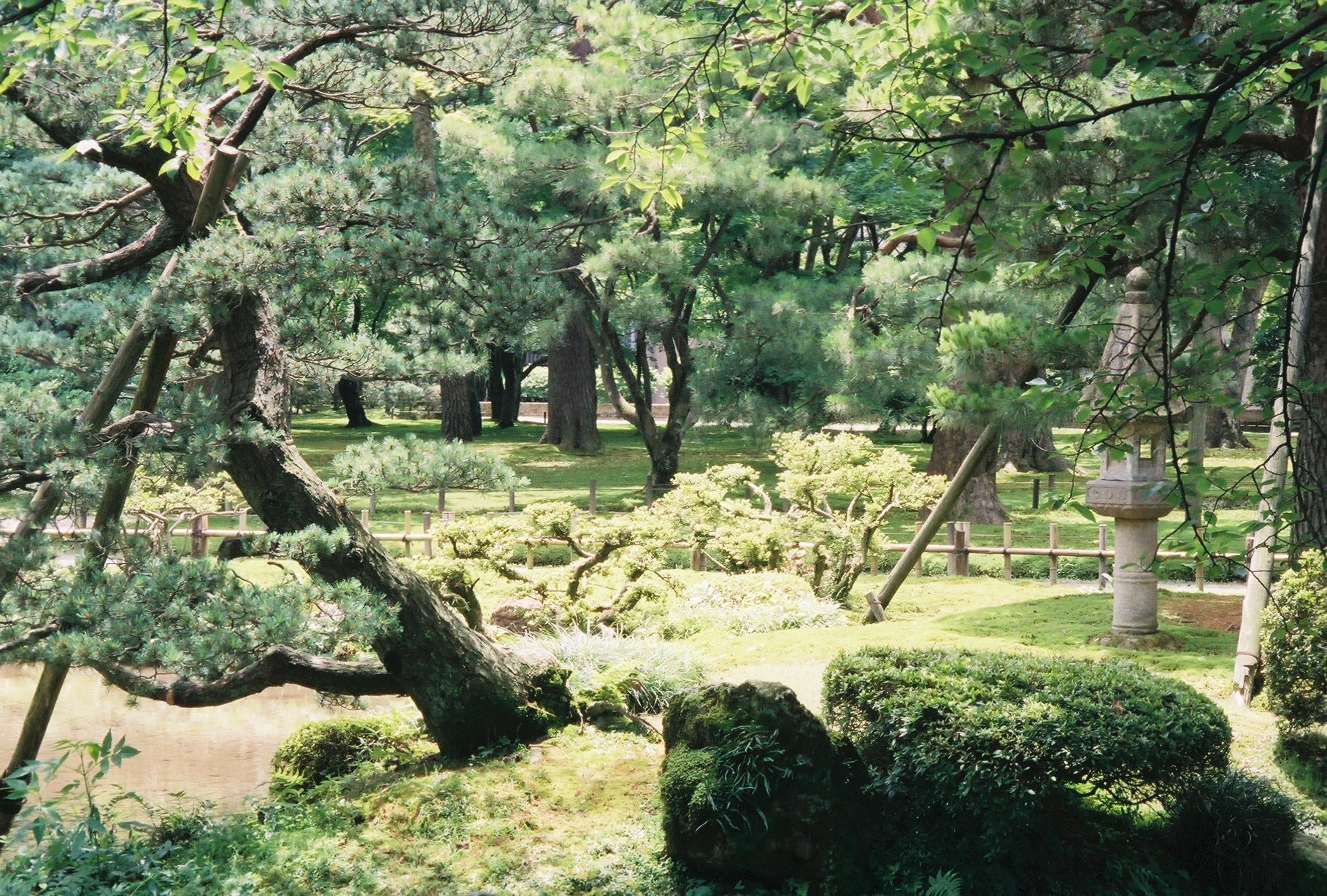
Pines and lanterns

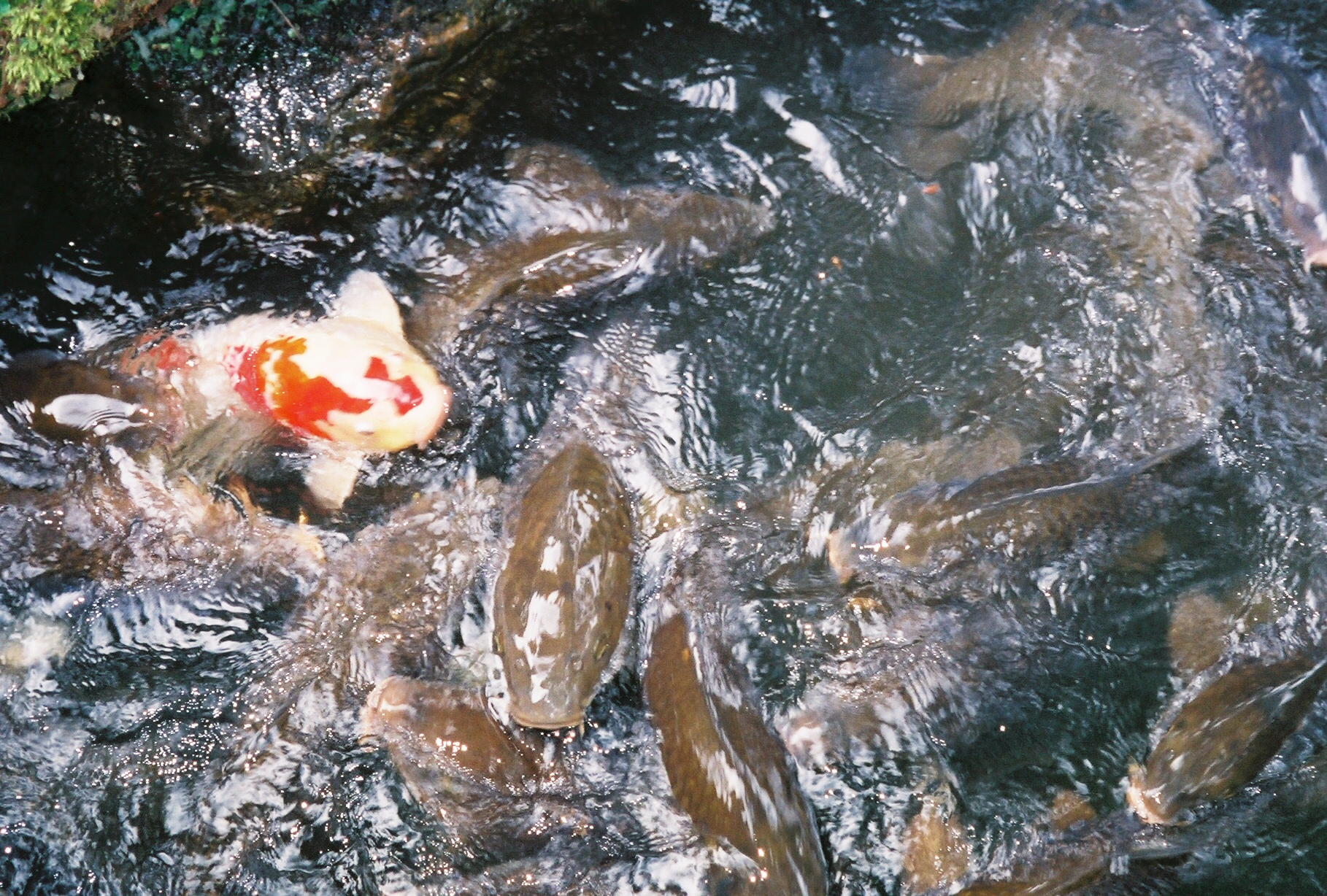
Koi jostle together, hoping for food.

A few selected scenes from inside the park, 2012

A couple admires the garden in April.

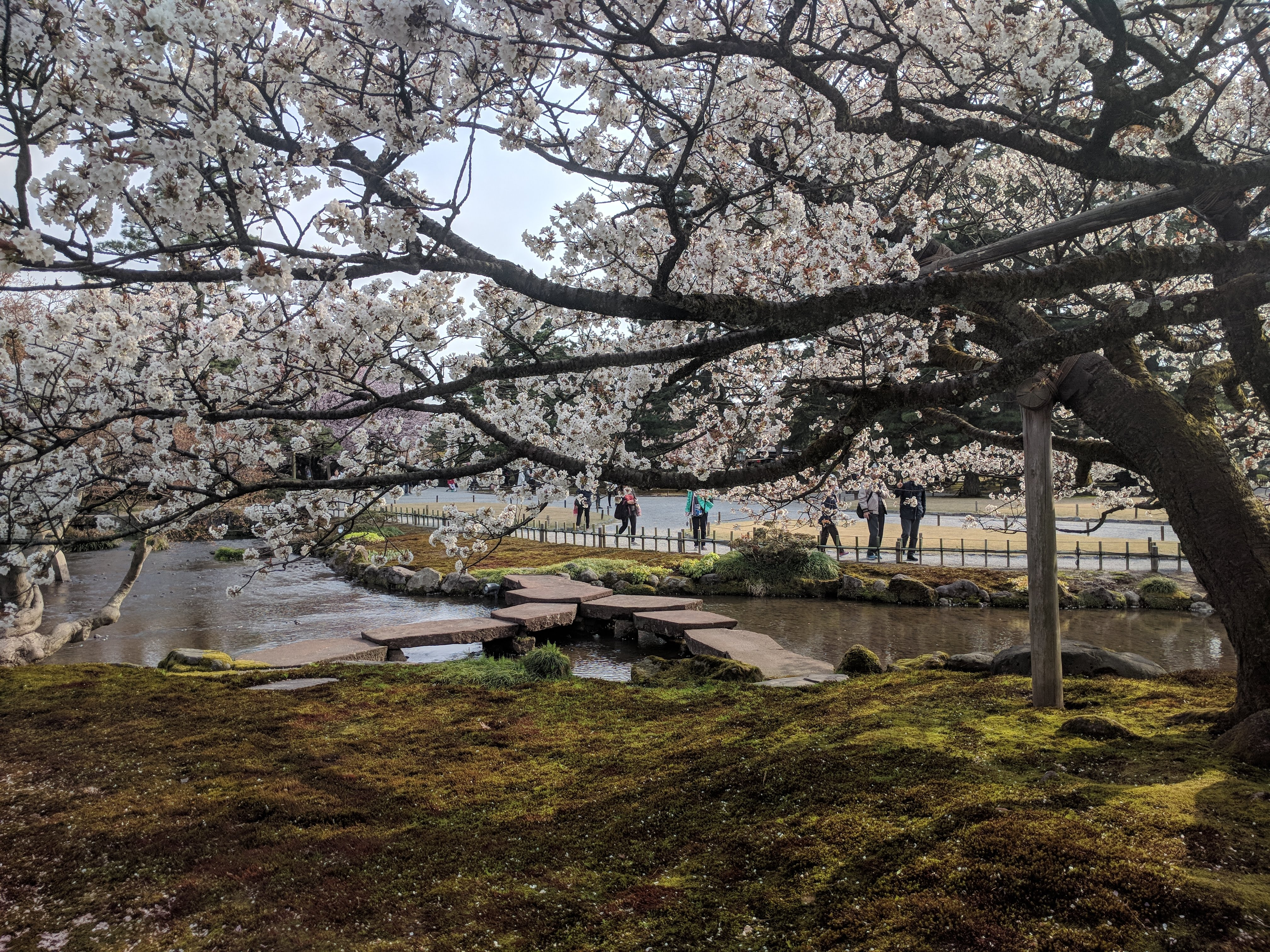
Flying Geese Bridge under blossoming tree in April.

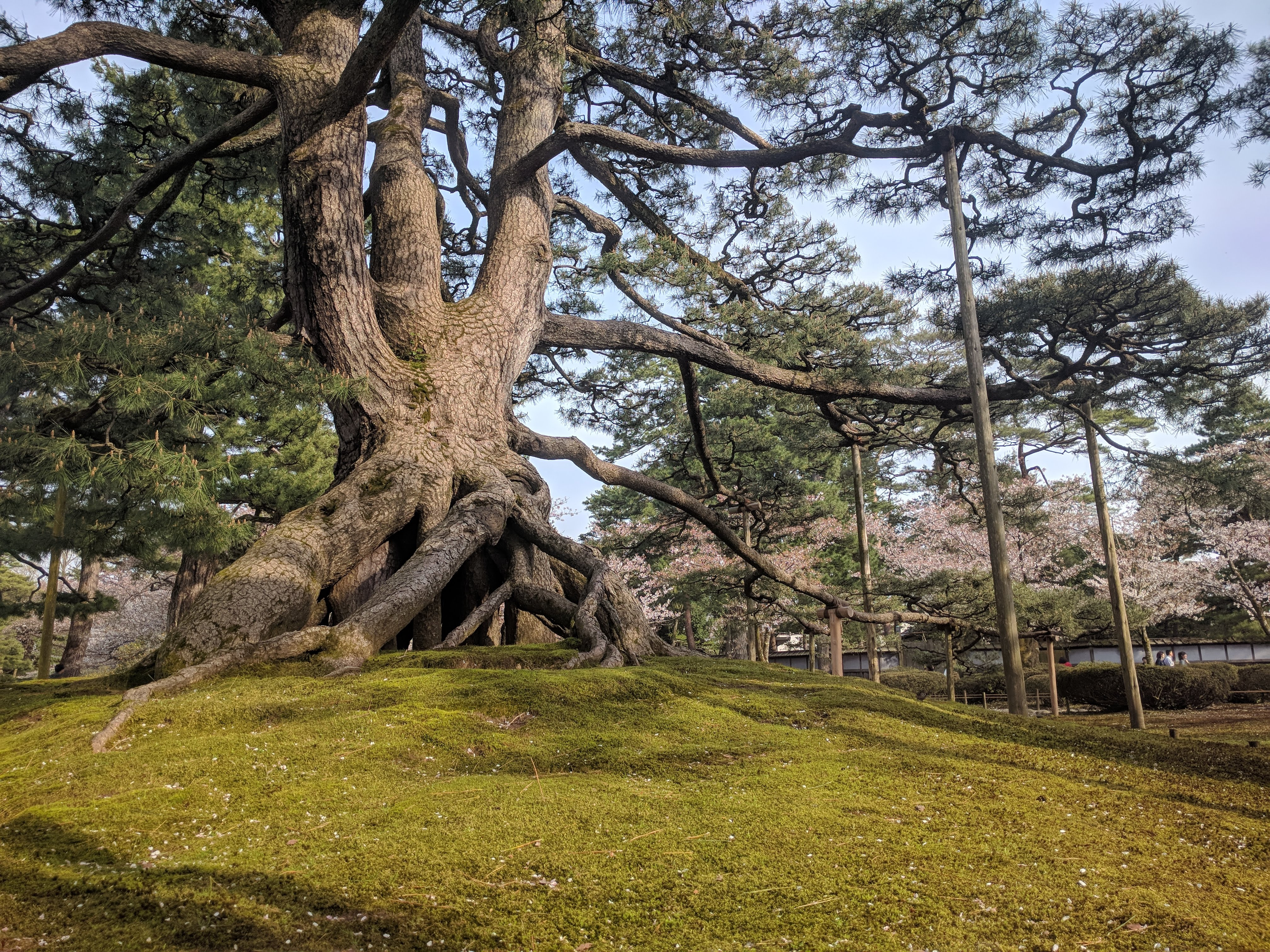
Neagari-no-matsu (pine with raised roots)

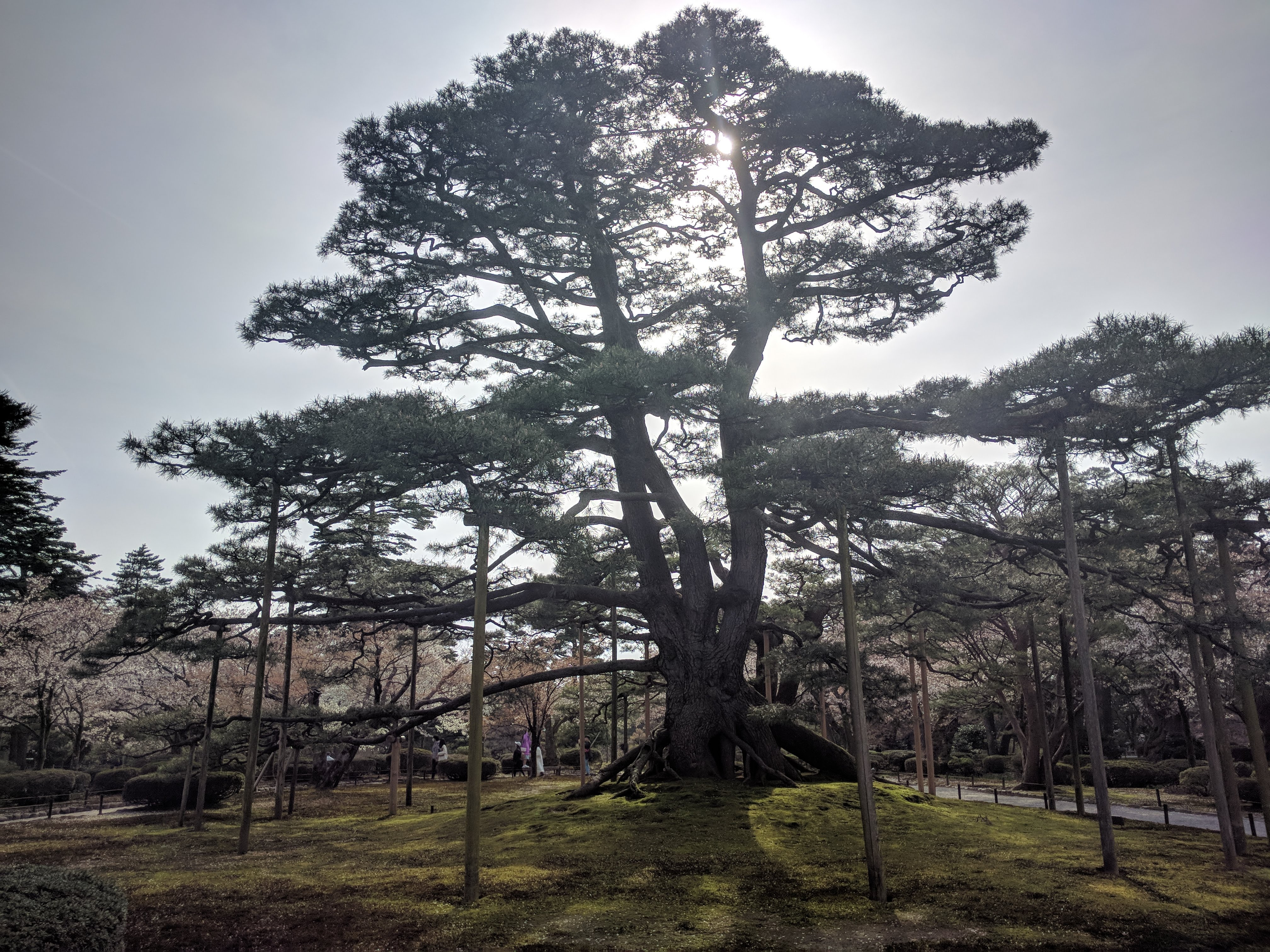
Neagari-no-matsu (pine with raised roots)

== See also ==
- List of Special Places of Scenic Beauty, Special Historic Sites and Special Natural Monuments
