= Time Bell Tower =

- 時の鐘
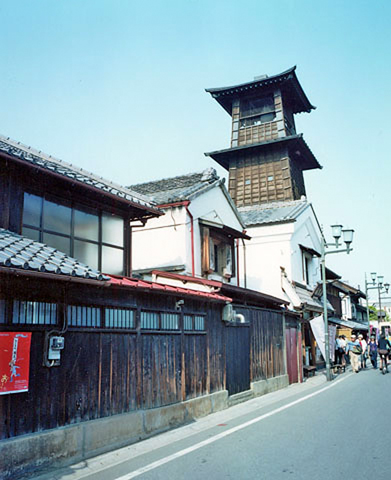
- Time Bell Tower in Kawagoe, Japan
- Interactive map of the Time Bell Tower area

General information
- Location: 350-8601; 15-7 Saiwaicho, Kawagoe, Saitama
- Coordinates: 35°55′24.56″N 139°28′59.93″E
- Year built: 1894

Height
- Height: 16 meters

Technical details
- Floor count: 3

Time Bell Tower (Japanese: 時の鐘; Toki no Kane) is a bell tower built in the center of Kawagoe, Japan. It is considered the symbol of the city.

== Highlights ==
It is a landmark building and represents Kurazukuri Zone lined with old storehouses constructed in a style called Kurazukuri. It is a three-story tower measuring 16 meters in height with a bell kept inside. The bell is about 700 kg in weight, measuring about 130cm in length and 82 cm in diameter.

The present structure is the 4th generation and goes back to 1894, a year after the Great Fire of Kawagoe.

In old times, the bell was rung manually at specific times, though today it is rung mechanically four times a day. (6am,12pm,3pm,6pm)

It was designated as a tangible cultural asset by Kawagoe City in 1958, and it was also selected as one of “100 Soundscapes of Japan: Preserving Our Heritage” by the then-Environmental Agency (predecessor to the Ministry of the Environment (Japan)) in 1996.

The tower is adjacent to Yakushi Shrine which is believed to give efficacy to those suffering from illness, especially from eye diseases.

== History ==
The precise date of its construction is not known, but it is said that it was built between 1627 and 1634 (during the Kan'ei era in the Edo period) on the orders of Sakai Tadakatsu, the lord of Kawagoe Domain.

In 1639, Matsudaira Nobutsuna who took office as the lord of Kawagoe Domain found the original bell wrecked and not in use, and ordered to cast a new bell in 1653.

According to a topography named "Kawagoe Somen", further in 1704, the lord of Yamura (located in the present Tsuru City, Yamanashi Prefecture) named Akimoto Takatomo became the lord of Kawagoe Domain, who brought a bell which had been used in the castle town of Yamura to Kawagoe. This bell originally cast in 1694 by a local caster had a beautiful sound, and it’s said to have sounded differently before misfortune such as flood or earthquake took place. In 1733, a fire tower was put on the top of the bell tower with the increase in the number of houses to play a role as a fire bell.

In 1767, when Matsudaira Tomonori became the lord of Kawagoe Domain, the bell kept in the tower was the one made in 1653, not the one with a beautiful sound. Because that bell was in a damaged condition, a bell at a nearby temple came to be used. It was in 1849 when a new bell was cast after 73 years of absence of its original bell. Unfortunately, the new bell, long wanted by locals, did not sound well with a low sound, and again, a bell at a nearby temple came to be used.

In 1856, both the tower and the bell were burned by fire, and a new bell was cast in 1861. But again, the new bell was burned in 1893 by the Great Fire of Kawagoe, which burned 1,302 houses, nearly one-third of all the houses in the town.

The present tower was constructed in 1894, a year after the Great Fire of Kawagoe. In order to reconstruct the clock tower as the symbol of Kawagoe, leading local merchants collected contributions from successful business people from Kawagoe.

The reconstructed tower once stopped telling time during and after the war, and it was in 1975 when it resumed telling time by machine.

The tower went through renovations from 2015 to 2016 that cost 100 million yen to improve earthquake resistance.

== Image gallery ==
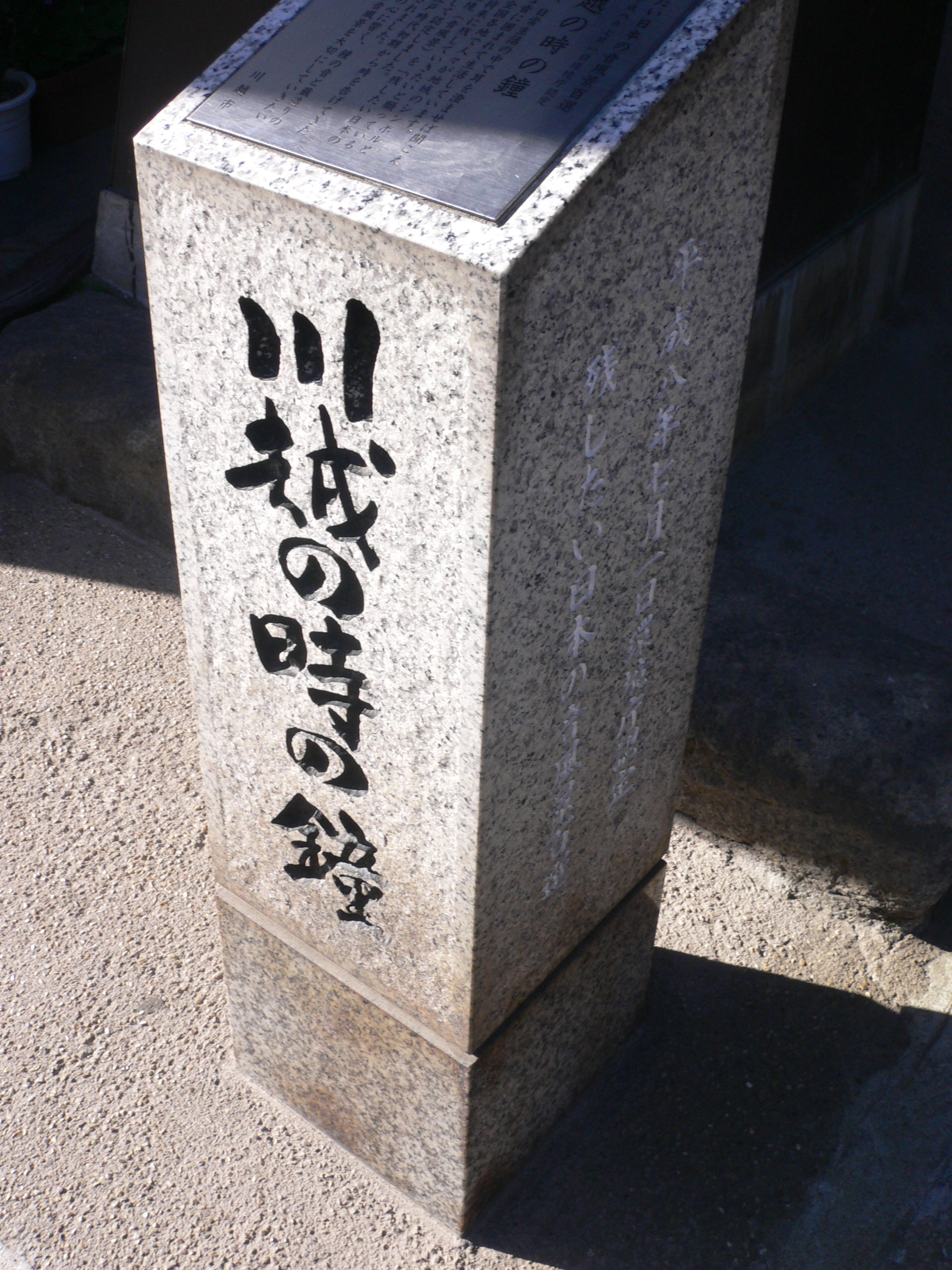

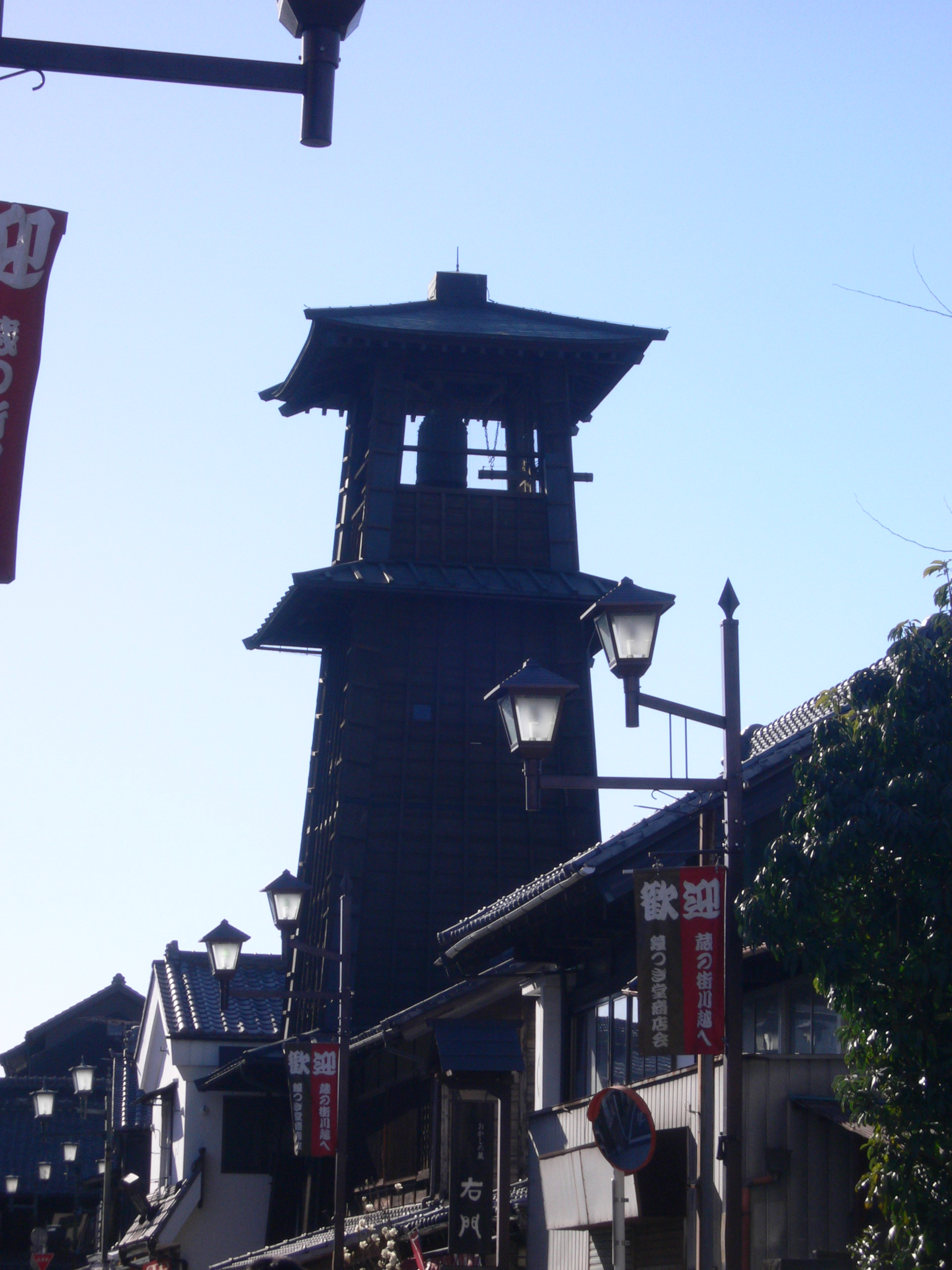

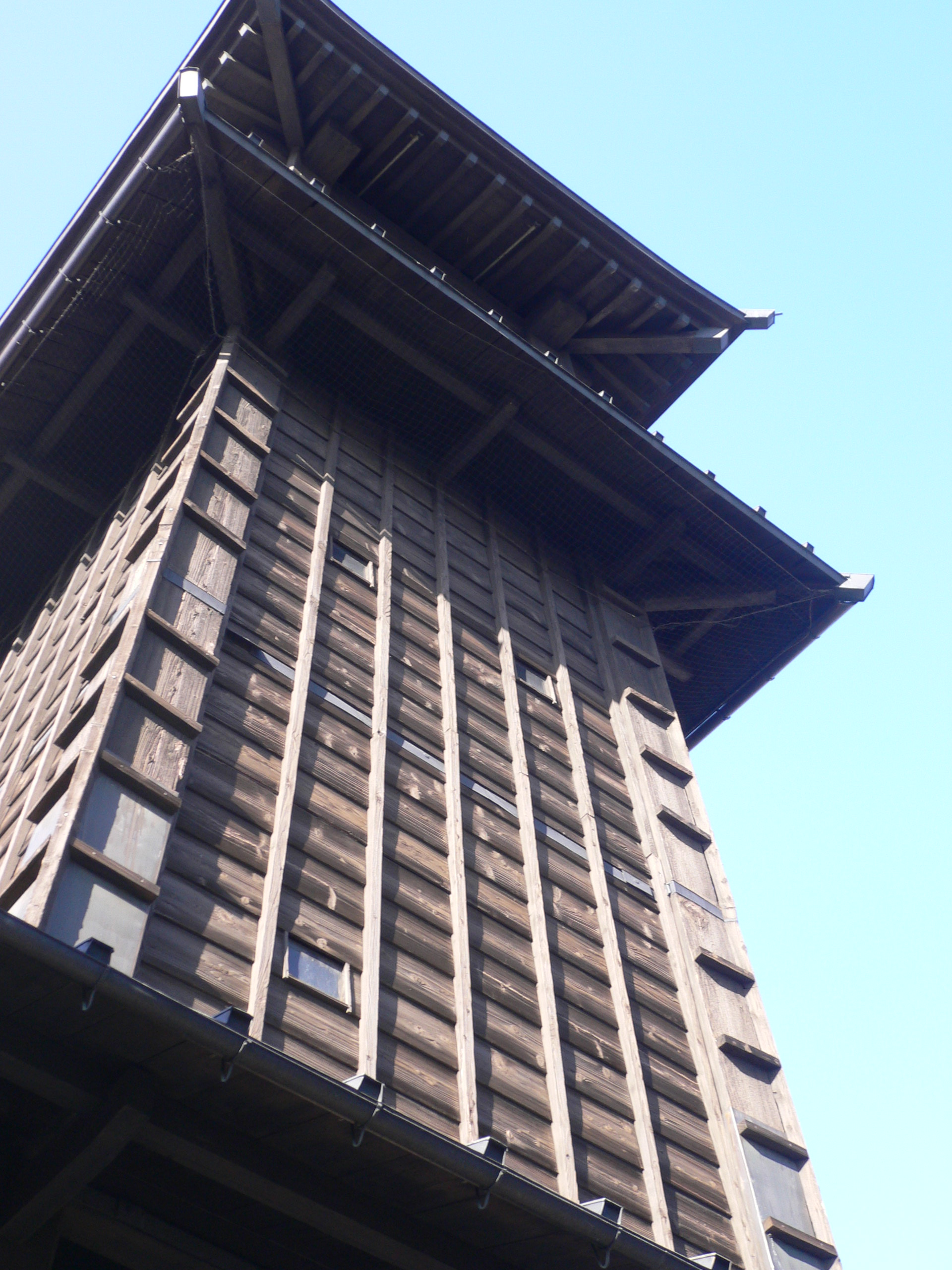

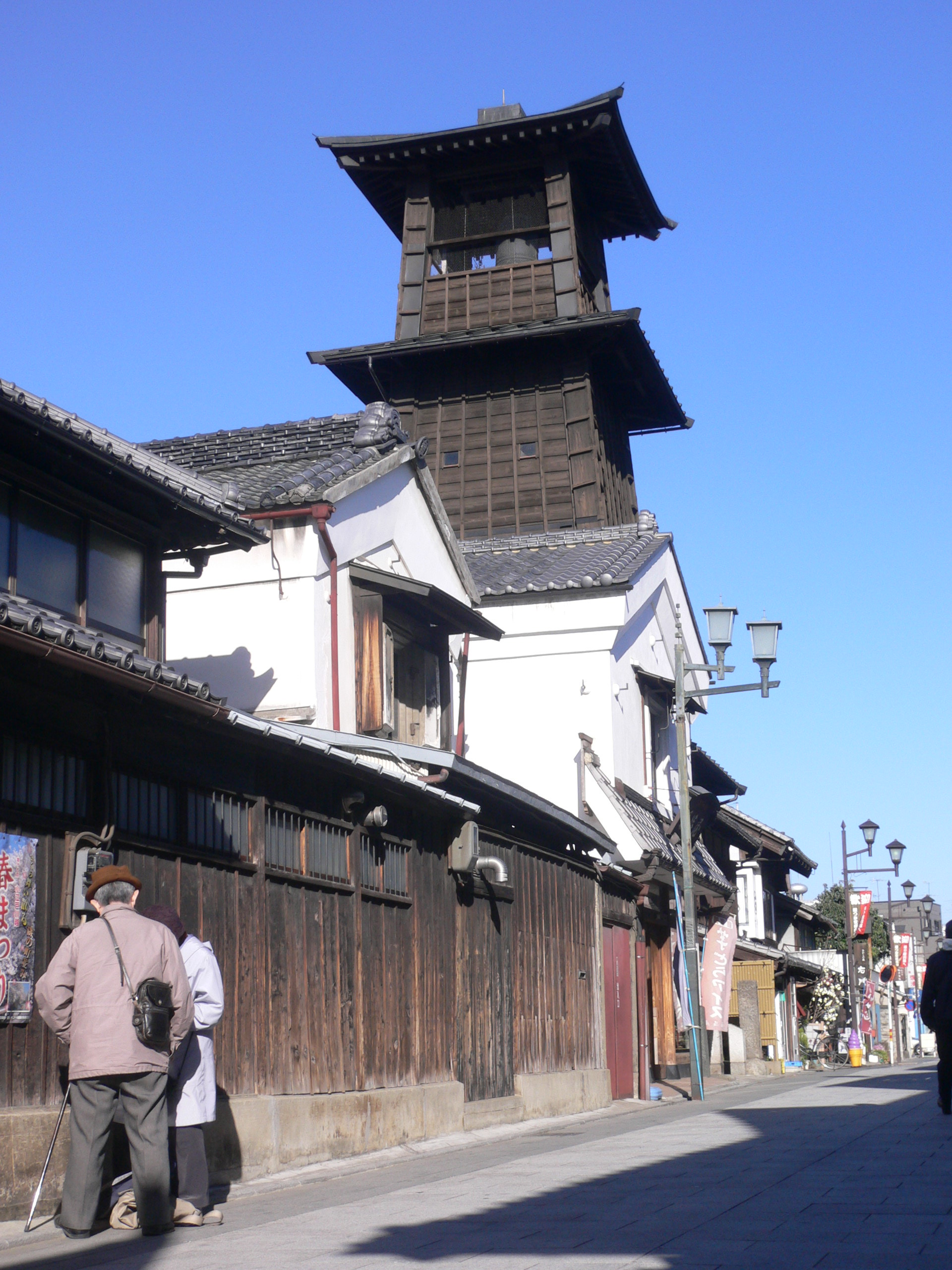

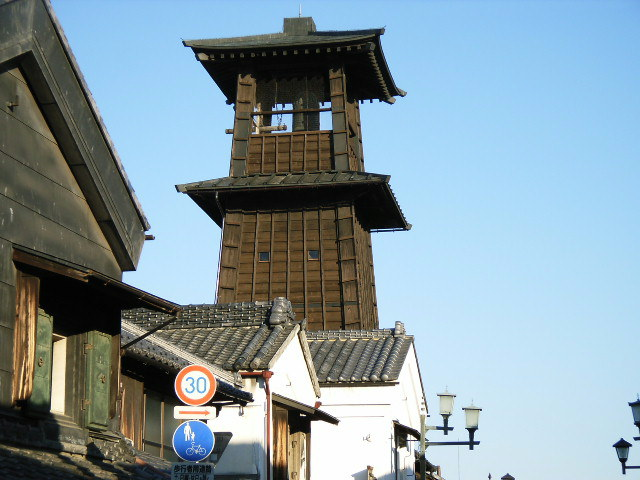

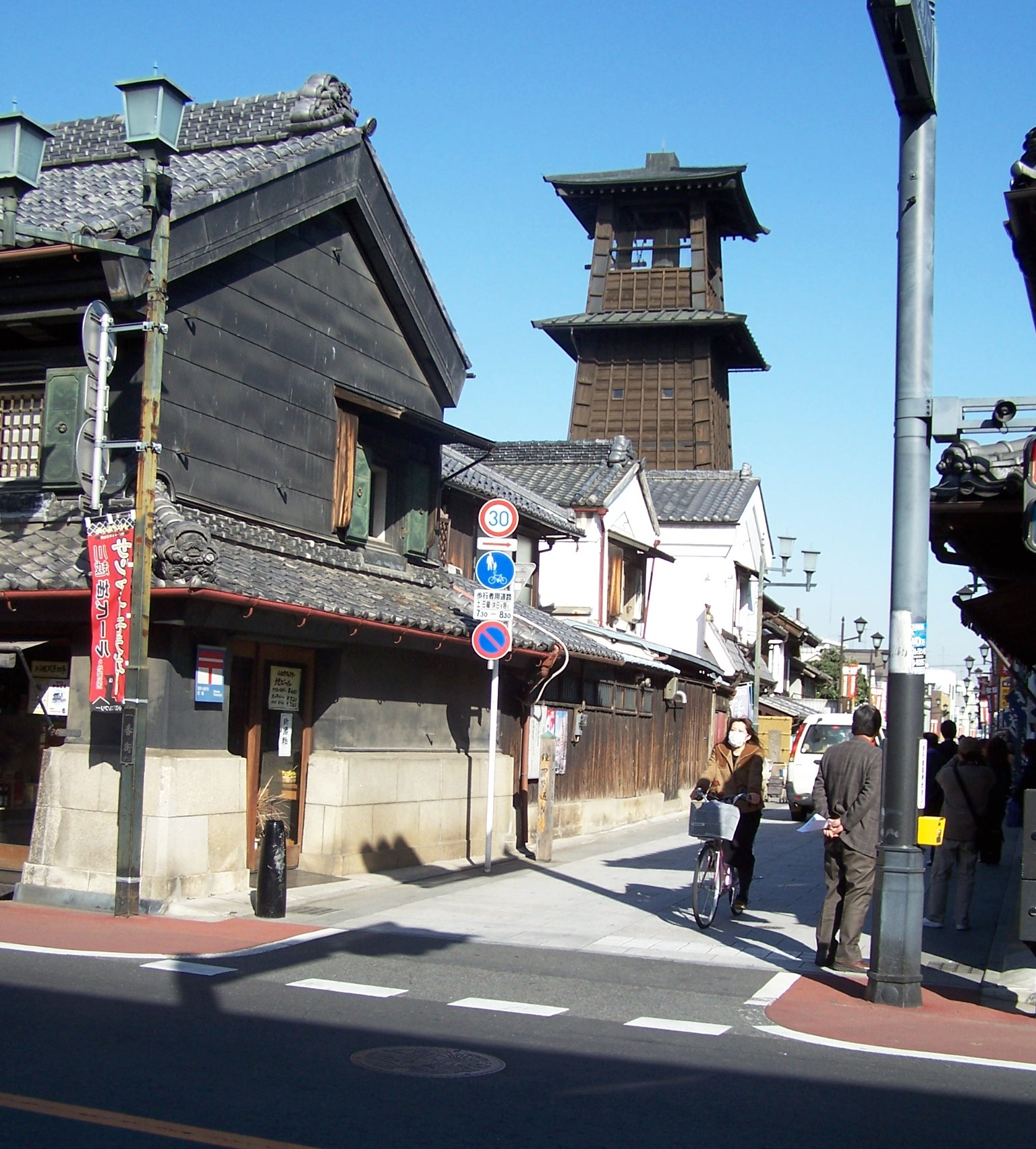
