= Riichi Takahira =

Japanese motorcycle racer (born 2009)

Riichi Takahira 髙平 理智
- Born: 14 January 2009 (age 17); Sakura, Chiba, Japan
- Nationality: Japanese
- Current team: Tianyu Asia Racing
- Bike number: 18 / 44

Championship titles
- FIM Yamaha R3 Blu Cru World Cup (2026)
Statistics
Yamaha R3 Blu Cru World Cup
Active years	2026
Championships	1
Manufacturer	Yamaha
Starts / Wins / Podiums / Poles / F. laps / Points; 12 / 3 / 5 / 0 / 1 / 173
ARRC AP250
Active years	2025–
Championships	0
Manufacturer	Yamaha
Team(s)	Tianyu Asia Racing
Starts / Wins / Podiums / Poles / F. laps / Points; 16 / 0 / 1 / 1 / 2 / 123

Riichi "Reach" Takahira (Japanese: 髙平 理智, Hepburn: Takahira Riichi; born 14 January 2009), is a Japanese motorcycle racer who competes in the Yamaha R3 Blu Cru World Cup and Asia Road Racing Championship for Tianyu Asia Racing. He is the 2026 FIM Yamaha R3 Blu Cru World Cup champion.

Takahira is an Asia Talent Cup graduate, having competed there in 2023 and 2024. He has additionally competed in the All Japan Road Race Championship, in the JP250 and J-GP3 classes.

== Career ==
=== Early career ===
Born in Chiba, Japan, Takahira began riding pocketbikes aged six, after competing in and winning balance bike championships. By the age of ten he had won the Runbike World Championship and Chiba Pocketbike Championship, and began competing in the 74Daijiro class of the Daijiro Cup. At 11, he joined the Suzuka Racing School and participated in the 250cc class, and later won the Suzuka Sunday Road Race Championship in the J-GP3 class in 2022. In 2023, Takahira entered three races of the All Japan Road Race Championship in the J-GP3 class with Team Taro, and managed a sixth-place finish at Tsukuba.

=== Asia Talent Cup (2023–2024) ===
Following his domestic junior career, Takahira was selected to compete in the Asia Talent Cup for the 2023 season, aged 14. He won his first race during the opening round at Sepang, beating Veda Pratama to the line, and finished in second place in Race 2. He would remain near the podium spots throughout the season and finished sixth overall in his rookie year. Takahira returned to the Cup for a second season in 2024, when he clinched seven podiums in total, with two of them being second places at Lusail and Buriram. He finished his second season third overall, behind Zen Mitani and Ryota Ogiwara.

=== All Japan and Asia Road Racing Championship (2025–2026) ===
After two years in the Asia Talent Cup, Takahira was let go and returned to Japan in 2025, where he competed in the JP250 class of the All Japan Road Race Championship with Dog Fight Racing. In the opening round at Sugo, Takahira clinched his maiden win in the rain, and would score another podium in the third round at Motegi. During the qualifying session of the Autopolis round, Takahira suffered an injury that forced him to miss the remainder of the season, and ranked fourth in the National class.

In 2025, Takahira also competed in the AP250 class of the Asia Road Racing Championship, with Tianyu Asia Racing, with his best overall result being fourth at Sepang and Mandalika. He returned with the same team for 2026 and clinched his maiden podium at Mandalika.

=== Yamaha R3 Blu Cru World Cup (2026) ===
In 2026, Takahira was selected to compete in the FIM Yamaha R3 Blu Cru World Cup, with backing from Tianyu Asia Racing. He started the season with consistent top-ten finishes, and clinched his first podium at Aragon. During the fourth round at Magny-Cours, Takahira clinched his maiden win in a weekend double, which moved him up the standings into second. In the following round at Cremona, he would finish on the podium in both races, and clinched his third victory of the season—becoming the championship leader for the first time. Takahira was crowned the 2026 FIM Yamaha R3 Blu Cru World Cup champion in the final round at Estoril following fourth- and seventh-place finishes, beating rivals Mendez and Bocanegra.

== Career statistics ==
=== Tsukuba Road Race Championship ===
==== Races by year ====
(key) (Races in bold indicate pole position; races in italics indicate fastest lap)

Year	Class	Bike	1	2	3	4	Pos	Pts
2021	CBR250R	Honda	TSU1	**TSU2**; 3	TSU3; 2	TSU4; 2	3rd	56

=== Suzuka Sunday Road Race ===
==== Races by year ====
(key) (Races in bold indicate pole position; races in italics indicate fastest lap. Superscript numbers indicate overall results, including both national and international classes.)

Year	Class	Bike	1	2	3	4	5	Pos	Pts
2022	J-GP3 (Note: National class.)	Honda	SUZ1; 4^{8}	**SUZ2**; 2^{5}	SUZ3; 1^{1}	SUZ4; 4^{6}	SUZ5; 3^{4}	1st	90

=== All Japan Road Race Championship ===
==== Races by year ====
(key) (Races in bold indicate pole position; races in italics indicate fastest lap. Superscript numbers indicate overall results, including both national and international classes.)

Year	Class	Bike	1	2	3	4	5	6	Pos	Pts
2023	J-GP3	Honda	MOT; 21	SUG; 12	TSU; 6	AUT	OKA	SUZ	15th	14
2025	JP250 (Note: International class.)	Yamaha	SUG; 1^{1}	TSU; 6^{7}	MOT; 3^{6}	AUT; DNS	OKA	SUZ	4th	51

=== Asia Talent Cup ===
==== Races by year ====
(key) (Races in bold indicate pole position, races in italics indicate fastest lap)

Year	Bike	1		2		3		4		5		6		Pos	Pts
Year	Bike	R1	R2	R1	R2	R1	R2	R1	R2	R1	R2	R1	R2	Pos	Pts
2023	Honda	SEP; 1	SEP; 2	MOT; 6	MOT; Ret	MAN; 9	MAN; 8	BUR; 6	BUR; 5	**SEP**; Ret	**SEP**; 4	LUS; 5	LUS; 4	6th	128
2024	Honda	LUS; 2	LUS; 3	SEP; 3	SEP; 4	MAN; 7	MAN; 3	MOT; 5	MOT; 4	BUR; 2	BUR; 5	SEP; 3	SEP; 3	3rd	177

=== Asia Road Racing Championship ===
==== Races by year ====
(key) (Races in bold indicate pole position; races in italics indicate fastest lap)

Year	Class	Bike	1		2		3		4		5		6		Pos	Pts
Year	Class	Bike	R1	R2	R1	R2	R1	R2	R1	R2	R1	R2	R1	R2	Pos	Pts
2024	TVS	TVS	BUR; 7	BUR; Ret	ZHU; 3	ZHU; C	MOT; Ret	MOT; 4	**MAN**; 5	**MAN**; 4	SEP; DNS	SEP; DNS	BUR	BUR	10th	62
2025	AP250	Yamaha	BUR; Ret	BUR; 27	**SEP**; 4	**SEP**; 4	MOT; 6	MOT; 5	MAN; Ret	MAN; 4	SEP	SEP	BUR	BUR	11th	60
2026	AP250	Yamaha	SEP; Ret	SEP; 6	BUR; 8	BUR; 9	MOT; 11	MOT; 4	MAN; 16	MAN; 2	SEP	SEP	BUR	BUR	10th*	63*

* Season still in progress.

=== FIM Yamaha R3 Blu Cru World Cup ===
==== Races by year ====
(key) (Races in bold indicate pole position; races in italics indicate fastest lap)

Year	Bike	1		2		3		4		5		6		Pos	Pts
Year	Bike	R1	R2	R1	R2	R1	R2	R1	R2	R1	R2	R1	R2	Pos	Pts
2026	Yamaha	BAL; 7	BAL; 7	ARA; 4	ARA; 2	DON; 7	DON; Ret	MAG; 1	MAG; 1	CRE; 3	CRE; 1	EST; 4	EST; 7	1st	173
