= List of Grand Prix motorcycle racers: Y =

- (Japan) Kasuya Yamada
- (Japan) Tatsuya Yamaguchi
- (Japan) Yousuke Yamakawa
- (Japan) Takayoshi Yamamoto
- (Japan) Takehiro Yamamoto
- (Japan) Youichi Yamamoto
- (Japan) Gosuke Yamashita
- (Japan) Isao Yamashita
- (Japan) Kazuaki Yamashita
- (Japan) Fuyuki Yamazaki
- (Japan) Shunji Yatsushiro
- (Japan) Ryuji Yokoe
- (Japan) Toshimi Yorino
- (Japan) Kenichi Yoshida
- (Japan) Wataru Yoshikawa
- (United Kingdom) Lewis Young
- (Australia) Paul Young
- (Japan) Yasuharu Yuzawa
- (Malaysia) Shahrol Yuzy
