= Ramdan Rosli =

Malaysian motorcycle racer

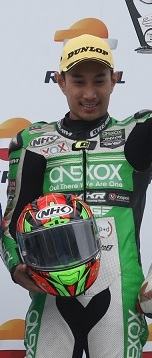
- Ramdan in 2019
- Nationality: Malaysian
- Born: 24 January 1996 (age 30)
- Current team: Team Hong Leong Yamaha Malaysia
- Bike number: 32
Motorcycle racing career statistics
Moto2 World Championship
Active years	2015–2016
Manufacturers	Kalex
2016 championship position	29th (4 pts)
Starts / Wins / Podiums / Poles / F. laps / Points; 5 / 0 / 0 / 0 / 0 / 4
Moto3 World Championship
Active years	2014
Manufacturers	KTM
2014 championship position	NC (0 pts)
Starts / Wins / Podiums / Poles / F. laps / Points; 1 / 0 / 0 / 0 / 0 / 0

Mohd Ramdan bin Mohd Rosli (born 24 January 1996) is a Malaysian professional motorcycle racer. He races in the Asia Road Race SS600 Championship, aboard a Yamaha YZF-R6. He has previously competed in the FIM CEV Moto3 Junior World Championship, the FIM CEV Moto2 European Championship and the Malaysian Cub Prix where he was the 2010 CP115 Class Champion.

== Career statistics ==
=== FIM CEV Moto3 Junior World Championship ===
==== Races by year ====
(key) (Races in bold indicate pole position; races in italics indicate fastest lap)

Year	Bike	1	2	3	4	5	6	7	8	9	10	11	Pos	Pts
2014	KTM	JER1; 24	JER2; 28	LMS; 15	ARA; 18	CAT1; 14	CAT2; 19	ALB; 14	NAV; 9	ALG; 17	VAL1; 15	VAL2; 13	21st	16

=== FIM CEV Moto2 European Championship ===
==== Races by year ====
(key) (Races in bold indicate pole position; races in italics indicate fastest lap)

Year	Bike	1	2	3	4	5	6	7	8	9	10	11	Pos	Pts
2015	Kalex	ALG1; 16	ALG2; 22	CAT; Ret	ARA1; 9	ARA2; Ret	ALB; 9	NAV1; 12	NAV2; 15	JER; 13	VAL1; 7	VAL2; Ret	12th	31
2016	Kalex	VAL1; Ret	VAL2; 11	ARA1; 13	ARA2; 17	CAT1; DNS	CAT2; DNS	ALB; 9	ALG1; 9	ALG2; 9	JER; 9	VAL; 10	14th	42
2019	Kalex	EST1; 3	EST2; 7	VAL; 9	CAT1; 20	CAT2; 11	ARA1; 5	ARA2; 11	JER; 7	ALB1; 10	ALB2; DNS	VAL	8th	68

=== Grand Prix motorcycle racing ===
==== By season ====
Season	Class	Motorcycle	Team	Race	Win	Podium	Pole	FLap	Pts	Plcd
2014	Moto3	KTM	Petronas AHM Malaysia	1	0	0	0	0	0	NC
2015	Moto2	Kalex	Petronas AHM Malaysia	2	0	0	0	0	0	NC
2016	Moto2	Kalex	Petronas AHM Malaysia	3	0	0	0	0	4	29th
Total				**6**	**0**	**0**	**0**	**0**	**4**	

=== Races by year ===
Year	Class	Bike	1	2	3	4	5	6	7	8	9	10	11	12	13	14	15	16	17	18	Pos	Points
2014	Moto3	KTM	QAT	AME	ARG	SPA	FRA	ITA	CAT	NED	GER	INP	CZE	GBR	RSM	ARA	JPN	AUS	MAL; Ret	VAL	NC	0
2015	Moto2	Kalex	QAT	AME	ARG	SPA	FRA	ITA	CAT; 26	NED	GER	INP	CZE	GBR	RSM	ARA	JPN	AUS	MAL; 24	VAL	NC	0
2016	Moto2	Kalex	QAT	ARG	AME	SPA	FRA	ITA	CAT; 19	NED	GER	AUT	CZE	GBR	RSM	ARA	JPN	AUS; 18	MAL; 12	VAL	29th	4

=== ARRC Supersports 600 ===
==== Races by year ====
(key) (Races in bold indicate pole position; races in italics indicate fastest lap)

Year	Bike	1		2		3		4		5		Pos	Pts
Year	Bike	R1	R2	R1	R2	R1	R2	R1	R2	R1	R2	Pos	Pts
2022	Yamaha	CHA	CHA	SEP	SEP	SUG; Ret	SUG; 13	SEP; Ret	SEP; 11	CHA; Ret	CHA; 14	21st	10

=== TVS Asia One Make Championship ===
==== Races by year ====
(key) (Races in bold indicate pole position; races in italics indicate fastest lap)

Year	Bike	1		2		3		4		5		6		Pos	Pts
Year	Bike	R1	R2	R1	R2	R1	R2	R1	R2	R1	R2	R1	R2	Pos	Pts
2023	TVS Apache RR310	CHA; Ret	CHA; Ret	**SEP**; 2	**SEP**; 1	SUG; 3	SUG; 1	MAN; 3	MAN; 3	ZHU; Ret	ZHU; 3	CHA; 5	CHA; 4	4th	158
2024	TVS Apache RR310	CHA; 2	CHA; 5	ZHU; 2	ZHU; C	MOT; 3	MOT; 3	MAN; 2	MAN; 1	**SEP**; 3	**SEP**; Ret	**CHA**; 4	**CHA**; 4	2nd	170
2025	TVS Apache RR310	CHA; 2	CHA; 5	**SEP**; 1	**SEP**; 2	MOT; 3	MOT; 3	MAN; 4	MAN; 1	SEP; 2	SEP; 4	CHA; 1	CHA; 2	2nd	224
2026	TVS Apache RR310	SEP; 2	SEP; 1	**CHA**; 2	**CHA**; 2	MOT; 3	MOT; 8	MAN; 5	MAN; 4	MIS; 5	MIS; 4	CHA	CHA	1st*	157*
