= 2024 Asia Talent Cup =

Motorcycle road racing season

2024 Asia Talent Cup
Previous:	2023	Next:	2025

The 2024 Idemitsu Asia Talent Cup was the tenth running of the Asia Talent Cup, a motorcycle racing series organized by Dorna and sponsored by Idemitsu which is intended for young riders throughout Asia and Oceania. The season featured six rounds at circuits in Asia, with all but the second round being held as support races for the MotoGP World Championship. The season commenced at Lusail on 8 March, and concluded at Sepang on 3 November.

Japanese rider Zen Mitani dominated the championship, winning seven and finishing on the podium in ten of the season's twelve races to claim the championship title at the penultimate round in Buriram. Mitani's compatriots Ryota Ogiwara and Riichi Takahira finished second and third in the points, with fourth-placed Kiandra Ramadhipa's two victories making him the only non-Japanese rider to win a race.

== Entry list ==
The entry list of selected riders was released on 4 December 2023. All riders competed on identical 250cc Honda NSF250R motorcycles.

No.	Rider	Rounds
2	(Japan) Zen Mitani	All
3	(Malaysia) Asyraff Zaquan	2–6
5	(Thailand) Tanachat Pratumtong	2–6
6	(Australia) Levi Russo	All
7	(Indonesia) Kiandra Ramadhipa	All
8	(India) Rakshith Srihari	All
9	(Japan) Riichi Takahira	All
10	(Thailand) Burapa Wanmoon	1–2
11	(India) Sarthak Chavan	1–3, 5–6
12	(Australia) Rikki Henry	All
13	(Indonesia) Rama Putra Septiawan	1–2
14	(Japan) Seiryu Ikegami	All
15	(Australia) Archie Schmidt	All
16	(Japan) Ryota Ogiwara	All
17	(Malaysia) Farhan Naqib	All
18	(India) Chiranth Vishwanath	1–3, 5
19	(Malaysia) Farish Sezli	All
20	(Thailand) Kiattisak Singhapong	All
21	(Japan) Rintarō Takemoto	All
22	(Philippines) Alfonsi Daquigan	All
23	(Thailand) Kitsada Tanachot	1, 3–6
23	(China) Zhang Xuhao	2
24	(Indonesia) Davino Britani	3
25	(Japan) Shingo Iidaka	4
26	(Thailand) Noprutpong Bunprawes	5–6
27	(Thailand) Pancharuch Chitwirulchat	5

- Hsieh Shao-en of Chinese Taipei was scheduled to compete in the championship, but withdrew prior to the start of the season.

== Calendar and results ==
The provisional season calendar was announced on 30 November 2023, with all six rounds held in support of the host nation's respective MotoGP World Championship Grand Prix. Following the postponement and eventual cancellation of the Grand Prix of India, the second round, which was originally scheduled to be held at the Buddh International Circuit in Greater Noida, was rescheduled to take place alongside the Malaysian Superbike Championship at Sepang.

Rnd.		Circuit	Date	Pole position	Fastest lap	Winning rider
1	1	(Qatar) Lusail International Circuit, Lusail	9 March	(Japan) Zen Mitani	(Japan) Zen Mitani	(Japan) Zen Mitani
1	2	(Qatar) Lusail International Circuit, Lusail	10 March	(Japan) Zen Mitani	(Malaysia) Farish Hafiy	(Indonesia) Kiandra Ramadhipa
2	3	(Malaysia) Sepang International Circuit, Sepang	17 August	(Japan) Zen Mitani	(Japan) Zen Mitani	(Japan) Zen Mitani
2	4	(Malaysia) Sepang International Circuit, Sepang	18 August	(Japan) Zen Mitani	(Thailand) Kiattisak Singhapong	(Japan) Zen Mitani
3	5	(Indonesia) Mandalika International Street Circuit, Central Lombok Regency	28 September	(Japan) Ryota Ogiwara	(Japan) Seiryu Ikegami	(Japan) Zen Mitani
3	6	(Indonesia) Mandalika International Street Circuit, Central Lombok Regency	29 September	(Japan) Ryota Ogiwara	(Malaysia) Farish Hafiy	(Japan) Ryota Ogiwara
4	7	(Japan) Mobility Resort Motegi, Motegi	5 October	(Japan) Zen Mitani	(Japan) Zen Mitani	(Japan) Zen Mitani
4	8	(Japan) Mobility Resort Motegi, Motegi	6 October	(Japan) Zen Mitani	(Japan) Ryota Ogiwara	(Japan) Seiryu Ikegami
5	9	(Thailand) Chang International Circuit, Buriram	26 October	(Japan) Ryota Ogiwara	(Thailand) Kiattisak Singhapong	(Indonesia) Kiandra Ramadhipa
5	10	(Thailand) Chang International Circuit, Buriram	27 October	(Japan) Ryota Ogiwara	(Australia) Archie Schmidt	(Japan) Ryota Ogiwara
6	11	(Malaysia) Sepang International Circuit, Sepang	2 November	(Japan) Zen Mitani	(Japan) Riichi Takahira	(Japan) Zen Mitani
6	12	(Malaysia) Sepang International Circuit, Sepang	3 November	(Japan) Zen Mitani	(Japan) Zen Mitani	(Japan) Zen Mitani

== Championship standings ==
Scoring system
Points are awarded to the top fifteen finishers. A rider has to finish the race to earn points.

Position	1st	2nd	3rd	4th	5th	6th	7th	8th	9th	10th	11th	12th	13th	14th	15th
Points	25	20	16	13	11	10	9	8	7	6	5	4	3	2	1

Pos.	Rider	QAT (Qatar)		MAL1 (Malaysia)		INA (Indonesia)		JPN (Japan)		THA (Thailand)		MAL2 (Malaysia)		Pts
Pos.	Rider	R1	R2	R1	R2	R1	R2	R1	R2	R1	R2	R1	R2	Pts
1	(Japan) Zen Mitani	1	2	1	1	1	2	1	2	5	4	1	1	259
2	(Japan) Ryota Ogiwara	Ret	16	2	5	4	1	2	3	3	1	4	2	179
3	(Japan) Riichi Takahira	2	3	3	4	7	3	5	4	2	5	3	3	177
4	(Indonesia) Kiandra Ramadhipa	4	1	4	2	6	17	4	14	1	6	5	Ret	142
5	(Japan) Seiryu Ikegami	3	17	Ret	6	2	4	3	1	9	14	2	5	140
6	(Thailand) Kiattisak Singhapong	5	4	5	7	5	5	9	7	4	3	8	6	129
7	(Malaysia) Farish Hafiy	6	Ret	7	3	3	6	Ret	6	6	18	Ret	4	94
8	(Japan) Rintarō Takemoto	7	Ret	6	8	8	9	6	8	11	9	9	10	85
9	(Philippines) Alfonsi Daquigan	10	9	9	11	9	Ret	NC	11	7	10	6	7	71
10	(Australia) Archie Schmidt	11	10	13	14	14	11	10	10	10	2	7	Ret	70
11	(Australia) Levi Kwan Russo	8	7	10	12	10	8	8	9	15	Ret	11	8	70
12	(India) Sarthak Chavan	9	6	8	13	11	7			13	8	14	11	60
13	(Australia) Rikki Henry	12	5	17	18	15	12	NC	17	8	13	10	Ret	37
14	(Thailand) Tanachat Pratumtong			Ret	9	13	10	11	13	DNS	11	12	12	37
15	(Thailand) Kitsada Tanachot	13	12			12	13	12	12	12	15	15	16	28
16	(Japan) Shingo Iidaka							7	5					20
17	(Malaysia) Asyraff Zaquan			16	16	17	14	14	15	18	12	13	9	19
18	(Indonesia) Rama Putra Septiawan	14	8	11	17									15
19	(Thailand) Noprutpong Bunprawes									14	7	17	13	14
20	(Thailand) Burapa Wanmoon	15	11	Ret	10									12
21	(Malaysia) Farhan Naqib	Ret	14	15	15	18	15	13	16	17	DNS	16	14	10
22	(India) Rakshith Dave	17	15	12	Ret	19	Ret	15	18	19	17	18	15	7
23	(India) Chiranth Vishwanath	16	13	14	19	16	16			20	Ret			5
—	(Thailand) Pancharuch Chitwirulchat									16	16			0
—	(China) Zhang Xuhao			18	20									0
—	(Indonesia) Davino Britani					20	Ret							0
Pos.	Rider	R1	R2	R1	R2	R1	R2	R1	R2	R1	R2	R1	R2	Pts
Pos.	Rider	QAT (Qatar)		MAL1 (Malaysia)		INA (Indonesia)		JPN (Japan)		THA (Thailand)		MAL2 (Malaysia)		Pts
