= Kasma Daniel =

Malaysian motorcycle racer

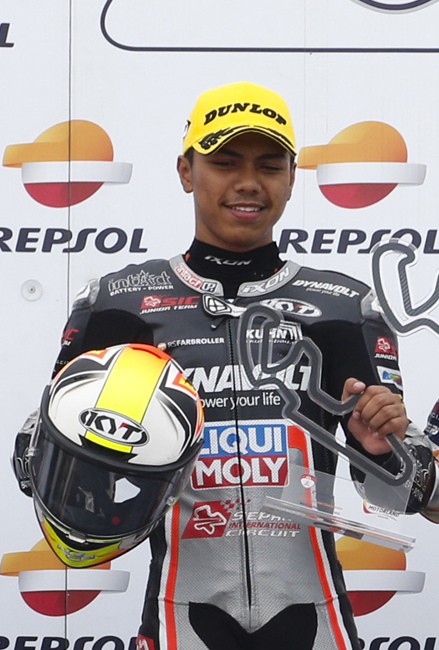
- Kasma Daniel in 2019
- Nationality: Malaysian
- Born: 2 September 2000 (age 26); Johor Bahru, Malaysia
- Current team: Yamaha Team Asean
- Bike number: 27
Motorcycle racing career statistics
Moto2 World Championship
Active years	2020, 2022-2023
Manufacturers	Kalex
Championships	0
2022 championship position	38th (0 pts)
Starts / Wins / Podiums / Poles / F. laps / Points; 18 / 0 / 0 / 0 / 0 / 0
Moto3 World Championship
Active years	2017
Manufacturers	Honda
Championships	0
2017 championship position	NC (0 pts)
Starts / Wins / Podiums / Poles / F. laps / Points; 1 / 0 / 0 / 0 / 0 / 0

Championship titles
- Malaysian Cub Prix CP115 (2015); Malaysia Superbike Championship (MSBK) (2026)

Kasma Daniel bin Kasmayudin (born 2 September 2000), is a Malaysian motorcycle racer. He is currently competing in the ARRC Supersport 600 category. He was the 2015 Malaysian Cub Prix Champion in the CP115 class.

== Career ==
Kasma Daniel made his debut in the 2017 Moto3 season, as a wildcard in the 2017 Malaysian GP. He was also racing in FIM CEV Repsol in the same season.

During the 2019 season, Kasma Daniel raced in FIM CEV Repsol Moto2 for SIC Intact GP team partnering Matthias Meggle. On the same year, he also attended the VR46 Rider Academy Master Camp Training with Valentino Rossi in Italy.

=== Supersport Asia ===
Winner of 4 Series Cub Prix, Kasma Daniel dropped wildcard Supersport ARRC Sentul as this year's debut back in Asian racing. After stopping AP250 racing at ARRC 2016, Kasma went to compete in the FIM CEV Moto3 Junior World Championship.

=== Moto2 World Championship ===
Kasma Daniel was promoted to the FIM Moto2 World Championship with Onexox TKKR SAG Team in 2020 following a strong campaign in FIM CEV Repsol Moto2 the year prior. He was given a year-old spec Kalex machinery as his team struggled with financial issues. He finished the season with no points and registered the most crashes out of all world championship riders.

Despite having a contract with SAG Team for 2021 following its rebranding to Pertamina Mandalika SAG Racing Team, Kasma Daniel's contract was terminated after the team opted to sign Bo Bendsneyder.

=== Asia Superbike 1000cc ===
After quitting Moto2, Kasma Daniel appeared in the 2022 Asia Road Racing Championship (ARRC). He competed in the Asia Superbike 1000cc (ASBK1000) class with the Yamaha Asean Team, riding a Yamaha YZF-R1M.

== Career statistics ==
=== FIM CEV Moto3 Junior World Championship ===
==== Races by year ====
(key) (Races in bold indicate pole position, races in italics indicate fastest lap)

Year	Bike	1	2	3	4	5	6	7	8	9	10	11	12	Pos	Pts
2017	Honda	ALB; 21	LMS; Ret	CAT1; Ret	CAT2; 17	VAL1; Ret	VAL2; Ret	EST; 10	JER1; 17	JER1; Ret	ARA; Ret	VAL1	VAL2	31st	6

=== FIM CEV Moto2 Championship European ===
==== By year ====
(key) (Races in bold indicate pole position, races in italics indicate fastest lap)

Year	Bike	1	2	3	4	5	6	7	8	9	10	11	Pos	Pts
2019	Kalex	EST1; Ret	EST2; 9	VAL; 7	CAT1; 14	CAT2; 17	ARA1; 2	ARA2; Ret	JER; Ret	ALB1; 8	ALB2; Ret	VAL; 8	10th	54

=== Grand Prix motorcycle racing ===
==== By season ====
Season	Class	Motorcycle	Team	Race	Win	Podium	Pole	FLap	Pts	Plcd
2017	Moto3	Honda	Sepang Racing Team	1	0	0	0	0	0	NC
2020	Moto2	Kalex	Onexox TKKR SAG Team	15	0	0	0	0	0	31st
2022	Moto2	Kalex	Petronas MIE Racing RW	1	0	0	0	0	0	38th
2023	Moto2	Kalex	Correos Prepago Yamaha VR46 Master Camp	2	0	0	0	0	0*	40th*
Total				**19**	**0**	**0**	**0**	**0**	**0**	

==== By class ====
Class	Seasons	1st GP	1st Pod	1st Win	Race	Win	Podiums	Pole	FLap	Pts	WChmp
Moto3	2017	2017 Malaysia			1	0	0	0	0	0	0
Moto2	2020, 2022-2023	2020 Qatar			18	0	0	0	0	0	0
Total	2017, 2020, 2022-2023				**19**	**0**	**0**	**0**	**0**	**0**	**0**

==== Races by year ====
(key) (Races in bold indicate pole position; races in italics indicate fastest lap)

Year	Class	Bike	1	2	3	4	5	6	7	8	9	10	11	12	13	14	15	16	17	18	19	20	Pos	Pts
2017	Moto3	Honda	QAT	ARG	AME	SPA	FRA	ITA	CAT	NED	GER	CZE	AUT	GBR	RSM	ARA	JPN	AUS	MAL; Ret	VAL			NC	0
2020	Moto2	Kalex	QAT; Ret	SPA; 22	ANC; Ret	CZE; Ret	AUT; 23	STY; 21	RSM; 20	EMI; Ret	CAT; 20	FRA; DSQ	ARA; 25	TER; Ret	EUR; 21	VAL; 20	POR; Ret						31st	0
2022	Moto2	Kalex	QAT	INA	ARG	AME	POR	SPA	FRA	ITA	CAT	GER	NED	GBR	AUT	RSM	ARA	JPN	THA	AUS	MAL; 19	VAL	38th	0
2023	Moto2	Kalex	POR	ARG	AME	SPA	FRA	ITA; 22	GER; 22	NED	GBR	AUT	CAT	RSM	IND	JPN	INA	AUS	THA	MAL	QAT	VAL	40th*	0*

=== Asia Superbike 1000 ===
==== Races by year ====
(key) (Races in bold indicate pole position; races in italics indicate fastest lap)

Year	Bike	1		2		3		4		5		6		Pos	Pts
Year	Bike	R1	R2	R1	R2	R1	R2	R1	R2	R1	R2	R1	R2	Pos	Pts
2022	Yamaha	CHA; 6	CHA; Ret	**SEP**; 1	**SEP**; 4	**SUG**; 3	**SUG**; 2	SEP; 5	SEP; 2	**CHA**; 1	**CHA**; 4			3rd	153
2023	Yamaha	CHA; 8	CHA; 7	SEP; 6	SEP; 7	SUG; 1	SUG; Ret	MAN; 6	MAN; C	ZHU; 8	ZHU; 7	CHA; 7	CHA; 7	5th	106
2024	Yamaha	CHA; 9	CHA; 10	ZHU; 10	ZHU; C	MOT; 9	MOT; 9	MAN; 9	MAN; 7	SEP; 7	SEP; 7	CHA; 7	CHA; 7	8th	85

=== ARRC Supersport 600 ===
==== Races by year ====
(key) (Races in bold indicate pole position; races in italics indicate fastest lap)

Year	Bike	1		2		3		4		5		6		Pos	Pts
Year	Bike	R1	R2	R1	R2	R1	R2	R1	R2	R1	R2	R1	R2	Pos	Pts
2025	Yamaha	CHA; Ret	CHA; 1	**SEP**; 2	**SEP**; 13	**MOT**; 2	**MOT**; 5	MAN; 7	MAN; 3	**SEP**; 2	**SEP**; 2	CHA; 6	CHA; 4	1st	167
2026	Yamaha	SEP; 7	SEP; 1	**CHA**; 1	**CHA**; 4	**MOT**; 2	**MOT**; 6	**MAN**; 2	**MAN**; 11	**SEP**; 6	**SEP**; 2	CHA	CHA	1st*	157*

== FIM Intercontinental Games results ==
Year	Venue	Class	Team	Bike	No	Rider	Race		Points	TC
Year	Venue	Class	Team	Bike	No	Rider	R1	R2	Points	TC
2024	City of Jerez	SS	FIM Asia	Yamaha YZF-R7	17	(Thailand) Apiwath Wongthananon	8	4	129	2nd
2024	City of Jerez	SS	FIM Asia	Yamaha YZF-R7	18	(Japan) Soichiro Minamimoto	9	8	129	2nd
2024	City of Jerez	SS	FIM Asia	Yamaha YZF-R7	19	(Malaysia) Kasma Daniel	6	6	129	2nd
2024	City of Jerez	SS	FIM Asia	Yamaha YZF-R7	20	(Japan) Naoko Takasugi	15	15	129	2nd
