= Kiandra Ramadhipa =

Indonesian motorcycle racer (born 2009)

- Nationality: Indonesian
- Born: 4 December 2009 (age 16); Sleman, Indonesia
- Current team: Honda Asia-Dream Racing Junior Team
- Bike number: 32

Muhammad Kiandra Ramadhipa (born 4 December 2009) is an Indonesian motorcycle racer who competes in the Moto3 Junior World Championship for Honda Asia-Dream Racing Junior Team, as well as in the Red Bull MotoGP Rookies Cup.

Kiandra is an Asia Talent Cup graduate, having raced in the cup in 2024.

== Career ==
=== Early career ===
Kiandra was born in Sleman, Indonesia. He began racing in regional Indonesian mini motocross championships around the age of five, before eventually switching to road racing in 2017. Kiandra won the Indonesian Regional MiniGP Championship in 2018, aged nine. In 2022, he clinched the Indonesian MotoPrix National Championship.

==== Asia Road Racing Championship ====
In 2022, Kiandra participated in the Underbone 150 class of the 2022 Asia Road Racing Championship, where he claimed a second-place finish at the Sepang round, as a wildcard. In 2023, he made another wildcard appearance in the Asia Production 250 class of the 2023 Asia Road Racing Championship, at Mandalika. Kiandra also competed in the 2024 Asia Road Racing Championship full-time, in the Asia Production 250 class. He won three races and finished third overall.

==== Asia Talent Cup ====
Kiandra competed in the Thailand Talent Cup championship in 2023, on board a Honda NSF250RW, where he claimed several podiums, including one win, and finished third in the final standings. As a result, he was given a wildcard participation in the 2023 Asia Talent Cup at the Indonesian round, where he finished 11th and 12th in Races 1 and 2. In November 2023, Kiandra was selected to compete in the 2024 Asia Talent Cup. He had a strong rookie season, claiming two victories at Qatar and Thailand, as well as a second-place finish at Malaysia. He finished the season in fourth place in the standings, which granted him a spot in the 2025 Red Bull MotoGP Rookies Cup, as well as the 2025 European Talent Cup.

==== European Talent Cup ====
Kiandra had a strong European Talent Cup debut, snatching a podium finish in the opening race at Estoril. He would claim his maiden win at the third round at Magny-Cours, and his second in the sixth round at Barcelona. He finished the season in fifth place overall, 31 points away from first.

==== Red Bull MotoGP Rookies Cup ====
Kiandra finished his debut 2025 Red Bull MotoGP Rookies Cup season in eighth place, including one podium at Sachsenring, and several top-ten finishes.

==== Moto3 Junior World Championship ====
Kiandra was promoted from the European Talent Cup to the FIM Moto3 Junior World Championship for the 2026 season, with the Honda Asia-Dream Racing Junior Team—after four podiums and two wins in his 2025 campaign.

== Career statistics ==
=== Asia Road Racing Championship ===
==== Races by year ====
(key) (Races in bold indicate pole position; races in italics indicate fastest lap)

Year	Class	Bike	1		2		3		4		5		6		Pos	Pts
Year	Class	Bike	R1	R2	R1	R2	R1	R2	R1	R2	R1	R2	R1	R2	Pos	Pts
2022	UB150	Honda	CHA	CHA	SEP; 9	SEP; 2	SUG	SUG	SEP; Ret	SEP; 10	CHA	CHA			15th	33
2023	AP250	Honda	CHA	CHA	SEP	SEP	SUG	SUG	MAN; 7	MAN; 5	ZHU	ZHU	CHA	CHA	18th	20
2024	AP250	Honda	CHA; 5	CHA; 6	ZHU; 6	ZHU; C	**MOT**; 1	**MOT**; 1	MAN; 6	MAN; 2	**SEP**; 5	SEP; DNS	CHA; 1	CHA; Ret	3rd	147

=== Asia Talent Cup ===
==== Races by year ====
(key) (Races in bold indicate pole position; races in italics indicate fastest lap)

Year	Bike	1		2		3		4		5		6		Pos	Pts
Year	Bike	R1	R2	R1	R2	R1	R2	R1	R2	R1	R2	R1	R2	Pos	Pts
2023	Honda	MAL	MAL	JPN	JPN	INA; 11	INA; 12	THA	THA	MAL	MAL	QAT	QAT	22nd	9
2024	Honda	QAT; 4	QAT; 1	MAL; 4	MAL; 2	INA; 6	INA; 17	JPN; 4	JPN; 14	THA; 1	THA; 6	MAL; 5	MAL; Ret	4th	142

=== European Talent Cup ===
==== Races by year ====
(key) (Races in bold indicate pole position; races in italics indicate fastest lap)

Year	Bike	1	2	3	4	5	6	7	8	9	10	11	Pos	Pts
2025	Honda	EST1; 3	EST2; Ret	JER1; 7	JER2; 6	MAG1; 1	MAG2; 4	ARA; 6	MIS1; 5	MIS2; 6	CAT; 1	VAL; Ret	5th	129

=== Red Bull MotoGP Rookies Cup ===
==== Races by year ====
(key) (Races in bold indicate pole position; races in italics indicate fastest lap)

Year	Bike	1		2		3		4		5		6		7		Pos	Pts
Year	Bike	R1	R2	R1	R2	R1	R2	R1	R2	R1	R2	R1	R2	R1	R2	Pos	Pts
2025	KTM	JER; 15	JER; 14	LMS; 12	LMS; Ret	ARA; 10	ARA; 9	MUG; 12	MUG; 8	SAC; 2	SAC; 4	RBR; 4	RBR; 12	MIS; 5	MIS; 7	8th	102
2026	KTM	JER; 7	JER; 1	LMS; 10	LMS; 6	MUG; 10	MUG; Ret	ASS; Ret	ASS; 7	SAC; 5	SAC; 1	MIS; Ret	MIS; 11	RBR; 16	RBR; Ret	9th	106

=== FIM Moto3 Junior World Championship ===
==== Races by year ====
(key) (Races in bold indicate pole position; races in italics indicate fastest lap)

Year	Bike	1	2	3	4	5	6	7	8	9	10	11	12	Pos	Pts
2026	Honda	CAT1; 3	CAT2; 6	EST; 1	JER1; 7	JER2; 21	MAG; 12	VAL1; 10	VAL2; 6	ARA1; 2	ARA2; 4	**MIS1**; 4	**MIS2**; 2	5th	146
