= 2026 Asia Road Racing Championship =

31st season Asia Road Racing Championship

2026 Asia Road Racing Championship
Previous:	2025	Next:	2027

The 2026 Idemitsu FIM Asia Road Racing Championship is the 31st season of the Asia Road Racing Championship. The season began on 11 April at Petronas Sepang International Circuit in Malaysia and will conclude on 6 December at Chang International Circuit in Thailand.

== Calendar ==
The provisional calendar was first announced on 21 January 2026

Round	Circuit	Date
1	(Malaysia) Petronas Sepang International Circuit, Sepang	10–12 April
2	(Thailand) Chang International Circuit, Buriram	8–10 May
3	(Japan) Mobility Resort Motegi, Motegi	12–14 June
4	(Indonesia) Pertamina Mandalika International Street Circuit, Mandalika	7–9 August
5	(Malaysia) Petronas Sepang International Circuit, Sepang	4–6 September
5	(Italy) Misano World Circuit, Misano Adriatico	2–4 October
6	(Thailand) Chang International Circuit, Buriram	4–6 December

== Teams and riders ==
=== ASB1000 Participants ===
2026 ASB1000 Entry List
Team	Constructor	Motorcycle	No.	Rider	Rounds
(Japan) Team Tatara Aprilia Asia	Aprilia	RSV4 1100	12	(Japan) Shogo Kawasaki	3
(Japan) Team Tatara Aprilia Asia	Aprilia	RSV4 1100	26	(Japan) Kazuki Watanabe	1–5
(Malaysia) Forty Forged Asia Racing Team	BMW	M1000RR	15	(Germany) Rocco Sessler	1–5
(Malaysia) Forty Forged Asia Racing Team	BMW	M1000RR	67	(Japan) Kaito Toba	5
(Malaysia) Forty Forged Asia Racing Team	BMW	M1000RR	85	(Malaysia) Fahmi Abdul Wahaf	1–5
(India) Racehub Racing Team	BMW	M1000RR	99	(India) Abhijith Satya Prasad	5
(Malaysia) Savitar Team Asia	BMW	M1000RR	16	(Malaysia) Teo Yew Joe	1
(Malaysia) Savitar Team Asia	BMW	M1000RR	62	(Malaysia) Chan Qing Rong	1–2, 4–5
(Australia) Swift Grow Racing Team	BMW	M1000RR	83	(Australia) Lachlan Epis	1–5
(Australia) Swift Grow Racing Team	BMW	M1000RR	220	(Australia) Declan Carberry	2
(Malaysia) JDT Racing Team	Ducati	Panigale V4 R	11	(Australia) Josh Waters	4–5
(Malaysia) JDT Racing Team	Ducati	Panigale V4 R	27	(Indonesia) Andi Farid Izdihar	1–3
(Malaysia) JDT Racing Team	Ducati	Panigale V4 R	55	(Malaysia) Hafizh Syahrin	1–5
(Japan) Astemo Pro Honda SI Racing	Honda	CBR1000RR–R Fireblade SP	54	(Japan) Kohta Arakawa	3
(Indonesia) Astra Honda Racing Team	Honda	CBR1000RR–R Fireblade SP	88	(Indonesia) Adenanta Putra	1–5
Honda Racing Thailand	Honda	CBR1000RR–R Fireblade SP	41	(Thailand) Nakarin Atiratphuvapat	1–5
Idemitsu Honda Racing Malaysia	Honda	CBR1000RR–R Fireblade SP	20	(Malaysia) Azroy Anuar	1–5
Idemitsu Honda Racing Malaysia	Honda	CBR1000RR–R Fireblade SP	21	(Malaysia) Zaqhwan Zaidi	1–5
SDG HARC–PRO. Honda Philippines	Honda	CBR1000RR–R Fireblade SP	39	(Japan) Keito Abe	1–5
(Malaysia) AMI Suzuki Motorsport	Suzuki	GSX-R1000R	77	(Malaysia) Adam Norrodin	1, 5
(Chinese Taipei) Mobilub Suzuki Racing Team	Suzuki	GSX-R1000R	24	(Chinese Taipei) Lee Po Yu	5
(Japan) Akeno Speed UMA Racing Yamaha Majumotor Asia Team	Yamaha	YZF-R1M	74	(Japan) Shota Ite	3
(Australia) MotoGo Yamaha Fusport Racing	Yamaha	YZF-R1M	13	(Australia) Anthony West	1, 4–5
(Australia) MotoGo Yamaha Fusport Racing	Yamaha	YZF-R1M	45	(Australia) Olly Simpson	2–3
(Malaysia) Victor Racing Team	Yamaha	YZF-R1M	40	(United Kingdom) Joe Francis	1–5

Key
Regular rider
Wildcard rider
Replacement rider

=== SS600 Participants ===
2026 SS600 Entry List
Team	Constructor	Motorcycle	No.	Rider	Rounds
(Indonesia) Astra Honda Racing Team	Honda	CBR600RR	46	(Indonesia) Herjun Firdaus	1–5
(Indonesia) Astra Honda Racing Team	Honda	CBR600RR	93	(Indonesia) Arbi Aditama	1–2
Honda Racing Thailand	Honda	CBR600RR	18	(Thailand) Kitsada Tanachot	1–4
Honda Racing Thailand	Honda	CBR600RR	31	(Thailand) Thanat Laoongplio	1–5
Idemitsu Honda Racing Malaysia	Honda	CBR600RR	32	(Malaysia) Helmi Azman	1–5
Idemitsu Honda Racing Malaysia	Honda	CBR600RR	98	(Malaysia) Khairul Idham Pawi	1–5
(Indonesia) MSGlowForMen Racing Team	Honda	CBR600RR	20	(Indonesia) Dimas Ekky Pratama	1–3, 5
(Indonesia) MSGlowForMen Racing Team	Honda	CBR600RR	306	(Indonesia) Felix Mulya	4
(Japan) Sanwa Racing Team	Honda	CBR600RR	78	(Japan) Hikari Okubo	3
(Malaysia) Hong Leong Yamaha Racing	Yamaha	YZF-R6	23	(Philippines) Mckinley Kyle Paz	1–5
(Malaysia) Hong Leong Yamaha Racing	Yamaha	YZF-R6	27	(Malaysia) Kasma Daniel	1–5
(Japan) Nitro Ryota Racing	Yamaha	YZF-R6	241	(Thailand) Apiwat Wongthananon	3
(Japan) Nitoro Ryota Racing41	Yamaha	YZF-R6	41	(Japan) Keisuke Tanaka	3
(Malaysia) Victor Racing Team	Yamaha	YZF-R6	24	(Malaysia) Izam Ikmal	1–5
(Malaysia) Victor Racing Team	Yamaha	YZF-R6	86	(China) Zhao Tianhao	1–5
Yamaha Racing Indonesia	Yamaha	YZF-R6	36	(Indonesia) Faerozi Toreqottullah	1–5
Yamaha Racing Indonesia	Yamaha	YZF-R6	38	(Indonesia) Arai Agaska	4
Yamaha Racing Indonesia	Yamaha	YZF-R6	89	(Indonesia) Wahyu Nugroho	1–5
Yamaha Thailand Racing Team	Yamaha	YZF-R6	500	(Thailand) Anupab Sarmoon	1–5

Key
Regular rider
Wildcard rider
Replacement rider

=== AP250 Participants ===
2026 AP250 Entry List
Team	Constructor	Motorcycle	No.	Rider	Rounds
(Indonesia) Astra Honda Racing Team	Honda	CBR250RR	16	(Indonesia) Irfan Ardiansyah	2–3
(Indonesia) Astra Honda Racing Team	Honda	CBR250RR	16	(Indonesia) Irfan Ardiansyah	4–5
(Indonesia) Astra Honda Racing Team	Honda	CBR250RR	45	(Indonesia) Badly Ayatullah	1, 4–5
(Indonesia) Astra Honda Racing Team	Honda	CBR250RR	123	(Indonesia) Rheza Danica Ahrens	1–5
Honda Racing Thailand	Honda	CBR250RR	12	(Thailand) Panjaruch Chitwirulchat	1–5
Honda Racing Vietnam	Honda	CBR250RR	76	(Japan) Hiroki Ono	2–4
Honda Racing Vietnam	Honda	CBR250RR	84	(Vietnam) Ngô Nguyễn Việt Tuấn	1, 5
(Malaysia) Motul Honda Asia Team	Honda	CBR250RR	18	(Vietnam) Nguyễn Hữu Trí	1–5
(Malaysia) Motul Honda Asia Team	Honda	CBR250RR	21	(Malaysia) Irfan Haykal	1–5
(Indonesia) MSGlowForMen Racing Team	Honda	CBR250RR	31	(Indonesia) Gerry Salim	1–5
(Thailand) NJT PTT Lubricants Racing Team	Honda	CBR250RR	321	(Thailand) Pacharagorn Thonggerdloung	2
(Japan) Sanwa Racing Team	Honda	CBR250RR	97	(Japan) Teppei Kugawa	3
SDG HARC–PRO. Honda Philippines	Honda	CBR250RR	25	(Philippines) Carlsen Jacob Solis	1–5
SDG HARC–PRO. Honda Philippines	Honda	CBR250RR	32	(Philippines) Jacob Sablaya	TBC
(India) Servo Hypersport Racing by Ten10	Honda	CBR250RR	41	(Japan) Raiku Hasegawa	2–5
(India) Servo Hypersport Racing by Ten10	Honda	CBR250RR	80	(India) Sethu Rajiv	1–3
(India) Servo Hypersport Racing by Ten10	Honda	CBR250RR	100	(Japan) Taiyo Saito	1, 4–5
(Japan) Team SDG With HARC–PRO	Honda	CBR250RR	37	(Japan) Aiki Iyoshi	1–5
(China) Pro Power Antares MT Kawasaki	Kawasaki	ZX-25R	40	(China) Shuncheng Zhang	1–4
(China) Pro Power Antares MT Kawasaki	Kawasaki	ZX-25R	55	(Spain) Unai Calatayud	1, 3–5
(China) Pro Power Antares MT Kawasaki	Kawasaki	ZX-25R	108	(Indonesia) Andy Muhammad Fadly	2, 5
(China) Pro Power Antares MT Kawasaki	Kawasaki	ZX-25R	108	(Indonesia) Andy Muhammad Fadly	4
(Japan) Akeno Speed Akitech UMA Yamaha Majumotor	Yamaha	YZF-R3	81	(Japan) Rintaro Takemoto	3
(Malaysia) Aeon Credit Zynergys JQK Cardinals Team	Yamaha	YZF-R3	50	(Malaysia) Ahmad Afif Amran	3–5
(Malaysia) Aeon Credit Zynergys JQK Cardinals Team	Yamaha	YZF-R3	91	(Japan) Shota Yokoyama	1–2
(Malaysia) Aeon Credit Zynergys JQK Cardinals Team	Yamaha	YZF-R3	98	(Japan) Hinata Okada	3
(Australia) Motogo Yamaha Fusport Racing	Yamaha	YZF-R3	74	(Australia) Hunter Corney	3
(Thailand) One For All	Yamaha	YZF-R3	11	(China) Gao Zi'ang	1–5
(Thailand) One For All	Yamaha	YZF-R3	24	(Thailand) Peerapong Luiboonpeng	1–5
(Indonesia) RPM Tab66 Sports SCK Asia Team	Yamaha	YZF-R3	43	(Indonesia) Reykat Yusuf Fadilah	5
(Singapore) Team ACR	Yamaha	YZF-R3	36	(Thailand) Teeranai Tubtim	4
(Singapore) Team ACR	Yamaha	YZF-R3	68	(Singapore) Jazil Juraimi	1–5
(India) Team RACR Castrol Power1	Yamaha	YZF-R3	111	(India) Kabilesh Rajini	1
(Japan) Team Tech2 & Sanwa Racing Team	Yamaha	YZF-R3	62	(Japan) Ryuji Yokoe	3
(China) Tian Yu Asia Racing MFZ	Yamaha	YZF-R3	22	(China) Sha Juntong	1, 5
(China) Tian Yu Asia Racing MFZ	Yamaha	YZF-R3	33	(Chinese Taipei) Liu Chun Mei	5
(China) Tian Yu Asia Racing MFZ	Yamaha	YZF-R3	44	(Japan) Riichi Takahira	1–4
(China) Tian Yu Asia Racing MFZ	Yamaha	YZF-R3	70	(Hong Kong) Zhong Wen Ze	4
(China) Tian Yu Asia Racing MFZ	Yamaha	YZF-R3	75	(China) Lu Yin	2–3
(Malaysia) UMA Racing Yamaha Maju Motor Asia Team	Yamaha	YZF-R3	13	(Chinese Taipei) Cheng Li Sheng	5
(Malaysia) UMA Racing Yamaha Maju Motor Asia Team	Yamaha	YZF-R3	57	(Malaysia) Danial Syahmi	1–5
(Malaysia) Victor Racing Team	Yamaha	YZF-R3	15	(Hong Kong) Leong Nang Tse	1, 5
(Malaysia) Victor Racing Team	Yamaha	YZF-R3	26	(Philippines) Christwil Villanueva	1
(Malaysia) Victor Racing Team	Yamaha	YZF-R3	77	(Malaysia) Idil Fitri Mahadi	2–5
(Malaysia) Victor Racing Team	Yamaha	YZF-R3	999	(China) Zhan Junhao	2
(Indonesia) Yamaha BAF Yamalube Akai Jaya	Yamaha	YZF-R3	69	(Indonesia) Aldiaz Ismaya	1–5
(Indonesia) Yamaha BAF Yamalube Akai Jaya	Yamaha	YZF-R3	99	(Indonesia) Galang Hendra Pratama	1–5
Yamaha LFN HP969 Indonesia Racing Team	Yamaha	YZF-R3	43	(Indonesia) Reykat Yusuf Fadilah	4
Yamaha LFN HP969 Indonesia Racing Team	Yamaha	YZF-R3	222	(Indonesia) Fahmi Basam	1–5
Yamaha Racing Indonesia	Yamaha	YZF-R3	88	(Indonesia) Candra Hermawan	1–5
Yamaha Racing Indonesia	Yamaha	YZF-R3	571	(Indonesia) Fadhil Musyavi	1–5
Yamaha Thailand Racing Team	Yamaha	YZF-R3	36	(Thailand) Teeranai Tubtim	1–2
Yamaha Thailand Racing Team	Yamaha	YZF-R3	39	(Thailand) Krittapat Keankum	1–5

Key
Regular rider
Wildcard rider
Replacement rider

=== UB150 Participants ===
2026 UB150 Entry List
Team	Constructor	Motorcycle	No.	Rider	Rounds
(Malaysia) Yuzy Asia Team	Honda	RSX150	51	(Malaysia) Ahmad Darwisy	1–5
(Malaysia) Yuzy Asia Team	Honda	RSX150	61	(Malaysia) Shahrol Syazras	1–5
(Indonesia) JPNW SND Factory Racing	Honda	Supra GTR 150	77	(Indonesia) Aditya Fauzi	1–5
(Indonesia) JPNW SND Factory Racing	Honda	Supra GTR 150	178	(Indonesia) Kiki Sudarman	1–5
(Malaysia) Voge AS25 Racing Team	Voge	FR150	66	(Malaysia) Afizi Supaat	1–5
(Malaysia) Voge AS25 Racing Team	Voge	FR150	92	(Malaysia) Muzakkir Mohamed	1–5
(Indonesia) HJS Youngstar Kawahara RCTH Sixty	Yamaha	MX King 150	52	(Indonesia) Dimas Juli Atmoko	1–5
(Indonesia) HJS Youngstar Kawahara RCTH Sixty	Yamaha	MX King 150	60	(Indonesia) Wahyu Aji Trilaksana	1–5
(Indonesia) MSGlowForMen Racing Team	Yamaha	MX King 150	38	(Indonesia) Wawan Wello	4
(Indonesia) SAE Racing Team	Yamaha	MX King 150	173	(Indonesia) Akbar Abud Afdalah	4
Yamaha LFN HP969 Indonesia Racing Team	Yamaha	MX King 150	70	(Indonesia) Syirat Syauqi	1–5
Yamaha LFN HP969 Indonesia Racing Team	Yamaha	MX King 150	117	(Indonesia) Fadli Rigani	1–5
Yamaha LFN HP969 Indonesia Racing Team	Yamaha	MX King 150	145	(Indonesia) Danial Damar	4
(Indonesia) Ziear LFN HP969 Adeline MCT RBT34	Yamaha	MX King 150	12	(Indonesia) Ilham Elsan Efendi	4
(Indonesia) Ziear LFN HP969 Adeline MCT RBT34	Yamaha	MX King 150	73	(Indonesia) Gupita Kresna	1–5
(Indonesia) Ziear LFN HP969 Adeline MCT RBT34	Yamaha	MX King 150	143	(Indonesia) Husni Fuadzy	1–5
(Philippines) 4S1M EVO Yamaha Racing Team	Yamaha	Sniper 150	25	(Philippines) John Emerson Inguito	1–5
(Philippines) 4S1M EVO Yamaha Racing Team	Yamaha	Sniper 150	129	(Indonesia) Rendi Odding	1–5
Racetech Yamaha Philippines Racing Team	Yamaha	Sniper 150	78	(Philippines) Timothy Jonathan	1–5
Racetech Yamaha Philippines Racing Team	Yamaha	Sniper 150	95	(Philippines) April King Mascardo	1–5
(Indonesia) Aben Racing	Yamaha	Y15 ZR	42	(Indonesia) Hafid Pratamaditya	4
(Malaysia) Aeon Credit JQK Zynergys Cardinals	Yamaha	Y15 ZR	11	(Malaysia) Ahmad Fazrul Sham	1–5
(Malaysia) Aeon Credit JQK Zynergys Cardinals	Yamaha	Y15 ZR	22	(Malaysia) Shafiq Rasol	1–5
(Thailand) One For All	Yamaha	Y15 ZR	58	(Indonesia) Silmi Helsinky	1–5
(Thailand) One For All	Yamaha	Y15 ZR	195	(Indonesia) Aqshal Ilham Safatullah	1–5
(Malaysia) UMA Racing Yamaha Maju Motor Asia Team	Yamaha	Y15 ZR	27	(Malaysia) Adib Arsyad	1–5
(Malaysia) UMA Racing Yamaha Maju Motor Asia Team	Yamaha	Y15 ZR	87	(Malaysia) Nazirul Izzat	1–5

Key
Regular rider
Wildcard rider
Replacement rider

=== TVS Racing International Championship Participants ===
2026 TVS Racing International Championship Entry List
Team	Constructor	Motorcycle	No.	Rider	Rounds
TVS AOM Racing	TVS	Apache RR310	1	(Malaysia) Ramdan Rosli	1–5
TVS AOM Racing	TVS	Apache RR310	2	(India) Sarthak Chavan	1–2, 4–5
TVS AOM Racing	TVS	Apache RR310	3	(Spain) Luis Miguel	1–5
TVS AOM Racing	TVS	Apache RR310	4	(India) Chiranth Vishwanath	1–5
TVS AOM Racing	TVS	Apache RR310	5	(Philippines) Leeandro Parades	1–4
TVS AOM Racing	TVS	Apache RR310	6	(Malaysia) Haziq Fairues	1
TVS AOM Racing	TVS	Apache RR310	7	(India) Rakshith Shihari	1–5
TVS AOM Racing	TVS	Apache RR310	8	(India) KY Ahamed	1, 3
TVS AOM Racing	TVS	Apache RR310	9	(Colombia) Jhon A Lopez	1–5
TVS AOM Racing	TVS	Apache RR310	10	(South Africa) Oratilwe Phiri	1–5
TVS AOM Racing	TVS	Apache RR310	11	(Portugal) Pedrinho Matos	1–5
TVS AOM Racing	TVS	Apache RR310	12	(Indonesia) Fadil Algassani	1–4
TVS AOM Racing	TVS	Apache RR310	13	(Japan) Jean Kento Turner	1–4
TVS AOM Racing	TVS	Apache RR310	14	(New Zealand) Tyler King	1–2
TVS AOM Racing	TVS	Apache RR310	15	(New Zealand) Nixon Frost	1
TVS AOM Racing	TVS	Apache RR310	16	(Malaysia) Naqib Rifqi	1–4
TVS AOM Racing	TVS	Apache RR310	17	(Thailand) Vorapong Malahuan	5
TVS AOM Racing	TVS	Apache RR310	18	(Thailand) Tosak Nuansai	2
TVS AOM Racing	TVS	Apache RR310	19	(Spain) Vicente Pérez	3–4
TVS AOM Racing	TVS	Apache RR310	20	(Nicaragua) Andoni Dominguez	3–5
TVS AOM Racing	TVS	Apache RR310	21	(India) Savion Sabu	4
TVS AOM Racing	TVS	Apache RR310	22	(Vietnam) Luca Agostinelli	5
TVS AOM Racing	TVS	Apache RR310	23	(Mexico) Diego Medina	5
TVS AOM Racing	TVS	Apache RR310	24	(Italy) Christian Borrelli	5
TVS AOM Racing	TVS	Apache RR310	25	(South Korea) Kim Min-jae	5

Key
Regular rider
Wildcard rider
Replacement rider

== Results ==
Round		Circuit	Date	ASB1000 Winners	ASS600 Winners	ASS250 Winners	UB150 Winners	TVS Racing International Winners
1	1	(Malaysia) Sepang 1	11 April	(Malaysia) Hafizh Syahrin	(Malaysia) Helmi Azman	(Thailand) Krittapat Keankum	(Indonesia) Gupita Kresna	(India) Sarthak Chavan
1	2	(Malaysia) Sepang 1	12 April	(Malaysia) Hafizh Syahrin	(Malaysia) Kasma Daniel	(Thailand) Krittapat Keankum	(Indonesia) Husni Fuadzy	(Malaysia) Ramdan Rosli
2	3	(Thailand) Chang 1	9 May	(Malaysia) Hafizh Syahrin	(Malaysia) Kasma Daniel	(Japan) Hiroki Ono	(Indonesia) Fadli Rigani	(Spain) Luis Miguel
2	4	(Thailand) Chang 1	10 May	(Malaysia) Hafizh Syahrin	(Thailand) Thanat Laoongplio	(Thailand) Krittapat Keankum	(Indonesia) Husni Fuadzy	(India) Sarthak Chavan
3	5	(Japan) Motegi	13 June	(Malaysia) Hafizh Syahrin	(Japan) Hikari Okubo	(Japan) Hiroki Ono	(Philippines) John Emerson Inguito	(India) Chiranth Vishwanath
3	6	(Japan) Motegi	14 June	(Malaysia) Hafizh Syahrin	(Japan) Hikari Okubo	(Japan) Hiroki Ono	(Indonesia) Syirat Syauqi	(Spain) Vicente Pérez
4	7	(Indonesia) Mandalika	8 August	(Malaysia) Hafizh Syahrin	(Indonesia) Wahyu Nugroho	(Thailand) Krittapat Keankum	(Indonesia) Husni Fuadzy	(Spain) Vicente Pérez
4	8	(Indonesia) Mandalika	9 August	(Malaysia) Hafizh Syahrin	(Thailand) Anupab Sarmoon	(Indonesia) Irfan Ardiansyah	(Indonesia) Husni Fuadzy	(Spain) Vicente Pérez
5	9	(Malaysia) Sepang 2	12 September	(Malaysia) Hafizh Syahrin	(Thailand) Thanat Laoongplio	(Thailand) Krittapat Keankum	(Indonesia) Husni Fuadzy	
5	10	(Malaysia) Sepang 2	13 September	(Japan) Kaito Toba	(Indonesia) Wahyu Nugroho	(Thailand) Krittapat Keankum	(Indonesia) Fadli Rigani	
5	9	(Italy) Misano	3 October					(Italy) Christian Borrelli
5	10	(Italy) Misano	4 October					(Italy) Christian Borrelli
6	11	(Thailand) Chang 2	5 December					
6	12	(Thailand) Chang 2	6 December					

== Championship standings ==
Points

Position	1st	2nd	3rd	4th	5th	6th	7th	8th	9th	10th	11th	12th	13th	14th	15th
Points	25	20	16	13	11	10	9	8	7	6	5	4	3	2	1

=== Riders standings ===
==== Asian Superbike 1000 ====
Pos.	Rider	Bike	SEP1 (Malaysia)		BUR1 (Thailand)		MOT (Japan)		MAN (Indonesia)		SEP2 (Malaysia)		BUR2 (Thailand)		Pts
Pos.	Rider	Bike	R1	R2	R1	R2	R1	R2	R1	R2	R1	R2	R1	R2	Pts
1	(Malaysia) Hafizh Syahrin	Ducati	1^{P}^{F}	1^{P}^{F}	1^{P}^{F}	1^{P}^{F}	1^{P}^{F}	1^{P}^{F}	1^{P}^{F}	1^{P}^{F}	1	2			245
2	(Japan) Keito Abe	Honda	2	2	3	2	2	2	2	2	3	3			188
3	(Thailand) Nakarin Atiratphuvapat	Honda	6	13	6	3	4	3	3	4	4	6			120
4	(Germany) Rocco Sessler	BMW	8	9	8	5	9	7	4	3	8	7			96
5	(Malaysia) Zaqhwan Zaidi	Honda	5	4	4	11	7	13	5	Ret	2	5			96
6	(Malaysia) Azroy Anuar	Honda	4	5	2	Ret	13	Ret	10	8	5	4			85
7	(Indonesia) Adenanta Putra	Honda	7	7	9	7	8	8	6	5	7	16			80
8	(Indonesia) Andi Farid Izdihar	Ducati	3	3	5	6	5	6							74
9	(Japan) Kazuki Watanabe	Aprilia	10	11	11	8	10	9	11	7	10	8			65
10	(Australia) Lachlan Epis	BMW	Ret	6	7	4	Ret	10	7	Ret	Ret	11			52
11	(United Kingdom) Joe Francis	Yamaha	12	12	12	9	12	11	12	9	11	10			50
12	(Japan) Shota Ite	Yamaha					3	4							29
13	(Australia) Josh Waters	Ducati							9	6	12	9			28
14	(Australia) Anthony West	Yamaha	11	10					8	Ret	9	Ret			26
15	(Japan) Kaito Toba	BMW									Ret^{P}^{F}	1^{P}^{F}			25
16	(Malaysia) Adam Norrodin	Suzuki	9	8							6	Ret			25
17	(Malaysia) Fahmi Abdul Wahaf	BMW	13	DNS	14	12	15	14	13	10	15	14			24
18	(Japan) Kohta Arakawa	Honda					6	5							21
19	(Australia) Olly Simpson	Yamaha			10	10	11	Ret							17
20	(Malaysia) Chan Qing Rong	BMW	14	Ret	15	Ret			14	11	14	13			15
21	(India) Abhijith Satya Prasad	BMW									13	12			7
22	(Japan) Shogo Kawasaki	Aprilia					14	12							6
23	(Australia) Declan Carberry	BMW			13	Ret									3
24	(Chinese Taipei) Lee Po Yu	Suzuki									16	15			1
	(Malaysia) Teo Yew Joe	BMW	DNS	DNS											

Colour	Result
Gold	Winner
Silver	Second place
Bronze	Third place
Green	Points classification
Blue	Non-points classification
Blue	Non-classified finish (NC)
Purple	Retired, not classified (Ret)
Red	Did not qualify (DNQ)
Red	Did not pre-qualify (DNPQ)
Black	Disqualified (DSQ)
White	Did not start (DNS)
White	Withdrew (WD)
White	Race cancelled (C)
Blank	Did not practice (DNP)
Blank	Did not arrive (DNA)
Blank	Excluded (EX)

P – Pole position
F – Fastest lap

==== Supersport 600 ====
Pos.	Rider	Bike	SEP1 (Malaysia)		BUR1 (Thailand)		MOT (Japan)		MAN (Indonesia)		SEP2 (Malaysia)		BUR2 (Thailand)		Pts
Pos.	Rider	Bike	R1	R2	R1	R2	R1	R2	R1	R2	R1	R2	R1	R2	Pts
1	(Malaysia) Kasma Daniel	Yamaha	7	1^{F}	1^{P}	4^{P}	2^{P}	6^{P}	2^{P}	11^{P}	6^{P}^{F}	2^{P}			157
2	(Thailand) Anupab Sarmoon	Yamaha	2^{F}	12	3	2	4	2	Ret^{F}	1	2	3			154
3	(Thailand) Thanat Laoongplio	Honda	8	3	2	1^{F}	5	3^{F}	3	10	1	Ret			143
4	(Indonesia) Wahyu Nugroho	Yamaha	4	6	5^{F}	7	7	10	1	4	3	1			137
5	(Indonesia) Herjun Firdaus	Honda	3	7	4	Ret	3^{F}	4	8	3	4	6			114
6	(Philippines) Mckinley Kyle Paz	Yamaha	5	4	Ret	3	9	7	4	2^{F}	7	7			107
7	(Malaysia) Helmi Azman	Honda	1	2	6	10	14	13	10	5	5	5^{F}			105
8	(Indonesia) Faerozi Toreqottullah	Yamaha	Ret	9	8	5	11	12	7	6	11	4			72
9	(Malaysia) Khairul Idham Pawi	Honda	Ret^{P}	8^{P}	12	9	8	8	6	7	8	8			70
10	(Japan) Hikari Okubo	Honda					1	1							50
11	(Malaysia) Izam Ikmal	Yamaha	9	14	11	12	13	15	11	Ret	9	9			41
12	(Indonesia) Arbi Aditama	Honda	6	5	7	8									38
13	(Indonesia) Dimas Ekky Pratama	Honda	10	11	9	11	15	14			10	10			38
14	(Thailand) Kitsada Tanachot	Honda	Ret	10	Ret	6	10	9	Ret	DNS					29
15	(China) Zhao Tianhao	Yamaha	Ret	13	10	13	16	16	12	12	12	11			29
16	(Thailand) Apiwat Wongthananon	Yamaha					6	5							21
17	(Indonesia) Arai Agaska	Yamaha							5	8					19
18	(Indonesia) Felix Mulya	Honda							9	9					14
19	(Japan) Keisuke Tanaka	Yamaha					12	11							9

Colour	Result
Gold	Winner
Silver	Second place
Bronze	Third place
Green	Points classification
Blue	Non-points classification
Blue	Non-classified finish (NC)
Purple	Retired, not classified (Ret)
Red	Did not qualify (DNQ)
Red	Did not pre-qualify (DNPQ)
Black	Disqualified (DSQ)
White	Did not start (DNS)
White	Withdrew (WD)
White	Race cancelled (C)
Blank	Did not practice (DNP)
Blank	Did not arrive (DNA)
Blank	Excluded (EX)

P – Pole position
F – Fastest lap

==== Asia Production 250 ====
Pos.	Rider	Bike	SEP1 (Malaysia)		BUR1 (Thailand)		MOT (Japan)		MAN (Indonesia)		SEP2 (Malaysia)		BUR2 (Thailand)		Pts
Pos.	Rider	Bike	R1	R2	R1	R2	R1	R2	R1	R2	R1	R2	R1	R2	Pts
1	(Thailand) Krittapat Keankum	Yamaha	1	1^{F}	5^{P}	1^{P}	3	6	1^{P}	Ret^{P}	1	1			187
2	(Indonesia) Rheza Danica Ahrens	Honda	5^{P}	2^{P}	2	4	5	9	6	Ret	3^{F}	Ret^{F}			108
3	(Indonesia) Irfan Ardiansyah	Honda			14	7	2	2	10	1^{F}	5	4			106
4	(Indonesia) Candra Hermawan	Yamaha	Ret	3	9	3	4	3	4	18	10	5			98
5	(Indonesia) Gerry Salim	Honda	2	9	13	Ret	8	11^{F}	3	16	4	3			88
6	(Indonesia) Fadhil Musyavi	Yamaha	Ret	5	16	11	Ret	5	13	3	2^{P}	2^{P}			86
7	(Japan) Hiroki Ono	Honda			1	8	1	1	22	Ret					83
8	(Thailand) Panjaruch Chitwirulchat	Honda	4	4	3^{F}	2	Ret	17	15	15	7	13			76
9	(Malaysia) Danial Syahmi	Yamaha	3	11	10	10	9	Ret	9	7	6	10			72
10	(Japan) Riichi Takahira	Yamaha	Ret	6	8	9	11	4	16^{F}	2					63
11	(Thailand) Peerapong Luiboonpeng	Yamaha	8	8	11	Ret	6	12	14	10	8	7			60
12	(Indonesia) Fahmi Basam	Yamaha	Ret	19	4	6	Ret^{P}	7^{P}	2	Ret	Ret	Ret			52
13	(Thailand) Teeranai Tubtim	Yamaha	10	Ret	6	5			8	6					45
14	(Vietnam) Nguyễn Hữu Trí	Honda	9	12	17	17	16	24	7	4	Ret	8			41
15	(Japan) Aiki Iyoshi	Honda	7	13	12	14	7^{F}	13	12	11	18	21			39
16	(Indonesia) Aldiaz Ismaya	Yamaha	14	14	15	15	12	14	11	9	9	14			33
17	(Indonesia) Galang Hendra Pratama	Yamaha	12	7	Ret	13	10	10	Ret	DNS	15	15			30
18	(Indonesia) Badly Ayatullah	Honda	Ret	DNS					Ret	5	11	6			26
19	(Indonesia) Reykat Yusuf Fadilah	Yamaha							5	8	17	12			23
20	(Vietnam) Ngô Nguyễn Việt Tuấn	Honda	6^{F}	10							19	18			16
21	(Japan) Taiyo Saito	Honda	11	15					18	13	14	11			16
22	(Malaysia) Irfan Haykal	Honda	13	17	18	12	13	15	Ret	Ret	DNS	DNS			11
23	(Indonesia) Andy Muhammad Fadly	Kawasaki			7	Ret			19	Ret	Ret	17			9
24	(Japan) Rintaro Takemoto	Yamaha					23	8							8
25	(Malaysia) Ahmad Afif Amran	Yamaha					20	Ret	21	23	Ret	9			7
26	(China) Gao Zi'ang	Yamaha	15	20	20	18	14	Ret	Ret	20	12	19			7
27	(Spain) Unai Calatayud	Kawasaki	Ret	16			Ret	16	17	12	16	20			4
28	(Malaysia) Idil Fitri Mahadi	Yamaha			Ret	22	Ret	20	Ret	19	13	16			3
29	(Singapore) Jazil Juraimi	Yamaha	Ret	21	25	21	18	Ret	24	14	22	23			2
30	(Japan) Teppei Kugawa	Honda					15	Ret							1
31	(China) Sha Juntong	Yamaha	16	18							20	Ret			0
32	(China) Shuncheng Zhang	Kawasaki	20	24	19	16	Ret	21	20	DSQ					0
33	(Japan) Raiku Hasegawa	Honda			22	20	17	19	Ret	21	21	Ret			0
34	(Philippines) Carlsen Jacob Solis	Honda	17	Ret	23	Ret	19	23	23	17	23	22			0
35	(Hong Kong) Leong Nang Tse	Yamaha	18	25							26	Ret			0
36	(Japan) Hinata Okada	Yamaha					Ret	18							0
37	(China) Zhan Junhao	Yamaha			21	19									0
38	(Philippines) Christwil Villanueva	Yamaha	19	26											0
39	(Australia) Hunter Corney	Yamaha					21	22							0
40	(India) Kabilesh Rajini	Yamaha	21	22											0
41	(Japan) Shota Yokoyama	Yamaha	22	23	24	23									0
42	(China) Lu Yin	Yamaha			26	24	22	25							0
43	(Hong Kong) Zhong Wen Ze	Yamaha							Ret	22					0
44	(India) Sethu Rajiv	Honda	23	27	27	25	Ret	Ret							0
45	(Chinese Taipei) Liu Chun Mei	Yamaha									24	24			0
46	(Japan) Ryuji Yokoe	Yamaha					24	26							0
47	(Chinese Taipei) Cheng Li Sheng	Yamaha									25	25			0
	(Thailand) Pacharagorn Thonggerdloung	Honda			DNS	DNS									

Colour	Result
Gold	Winner
Silver	Second place
Bronze	Third place
Green	Points classification
Blue	Non-points classification
Blue	Non-classified finish (NC)
Purple	Retired, not classified (Ret)
Red	Did not qualify (DNQ)
Red	Did not pre-qualify (DNPQ)
Black	Disqualified (DSQ)
White	Did not start (DNS)
White	Withdrew (WD)
White	Race cancelled (C)
Blank	Did not practice (DNP)
Blank	Did not arrive (DNA)
Blank	Excluded (EX)

P – Pole position
F – Fastest lap

==== Underbone 150 ====
Pos.	Rider	Bike	SEP1 (Malaysia)		BUR1 (Thailand)		MOT (Japan)		MAN (Indonesia)		SEP2 (Malaysia)		BUR2 (Thailand)		Pts
Pos.	Rider	Bike	R1	R2	R1	R2	R1	R2	R1	R2	R1	R2	R1	R2	Pts
1	(Indonesia) Husni Fuadzy	Yamaha	3	1	3^{P}	1^{P}	7	3	1^{P}	1^{P}	1	Ret			182
2	(Indonesia) Fadli Rigani	Yamaha	7	13	1	Ret	16	Ret	4^{F}	4	2	1			108
3	(Indonesia) Rendi Odding	Yamaha	5	16	4	11^{F}	2	2	2	15	10	DNS			96
4	(Indonesia) Dimas Juli Atmoko	Yamaha	2^{P}	Ret^{P}	6	4	3^{P}	6^{P}	Ret	3	6^{P}	Ret^{P}			95
5	(Indonesia) Syirat Syauqi	Yamaha	8^{F}	12	10	5	5	1^{F}	Ret	2	7	Ret			94
6	(Philippines) April King Mascardo	Yamaha	14	2	11	8	8	7	12	12	4	5			84
7	(Malaysia) Ahmad Darwisy	Honda	11	11	7^{F}	2	4	Ret	13	Ret	13	2^{F}			78
8	(Malaysia) Shahrol Syazras	Honda	12	4	12	7	11	13	Ret	10	3	3			76
9	(Indonesia) Aqshal Ilham Safatullah	Yamaha	13	3	8	9	Ret	Ret	5	8	12	7			66
10	(Indonesia) Wahyu Aji Trilaksana	Yamaha	4	14	2	Ret	9	10	3	22	19	Ret			64
11	(Philippines) John Emerson Inguito	Yamaha	10	8	15	Ret	1	4	20	Ret	8	14			63
12	(Indonesia) Gupita Kresna	Yamaha	1	9	5	15	6	Ret	18	18	Ret	11			59
13	(Indonesia) Aditya Fauzi	Honda	6	7^{F}	9	3	Ret^{F}	8	8	Ret	18	Ret			58
14	(Malaysia) Adib Arsyad	Yamaha	15	6	Ret	16	14	Ret	7	11	5^{F}	15			39
15	(Malaysia) Nazirul Izzat	Yamaha	16	Ret	21	Ret	Ret	5	11	13	14	4			34
16	(Malaysia) Ahmad Fazrul Sham	Yamaha	21	17	20	12	10	12	15	17	11	8			28
17	(Indonesia) Silmi Helsinky	Yamaha	Ret	5	19	6	Ret	Ret	Ret	Ret	Ret	12			25
18	(Philippines) Timothy Jonathan	Yamaha	17	15	14	13	18	Ret	19	21	9	6			23
19	(Malaysia) Shafiq Rasol	Yamaha	21	10	13	14	17	11	14	14	DSQ	13			23
20	(Malaysia) Muzakkir Mohamed	Voge	18	Ret	16	10	13	9	23	20	16	10			22
21	(Indonesia) Akbar Abud Afdalah	Yamaha							9	5^{F}					18
22	(Indonesia) Danial Damar	Yamaha							6	9					17
23	(Indonesia) Ilham Elsan Efendi	Yamaha							10	6					16
24	(Indonesia) Kiki Sudarman	Honda	9	Ret	18	Ret	12	14	16	16	15	Ret			14
25	(Indonesia) Hafid Pratamaditya	Yamaha							17	7					9
26	(Malaysia) Afizi Supaat	Voge	19	Ret	17	Ret	15	Ret	22	19	17	9			8
27	(Indonesia) Wawan Wello	Yamaha							21	Ret					0

Colour	Result
Gold	Winner
Silver	Second place
Bronze	Third place
Green	Points classification
Blue	Non-points classification
Blue	Non-classified finish (NC)
Purple	Retired, not classified (Ret)
Red	Did not qualify (DNQ)
Red	Did not pre-qualify (DNPQ)
Black	Disqualified (DSQ)
White	Did not start (DNS)
White	Withdrew (WD)
White	Race cancelled (C)
Blank	Did not practice (DNP)
Blank	Did not arrive (DNA)
Blank	Excluded (EX)

P – Pole position
F – Fastest lap

==== TVS Asia One Make Championship ====
Pos.	Rider	SEP1 (Malaysia)		BUR1 (Thailand)		MOT (Japan)		MAN (Indonesia)		MIS (Italy)		BUR2 (Thailand)		Pts
Pos.	Rider	R1	R2	R1	R2	R1	R2	R1	R2	R1	R2	R1	R2	Pts
1	(Malaysia) Ramdan Rosli	2	1^{F}	2^{P}	2^{P}	3	8	5	4	5^{F}	4			157
2	(Spain) Luis Miguel	Ret	3	1	Ret	4^{F}	6	3	3	4	2			129
3	(Portugal) Pedrinho Matos	Ret^{P}	7^{P}	Ret	3	9	2	2	2	3^{P}	3^{P}^{F}			124
4	(India) Sarthak Chavan	1^{F}	2	6	1^{F}			6	14	7	6			111
5	(South Africa) Oratilwe Phiri	5	5	3	11	5	3	11	15	6	5			97
6	(Spain) Vicente Pérez					2^{P}	1^{P}^{F}	1^{P}	1^{P}^{F}					95
7	(India) Chiranth Vishwanath	6	Ret	10	8	1	4	7^{F}	13	10	8			88
8	(Colombia) Jhon A Lopez	9	10	8^{F}	6	7	7	9	6	8	10			80
9	(Japan) Jean Kento Turner	12	8	7	5	11	10	4	5					67
10	(Malaysia) Naqib Rifqi	4	Ret	5	4	Ret	9	8	7					61
11	(India) Rakshith Shihari	8	Ret	4	9	10	11	12	11	11	12			57
12	(Italy) Christian Borrelli									1	1			50
13	(Philippines) Leeandro Parades	7	Ret	Ret	10	8	5	10	9					47
14	(Vietnam) Luca Agostinelli									2	7			29
15	(Malaysia) Haziq Fairues	3	6											26
16	(Nicaragua) Andoni Dominguez					6	DNS	Ret	12	Ret	9			21
17	(New Zealand) Tyler King	Ret	4	9	Ret									20
18	(Indonesia) Fadil Algassani	10	Ret	Ret	Ret	Ret	12	14	8					20
19	(Thailand) Tosak Nuansai			11	7									14
20	(India) KY Ahamed	Ret	9			12	13							14
21	(Thailand) Vorapong Malahuan									9	11			12
22	(India) Savion Sabu							13	10					9
23	(South Korea) Kim Min-jae									12	13			7
24	(New Zealand) Nixon Frost	11	Ret											5
25	(Mexico) Diego Medina									13	14			5

Colour	Result
Gold	Winner
Silver	Second place
Bronze	Third place
Green	Points classification
Blue	Non-points classification
Blue	Non-classified finish (NC)
Purple	Retired, not classified (Ret)
Red	Did not qualify (DNQ)
Red	Did not pre-qualify (DNPQ)
Black	Disqualified (DSQ)
White	Did not start (DNS)
White	Withdrew (WD)
White	Race cancelled (C)
Blank	Did not practice (DNP)
Blank	Did not arrive (DNA)
Blank	Excluded (EX)

P – Pole position
F – Fastest lap
