= 2023 Asia Talent Cup =

Motorcycle road racing season

2023 Asia Talent Cup
Previous:	2022	Next:	2024

The 2023 Idemitsu Asia Talent Cup was the ninth running of the Asia Talent Cup, a motorcycle racing series organized by Dorna and sponsored by Idemitsu which is intended for young riders throughout Asia and Oceania. The season features six rounds at circuits in Asia, with all but the first round being held as support races for the MotoGP World Championship. The season commenced at Sepang on 18 August, and is scheduled to conclude at Losail on 19 November.

Indonesian rider Veda Ega Pratama dominated the championship in his second full season, winning nine of the season's twelve races and clinching the title with one round to go. Fellow series returnee Amon Odaki finished in second, some 103 points adrift of Pratama, while Ryota Ogiwara finished in third as the highest-placed rookie.

== Entry list ==
The entry list of selected riders was released on 26 January 2023. All riders compete on identical 250cc Honda NSF250R motorcycles.

No.	Rider	Rounds
2	(Japan) Zen Mitani	All
3	(Malaysia) Adi Putra	All
5	(Indonesia) Chessy Meilandri	All
6	(Australia) Levi Kwan Russo	All
7	(Indonesia) Veda Ega Pratama	All
8	(Malaysia) Farres Putra	1–5
9	(Japan) Riichi Takahira	All
10	(Thailand) Burapa Wanmoon	1–4
11	(India) Sarthak Chavan	1, 3–6
12	(Australia) Marianos Nikolis	All
13	(Indonesia) Jorge Raphael Gading	All
14	(Japan) Amon Odaki	All
15	(Indonesia) Reykat Yusuf Fadilah	1–4
16	(Japan) Ryota Ogiwara	All
17	(Malaysia) Ahmad Darwisy	All
18	(Indonesia) Hafizd Fahril Rasyadan	All
19	(Malaysia) Farish Hafiy	All
20	(Thailand) Jakkreephat Phuettisan	All
21	(Japan) Shinya Ezawa	All
22	(Japan) Kakeru Okunuki	2
22	(Indonesia) Kiandra Ramadhipa	3
22	(Thailand) Kitsada Tanachot	4
22	(Qatar) Mohammed Binladin	6
23	(Qatar) Hamad Al-Sahouti	All
24	(Indonesia) Decksa Almer Alfarezel	3
24	(Thailand) Kiattisak Singhapong	4–6

== Calendar and results ==
The season calendar was revealed on 14 November 2022, and features six rounds in five countries.

Rnd.		Circuit	Date	Pole position	Fastest lap	Winning driver
1	1	(Malaysia) Sepang International Circuit, Sepang	19 August	(Indonesia) Veda Ega Pratama	(Japan) Amon Odaki	(Japan) Riichi Takahira
1	2	(Malaysia) Sepang International Circuit, Sepang	20 August		(Indonesia) Veda Ega Pratama	(Indonesia) Veda Ega Pratama
2	3	(Japan) Mobility Resort Motegi, Motegi	30 September	(Japan) Amon Odaki	(Indonesia) Veda Ega Pratama	(Indonesia) Veda Ega Pratama
2	4	(Japan) Mobility Resort Motegi, Motegi	1 October		(Indonesia) Veda Ega Pratama	(Indonesia) Veda Ega Pratama
3	5	(Indonesia) Mandalika International Street Circuit, Central Lombok Regency	14 October	(Indonesia) Veda Ega Pratama	(Japan) Amon Odaki	(Indonesia) Veda Ega Pratama
3	6	(Indonesia) Mandalika International Street Circuit, Central Lombok Regency	15 October		(Indonesia) Veda Ega Pratama	(Indonesia) Veda Ega Pratama
4	7	(Thailand) Chang International Circuit, Buriram	28 October	(Indonesia) Veda Ega Pratama	(Thailand) Jakkreephat Phuettisan	(Thailand) Jakkreephat Phuettisan
4	8	(Thailand) Chang International Circuit, Buriram	29 October		(Indonesia) Veda Ega Pratama	(Indonesia) Veda Ega Pratama
5	9	(Malaysia) Sepang International Circuit, Sepang	11 November	(Japan) Riichi Takahira	(Japan) Shinya Ezawa	(Japan) Amon Odaki
5	10	(Malaysia) Sepang International Circuit, Sepang	12 November		(Indonesia) Veda Ega Pratama	(Indonesia) Veda Ega Pratama
6	11	(Qatar) Losail International Circuit, Losail	18 November	(Indonesia) Veda Ega Pratama	(Indonesia) Veda Ega Pratama	(Indonesia) Veda Ega Pratama
6	12	(Qatar) Losail International Circuit, Losail	19 November		(Indonesia) Veda Ega Pratama	(Indonesia) Veda Ega Pratama

== Championship standings ==
Scoring system
Points are awarded to the top fifteen finishers. A rider has to finish the race to earn points.

Position	1st	2nd	3rd	4th	5th	6th	7th	8th	9th	10th	11th	12th	13th	14th	15th
Points	25	20	16	13	11	10	9	8	7	6	5	4	3	2	1

Pos.	Rider	MAL1 (Malaysia)		JPN (Japan)		IDN (Indonesia)		THA (Thailand)		MAL2 (Malaysia)		QAT (Qatar)		Pts
Pos.	Rider	R1	R2	R1	R2	R1	R2	R1	R2	R1	R2	R1	R2	Pts
1	(Indonesia) Veda Ega Pratama	2	1	1	1	1	1	5	1	Ret	1	1	1	256
2	(Japan) Amon Odaki	4	Ret	3	Ret	2	3	3	2	1	5	Ret	3	153
3	(Japan) Ryota Ogiwara	6	4	4	6	Ret	4	7	4	4	3	2	2	150
4	(Thailand) Jakkreephat Phuettisan	7	5	7	3	5	6	1	3	3	7	7	9	148
5	(Japan) Zen Mitani	3	3	2	Ret	3	2	4	Ret	Ret	2	6	6	141
6	(Japan) Riichi Takahira	1	2	6	Ret	9	8	6	5	Ret	4	5	4	128
7	(Japan) Shinya Ezawa			5	2	Ret	5	2	Ret	2	Ret	3	5	109
8	(Qatar) Hamad Al-Sahouti	9	6	9	4	15	11	11	10	5	Ret	11	10	76
9	(Malaysia) Farish Hafiy	12	9	Ret	5	4	7	Ret	6	Ret	Ret	8	7	71
10	(Australia) Marianos Nikolis	DNS	DNS	Ret	11	7	9	8	7	Ret	8	4	8	67
11	(Malaysia) Farres Putra	8	8	8	9	13	10	12	8	Ret	DNS			52
12	(Indonesia) Hafizd Fahril Rasyadan	11	7	Ret	8	18	Ret	Ret	12	Ret	9	12	12	41
13	(Indonesia) Chessy Meilandri	16	11	10	Ret	10	13	14	14	7	11	14	15	41
14	(Indonesia) Reykat Yusuf Fadilah	5	Ret	12	Ret	6	Ret	10	9					38
15	(Australia) Levi Kwan Russo	15	13	11	12	Ret	15	15	13	6	6	18	17	38
16	(Thailand) Kiattisak Singhapong							9	11	8	10	9	13	36
17	(Malaysia) Ahmad Darwisy	10	10	15	10	14	14	13	16	Ret	13	15	Ret	30
18	(Thailand) Burapa Wanmoon	13	14	Ret	7	12	16	Ret	DNS					18
19	(Indonesia) Jorge Raphael Gading	17	12	13	13	16	Ret	16	19	Ret	DNS	13	11	18
20	(India) Sarthak Chavan	14	Ret			19	Ret	Ret	18	9	12	16	16	13
21	(Malaysia) Adi Putra	18	15	14	14	17	17	17	17	10	14	17	18	13
22	(Indonesia) Kiandra Ramadhipa					11	12							9
23	(Indonesia) Decksa Almer Alfarezel					8	Ret							8
24	(Qatar) Mohammed Binladin											10	14	8
25	(Thailand) Kitsada Tanachot							18	15					1
—	(Japan) Kakeru Okunuki			Ret	Ret									0
Pos.	Rider	R1	R2	R1	R2	R1	R2	R1	R2	R1	R2	R1	R2	Pts
Pos.	Rider	MAL1 (Malaysia)		JPN (Japan)		IDN (Indonesia)		THA (Thailand)		MAL2 (Malaysia)		QAT (Qatar)		Pts
