= 2024 Asia Road Racing Championship =

29th season Asia Road Racing Championship

2024 Asia Road Racing Championship
Previous:	2023	Next:	2025

The 2024 Idemitsu FIM Asia Road Racing Championship is the 29th season of the Asia Road Racing Championship. The season started on 15 March at Chang International Circuit in Thailand and will end on 8 December back at Chang International Circuit.

== Calendar and results ==
Round	Circuit	Date	ASB1000 Winners	ASS600 Winners	ASS250 Winners	UB150 Winners	TVS Asia Winners
1	(Thailand) Chang International Circuit	15–17 March	R1: (Malaysia) Azlan Shah	R1: (Thailand) Apiwat Wongthananon	R1: (Indonesia) Faerozi Toreqottullah	R1: (Indonesia) Fahmi Basam	R1: (Japan) Hiroki Ono
1	(Thailand) Chang International Circuit	15–17 March	R2: (Indonesia) Andi Farid Izdihar	R2: (Thailand) Apiwat Wongthananon	R2: (Indonesia) Herjun Atna Firdaus	R2: (Malaysia) Afif Amran	R2: (Japan) Hiroki Ono
2	(China) Zhuhai International Circuit	19–21 April	R1: (Malaysia) Hafizh Syahrin	R1: (Malaysia) Azroy Anuar	R1: (Vietnam) Cao Viet Nam	R1: (Philippines) Gian Carlo Mauricio	R1: (Japan) Hiroki Ono
2	(China) Zhuhai International Circuit	19–21 April	Race cancelled (Note: Race 2 of Round 2, IDEMITSU FIM ASIA ROAD RACING CHAMPIONSHIP at Zhuhai International Circuit (ZIC) is cancelled due to typhoon warning.)				
3	(Japan) Mobility Resort Motegi	7–9 June	R1: (Japan) Sho Nishimura	R1: (Thailand) Apiwat Wongthananon	R1: (Indonesia) Kiandra Ramadhipa	R1: (Indonesia) Gupita Kresna Wardhana	R1: (Japan) Hiroki Ono
3	(Japan) Mobility Resort Motegi	7–9 June	R2: (Japan) Yuki Kunii	R2: (Japan) Kengo Nagao	R2: (Indonesia) Kiandra Ramadhipa	R2: (Malaysia) Akid Aziz	R2: (Japan) Hiroki Ono
4	(Indonesia) Mandalika International Street Circuit	26–28 July	R1: (Indonesia) Andi Farid Izdihar	R1: (Malaysia) Azroy Anuar	R1: (Indonesia) Reynaldo Ratukore	R1: (Indonesia) Fahmi Basam	R1: (Japan) Hiroki Ono
4	(Indonesia) Mandalika International Street Circuit	26–28 July	R1: (Japan) Soichiro Minamimoto	R2: (Indonesia) Adenanta Putra	R2: (Indonesia) Faerozi Toreqottullah	R2: (Malaysia) Akid Aziz	R2: (Malaysia) Ramdan Rosli
5	(Malaysia) Sepang International Circuit	13–15 September	R1: (Japan) Yuki Kunii	R1: (Malaysia) Helmi Azman	R1: (Indonesia) Herjun Atna Firdaus	R1: (Indonesia) Fahmi Basam	R1: (Japan) Hiroki Ono
5	(Malaysia) Sepang International Circuit	13–15 September	R2: (Japan) Yuki Kunii	R2: (Malaysia) Azroy Anuar	R2: (Indonesia) Faerozi Toreqottullah	R2: (Malaysia) Fazrul Sham	R2: (Germany) Rocco Sessler
6	(Thailand) Chang International Circuit	6–8 December	R1: (Indonesia) Andi Farid Izdihar	R1: (Thailand) Apiwat Wongthananon	R1: (Indonesia) Kiandra Ramadhipa	R1: (Indonesia) Murobbil Vittoni	R1: (Japan) Hiroki Ono
6	(Thailand) Chang International Circuit	6–8 December	R2: (Japan) Yuki Kunii	R2: (Thailand) Apiwat Wongthananon	R2: (Vietnam) Cao Viet Nam	R2: (Indonesia) Fahmi Basam	R2: (Japan) Hiroki Ono

=== Calendar changes ===
- The Japanese round will be held at Mobility Resort Motegi, moving away from Sportsland Sugo held last year.
- The Chinese and Malaysian rounds are swapped, with Zhuhai International Circuit hosting the second round and Sepang International Circuit hosting the fifth round of the calendar.

Footnotes

== Teams and riders ==
2024 ASB1000 Entry List
Team	Constructor	Motorcycle	No.	Rider	Rounds
(Malaysia) Savitar ESG Team Asia	BMW	BMW M1000RR	16	(Malaysia) Teo Yew Joe	1–5
(Malaysia) Savitar ESG Team Asia	BMW	BMW M1000RR	98	(Japan) Akito Haga	6
(China) JIM777Y Racing Team	BMW	BMW M1000RR	19	(China) Chen Hongyan	2
(Malaysia) TKKR BMW Racing Team	BMW	BMW M1000RR	12	(Japan) Sho Nishimura	2–6
(Malaysia) TKKR BMW Racing Team	BMW	BMW M1000RR	25	(Malaysia) Azlan Shah	All
(Malaysia) TKKR BMW Racing Team	BMW	BMW M1000RR	28	(Germany) Markus Reiterberger	1
(Australia) Evolution Sports Group	BMW	BMW M1000RR	83	(Australia) Lachlan Epis	1–4, 6
(Malaysia) JDT Racing Team	Ducati	Panigale V4 R	55	(Malaysia) Hafizh Syahrin	All
(Malaysia) FGRT Project	Ducati	Panigale V4 R	66	(Malaysia) Ibrahim Norrodin	5
(Japan) Honda Asia-Dream Racing with Astemo	Honda	CBR1000RR-R Fireblade SP	21	(Malaysia) Zaqhwan Zaidi	1, 3–6
(Japan) Honda Asia-Dream Racing with Astemo	Honda	CBR1000RR-R Fireblade SP	23	(Indonesia) Andi Farid Izdihar	All
(Japan) Honda Asia-Dream Racing with Astemo	Honda	CBR1000RR-R Fireblade SP	41	(Thailand) Nakarin Atiratphuvapat	All
(Thailand) Astemo SI Racing with Thai Honda	Honda	CBR1000RR-R Fireblade SP	30	(Japan) Kosuke Sakumoto	5
(Thailand) Astemo SI Racing with Thai Honda	Honda	CBR1000RR-R Fireblade SP	45	(Japan) Tetsuta Nagashima	6
(Thailand) Astemo SI Racing with Thai Honda	Honda	CBR1000RR-R Fireblade SP	52	(Thailand) Passawit Thitivararak	1–3
(Philippines) SDG Team HARC-PRO Honda Ph.	Honda	CBR1000RR-R Fireblade SP	91	(Japan) Yuki Kunii	All
(Chinese Taipei) aRacer-SpeedTek	Yamaha	YZF-R1M	11	(Chinese Taipei) Chiang Chih-ying	3, 5–6
(Thailand) Yamaha TNP Pitt Lubricants	Yamaha	YZF-R1M	29	(Thailand) Natetan Thonokoat	6
(Japan) OGURA CLUTCH■ NITRO RACING	Yamaha	YZF-R1M	31	(Japan) Shota Yokoyama	3
(Indonesia) Yamaha CARGLOSS RRS	Yamaha	YZF-R1M	77	(Indonesia) Eric Saputra	4
(Japan) Yamaha Tekhne Racing Team Asia	Yamaha	YZF-R1M	22	(Japan) Soichiro Minamimoto	All
(Japan) Yamaha Tekhne Racing Team Asia	Yamaha	YZF-R1M	27	(Malaysia) Kasma Daniel	All
(Malaysia) Victor Racing	Yamaha	YZF-R1M	44	(Yemen) Osama Mareai	All
2024 SS600 Entry List
Team	Constructor	Motorcycle	No.	Rider	Rounds
(Malaysia) Idemitsu Boon Siew Honda Racing Team	Honda	CBR600RR	20	(Malaysia) Azroy Anuar	All
(Malaysia) Idemitsu Boon Siew Honda Racing Team	Honda	CBR600RR	32	(Malaysia) Helmi Azman	All
(Indonesia) Astra Honda Racing Team	Honda	CBR600RR	21	(Indonesia) Adenanta Putra	All
(Indonesia) Astra Honda Racing Team	Honda	CBR600RR	54	(Indonesia) Veda Ega Pratama	1, 3–6
(Indonesia) Astra Honda Racing Team	Honda	CBR600RR	93	(Indonesia) Fadillah Arbi Aditama	4
(Indonesia) Astra Honda Racing Team	Honda	CBR600RR	123	(Indonesia) Rheza Danica Ahrens	All
Astemo SI Racing with Thai Honda Honda Racing Thailand	Honda	CBR600RR	31	(Thailand) Thanat Laoongplio	All
Astemo SI Racing with Thai Honda Honda Racing Thailand	Honda	CBR600RR	85	(Thailand) Kiattisak Singhapong	All
(Indonesia) MsGlowForMen Racing Team	Honda	CBR600RR	99	(Indonesia) Dimas Ekky Pratama	4
(China) SILVER STEED Racing Team	Kawasaki	ZX-6R	15	(China) Zhou Fenglong	2
(Malaysia) Victor Racing	Yamaha	YZF-R6	22	(China) Sha Juntong	All
(Japan) Yamaha Tekhne Racing Team Asia	Yamaha	YZF-R6	23	(Philippines) Mckinley Kyle Paz	All
(Japan) Yamaha Tekhne Racing Team Asia	Yamaha	YZF-R6	24	(Thailand) Apiwat Wongthananon	All
(Japan) Taira Promote Racing	Yamaha	YZF-R6	48	(Japan) Shinya Mikami	3
(Japan) Team Kenken	Yamaha	YZF-R6	50	(Japan) Kengo Nagao	3
Yamaha Thailand Racing Team	Yamaha	YZF-R6	56	(Thailand) Ratthapong Wilairot	6
Yamaha Racing Indonesia	Yamaha	YZF-R6	49	(Japan) Rei Matsuoka	1, 3
Yamaha Racing Indonesia	Yamaha	YZF-R6	50	(Japan) Kengo Nagao	4–5
Yamaha Racing Indonesia	Yamaha	YZF-R6	64	(Japan) Yuta Date	6
Yamaha Racing Indonesia	Yamaha	YZF-R6	89	(Indonesia) Wahyu Nugroho	All
Yamaha Racing Indonesia	Yamaha	YZF-R6	108	(Indonesia) Andy Muhammad Fadly	0 (6)
(China) JIM777Y Racing Team	Yamaha	YZF-R6	77	(China) Jia Yifeng	2
(Thailand) TNP Motorsport	Yamaha	YZF-R6	63	(Thailand) Tosak Nuansai	6
2024 AP250 Entry List
Team	Constructor	Motorcycle	No.	Rider	Rounds
Idemitsu Honda Racing India	Honda	CBR250RR	11	(India) KS Quintal	All
Idemitsu Honda Racing India	Honda	CBR250RR	17	(India) Mohsin Paramban	All
(Japan) SANWA Racing Team	Honda	CBR250RR	12	(Japan) Ryota Ogiwara	3
(Malaysia) SCK Honda Racing Team	Honda	CBR250RR	16	(Indonesia) Irfan Ardiansyah	4
(Malaysia) SCK Honda Racing Team	Honda	CBR250RR	31	(Indonesia) Gerry Salim	5
Honda Racing Vietnam Team	Honda	CBR250RR	18	(Vietnam) Nguyễn Hữu Trí	All
Honda Racing Vietnam Team	Honda	CBR250RR	19	(Vietnam) Nguyễn Tôn Anh Phú	All
Honda Racing Vietnam Team	Honda	CBR250RR	65	(Vietnam) Cao Việt Nam	All
(Thailand) EEST NJT Racing Team 2024	Honda	CBR250RR	25	(Thailand) Watcharin Tubtimon	All
(Thailand) EEST NJT Racing Team 2024	Honda	CBR250RR	27	(Thailand) Warit Thongnoppakun	All
(Thailand) EEST NJT Racing Team 2024	Honda	CBR250RR	117	(Thailand) Pacharagorn Thonggerdloung	1
(Thailand) EEST NJT Racing Team 2024	Honda	CBR250RR	188	(Thailand) Piyawat Patoomyos	1–5
(Thailand) EEST NJT Racing Team 2024	Honda	CBR250RR	111	(Thailand) Kitsada Tanachot	6
(Malaysia) Idemitsu Boon Siew Honda Racing Team	Honda	CBR250RR	41	(Malaysia) Irfan Haykal	All
(Malaysia) Idemitsu Boon Siew Honda Racing Team	Honda	CBR250RR	63	(Malaysia) Syarifuddin Azman	All
(Indonesia) MsGlowForMen Racing Team	Honda	CBR250RR	26	(Indonesia) Rama Putra	4
(Indonesia) Astra Honda Racing Team	Honda	CBR250RR	46	(Indonesia) Herjun Atna Firdaus	All
(Indonesia) Astra Honda Racing Team	Honda	CBR250RR	212	(Indonesia) Kiandra Ramadhipa	All
(Philippines) SDG Team HARC-PRO Honda Ph.	Honda	CBR250RR	51	(Philippines) Alfonsi Rei Santos Daquigan	1–4
(Philippines) SDG Team HARC-PRO Honda Ph.	Honda	CBR250RR	32	(Philippines) Jakob Sablaya	5-6
Gusto Racing India	Honda	CBR250RR	23	(India) Alwin Xavier	5
Gusto Racing India	Yamaha	YZF-R3	13	(India) Johann Reeves Emmanuel	6
(Malaysia) Victor Racing	Yamaha	YZF-R3	15	(Hong Kong) Tse Leong Nang	All
(Malaysia) Victor Racing	Yamaha	YZF-R3	64	(Japan) Yuta Date	3
(Malaysia) Victor Racing	Yamaha	YZF-R3	461	(China) Wang Jiadong	All
Yamaha Racing Indonesia	Yamaha	YZF-R3	36	(Indonesia) Faerozi Toreqottullah	1–2, 4–6
Yamaha Racing Indonesia	Yamaha	YZF-R3	38	(Indonesia) Arai Agaska	All
Yamaha Racing Indonesia	Yamaha	YZF-R3	88	(Indonesia) Candra Hermawan	4–5
(China) T.Y. Antares Racing Team	Yamaha	YZF-R3	40	(China) Zhang Shuncheng	All
(China) T.Y. Antares Racing Team	Yamaha	YZF-R3	99	(Brazil) Humberto Maier	6
(Indonesia) Yamaha BAF Yamalube Akai Jaya MBKW2 Racing	Yamaha	YZF-R3	56	(Indonesia) Galang Hendra Pratama	4
(Japan) Team TEC2 & MOTOTEC-R4 & YSS	Yamaha	YZF-R3	62	(Japan) Ryuji Yokoe	3
(Thailand) One For All	Yamaha	YZF-R3	73	(China) Gao Zi'ang	All
(China) SUBO Racing Team	Yamaha	YZF-R3	95	(China) Ni Tian	2
(China) BOVITEKENG Racing	Yamaha	YZF-R3	118	(China) Hu Tongming	2
(Indonesia) YAMAHA YAMALUBE RRS	Yamaha	YZF-R3	222	(Indonesia) Reynaldo Ratukore	4
(China) Shi Zhuo Racing Team	Yamaha	YZF-R3	369	(China) Jiang Zhuoran	2
(China) Shi Zhuo Racing Team	Yamaha	YZF-R3	911	(China) Jia Rui	2
(Singapore) Team ACR	Yamaha	YZF-R3	68	(Singapore) Jazil Juraimi	5
(Thailand) Yamaha Vit Chonburi	Yamaha	YZF-R3	39	(Thailand) Peerapong Boonlert	6
(Malaysia) Pitsbike Oneway JRT Tech2 Racing Team	Yamaha	YZF-R3	71	(Malaysia) Emil Idzhar	5–6
(Malaysia) Pitsbike Oneway JRT Tech2 Racing Team	Yamaha	YZF-R25	14	(Philippines) Vrei-Ar Marcosuba	1–4
(Indonesia) Motul Sniper Manual Tech	Kawasaki	ZX-25R	21	(Indonesia) Diandra Trihardika	All
(Indonesia) Motul Sniper Manual Tech	Kawasaki	ZX-25R	37	(Japan) Aiki Iyoshi	All
2024 UB150 Entry List
Team	Constructor	Motorcycle	No.	Rider	Rounds
(Malaysia) SCK Honda Racing Team	Honda	Honda RSX150 R	32	(Indonesia) Reykat Yusuf Fadilah	All
(Malaysia) SCK Honda Racing Team	Honda	Honda RSX150 R	63	(Malaysia) Amirul Musa	2–3
(Malaysia) SCK Honda Racing Team	Honda	Honda RSX150 R	96	(Indonesia) Hafidz Fahril Rasyadan	1, 4–6
(Malaysia) Honda Estremo Yuzy Racing	Honda	Honda RSX150 R	61	(Malaysia) Shahrol Syazras	5
(Indonesia) Racetech Sixty Racing Team	Yamaha	Yamaha MX King 150	42	(Indonesia) Hafid Pratamaditya Nursandi	4
(Indonesia) Racetech Sixty Racing Team	Yamaha	Yamaha MX King 150	60	(Indonesia) Wahyu Aji Trilaksana	All
(Indonesia) Racetech Sixty Racing Team	Yamaha	Yamaha MX King 150	177	(Indonesia) Aditya Fauzi	All
(Indonesia) MERAK RACETECH Racing Team	Yamaha	Yamaha MX King 150	53	(Indonesia) Rizal Feriyadi	4
(Indonesia) Yamaha Yamalube ZIEAR LFN HP969 RBT34 ARL The Strokes55	Yamaha	Yamaha MX King 150	69	(Indonesia) Aldiaz Aqsal Ismaya	4
(Indonesia) GG Galak Galak x GDT Racing Team	Yamaha	Yamaha MX King 150	70	(Indonesia) Syirat Syauqi	4
Yamaha LFN HP969 Indonesia Racing Team	Yamaha	Yamaha MX King 150	127	(Indonesia) Riky Ibrahim	4
Yamaha LFN HP969 Indonesia Racing Team	Yamaha	Yamaha MX King 150	143	(Indonesia) Husni Fuadzy	1, 4
Yamaha LFN HP969 Indonesia Racing Team	Yamaha	Yamaha MX King 150	157	(Indonesia) Murobbil Vittoni	All
Yamaha LFN HP969 Indonesia Racing Team	Yamaha	Yamaha MX King 150	222	(Indonesia) Fahmi Basam	All
Yamaha LFN HP969 Indonesia Racing Team	Yamaha	Yamaha MX King 150	306	(Indonesia) Felix Putra Mulya	2
Yamaha LFN HP969 Indonesia Racing Team	Yamaha	Yamaha MX King 150	143	(Indonesia) Husni Fuadzy	5–6
(Indonesia) JPNW RACETECH Racing Team	Yamaha	Yamaha MX King 150	178	(Indonesia) Kiki Sudarman	4
(Philippines) G-Ren Koby Motor Oil Racing	Yamaha	Yamaha Sniper 150	17	(Philippines) Masato Fernando	All
(Philippines) 4S1M EVO Yamaha Racing Team	Yamaha	Yamaha Sniper 150	22	(Philippines) John Emerson Inguito	All
(Philippines) 4S1M EVO Yamaha Racing Team	Yamaha	Yamaha Sniper 150	23	(Indonesia) Gupita Kresna Wardhana	All
UMA Racing MMR Yamaha Philippines	Yamaha	Yamaha Sniper 150	18	(Malaysia) Aliff Danial	3–4
UMA Racing MMR Yamaha Philippines	Yamaha	Yamaha Sniper 150	27	(Philippines) Gian Carlo Mauricio	All
UMA Racing MMR Yamaha Philippines	Yamaha	Yamaha Sniper 150	43	(Philippines) April King Mascardo	1–2
UMA Racing MMR Yamaha Philippines	Yamaha	Yamaha Sniper 150	81	(Malaysia) Adie Putra	5
UMA Racing MMR Yamaha Philippines	Yamaha	Yamaha Sniper 150	118	(Philippines) Joseph Dominique Purino	6
(Malaysia) UMA Racing YAMAHA Maju Motor Asia Team	Yamaha	Yamaha Y15 ZR	1	(Malaysia) Nazirul Izzat	All
(Malaysia) UMA Racing YAMAHA Maju Motor Asia Team	Yamaha	Yamaha Y15 ZR	36	(Malaysia) Syafiq Rosli	1–5
(Malaysia) UMA Racing YAMAHA Maju Motor Asia Team	Yamaha	Yamaha Y15 ZR	88	(Malaysia) Adib Arsyad	6
(Malaysia) Cardinals Factory Racing Team ARRC	Yamaha	Yamaha Y15 ZR	11	(Malaysia) Ahmad Fazrul Sham	All
(Malaysia) Cardinals Factory Racing Team ARRC	Yamaha	Yamaha Y15 ZR	33	(Malaysia) Farres Putra	All
(Malaysia) Pitsbike OneWay JRT Tech2 Racing Team	Yamaha	Yamaha Y15 ZR	13	(Malaysia) Akid Aziz	All
(Malaysia) Pitsbike OneWay JRT Tech2 Racing Team	Yamaha	Yamaha Y15 ZR	50	(Malaysia) Ahmad Afif Amran	All
(Thailand) One For All	Yamaha	Yamaha Y15 ZR	14	(Thailand) Peerapong Luiboonpeng	All
(Thailand) One For All	Yamaha	Yamaha Y15 ZR	202	(Indonesia) Dimas Juli Atmoko	All
(Malaysia) Jetron Yamaha YYPang	Yamaha	Yamaha Y15 ZR	38	(Malaysia) Idil Fitri Mahadi	5
(Malaysia) Yamaha Tekhne AHM Motorsports	Yamaha	Yamaha Y15 ZR	21	(Malaysia) Mohd Iqbal Amri	5
(Thailand) ZYNERGYS Alaimotorsport Aeyservice Asia Team	Yamaha	Yamaha Y15 ZR	299	(Thailand) Suchat Duangjit	6
2024 TVS Asia One Make Championship Entry List
Team	Constructor	Motorcycle	No.	Rider	Rounds
TVS AOM Racing	TVS	TVS Apache RR310	1	(Malaysia) Muzakkir Mohamed	All
TVS AOM Racing	TVS	TVS Apache RR310	2	(Japan) Hiroki Ono	All
TVS AOM Racing	TVS	TVS Apache RR310	3	(Thailand) Vorapong Malahuan	All
TVS AOM Racing	TVS	TVS Apache RR310	4	(Malaysia) Ramdan Rosli	All
TVS AOM Racing	TVS	TVS Apache RR310	5	(Indonesia) Decky Tiarno Aldy	All
TVS AOM Racing	TVS	TVS Apache RR310	6	(India) KY Ahamed	All
TVS AOM Racing	TVS	TVS Apache RR310	7	(India) Jagan Kumar	1, 5
TVS AOM Racing	TVS	TVS Apache RR310	8	(India) Chiranth Vishwanath	All
TVS AOM Racing	TVS	TVS Apache RR310	9	(India) Sarthak Chavan	All
TVS AOM Racing	TVS	TVS Apache RR310	10	(Japan) Riichi Takahira	1–5
TVS AOM Racing	TVS	TVS Apache RR310	11	(Thailand) Atih Kanghair	All
TVS AOM Racing	TVS	TVS Apache RR310	12	(Singapore) Ervin Ekhsan	All
TVS AOM Racing	TVS	TVS Apache RR310	13	(Philippines) Casey Edward Clamor	1–3, 5–6
TVS AOM Racing	TVS	TVS Apache RR310	14	(South Korea) Kim Min-jae	All
TVS AOM Racing	TVS	TVS Apache RR310	15	(Germany) Rocco Sessler	All
TVS AOM Racing	TVS	TVS Apache RR310	16	(China) Zhang Xuhao	2
TVS AOM Racing	TVS	TVS Apache RR310	17	(Japan) Zen Mitani	3
TVS AOM Racing	TVS	TVS Apache RR310	18	(Indonesia) Syahrul Amin	4
TVS AOM Racing	TVS	TVS Apache RR310	19	(Thailand) Kantapat Yabkanthai	6
TVS AOM Racing	TVS	TVS Apache RR310	20	(India) Senthikumar Chandrasekaran	6

All teams use series-specified Dunlop tyres.

== Championship standings ==
Points

Position	**1st**	**2nd**	**3rd**	**4th**	**5th**	**6th**	**7th**	**8th**	**9th**	**10th**	**11th**	**12th**	**13th**	**14th**	**15th**
Points	25	20	16	13	11	10	9	8	7	6	5	4	3	2	1

=== Riders standings ===
==== Asia Superbike 1000 ====
Pos.	Rider	Bike	CHA (Thailand)		ZHU (China)		MOT (Japan)		MAN (Indonesia)		SEP (Malaysia)		CHA (Thailand)		Pts
Pos.	Rider	Bike	R1	R2	R1	R2	R1	R2	R1	R2	R1	R2	R1	R2	Pts
1	(Japan) Yuki Kunii	Honda	4	4	4	C	**DNS**	**1**	2	8	1	1	3	1	183
2	(Indonesia) Andi Farid Izdihar	Honda	2	1	2	C	Ret	6	1	3	4	5	**1**	**3**	181
3	(Malaysia) Hafizh Syahrin	Ducati	Ret	2	**1**	**C**	3	2	7	2	**5**	**3**	5	10	154
4	(Thailand) Nakarin Atiratphuvapat	Honda	**5**	**3**	5	C	2	3	5	9	3	2	4	8	149
5	(Malaysia) Azlan Shah	BMW	1	5	2	C	5	4	10	DNS	2	4	Ret	5	126
6	(Malaysia) Zaqhwan Zaidi	Honda	3	6			6	5	8	4	5	6	2	4	121
7	(Japan) Soichiro Minamimoto	Yamaha	7	8	8	C	4	7	**4**	**1**	7	8	8	6	120
8	(Malaysia) Kasma Daniel	Yamaha	9	10	10	C	9	9	9	7	7	7	7	7	85
9	(Japan) Sho Nishimura	BMW			7	C	1	Ret	6	5	8	9	10	9	83
10	(Australia) Lachlan Epis	BMW	8	9	6	C	8	8	3	6			9	Ret	74
11	(Yemen) Osama Mareai	Yamaha	Ret	12	12	C	11	DNS	11	10	10	12	12	13	41
12	(Malaysia) Teo Yew Joe	BMW	10	13	13	C	13	12	13	12	11	13			34
13	(Japan) Tetsuta Nagashima	Honda											6	2	30
14	(Thailand) Passawit Thitivararak	Honda	Ret	11	9	C	7	DNS							21
15	(Germany) Markus Reiterberger	BMW	6	7											19
16	(Malaysia) Ibrahim Norrodin	Ducati									9	10			13
17	(Japan) Shota Yokoyama	Yamaha					10	10							12
18	(Chinese Taipei) Chiang Chih-ying	Yamaha					12	11			Ret	DNS	Ret	14	11
19	(Japan) Akito Haga	BMW											11	11	10
20	(Indonesia) Eric Saputra	Yamaha							12	11					9
21	(China) Chen Hongyan	BMW			11	C									5
22	(Japan) Kosuke Sakumoto	Honda									Ret	11			5
23	(Thailand) Natetan Thongkoat	Yamaha											Ret	12	4

Colour	Result
Gold	Winner
Silver	Second place
Bronze	Third place
Green	Points classification
Blue	Non-points classification
Blue	Non-classified finish (NC)
Purple	Retired, not classified (Ret)
Red	Did not qualify (DNQ)
Red	Did not pre-qualify (DNPQ)
Black	Disqualified (DSQ)
White	Did not start (DNS)
White	Withdrew (WD)
White	Race cancelled (C)
Blank	Did not practice (DNP)
Blank	Did not arrive (DNA)
Blank	Excluded (EX)

**Bold** – Pole position
Italics – Fastest lap

==== Supersport 600 ====
Pos.	Rider	Bike	CHA (Thailand)		ZHU (China)		MOT (Japan)		MAN (Indonesia)		SEP (Malaysia)		CHA (Thailand)		Pts
Pos.	Rider	Bike	R1	R2	R1	R2	R1	R2	R1	R2	R1	R2	R1	R2	Pts
1	(Thailand) Apiwat Wongthananon	Yamaha	1	1	2	C	1	2	7	Ret	**2**	**5**	1	1	205
2	(Indonesia) Adenanta Putra	Honda	3	2	**4**	**C**	3	4	4	1	11	2	2	Ret	161
3	(Malaysia) Azroy Anuar	Honda	Ret	Ret	1	C	**5**	**3**	1	9	4	1	4	6	145
4	(Malaysia) Helmi Azman	Honda	**2**	**Ret**	3	C	4	5	2	Ret	1	8	3	4	142
5	(Thailand) Kiattisak Singhapong	Honda	7	5	8	C	6	6	6	3	3	7	6	3	125
6	(Indonesia) Veda Ega Pratama	Honda	8	6			8	Ret	**3**	**2**	5	3	9	Ret	96
7	(Philippines) Mckinley Kyle Paz	Yamaha	9	3	7	C	11	Ret	12	7	6	4	5	5	95
8	(Thailand) Thanat Laoongplio	Honda	5	4	5	C	Ret	7	8	10	Ret	6	**12**	**2**	92
9	(Indonesia) Rheza Danica Ahrens	Honda	6	7	6	C	7	8	5	5	9	Ret	Ret	8	85
10	(Indonesia) Wahyu Nugroho	Yamaha	4	Ret	9	C	9	10	9	6	9	10	10	10	75
11	(Japan) Kengo Nagao	Yamaha					2	1	11	8	8	9			73
12	(China) Sha Juntong	Yamaha	11	9	10	C	13	12	13	11	10	11	13	12	51
13	(Japan) Rei Matsuoka	Yamaha	10	8			10	9							27
14	(Indonesia) Fadillah Arbi Aditama	Honda							10	4					19
15	(Thailand) Ratthapong Wilairot	Yamaha											7	7	18
16	(Japan) Yuta Date	Yamaha											8	9	15
17	(Thailand) Tosak Nuansai	Yamaha											11	11	10
18	(Japan) Shinya Mikami	Yamaha					12	14							6
19	(China) Jia Yifeng	Yamaha			11	C									5
20	(China) Zhou Fenglong	Kawasaki			12	C									4
21	(Indonesia) Dimas Ekky Pratama	Honda							Ret	Ret					0
	(Indonesia) Andy Muhammad Fadly	Yamaha													0

Colour	Result
Gold	Winner
Silver	Second place
Bronze	Third place
Green	Points classification
Blue	Non-points classification
Blue	Non-classified finish (NC)
Purple	Retired, not classified (Ret)
Red	Did not qualify (DNQ)
Red	Did not pre-qualify (DNPQ)
Black	Disqualified (DSQ)
White	Did not start (DNS)
White	Withdrew (WD)
White	Race cancelled (C)
Blank	Did not practice (DNP)
Blank	Did not arrive (DNA)
Blank	Excluded (EX)

**Bold** – Pole position
Italics – Fastest lap

==== Asia Production 250 ====
Pos.	Rider	Bike	CHA (Thailand)		ZHU (China)		MOT (Japan)		MAN (Indonesia)		SEP (Malaysia)		CHA (Thailand)		Pts
Pos.	Rider	Bike	R1	R2	R1	R2	R1	R2	R1	R2	R1	R2	R1	R2	Pts
1	(Indonesia) Herjun Atna Firdaus	Honda	3	1	3	C	2	Ret	7	8	1	**4**	4	2	165
2	(Indonesia) Faerozi Toreqottullah	Yamaha	**1**	**7**	2	C			3	1	21	1	**3**	**3**	152
3	(Indonesia) Kiandra Ramadhipa	Honda	5	6	6	C	**1**	**1**	6	2	**5**	DNS	1	Ret	147
4	(Indonesia) Arai Agaska	Yamaha	2	5	**Ret**	**C**	3	4	4	3	WD	WD	2	4	122
5	(Japan) Aiki Iyoshi	Kawasaki	Ret	2	5	C	Ret	5	9	7	2	2	6	5	119
6	(Malaysia) Syarifuddin Azman	Honda	4	3	4	C	5	6	8	11	3	8	8	7	117
7	(Vietnam) Cao Việt Nam	Honda	11	11	1	C	Ret	DNS	2	10	20	3	Ret	1	102
8	(Thailand) Warit Thongnoppakun	Honda	6	8	10	C	4	9	11	14	8	11	13	12	71
9	(Malaysia) Irfan Haykal	Honda	20	Ret	7	C	Ret	10	**Ret**	**13**	4	9	7	8	55
10	(Thailand) Piyawat Patoomyos	Honda	12	4	13	C	8	8	13	15	13	18			43
11	(Vietnam) Nguyễn Hữu Trí	Honda	10	14	14	C	12	11	17	16	7	12	12	11	41
12	(Vietnam) Nguyễn Tôn Anh Phú	Honda	9	10	18	C	9	7	Ret	22	WD	WD	11	10	40
13	(Indonesia) Reynaldo Ratukore	Yamaha							1	4					38
14	(Thailand) Watcharin Tubtimon	Honda	7	Ret	9	C	15	16	18	17	14	10	9	18	32
15	(Indonesia) Candra Hermawan	Yamaha							5	6	Ret	6			31
16	(Japan) Ryota Ogiwara	Honda					6	2							30
17	(Philippines) Alfonsi Rei Santos Daquigan	Honda	8	9	12	C	10	Ret	15	Ret					26
18	(Thailand) Kitsada Tanachot	Honda											5	6	21
19	(Indonesia) Diandra Trihardika	Kawasaki	EX	17	15	C	Ret	12	12	12	12	13	Ret	19	20
20	(Indonesia) Gerry Salim	Honda									6	7			19
21	(Malaysia) Emil Idzihar Ezuan	Yamaha									9	5	Ret	15	19
22	(China) Gao Zi'ang	Yamaha	15	15	17	C	11	13	Ret	20	10	14	19	21	18
23	(Indonesia) Irfan Ardiansyah	Honda							10	5					17
24	(Japan) Yuta Date	Yamaha					Ret	3							16
25	(Brazil) Humberto Maier	Yamaha											10	9	13
26	(India) KS Quintal	Honda	EX	13	11	C	14	Ret	19	18	15	16	17	17	11
27	(Indonesia) Galang Hendra Pratama	Yamaha							14	9					9
28	(Japan) Ryuji Yokoe	Yamaha					7	Ret							9
29	(China) Jiang Zhuoran	Yamaha			8	C									8
30	(Thailand) Pacharagorn Thonggerdloung	Honda	13	12											7
31	(Singapore) Jazil Huraimi	Yamaha									11	17			5
32	(China) Wang Jiadong	Yamaha	18	19	19	C	13	14	20	21	16	19	16	16	5
33	(Philippines) Jakob Sablaya	Honda									18	22	14	14	4
34	(India) Johann Emmanuel	Yamaha											15	13	4
35	(India) Mohsin Paramban	Honda	14	16	20	C	17	17	22	23	19	23	20	22	2
36	(Philippines) Vrei-Ar Marcosuba	Yamaha	19	Ret	21	C	16	15	21	Ret					1
37	(India) Allwin Xavier	Honda									Ret	15			1
38	(China) Zhang Shuncheng	Yamaha	16	18	Ret	C	18	DNS	24	24	17	20	18	20	0
39	(Indonesia) Rama Putra	Yamaha							16	19					0
40	(China) Ni Tian	Yamaha			16	C									0
41	(Hong Kong) Tse Leong Nang	Yamaha	17	20	23	C	Ret	18	23	25	Ret	21	21	Ret	0
42	(China) Hu Tongming	Yamaha			22	C									0
43	(China) Jia Rui	Yamaha			Ret	C									0
44	(Thailand) Peerapong Boonlert	Yamaha											Ret	Ret	0

Colour	Result
Gold	Winner
Silver	Second place
Bronze	Third place
Green	Points classification
Blue	Non-points classification
Blue	Non-classified finish (NC)
Purple	Retired, not classified (Ret)
Red	Did not qualify (DNQ)
Red	Did not pre-qualify (DNPQ)
Black	Disqualified (DSQ)
White	Did not start (DNS)
White	Withdrew (WD)
White	Race cancelled (C)
Blank	Did not practice (DNP)
Blank	Did not arrive (DNA)
Blank	Excluded (EX)

**Bold** – Pole position
Italics – Fastest lap

==== Underbone 150 ====
Pos.	Rider	Bike	CHA (Thailand)		ZHU (China)		MOT (Japan)		MAN (Indonesia)		SEP (Malaysia)		CHA (Thailand)		Pts
Pos.	Rider	Bike	R1	R2	R1	R2	R1	R2	R1	R2	R1	R2	R1	R2	Pts
1	(Indonesia) Fahmi Basam	Yamaha	1	16	9	C	4	Ret	1	7	1	6	13	1	142
2	(Malaysia) Akid Aziz	Yamaha	Ret	4	**3**	**C**	7	1	2	1	17	9	4	13	131
3	(Indonesia) Aditya Fauzi	Yamaha	**4**	**10**	4	C	**11**	**2**	4	4	16	2	2	14	125
4	(Indonesia) Murobbil Vittoni	Yamaha	7	3	5	C	5	14	Ret	3	**Ret**	**7**	**1**	**2**	119
5	(Indonesia) Gupita Kresna	Yamaha	Ret	Ret	2	C	1	Ret	5	17	2	8	6	6	104
6	(Malaysia) Nazirrul Izzat	Yamaha	5	2	6	C	2	3	DNS	DNS	13	3	Ret	Ret	96
7	(Indonesia) Husni Fuadzy	Yamaha	Ret	15					6	2	4	5	3	11	76
8	(Malaysia) Ahmad Fazrul Sham	Yamaha	12	12	12	C	3	8	Ret	15	14	1	12	12	72
9	(Indonesia) Wahyu Aji Trilaksana	Yamaha	2	6	Ret	C	Ret	11	10	10	20	13	5	8	69
10	(Philippines) John Emerson Inguito	Yamaha	Ret	7	7	C	Ret	Ret	11	5	9	11	7	5	66
11	(Philippines) Gian Carlo Mauricio	Yamaha	Ret	13	1	C	10	13	18	11	7	18	11	Ret	56
12	(Malaysia) Ahmad Afif Amran	Yamaha	13	1	Ret	C	13	6	Ret	DNS	18	DNS	14	4	56
13	(Thailand) Peerapong Luiboonpeng	Yamaha	8	5	10	C	Ret	5	Ret	16	5	16	Ret	9	54
14	(Indonesia) Reykat Yusuf Fadilah	Honda	10	11	15	C	12	10	16	9	12	14	8	7	52
15	(Indonesia) Dimas Juli Atmoko	Yamaha	6	17	17	C	9	Ret	20	14	6	17	9	3	52
16	(Malaysia) Syafiq Rosli	Yamaha	Ret	9	13	C	8	9	8	8	19	Ret			41
17	(Malaysia) Farres Putra	Yamaha	9	14	18	C	6	12	**19**	**12**	10	15	10	Ret	40
18	(Philippines) Masato Fernando	Yamaha	EX	Ret	14	C	15	7	12	19	8	4	Ret	Ret	37
19	(Philippines) April King Mascardo	Yamaha	3	8	11	C									29
20	(Malaysia) Syahrol Syazras	Honda									3	12			20
21	(Indonesia) Syirat Syauqi	Yamaha							9	6					17
22	(Indonesia) Riky Ibrahim	Yamaha							3	Ret					16
23	(Malaysia) Aliff Danial	Yamaha					14	4	17	Ret					15
24	(Indonesia) Hafidz Fahril Rasyadan	Honda	11	18					14	18	15	19	Ret	10	14
25	(Indonesia) Aldiaz Aqsal Ismaya	Yamaha							7	22					9
26	(Indonesia) Felix Putra Mulya	Yamaha			8	C									8
27	(Malaysia) Adie Putra Sukarno	Yamaha									Ret	10			6
28	(Malaysia) Idil Fitri Mahadi	Yamaha									11	Ret			5
29	(Indonesia) Hafid Pratamaditya	Yamaha							15	13					4
30	(Indonesia) Kiki Sudarman	Yamaha							13	20					3
31	(Malaysia) Amirul Ariff Musa	Honda			16	C	DNS	15							1
32	(Thailand) Suchat Duangjit	Yamaha											Ret	15	1
33	(Malaysia) Iqbal Amri Malek	Yamaha									Ret	DNS			0
34	(Indonesia) Rizal Feriyadi	Yamaha							Ret	21					0
35	(Malaysia) Adib Arsyad	Yamaha											Ret	Ret	0
36	(Philippines) Joseph Dominique	Yamaha											Ret	DNS	0

Colour	Result
Gold	Winner
Silver	Second place
Bronze	Third place
Green	Points classification
Blue	Non-points classification
Blue	Non-classified finish (NC)
Purple	Retired, not classified (Ret)
Red	Did not qualify (DNQ)
Red	Did not pre-qualify (DNPQ)
Black	Disqualified (DSQ)
White	Did not start (DNS)
White	Withdrew (WD)
White	Race cancelled (C)
Blank	Did not practice (DNP)
Blank	Did not arrive (DNA)
Blank	Excluded (EX)

**Bold** – Pole position
Italics – Fastest lap

==== TVS Asia One Make Championship ====
Pos.	Rider	Bike	CHA (Thailand)		ZHU (China)		MOT (Japan)		MAN (Indonesia)		SEP (Malaysia)		CHA (Thailand)		Pts
Pos.	Rider	Bike	R1	R2	R1	R2	R1	R2	R1	R2	R1	R2	R1	R2	Pts
1	(Japan) Hiroki Ono	TVS	**1**	**1**	**1**	C	1	1	1	2	1	10	1	1	251
2	(Malaysia) Ramdan Rosli	TVS	2	5	2	C	3	3	2	1	**3**	**Ret**	**4**	**4**	170
3	(India) Sarthak Chavan	TVS	3	2	12	C	6	Ret	3	3	Ret	3	2	7	127
4	(Thailand) Vorapong Malahuan	TVS	8	7	5	C	4	Ret	6	5	5	2	6	3	119
5	(Germany) Rocco Sessler	TVS	9	Ret	Ret	C	7	6	7	6	2	1	7	6	109
6	(India) Chiranth Vishwanath	TVS	10	8	8	C	10	5	4	9	4	6	5	8	101
7	(Indonesia) Decky Tiarno Aldy	TVS	4	6	7	C	9	7	9	7	7	5	9	9	98
8	(Thailand) Atih Kanghar	TVS	6	4	6	C	5	Ret	10	8	Ret	Ret	3	2	94
9	(Malaysia) Muzakkir Mohamed	TVS	5	3	4	C	Ret	DNS	8	Ret	6	4	14	5	84
10	(Japan) Riichi Takahira	TVS	7	Ret	3	C	Ret	4	**5**	**4**	DNS	DNS			62
11	(South Korea) Kim Min-jae	TVS	14	12	9	C	8	8	11	11	Ret	8	12	13	54
12	(India) KY Ahamed	TVS	12	9	Ret	C	12	Ret	12	10	Ret	7	10	11	45
13	(Philippines) Casey Edward Clamor	TVS	13	10	10	C	11	9			8	Ret	11	12	44
14	(Japan) Zen Mitani	TVS					**2**	**2**							40
15	(Singapore) Ervin Ekhsan	TVS	Ret	Ret	DNS	C	13	10	Ret	13	Ret	9	13	14	24
16	(Thailand) Kantapat Yabkanthai	TVS											8	10	14
17	(India) Jagan Kumar	TVS	11	11							WD	WD			10
18	(Indonesia) Syahrul Amin	TVS							13	12					7
19	(China) Zhang Xuhao	TVS			11	C									5
20	(India) Senthikumar Chandrasekaran	TVS											WD	WD	

Colour	Result
Gold	Winner
Silver	Second place
Bronze	Third place
Green	Points classification
Blue	Non-points classification
Blue	Non-classified finish (NC)
Purple	Retired, not classified (Ret)
Red	Did not qualify (DNQ)
Red	Did not pre-qualify (DNPQ)
Black	Disqualified (DSQ)
White	Did not start (DNS)
White	Withdrew (WD)
White	Race cancelled (C)
Blank	Did not practice (DNP)
Blank	Did not arrive (DNA)
Blank	Excluded (EX)

**Bold** – Pole position
Italics – Fastest lap
