= Zen Mitani =

Japanese motorcycle racer (born 2007)

Zen Mitani 三谷 然
- Mitani at the 2026 Czech Grand Prix
- Born: 27 March 2007 (age 19); Sakuragawa, Ibaraki, Japan
- Nationality: Japanese
- Current team: Honda Team Asia
- Bike number: 32
Statistics
Moto3 World Championship
Active years	2025–
Championships	0
Manufacturer	Honda
Last season (2025)	38th (0 pts)
Starts / Wins / Podiums / Poles / F. laps / Points; 20 / 0 / 0 / 0 / 0 / 6
All Japan J-GP3
Active years	2022–2024
Championships	0
Manufacturer	Honda
Best season (2022)	10th (32 pts)
Starts / Wins / Podiums / Poles / F. laps / Points; 9 / 0 / 0 / 0 / 1 / 66

Zen Mitani (Japanese: 三谷 然, Hepburn: Mitani Zen; born 27 March 2007) is a Japanese Grand Prix motorcycle racer who competes in the Moto3 World Championship for Honda Team Asia.

Mitani won the 2024 Asia Talent Cup. He made his Grand Prix debut at the 2025 Indonesian motorcycle Grand Prix, acting as a replacement rider.

== Career ==
=== Early career ===
Mitani was born in Iwase in Sakuragawa, Japan. He rode a motorbike for the first time at the age of three. After performing well in national junior categories, finishing runner-up in the Tsukuba Road Race Championship's J-GP3 class in 2021, and later tenth in the 2022 All Japan Road Race Championship—he was selected to compete in the 2023 Asia Talent Cup at the age of 15. Mitani completed his first Cup season with six podium finishes, placing fifth in the final standings.

In his second Asia Talent Cup season in 2024, Mitani won seven of the twelve total races on the calendar, and finished on the podium in all but two. This would crown him champion with still one more round to go. He also participated in the TVS class of the 2024 Asia Road Racing Championship as a wildcard entry at the Motegi round, where he set pole position and finished both races in second place, behind Hiroki Ono.

After his successful stint in the Asia Talent Cup, Mitani was promoted to both the Red Bull MotoGP Rookies Cup and FIM JuniorGP World Championship for the 2025 season. He started his Rookies Cup spell with consistent results, building momentum and climbing the order as the rest of the season unfolded, clinching two podium finishes in total, with a second place at Sachsenring and a third place in Race 1 of the final round at Misano, barely missing out on a third podium in Race 2.

=== Moto3 World Championship ===
==== Rivacold Snipers Team (2025) ====
On 2 October 2025, Rivacold Snipers Team announced Mitani would be making his Grand Prix debut at the 2025 Indonesian motorcycle Grand Prix, acting as a replacement rider for injured Nicola Carraro. On Saturday, Mitani qualified 24th and, despite running as high as 17th during the Sunday race, he crashed out on lap 11 and retired.

==== Honda Team Asia (2025–) ====
One month after making his Grand Prix debut, Mitani was announced to make his full-time debut in the 2026 Moto3 World Championship with Honda Team Asia, alongside Veda Pratama. Ahead of the 2025 Portuguese Grand Prix, Honda Team Asia announced Mitani would race in the final two rounds of the 2025 season, effectively making an early debut with the team as he replaced the injured Tatchakorn Buasri.

== Career statistics ==
=== Tsukuba Road Race Championship ===
==== Races by year ====
(key) (Races in bold indicate pole position; races in italics indicate fastest lap. Superscript numbers indicate overall results, including both national and international classes.)

Year	Class	Bike	1	2	3	4	Pos	Pts
2020	J-GP3 (Note: National class.)	Honda	TSU1; 4^{9}	TSU2; C	TSU3; Ret	TSU4; C	7th	13
2021	J-GP3	Honda	TSU1; 3^{5}	TSU2; 5^{5}	TSU3; 2^{2}	TSU4; 2^{2}	2nd	67

=== All Japan Road Race Championship ===
==== Races by year ====
(key) (Races in bold indicate pole position; races in italics indicate fastest lap)

Year	Class	Bike	1	2	3	4	5	6	Pos	Pts
2022	J-GP3	Honda	MOT; 15	SUG; 8	TSU; 10	AUT; 8	OKA; 7	SUZ	10th	32
2023	J-GP3	Honda	MOT; 13	SUG; 7	TSU	AUT	OKA	SUZ	18th	12
2024	J-GP3	Honda	MOT	SUG; 4	TSU; 7	AUT	OKA	SUZ	13th	22

=== Asia Talent Cup ===
==== Races by year ====
(key) (Races in bold indicate pole position, races in italics indicate fastest lap)

Year	Bike	1		2		3		4		5		6		Pos	Pts
Year	Bike	R1	R2	R1	R2	R1	R2	R1	R2	R1	R2	R1	R2	Pos	Pts
2023	Honda	MAL; 3	MAL; 3	JPN; 2	JPN; Ret	INA; 3	INA; 2	THA; 4	THA; Ret	SEP; Ret	SEP; 2	QAT; 6	QAT; 6	5th	141
2024	Honda	**QAT**; 1	QAT; 2	**MAL**; 1	MAL; 1	INA; 1	INA; 2	**JPN**; 1	JPN; 2	THA; 5	THA; 4	**SEP**; 1	SEP; 1	1st	259

=== ARRC TVS Asia One Make Championship ===
==== Races by year ====
(key) (Races in bold indicate pole position; races in italics indicate fastest lap)

Year	Bike	1		2		3		4		5		6		Pos	Pts
Year	Bike	R1	R2	R1	R2	R1	R2	R1	R2	R1	R2	R1	R2	Pos	Pts
2024	TVS	BUR	BUR	ZHU	ZHU	**MOT**; 2	**MOT**; 2	MAN	MAN	SEP	SEP	BUR	BUR	14th	40

=== FIM JuniorGP World Championship ===
==== Races by year ====
(key) (Races in bold indicate pole position; races in italics indicate fastest lap)

Year	Bike	1	2	3	4	5	6	7	8	9	10	11	12	Pos	Pts
2024	Honda	MIS1; 17	MIS2; 18	EST	CAT1	CAT2	ALG1	ALG2	JER1	JER2	ARA	EST1	EST2	34th	0
2025	Honda	EST; 8	JER1; 14	JER2; 11	MAG; 9	ARA1; 12	ARA2; 9	MIS1; 8	MIS2; 9	CAT1; 7	CAT2; 9	VAL1; 13	VAL2; 16	11th	68

=== Red Bull MotoGP Rookies Cup ===
==== Races by year ====
(key) (Races in bold indicate pole position; races in italics indicate fastest lap)

Year	Bike	1		2		3		4		5		6		7		Pos	Pts
Year	Bike	R1	R2	R1	R2	R1	R2	R1	R2	R1	R2	R1	R2	R1	R2	Pos	Pts
2025	KTM	JER; 7	JER; 19	LMS; 11	LMS; Ret	ARA; 6	ARA; 15	MUG; 8	MUG; 12	SAC; 5	SAC; 2	RBR; Ret	RBR; 9	MIS; 3	MIS; 4	7th	104

=== Grand Prix motorcycle racing ===
==== By season ====
Season	Class	Motorcycle	Team	Race	Win	Podium	Pole	FLap	Pts	Plcd
2025	Moto3	Honda	Rivacold Snipers Team	1	0	0	0	0	0	38th
2025	Moto3	Honda	Honda Team Asia	2	0	0	0	0	0	38th
2026	Moto3	Honda	Honda Team Asia	17	0	0	0	0	6*	23rd*
Total				**20**	**0**	**0**	**0**	**0**	**6**	

==== By class ====
Class	Seasons	1st GP	1st pod	1st win	Race	Win	Podiums	Pole	FLap	Pts
Moto3	2025–present	2025 Indonesia			20	0	0	0	0	6
Total	2025–present				**20**	**0**	**0**	**0**	**0**	**6**

==== Races by year ====
(key) (Races in bold indicate pole position; races in italics indicate fastest lap)

Year	Class	Bike	1	2	3	4	5	6	7	8	9	10	11	12	13	14	15	16	17	18	19	20	21	22	Pos	Pts
2025	Moto3	Honda	THA	ARG	AME	QAT	SPA	FRA	GBR	ARA	ITA	NED	GER	CZE	AUT	HUN	CAT	RSM	JPN	INA; Ret	AUS	MAL	POR; 19	VAL; Ret	38th	0
2026	Moto3	Honda	THA; 22	BRA; 16	USA; Ret	SPA; 21	FRA; 16	CAT; 21	ITA; 22	HUN; 20	CZE; 19	NED; Ret	GER	GBR	ARA; 23	RSM; 22	AUT; 18	JPN; 21	INA; 16	AUS; C	MAL; 13	QAT; 13	POR	VAL	23rd*	6*

* Season still in progress.
