= Ryuji Yokoe =

Japanese motorcycle racer

- Nationality: Japanese
- Born: 18 January 1978 (age 48); Miyagi, Japan
- Current team: SHOP Union Tohoku
- Bike number: 62
Motorcycle racing career statistics
250cc World Championship
Active years	2002, 2005–2006
Manufacturers	Yamaha
Starts / Wins / Podiums / Poles / F. laps / Points; 3 / 0 / 0 / 0 / 0 / 10

Ryuji Yokoe (横江竜司, Yokoe Ryūji; born 18 January 1978) is a Japanese motorcycle racer. He currently competes in the All Japan Road Race ST600 Championship aboard a Yamaha YZF-R6. He won the MFJ All Japan Road Race ST600 Championship in 2015 for the Yamaha Thailand Racing Team aboard a Yamaha YZF-R6. Yokoe has previously competed in the MFJ All Japan Road Race GP125 Championship, the MFJ All Japan Road Race GP250 Championship – where he finished as champion in 2006 – and the MFJ All Japan Road Race JSB1000 Championship.

== Career statistics ==
=== Grand Prix motorcycle racing ===
==== By season ====
Season	Class	Motorcycle	Team	Race	Win	Podium	Pole	FLap	Pts	Plcd
2002	250cc	Yamaha	Morinokumasan Miztec RT	1	0	0	0	0	2	35th
2005	250cc	Yamaha	RT Morinokumasan Sato Jyuku	1	0	0	0	0	0	NC
2006	250cc	Yamaha	RT Morinokumasan Sendai	1	0	0	0	0	8	25th
Total				**3**	**0**	**0**	**0**	**0**	**10**	

==== Races by year ====
(key)

Year	Class	Bike	1	2	3	4	5	6	7	8	9	10	11	12	13	14	15	16	Pos.	Pts
2002	250cc	Yamaha	JPN	RSA	SPA	FRA	ITA	CAT	NED	GBR	GER	CZE	POR	BRA	PAC; 14	MAL	AUS	VAL	35th	2
2005	250cc	Yamaha	SPA	POR	CHN	FRA	ITA	CAT	NED	GBR	GER	CZE	JPN; Ret	MAL	QAT	AUS	TUR	VAL	NC	0
2006	250cc	Yamaha	SPA	QAT	TUR	CHN	FRA	ITA	CAT	NED	GBR	GER	CZE	MAL	AUS	JPN; 8	POR	VAL	25th	8

=== Asia Production 250 ===
==== Races by year ====
(key) (Races in bold indicate pole position; races in italics indicate fastest lap)

Year	Bike	1		2		3		4		5		6		Pos	Pts
Year	Bike	R1	R2	R1	R2	R1	R2	R1	R2	R1	R2	R1	R2	Pos	Pts
2026	Yamaha	SEP	SEP	CHA	CHA	MOT; 24	MOT; 26	MAN	MAN	SEP	SEP	CHA	CHA	42nd*	0*
