= Veda Pratama =

Indonesian motorcycle racer (born 2008)

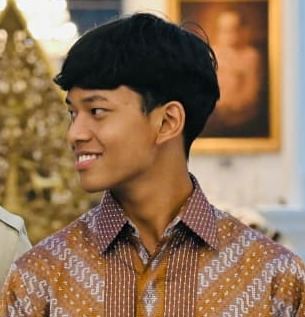
- Veda in 2025
- Nationality: Indonesian
- Born: 23 November 2008 (age 17); Wonosari, Indonesia
- Current team: Honda Team Asia
- Bike number: 9
Motorcycle racing career statistics
Moto3 World Championship
Active years	2026–
Manufacturers	Honda
Starts / Wins / Podiums / Poles / F. laps / Points; 19 / 0 / 2 / 1 / 1 / 144

Veda Ega Pratama (born 23 November 2008) is an Indonesian Grand Prix motorcycle racer who competes in the 2026 Moto3 World Championship with Honda Team Asia. He is the 2023 Asia Talent Cup champion, and the only Indonesian to achieve this feat so far.

Veda has competed in the JuniorGP and Red Bull MotoGP Rookies Cup, where he finished as runner-up.

== Career ==
=== Early career ===
Veda was born in Wonosari, Indonesia. Influenced by his father, who raced in the Supersport 600 National Championship, he began riding minibikes at the age of five. Veda was crowned champion of the Indonesian National Club Underbone Race Championship in 2019, while also competing in the Astra Honda Racing School with bigger bikes and layouts, where he claimed several victories.

=== Asia Talent Cup (2021–2023) ===
Following his national success, aged 12, Veda was selected to compete as a wildcard entry in the Indonesian rounds of the 2021 Asia Talent Cup, which consisted of four races held at Mandalika. He finished in the top-ten in two of the three races he contested, crashing out in one of them. The fourth race was cancelled due to a shortage of track marshals. For 2022, Veda was given a full-time seat in the Asia Talent Cup, where he would clinch six podiums in total, of which three were race victories. His final position in the standings was third.

Veda remained in the Cup for 2023 and took the crown after winning nine out of twelve races, missing the podium on only two occasions.

=== Asia Road Racing Championship (2023–2024) ===
Veda participated in the Asia Production 250 class of the 2023 Asia Road Racing Championship, securing seven podiums and three wins, which put him third in the final standings. He also competed in the 2024 Asia Road Racing Championship, this time in the Supersport 600 class, where he clinched three podiums, including a best result of second place at his home round in Mandalika.

=== Red Bull Rookies Cup and JuniorGP (2024–2025) ===
Veda was promoted to the Red Bull MotoGP Rookies Cup for 2024, after claiming the 2023 Asia Talent Cup title. He had a solid debut season in the series, securing multiple top-ten finishes and a third place at the Red Bull Ring, which placed him in eighth place in the final standings. Following his progress in the Rookies Cup, Veda remained in the series for a second season. He claimed six podiums in total, including three wins, and finished as runner-up in the final standings, despite missing two races at the Le Mans round.

In 2025, Veda also competed in the FIM JuniorGP World Championship with the Astra Honda Racing Team, with Zen Mitani as teammate.

Veda at the 2026 Czech Grand Prix

=== Moto3 World Championship (2026–) ===
==== Honda Team Asia ====
In October 2025, Honda Team Asia announced Veda would be making his Grand Prix debut in the 2026 Moto3 World Championship, alongside Zen Mitani. He placed third in Brazil 2026, becoming the first Indonesian to do so and getting the best result achieved by an Indonesian in a Grand Prix.

At the Australian Grand Prix in October 2026, Veda secured his first career pole position in Moto3, setting a time of 1:35.299 at Phillip Island to beat Máximo Quiles by 0.021 seconds, becoming the first Indonesian rider to take a pole position in Grand Prix motorcycle racing.

== Career statistics ==
=== Asia Talent Cup ===
==== Races by year ====
(key) (Races in bold indicate pole position, races in italics indicate fastest lap)

Year	Bike	1		2		3		4		5		6		Pos	Pts
Year	Bike	R1	R2	R1	R2	R1	R2	R1	R2	R1	R2	R1	R2	Pos	Pts
2021	Honda	QAT	QAT	DOH	DOH	INA; 8	INA; Ret	MAN; 9	MAN; C					17th	15
2022	Honda	QAT; Ret	QAT; 3	INA	INA	JPN; 6	JPN; C	THA; 2	THA; 1	MAL; Ret	MAL; 2	**MAN**; 1	**MAN**; 1	3rd	141
2023	Honda	**MAL**; 2	**MAL**; 1	JPN; 1	JPN; 1	**INA**; 1	INA; 1	THA; 5	THA; 1	SEP; Ret	SEP; 1	**QAT**; 1	**QAT**; 1	1st	256

=== Asia Road Racing Championship ===
==== Races by year ====
(key) (Races in bold indicate pole position; races in italics indicate fastest lap)

Year	Class	Bike	1		2		3		4		5		6		Pos	Pts
Year	Class	Bike	R1	R2	R1	R2	R1	R2	R1	R2	R1	R2	R1	R2	Pos	Pts
2023	AP250	Honda	BUR; 2	BUR; 9	SEP; 3	SEP; 1	SUG; 3	SUG; 3	MAN	MAN	**ZHU**; 6	**ZHU**; 1	**BUR**; 1	**BUR**; Ret	3rd	160
2024	SSP600	Honda	BUR; 8	BUR; 6	ZHU	ZHU	MOT; 8	MOT; Ret	**MAN**; 3	**MAN**; 2	SEP; 5	SEP; 3	BUR; 9	BUR; Ret	6th	96

=== Red Bull MotoGP Rookies Cup ===
==== Races by year ====
(key) (Races in bold indicate pole position; races in italics indicate fastest lap)

Year	Bike	1		2		3		4		5		6		7		Pos	Pts
Year	Bike	R1	R2	R1	R2	R1	R2	R1	R2	R1	R2	R1	R2	R1	R2	Pos	Pts
2024	KTM	JER; Ret	JER; 11	LMS; 10	LMS; 7	MUG; 5	MUG; 8	ASS; 4	ASS; 7	RBR; Ret	RBR; 3	ARA; 7	ARA; 11	MIS; 8	MIS; 4	8th	112
2025	KTM	JER; 3	JER; Ret	LMS	LMS	**ARA**; 4	**ARA**; 4	MUG; 1	MUG; 1	SAC; 4	SAC; 1	**RBR**; 2	**RBR**; 2	MIS; Ret	MIS; 5	2nd	181

=== FIM JuniorGP World Championship ===
==== Races by year ====
(key) (Races in bold indicate pole position; races in italics indicate fastest lap)

Year	Bike	1	2	3	4	5	6	7	8	9	10	11	12	Pos	Pts
2025	Honda	EST; Ret	JER1; 21	JER2; 21	MAG; 12	ARA1; 6	ARA2; 8	MIS1; 4	MIS2; 6	CAT1; 6	CAT2; 8	VAL1; 10	VAL2; Ret	10th	70

=== Grand Prix motorcycle racing ===
==== By season ====
Season	Class	Motorcycle	Team	Race	Win	Podium	Pole	FLap	Pts	Plcd
2026	Moto3	Honda	Honda Team Asia	19	0	2	1	1	144*	6th*
Total				**19**	**0**	**2**	**1**	**1**	**144**	

==== By class ====
Class	Seasons	1st GP	1st pod	1st win	Race	Win	Podiums	Pole	FLap	Pts	WChmp
Moto3	2026–present	2026 Thailand	2026 Brazil		19	0	2	1	1	144	0
Total	2026–present				**19**	**0**	**2**	**1**	**1**	**144**	**0**

==== Races by year ====
(key) (Races in bold indicate pole position; races in italics indicate fastest lap)

Year	Class	Bike	1	2	3	4	5	6	7	8	9	10	11	12	13	14	15	16	17	18	19	20	21	22	Pos	Pts
2026	Moto3	Honda	THA; 5	BRA; 3	USA; Ret	SPA; 6	FRA; 4	CAT; 7	ITA; 8	HUN; 16	CZE; 5	NED; Ret	GER; 8	GBR; 9	ARA; 20	RSM; 18	AUT; 13	JPN; 11	INA; 6	**AUS**; C	MAL; 2	QAT; 4	POR	VAL	6th*	144*

* Season still in progress.
