= Seiryu Ikegami =

Japanese motorcycle racer (born 2008)

Seiryu Ikegami 池上 聖竜
- Born: 20 October 2008 (age 18); Toda, Saitama, Japan
- Nationality: Japanese
- Current team: AGR Team
- Bike number: 74
Statistics
Moto3 Junior World Championship
Active years	2026–
Championships	0
Manufacturer	KTM (2026–)
Starts / Wins / Podiums / Poles / F. laps / Points; 9 / 0 / 0 / 0 / 0 / 2
All Japan ST600
Active years	2026
Championships	0
Manufacturer	Honda
Starts / Wins / Podiums / Poles / F. laps / Points; 2 / 0 / 0 / 0 / 0 / 23
All Japan J-GP3
Active years	2022–2025
Championships	0
Manufacturer	Honda
Team(s)	MotoUp Racing
Starts / Wins / Podiums / Poles / F. laps / Points; 11 / 0 / 2 / 1 / 0 / 22

Seiryu Ikegami (Japanese: 池上 聖竜, Hepburn: Ikegami Seiryū; born 20 October 2008) is a Japanese motorcycle racer who competes in the Moto3 Junior World Championship for AGR Team.

Ikegami is an Asia Talent Cup graduate, where he was runner-up in 2025. He won the FIM MiniGP Japan championship in 2022 and finished in third place in the MiniGP World Series. He is also part of Tetsuta Nagashima's rider development program TN45.

== Career ==
=== Early career ===
Born in Toda, Japan, Ikegami began riding motorcycles at the age of three. He competed in different mini-bike championships such as the Daijiro Cup, NSF100 and Kanto Road Mini Championship, where he won several titles.

=== FIM MiniGP (2022) ===
In 2022, Ikegami joined the newly established FIM MiniGP Japan championship. Following two podiums in the first two rounds, he clinched his maiden win at Motegi, which he converted into a double victory in Race 2. Ikegami again won both races in the next round at Okegawa which moved him up to the championship lead, and ultimately took the crown in the final round at Tsukuba. As Japan's MiniGP champion, Ikegami qualified for the MiniGP World Series final at Valencia, Spain, together with runner-up Haruki Matsuyama. He won the opening race and finished in third place overall after a seventh and fourth in Races 2 and 3, respectively.

=== All Japan Road Race Championship (2022–) ===
Following his success on mini-bikes, Ikegami stepped up to the bigger NSF250R for the All Japan Road Race Championship. In 2023, he entered the J-GP3 class full-time with the Tetsuta Nagashima-backed MotoUp Racing. Despite a rough start to the season at Motegi, Ikegami set pole position in the second round at Sugo, and finished in second place in the Sunday race. He clinched another podium in the following round at Tsukuba, and finished the season with two podiums and ranked as the best Special Participation rider which earned him a direct spot in the Asia Talent Cup for the 2024 season. In 2024 and 2025, Ikegami competed in J-GP3 races as a wildcard entry at Tsukuba and Motegi, finishing seventh in his last race.

In April 2026, Ikegami was called up by Nagashima's ST600 team to replace the injured Tetsuya Fujita in the Sugo round of the All Japan Road Race Championship. He took part in the pre-weekend public tests held at the same track, and finished in sixth and fourth place in Races 1 and 2, respectively—missing out on the podium by one tenth of a second.

=== Asia Talent Cup (2024–2025) ===
In his debut race in the Asia Talent Cup, Ikegami finished in third place at Lusail. He picked up several podiums throughout the season, including his maiden win in his home round at Motegi. In his second year in the competition, Ikegami fought for the win in several races with compatriot Ryota Ogiwara. He finished in second place in the first eight races, right behind Ogiwara, and ultimately claimed his only win of the season in the closing round at Sepang, losing the championship to Ogiwara—making him runner-up in the overall standings.

=== European Talent Cup and Moto3 Junior (2024–) ===
The same year he competed in the Asia Talent Cup, Ikegami also participated in the European Talent Cup with Gas Up Racing Team. During his first year in Europe, he came close to the podium, picking up two fourth-place finishes at Estoril and Barcelona. He finished in 14th place overall. In late 2025, Ikegami was given a wildcard entry opportunity in the final round of the European Talent Cup at Valencia, with MLav Racing, where he finished in 21st place.

After his two years in the Asia and European Talent Cup, Ikegami signed with AGR Team to compete in the 2026 Moto3 Junior World Championship.

== Career statistics ==
=== FIM MiniGP Japan ===
(key) (Races in bold indicate pole position; races in italics indicate fastest lap)

Year	Bike	1	2	3	4	5	6	7	8	9	10	Pos	Pts
2022	Ohvale	TSU; R1; 3	TSU; R2; 4	**MOT**; **R1**; 3	MOT; R2; 13	MOT; R1; 1	MOT; R2; 1	OKE; R1; 1	**OKE**; **R2**; 1	TSU; R1; 4	TSU; R2; 4	1st	149

=== FIM MiniGP World Series ===
(key) (Races in bold indicate pole position; races in italics indicate fastest lap)

Year	Class	Bike	1	2	3	Pos	Pts
2022	160cc	Ohvale	VAL; R1; 1	VAL; R2; 7	VAL; SFR; 4	3rd	60

=== All Japan Road Race Championship ===
==== Races by year ====
(key) (Races in bold indicate pole position; races in italics indicate fastest lap)

Year	Class	Bike	1	2	3	4	5	6	7	Pos	Pts
2022	J-GP3	Honda	MOT	SUG	TSU; 23	AUT	OKA	SUZ		NC (Note: Competed under a Special Participation license which is ineligible for points.)	-
2023	J-GP3	Honda	MOT; 26†	**SUG**; 2	TSU; 3	AUT; 6	OKA; 20	SUZ; 13		NC	-
2024	J-GP3	Honda	MOT	SUG	TSU; 4	AUT	OKA	SUZ		18th	13
2025	J-GP3	Honda	SUG	TSU1; DSQ	TSU2; DSQ	MOT; 7	AUT	OKA	SUZ	18th	9
2026	ST600	Honda	SUG1; 6	SUG2; 4	AUT	MOT	OKA	SUZ		14th	23

- † – Rider did not finish the race, but was classified as he completed more than ~75% of the race distance.

=== Asia Talent Cup ===
==== Races by year ====
(key) (Races in bold indicate pole position, races in italics indicate fastest lap)

Year	Bike	1		2		3		4		5		6		Pos	Pts
Year	Bike	R1	R2	R1	R2	R1	R2	R1	R2	R1	R2	R1	R2	Pos	Pts
2024	Honda	LUS; 3	LUS; 17	SEP; Ret	SEP; 6	MAN; 2	MAN; 4	MOT; 3	MOT; 1	BUR; 9	BUR; 14	SEP; 2	SEP; 5	5th	140
2025	Honda	**BUR**; 2	**BUR**; 2	LUS; 2	LUS; 2	SEP; 2	SEP; 2	**MOT**; 2	**MOT**; 2	MAN; Ret	MAN; 2	SEP; 1	SEP; 20	2nd	205

=== European Talent Cup ===
==== Races by year ====
(key) (Races in bold indicate pole position; races in italics indicate fastest lap)

Year	Bike	1	2	3	4	5	6	7	8	9	10	11	Pos	Pts
2024	Honda	MIS; Ret	MIS; 12	EST; 15	EST; 4	BAR; 4	ALG	JER; 13	JER; 16	ARA; DNQ	ARA; DNQ	EST; 11	14th	39
2025	Honda	EST1	EST2	JER1	JER2	MAG1	MAG2	ARA	MIS1	MIS2	CAT	VAL; 21	46th	0

=== FIM Moto3 Junior World Championship ===
==== Races by year ====
(key) (Races in bold indicate pole position; races in italics indicate fastest lap)

Year	Bike	1	2	3	4	5	6	7	8	9	10	11	12	Pos	Pts
2026	KTM	CAT1; DNQ	CAT2; DNQ	EST; Ret	JER1; DNS	JER2; 19	MAG; 22	VAL1; 16	VAL2; 15	ARA1; 17	ARA2; Ret	MIS1; 20	MIS2; 15	27th	2
