= 2025 Asia Road Racing Championship =

30th season Asia Road Racing Championship

2025 Asia Road Racing Championship
Previous:	2024	Next:	2026

The 2025 FIM Asia Road Racing Championship was the 30th season of the Asia Road Racing Championship. The season started on 25 April at Chang International Circuit in Thailand and finished on 7 December back at the same circuit.

== Calendar ==
The preliminary calendar was released on 27 November 2024.

Round	Race	Circuit	Date
1	1	(Thailand) Chang International Circuit, Buriram	25–27 April
1	2	(Thailand) Chang International Circuit, Buriram	25–27 April
2	3	(Malaysia) Petronas Sepang International Circuit, Sepang	30 May–1 June
2	4	(Malaysia) Petronas Sepang International Circuit, Sepang	30 May–1 June
3	5	(Japan) Mobility Resort Motegi, Motegi	11–13 July
3	6	(Japan) Mobility Resort Motegi, Motegi	11–13 July
4	7	(Indonesia) Pertamina Mandalika International Street Circuit, Mandalika	29–31 August
4	8	(Indonesia) Pertamina Mandalika International Street Circuit, Mandalika	29–31 August
5	9	(Malaysia) Petronas Sepang International Circuit, Sepang	10–12 October
5	10	(Malaysia) Petronas Sepang International Circuit, Sepang	10–12 October
6	11	(Thailand) Chang International Circuit, Buriram	5–7 December
6	12	(Thailand) Chang International Circuit, Buriram	5–7 December

== Teams and riders ==
2025 ASB1000 Entry List
Team	Constructor	Motorcycle	No.	Rider	Rounds
(Japan) Tatara Aprilia Team	Aprilia	RSV4 1100	17	(Japan) Ruka Wada	3
(Japan) Tatara Aprilia Team	Aprilia	RSV4 1100	18	(Japan) Maiku Watanuki	5
(Japan) Tatara Aprilia Team	Aprilia	RSV4 1100	98	(Japan) Akito Haga	2–3
(Malaysia) A1 Energy BMW	BMW	BMW M1000RR	24	(Thailand) Apiwat Wongthananon	1–5
(Malaysia) A1 Energy BMW	BMW	BMW M1000RR	25	(Malaysia) Azlan Shah Kamaruzaman	1–5
(Malaysia) Savitar Racing Asia	BMW	BMW M1000RR	16	(Malaysia) Teo Yew Joe	All
(Malaysia) Savitar Racing Asia	BMW	BMW M1000RR	83	(Australia) Lachlan Epis	All
(Malaysia) Savitar Racing Asia	BMW	BMW M1000RR	220	(Australia) Declan Carberry	5–6
(Malaysia) FGRT Project One	Ducati	Panigale V4 R	85	(Malaysia) Fahmi Abdul Wahaf	2
(Malaysia) JDT Racing Team	Ducati	Panigale V4 R	55	(Malaysia) Hafizh Syahrin	All
(Malaysia) JDT Racing Team	Ducati	Panigale V4 R	88	(Japan) Ryo Mizuno	5–6
(Indonesia) Astra Honda Racing Team	Honda	CBR1000RR-R Fireblade SP	23	(Indonesia) Andi Farid Izdihar	1–2, 4–6
Honda Racing Thailand	Honda	CBR1000RR-R Fireblade SP	41	(Thailand) Nakarin Atiratphuvapat	All
Idemitsu Honda Racing Malaysia	Honda	CBR1000RR-R Fireblade SP	20	(Malaysia) Azroy Anuar	All
Idemitsu Honda Racing Malaysia	Honda	CBR1000RR-R Fireblade SP	21	(Malaysia) Zaqhwan Zaidi	All
(Japan) Moto BUM HONDA	Honda	CBR1000RR-R Fireblade SP	15	(Japan) Motoharu Ito	3
Japan Post Honda Racing	Honda	CBR1000RR-R Fireblade SP	230	(Japan) Sho Nishimura	3
SDG HARC-PRO. Honda Philippines	Honda	CBR1000RR-R Fireblade SP	39	(Japan) Keito Abe	All
(Japan) Kawasaki Plaza Racing Team	Kawasaki	ZX-10R	64	(Japan) Ryosuke Iwato	3
(Malaysia) AMI Suzuki Motorsport	Suzuki	GSX-R1000R	77	(Malaysia) Adam Norrodin	2, 6
(Japan) Team Titan-TKR Suzuki	Suzuki	GSX-R1000R	11	(Japan) Takeru Murase	3
(Japan) Akeno Speed Green Cycle	Yamaha	YZF-R1M	74	(Japan) Shota Ite	3
(Japan) Dog Fight Racing	Yamaha	YZF-R1M	67	(Japan) Rei Toshima	3
(Australia) MotoGo Yamaha Racing Team	Yamaha	YZF-R1M	12	(Australia) Cameron Dunker	All
(Thailand) TNP Motorsport	Yamaha	YZF-R1M	29	(Thailand) Natetan Thongkoat	6
(Malaysia) Victor Racing Team	Yamaha	YZF-R1M	40	(United Kingdom) Joe Francis	2–6
(Malaysia) Victor Racing Team	Yamaha	YZF-R1M	157	(Thailand) Samuel Convento	1
2025 SS600 Entry List
Team	Constructor	Motorcycle	No.	Rider	Rounds
(Indonesia) Astra Honda Racing Team	Honda	CBR600RR	21	(Indonesia) Adenanta Putra	All
(Indonesia) Astra Honda Racing Team	Honda	CBR600RR	46	(Indonesia) Herjun Firdaus	All
(Indonesia) Astra Honda Racing Team	Honda	CBR600RR	123	(Indonesia) Rheza Danica Ahrens	All
(Thailand) Fusport Team Asia	Honda	CBR600RR	37	(Australia) Jack Mahaffy	1
Honda Racing Thailand	Honda	CBR600RR	18	(Thailand) Kitsada Tanachot	All
Honda Racing Thailand	Honda	CBR600RR	20	(Thailand) Jakkreephat Phuettisan	All
Honda Racing Thailand	Honda	CBR600RR	31	(Thailand) Thanat Laoongplio	All
Idemitsu Honda Racing Malaysia	Honda	CBR600RR	32	(Malaysia) Helmi Azman	All
Idemitsu Honda Racing Malaysia	Honda	CBR600RR	44	(Malaysia) Khairul Idham Pawi	All
Idemitsu Honda Racing Malaysia	Honda	CBR600RR	63	(Malaysia) Syarifuddin Azman	All
(Indonesia) MSGlowForMen Racing Team	Honda	CBR600RR	99	(Indonesia) Dimas Ekky Pratama	4
SDG HARC-PRO. Honda Philippines	Honda	CBR600RR	53	(Japan) Amon Odaki	3
(Malaysia) Hong Leong Yamaha Racing	Yamaha	YZF-R6	23	(Philippines) Mckinley Kyle Paz	All
(Malaysia) Hong Leong Yamaha Racing	Yamaha	YZF-R6	24	(Japan) Soichiro Minamimoto	3
(Malaysia) Hong Leong Yamaha Racing	Yamaha	YZF-R6	27	(Malaysia) Kasma Daniel	All
(Japan) Nitro Ryota Racing	Yamaha	YZF-R6	16	(Japan) Keisuke Tanaka	3
(Thailand) One For All	Yamaha	YZF-R6	15	(Germany) Rocco Sessler	All
(Thailand) TNP Motorsport	Yamaha	YZF-R6	241	(Thailand) Apiwat Wongthananon	6
(Malaysia) Victor Racing Team	Yamaha	YZF-R6	22	(China) Sha Juntong	All
Yamaha Racing Indonesia	Yamaha	YZF-R6	36	(Indonesia) Faerozi Toreqottullah	All
Yamaha Racing Indonesia	Yamaha	YZF-R6	57	(Indonesia) Aldi Satya Mahendra	6
Yamaha Racing Indonesia	Yamaha	YZF-R6	89	(Indonesia) Wahyu Nugroho	All
Yamaha Thailand Racing Team	Yamaha	YZF-R6	500	(Thailand) Anupab Sarmoon	All
2025 AP250 Entry List
Team	Constructor	Motorcycle	No.	Rider	Rounds
(Indonesia) Astra Honda Racing Team	Honda	CBR250RR	24	(Indonesia) Davino Britani	All
(Indonesia) Astra Honda Racing Team	Honda	CBR250RR	93	(Indonesia) Fadillah Arbi Aditama	All
(Malaysia) Estremo Yuzy Asia Team	Honda	CBR250RR	19	(Vietnam) Nguyễn Tôn Anh Phú	All
Honda Racing Thailand	Honda	CBR250RR	12	(Thailand) Panjaruch Chitwirulchat	1, 6
Honda Racing Thailand	Honda	CBR250RR	20	(Thailand) Noprutpong Bunprawes	6
Honda Racing Thailand	Honda	CBR250RR	86	(Thailand) Napat Jatoom	1
Honda Racing Vietnam Team	Honda	CBR250RR	18	(Vietnam) Nguyễn Hữu Trí	All
Honda Racing Vietnam Team	Honda	CBR250RR	65	(Vietnam) Cao Việt Nam	All
Idemitsu Honda Racing India	Honda	CBR250RR	13	(India) Johann Reeves Emmanuel	All
Idemitsu Honda Racing India	Honda	CBR250RR	14	(India) Kavin Quintal	All
(Malaysia) Maeztro NWN SCK Honda Racing Team	Honda	CBR250RR	16	(Indonesia) Irfan Ardiansyah	All
(Malaysia) Maeztro NWN SCK Honda Racing Team	Honda	CBR250RR	21	(Malaysia) Irfan Haykal	All
(Indonesia) MSGlowForMen Racing Team	Honda	CBR250RR	99	(Indonesia) Gerry Salim	4
(Japan) Sanwa Racing Team	Honda	CBR250RR	78	(Japan) Hikari Okubo	3
(Japan) Sanwa Racing Team	Honda	CBR250RR	97	(Japan) Ryota Ogiwara	3
SDG HARC-PRO. Honda Philippines	Honda	CBR250RR	32	(Philippines) Jakob Sablaya	1–2, 4–5
SDG HARC-PRO. Honda Philippines	Honda	CBR250RR	50	(Japan) Kotaro Togashi	3
SDG HARC-PRO. Honda Philippines	Honda	CBR250RR	51	(Philippines) Alfonsi Daquigan	6
(Indonesia) Motul Kawasaki Sniper Manual Tech	Kawasaki	ZX-25R	37	(Japan) Aiki Iyoshi	All
(Indonesia) Motul Kawasaki Sniper Manual Tech	Kawasaki	ZX-25R	108	(Indonesia) Andy Muhammad Fadly	All
(Japan) Akeno Speed Green Cycle	Yamaha	YZF-R3	81	(Japan) Rintaro Takemoto	3
(Malaysia) Cardinals Factory Yamaha Zynergys Racing Team ARRC	Yamaha	YZF-R3	17	(Malaysia) Abdullah Qayyum Razak	5–6
(Malaysia) Cardinals Factory Yamaha Zynergys Racing Team ARRC	Yamaha	YZF-R3	31	(Malaysia) Farres Putra	1–4
(Indonesia) Green Plafon Racing	Yamaha	YZF-R3	5	(Indonesia) Wilman Hammar	4
(Thailand) One For All	Yamaha	YZF-R3	71	(China) Liu Guangyuan	All
(Thailand) One For All	Yamaha	YZF-R3	73	(China) Gao Zi'ang	1–5
(Thailand) One For All	Yamaha	YZF-R3	75	(China) Lu Yin	6
(China) T.Y. Antares Racing Team	Yamaha	YZF-R3	40	(China) Shuncheng Zhang	1–4, 6
(China) T.Y. Antares Racing Team	Yamaha	YZF-R3	44	(Japan) Riichi Takahira	1–4
(China) T.Y. Antares Racing Team	Yamaha	YZF-R3	66	(Brazil) Humberto Maier	6
(China) T.Y. Antares Racing Team	Yamaha	YZF-R3	80	(Indonesia) Fadil Algassani	5
(China) T.Y. Antares Racing Team	Yamaha	YZF-R3	81	(Japan) Rintaro Takemoto	5–6
(Singapore) Team ACR	Yamaha	YZF-R3	68	(Singapore) Jazil Juraimi	All
(Japan) Team Tech2 & YSS	Yamaha	YZF-R3	62	(Japan) Ryuji Yokoe	3
(Malaysia) UMA Racing YAMAHA Maju Motor Asia Team	Yamaha	YZF-R3	57	(Malaysia) Danial Syahmi	All
(Malaysia) Victor Racing Team	Yamaha	YZF-R3	15	(Hong Kong) Leong Nang Tse	All
(Malaysia) Victor Racing Team	Yamaha	YZF-R3	124	(Malaysia) Izam Ikmal	All
(Indonesia) Yamaha AMS Cargloss RRS	Yamaha	YZF-R3	222	(Indonesia) Jorhans Richard Josua	4
(Indonesia) Yamaha BAF Yamalube Akai Jaya MBKW2 Racing	Yamaha	YZF-R3	56	(Indonesia) Galang Hendra Pratama	All
(Indonesia) Yamaha BAF Yamalube Akai Jaya MBKW2 Racing	Yamaha	YZF-R3	69	(Indonesia) Aldiaz Ismaya	All
Yamaha LFN HP969 Indonesia Racing Team	Yamaha	YZF-R3	157	(Indonesia) Murobbil Vittoni	1–5
Yamaha Racing Indonesia	Yamaha	YZF-R3	8	(Indonesia) Candra Hermawan	All
Yamaha Racing Indonesia	Yamaha	YZF-R3	80	(Indonesia) Fadil Algassani	1–2, 4
Yamaha Racing Indonesia	Yamaha	YZF-R3	571	(Indonesia) Fadhil Musyavi	3, 5–6
Yamaha Racing Indonesia	Yamaha	YZF-R3	571	(Indonesia) Fadhil Musyavi	4
Yamaha Thailand Racing Team	Yamaha	YZF-R3	39	(Thailand) Krittapat Keankum	All
(Thailand) Yamaha Vit Choburi	Yamaha	YZF-R3	36	(Thailand) Teeranai Tubtim	6
2025 UB150 Entry List
Team	Constructor	Motorcycle	No.	Rider	Rounds
(Malaysia) Estremo Yuzy Asia Team	Honda	Honda RSX150	41	(Malaysia) Aqeel Danish	6
(Malaysia) Estremo Yuzy Asia Team	Honda	Honda RSX150	51	(Malaysia) Ahmad Darwisy	1–5
(Malaysia) Estremo Yuzy Asia Team	Honda	Honda RSX150	61	(Malaysia) Shahrol Syazras	All
(Malaysia) Maeztro NWN SCK Honda Racing Team	Honda	Honda RSX150	29	(Indonesia) Badly Ayatullah	3–4
(Malaysia) Maeztro NWN SCK Honda Racing Team	Honda	Honda RSX150	63	(Malaysia) Amirul Ariff Musa	1–2, 6
(Malaysia) Maeztro NWN SCK Honda Racing Team	Honda	Honda RSX150	122	(Malaysia) Shafiq Rasol	5
(Indonesia) JPNW SND Factory Racing	Honda	Honda Supra GTR 150	177	(Indonesia) Aditya Fauzi	All
(Indonesia) JPNW SND Factory Racing	Honda	Honda Supra GTR 150	178	(Indonesia) Kiki Sudarman	All
(Indonesia) RMF Trans Racing Team	Honda	Honda Supra GTR 150	138	(Indonesia) Wawan Wello	4
(Indonesia) RMF Trans Racing Team	Honda	Honda Supra GTR 150	183	(Indonesia) Aan Riswanto	4
(Malaysia) Voge AS25 Racing Team	Voge	FR150	73	(Malaysia) Tengku Amirul Haffirudin	All
(Malaysia) Voge AS25 Racing Team	Voge	FR150	83	(Malaysia) Afizi Supaat	All
(Indonesia) Galang 28 Racing Team	Yamaha	Yamaha MX King 150	257	(Indonesia) Jordan Badaru	4
(Indonesia) GG Galak Galak	Yamaha	Yamaha MX King 150	70	(Indonesia) Syirat Syauqi	4
(Indonesia) Racetech Sixty Racing Team	Yamaha	Yamaha MX King 150	60	(Indonesia) Wahyu Aji Trilaksana	All
(Indonesia) Racetech Sixty Racing Team	Yamaha	Yamaha MX King 150	202	(Indonesia) Dimas Juli Atmoko	All
(Indonesia) Wasaka Racetech Racing Team	Yamaha	Yamaha MX King 150	279	(Indonesia) Hendra Rusady	4
Yamaha LFN HP969 Indonesia Racing Team	Yamaha	Yamaha MX King 150	117	(Indonesia) Fadli Rigani	6
Yamaha LFN HP969 Indonesia Racing Team	Yamaha	Yamaha MX King 150	127	(Indonesia) Riky Ibrahim	3
Yamaha LFN HP969 Indonesia Racing Team	Yamaha	Yamaha MX King 150	145	(Indonesia) Danial Damar	4–5
Yamaha LFN HP969 Indonesia Racing Team	Yamaha	Yamaha MX King 150	198	(Indonesia) Awhin Sanjaya	1–2
Yamaha LFN HP969 Indonesia Racing Team	Yamaha	Yamaha MX King 150	222	(Indonesia) Fahmi Basam	All
Yamaha LFN HP969 Indonesia Racing Team	Yamaha	Yamaha MX King 150	229	(Indonesia) Arghiya Farrel	4
(Indonesia) Ziear LFN HP969 MCR RBT 34	Yamaha	Yamaha MX King 150	23	(Indonesia) Gupita Kresna	All
(Indonesia) Ziear LFN HP969 MCR RBT 34	Yamaha	Yamaha MX King 150	143	(Indonesia) Husni Fuadzy	All
(Philippines) 4S1M EVO Yamaha Racing Team	Yamaha	Yamaha Sniper 150	25	(Philippines) John Emerson Inguito	1–4, 6
(Philippines) 4S1M EVO Yamaha Racing Team	Yamaha	Yamaha Sniper 150	70	(Indonesia) Syirat Syauqi	5
(Philippines) 4S1M EVO Yamaha Racing Team	Yamaha	Yamaha Sniper 150	96	(Indonesia) Hafizd Rasyadan	All
(Philippines) Koby Sec Yamaha Racing Team	Yamaha	Yamaha Sniper 150	17	(Philippines) Masato Fernando	All
(Philippines) UMA MMR Yamaha Philippine Racing Team	Yamaha	Yamaha Sniper 150	20	(Philippines) Kervie Bergania	5
(Philippines) UMA MMR Yamaha Philippine Racing Team	Yamaha	Yamaha Sniper 150	22	(Philippines) E.J. Sobretodo	All
(Philippines) UMA MMR Yamaha Philippine Racing Team	Yamaha	Yamaha Sniper 150	43	(Philippines) April King Mascardo	All
(Philippines) UMA MMR Yamaha Philippine Racing Team	Yamaha	Yamaha Sniper 150	78	(Philippines) Timothy Jonathan Rojas	6
(Malaysia) Cardinals Factory Yamaha Zynergys Racing Team ARRC	Yamaha	Yamaha Y15 ZR	11	(Malaysia) Ahmad Fazrul Sham	All
(Malaysia) Cardinals Factory Yamaha Zynergys Racing Team ARRC	Yamaha	Yamaha Y15 ZR	31	(Malaysia) Syamil Amsyar	1–4
(Malaysia) Cardinals Factory Yamaha Zynergys Racing Team ARRC	Yamaha	Yamaha Y15 ZR	98	(Malaysia) Izzat Zaidi	5–6
(Malaysia) KM+ AHM Motor Sports	Yamaha	Yamaha Y15 ZR	15	(Malaysia) Faiz Zekri	2
(Thailand) One For All	Yamaha	Yamaha Y15 ZR	24	(Thailand) Peerapong Luiboonpeng	All
(Thailand) One For All	Yamaha	Yamaha Y15 ZR	88	(Indonesia) Muhammad Febriansyah	1–2, 4–6
(Thailand) One For All	Yamaha	Yamaha Y15 ZR	257	(Indonesia) Jordan Badaru	3
(Malaysia) Pitsbike Superfast JRT Racing Team	Yamaha	Yamaha Y15 ZR	13	(Malaysia) Akid Aziz	All
(Malaysia) Pitsbike Superfast JRT Racing Team	Yamaha	Yamaha Y15 ZR	50	(Malaysia) Ahmad Afif Amran	All
(Malaysia) RCB Yamaha Yypang Racing Team	Yamaha	Yamaha Y15 ZR	38	(Malaysia) Idil Fitri Mahadi	2
(Malaysia) TKKR Rapido Estremo Superfast Racing Team	Yamaha	Yamaha Y15 ZR	122	(Malaysia) Shafiq Rasol	2
(Malaysia) UMA Racing YAMAHA Maju Motor Asia Team	Yamaha	Yamaha Y15 ZR	27	(Malaysia) Adib Arsyad	All
(Malaysia) UMA Racing YAMAHA Maju Motor Asia Team	Yamaha	Yamaha Y15 ZR	87	(Malaysia) Nazirul Izzat	All
2025 TVS Asia One Make Championship Entry List
Team	Constructor	Motorcycle	No.	Rider	Rounds
TVS AOM Racing	TVS	TVS Apache RR310	1	(Japan) Hiroki Ono	All
TVS AOM Racing	TVS	TVS Apache RR310	2	(Malaysia) Ramdan Rosli	All
TVS AOM Racing	TVS	TVS Apache RR310	3	(India) Sarthak Chavan	All
TVS AOM Racing	TVS	TVS Apache RR310	4	(India) Chiranth Vishwanath	All
TVS AOM Racing	TVS	TVS Apache RR310	5	(Thailand) Atih Kanghair	1–2
TVS AOM Racing	TVS	TVS Apache RR310	6	(South Korea) Kim Min-jae	1–4, 6
TVS AOM Racing	TVS	TVS Apache RR310	7	(India) KY Ahamed	1–2, 6
TVS AOM Racing	TVS	TVS Apache RR310	8	(Spain) Luis Miguel	All
TVS AOM Racing	TVS	TVS Apache RR310	9	(Australia) Hunter Corney	1–4
TVS AOM Racing	TVS	TVS Apache RR310	10	(Indonesia) Rendi Odding	1–5
TVS AOM Racing	TVS	TVS Apache RR310	11	(Thailand) Kanatat Jaiman	1–2, 5–6
TVS AOM Racing	TVS	TVS Apache RR310	12	(Malaysia) Haziq Fairues	1–2, 5–6
TVS AOM Racing	TVS	TVS Apache RR310	13	(Philippines) Leendro Paredes	All
TVS AOM Racing	TVS	TVS Apache RR310	14	(Singapore) Arsyad Rusydi	1–2
TVS AOM Racing	TVS	TVS Apache RR310	15	(India) Senthikumar Chandrasekaran	1
TVS AOM Racing	TVS	TVS Apache RR310	16	(Thailand) Vorapong Malahuan	1–4, 6
TVS AOM Racing	TVS	TVS Apache RR310	17	(New Zealand) Nixon Frost	2–6
TVS AOM Racing	TVS	TVS Apache RR310	18	(Japan) Shingo Iidaka	3
TVS AOM Racing	TVS	TVS Apache RR310	19	(India) Alwin Sundar	3
TVS AOM Racing	TVS	TVS Apache RR310	20	(Malaysia) Farish Hafiy	3
TVS AOM Racing	TVS	TVS Apache RR310	21	(Japan) Riku Matsushima	3
TVS AOM Racing	TVS	TVS Apache RR310	22	(United Kingdom) Harley McCabe	4–5
TVS AOM Racing	TVS	TVS Apache RR310	23	(India) Rakshith Shihari	4, 6
TVS AOM Racing	TVS	TVS Apache RR310	24	(Indonesia) Rama Putra	4
TVS AOM Racing	TVS	TVS Apache RR310	25	(Indonesia) Decksa Alfarezel	4
TVS AOM Racing	TVS	TVS Apache RR310	26	(Malaysia) Hafiza Rofa	5
TVS AOM Racing	TVS	TVS Apache RR310	27	(Australia) Jed Louis	5
TVS AOM Racing	TVS	TVS Apache RR310	28	(Colombia) Jhon A Lopez	6
TVS AOM Racing	TVS	TVS Apache RR310	29	(South Africa) Oratilwe Phiri	6

All teams use series-specified Dunlop tyres.

== Results ==
Round		Circuit	Date	ASB1000 Winners	ASS600 Winners	ASS250 Winners	UB150 Winners	TVS Asia Winners	Report
1	1	(Thailand) Buriram 1	26 April	(Thailand) Nakarin Atiratphuvapat	(Indonesia) Adenanta Putra	(Indonesia) Fadillah Arbi Aditama	(Indonesia) Husni Fuadzy	(Japan) Hiroki Ono	
1	2	(Thailand) Buriram 1	27 April	(Thailand) Nakarin Atiratphuvapat	(Malaysia) Kasma Daniel	(Indonesia) Fadillah Arbi Aditama	(Indonesia) Gupita Kresna	(India) Sarthak Chavan	
2	3	(Malaysia) Sepang 1	31 May	(Malaysia) Azroy Anuar	(Indonesia) Adenanta Putra	(Indonesia) Fadillah Arbi Aditama	(Indonesia) Husni Fuadzy	(Malaysia) Ramdan Rosli	
2	4	(Malaysia) Sepang 1	1 June	(Malaysia) Azroy Anuar	(Malaysia) Helmi Azman	(Thailand) Krittapat Keankum	(Indonesia) Husni Fuadzy	(Spain) Luis Miguel	
3	5	(Japan) Motegi	12 July	(Japan) Keito Abe	(Thailand) Anupab Sarmoon	(Malaysia) Izam Ikmal	(Indonesia) Husni Fuadzy	(Japan) Hiroki Ono	
3	6	(Japan) Motegi	13 July	(Malaysia) Hafizh Syahrin	(Indonesia) Adenanta Putra	(Thailand) Krittapat Keankum	(Indonesia) Husni Fuadzy	(Japan) Hiroki Ono	
4	7	(Indonesia) Mandalika	30 August	(Malaysia) Hafizh Syahrin	(Indonesia) Adenanta Putra	(Indonesia) Fadillah Arbi Aditama	(Indonesia) Dimas Juli Atmoko	(Japan) Hiroki Ono	
4	8	(Indonesia) Mandalika	31 August	(Malaysia) Azlan Shah	(Indonesia) Herjun Firdaus	(Indonesia) Murobbil Vittoni	(Indonesia) Dimas Juli Atmoko	(Malaysia) Ramdan Rosli	
5	9	(Malaysia) Sepang 2	11 October	(Malaysia) Hafizh Syahrin	(Malaysia) Syarifuddin Azman	(Indonesia) Candra Hermawan	(Malaysia) Ahmad Afif Amran	(Japan) Hiroki Ono	
5	10	(Malaysia) Sepang 2	12 October	(Malaysia) Azroy Anuar	(Malaysia) Syarifuddin Azman	(Indonesia) Fadillah Arbi Aditama	(Malaysia) Ahmad Afif Amran	(Japan) Hiroki Ono	
6	11	(Thailand) Buriram 2	6 December	(Malaysia) Hafizh Syahrin	(Thailand) Apiwat Wongthananon	(Indonesia) Fadillah Arbi Aditama	(Indonesia) Husni Fuadzy	(Malaysia) Ramdan Rosli	
6	12	(Thailand) Buriram 2	7 December	(Thailand) Nakarin Atiratphuvapat	(Thailand) Thanat Laoongplio	(Thailand) Krittapat Keankum	(Thailand) Peerapong Luiboonpeng	(Japan) Hiroki Ono	

== Championship standings ==
Points

Position	1st	2nd	3rd	4th	5th	6th	7th	8th	9th	10th	11th	12th	13th	14th	15th
Points	25	20	16	13	11	10	9	8	7	6	5	4	3	2	1

=== Riders standings ===
==== Asia Superbike 1000 ====
Pos.	Rider	Bike	BUR1 (Thailand)		SEP1 (Malaysia)		MOT (Japan)		MAN (Indonesia)		SEP2 (Malaysia)		BUR2 (Thailand)		Pts
Pos.	Rider	Bike	R1	R2	R1	R2	R1	R2	R1	R2	R1	R2	R1	R2	Pts
1	(Malaysia) Hafizh Syahrin	Ducati	3	5	2	2	Ret^{P}	1^{P}	1^{PF}	Ret^{PF}	1^{P}	10^{P}	1^{F}	2	193
2	(Thailand) Nakarin Atiratphuvapat	Honda	1	1	9	4	11	4^{F}	2	8	3	2	4	1^{F}	190
3	(Japan) Keito Abe	Honda	5	3	4	3	1	2	9	2	Ret^{F}	4	3^{P}	4^{P}	170
4	(Malaysia) Zaqhwan Zaidi	Honda	2^{PF}	2^{P}	3	14	3	5	3	4	2	9	5	3	168
5	(Malaysia) Azroy Anuar	Honda	8	4	1	1	2^{F}	Ret	5	Ret	8	1^{F}	WD	WD	135
6	(Indonesia) Andi Farid Izdihar	Honda	6	9^{F}	6	11^{F}			7	3	Ret	3	2	6	103
7	(Malaysia) Azlan Shah	BMW	7	6	7	5	7	6	4	1	DNS	DNS			96
8	(Australia) Lachlan Epis	BMW	9	7	8	7	Ret	9	Ret	NC	4	5	6	5	85
9	(Australia) Cameron Dunker	Yamaha	10	8	10	8	9	11	6	5	7	6	Ret	DNS	80
10	(United Kingdom) Joe Francis	Yamaha			11	10	15	13	8	7	6	8	Ret	8	58
11	(Malaysia) Teo Yew Joe	BMW	12	10	12	13	16	14	10	9	DNS	Ret	10	10	44
12	(Thailand) Apiwat Wongthananon	BMW	4	Ret	Ret^{PF}	6^{P}	12	Ret	Ret	6	DNS	DNS			37
13	(Japan) Sho Nishimura	Honda					4	3							29
14	(Australia) Declan Carberry	BMW									9	11	9	9	26
15	(Japan) Maiku Watanuki	Aprilia									5	7			20
16	(Malaysia) Adam Norrodin	Suzuki			5	Ret							7	Ret	20
17	(Japan) Rei Toshima	Yamaha					6	8							18
18	(Japan) Akito Haga	Aprilia			Ret	9	14	12							13
19	(Japan) Shota Ite	Yamaha					13	7							12
20	(Japan) Takeru Murase	Suzuki					10	10							12
21	(Japan) Motoharu Ito	Honda					5	Ret							11
22	(Japan) Ryo Mizuno	Ducati									DNS	DNS	Ret	7	9
23	(Thailand) Natetan Thongkoat	Yamaha											8	Ret	8
24	(Japan) Ruka Wada	Aprilia					8	Ret							8
25	(Malaysia) Fahmi Abdul	Ducati			13	12									7
26	(Thailand) Samuel Convento	Yamaha	11	Ret											5
	(Japan) Ryosuke Iwato	Kawasaki					DNS	DNS							0

Colour	Result
Gold	Winner
Silver	Second place
Bronze	Third place
Green	Points classification
Blue	Non-points classification
Blue	Non-classified finish (NC)
Purple	Retired, not classified (Ret)
Red	Did not qualify (DNQ)
Red	Did not pre-qualify (DNPQ)
Black	Disqualified (DSQ)
White	Did not start (DNS)
White	Withdrew (WD)
White	Race cancelled (C)
Blank	Did not practice (DNP)
Blank	Did not arrive (DNA)
Blank	Excluded (EX)

P – Pole position
F – Fastest lap

==== Asia Supersport 600 ====
Pos.	Rider	Bike	BUR1 (Thailand)		SEP1 (Malaysia)		MOT (Japan)		MAN (Indonesia)		SEP2 (Malaysia)		BUR2 (Thailand)		Pts
Pos.	Rider	Bike	R1	R2	R1	R2	R1	R2	R1	R2	R1	R2	R1	R2	Pts
1	(Malaysia) Kasma Daniel	Yamaha	Ret	1^{F}	2^{PF}	13^{P}	2^{P}	5^{P}	7	3	2^{PF}	2^{P}	6	4	167
2	(Thailand) Anupab Sarmoon	Yamaha	5	2	3	3	1	4	12	Ret	3	6	2^{F}	3	167
3	(Indonesia) Adenanta Putra	Honda	1	3	1	15	3^{F}	1	1	Ret	13	3	Ret	Ret	152
4	(Indonesia) Wahyu Nugroho	Yamaha	3	5	12	5	4	2^{F}	2^{P}	Ret^{P}	Ret	4	7	12	121
5	(Thailand) Thanat Laoongplio	Honda	4	6	4	Ret	10	6	5^{F}	Ret	6	7	4	1^{F}	120
6	(Malaysia) Helmi Azman	Honda	7	4	6	1^{F}	7	14	14	5	4	8	9	8	117
7	(Malaysia) Syarifuddin Azman	Honda	6^{P}	12^{P}	7	4	Ret	9	Ret	7	1	1^{F}	10	11	113
8	(Indonesia) Herjun Firdaus	Honda	8	9	8	7	8	Ret	Ret	1	5	9	8	7	100
9	(Philippines) McKinley Kyle Paz	Yamaha	2^{F}	Ret	9	6	5	3	6	6	10	12	12	14	100
10	(Malaysia) Khairul Idham Pawi	Honda	13	7	5	2	6	Ret	Ret	4^{F}	7	10	5	10	98
11	(Thailand) Kitsada Tanachot	Honda	11	8	13	10	11	11	4	2	WD	WD	Ret	6	75
12	(Indonesia) Faerozi Toreqottullah	Yamaha	9	Ret	11	14	13	10	3	11	8	5	11	Ret	68
13	(Germany) Rocco Sessler	Yamaha	12	10	10	8	12	13	10	9	9	13	14	13	59
14	(Thailand) Jakkreephat Phuettisan	Honda			Ret	11	14	12	11	10	11	14	13	9	39
15	(Indonesia) Rheza Danica Ahrens	Honda	10	Ret	Ret	9	Ret	16	8	8	12	11	Ret	DNS	38
16	(Thailand) Apiwat Wongthananon	Yamaha											1^{P}	5^{F}	36
17	(Indonesia) Aldi Satya Mahendra	Yamaha											3	2	36
18	(China) Sha Juntong	Yamaha	14	11	14	12	15	15	13	12	14	15	15	15	27
19	(Japan) Amon Odaki	Honda					9	8							15
20	(Japan) Soichiro Minamimoto	Yamaha					NC	7							9
21	(Indonesia) Dimas Ekky Pratama	Honda							9	Ret					7
	(Australia) Jack Mahaffy	Honda	DNS	DNS											0
	(Japan) Keisuke Tanaka	Yamaha					WD	WD							

Colour	Result
Gold	Winner
Silver	Second place
Bronze	Third place
Green	Points classification
Blue	Non-points classification
Blue	Non-classified finish (NC)
Purple	Retired, not classified (Ret)
Red	Did not qualify (DNQ)
Red	Did not pre-qualify (DNPQ)
Black	Disqualified (DSQ)
White	Did not start (DNS)
White	Withdrew (WD)
White	Race cancelled (C)
Blank	Did not practice (DNP)
Blank	Did not arrive (DNA)
Blank	Excluded (EX)

P – Pole position
F – Fastest lap

==== Asia Production 250 ====
Pos.	Rider	Bike	BUR1 (Thailand)		SEP1 (Malaysia)		MOT (Japan)		MAN (Indonesia)		SEP2 (Malaysia)		BUR2 (Thailand)		Pts
Pos.	Rider	Bike	R1	R2	R1	R2	R1	R2	R1	R2	R1	R2	R1	R2	Pts
1	(Indonesia) Fadillah Arbi Aditama	Honda	1	1	1	8	5	6	1	3	15	1	1	3	212
2	(Thailand) Krittapat Keankum	Yamaha	16^{P}	2^{P}	Ret	1	4	1	3	7	19	6	2^{PF}	1^{P}	163
3	(Malaysia) Izam Ikmal	Yamaha	9	Ret	3^{F}	2^{F}	1	10	6	2	2	5	9	14	144
4	(Indonesia) Murobbil Vittoni	Yamaha	4	4^{F}	12	5	3^{P}	2^{P}	Ret^{P}	1^{P}	17^{P}	2^{P}			122
5	(Indonesia) Candra Hermawan	Yamaha	2	7	15	Ret	8	3^{F}	Ret	11	1	4	5	4^{F}	121
6	(Indonesia) Galang Hendra Pratama	Yamaha	6	5	6	3	Ret	7	4	9	4	8	4	10	116
7	(Indonesia) Irfan Ardiansyah	Honda	5	6	2	7	Ret	23	7	10	18	3	21	19	81
8	(Malaysia) Danial Syahmi	Yamaha	12	10	8	13	12	12	2^{F}	5^{F}	6	16	Ret	9	77
9	(Indonesia) Davino Britani	Honda	3	9	7	Ret	13	17	8	13	Ret	DNS	7	6	65
10	(Japan) Aiki Iyoshi	Kawasaki	8	8	10	11	14	18	9	Ret	5	17	8	8	63
11	(Japan) Riichi Takahira	Yamaha	Ret	27	4^{P}	4^{P}	6^{F}	5	Ret	4					60
12	(Vietnam) Cao Việt Nam	Honda	7	3	Ret	10	17	15	13	15	8	9	14	15	54
13	(Indonesia) Aldiaz Ismaya	Yamaha	23	23	Ret	9	11	9	12	8	12	7	10	12	54
14	(Thailand) Noprutpong Bunprawes	Honda											3	2	36
15	(Malaysia) Irfan Haykal	Honda	Ret^{F}	14	5	6	10	16	14	12	DNS	DNS	17	DNS	35
16	(Japan) Ryota Ogiwara	Honda					2	4							33
17	(Vietnam) Nguyễn Hữu Trí	Honda	13	16	14	16	20	20	15	16	7	10	11	16	26
18	(Indonesia) Fadhil Musyavi	Yamaha					23	13	Ret	14	3	12	Ret	20	25
19	(Thailand) Panjaruch Chitwirulchat	Honda	20	21									6	5	21
20	(Japan) Hikari Okubo	Honda					7	8							17
21	(Malaysia) Farres Putra	Yamaha	17	Ret	11	Ret	19	22	5	18					16
22	(Japan) Rintaro Takemoto	Yamaha					9	11			Ret	15	13	18	16
23	(Indonesia) Andy Muhammad Fadly	Kawasaki	18	24	17	17	16	24	10	25	14	11^{F}	18	13	16
24	(Indonesia) Gerry Salim	Honda							11	6					15
25	(Indonesia) Fadil Algassani	Yamaha	11	12	13	Ret			Ret	21	Ret	14			14
26	(China) Gao Ziang	Yamaha	21	17	9	Ret	18	Ret	Ret	17	11	18			12
27	(Thailand) Napat Jatoom	Honda	10	11											11
28	(Thailand) Teeranai Tubtim	Yamaha											15	7	10
29	(Malaysia) Abdullah Qayyum Razak	Yamaha									9^{F}	13	22	23	10
30	(Singapore) Jazil Juraimi	Honda	22	20	16	12	Ret	Ret	18	23	10	19	24	24	10
31	(Philippines) Alfonsi Daquigan	Honda											12	11	9
32	(Vietnam) Nguyễn Tôn Anh Phú	Honda	14	15	20	14	22	21	Ret	24	13	20	19	21	8
33	(India) Kavin Samaar Quintal	Honda	19	13	18	15	15	Ret	Ret	19	16	21	16	17	5
34	(Japan) Ryuji Yokoe	Yamaha					Ret	14							2
35	(India) Johann Reeves Emmanuel	Honda	15	18	19	20	24	25	16	22	Ret	22	20	22	1
	(China) Shun Cheng Zhang	Yamaha	Ret	22	Ret	18	21	19	17	26			23	25	0
	(Philippines) Alfred Jakob Sablaya	Honda	Ret	19	21	19			Ret	20	Ret	DNS			0
	(Indonesia) Jorhans Richard Josua	Yamaha							19	Ret					0
	(Hong Kong) Leong Nang Tse	Yamaha	25	25	22	21	Ret	Ret	20	27	21	Ret	27	26	0
	(China) Liu Guang Yuan	Yamaha	24	26	Ret	22	25	27	21	28	20	23	25	27	0
	(China) Lu Yin	Yamaha											26	Ret	0
	(Japan) Kotaro Togashi	Honda					26	26							0
	(Brazil) Humberto Maier	Yamaha											Ret	Ret	0
	(Indonesia) Wilman Hammar	Yamaha							WD	WD					

Colour	Result
Gold	Winner
Silver	Second place
Bronze	Third place
Green	Points classification
Blue	Non-points classification
Blue	Non-classified finish (NC)
Purple	Retired, not classified (Ret)
Red	Did not qualify (DNQ)
Red	Did not pre-qualify (DNPQ)
Black	Disqualified (DSQ)
White	Did not start (DNS)
White	Withdrew (WD)
White	Race cancelled (C)
Blank	Did not practice (DNP)
Blank	Did not arrive (DNA)
Blank	Excluded (EX)

P – Pole position
F – Fastest lap

==== Underbone 150 ====
Pos.	Rider	Bike	BUR1 (Thailand)		SEP1 (Malaysia)		MOT (Japan)		MAN (Indonesia)		SEP2 (Malaysia)		BUR2 (Thailand)		Pts
Pos.	Rider	Bike	R1	R2	R1	R2	R1	R2	R1	R2	R1	R2	R1	R2	Pts
1	(Indonesia) Husni Fuadzy	Yamaha	1	4	1	1	1^{F}	1	2	2	3	8	1	5	238
2	(Indonesia) Fahmi Basam	Yamaha	2^{F}	8^{F}	DNS	2	2^{P}	Ret^{P}	3	3	2	2	12^{F}	12	148
3	(Malaysia) Ahmad Afif Amran	Yamaha	3	7	4	Ret	Ret	3	5	6	1^{PF}	1^{P}	Ret	4	138
4	(Indonesia) Dimas Juli Atmoko	Yamaha	9	3	Ret	Ret	5	4	1^{P}	1^{P}	4	5	16^{P}	8^{P}	129
5	(Indonesia) Aditya Fauzi	Honda	11	2	9	13	3	13	23	7	9	Ret	3	6	96
6	(Indonesia) Gupita Kresna	Yamaha	5	1	Ret	DNS	9	Ret	7	20	6	16	Ret	3	78
7	(Philippines) John Emerson Inguito	Yamaha	12	20	6	Ret	10	6	9	8			8	2	73
8	(Malaysia) Akid Aziz	Yamaha	4	6	3^{P}	10^{P}	6	Ret	15	10	Ret	15	11	11	73
9	(Indonesia) Hafizd Rasyadan	Yamaha	8	10	16	8	7	Ret	24	5^{F}	16	6^{F}	6	9	69
10	(Indonesia) Wahyu Aji Trilaksana	Yamaha	7	16	2	17	11	Ret	4	14	5	10	Ret	22	66
11	(Malaysia) Nazirul Izzat	Yamaha	10	5	5	3	Ret	Ret^{F}	28	12	WD	WD	7	13^{F}	60
12	(Thailand) Peerapong Luiboonpeng	Yamaha	14	19	21	18	4	12	13	11	Ret	12	15	1	57
13	(Philippines) April King Mascardo	Yamaha	Ret	12	11	11	8	5	Ret	24	10	11	5	Ret	55
14	(Malaysia) Shahrol Syazras	Honda	DSQ^{P}	23^{P}	13	9	13	7	25	16	12	14	4	7	50
15	(Indonesia) Danial Damar	Yamaha							6	4	7	4			45
16	(Indonesia) Kiki Sudarman	Honda	17	21	17	7	15	8	10	22	13	7	14	20	38
17	(Indonesia) Awhin Sanjaya	Yamaha	6	11	10	4									34
18	(Indonesia) Syirat Syauqi	Yamaha							8^{F}	Ret	8	3			32
19	(Malaysia) Adib Arsyad	Yamaha	Ret	14	7	6	Ret	10	19	Ret	15	13	Ret	19	31
20	(Philippines) E.J. Sobretodo	Yamaha	15	9	8^{F}	16	Ret	9	12	13	Ret	19	Ret	17	30
21	(Indonesia) Riky Ibrahim	Yamaha					16	2							20
22	(Indonesia) Fadli Rigani	Yamaha											2	21	20
23	(Malaysia) Ahmad Darwisy	Yamaha	Ret	13	15	Ret	Ret	Ret	17	Ret	11	9			16
24	(Malaysia) Ahmad Fazrul Sham	Yamaha	Ret	17	Ret	5	Ret	Ret	23	19	Ret	Ret	Ret	15	12
25	(Indonesia) Arghiya Farrel	Yamaha							11	9					12
26	(Indonesia) Muhammad Febriansyah	Yamaha	13	15	Ret	Ret			18	21	Ret	21	10	14	12
27	(Malaysia) Afizi Supaat	Voge	Ret	24	Ret	Ret	Ret	14	26	23	19	20	9	Ret	9
28	(Malaysia) Syamil Amsyar	Yamaha	18	Ret	14	14	Ret	11	Ret	DNS					9
29	(Malaysia) Amirul Ariff Musa	Honda	16	22	19	Ret							17	10	6
30	(Philippines) Masato Fernando	Yamaha	Ret	18	18	Ret	12	Ret	16	Ret	14	17	Ret	23	6
31	(Malaysia) Idil Fitri Mahadi	Yamaha			12	15									5
32	(Malaysia) Faiz Zekri	Yamaha			Ret	12^{F}									4
33	(Philippines) Timothy Jonathan Rojas	Yamaha											13	Ret	3
34	(Indonesia) Jordan Badaru	Yamaha					14	Ret	Ret	15					3
35	(Indonesia) Wawan Wello	Honda							14	Ret					2
36	(Malaysia) Tengku Amirul Haffirudin	Voge	DSQ	Ret	DNS	Ret	Ret	15	27	25	20	Ret	19	Ret	1
	(Malaysia) Aqeel Danish	Honda											18	16	0
	(Malaysia) Izzat Zaidi	Yamaha									17	18	Ret	18	0
	(Indonesia) Badly Ayatullah	Honda					17	Ret	21	18					0
	(Indonesia) Hendra Rusady	Yamaha							22	17					0
	(Malaysia) Shafiq Rasol	Yamaha			20	Ret									0
	(Malaysia) Shafiq Rasol	Honda									18	22			0
	(Philippines) Kervie Bergania	Yamaha									21	23			0
	(Indonesia) Aan Riswanto	Honda							Ret	Ret					0

Colour	Result
Gold	Winner
Silver	Second place
Bronze	Third place
Green	Points classification
Blue	Non-points classification
Blue	Non-classified finish (NC)
Purple	Retired, not classified (Ret)
Red	Did not qualify (DNQ)
Red	Did not pre-qualify (DNPQ)
Black	Disqualified (DSQ)
White	Did not start (DNS)
White	Withdrew (WD)
White	Race cancelled (C)
Blank	Did not practice (DNP)
Blank	Did not arrive (DNA)
Blank	Excluded (EX)

P – Pole position
F – Fastest lap

==== TVS Asia One Make Championship ====
Pos.	Rider	Bike	BUR1 (Thailand)		SEP1 (Malaysia)		MOT (Japan)		MAN (Indonesia)		SEP2 (Malaysia)		BUR2 (Thailand)		Pts
Pos.	Rider	Bike	R1	R2	R1	R2	R1	R2	R1	R2	R1	R2	R1	R2	Pts
1	(Japan) Hiroki Ono	TVS	1	3	2^{F}	4	1^{PF}	1^{PF}	1^{PF}	14^{P}	1^{P}	1^{PF}	4	1^{F}	239
2	(Malaysia) Ramdan Rosli	TVS	2	5	1^{P}	2^{PF}	3	3	4	1^{F}	2^{F}	4	1^{F}	2	224
3	(India) Sarthak Chavan	TVS	5^{P}	1^{P}	3	3	2	2	2	2	3	3	3^{P}	12^{P}	200
4	(Spain) Luis Miguel	TVS	3	Ret	4	1	4	4	13	3	4	2	2	3	168
5	(India) Chiranth Vishwanath	TVS	Ret	2^{F}	5	DNS	6	5	5	6	5	6	6	6	114
6	(Australia) Hunter Corney	TVS	6^{F}	8	6	5	5	8	6	5					79
7	(Philippines) Leeandro Paredes	TVS	14	10	13	8	10	11	11	10	8	11	9	10	67
8	(Indonesia) Rendi Odding	TVS	11	11	11	6	13	10	3	4	DNS	DNS			63
9	(South Korea) Kim Min Jae	TVS	8	7	8	DNS	9	9	12	13			8	8	62
10	(Malaysia) Haziq Fairues	TVS	7	6	WD	WD					6	5	5	Ret	51
11	(New Zealand) Nixon Frost	TVS			14	9	11	12	Ret	12	10	7	12	11	46
12	(Thailand) Kanatat Jaiman	TVS	10	12	10	DNS					Ret	9	7	4	45
13	(Thailand) Atih Kanghair	TVS	4	4	7	7									44
14	(India) Rakshith Shihari	TVS							8	8			10	7	31
15	(United Kingdom) Harley McCabe	TVS							9	9	7	8			31
16	(India) KY Ahamed	TVS	12	Ret	12	DNS							11	9	20
17	(Japan) Riku Matsushima	TVS					7	6							19
18	(Indonesia) Decksa Alfarezel	TVS							7	7					18
19	(Japan) Shingo Iidaka	TVS					8	7							17
20	(Singapore) Arsyad Rusydi	TVS	13	9	9	DNS									17
21	(Colombia) Jhon A Lopez	TVS											13	5	14
22	(Australia) Jed Louis	TVS									11	10			11
23	(Indonesia) Rama Putra	TVS							10	11					11
24	(India) Senthilkumar Chandrasekaran	TVS	9	13											10
25	(Malaysia) Hafiza Rofa	TVS									9	Ret			7
26	(India) Alwin Sundar	TVS					12	Ret							4
	(South Africa) Oratilwe Phiri	TVS											Ret	Ret	0
	(Malaysia) Farish Hafiy	TVS					Ret	DNS							0
	(Thailand) Vorapong Malahuan	TVS	WD	WD	WD	WD	WD	WD	WD	WD			WD	WD	

Colour	Result
Gold	Winner
Silver	Second place
Bronze	Third place
Green	Points classification
Blue	Non-points classification
Blue	Non-classified finish (NC)
Purple	Retired, not classified (Ret)
Red	Did not qualify (DNQ)
Red	Did not pre-qualify (DNPQ)
Black	Disqualified (DSQ)
White	Did not start (DNS)
White	Withdrew (WD)
White	Race cancelled (C)
Blank	Did not practice (DNP)
Blank	Did not arrive (DNA)
Blank	Excluded (EX)

P – Pole position
F – Fastest lap
