= Mandalika International Street Circuit =

Racing circuit in Indonesia

Pertamina Mandalika International Street Circuit

- Grand Prix Circuit (2021–present)
- Location: Central Lombok Regency, West Nusa Tenggara, Indonesia
- Coordinates: 8°53′43″S 116°18′21″E
- Capacity: 195,700
- FIA Grade: 3
- Owner: Indonesia Tourism Development Corporation (2022–2026); Pertamina (2026–)
- Operator: Mandalika Grand Prix Association
- Broke ground: October 2019; 7 years ago
- Opened: 12 November 2021; 4 years ago
- Architect: Mrk1 Consulting; Populous; Driven International; Jarno Zaffelli
- Major events: Current: Grand Prix motorcycle racing Indonesian motorcycle Grand Prix (2022–present); GT World Challenge Asia (2025–2026); Asia Road Racing Championship (2023–present); Moto4 Asia Cup (2021–present); Former: Porsche Carrera Cup Asia (2025); World SBK (2021–2023)
- Website: The Mandalika GP

Grand Prix Circuit (2021–present)
- Surface: Asphalt
- Length: 4.301 km (2.673 mi)
- Turns: 17
- Race lap record: 1:28.486 ( (China) Deng Yi, Ferrari 296 GT3, 2026, GT3)

Mandalika International Street Circuit (known as Pertamina Mandalika International Street Circuit for commercial purposes) is a motorsports race track located in the Mandalika resort area on Lombok island, part of the West Nusa Tenggara province of Indonesia. The circuit opened by hosting rounds of the Asia Talent Cup and Superbike World Championship in late 2021, followed by Grand Prix motorcycle races in 2022.

The sports cluster and entertainment project, measuring 120 hectares, is expected to include the construction of hotels and other facilities. As a purposely-constructed racing track with wide run-off areas, it is claimed to be a street circuit as parts may be used in future, allowing normal traffic access to new resort facilities.

== Development area ==
As part of the conservation maintenance, the vegetation that provides the backdrop to the Mandalika Resort area will be set aside as a conservation area of over 3,000 hectares. This area with many native species will only be accessible for low-impact activities, such as cycling or hiking to minimize damage to the flora and fauna.

== History ==
=== Planning ===
Previously, Indonesia had held World Championship racing in 1996 and 1997 as well as the Superbike from 1994 to 1997, all at the Sentul International Circuit in Bogor, West Java near the nation's capital of Jakarta. However, due to the financial crisis, Indonesia was forced to suspend its motorsport hosting program. This circuit was built to increase the number of tourists who come to the Mandalika resort area and introduce new tourist destinations.

In late 2016, Indonesia Tourism Development Corporation (ITDC) obtained the Land Management Rights certificate to build the Mandalika circuit from the National Land Agency. In January 2017, managing director of Mrk1 Consulting, Mark Hughes, made an initial sketch of the circuit layout in Lombok. On 20 January 2017, a memorandum of understanding was signed between ITDC and Roadgrip Motorsports. In November 2017, Vinci Grand Construction Projects signed a contract to build a MotoGP circuit in Mandalika Special Economic Zone, Lombok with an investment value of 6.5 trillion Rupiah. The construction of the circuit was expected to take 2 years, starting in 2018, however the circuit was not built until 2019. The infrastructure development of Mandalika SEZ, which includes the Mandalika circuit, is planned to take 3.6 trillion Rupiah. According to ITDC's Director of Construction and Operations, Ngurah Wirawan, funds will be obtained from Asian Infrastructure Investment Bank (AIIB) loans in stages until 2023. For 2019 disbursement, there are 2 packages worth 900 billion and 700 billion. The target completion date is June 2020.

=== Public announcement and progress ===
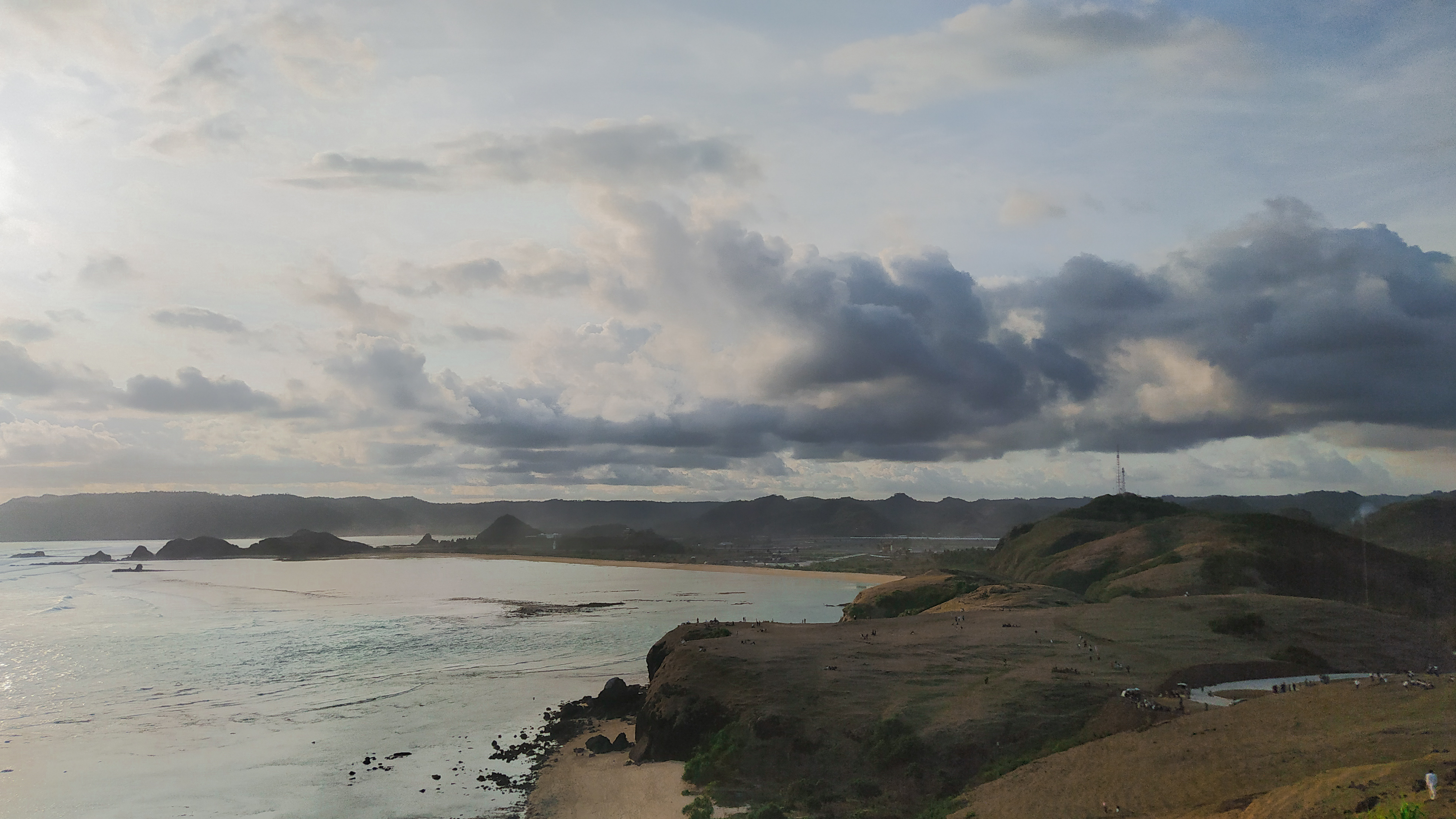
Mandalika Circuit viewed from Merese Hill

On 23 February 2019, it was announced that the circuit would host the returning Indonesian motorcycle Grand Prix in 2022. The track has 4.301 km (2.673 mi) length with 17 corners.

In February 2019, ITDC CEO Abdulbar M. Mansoer confirmed that the circuit would host MotoGP for 3 seasons, from 2021 to 2023. However, MotoGP was cancelled in 2021 due to the COVID-19 pandemic and postponed to 2022. The Indonesian motorcycle Grand Prix was held in 2022, after the Qatar Grand Prix, as the second round of the season. The circuit is also the venue for the 2022 MotoGP pre–season test, from 11 to 13 February 2022. In addition to MotoGP, the circuit is also planned to hold the Superbike World Championship and the Asia Talent Cup. The Superbike Championship was originally planned for 12–14 November 2021, but was postponed to 19–21 November so as not to clash with the MotoGP provisional schedule. The first race of the Asia Talent Cup, which was originally planned for 14 November, was also postponed to 19 November due to a shortage of marshals on duty.

Pertamina spent US$7 million or around IDR 100 billion for the naming rights and also became the main sponsor of the Mandalika circuit. Thus the circuit is renamed to the Pertamina Mandalika International Street Circuit. This contract is valid until the end of 2022.

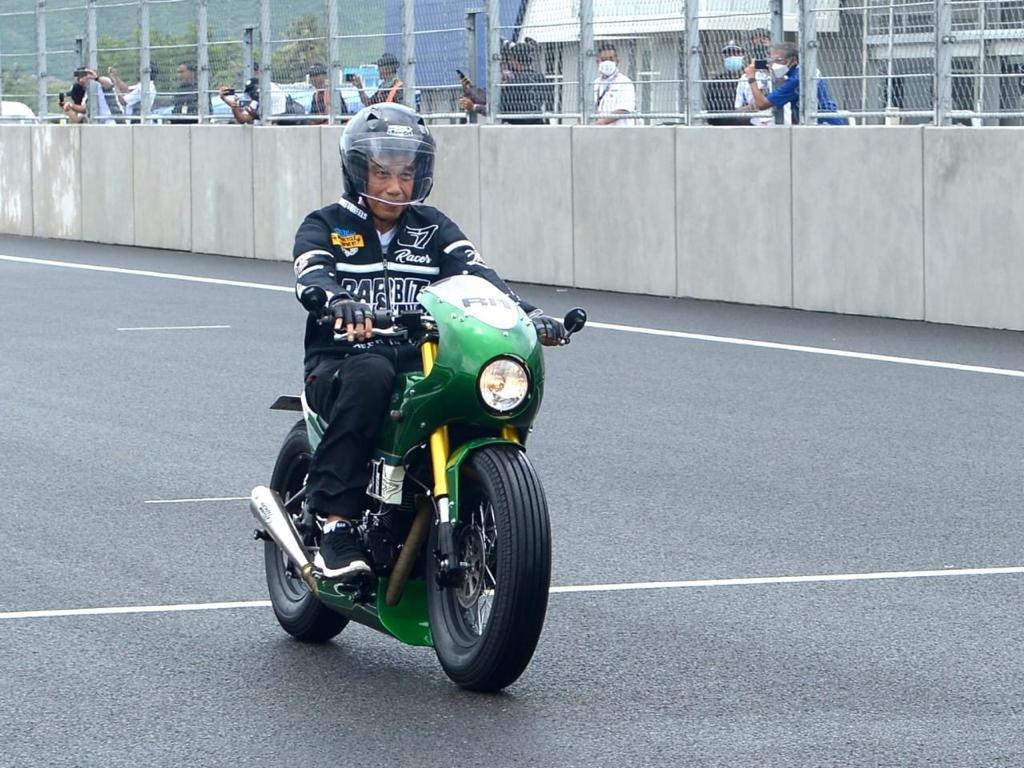
President Joko Widodo tests the Mandalika Circuit track on 12 November 2021

On 12 November 2021, the President of Indonesia, Joko Widodo, inaugurated the Mandalika International Circuit. He then did a lap around the race track. The inauguration took place ahead of the Asia Talent Cup race which was held two days later.

On 16 November 2021, the Mandalika Grand Prix Association (MGPA) was formed as a business unit of ITDC to manage and operate the Mandalika circuit.

On 19 November, after the free practice session of the World Superbike Indonesia round, several riders highlighted the dirty track surface. Jonathan Rea said that the Mandalika Circuit was a little dirty, especially outside the race line. But other riders, such as Scott Redding, Leon Haslam, and Michael van der Mark, thought it was normal for a new track.

On 21 December, it was announced that Mandalika Circuit would host the final round of GT World Challenge Asia for the 2022 season on 21–23 October 2022. However, the race was cancelled in 2022 because Mandalika Circuit has not yet been homologated as a car racing circuit by the FIA. GT World Challenge Asia Championship Director, Benjamin Franassovici, said that the issue will be resolved so that they have "the option to race there next year".

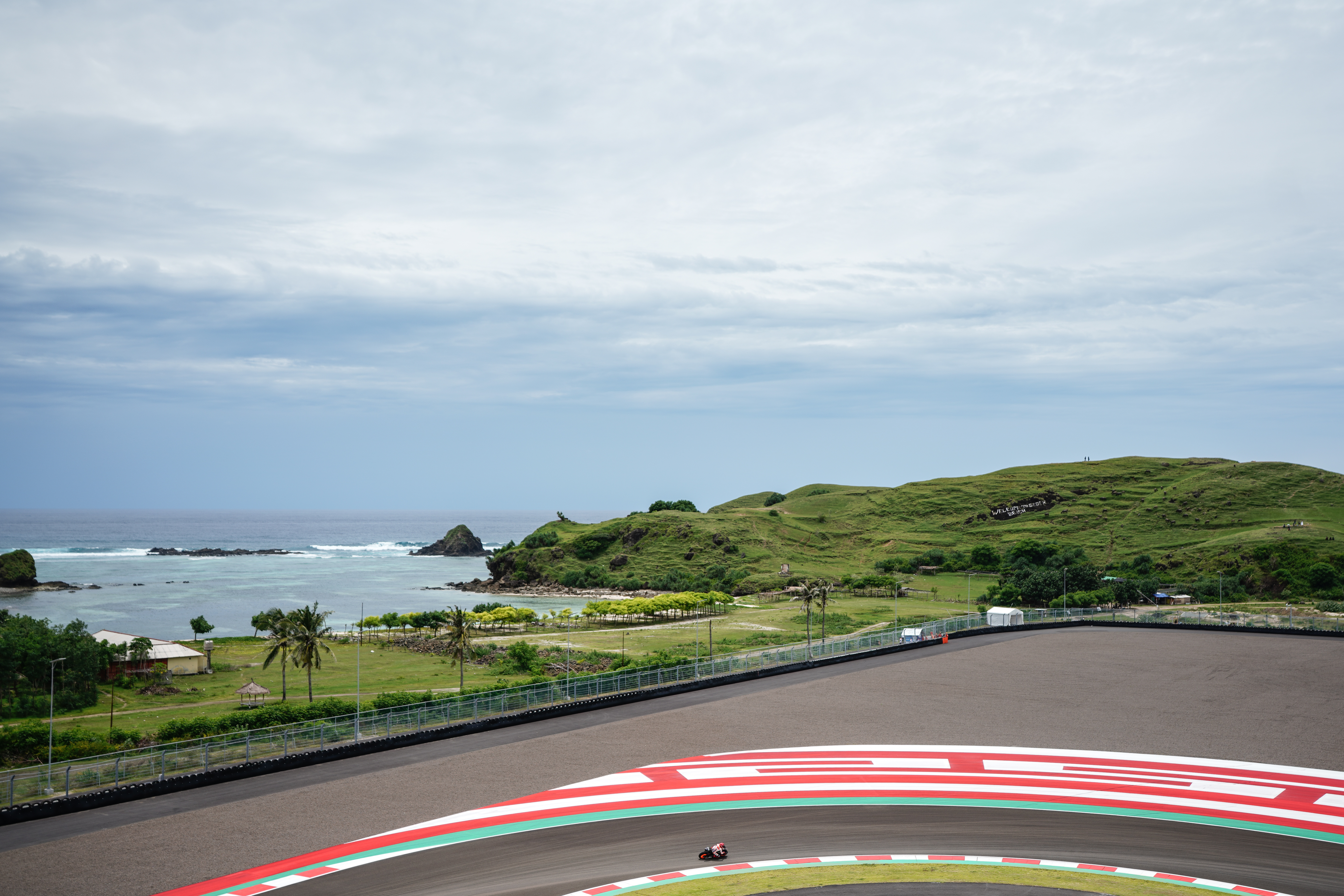
Marc Márquez rounds turn 10 of Mandalika International Circuit during the pre-season test, February 2022

At the 2022 MotoGP pre-season test, held from 11 to 13 February 2022, the riders revealed some issues with the gravel and tarmac areas of the circuit. Pramac Racing team rider Jorge Martin found the gravel outside the track area "too sharp" and "painful". He said this after falling into the gravel area between Turns 10 and 11. The dirty condition of the circuit was also complained about by riders such as Aleix Espargaro, Andrea Dovizioso, Alex Rins, and Francesco Bagnaia. The problem resulted in the suspension of the first day's test session for several hours for cleaning. The FIM, Dorna Sports, and MGPA considered the dirty circuit to be caused by heavy rainfall the night before. However, as reported by The Race, the dust and gravel on the track was chipped and crushed asphalt material due to the type of aggregate that was finer than the specified specifications, and because it was not prepared and used properly. This was confirmed by Chaz Davies, a WSBK driver who raced at Mandalika in November 2021. Two days later, it was announced that the circuit surface would be repaved, from before turn 17 to after turn 5. The repaving process was completed on 9 March 2022, seven days before the scheduled first motorcycle grands prix on 20 March 2022. According to Campbell Wadell, the engineer involved in the repaving of the Mandalika circuit from asphalt surface specialist company R3, the circuit should still require a full repaving. The circuit was FIM inspected in 2022 obtaining 'A' grade, allowing for MotoGP series events to be run. Previously, it was graded as 'B' at the time of the World Superbike event in November 2021.

Though, during practice for the motorcycle grand prix race weekend in March 2022, new holes began to appear in the resurfaced part of the track, causing both the Moto2 and MotoGP races to be were shortened. Additionally, the MotoGP race was delayed by heavy rain, until the rain abated coinciding with the presence of a shaman flown in for the purpose of repelling the rain. Riders were hit by flying stones, and many stated the surface would need to be resurfaced before the next year's event.

== Controversies and land disputes ==
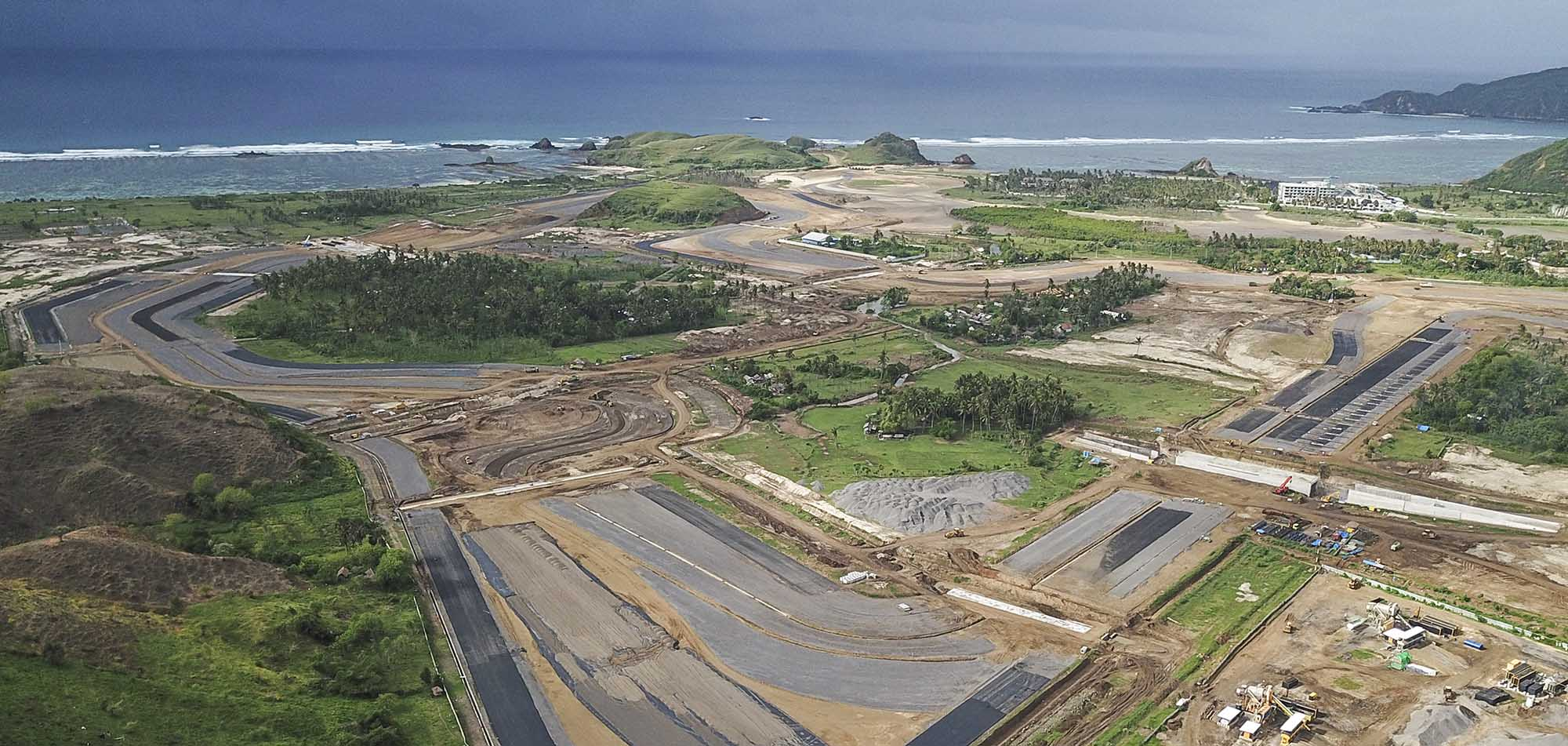
Development of Mandalika International Circuit as of December 2020

On 24 October 2016, Gema Lazuardi's 60-acre land was promised to be purchased by ITDC for 44,650,000 per acre, or a total of 2.7 billion. However, in February 2020, he was sued by ITDC for using the land without permission. The panel of judges at the Praya District Court sentenced him to two months in prison with six months probation. After filing an appeal, Gema Lazuardi won the criminal case. Another resident, Masrup, also lost his 1.6 hectares of land. His land was executed despite being found innocent in court, after being charged with criminal offences for encroaching on his own land.

The project was then heavily criticised by the United Nations, due to reports of local ethnic Sasak people being dispossessed of their homes, lands and livelihoods. In April 2019, the United Nations Human Rights Council released a report on human rights violations that occurred during the construction of the circuit, chronicling the Mandalika construction, and explanations and clarifications surrounding it. This came after reports of local residents being forced to leave their homes and land. However, the government has dismissed the UN's claims as a "false and hyperbolic narrative." The government has also promised to be transparent and recommended payment of compensation and dialogue between residents and ITDC.

In late September 2019, dozens of residents from two hamlets blocked heavy equipment and fenced off the Mandalika circuit construction area, triggered by a land dispute between residents and ITDC. The action continued until early October.

In October 2021, there was a hamlet stuck in the middle of the circuit, to the right of the 5th to 8th corners. There were only two ways out, from two different tunnels. At the time, a combination of a rudimentary drainage system and rain created a chest-deep puddle in the tunnel, cutting off access to and from the neighbourhood for a week. The issue has since been resolved and the residents are willing to be relocated.

In November 2021, a video circulated showing the checking of Ducati's racing motorbike in the paddock area of the Mandalika Circuit. The video became a topic of conversation because motorbike checks can only be carried out by customs and the racing team. A few days later, Mataram Customs stated that the check was supervised by them. However, customs denied that the video was taken by them. Although reportedly "outraged", Ducati stated that they never gave any statement regarding this case. In addition, MGPA has also tightened access to the pit lane to prevent unauthorised entry.

On 16 November 2021, MGPA Chief Operating Officer Dyan Dilato was sacked after making "derogatory" remarks to marshals at the Mandalika Circuit. He said the marshals were unprofessional for "choosing to watch the race rather than be on duty".

In early December 2021, a freestyle video circulated on the Mandalika circuit that sparked criticism. According to ITDC Corporate Communication Senior, Esther D Ginting, the video was part of making a promotional video: "We state that the action was part of the shooting process for the production of a promotional video of the circuit for the MGPA and ITDC which was carried out by our partner, PT Roadgrip Motorsport Indonesia (RMI)."

The Asia Talent Cup (ATC) races intended for 12–14 November 2021 as a shakedown run were postponed due to organisational "challenges" that needed to be overcome before the following weekend races of 20–21, when it was intended to run the ATC together with the last 2021 World Superbike event. The difficulties were reported as a shortage of track marshals resulting in unacceptably low competitor safety levels.

During the MotoGP series pre-season machine testing in early 2022, Indonesian press reported that local landowners had not been paid for their land taken by the Indonesian government to create the circuit, due to 'Konsinyasi', meaning that disputes over purchase prices could leave them without the land and without the money they are owed. Until February 2022, the 3.5 hectares of land that became the 9th corner of the Mandalika Circuit was still in dispute. The land owned by the residents has not been paid by ITDC. ITDC through a press conference denied this. It is known that of the 12 Mandalika circuit land dispute cases, only 2 have been processed.

== Layout ==
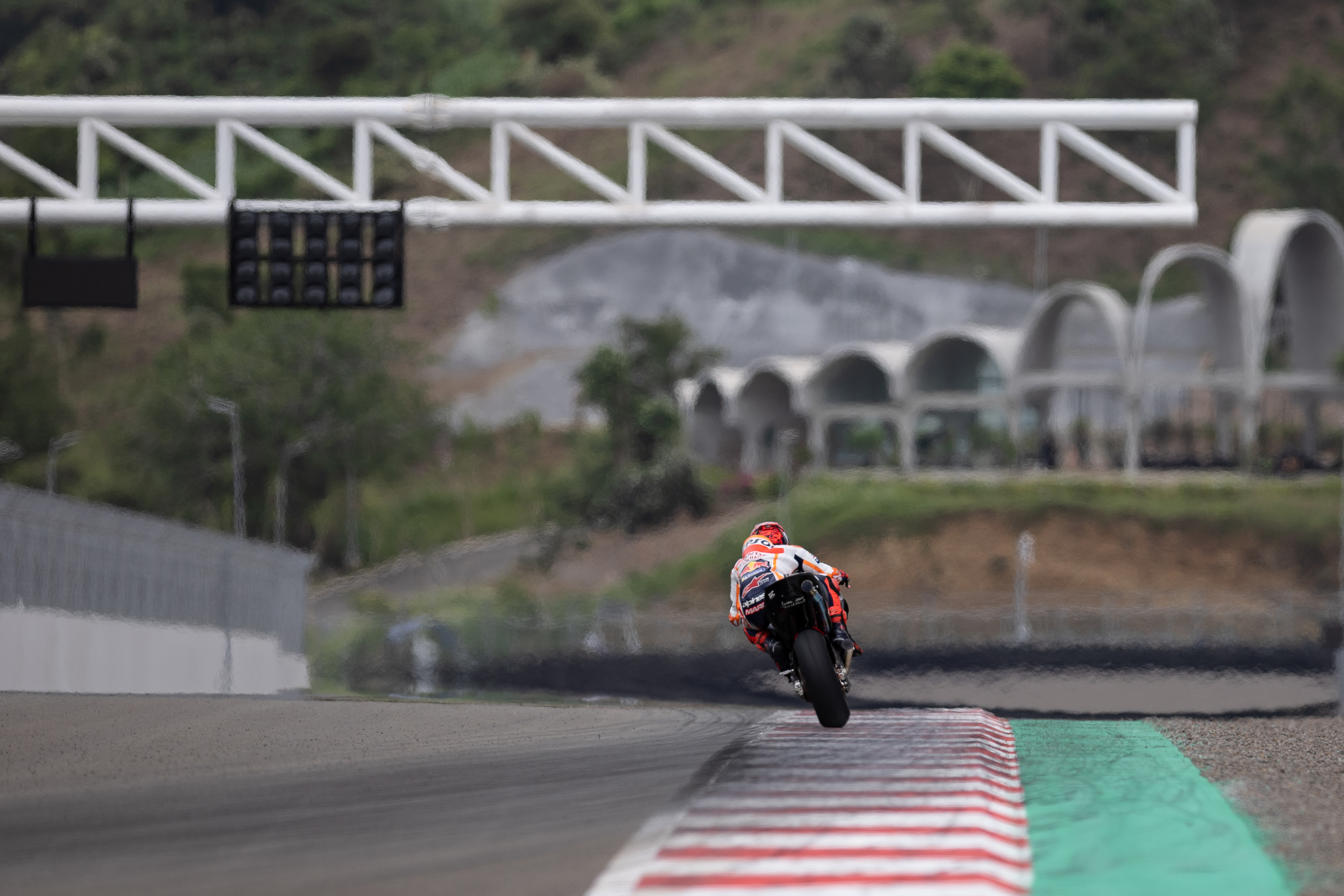
Marc Márquez on the start and finish straight of Mandalika International Circuit

As a purpose-built circuit with a large run-off area, Mandalika Circuit is claimed to be a street circuit concept, where the circuit will be open to the public when not holding races. Although it is open to the public, only the outer street track of the circuit is accessible, not the main track of the circuit. However, until March 2023, the outer roadways of the circuit will not be open to the public, considering there is no urgency.

The main circuit, normally raced in 4.301 km (2.673 mi) long. Repsol Honda racer, Marc Márquez, said that the Mandalika Circuit has a simple layout. However, he believes the race there will be very entertaining. "This is a simple circuit in terms of layout, but the conditions make it interesting. There is only one line to overtake," he said.

Despite the difficult track conditions, the layout was met with praise from riders, with Honda's Pol Espargaró noting that "it has its own character." "The track is nice. It has a little bit of everything," said Espargaró.

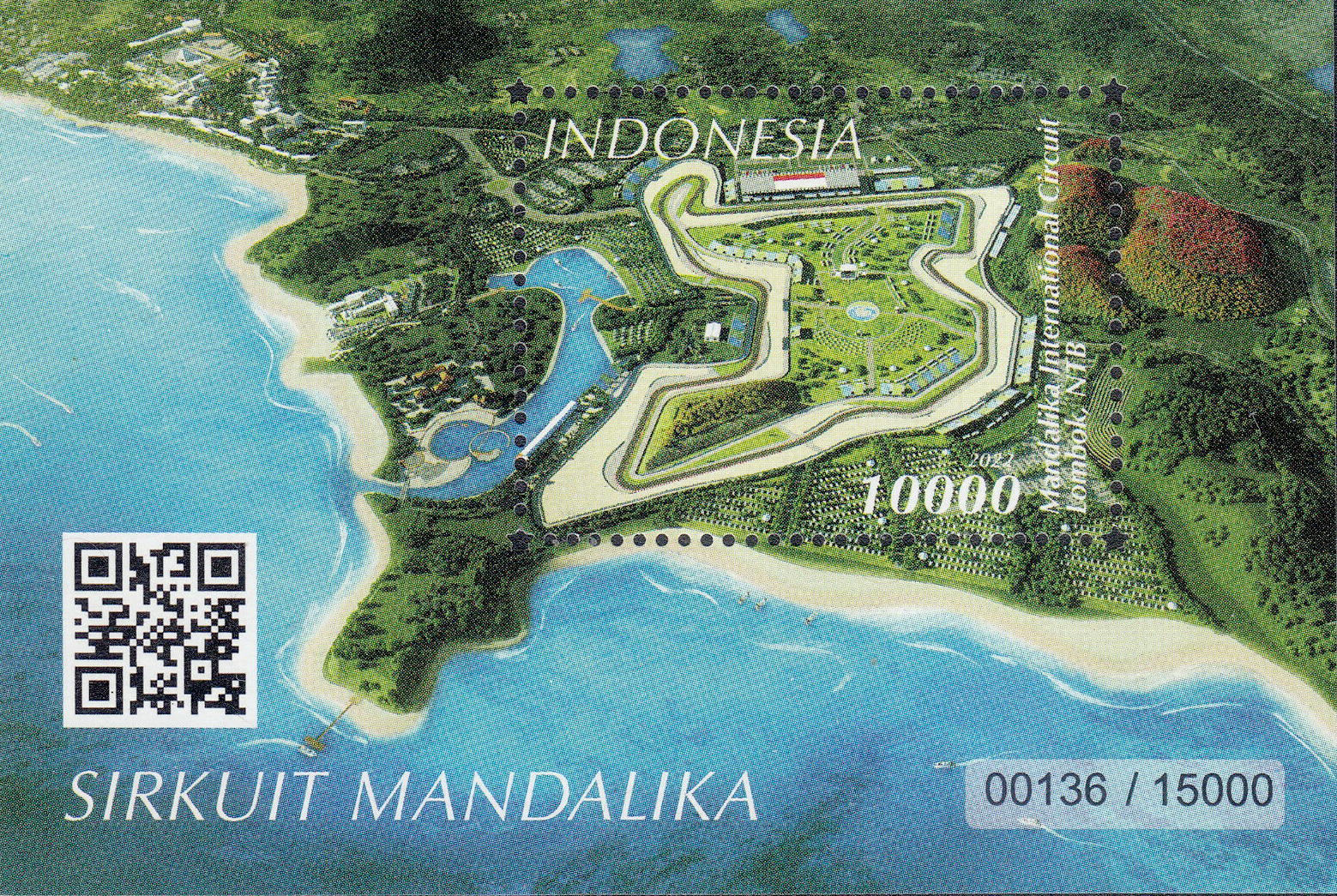
Mandalika International Street Circuit on a 2022 stamp sheet of Indonesia

The circuit was initially rumoured to be 4.8 km long, but was changed to 4.32 km with 19 bends. The circuit design was then shortened again to 4.31 km with 17 bends. According to Ricky Baheramsjah, CEO of Mandalika Grand Prix Association, the corners were reduced and replaced with a straight track due to safety factors and to "add overtaking action." In addition, the previous circuit design was also considered "more favourable to one of the manufacturer". The surface of the Mandalika circuit uses a rougher Stone Mastic Asphalt (SMA) type asphalt that is expected to strengthen tyre grip.

At the time of the inauguration, the circuit was 4.301 km long with 17 corners, with a capacity of 50,000 seats in the grandstand and a total of 195,700 people. The Mandalika Circuit pit building, which spans 350 metres, has two floors (some three floors) with a capacity of 50 garages. The pit building can be converted into a conference centre when not holding races. There is a modular medical centre building 100 metres from race control, equipped with three helipads. On 18 March 2022, the circuit was homologated FIM grade A.

In March 2022, the designer of the circuit tweeted that he first configured the track layout at a beachside hotel on a visit to Lombok five years earlier.

== Events ==
Current

- January: Pertamina 6 Hours Endurance
- April: Mandalika Racing Series
- May: GT World Challenge Asia, Mandalika Festival of Speed
- June: Mandalika Racing Series, Mandalika Festival of Speed
- July: Mandalika Racing Series
- August: Asia Road Racing Championship, Mandalika Racing Series, Mandalika Festival of Speed
- October: MotoGP Indonesian motorcycle Grand Prix, Moto4 Asia Cup, Mandalika Festival of Speed
- November: Mandalika Racing Series

Former

- Porsche Carrera Cup Asia (2025)
- Superbike World Championship (2021–2023)
- Supersport World Championship (2021–2023)

== Lap records ==
As of October 2026, the fastest official race lap records at the Mandalika International Street Circuit are listed as:

Category	Time	Driver	Vehicle	Event
Grand Prix Circuit (2021–present): 4.301 km (2.673 mi)
GT3	1:28.486	Deng Yi	Ferrari 296 GT3	2026 Mandalika GT World Challenge Asia round
MotoGP	1:29.960	Marco Bezzecchi	Aprilia RS-GP26	2026 Indonesian motorcycle Grand Prix
World SBK	1:32.163	Toprak Razgatlıoğlu	Yamaha YZF-R1	2022 Mandalika World SBK round
Porsche Carrera Cup	1:32.397	Dylan Pereira	Porsche 911 (992 I) GT3 Cup	2025 Mandalika Porsche Carrera Cup Asia round
Moto2	1:32.497	Álex Escrig	Forward F2	2026 Indonesian motorcycle Grand Prix
World SSP	1:35.416	Stefano Manzi	Yamaha YZF-R6	2023 Mandalika World SSP round
Moto3	1:37.189	Matteo Bertelle	KTM RC250GP	2026 Indonesian motorcycle Grand Prix
TCR Touring Car	1:40.161	Umar Abdullah	Honda Civic Type R TCR (FL5)	2023 Mandalika Porsche Sprint Challenge Indonesia TCR Exhibition Race
GT4	1:41.839	Aditya Tania	Porsche 718 Cayman GT4 Clubsport	2026 1st Mandalika Superstars Sportscar Series round
Supersport 300	1:46.093	Danial Syahmi	Yamaha YZF-R3	2025 Mandalika ARRC round
250cc	1:47.751	Rheza Ahrens	Honda CBR250RR	2023 1st Mandalika Racing Series round
Asia Underbone 150	1:54.321	Fahmi Basam	Yamaha MX King 150	2024 Mandalika ARRC round

== Grand Prix motorcycle racing winners ==
Premier Grand Prix Winner	Race won	Season
(Portugal) Miguel Oliveira	1	2022
(Italy) Francesco Bagnaia	1	2023
(Spain) Jorge Martín	1	2024
(Spain) Fermín Aldeguer	1	2025
(Italy) Marco Bezzecchi	1	2026

Season	Class	Winning rider	Team	Bike	Best lap time	Top speed
2022	MotoGP	(Portugal) Miguel Oliveira	Red Bull KTM Factory Racing	KTM RC16	1:38.749	298.3 km/h (185.4 mph)
2022	Moto2	(Thailand) Somkiat Chantra	Idemitsu Honda Team Asia	Kalex Moto2	1:35.591	250.0 km/h (155.3 mph)
2022	Moto3	(Italy) Dennis Foggia	Leopard Racing	Honda NSF250RW	1:40.197	211.3 km/h (131.3 mph)
2023	MotoGP	(Italy) Francesco Bagnaia	Ducati Lenovo Team	Ducati Desmosedici GP23	1:30.906	314.8 km/h (195.6 mph)
2023	Moto2	(Spain) Pedro Acosta	Red Bull KTM Ajo	Kalex Moto2	1:34.420	261.5 km/h (162.5 mph)
2023	Moto3	(Brazil) Diogo Moreira	MT Helmets – MSi	KTM RC250GP	1:38.936	220.8 km/h (137.2 mph)
2024	MotoGP	(Spain) Jorge Martín	Prima Pramac Racing	Ducati Desmosedici GP24	1:30.539	314.8 km/h (195.6 mph)
2024	Moto2	(Spain) Arón Canet	Fantic Racing	Kalex Moto2	1:33.840	255.3 km/h (158.6 mph)
2024	Moto3	(Colombia) David Alonso	CFMoto Aspar Team	CFMoto Moto3	1:37.936	222.2 km/h (138.1 mph)
2025	MotoGP	(Spain) Fermín Aldeguer	BK8 Gresini Racing MotoGP	Ducati Desmosedici GP24	1:30.499	313.9 km/h (195.0 mph)
2025	Moto2	(Brazil) Diogo Moreira	Italtrans Racing Team	Kalex Moto2	1:33.164	255.3 km/h (158.6 mph)
2025	Moto3	(Spain) José Antonio Rueda	Red Bull KTM Ajo	KTM RC250GP	1:37.255	223.6 km/h (138.9 mph)
2026	MotoGP	(Italy) Marco Bezzecchi	Aprilia Racing	Aprilia RS-GP	1:29.960	319.5 km/h (198.5 mph)
2026	Moto2	(Spain) Izan Guevara	Blu Cru Pramac Yamaha Moto2	Boscoscuro B-26	1:32.497	259 km/h (161 mph)
2026	Moto3	(Spain) Máximo Quiles	CFMoto Aspar Team	KTM RC250GP	1:37.189	218 km/h (135 mph)

== Other events winners ==
=== World Superbike Championship ===
==== WorldSBK ====
Year	Race	Winning rider	Team	Bike
2021	Race 1	(United Kingdom) Jonathan Rea	Kawasaki Racing Team WorldSBK	Kawasaki Ninja ZX-10RR
2021	Superpole Race	Cancelled		
2021	Race 2	(United Kingdom) Jonathan Rea	Kawasaki Racing Team WorldSBK	Kawasaki Ninja ZX-10RR
2022	Race 1	(Turkey) Toprak Razgatlıoğlu	Pata Yamaha with Brixx WorldSBK	Yamaha YZF-R1
2022	Superpole Race	(Turkey) Toprak Razgatlıoğlu	Pata Yamaha with Brixx WorldSBK	Yamaha YZF-R1
2022	Race 2	(Turkey) Toprak Razgatlıoğlu	Pata Yamaha with Brixx WorldSBK	Yamaha YZF-R1
2023	Race 1	(Spain) Álvaro Bautista	Aruba.it Racing – Ducati	Ducati Panigale V4 R
2023	Superpole Race	(Turkey) Toprak Razgatlıoğlu	Pata Yamaha Prometeon WorldSBK	Yamaha YZF-R1
2023	Race 2	(Spain) Álvaro Bautista	Aruba.it Racing – Ducati	Ducati Panigale V4 R

==== WorldSSP ====
Year	Race	Winning rider	Team	Bike
2021	Race 1	(Italy) Raffaele De Rosa	Orelac Racing VerdNatura	Kawasaki Ninja ZX-6R
2021	Race 2	(France) Jules Cluzel	GMT94 Yamaha	Yamaha YZF-R6
2022	Race 1	(Finland) Niki Tuuli	MV Agusta Reparto Corse	MV Agusta F3 800 RR
2022	Race 2	(Switzerland) Dominique Aegerter	Ten Kate Racing Yamaha	Yamaha YZF-R6
2023	Race 1	(Turkey) Can Öncü	Kawasaki Puccetti Racing	Kawasaki Ninja ZX-6R
2023	Race 2	(Italy) Federico Caricasulo	Althea Racing	Ducati Panigale V2

=== Feeder event ===
==== Moto4 Asia Cup / Asia Talent Cup ====
Year	Race	Winning rider	Bike
2021	INA1	(Japan) Taiyo Furusato	Honda
2021	INA2	(Japan) Taiyo Furusato	Honda
2021	WSBK1	(Japan) Taiyo Furusato	Honda
2021	WSBK2	Cancelled	
2022	INA1	(Malaysia) Hakim Danish	Honda
2022	INA2	(Malaysia) Hakim Danish	Honda
2022	WSBK1	(Indonesia) Veda Ega Pratama	Honda
2022	WSBK2	(Indonesia) Veda Ega Pratama	Honda
2023	INA1	(Indonesia) Veda Ega Pratama	Honda
2023	INA2	(Indonesia) Veda Ega Pratama	Honda
2024	INA1	(Japan) Zen Mitani	Honda
2024	INA2	(Japan) Ryota Ogiwara	Honda
2025	INA1	(Philippines) Alfonsi Daquigan	Honda
2025	INA2	(Philippines) Alfonsi Daquigan	Honda
2026	INA1	(Japan) Hayato Chishiki	Honda
2026	INA2	(Japan) Kotaro Togashi	Honda

== Fatalities ==
- Haruki Noguchi – 2023 Mandalika Asia Road Racing Championship round

== See also ==
- Indonesian motorcycle Grand Prix
- List of motor racing tracks in Asia
