= Yamaha T135 =

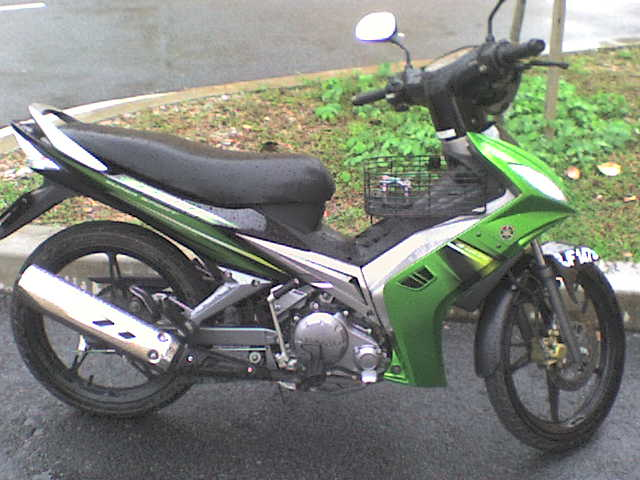
- Yamaha 135LC FI (Malaysia)
- Manufacturer: Yamaha Motor Company
- Also called: Yamaha Spark 135/135i (Thailand); Yamaha Exciter 135 (Vietnam); Yamaha Sniper/MX 135 (Philippines); Yamaha Jupiter MX (Indonesia); Yamaha 135LC (Malaysia); Yamaha Crypton X 135 (Greece)
- Parent company: Yamaha Corporation
- Production: 2005–present; 2005–2014 (Vietnam)
- Successor: Yamaha T-150
- Class: Underbone
- Engine: 135 cc (8.2 cu in) liquid-cooled 4-stroke 4-valve SOHC single-cylinder
- Bore / stroke: 54.0 mm × 58.7 mm (2.13 in × 2.31 in)
- Compression ratio: 10.9:1
- Ignition type: TCI
- Transmission: 4-speed constant mesh, automatic/manual clutch) (2005–present); 5-speed constant mesh, manual clutch (2011–2016)
- Frame type: Tubular steel diamond (underbone)
- Suspension: Front: telescopic fork Rear: Swingarm with monoshock
- Brakes: Front: Single-piston caliper with single disc/ Malaysia Dual-pistoncaliper with single disc (2011- 2016) Malaysia Single-piston caliper with single disc (2006-present); Rear: Drum (2005–present) only Malaysia for carburetor Yamaha Lc135 v7/ single-piston caliper with single disc (2011–2016) (2022-present) only Malaysia for Yamaha Lc135 FI 2022
- Wheelbase: 1,245 mm (49.0 in)
- Dimensions: L: 1,945 mm (76.6 in); W: 705 mm (27.8 in); H: 1,065 mm (41.9 in)
- Seat height: 770 mm (30 in)
- Weight: 109 kg (240.3 lb) (wet)
- Fuel capacity: 4.6 L (1.0 imp gal; 1.2 US gal)
- Oil capacity: 1.1 L (0.24 imp gal; 0.29 US gal)

The Yamaha T135 is an underbone manufactured by Yamaha Motor Company since 2005. It is known as the Spark 135/135i in Thailand, Sniper/MX 135 in the Philippines, Jupiter MX 135 LC in Indonesia, 135LC in Malaysia, Exciter 135 in Vietnam, and Crypton X 135 in Greece. It is powered by a 134.4 cc (8.20 cu in) single-cylinder engine.

The bike is succeeded by the 150 cc T-150 elsewhere except Malaysia, where both models are sold.

== Model history ==
=== 2005 ===
The T135 debuted in 2005 for the Thailand and Indonesian markets, and then the Malaysian market in February 2006. The model was very successful in Southeast Asia especially in Thailand.. To promote the T135, Yamaha organized a 9,000 km (5,600 mi) road tour of ASEAN countries in November 2005 through May 2006, passing through Thailand, Malaysia, Singapore, and the Philippines.

=== Malaysia ===
Two models of the T135 was sold in Malaysia, SuperSport (Auto Clutch N-1-2-3-4) and Extreme Spirit (Manual Clutch 1-N-2-3-4). The Extreme Spirit has some upgrades over the Supersport which were foldable footrest, blue tinted signal lens and taillamp, two piston caliper with 267mm brake disc and fork stabilizer. The fork dimensions were also different between the two models.

2006-2010 models were dubbed as V1. This model used Mikuni VM22 carburetor and the cutoff limit was 9500RPM.

2011-2013 models were dubbed as V2.

2014-2015 models were dubbed as V3

2016-2017 models were dubbed as V4

2017-2018 models were dubbed as V5

2018-2019 models were dubbed as V6

2020-2022 models were dubbed as V7

For 2023 (dubbed as V8) the model was upgraded with fuel injection instead of previous carburetor models.

=== 2008 ===
In 2008, the fuel injected version of the T135 was launched for the Thailand market (dubbed as Spark 135i), making it the second underbone motorcycle using fuel injection after the Honda's Wave 125i. There are 3 main Yamaha factories that assembled the T135. These are Indonesia, Thailand and newest is Philippines.

=== 2011 ===
In 2011, the T135 was facelifted with a new body design. The transmission of the Malaysia's and Indonesia's manual clutch variant was revised to 5-speed transmission from the previous 4-speed as an upgrade. Hong Leong Yamaha Malaysia manufactured a cut-off from the CDI which limits the motorcycle's performance for the facelifted version.

=== 2016 ===
In 2016, the manual clutch variant of the T135 was discontinued, as the T-150 made its debut. The automatic clutch variant is still sold.

=== 2019 ===
In September 2019 the YAMAHA 135LC SE was introduced, the real successor of the Spark 135 series. Although in many countries the Exciter/ Jupiter 150-155cc is seen as the successor this is virtual an other model. The engine and all main components are the same as previous models. A better secured keylock and new bodywork and dashboard are the main changes.

=== 2022 ===
The 2023 model received a redesign influenced by the larger T-150 and some other major upgrades such as new digital speedometer interface, larger basket with USB port, bigger fuel tank (4.6L) and rear brake no longer uses drum-brake system and is replaced with disc brake system instead.

== Vietnam ==
Yamaha Exciter 135 (as this bike was called) was first launched in 2005, but initially with a 125cc engine and a 4-speed manual transmission with an automatic clutch, sold in 2 versions: Standard and RC. A year later, Yamaha Vietnam updated the engine from 125cc to 135cc, transmission remained the same. In 2009, Yamaha Vietnam released a new version which had a manual clutch, called the Exciter GP. Yamaha sold it alongside the 2 initial versions. In 2011, Yamaha Exciter 135 received a major update, this time only available with a manual clutch version, a 5-speed manual transmission and rear disc brake (replaced the previous version's 4-speed manual transmission and rear drum brake). In 2014, almost 10 years after the initial launch, Yamaha Vietnam discontinued this bike and replace it with a brand new version, called Yamaha Exciter 150. However, in 2022, the new version of this bike was reportedly registered in Vietnam. It took lots of design reference from the facelifted Yamaha Exciter 135 Fi in Vietnam, but whether the bike will go on sale and the release date remains to be unknown.
