= 2025 Asia Talent Cup =

Motorcycle road racing season

2025 Asia Talent Cup
Previous:	2024	Next:	2026

The 2025 Idemitsu Asia Talent Cup was the eleventh running of the Asia Talent Cup, a motorcycle racing series organized by Dorna and sponsored by Idemitsu, which is intended for young riders throughout Asia and Oceania. The season featured six rounds at circuits in Asia, with all but the third round being held as support races for the MotoGP World Championship. The season commenced at Buriram on 28 February, and concluded at Sepang on 26 October. This was the final season of the competition under the Asia Talent Cup moniker, which was rebranded as the Moto4 Asia Cup from the 2026 season onwards.

On 18 August 2025, Dorna Sports released a shortlist of 83 riders from 18 different nationalities which had been selected to participate in the 2026 Selection Event. The event took place at the Sepang International Kart Circuit in Malaysia on 22 October 2025.

Japanese rider Ryota Ogiwara was crowned champion at the Sepang round.

== Entry list ==
The entry list of selected riders was released on 10 December 2024. All riders compete on identical 250cc Honda NSF250R motorcycles and use series-specified Pirelli tyres.

No.	Rider	Status	Rounds
2	(Japan) Haruki Matsuyama	R	All
3	(Indonesia) Alvaro Hetta Mahendra	R	All
5	(Thailand) Tanachat Pratumtong		All
6	(Malaysia) Muhriz Sharf	R	All
7	(Indonesia) Davino Britani	R	All
8	(South Korea) Kim Min-jae	R	All
9	(China) Chen Shiyu	R	All
10	(Thailand) Teerin Fleming (Note: Fleming was born in Australia but is competing under the flag of Thailand.)	R	All
11	(India) Sarthak Chavan		1–2, 4, 6
12	(Australia) Rikki Henry		1, 3
13	(Indonesia) Badly Ayatullah	R	1–5
14	(Japan) Seiryu Ikegami		All
15	(Australia) Archie Schmidt		1, 3–6
16	(Japan) Ryota Ogiwara		All
17	(Indonesia) Nelson Cairoli	R	All
18	(Vietnam) Nguyen Huu Tri	R	All
19	(Malaysia) Danial Adam	R	All
20	(Thailand) Noprutpong Bunprawes	R	All
21	(Japan) Shingo Iidaka	R	All
22	(Philippines) Alfonsi Daquigan		All
wildcard and/or replacement riders
24	(Thailand) Pancharuch Chitwirulchat		1–5
25	(Palestine) Mahdi Salem (Note: Salem was born in the United States but is competing under the flag of Palestine.)		2–3
26	(Australia) Bodie Paige		2, 5–6
27	(Japan) Rintaro Todaka		4
28	(United States) Kensei Matsudaira (Note: Matsudaira is of Japanese and Korean descent but races under the flag of the United States.)		4
29	(Indonesia) Rakha Bima		5
30	(Indonesia) Bintang Pranata		5–6

Icon	Status
R	Rookie

== Calendar and results ==
The definitive season calendar was revealed on 21 January 2025, and features six rounds in five countries.

Rnd.		Circuit	Date	Pole position	Fastest lap	Winning rider
1	1	(Thailand) Chang International Circuit, Buriram	1 March	(Japan) Seiryu Ikegami	(Japan) Seiryu Ikegami	(Japan) Ryota Ogiwara
1	2	(Thailand) Chang International Circuit, Buriram	2 March		(Japan) Haruki Matsuyama	(Japan) Ryota Ogiwara
2	3	(Qatar) Lusail International Circuit, Lusail	12 April	(Japan) Ryota Ogiwara	(Japan) Ryota Ogiwara	(Japan) Ryota Ogiwara
2	4	(Qatar) Lusail International Circuit, Lusail	13 April		(Japan) Seiryu Ikegami	(Japan) Ryota Ogiwara
3	5	(Malaysia) Sepang International Circuit, Sepang	3 August	(Japan) Ryota Ogiwara	(Japan) Ryota Ogiwara	(Japan) Ryota Ogiwara
3	6	(Malaysia) Sepang International Circuit, Sepang	3 August		(Japan) Ryota Ogiwara	(Japan) Ryota Ogiwara
4	7	(Japan) Mobility Resort Motegi, Motegi	27 September	(Japan) Seiryu Ikegami	(Japan) Seiryu Ikegami	(Japan) Ryota Ogiwara
4	8	(Japan) Mobility Resort Motegi, Motegi	28 September		(Japan) Seiryu Ikegami	(Japan) Ryota Ogiwara
5	9	(Indonesia) Mandalika International Street Circuit, Mandalika	4 October	(Japan) Haruki Matsuyama	(Philippines) Alfonsi Daquigan	(Philippines) Alfonsi Daquigan
5	10	(Indonesia) Mandalika International Street Circuit, Mandalika	5 October		(Japan) Ryota Ogiwara	(Philippines) Alfonsi Daquigan
6	11	(Malaysia) Sepang International Circuit, Sepang	25 October	(Japan) Ryota Ogiwara	(Japan) Seiryu Ikegami	(Japan) Seiryu Ikegami
6	12	(Malaysia) Sepang International Circuit, Sepang	26 October		(Indonesia) Bintang Pranata	(Thailand) Teerin Fleming

== Championship standings ==
Scoring system
Points are awarded to the top fifteen finishers. A rider has to finish the race to earn points.

Position	1st	2nd	3rd	4th	5th	6th	7th	8th	9th	10th	11th	12th	13th	14th	15th
Points	25	20	16	13	11	10	9	8	7	6	5	4	3	2	1

Pos.	Rider	THA (Thailand)		QAT (Qatar)		MAL (Malaysia)		JPN (Japan)		INA (Indonesia)		SEP (Malaysia)		Pts
Pos.	Rider	R1	R2	R1	R2	R1	R2	R1	R2	R1	R2	R1	R2	Pts
1	(Japan) Ryota Ogiwara	1	1	1^{P F}	1^{P}	1^{P F}	1^{P F}	1	1	Ret	6^{F}	2^{P}	2^{P}	250
2	(Japan) Seiryu Ikegami	2^{P F}	2^{P}	2	2^{F}	2	2	2^{P F}	2^{P F}	Ret	2	1^{F}	20	205
3	(Philippines) Alfonsi Daquigan	5	5	6	7	7	4	6	Ret	1^{F}	1	3	7	148
4	(Japan) Haruki Matsuyama	4	3^{F}	Ret	8	5	5	Ret	Ret	2^{P}	3^{P}	4	3	124
5	(Thailand) Noprutpong Bunprawes	3	4	7	4	4	8	Ret	9	6	4	5	9	120
6	(Japan) Shingo Iidaka	12	8	3	3	6	Ret	5	3	3	5	Ret	6	118
7	(Thailand) Teerin Fleming	10	11	5	5	14	Ret	9	6	5	Ret	7	1	97
8	(Indonesia) Badly Ayatullah	6	Ret	4	6	3	3	3	4	DNS	DNS			94
9	(Australia) Archie Schmidt	Ret	10			8	7	4	5	9	8	8	8	78
10	(Indonesia) Davino Britani	DNS	Ret	10	11	11	10	10	8	4	Ret	9	12	60
11	(Thailand) Tanachat Pratumtong	9	6	Ret	16	12	9	13	10	8	9	14	10	60
12	(Australia) Bodie Paige			9	9					7	7	Ret	5	43
13	(Thailand) Pancharuch Chitwirulchat	Ret	Ret	8	12	10	6	8	15	16	14			39
14	(India) Sarthak Chavan	7	9	11	Ret			12	12			12	15	34
15	(Indonesia) Nelson Cairoli	8	7	Ret	13	19	15	17	16	12	10	Ret	14	33
16	(Malaysia) Muhriz Sharf	DNS	Ret	18	14	13	11	16	13	11	Ret	10	11	29
17	(Indonesia) Bintang Pranata									17	12	6	4^{F}	27
18	(South Korea) Kim Min-jae	13	14	12	15	17	16	15	14	13	11	13	18	24
19	(Indonesia) Alvaro Hetta Mahendra	DNS	16	13	18	Ret	18	14	11	10	Ret	16	13	19
20	(Palestine) Mahdi Salem			15	10	9	12							18
21	(Japan) Rintaro Todaka							11	7					14
22	(Vietnam) Nguyen Huu Tri	14	13	16	19	18	13	Ret	18	18	15	11	16	14
23	(Malaysia) Danial Adam	DNS	12	14	17	15	Ret	18	17	14	13	15	17	13
24	(United States) Kensei Matsudaira							7	Ret					9
25	(Australia) Rikki Henry	11	15			16	14							8
26	(China) Chen Shiyu	15	17	17	20	20	17	Ret	Ret	19	16	17	19	1
27	(Indonesia) Rakha Bima									15	Ret			1
Pos.	Rider	R1	R2	R1	R2	R1	R2	R1	R2	R1	R2	R1	R2	Pts
Pos.	Rider	THA (Thailand)		QAT (Qatar)		MAL (Malaysia)		JPN (Japan)		INA (Indonesia)		SEP (Malaysia)		Pts

== Season summary ==
The season opener was held at the Chang International Circuit, where Japanese Seiryu Ikegami, entering his second Cup season, set pole position ahead of compatriot Ryota Ogiwara, who faced his third Cup stint, and Thai home rider Noprutpong Bunprawes, in his first full-time season. Ogiwara claimed first place in Race 1 after a last-lap battle with Ikegami, while Bunprawes completed the podium in third. In Race 2, Ogiwara won again, ahead of Ikegami and Japanese rookie Haruki Matsuyama, following a late crash by Indonesian rookie Badly Ayatullah while he was leading the race.

The second round took place at the Lusail International Circuit. Ogiwara secured his first pole position of the season, with Ikegami and Matsuyama completing the first row. Race 1 was decided in the final corner after Ogiwara made a late overtake on Ikegami to take the win. Japanese rookie Shingo Iidaka finished in third place, just ahead of Ayatullah. For Race 2, Ogiwara and Ikegami pulled away once again and brought the battle down to the final corner, this time with Ogiwara ahead, who held off Ikegami and crossed the line in first place, claiming his fourth win in a row. Iidaka completed the podium for a second time.

The third round was held at the Sepang International Circuit, which is also set to host the final round of the season. Ogiwara claimed his second pole position, with Ikegami and Iidaka completing the front row. In Race 1, Ogiwara quickly pulled away and formed a gap which would lead him to win his fifth race, finishing 9.463 seconds ahead of Ikegami, who fended off Ayatullah for second. Race 2 had a five-rider battle for the win down to the final corner, where Ogiwara once again emerged in front for a sixth time in a row in the season. Ikegami finished second for the sixth consecutive time, just in front of Ayatullah. Daquigan and Matsuyama missed out on the podium spots.

The fourth round of the season was held at Twin Ring Motegi. Ikegami set the fastest lap time in Qualifying Practice, ahead of Ogiwara and Matsuyama. In Race 1, Ikegami and Ogiwara broke away early, with Ogiwara ultimately edging out Ikegami by just 0.015 seconds. Ayatullah completed the podium ahead or Schmidt and Iidaka. Race 2 followed a similar pattern, with Ogiwara once again finishing just ahead of Ikegami, breaking the record for the most consecutive wins in the Cup (8), previously set by Taiyo Furusato in 2021. Iidaka held off Ayatullah and Schmidt for third place.

The fifth round of the season took place at the Mandalika International Circuit. Rookie Matsuyama secured his first Cup pole position, ahead of championship contenders Ikegami and Ogiwara. In Race 1, a multi-rider group formed at the front, with Daquigan briefly pulling away in the early laps, who would later serve a double Long Lap Penalty and consequently drop down to 13th place. The lead changed hands multiple times throughout the race, with Ikegami leading into the final two corners. Ogiwara dived into the inside of Turn 16, couldn't get the bike stopped and allowed Ikegami to regain the lead into the final corner. In a late attempt for the win, Ogiwara went for the inside again at Turn 17, but collected Ikegami in the process, making both retire from the race and allowing Daquigan to come out ahead to take his first Cup win. Matsuyama and Iidaka completed the podium. As a result of the incident in the final corner, Ogiwara was given a double Long Lap Penalty in Race 2, and would later serve a third one for shortcutting at Turn 9. This caused him to lose contact with the leading group. Daquigan clinched his second Cup win, ahead of Ikegami and Matsuyama. Bunprawes and Iidaka missed out on the podium spots, while Ogiwara finished in sixth place.

The final round of the season took place at the Sepang International Circuit. Ikegami emerged ahead in Race 1, claiming his first win of the season. Starting from pole, Ogiwara finished second and secured the championship title in the process. Daquigan completed the podium. Race 2 saw rookie Teerin Fleming claim his maiden Cup win, beating Ogiwara by 0.013 seconds after pulling out of the slipstream, having exited the final corner in second place. Matsuyama completed the podium as Ikegami crashed out of the lead with five laps remaining.
