= Ryota Ogiwara =

Japanese motorcycle racer (born 2008)

Ryota Ogiwara 荻原 羚大
- Born: 7 September 2008 (age 18); Kawagoe, Saitama, Japan
- Nationality: Japanese
- Current team: Asia Talent Team
- Bike number: 97
Statistics
Moto3 World Championship
Active years	2026–
Manufacturer	KTM
Team(s)	Code Motorsports
Starts / Wins / Podiums / Poles / F. laps / Points; 2 / 0 / 0 / 0 / 0 / 0
Moto3 Junior World Championship
Active years	2026–
Manufacturer	Honda
Starts / Wins / Podiums / Poles / F. laps / Points; 12 / 0 / 0 / 0 / 2 / 92
All Japan J-GP3
Active years	2022, 2024–2025
Championships	0
Manufacturer	Honda
Starts / Wins / Podiums / Poles / F. laps / Points; 4 / 0 / 2 / 1 / 0 / 40

Ryota Ogiwara (Japanese: 荻原 羚大, Hepburn: Ogiwara Ryōta; born 7 September 2008) is a Japanese motorcycle racer who competes in the Moto3 Junior World Championship and Red Bull Rookies Cup.

In 2025, Ogiwara was crowned Asia Talent Cup champion.

== Career ==
=== Early career ===
Ogiwara was born in Kawagoe, Japan. Influenced by his father Daisuke, a motorcycle enthusiast, he began riding pocket bikes at the age of five. He progressed to mini-bikes by age ten and entered road racing at twelve. By 2021, Ogiwara had won two junior championships and competed in the final round of the Tsukuba Road Race Championship in the S80 class.

=== All Japan Road Race Championship (2022–2025) ===
Ogiwara entered the All Japan Road Race Championship for the first time in 2022, at the age of 13. Having competed in the regional Tsukuba Road Race Championship throughout 2021 and 2022, he participated in the J-GP3 race of the Tsukuba round and finished in 22nd place, as highest ranked Special Participation rider, in front of Seiryu Ikegami. In the following year, Ogiwara competed in the MFJ Cup JP250 category, where he claimed several back-to-back wins and was crowned champion of the domestic class.

In 2024, Ogiwara made a wildcard entry in the Motegi round of the J-GP3 class. During qualifying practice he set pole position and finished in third place in the Sunday race, behind Rei Wakamatsu, who took victory after a close battle to the line. He would participate in the 2025 round at Motegi again, where he finished in third place, replicating his 2024 result.

That same year, Ogiwara debuted in the ST600 class of the All Japan Road Race Championship, replacing the injured Kanta Hamada at SDG Harc Pro. He finished eighth and fourth in Races 1 and 2, respectively.

=== MotoAmerica (2022, 2025) ===
In September 2022, Ogiwara made his debut in the MotoAmerica Junior Cup, participating in the final two rounds of the season at New Jersey and Alabama. He finished his first MotoAmerica race just outside of the podium, and clinched a third place in the second race of the final round at Barber Motorsports Park.

In June 2025, Ogiwara returned to the MotoAmerica paddock, this time competing in the Supersport Championship in The Ridge Motorsports Park round, aboard a Suzuki GSX-R600—where he finished 14th and eighth in Races 1 and 2, respectively.

=== Asia Talent Cup (2023–2025) ===
In October 2022, Ogiwara was selected to compete in the 2023 Asia Talent Cup season. He secured his first Cup podium in the penultimate round at Sepang, behind Pratama and Mitani. At the final round in Qatar, he placed second in both races, missing out on victory by milliseconds. He moved up in the standings to third overall, making him the top-placed rookie. In 2024, Ogiwara remained in the Asia Talent Cup for a second year. At the Indonesian round, he claimed his first pole position in the Cup and secured his maiden victory in Race 2, after a fourth place in Race 1. He finished on the podium in both races at the Motegi round, and claimed his second Cup win at the Thai round in wet conditions. He finished the season with a second place at Sepang, ultimately losing the title to Zen Mitani.

Ogiwara returned to the Asia Talent Cup for a third season in 2025. He dominated the championship by winning eight races in a row in front of rival Seiryu Ikegami, breaking the record previously set by Taiyo Furusato of the most consecutive wins in the Cup. He was crowned champion at the final round in Sepang with one race remaining.

=== Red Bull MotoGP Rookies Cup (2026) ===
Ogiwara was promoted to the Red Bull MotoGP Rookies Cup for the 2026 season. Following a top ten finish in the opening round at Jerez, Ogiwara scored his maiden podium in the cup with a second place finish in Le Mans Race 1, and ended the weekend with a fifth place in Race 2. In the following round at Mugello, after qualifying on the front row, Ogiwara claimed his first victory in the series in Race 1 before completing a clean sweep of the weekend with another win in Race 2. He clinched his third win of the season during the fifth round at Sachsenring, and arrived to the final round at the Red Bull Ring in second place, only eight points behind championship leader Beñat Fernández. He finished Race 1 in fourth place, but fell on the first lap of Race 2 and consequently finished the season in third place overall, 16 points behind champion Fernández.

=== Moto3 Junior World Championship (2026) ===
Ogiwara was also promoted to the newly rebranded FIM Moto3 Junior World Championship in 2026 with the Asia Talent Team.

=== Moto3 World Championship (2026) ===
On 24 September 2026, Boé Motorsports announced Ogiwara would be making his World Championship debut at the Japanese Grand Prix, serving as a replacement for the injured Cormac Buchanan.

== Career statistics ==
=== Tsukuba Road Race Championship ===
==== Races by year ====
(key) (Races in bold indicate pole position; races in italics indicate fastest lap. Superscript numbers indicate overall results, including both national and international classes.)

Year	Class	Bike	1	2	3	4	Pos	Pts
2021	S80	Honda	TSU1; 13	TSU2; 9	TSU3; 4	TSU4; 4	7th	36
2022	J-GP3 (Note: National class.)	Honda	TSU1; 4^{4}	TSU2; 3^{4}	TSU3; Ret	TSU4; 6^{6}	6th	39

=== All Japan Road Race Championship ===
==== Races by year ====
(key) (Races in bold indicate pole position; races in italics indicate fastest lap. Superscript numbers indicate overall results, including both national and international classes.)

Year	Class	Bike	1	2	3	4	5	6	Pos	Pts
2022	J-GP3	Honda	MOT	SUG	TSU; 22	AUT	OKA	SUZ	NC (Note: Competed under a Special Participation license which is ineligible for points.)	-
2023	JP250	Honda	MOT; 1^{2}	SUG; 1^{1}	**TSU**; 1^{1}	AUT	**OKA**; 1^{1}	SUZ	1st	100
2024	J-GP3	FTR Honda	**MOT**; 3	SUG	TSU; 8	AUT	OKA	SUZ	12th	24
2025	ST600	Honda	SUG1; 8	SUG2; 4					14th	16.7
2025	J-GP3	Honda			MOT; 3	AUT	OKA	SUZ	13th	16

=== MotoAmerica ===
==== Races by year ====
(key) (Races in bold indicate pole position, races in italics indicate fastest lap)

Year	Class	Bike	1		2		3		4		5		6		7		8		9		Pos	Pts
Year	Class	Bike	R1	R2	R1	R2	R1	R2	R1	R2	R1	R2	R1	R2	R1	R2	R1	R2	R1	R2	Pos	Pts
2022	Junior Cup	Kawasaki	ATL	ATL	VIR	VIR	RAM	RAM	TRD	TRD	LGS	LGS	BRA	BRA	PIT	PIT	NJR; 4	NJR; Ret	ALA; 6	ALA; 3	16th	39
2025	Supersport	Suzuki	ALA	ALA	ATL	ATL	RAM	RAM	RID; 14	RID; 8	MON	MON	VIR	VIR	MID	MID	TEX	TEX	NJR	NJR	24th	10

=== Asia Talent Cup ===
==== Races by year ====
(key) (Races in bold indicate pole position, races in italics indicate fastest lap)

Year	Bike	1		2		3		4		5		6		Pos	Pts
Year	Bike	R1	R2	R1	R2	R1	R2	R1	R2	R1	R2	R1	R2	Pos	Pts
2023	Honda	MAL; 6	MAL; 4	JPN; 4	JPN; 6	INA; Ret	INA; 4	THA; 7	THA; 4	SEP; 4	SEP; 3	QAT; 2	QAT; 2	3rd	150
2024	Honda	QAT; Ret	QAT; 16	MAL; 2	MAL; 5	**INA**; 4	**INA**; 1	JPN; 2	JPN; 3	**THA**; 3	**THA**; 1	SEP; 4	SEP; 2	2nd	179
2025	Honda	THA; 1	THA; 1	**QAT**; 1	**QAT**; 1	**MAL**; 1	**MAL**; 1	JPN; 1	JPN; 1	INA; Ret	INA; 6	**SEP**; 2	**SEP**; 2	1st	250

=== Asia Road Racing Championship ===
==== Races by year ====
(key) (Races in bold indicate pole position; races in italics indicate fastest lap)

Year	Class	Bike	1		2		3		4		5		6		Pos	Pts
Year	Class	Bike	R1	R2	R1	R2	R1	R2	R1	R2	R1	R2	R1	R2	Pos	Pts
2024	AP250	Honda	BUR	BUR	ZHU	ZHU	MOT; 6	MOT; 2	MAN	MAN	SEP	SEP	BUR	BUR	16th	30
2025	AP250	Honda	BUR	BUR	SEP	SEP	MOT; 2	MOT; 4	MAN	MAN	SEP	SEP	BUR	BUR	16th	33

=== Red Bull MotoGP Rookies Cup ===
==== Races by year ====
(key) (Races in bold indicate pole position; races in italics indicate fastest lap)

Year	Bike	1		2		3		4		5		6		7		Pos	Pts
Year	Bike	R1	R2	R1	R2	R1	R2	R1	R2	R1	R2	R1	R2	R1	R2	Pos	Pts
2026	KTM	JER; 11	JER; 9	LMS; 2	LMS; 5	MUG; 1	MUG; 1	ASS; 4	ASS; 18	SAC; 1	SAC; Ret	MIS; 10	MIS; 7	RBR; 4	RBR; 19	3rd	159

=== FIM Moto3 Junior World Championship ===
==== Races by year ====
(key) (Races in bold indicate pole position; races in italics indicate fastest lap)

Year	Bike	1	2	3	4	5	6	7	8	9	10	11	12	Pos	Pts
2026	Honda	CAT1; 4	CAT2; 7	EST; 10	JER1; 9	JER2; 7	MAG; 6	VAL1; 6	VAL2; 7	ARA1; 6	ARA2; 7	MIS1; Ret	MIS2; Ret	8th	92

=== Grand Prix motorcycle racing ===
==== By season ====
Season	Class	Motorcycle	Team	Race	Win	Podium	Pole	FLap	Pts	Plcd
2026	Moto3	KTM	Code Motorsports	2	0	0	0	0	0*	29th*
Total				**2**	**0**	**0**	**0**	**0**	**0**	

==== By class ====
Class	Seasons	1st GP	1st pod	1st win	Race	Win	Podiums	Pole	FLap	Pts	WChmp
Moto3	2026	2026 Japan			2	0	0	0	0	0	0
Total	2026				**2**	**0**	**0**	**0**	**0**	**0**	**0**

==== Races by year ====
(key) (Races in bold indicate pole position; races in italics indicate fastest lap)

Year	Class	Bike	1	2	3	4	5	6	7	8	9	10	11	12	13	14	15	16	17	18	19	20	21	22	Pos	Pts
2026	Moto3	KTM	THA	BRA	USA	SPA	FRA	CAT	ITA	HUN	CZE	NED	GER	GBR	ARA	RSM	AUT	JPN; 16	INA; Ret	AUS	MAL	QAT	POR	VAL	29th*	0*

* Season still in progress.
