= Yamaha T-150 =

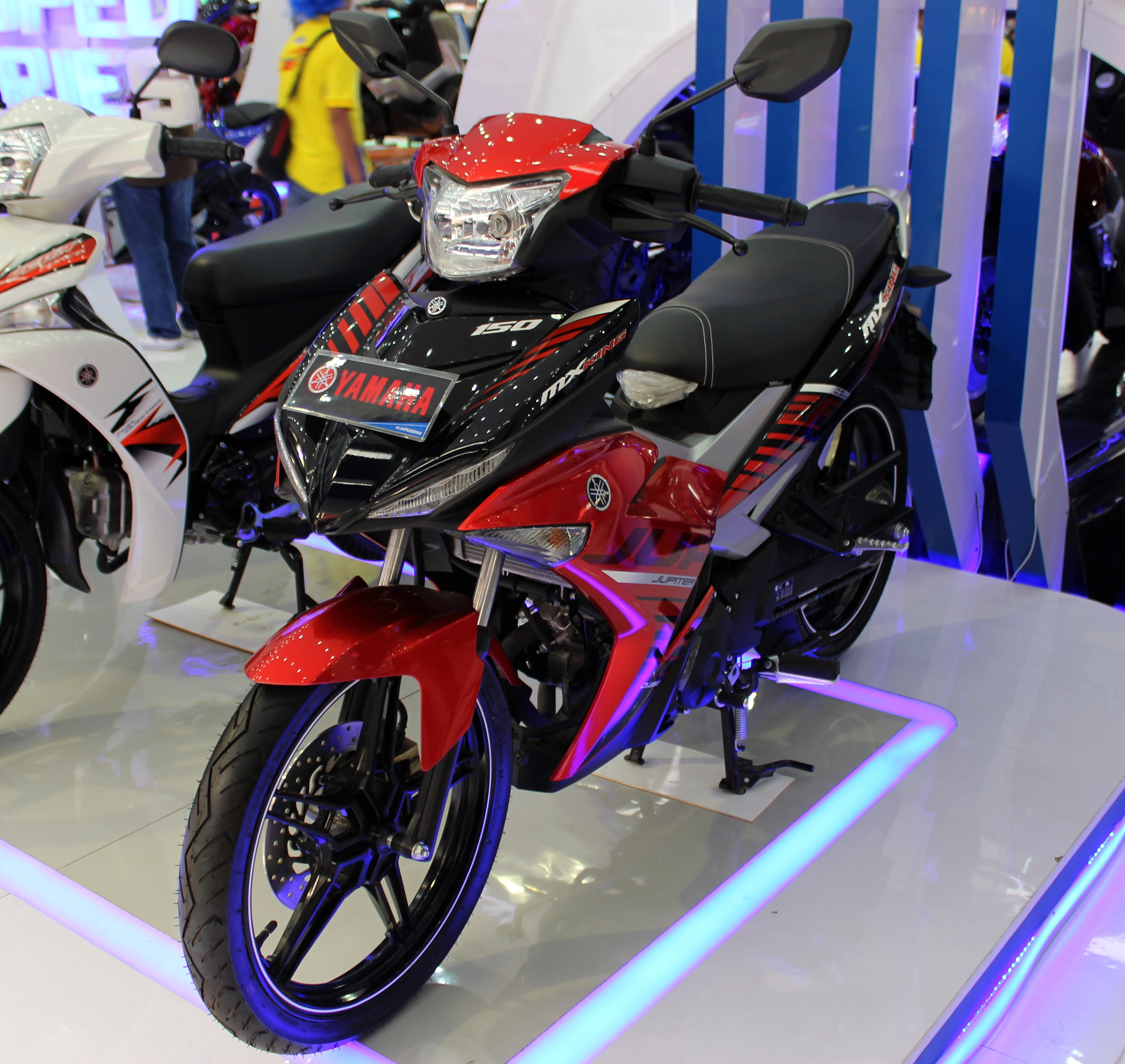
- Yamaha Jupiter MX King 150 (Indonesia)
- Manufacturer: Yamaha Motor Company
- Also called: Yamaha Exciter 150/155 (Thailand and Vietnam); Yamaha Sniper 150 MXi (Philippines and Singapore); Yamaha Jupiter MX/MX King 150 (Indonesia and Iran); Yamaha Y15ZR/Y16ZR (Malaysia)
- Parent company: Yamaha Corporation
- Production: 2015–present
- Predecessor: Yamaha T135
- Class: Underbone
- Engine: 149.7 cc (9.1 cu in) liquid-cooled 4-stroke 4-valve SOHC single-cylinder (2015–present); 155.1 cc (9.5 cu in) liquid-cooled 4-stroke 4-valve SOHC single-cylinder with "Variable Valve Actuation" system (2021–present)
- Bore / stroke: 57.0 mm × 58.7 mm (2.24 in × 2.31 in) (150 cc model); 58.0 mm × 58.7 mm (2.28 in × 2.31 in) (155 cc model)
- Compression ratio: 10.4:1 (150 cc model); 10.5:1 (155 cc model)
- Ignition type: TCI
- Transmission: 5-speed constant mesh (150 cc model); 6-speed constant mesh (155 cc model)
- Frame type: Tubular steel diamond (backbone)
- Suspension: Front: Telescopic fork; Rear: Swingarm with monoshock
- Brakes: Front: Single/dual-piston caliper with single disc; Rear: Single-piston caliper with single disc
- Tires: Front: 70/90-17 (2015–2018), 90/80-17 (2018–present) (tubeless); Rear: 120/70-17 (tubeless)
- Wheelbase: 1,240 mm (49 in) (150 cc model); 1,290 mm (51 in) (155 cc model)
- Dimensions: L: 1,970 mm (78 in) (150 cc model, 2015–2018); 1,985 mm (78.1 in) (150 cc model, 2018–present); 1,975 mm (77.8 in) (155 cc model); W: 670 mm (26 in) (150 cc model, 2015–2018); 690 mm (27 in) (150 cc model, 2018–present); 665 mm (26.2 in) (155 cc model); H: 1,080 mm (43 in) (150 cc model); 1,085 mm (42.7 in) (155 cc model)
- Seat height: 780 mm (31 in) (150 cc model); 795 mm (31.3 in) (155 cc model)
- Weight: 115 kg (253.5 lb) (2015–2018); 117 kg (257.9 lb) (2018–present); (wet)
- Fuel capacity: 4.2 L (0.92 imp gal; 1.1 US gal) (150 cc model); 5.4 L (1.2 imp gal; 1.4 US gal) (155 cc model)

The Yamaha T-150 is an underbone model manufactured by Yamaha Motor Company since 2015. It is marketed under the names Exciter 150/155 in Thailand and Vietnam, Sniper 150 MXi in the Philippines and Singapore, Jupiter MX/MX King 150 in Indonesia and Iran, and Y15ZR/Y16ZR in Malaysia. It is powered by a 149.7 cc (9.14 cu in) or a 155.1 cc (9.5 cu in) single-cylinder engine.

== Model updates ==
=== 2018 ===
In August 2018, the T-150 received some updates. The bike received a LED headlamp, wider front tire and different handlebar cowl that also houses a LCD instrument panel, from the previous version combination analogue/digital gauge, which is complemented by a passing light switch, engine kill switch and alarm fob. The bike is also claimed to be 2 kg (4.4 lb) heavier than the previous version. The engine specifications remained the same.

=== 2021 ===
On 29 December 2020, the T-150 received a major upgrade. The engine displacement has increased to 155 cc, complemented with "Variable Valve Actuation" system & 6-speed manual transmission.

=== 2023 ===
In September 2023, the 155 cc model of the T-150 received a minor redesign.

== Vietnam ==
Yamaha Exciter 150 (called in Vietnam) was first launched in 2014, replacing the 135 model. It had a brand new 150cc liquid-cooled engine (the previous had a 135cc liquid-cooled engine), combined with a 5-speed constant mesh manual transmission. In 2018, this bike received an update, with some design changes and new technologies (LED headlights, LCD instrument panel, passing button, on/off engine switch and Answer back key). In 2020, a brand new version was released in Vietnam, called the 155 VVA. It had a new 155cc engine with VVA "Variable Valve Actuation" technology developed from the R15 that according to Yamaha Vietnam was 17% more powerful than the 150cc engine version, a new 6-speed constant mesh manual transmission and an A&S "Assist & Slipper" Clutch that allowed for 20% lighter clutch work and reducing back-end torque when downshifting aggressively. In September 2023, the 155 VVA version received a minor update, including the engine now producing 17.9HP (0.2HP more than the pre-facelift version) and slightly better economy (1,91L/100km for Standard trim, 1,99L/100km for Premium, Limited GP trim compared to 2,09L/100km for the pre-facelift version on all models). The bike is also available with ABS "Anti-lock Brake System" on the Premium and Limited GP trim (there are 2 models on the Premium trim: with or without ABS). Yamaha Vietnam is selling both the 150 and 155 VVA as for now.
