= Nissin Kogyo =

Japanese automotive parts brand

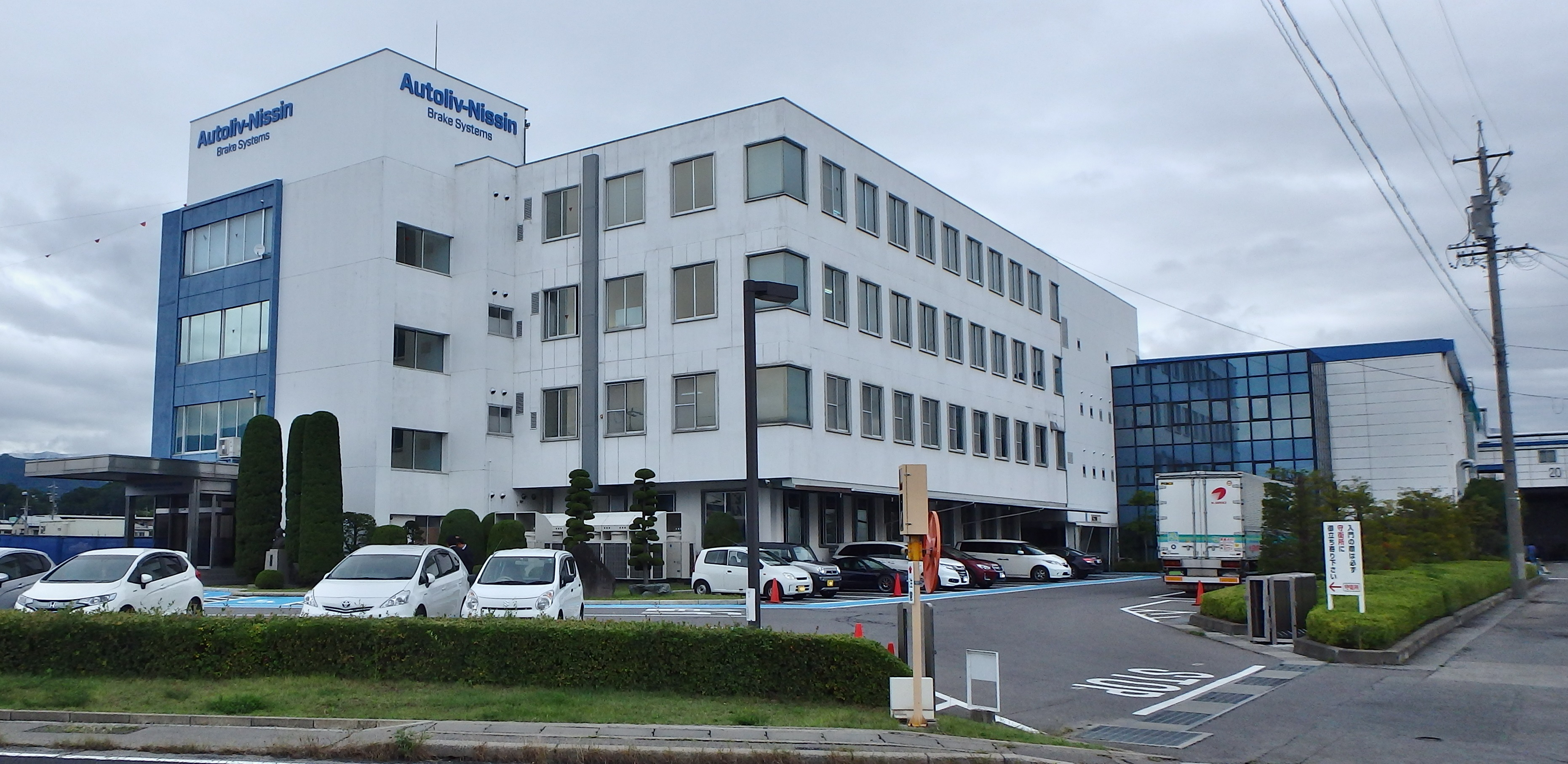
- Nissin Kogyo headquarters
- Native name: 日信工業株式会社
- Company type: Brand
- Industry: Automotive
- Founded: October 1953; 72 years ago
- Headquarters: Tomi City, Nagano, 389-0514, Japan
- Area served: Worldwide
- Key people: Yasushi Kawaguchi (President and CEO)
- Products: Brake systems for 2- and 4-wheeled vehicles; Aluminum products
- Revenue: JPY 166.8 billion (FY 2016) (US$ 1.54 billion) (FY 2016)
- Net income: JPY 5.3 billion (FY 2016) (US$ 49 million) (FY 2016)
- Number of employees: 9,557 (consolidated, as of March 31, 2016)
- Parent: Astemo

Nissin Kogyo (日信工業株式会社, Nisshin Kōgyō Kabushiki-gaisha) is a Japanese automotive parts brand of vehicle braking systems and aluminium products owned by Astemo. The company was founded in 1953 and was listed on the first section of the Tokyo Stock Exchange until January 2021. As of March 2017, the company had 1.54 billion dollars in revenue and 9,557 employees. Honda Motor Company was the largest shareholder, owning 34.6 percent of total shares.

Nissin Kogyo is headquartered in Nagano, Japan with subsidiary manufacturing plants in Ohio, Georgia, USA, Mexico, Brazil, India, Indonesia, Thailand, Vietnam and China.

In 2016, Nissin Kogyo created Veoneer-Nissin Brake Systems (VNBS), a joint subsidiary with Swedish automotive safety manufacturer Veoneer.

On 30 October 2019, Nissin Kogyo, Keihin Corporation, and Showa Corporation announced that they would merge with Hitachi Automotive Systems to become Astemo.
