= 2025 All Japan Road Race Championship =

Motorcycle road racing season

2025 All Japan Road Race champions

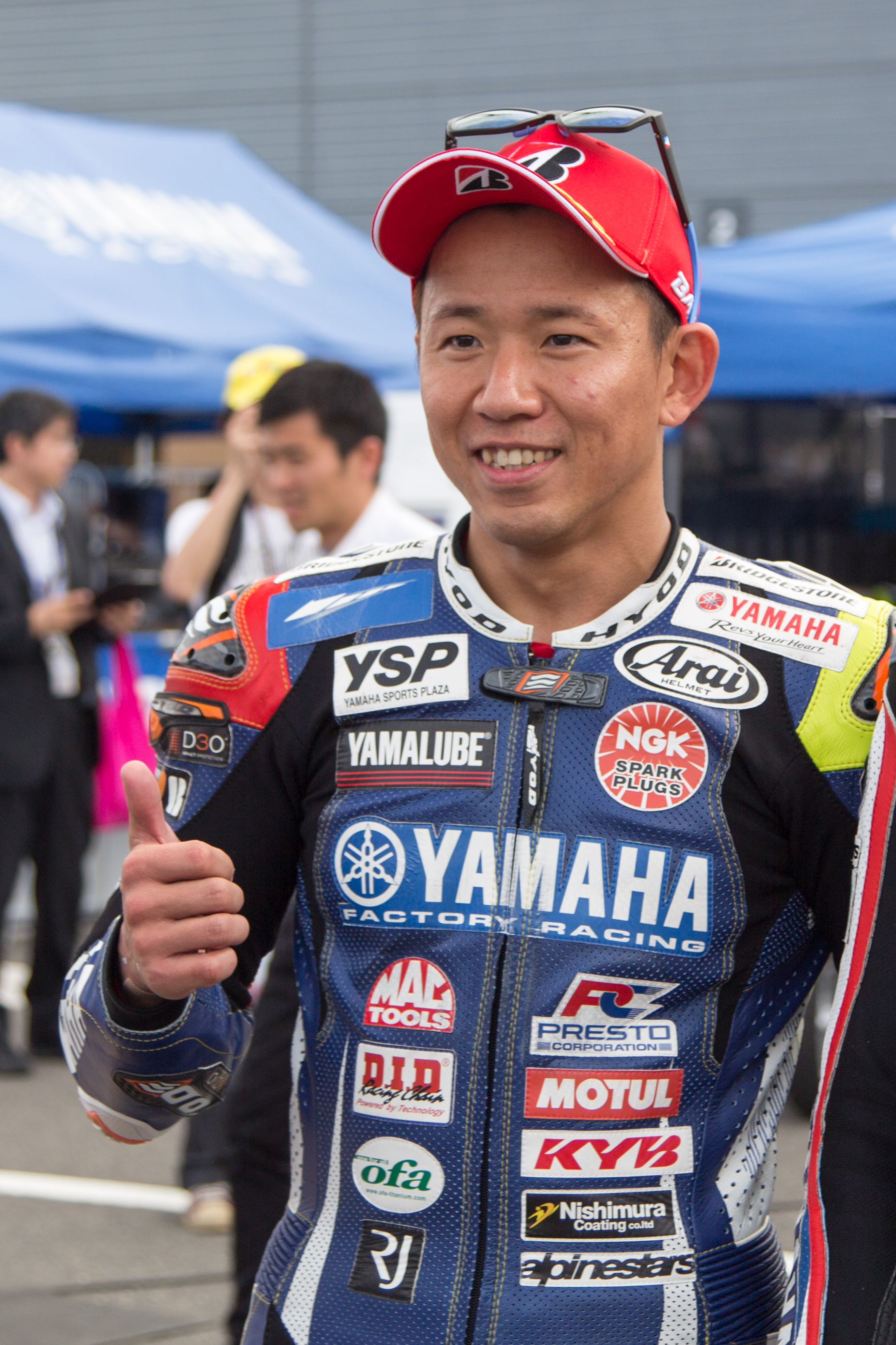
Katsuyuki Nakasuga won the JSB1000 class

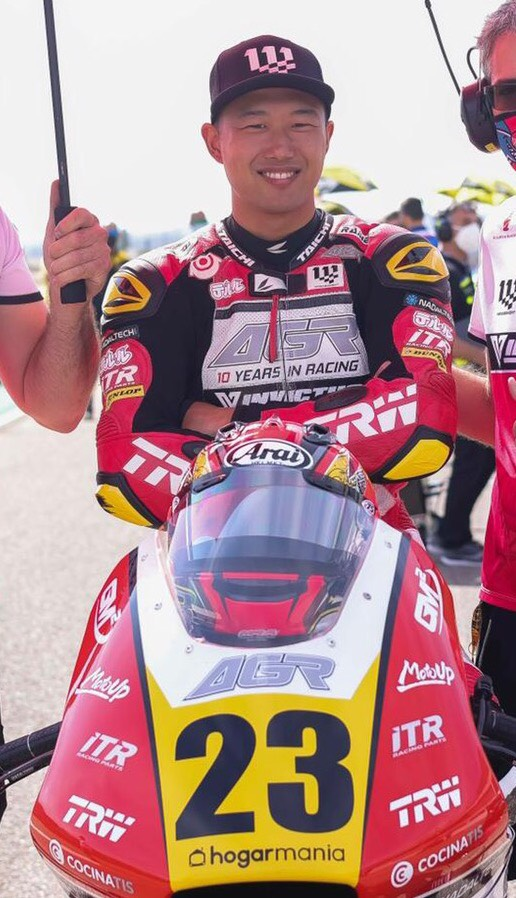
Taiga Hada won the ST1000 class

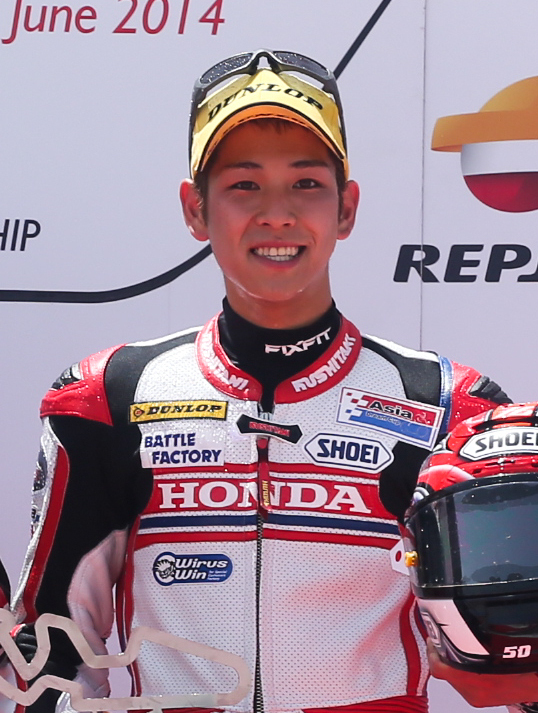
Hiroki Ono won the J-GP3 class

The 2025 MFJ All Japan Road Race Championship (Japanese: 2025 MFJ全日本ロードレース選手権シリーズ, Hepburn: 2025 MFJ Zen Nihon Rōdo Rēsu Senshuken Shirīzu) was the 59th MFJ Road Race season of the All Japan Road Race Championship since the series-format started, and the 64th consecutive year since the first All Japan race was held after the MFJ was established. The season commenced at Motegi on 19 April, and concluded on 26 October at the 57th MFJ Grand Prix at Suzuka Circuit.

Katsuyuki Nakasuga, Taiga Hada, Yuta Date and Hiroki Ono were the JSB1000, ST1000, ST600 and J-GP3 champions, respectively.

== Calendar ==
The official calendar was released on 29 October 2024. The JSB1000 class event scheduled for 8–9 March at Suzuka Circuit was cancelled.

| Round | Circuit | Location | Date | Class | Map of circuit locations |
|---|---|---|---|---|---|
| 1 | Mobility Resort Motegi | (Tochigi Prefecture) Motegi, Tochigi | 19–20 April | JSB1000 (Note: The race served as a support race to the 2025 Super Formula Championship round.) | 2025 All Japan Road Race Championship is located in Japan |
| 2 | Sportsland SUGO | (Miyagi Prefecture) Murata, Miyagi | 24–25 May | JSB1000†, ST1000, ST600†, J-GP3 | 2025 All Japan Road Race Championship is located in Japan |
| 3 | Tsukuba Circuit | (Ibaraki Prefecture) Shimotsuma, Ibaraki | 21–22 June | J-GP3† | 2025 All Japan Road Race Championship is located in Japan |
| 4 | Mobility Resort Motegi | (Tochigi Prefecture) Motegi, Tochigi | 23–24 August | JSB1000†, ST1000†, ST600, J-GP3 | 2025 All Japan Road Race Championship is located in Japan |
| 5 | Autopolis | (Ōita Prefecture) Hita, Ōita | 13–14 September | JSB1000†, ST1000, ST600, J-GP3 | 2025 All Japan Road Race Championship is located in Japan |
| 6 | Okayama International Circuit | (Okayama Prefecture) Mimasaka, Okayama | 4–5 October | JSB1000, ST1000, ST600, J-GP3 | 2025 All Japan Road Race Championship is located in Japan |
| 7 | Suzuka Circuit | (Mie Prefecture) Suzuka, Mie | 25–26 October | JSB1000†, ST1000, ST600, J-GP3 | 2025 All Japan Road Race Championship is located in Japan |

- † – Double-header

== Teams and riders ==
=== JSB1000 participants ===
| Team | Constructor | Motorcycle | Tyre | No. | Rider | Rounds |
|---|---|---|---|---|---|---|
| (Japan) HiCity Racing Aprilia | Aprilia | RSV4 1100 Factory | B | 34 | (Japan) Yuta Okaya | 1–2, 7 |
| (Japan) Sanmei Team Taro Plusone | BMW | M1000RR | B | 11 | (Japan) Taro Sekiguchi | 1–2, 4–7 |
| (Japan) AutoRace Ube Racing Team | BMW | M1000RR | B | 31 | (Japan) Naomichi Uramoto | 1–2, 4, 7 |
| (Japan) Shinsyuren with Totec | BMW | M1000RR | B | 39 | (Japan) Hinata Nakajima | 1, 6–7 |
| (Japan) Tone RT Syncedge4413 BMW | BMW | M1000RR | D | 24 | (Japan) Tomoya Hoshino | 1–2, 4–7 |
| (Japan) Tone RT Syncedge4413 BMW | BMW | M1000RR | D | 28 | (Japan) Ainosuke Yoshida | 1–2, 4–7 |
| (Japan) Ducati Team Kagayama | Ducati | Panigale V4 R | B | 3 | (Japan) Ryo Mizuno | 1, 4–7 |
| (Japan) Astemo Pro Honda SI Racing | Honda | CBR1000RR-R | B | 4 | (Japan) Kohta Nozane | 1–2, 4–7 |
| (Japan) Astemo Pro Honda SI Racing | Honda | CBR1000RR-R | D | 36 | (Japan) Kohta Arakawa | 1 |
| (Japan) SDG Team HARC-PRO Honda | Honda | CBR1000RR-R | B | 6 | (Japan) Teppei Nagoe | 1–2, 4–5 |
| (Japan) SDG Team HARC-PRO Honda | Honda | CBR1000RR-R | B | 46 | (Japan) Keito Abe | 6–7 |
| (Japan) Team ATJ | Honda | CBR1000RR-R | B | 8 | (Japan) Satoru Iwata | 1–2, 4–7 |
| (Japan) Team ATJ | Honda | CBR1000RR-R | B | 30 | (Japan) Kohki Suzuki | 1–2, 4–7 |
| (Japan) Honda Dream RT Sakurai | Honda | CBR1000RR-R | B | 9 | (Japan) Kazuki Ito | 1–2, 4–7 |
| (Japan) Honda Dream RT Sakurai | Honda | CBR1000RR-R | B | 14 | (Japan) Daijiro Hiura | 2, 7 |
| (Japan) Honda Suzuka Racing Team | Honda | CBR1000RR-R | B | 17 | (Japan) Yuki Sugiyama | 1–2, 4–7 |
| Team Sugai Racing Japan | Honda | CBR1000RR-R | B | 33 | (Japan) Yoshiyuki Sugai | 1–2, 4, 7 |
| (Japan) Dunlop Racing Team with Yahagi | Honda | CBR1000RR-R | D | 10 | (Japan) Tetsuta Nagashima | 1–2, 4–7 |
| (Japan) Honda HRC Test Team | Honda | CBR1000RR-R | B | 5 | (Japan) Takumi Takahashi | 1 |
| (Japan) Toho Racing | Honda | CBR1000RR-R | D | 37 | (Japan) Takuma Kunimine | 1 |
| (Japan) Toho Racing | Honda | CBR1000RR-R | D | 38 | (Japan) Kousuke Sakumoto | 1 |
| (Japan) Honda Tochigi Racing | Honda | CBR1000RR-R | D | 43 | (Japan) Takafumi Kato | 1 |
| (Japan) KRP Sanyoukougyo RS-Itoh | Kawasaki | ZX-10R | B | 25 | (Japan) Masahiro Shinjo | 1–2, 4–7 |
| (Japan) KRP Sanyoukougyo RS-Itoh | Kawasaki | ZX-10R | B | 32 | (Japan) Tatsuya Nakamura | 1–2, 4–7 |
| (Japan) KRP Sanyoukougyo RS-Itoh | Kawasaki | ZX-10R | D | 15 | (Japan) Yuto Sano | 1 |
| (Japan) Team Suzuki CN Challenge | Suzuki | GSX-R1000R | B | 7 | (Japan) Takuya Tsuda | 1–2, 4–7 |
| (Japan) Factory Hiro HLO Racing | Suzuki | GSX-R1000R | B | 44 | (Japan) Kota Higuchi | 5, 7 |
| (Japan) Yoshimura SERT Motul | Suzuki | GSX-R1000R | B | 16 | (Japan) Cocoro Atsumi | 6–7 |
| (Japan) S-Pulse Dream Racing | Suzuki | GSX-R1000R | B | 45 | (Japan) Hideyuki Ogata | 6–7 |
| (Japan) Yamaha Factory Racing Team | Yamaha | YZF-R1 | B | 2 | (Japan) Katsuyuki Nakasuga | 1–2, 4–7 |
| (Japan) Team Kodama | Yamaha | YZF-R1 | B | 13 | (Japan) Yuta Kodama | 1–2, 4–7 |
| (Japan) Team BabyFace | Yamaha | YZF-R1 | B | 20 | (Japan) Kazuma Tsuda | 1–2, 4–7 |
| (Japan) Kawaken GBS Racing MRB | Yamaha | YZF-R1 | B | 35 | (Japan) Riku Sugawara | 1 |
| (Japan) RSN | Yamaha | YZF-R1 | D | 23 | (Japan) Shinichi Nakatomi | 1–2, 4–7 |
| (Japan) Dog Fight Racing JDS | Yamaha | YZF-R1 | D | 41 | (Japan) Rei Toshima | 1 |

Key
Regular rider
Replacement rider
Wildcard rider

=== ST1000 participants ===
| Team | Constructor | Motorcycle | Tyre | No. | Rider | Rounds |
|---|---|---|---|---|---|---|
| (Japan) Team Tatara Aprilia | Aprilia | RSV4 1100 Factory | D | 10 | (Japan) Ruka Wada | 2, 4–7 |
| (Japan) Team Tatara Aprilia | Aprilia | RSV4 1100 Factory | D | 32 | (Japan) Akito Haga | 2, 4–7 |
| (Japan) Sanmei Team Taro Plusone | BMW | M1000RR | D | 29 | (United States) Zechariah Dzegede | 2, 4–7 |
| (Japan) Racing Team Seki | BMW | M1000RR | D | 25 | (Japan) Kazumasa Seki | 6 |
| (Japan) Shinsyuren With Totec | BMW | M1000RR | D | 41 | (Japan) Isami Higashimura | 6–7 |
| (Japan) Astemo Pro Honda SI Racing (Japan) Astemo SI Racing with Thai Honda | Honda | CBR1000RR-R | D | 3 | (Japan) Taiga Hada | 2, 4–7 |
| (Japan) Astemo Pro Honda SI Racing (Japan) Astemo SI Racing with Thai Honda | Honda | CBR1000RR-R | D | 5 | (Japan) Kohta Arakawa | 2, 4–7 |
| (Japan) Astemo Pro Honda SI Racing (Japan) Astemo SI Racing with Thai Honda | Honda | CBR1000RR-R | D | 34 | (Thailand) Nakarin Atiratphuvapat | 2, 5–7 |
| (Japan) Toho Racing | Honda | CBR1000RR-R | D | 4 | (Japan) Takuma Kunimine | 2, 4–7 |
| (Japan) Toho Racing | Honda | CBR1000RR-R | D | 8 | (Japan) Kosuke Sakumoto | 2, 4–7 |
| (Japan) Moto Bum Honda | Honda | CBR1000RR-R | D | 9 | (Japan) Motoharu Ito | 2, 4–5, 7 |
| (Japan) Moto Bum Honda | Honda | CBR1000RR-R | D | 15 | (Japan) Yasuhiro Matsukawa | 2, 4–7 |
| Japan Post Honda Racing-TP | Honda | CBR1000RR-R | D | 23 | (Japan) Sho Nishimura | 2, 4–7 |
| RT Japan M Auto | Honda | CBR1000RR-R | D | 33 | (Japan) Yudai Kamei | 2, 4–7 |
| RT Japan M Auto | Honda | CBR1000RR-R | D | 39 | (Japan) Tsukasa Murata | 5–6 |
| (Japan) Clubnext & Honda Dream Takasaki | Honda | CBR1000RR-R | D | 22 | (Japan) Hikaru Yoshihiro | 4, 7 |
| (Japan) Honda Ryokuyokai Kumamoto Racing | Honda | CBR1000RR-R | D | 18 | (Japan) Mitsuhiro Yoshida | 5 |
| (Japan) Team Izumi | Honda | CBR1000RR-R | D | 28 | (Japan) Takashi Arase | 5 |
| (Japan) Honda Blue Helmets MSC Kumamoto | Honda | CBR1000RR-R | D | 38 | (Japan) Hiromasa Okada | 5 |
| (Japan) Moto Win Racing | Honda | CBR1000RR-R | D | 45 | (Japan) Yutaka Murase | 6 |
| (Japan) Team Bizenseiki | Honda | CBR1000RR-R | D | 16 | (Japan) Masaki Yamanaka | 7 |
| (Japan) Kawasaki Plaza Racing Team | Kawasaki | ZX-10R | D | 2 | (Japan) Ryosuke Iwato | 2, 4–7 |
| (Japan) Kawasaki Plaza Racing Team | Kawasaki | ZX-10R | D | 17 | (Japan) Gun Mie | 2, 4–7 |
| (Japan) KRP Sanyoukougyo RS-Itoh | Kawasaki | ZX-10R | D | 31 | (Japan) Yuto Sano | 2, 4–7 |
| (Japan) Team Titan-TKR Suzuki | Suzuki | GSX-R1000R | D | 12 | (Japan) Takeru Murase | 2, 4–7 |
| (Japan) Akeno Speed | Yamaha | YZF-R1 | D | 6 | (Japan) Shota Ite | 2, 4–7 |
| (Japan) Akeno Speed | Yamaha | YZF-R1 | D | 37 | (Australia) Jonathan Nahlous | 4 |
| (Japan) Dog Fight Racing JDS | Yamaha | YZF-R1 | D | 7 | (Japan) Rei Toshima | 2, 4–7 |
| (Japan) Kure Bay Side & Pro-Tec | Yamaha | YZF-R1 | D | 26 | (Japan) Naoyuki Sato | 2, 4–7 |
| (Japan) Hisa31 with R-in Spirits | Yamaha | YZF-R1 | D | 30 | (Japan) Hisami Arai | 2, 4–7 |
| (Japan) 539ENAC Racing | Yamaha | YZF-R1 | D | 24 | (Japan) Masaaki Takada | 2 |
| (Japan) Yokoyama Byouinn RSN | Yamaha | YZF-R1 | D | 35 | (Japan) Sota Furuyama | 2, 6–7 |
| (Japan) HC Riders with Takasaki Law Office | Yamaha | YZF-R1 | D | 36 | (Japan) Michiyasu Matsumura | 4 |
| (Japan) Speedtec KBS with J-Trip | Yamaha | YZF-R1 | D | 40 | (Japan) Taichi Honda | 6–7 |
| (Japan) Nichirin Racing | Yamaha | YZF-R1 | D | 44 | (Japan) Masaki Adachi | 6 |
| (Japan) Team Technica | Yamaha | YZF-R1 | D | 46 | (Japan) Yoshiyuki Hayashi | 6–7 |
| (Japan) West6 with T-Moto | Yamaha | YZF-R1 | D | 47 | (Japan) Nobutaka Tanimoto | 6 |

Key
Regular rider
Replacement rider
Wildcard rider

All teams use series-specified Dunlop tyres.

=== ST600 participants ===
| Team | Constructor | Motorcycle | Tyre | No. | Rider | Rounds |
|---|---|---|---|---|---|---|
| (Japan) TN45 Racing Team | Honda | CBR600RR | B | 5 | (Japan) Tetsuya Fujita | 2, 4–7 |
| (Japan) Moto Bum Honda | Honda | CBR600RR | B | 9 | (Japan) Kai Aota | 2, 4–7 |
| (Japan) Moto Bum Honda | Honda | CBR600RR | B | 31 | (Japan) Sho Tokuda | 2, 4–7 |
| (Japan) Moto Bum Honda | Honda | CBR600RR | B | 36 | (Japan) Rui Kusu | 2, 4–7 |
| (Japan) Moto Bum Honda | Honda | CBR600RR | B | 49 | (Japan) Kouga Matsumoto | 4, 6–7 |
| Japan Post Honda Racing TP; Japan Post docomo business TP | Honda | CBR600RR | B | 11 | (Japan) Tomoyoshi Koyama | 2, 4–7 |
| Japan Post Honda Racing TP; Japan Post docomo business TP | Honda | CBR600RR | B | 17 | (Japan) Syuu Yamato | 2, 4–6 |
| (Japan) Astemo Pro Honda SI Racing | Honda | CBR600RR | B | 12 | (Japan) Takuto Suzuki | 2, 6–7 |
| (Japan) SE Competition | Honda | CBR600RR | B | 13 | (Japan) Toshiki Senda | 2, 4–7 |
| (Japan) SDG Team HARC-PRO | Honda | CBR600RR | B | 21 | (Japan) Kanta Hamada | 4–7 |
| (Japan) SDG Team HARC-PRO | Honda | CBR600RR | B | 48 | (Japan) Ryota Ogiwara | 2 |
| (Japan) SDG Team HARC-PRO | Honda | CBR600RR | B | 33 | (Japan) Amon Odaki | 2, 4–7 |
| (Japan) Honda Suzuka Racing Team | Honda | CBR600RR | B | 32 | (Japan) Genki Nakajima | 2, 4–7 |
| (Japan) Battle Factory | Honda | CBR600RR | B | 37 | (Japan) Shun Miyazaki | 2, 4–6 |
| (Japan) Honda Dream Adachi Elf Racing | Honda | CBR600RR | B | 43 | (Japan) Shuichiro Nakamura | 2, 4 |
| (Japan) RSG-Racing | Honda | CBR600RR | B | 52 | (Japan) Fumito Iwanami | 5 |
| RT Japan M Auto and RSC | Honda | CBR600RR | B | 53 | (Japan) Yushin Sakamoto | 5 |
| (Japan) Toho Racing | Honda | CBR600RR | B | 22 | (Japan) Anjyu Kasai | 6–7 |
| (Japan) Moto Win Racing | Honda | CBR600RR | B | 56 | (Japan) Keisuke Tsukahara | 6 |
| (Japan) Team Sum Techno | Honda | CBR600RR | B | 20 | (Japan) Takanori Kawamoto | 7 |
| (Japan) Sketchbook Racing | Kawasaki | ZX-6R | B | 54 | (Japan) Seigo Nakashima | 6 |
| (Japan) Teamkenken YTch | Yamaha | YZF-R6 | B | 2 | (Japan) Kengo Nagao | 2, 4–7 |
| (Japan) Akeno Speed | Yamaha | YZF-R6 | B | 3 | (Japan) Yuta Date | 2, 4–7 |
| (Japan) Akeno Speed | Yamaha | YZF-R6 | B | 19 | (Japan) Sota Horii | 2, 4 |
| (Japan) Akeno Speed | Yamaha | YZF-R6 | B | 34 | (Japan) Aoi Uezu | 2, 4–7 |
| (Japan) Akeno Speed | Yamaha | YZF-R6 | B | 44 | (Japan) Soichiro Minamimoto | 2, 4–7 |
| (Japan) Ito Racing Borg Custom | Yamaha | YZF-R6 | B | 6 | (Japan) Rei Matsuoka | 2, 4–7 |
| (Japan) Ito Racing Borg Custom | Yamaha | YZF-R6 | B | 41 | (Japan) Shoma Yamane | 2, 4, 6–7 |
| (Japan) GarageL8 Racing Team | Yamaha | YZF-R6 | B | 7 | (Japan) Riku Sugawara | 2, 4, 6–7 |
| (Japan) Nitro Ryota Racing | Yamaha | YZF-R6 | B | 14 | (Japan) Ren Okabe | 2, 4–7 |
| (Japan) Nitro Ryota Racing | Yamaha | YZF-R6 | B | 16 | (Japan) Keisuke Tanaka | 2, 4–7 |
| (Japan) Nitro Ryota Racing | Yamaha | YZF-R6 | B | 30 | (Japan) Shota Yokoyama | 2 |
| (Japan) Racing Team Seki | Yamaha | YZF-R6 | B | 24 | (Japan) Shinya Mikami | 2, 4 |
| (Japan) Racing Team Seki | Yamaha | YZF-R6 | B | 40 | (Japan) Yuta Tarusawa | 2, 4–6 |
| (Japan) Kawaken GBS Racing | Yamaha | YZF-R6 | B | 38 | (Japan) Takumi Takahashi | 2, 4–7 |
| (Japan) Taira Promote Racing | Yamaha | YZF-R6 | B | 39 | (Japan) Yosuke Hosaka | 2, 4 |
| (Japan) Taira Promote Racing | Yamaha | YZF-R6 | B | 58 | (Japan) Shogo Kawasaki | 7 |
| (Japan) RT Morino Kumasan & Garage L8 | Yamaha | YZF-R6 | B | 46 | (Japan) Tatsuya Watabe | 2 |
| (Japan) Fireworks & Hokenshokun in Riders Party | Yamaha | YZF-R6 | B | 47 | (Japan) Toshiro Miyawaki | 2 |
| (Japan) Team Kou with Flash | Yamaha | YZF-R6 | B | 50 | (Japan) Kou Yamamoto | 4 |
| (Japan) Team Tec2 & 24Service & YSS | Yamaha | YZF-R6 | B | 51 | (Japan) Yoshihiro Toyohara | 5–6 |
| (Japan) Team t2y-CRS | Yamaha | YZF-R6 | B | 18 | (Japan) Tatsuya Yamaguchi | 6 |
| (Japan) Toy Boy & Flex & MMRT | Yamaha | YZF-R6 | B | 55 | (Japan) Masaki Fukushima | 6 |

Key
Regular rider
Replacement rider
Wildcard rider

All teams use series-specified Bridgestone tyres.

=== J-GP3 participants ===
| Team | Constructor | Motorcycle | Tyre | No. | Rider | Rounds |
|---|---|---|---|---|---|---|
| Japan Post docomo business TP; Japan Post Honda Racing TP | Honda | NSF250R | B | 2 | (Japan) Rei Wakamatsu | 2–5, 7 |
| Japan Post docomo business TP; Japan Post Honda Racing TP | Honda | NSF250R | B | 4 | (Japan) Shizuka Okazaki | 2–7 |
| (Japan) Breasto BTribe Racing | Honda | NSF250R | B | 7 | (Japan) Riku Matsushima | 2–7 |
| (Japan) Marumae Dream Kitakyushu CParis | Honda | NSF250R | B | 8 | (Japan) Hayato Oota | 2–7 |
| (Japan) Team Plusone | Honda | NSF250R | B | 10 | (Japan) Shun Takenaka | 2–7 |
| (Japan) Nozawa Racing Family Malusaka | Honda | NSF250R | B | 16 | (Japan) Hidenori Nozawa | 2–4, 6–7 |
| (Japan) Like a Wind Club Y's | Honda | NSF250R | B | 17 | (Japan) Motonari Matsuda | 2–4, 6–7 |
| (Japan) Plan Bee Racing MTR | Honda | NSF250R | B | 32 | (Japan) Arata Irimoto | 2–6 |
| (Japan) Plan Bee Racing MTR | Honda | NSF250R | B | 6 | (Japan) Masaki Tokudome | 5, 7 |
| (Japan) Team Mari with hiro'ck | Honda | NSF250R | B | 35 | (Japan) Shizuka Fujiwara | 2–4, 7 |
| (Japan) Team Deshi with RG Niwa | Honda | NSF250R | B | 24 | (Japan) Norihiko Murata | 5–6 |
| (Japan) Flex Racing Team & MH OHara | Honda | NSF250R | B | 37 | (Japan) Keiichi Kishida | 6 |
| (Japan) Rairaku Kikaku with RG Niwa | Honda | NSF250R | B | 38 | (Japan) Hiroshi Kaneko | 6–7 |
| (Japan) Astemo SI Racing with Thai Honda (Japan) Astemo SI Racing with RSC | Honda | NSF250R | B | 15 | (Thailand) Thanachat Pratumtong | 2–5 |
| (Japan) Astemo SI Racing with Thai Honda (Japan) Astemo SI Racing with RSC | Honda | NSF250R | B | 30 | (Thailand) Noprutpong Bunprawes | 2–5 |
| (Japan) Astemo SI Racing with Thai Honda (Japan) Astemo SI Racing with RSC | Honda | NSF250R | D | 31 | (Thailand) Techin In-Aphai | 2–7 |
| (Japan) Astemo SI Racing with Thai Honda (Japan) Astemo SI Racing with RSC | Honda | NSF250R | D | 34 | (Japan) Rintaro Todaka | 2–7 |
| (Japan) PMU 7C Galespeed | Honda | NSF250R | D | 1 | (Japan) Hiroki Ono | 2–7 |
| (Japan) PMU 7C Galespeed | Honda | NSF250R | D | 18 | (Japan) Seiryu Ikegami | 4 |
| (Japan) Team Life Honda Dream Kitakyushu | Honda | NSF250R | D | 19 | (Japan) Eito Nakamura | 2–7 |
| (Japan) SDG Jr. 56Racing | Honda | NSF250R | D | 50 | (Japan) Kotaro Togashi | 2–7 |
| (Japan) Battle Factory | Honda | NSF250R | D | 53 | (Japan) Kota Iwano | 2–7 |
| (Japan) Team Power Craft AK1Tech | Honda | NSF250R | D | 55 | (Japan) Rukiya Yamamoto | 6–7 |
| (Japan) Team HRS | Honda | NSF250R | D | 56 | (Japan) Soma Hasegawa | 7 |
| (Japan) MotoUP Racing | Honda | NSF250R | D | 51 | (Japan) Hayato Chishiki | 2–7 |
| (Japan) MotoUP Racing | Honda | NSF250R | D | 52 | (Japan) Waku Kunitate | 2–7 |
| (Japan) MotoUP Racing | Honda | NSF250R | P | 11 | (Japan) Kenshin Nakatani | 2–7 |
| (Japan) MotoUP Racing | Honda | NSF250R | P | 18 | (Japan) Seiryu Ikegami | 3 |
| (Japan) MotoUP Racing | Honda | NSF250R | P | 54 | (Japan) Haruki Matsuyama | 4 |
| (Japan) Kijima Kiss Racing Katsudenki | Honda | NSF250R | P | 9 | (Japan) Shingo Iidaka | 2–5 |
| (Japan) AS71 Academy & Okabe | Honda | NSF250R | P | 36 | (Australia) Archie Schmidt | 3–4 |
| (Japan) WJ-Factory Sanwa Racing B-tribe | Honda | NSF250R | P | 12 | (Japan) Ryota Ogiwara | 4 |
| (Japan) Team Naoko KTM | KTM | RC250R | B | 5 | (Japan) Naoko Takasugi | 2–7 |

Key
Regular rider
S-class rider (Note: Special Participation (特別参加枠) riders, typically aged 12–18 with domestic or junior licenses, may compete in select rounds by invitation but are ineligible for points or prizes, even if they finish in point-scoring positions.)
Replacement rider
Wildcard rider

== Championship standings ==
Scoring system

Points are awarded to the top fifteen finishers. A rider has to finish the race to earn points. The same point system is used across the four classes. Three extra-points are awarded in the final round at the 57th MFJ Grand Prix at Suzuka Circuit.

| Position | 1st | 2nd | 3rd | 4th | 5th | 6th | 7th | 8th | 9th | 10th | 11th | 12th | 13th | 14th | 15th |
| Points (Rd. 1–6) | 25 | 20 | 16 | 13 | 11 | 10 | 9 | 8 | 7 | 6 | 5 | 4 | 3 | 2 | 1 |
| Points (Rd. 7) | 28 | 23 | 19 | 16 | 14 | 13 | 12 | 11 | 10 | 9 | 8 | 7 | 6 | 5 | 4 |

=== Rider standings ===
==== JSB1000 ====
| Pos. | Rider | Bike | MOT (Tochigi Prefecture) | SUG (Miyagi Prefecture) | | MOT (Tochigi Prefecture) | | AUT (Ōita Prefecture) | | OKA (Okayama Prefecture) | SUZ (Mie Prefecture) | | Pts |
| Pos. | Rider | Bike | MOT (Tochigi Prefecture) | R1 | R2 | R1 | R2 | R1 | R2 | OKA (Okayama Prefecture) | R1 | R2 | Pts |
|---|---|---|---|---|---|---|---|---|---|---|---|---|---|
| 1 | (Japan) Katsuyuki Nakasuga | Yamaha | 2 | 1^{F} | 1^{P F} | 2 | 2^{P} | 1^{P F} | 1^{P F} | 1^{F} | DNS | DNS | 185 |
| 2 | (Japan) Ryo Mizuno | Ducati | 1^{P F} | | | 4 | 3 | 11 | 4 | 4^{P} | 1^{F} | 1^{F} | 141 |
| 3 | (Japan) Naomichi Uramoto | BMW | 3^{P} | Ret^{P} | 2 | 1^{F} | 1^{F} | | | | 2^{P} | 2^{P} | 132 |
| 4 | (Japan) Kohta Nozane | Honda | Ret | 2 | Ret | 5^{P} | 17† | 2 | 2 | 2 | 5 | 3 | 124 |
| 5 | (Japan) Kazuki Ito | Honda | 7 | 4 | 4 | 7 | 7 | 5 | 3 | 6 | 9 | 11 | 108 |
| 6 | (Japan) Satoru Iwata | Honda | 8 | 5 | 6 | 6 | 5 | 4 | Ret | 8 | 6 | 4 | 100 |
| 7 | (Japan) Takuya Tsuda | Suzuki | 6 | 9 | 3 | 3 | 14 | 3 | 8 | 5 | 20† | 8 | 97 |
| 8 | (Japan) Tetsuta Nagashima | Honda | Ret | 7 | 7 | 12 | 4 | 7 | 6 | 3 | 14 | 9 | 85 |
| 9 | (Japan) Taro Sekiguchi | BMW | 9 | 10 | 8 | 8 | 9 | 10 | Ret | 11 | 8 | 10 | 67 |
| 10 | (Japan) Kohki Suzuki | Honda | 23 | 6 | 5 | Ret | 8 | 6 | 5 | 7 | | | 59 |
| 11 | (Japan) Yuta Kodama | Yamaha | 10 | 8 | 9 | 9 | 10 | 8 | 7 | 12 | 18 | 15 | 59 |
| 12 | (Japan) Daijiro Hiura | Honda | | 3 | DNS | | | | | | 3 | 6 | 48 |
| 13 | (Japan) Masahiro Shinjo | Kawasaki | 16 | 13 | 12 | 14 | 13 | 14 | 9 | 15 | 12 | 12 | 36 |
| 14 | (Japan) Cocoro Atsumi | Suzuki | | | | | | | | 9 | 4 | 7 | 35 |
| 15 | (Japan) Tomoya Hoshino | BMW | 15 | 11 | 11 | 10 | Ret | 12 | 12 | 10 | 16 | 20† | 31 |
| 16 | (Japan) Kazuma Tsuda | Yamaha | 12 | 12 | 10 | 11 | 11 | 19† | 11 | 14 | Ret | DNS | 31 |
| 17 | (Japan) Keito Abe | Honda | | | | | | | | 19† | 7 | 5 | 26 |
| 18 | (Japan) Tatsuya Nakamura | Kawasaki | 17 | 19† | 17 | 13 | 15 | 9 | 10 | Ret | 10 | Ret | 26 |
| 19 | (Japan) Teppei Nagoe | Honda | 5 | Ret | DNS | Ret | 6 | 18† | DNS | | | | 21 |
| 20 | (Japan) Takumi Takahashi | Honda | 4 | | | | | | | | | | 13 |
| 21 | (Japan) Shinichi Nakatomi | Yamaha | 18 | 14 | 14 | DNQ | DNQ | 13 | 13 | 13 | 21† | DNS | 13 |
| 22 | (Japan) Yuki Sugiyama | Honda | 13 | 15 | 13 | 16 | 12 | 15 | Ret | 17 | 19 | 18 | 12 |
| 23 | (Japan) Hideyuki Ogata | Suzuki | | | | | | | | DNQ | 13 | 13 | 12 |
| 24 | (Japan) Ainosuke Yoshida | BMW | DNS | 18 | 18 | Ret | 16 | 16 | 14 | 18 | 11 | 19† | 10 |
| 25 | (Japan) Takuma Kunimine | Honda | 11 | | | | | | | | | | 5 |
| 26 | (Japan) Hinata Nakajima | BMW | 19 | | | | | | | 16 | DNS | 14 | 5 |
| 27 | (Japan) Yoshiyuki Sugai | Honda | 21 | 17 | 16 | 15 | 18† | | | | 15 | 16 | 5 |
| 28 | (Japan) Kohta Arakawa | Honda | 14 | | | | | | | | | | 2 |
| 29 | (Japan) Kota Higuchi | Suzuki | | | | | | 17 | 15 | | 17 | 17 | 1 |
| 30 | (Japan) Yuta Okaya | Aprilia | 22 | 16 | 15 | | | | | | | | 1 |
| 31 | (Japan) Kousuke Sakumoto | Honda | 20 | 18 | | | | | | | | | 0 |
| 32 | (Japan) Yuto Sano | Kawasaki | 24† | | | | | | | | | | 0 |
| | (Japan) Rei Toshima | Yamaha | Ret | | | | | | | | | | 0 |
| | (Japan) Riku Sugawara | Yamaha | Ret | | | | | | | | | | 0 |
| | (Japan) Takafumi Kato | Honda | DNS | | | | | | | | | | 0 |

| Colour | Result |
|---|---|
| Gold | Winner |
| Silver | Second place |
| Bronze | Third place |
| Green | Points classification |
| Blue | Non-points classification |
| Blue | Non-classified finish (NC) |
| Purple | Retired, not classified (Ret) |
| Red | Did not qualify (DNQ) |
| Red | Did not pre-qualify (DNPQ) |
| Black | Disqualified (DSQ) |
| White | Did not start (DNS) |
| White | Withdrew (WD) |
| White | Race cancelled (C) |
| Blank | Did not practice (DNP) |
| Blank | Did not arrive (DNA) |
| Blank | Excluded (EX) |

P – Pole position
F – Fastest lap

Notes:

- † – Rider did not finish the race, but was classified as he completed more than ~75% of the race distance.

==== ST1000 ====
| Pos. | Rider | Bike | SUG (Miyagi Prefecture) | MOT (Tochigi Prefecture) | | AUT‡ (Ōita Prefecture) | OKA (Okayama Prefecture) | SUZ (Mie Prefecture) | Pts |
| Pos. | Rider | Bike | SUG (Miyagi Prefecture) | R1 | R2 | AUT‡ (Ōita Prefecture) | OKA (Okayama Prefecture) | SUZ (Mie Prefecture) | Pts |
|---|---|---|---|---|---|---|---|---|---|
| 1 | (Japan) Taiga Hada | Honda | 7 | 1^{F} | 1^{F} | 2 | 1 | 3 | 113 |
| 2 | (Japan) Yudai Kamei | Honda | 1 | 3^{P} | 4^{P} | 3 | 3^{P} | 18 | 78 |
| 3 | (Japan) Takuma Kunimine | Honda | 3^{P} | 2 | 19† | 1^{P} | 2 | Ret^{P} | 68.5 |
| 4 | (Japan) Shota Ite | Yamaha | 5 | Ret | 7 | 15 | 4 | 1^{F} | 61.5 |
| 5 | (Japan) Kohta Arakawa | Honda | 9 | 5 | 3 | 10 | Ret | 2 | 60 |
| 6 | (Thailand) Nakarin Atiratphuvapat | Honda | 2^{F} | | | 6 | 5 | 4 | 52 |
| 7 | (Japan) Rei Toshima | Yamaha | 21† | 6 | 6 | 5 | 8 | 7 | 45.5 |
| 8 | (Japan) Sho Nishimura | Honda | 17 | 16† | 2 | 9 | 11^{F} | 5 | 42.5 |
| 9 | (Japan) Takeru Murase | Suzuki | 16 | 4 | 5 | 4 | 10 | 14 | 41.5 |
| 10 | (Japan) Ruka Wada | Aprilia | 19 | 7 | 10 | 7 | 6 | 8 | 40.5 |
| 11 | (Japan) Ryosuke Iwato | Kawasaki | 8 | 15† | 11 | 8 | 7 | 13 | 33 |
| 12 | (Japan) Motoharu Ito | Honda | 4 | Ret | 9 | 12 | | 9 | 32 |
| 13 | (Japan) Yuto Sano | Kawasaki | 15 | 9 | 13 | 13 | 12 | 6 | 29.5 |
| 14 | (Japan) Gun Mie | Kawasaki | 11 | 14† | 12 | 14 | 9 | 10 | 28 |
| 15 | (Japan) Kosuke Sakumoto | Honda | 6 | Ret | 8 | 11 | Ret | 19† | 20.5 |
| 16 | (Japan) Akito Haga | Aprilia | 20 | 8 | 20† | 17 | 14 | 12 | 17 |
| 17 | (Japan) Sota Furuyama | Yamaha | 10 | | | | 13 | DNS | 9 |
| 18 | (Japan) Masaki Yamanaka | Honda | | | | | | 11 | 8 |
| 19 | (Japan) Hikaru Yoshihiro | Honda | | 10 | 14 | | | | 8 |
| 20 | (United States) Zechariah Dzegede | BMW | 18 | 11 | 15 | 23 | 19 | 16 | 6 |
| 21 | (Japan) Yasuhiro Matsukawa | Honda | 14 | Ret | 16 | 18 | 18 | 15 | 6 |
| 22 | (Japan) Naoyuki Sato | Yamaha | DNS | 12 | 18 | 22 | 21 | 17 | 4 |
| 23 | (Japan) Masaaki Takada | Yamaha | 12 | | | | | | 4 |
| 24 | (Japan) Michiyasu Matsumura | Yamaha | | 13 | Ret | | | | 3 |
| 25 | (Japan) Hisami Arai | Yamaha | 13 | Ret | 17 | 24 | 22 | 20† | 3 |
| 26 | (Japan) Yoshiyuki Hayashi | Yamaha | | | | | 15 | Ret | 1 |
| 27 | (Japan) Isami Higashimura | BMW | | | | | 16 | 21† | 0 |
| 28 | (Japan) Mitsuhiro Yoshida | Honda | | | | 16 | | | 0 |
| 29 | (Japan) Kazumasa Seki | Honda | | | | | 17 | | 0 |
| 30 | (Japan) Takashi Arase | Honda | | | | 19 | | | 0 |
| 31 | (Japan) Hiromasa Okada | Honda | | | | 20 | | | 0 |
| 32 | (Japan) Yutaka Murase | Honda | | | | | 20 | | 0 |
| 33 | (Japan) Tsukasa Murata | Honda | | | | 21 | 23† | | 0 |
| | (Australia) Jonathan Nahlous | Yamaha | | Ret | Ret | | | | 0 |
| | (Japan) Masaki Adachi | Yamaha | | | | | Ret | | 0 |
| | (Japan) Taichi Honda | Yamaha | | | | | Ret | DNQ | 0 |
| | (Japan) Nobutaka Tanimoto | Yamaha | | | | | DNS | | 0 |

| Colour | Result |
|---|---|
| Gold | Winner |
| Silver | Second place |
| Bronze | Third place |
| Green | Points classification |
| Blue | Non-points classification |
| Blue | Non-classified finish (NC) |
| Purple | Retired, not classified (Ret) |
| Red | Did not qualify (DNQ) |
| Red | Did not pre-qualify (DNPQ) |
| Black | Disqualified (DSQ) |
| White | Did not start (DNS) |
| White | Withdrew (WD) |
| White | Race cancelled (C) |
| Blank | Did not practice (DNP) |
| Blank | Did not arrive (DNA) |
| Blank | Excluded (EX) |

P – Pole position
F – Fastest lap

Notes:

- † – Rider did not finish the race, but was classified as he completed more than ~75% of the race distance.
- ‡ – Half points were awarded based on the qualifying results at the Autopolis round, after the race was cancelled due to low visibility.

==== ST600 ====
| Pos. | Rider | Bike | SUG (Miyagi Prefecture) | | MOT (Tochigi Prefecture) | AUT‡ (Ōita Prefecture) | OKA (Okayama Prefecture) | SUZ (Mie Prefecture) | Pts |
| Pos. | Rider | Bike | R1 | R2 (Note: Two-thirds points were awarded as Sportsland Sugo Race 2 was red-flagged twice; the original 15-lap race was interrupted on lap 11 and subsequently restarted for 10 laps. The restart was again red-flagged on lap 7, and final results were taken from the last completed lap.) | MOT (Tochigi Prefecture) | AUT‡ (Ōita Prefecture) | OKA (Okayama Prefecture) | SUZ (Mie Prefecture) | Pts |
|---|---|---|---|---|---|---|---|---|---|
| 1 | (Japan) Yuta Date | Yamaha | 2 | 3 | 1 | 1^{P} | 3 | 5 | 98.2 |
| 2 | (Japan) Soichiro Minamimoto | Yamaha | 1^{P} | 2 | 3 | 5 | 5 | 3 | 89.8 |
| 3 | (Japan) Kengo Nagao | Yamaha | 3^{F} | 6^{P} | 22^{P F} | 3 | 1^{F} | 1^{F} | 83.7 |
| 4 | (Japan) Tomoyoshi Koyama | Honda | 11 | 8 | 4 | 2 | 2^{P} | 2 | 76.3 |
| 5 | (Japan) Rei Matsuoka | Yamaha | 4 | 5 | 2 | 7 | 4 | 4^{P} | 73.8 |
| 6 | (Japan) Tetsuya Fujita | Honda | 5 | 1^{F} | 5 | 4 | 8 | 15 | 57.2 |
| 7 | (Japan) Takumi Takahashi | Yamaha | 10 | 10 | 6 | 6 | 7 | 11 | 42 |
| 8 | (Japan) Toshiki Senda | Honda | 14 | 11 | 8 | 8 | 9 | 7 | 36.3 |
| 9 | (Japan) Keisuke Tanaka | Yamaha | 12 | 7 | 7 | 11 | Ret | 6 | 34.5 |
| 10 | (Japan) Amon Odaki | Honda | 6 | 9 | 27† | 10 | 6 | 14 | 32.7 |
| 11 | (Japan) Ren Okabe | Yamaha | 9 | 13 | 9 | 12 | Ret | 8 | 29 |
| 12 | (Japan) Riku Sugawara | Yamaha | 7 | 12 | Ret | | 19 | 9 | 21.7 |
| 13 | (Japan) Kai Aota | Honda | 13 | Ret | 11 | 9 | WD | 10 | 20.5 |
| 14 | (Japan) Ryota Ogiwara | Honda | 8 | 4 | | | | | 16.7 |
| 15 | (Japan) Kanta Hamada | Honda | | | 13 | 15 | 14 | 12 | 12.5 |
| 16 | (Japan) Shoma Yamane | Yamaha | 20 | 17 | 10 | | 10 | 16 | 12 |
| 17 | (Japan) Genki Nakajima | Honda | 21 | 16 | 15 | 16 | 13 | 13 | 10 |
| 18 | (Japan) Takuto Suzuki | Honda | 16 | 14 | | | 12 | 23 | 5.3 |
| 19 | (Japan) Tatsuya Yamaguchi | Yamaha | | | | | 11 | | 5 |
| 20 | (Japan) Shuichiro Nakamura | Honda | 17 | 15 | 12 | | | | 4.7 |
| 21 | (Japan) Sho Tokuda | Honda | 28 | 25 | 19 | 13 | 15 | 20 | 2.5 |
| 22 | (Japan) Kouga Matsumoto | Honda | | | 14 | | 17 | 18 | 2 |
| 23 | (Japan) Aoi Uezu | Yamaha | 18 | 19 | 21 | 14 | 18 | 17 | 1 |
| 24 | (Japan) Sota Horii | Yamaha | 15 | 24 | 26† | | | | 1 |
| 25 | (Japan) Rui Kusu | Honda | DNS | DNS | 16 | 17 | 16 | 19 | 0 |
| 26 | (Japan) Yosuke Hosaka | Yamaha | 24 | 20 | 17 | | | | 0 |
| 27 | (Japan) Shota Yokoyama | Yamaha | 19 | 18 | | | | | 0 |
| 28 | (Japan) Syuu Yamato | Honda | 22 | 21 | 20 | 18 | | | 0 |
| 29 | (Japan) Kou Yamamoto | Yamaha | | | 18 | | | | 0 |
| 30 | (Japan) Yushin Sakamoto | Honda | | | | 19 | | | 0 |
| 31 | (Japan) Yoshihiro Toyohara | Yamaha | | | | 20 | 22 | | 0 |
| 32 | (Japan) Anjyu Kasai | Honda | | | | | 20 | 24 | 0 |
| 33 | (Japan) Shun Miyazaki | Honda | 26 | Ret | 24 | 21 | 21 | | 0 |
| 34 | (Japan) Shogo Kawasaki | Yamaha | | | | | | 21 | 0 |
| 35 | (Japan) Shinya Mikami | Yamaha | 23 | 22 | 23 | | | | 0 |
| 36 | (Japan) Fumito Iwanami | Honda | | | | 22 | | | 0 |
| 37 | (Japan) Takanori Kawamoto | Honda | | | | | | 22 | 0 |
| 38 | (Japan) Yuta Tarusawa | Yamaha | Ret | DNS | 25 | 23 | Ret | | 0 |
| 39 | (Japan) Toshiro Miyawaki | Yamaha | 27 | 23 | | | | | 0 |
| 40 | (Japan) Tatsuya Watabe | Yamaha | 25 | Ret | | | | | 0 |
| | (Japan) Seigo Nakashima | Kawasaki | | | | | DNQ | | 0 |
| | (Japan) Masaki Fukushima | Yamaha | | | | | DNQ | | 0 |
| | (Japan) Keisuke Tsukahara | Honda | | | | | WD | | 0 |

| Colour | Result |
|---|---|
| Gold | Winner |
| Silver | Second place |
| Bronze | Third place |
| Green | Points classification |
| Blue | Non-points classification |
| Blue | Non-classified finish (NC) |
| Purple | Retired, not classified (Ret) |
| Red | Did not qualify (DNQ) |
| Red | Did not pre-qualify (DNPQ) |
| Black | Disqualified (DSQ) |
| White | Did not start (DNS) |
| White | Withdrew (WD) |
| White | Race cancelled (C) |
| Blank | Did not practice (DNP) |
| Blank | Did not arrive (DNA) |
| Blank | Excluded (EX) |

P – Pole position
F – Fastest lap

Notes:

- † – Rider did not finish the race, but was classified as he completed more than ~75% of the race distance.
- ‡ – Half points were awarded based on the qualifying results at the Autopolis round, after the race was cancelled due to low visibility.

==== J-GP3 ====
| Pos. | Rider | Bike | SUG (Miyagi Prefecture) | TSU (Ibaraki Prefecture) | | MOT (Tochigi Prefecture) | AUT‡ (Ōita Prefecture) | OKA (Okayama Prefecture) | SUZ (Mie Prefecture) | Pts |
| Pos. | Rider | Bike | SUG (Miyagi Prefecture) | R1 | R2 | MOT (Tochigi Prefecture) | AUT‡ (Ōita Prefecture) | OKA (Okayama Prefecture) | SUZ (Mie Prefecture) | Pts |
|---|---|---|---|---|---|---|---|---|---|---|
| 1 | (Japan) Hiroki Ono | Honda | 2^{P F} | 1^{P} | 1^{P} | 1^{P} | 1^{P} | 1^{F} | 2 | 155.5 |
| 2 | (Japan) Kenshin Nakatani | Honda | 5 | 5 | 4 | 4 | 3 | 2^{P} | 1^{P F} | 104 |
| 3 | (Japan) Shizuka Okazaki | Honda | 9 | 2^{F} | 8 | Ret | 5 | 3 | 3 | 75.5 |
| 4 | (Japan) Rei Wakamatsu | Honda | 1 | 19† | 2^{F} | 2^{F} | 4 | | DNS | 71.5 |
| 5 | (Japan) Hayato Oota | Honda | 3 | 7 | 10 | 9 | 12 | 9 | 5 | 61 |
| 6 | (Japan) Naoko Takasugi | KTM | 16 | 4 | 3 | Ret | 2 | 6 | 10 | 58 |
| 7 | (Japan) Riku Matsushima | Honda | 10 | 3 | 7 | 14 | 7 | Ret | 7 | 49.5 |
| 8 | (Japan) Eito Nakamura | Honda | 6 | 11 | 15 | 13 | 13 | 7 | 6 | 42.5 |
| 9 | (Japan) Motonari Matsuda | Honda | 8 | 9 | 14 | Ret | | 13 | 4 | 36 |
| 10 | (Japan) Shingo Iidaka | Honda | 12 | 6 | 9 | 5 | 8 | | | 36 |
| 11 | (Japan) Shun Takenaka | Honda | 19† | Ret | 5 | 20† | 6 | 8 | 8 | 35 |
| 12 | (Thailand) Thanachat Pratumtong | Honda | 11 | 10 | 12 | 11 | 15 | | | 20.5 |
| 13 | (Japan) Ryota Ogiwara | Honda | | | | 3 | | | | 16 |
| 14 | (Thailand) Techin In-Aphai | Honda | 13 | Ret | 23 | 17 | 17 | 12 | 11 | 15 |
| 15 | (Thailand) Noprutpong Bunprawes | Honda | 4 | Ret | 18 | DNS | 18 | | | 13 |
| 16 | (Japan) Rintaro Todaka | Honda | Ret | Ret | 17 | 15 | 16 | 11 | 14 | 11 |
| 17 | (Japan) Hidenori Nozawa | Honda | 15 | 12 | 19 | 12 | | 14 | 18 | 11 |
| 18 | (Japan) Seiryu Ikegami | Honda | | DSQ | DSQ | 7 | | | | 9 |
| 20 | (Japan) Shizuka Fujiwara | Honda | 14 | 15 | 22 | Ret | | | 20 | 3 |
| 21 | (Japan) Masaki Tokudome | Honda | | | | | 11 | | 16 | 2.5 |
| 22 | (Australia) Archie Schmidt | Honda | | 14 | 20 | Ret | | | | 2 |
| 23 | (Japan) Hiroshi Kaneko | Honda | | | | | | 17 | 15 | 1 |
| 24 | (Japan) Arata Irimoto | Honda | 18 | 16 | DSQ | 19 | 20 | Ret | | 0 |
| 25 | (Japan) Keiichi Kishida | Honda | | | | | | 16 | | 0 |
| 26 | (Japan) Norihiko Murata | Honda | | | | | 19 | 18 | | 0 |
Special Participation riders ineligible for points
| | (Japan) Hayato Chishiki | Honda | 7 | 8 | 13 | 8 | 9 | 4 | | |
| | (Japan) Kotaro Togashi | Honda | Ret | 17 | 11 | 6 | 10 | 5 | 13 | |
| | (Japan) Waku Kunitate | Honda | 20† | 13 | 16 | 16 | 14 | 10 | 12 | |
| | (Japan) Soma Hasegawa | Honda | | | | | | | 9 | |
| | (Japan) Haruki Matsuyama | Honda | | | | 10 | | | | |
| | (Japan) Kota Iwano | Honda | 17 | Ret | 21 | 18 | 21 | 15 | 17 | |
| | (Japan) Rukiya Yamamoto | Honda | | | | | | Ret | 19 | |

| Colour | Result |
|---|---|
| Gold | Winner |
| Silver | Second place |
| Bronze | Third place |
| Green | Points classification |
| Blue | Non-points classification |
| Blue | Non-classified finish (NC) |
| Purple | Retired, not classified (Ret) |
| Red | Did not qualify (DNQ) |
| Red | Did not pre-qualify (DNPQ) |
| Black | Disqualified (DSQ) |
| White | Did not start (DNS) |
| White | Withdrew (WD) |
| White | Race cancelled (C) |
| Blank | Did not practice (DNP) |
| Blank | Did not arrive (DNA) |
| Blank | Excluded (EX) |

P – Pole position
F – Fastest lap

Notes:

- † – Rider did not finish the race, but was classified as he completed more than ~75% of the race distance.
- ‡ – Half points were awarded based on the qualifying results at the Autopolis round, after the race was cancelled due to low visibility.
