= Veoneer =

Automotive tech manufacturer

Veoneer HoldCo, LLC
- Type: Private
- Industry: Automotive
- Founded: 2018; 8 years ago
- Headquarters: Southfield, USA
- Key people: Nik Endrud, CEO
- Products: Restraint Control Systems
- Revenue: US$2.3 billion
- Owner: American Industrial Partners
- Number of employees: 2,200
- Website: www.veoneer.com

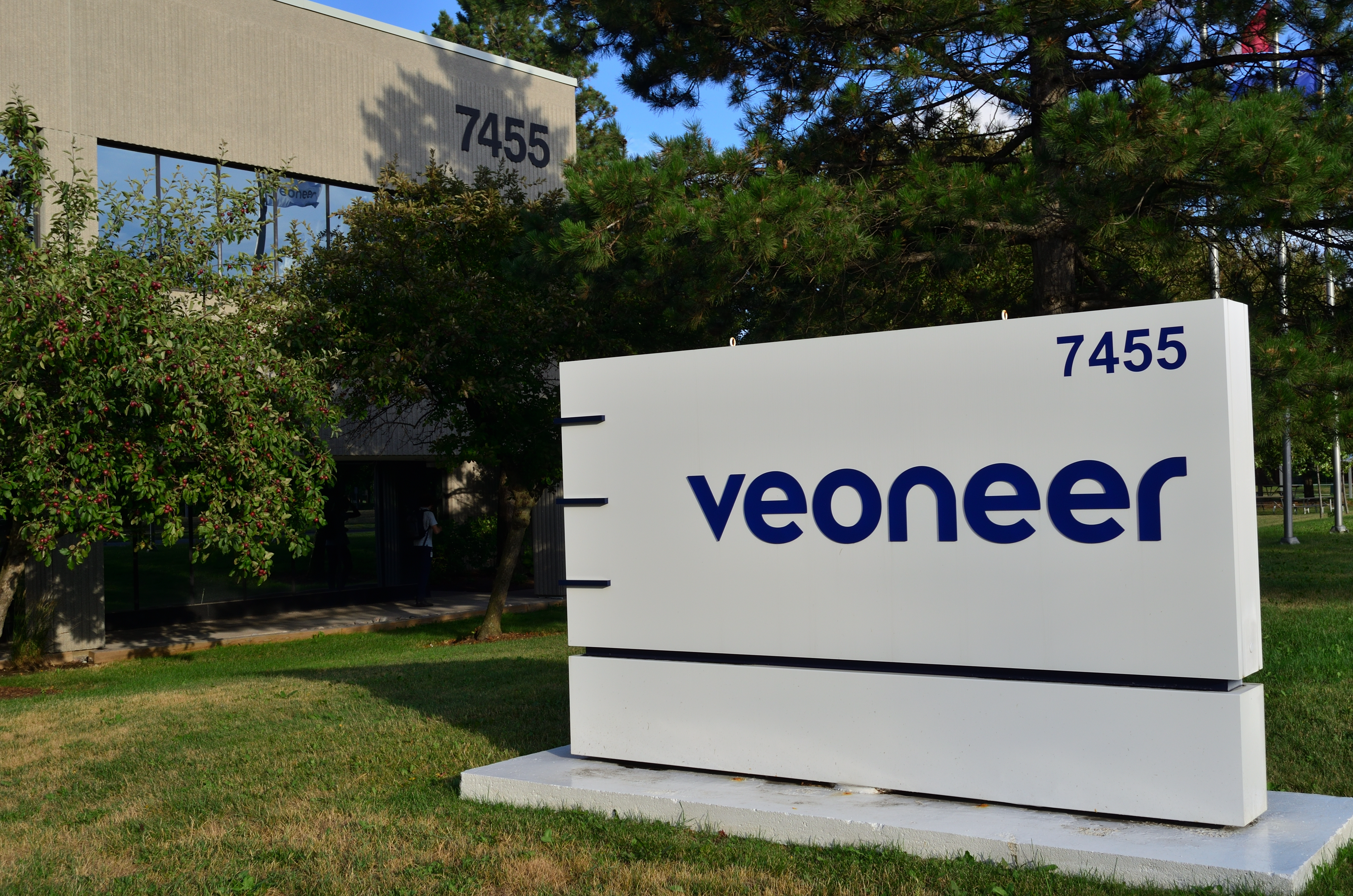
Veoneer in Canada

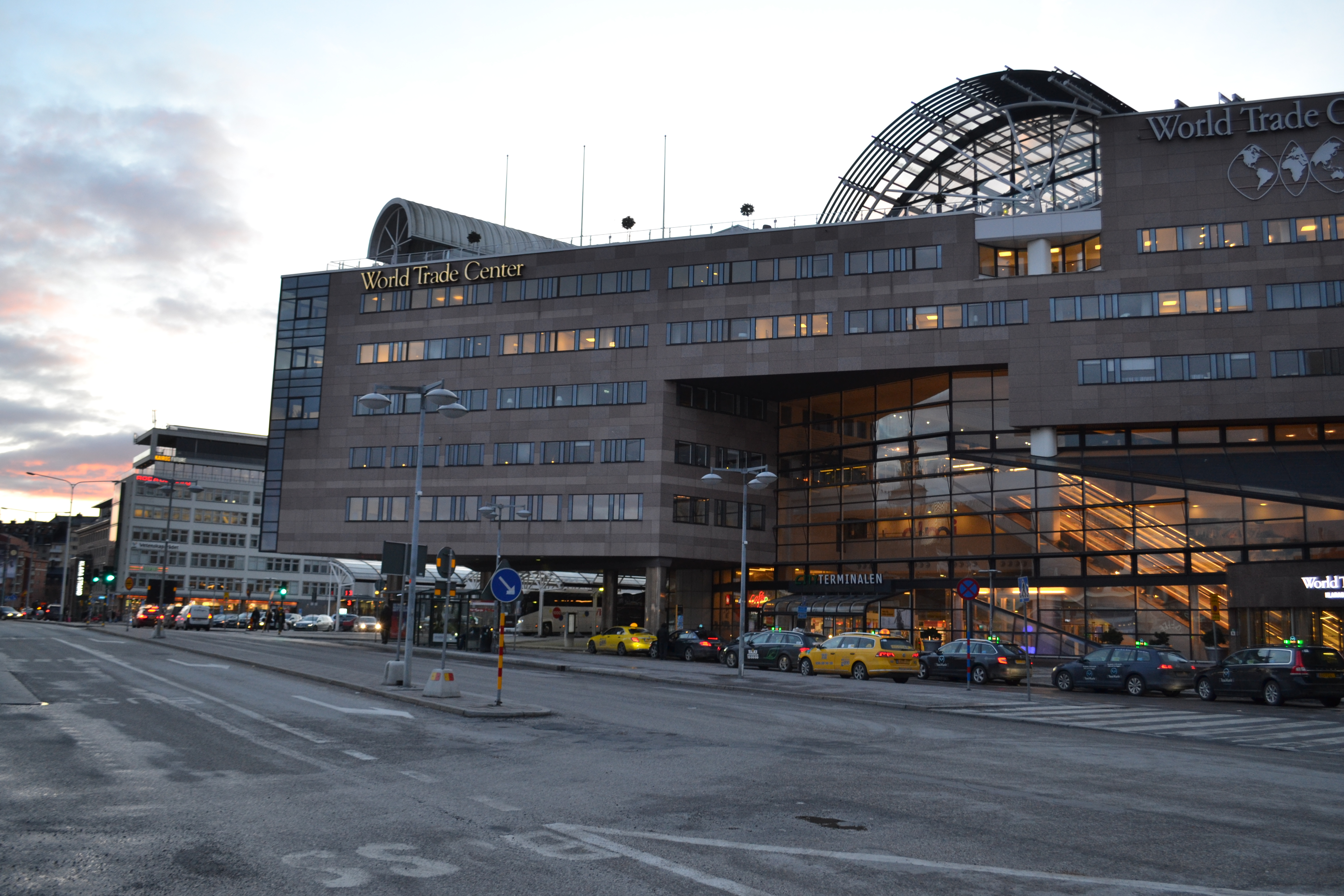
Veoneer's headquarters at Klarabergsviadukten 70, Stockholm

Veoneer is an American-Swedish automotive technology provider headquartered in Stockholm, Sweden and incorporated in Delaware, United States as Veoneer HoldCo, LLC. The company is the result of a spin-off in 2018 of Autoliv's electronics and automated driving divisions.

In 2019, Veoneer acquired high-performance brakes maker Nissin Kogyo's 49% stake in the Veoneer-Nissin Joint Venture's US operation. Veoneer's products include radars, lidars, thermal night vision cameras, vision systems and advanced driver assistance and autonomous driving software. Veoneer counts all major global automakers as its customers.

The company also provides night driving assist systems, active safety sensors, mono-and stereo-vision cameras, airbag control units and crash sensors.

In October 2021, Qualcomm and SSW Partners reached an agreement to buy Veoneer for $4.5 billion. As part of the deal, SSW Partners would sell Veoneer's Arriver business to Qualcomm. The acquisition closed in April 2022. In June 2022, Bloomberg News reported that SSW Partners had started to prepare work on divesting the remainder of Veoneer's businesses. In December 2022, it was announced SSW Partners had sold Veoneer's active safety portion to the Aurora-headquartered automotive parts manufacturer, Magna International for $1.52 billion USD.

In December 2023, American Industrial Partners Capital Fund VII (AIP Fund VII) completed the acquisition of Veoneer's Restraint Control Systems business from SSW Partners LP. This transaction concluded the strategic divestiture of Veoneer's three principal divisions, aiming to find suitable long-term stakeholders for each. The other two divisions, Arriver Software and Active Safety, were previously acquired by Qualcomm and Magna International, respectively. The sale to AIP Fund VII represents the final phase in the restructuring process initiated by Veoneer and SSW Partners LP.

== See also ==
- Self-driving car
