= Amon Odaki =

Japanese motorcycle racer (born 2007)

Amon Odaki 小田喜 阿門
- Born: 17 December 2007 (age 18); Itabashi, Tokyo, Japan
- Nationality: Japanese
- Current team: SDG Harc-Pro
- Bike number: 10
Statistics
All Japan ST600
Active years	2025–
Championships	0
Manufacturer	Honda
Last season (2026)	5th (60 pts)
Starts / Wins / Podiums / Poles / F. laps / Points; 11 / 1 / 2 / 0 / 0 / 92.7
All Japan J-GP3
Active years	2020–2023
Championships	0
Manufacturer	Honda
Team(s)	56Racing
Starts / Wins / Podiums / Poles / F. laps / Points; 10 / 0 / 0 / 0 / 0 / 23

Amon Odaki (Japanese: 小田喜 阿門, Hepburn: Odaki Amon; born 17 December 2007) is a Japanese motorcycle racer who competes in the ST600 class of the All Japan Road Race Championship for SDG Harc-Pro, aboard a Honda CBR600RR.

Odaki competed in the 2024 FIM JuniorGP World Championship for the Asia Talent Team, after graduating from the Asia Talent Cup—having participated in the series in 2022 and 2023—where he finished as championship runner-up in his second year. He was part of Shinya Nakano's rider development program between 2020 and 2024.

== Career ==
=== Early career ===
Born in the Itabashi ward of Tokyo, Japan, Odaki began riding pocketbikes at the age of eight. During his early years, he competed in pocketbike championships in Japan, and entered the Daijiro Cup in 2017. In 2018, Odaki clinched several podiums in the Daijiro Cup.

=== All Japan Road Race Championship ===
==== J-GP3 (2020–2023) ====
In 2020, after participating in Kanto Road Mini Championship races on an NSF100, where he clinched wins and podiums, Odaki entered the Tsukuba Road Race Championship GP3 class, aboard a Honda NSF250R. During qualifying practice, he set the third best lap-time, but crashed out in the race. In October, Odaki made his All Japan Road Race Championship debut in the Motegi round of the J-GP3 class, at only 12 years old, becoming the youngest ever rider to participate in an All Japan race. He qualified 15th and finished his debut race in 13th place.

In 2021, Odaki competed in the All Japan as a full-time rider, in the J-GP3 class, for Shinya Nakano's 56Racing team which he had been part of since 2020. He scored two top ten finishes and had his best result in the opening round at Motegi, after finishing in eighth place. He did not register any championship points due to competing under a Special Participation license. Following his participation in the Asia Talent Cup in 2022, Odaki competed as a wildcard in the Tsukuba round of the J-GP3 class, where he finished in eighth spot. In 2023, Odaki competed in the first three races of the J-GP3 season, balancing his domestic and international participations, and clinched ninth and eighth place finishes at Motegi and Tsukuba, respectively.

=== Asia Talent Cup (2022–2023) ===
Following his performance in Japan, Odaki was selected to participate in the Asia Talent Cup for the 2022 season, at the age of 14. In his debut in the Cup at Lusail, he set pole position and after a third place in Race 1, Odaki clinched his maiden win in the second weekend race. He set pole position again in the second round at Mandalika, where he scored a fourth place in Race 2. Following mixed results across the rest of the season, he finished seventh overall in the standings.

In 2023, Odaki faced his second season in the Cup. He clinched his first podium of the season in the second round at Motegi, having started from pole position. He would finish on the podium in the next four races before clinching his first season win at Sepang. After a third place in the closing race at Lusail, Odaki was ranked second in the standings, behind champion Veda Pratama and ahead of compatriot Ryota Ogiwara.

=== JuniorGP World Championship (2024) ===
After his Asia Talent Cup stint, Odaki was chosen to compete in the FIM JuniorGP World Championship for the 2024 season, racing with the Asia Talent Team as part of the Honda ladder. He picked up a few points in the first rounds and closed his season in Europe with a best-place finish of 11th at Estoril.

=== All Japan Road Race Championship ===
==== ST600 (2025–) ====
Following his stint in Asia and Europe, Odaki returned to the All Japan Road Race Championship in 2025, where he competed in the ST600 class, for SDG Harc-Pro. He scored a sixth place in his debut race at Sugo, and fought for the podium spots during the Motegi race before crashing out after a collision with Soichiro Minamimoto. He finished tenth overall in his rookie season aboard the CBR600RR.

In July 2025, Odaki participated in the Asia Road Racing Championship as a wildcard, in the Supersport 600 class, with his All Japan team SDG Harc Pro. He finished ninth and eighth in races 1 and 2, respectively.

Odaki remained in the category with the same team for 2026, where he clinched his maiden victory in the opening race at Sugo, followed by a retirement after a crash in Race 2.

== Career statistics ==
=== Motegi Road Race Championship ===
==== Races by year ====
(key) (Races in bold indicate pole position; races in italics indicate fastest lap)

Year	Class	Bike	1	2	3	4	Pos	Pts
2020	J-GP3	Honda	MOT1	MOT2	MOT3	**MOT4**; 1	6th	20

=== Tsukuba Road Race Championship ===
==== Races by year ====
(key) (Races in bold indicate pole position; races in italics indicate fastest lap. Superscript numbers indicate overall results, including both national and international classes.)

Year	Class	Bike	1	2	3	4	Pos	Pts
2020	J-GP3 (Note: National class.)	Honda	TSU1	TSU2	TSU3; Ret	TSU4	NC	0
2021	J-GP3	Honda	TSU1; 2^{4}	TSU2; Ret	TSU3	TSU4	8th	20
2022	J-GP3 (Note: International class.)	Honda	TSU1	TSU2; 1^{2}	TSU3	TSU4	1st	25

=== Suzuka Sunday Road Race ===
==== Races by year ====
(key) (Races in bold indicate pole position; races in italics indicate fastest lap. Superscript numbers indicate overall results, including both national and international classes.)

Year	Class	Bike	1	2	3	4	5	Pos	Pts
2021	J-GP3	Honda	SUZ1; 2^{4}	SUZ2; 2^{5}	SUZ3; Ret	SUZ4; Ret	SUZ5; 1^{1}	3rd	68

=== All Japan Road Race Championship ===
==== Races by year ====
(key) (Races in bold indicate pole position; races in italics indicate fastest lap)

Year	Class	Bike	1	2	3	4	5	6	7	Pos	Pts
2020	J-GP3	Honda	SUG	OKA	AUT	MOT; 13	SUZ			NC (Note: Competed under a Special Participation license which is ineligible for points.)	-
2021	J-GP3	Honda	MOT; 8	SUG; 12	TSU1; 9	TSU2; 11	SUZ; 11	OKA	AUT	NC	-
2022	J-GP3	Honda	MOT	SUG	TSU; 8	AUT	OKA	SUZ		21st	8
2023	J-GP3	Honda	MOT; 9	SUG; Ret	TSU; 8	AUT	OKA	SUZ		14th	15
2025	ST600	Honda	SUG1; 6	SUG2; 9	MOT; 27†	AUT; 10‡	OKA; 6	SUZ; 14		10th	32.7
2026	ST600	Honda	SUG1; 1	SUG2; Ret	AUT; 2	MOT; 8	OKA; 25	SUZ; 12		5th	60

- † – Rider did not finish the race, but was classified as he completed more than 75% of the race distance.
- ‡ – Half points were awarded based on the qualifying results.

=== Asia Talent Cup ===
==== Races by year ====
(key) (Races in bold indicate pole position; races in italics indicate fastest lap)

Year	Bike	1		2		3		4		5		6		Pos	Pts
Year	Bike	R1	R2	R1	R2	R1	R2	R1	R2	R1	R2	R1	R2	Pos	Pts
2022	Honda	**LUS**; 3	**LUS**; 1	**MAN**; Ret	**MAN**; 4	MOT; 7	MOT; C	BUR; 17	BUR; 13	SEP; 5	SEP; Ret	MAN; 8	MAN; 12	7th	89
2023	Honda	SEP; 4	SEP; Ret	**MOT**; 3	**MOT**; Ret	MAN; 2	MAN; 3	BUR; 3	BUR; 2	SEP; 1	SEP; 5	LUS; Ret	LUS; 3	2nd	153

=== FIM JuniorGP World Championship ===
==== Races by year ====
(key) (Races in bold indicate pole position; races in italics indicate fastest lap)

Year	Bike	1	2	3	4	5	6	7	8	9	10	11	12	Pos	Pts
2024	Honda	MIS; Ret	MIS; 14	EST1; DNQ	BAR; 23	BAR; 14	ALG; 13	ALG; 24	JER; 21	JER; 23	ARA; 14	EST2; 25	EST2; 11	23rd	14

=== Asia Road Racing Championship ===
==== Races by year ====
(key) (Races in bold indicate pole position; races in italics indicate fastest lap)

Year	Class	Bike	1		2		3		4		5		6		Pos	Pts
Year	Class	Bike	R1	R2	R1	R2	R1	R2	R1	R2	R1	R2	R1	R2	Pos	Pts
2025	SS600	Honda	BUR	BUR	SEP	SEP	MOT; 9	MOT; 8	MAN	MAN	SEP	SEP	BUR	BUR	19th	15
