= Teppei Nagoe =

Japanese motorcycle racer (born 1997)

Teppei Nagoe 名越 哲平
- Born: 5 September 1997 (age 29); Edogawa, Tokyo, Japan
- Nationality: Japanese
- Bike number: 56

Championship titles
- All Japan J-GP2 (2019)
Statistics
All Japan JSB1000
Active years	2021–2025
Championships	0
Manufacturer	Honda
Best season (2023)	4th (154 pts)
Starts / Wins / Podiums / Poles / F. laps / Points; 42 / 0 / 7 / 0 / 1 / 410.5
All Japan J-GP2
Active years	2018–2019
Championships	1
Manufacturer	Harc-Pro
Best season (2019)	1st (160 pts)
Starts / Wins / Podiums / Poles / F. laps / Points; 13 / 4 / 9 / 6 / 5 / 271
All Japan ST1000
Active years	2020, 2026
Championships	0
Manufacturer	Honda
Best season (2020)	2nd (75 pts)
Starts / Wins / Podiums / Poles / F. laps / Points; 10 / 2 / 5 / 1 / 1 / 151
All Japan ST600
Active years	2015–2017
Championships	0
Manufacturer	Honda
Best season (2016)	3rd (79 pts)
Starts / Wins / Podiums / Poles / F. laps / Points; 16 / 1 / 3 / 0 / 0 / 195

Teppei Nagoe (Japanese: 名越 哲平, Hepburn: Nagoe Teppei; born 5 September 1997) is a Japanese former motorcycle racer. He was the All Japan Road Race J-GP2 class champion in 2019, and later competed in the premier JSB1000 class between 2021 and 2025.

Nagoe won the 2024 Suzuka 8 Hours alongside Takumi Takahashi and Johann Zarco. He also competed in three Grands Prix of the Moto2 World Championship in 2019. He was the first rider to be selected for Shinya Nakano's 56Racing development program.

== Career ==
=== Early career ===
Born in Edogawa, Nagoe won his first pocket bike championships in 2009, in the All Japan Pocket Bike GP2 and GP3 classes, followed by the Pocket Bike Life Cup GP2 class. In 2010, he moved to mini bike racing.

=== Tsukuba Road Race Championship (2011–2013) ===
==== J-GP3, CBR250R Cup and 56Racing ====
In 2011, Nagoe made the jump to full-size motorcycles and entered the final round of the Tsukuba Road Race Championship, racing in the J-GP3 class aboard a Honda RS125R, and finished in ninth place. The following year, he completed his first full-time season in the Championship, racing for SP Tadao Racing Team, alongside his older brother Kousuke. His personal best race result came in the fourth round after finishing in seventh place, and ranked 12th overall in the final standings.

In June 2012, former Grand Prix motorcycle racer Shinya Nakano formed 56Racing rider development project, with Nagoe selected as its first rider. Nakano sponsored Nagoe for the inaugural CBR250R Cup race in the Tsukuba TT, where he finished in ninth place, following a fall during a battle for the lead with his brother.

For the 2013 season, Nagoe entered the new CBR250R Cup in the Tsukuba Road Race Championship with 56Racing, with the objective of qualifying for the Suzuka Grand Championship held at the Suzuka Circuit later in the year. He had a successful run in the Cup where he finished in second place in all but one round, and ranked as runner-up in the final standings. This result granted him a spot in the CBR250R Dream Cup of the Suzuka Grand Championship in December, where he would finish in third place.

=== Asia Dream Cup (2014) ===
In 2014, Nagoe competed in the Asia Dream Cup, a one-make series aimed at young Asian riders, which followed the Asia Road Racing Championship's calendar. Aboard the same race-spec Honda CBR250R he had been competing with at Tsukuba, Nagoe was a consistent podium finisher throughout the season, clinching his maiden win in only the second round at Sentul, in front of championship rival Khairul Idham Pawi. He completed the season in third place overall, with a total of seven podiums and one win across the 12 races.

=== All Japan Road Race Championship (2015–2026) ===
==== ST600: Debut in the All Japan ====
Following his participation in the Asia Dream Cup, Nagoe returned to Japan for 2015 and entered the ST600 class of the All Japan Road Race Championship with Musashi Harc-Pro. In his rookie season, he managed several top-15 finishes, with the opening round at Autopolis being his best result with an 11th place. In the opening round of his second ST600 season, Nagoe clinched his maiden win at Tsukuba, following two red flags and restarts. He managed to break through the top-ten in all the races and claimed a second podium at the final round at Suzuka, which moved him up to third in the final championship standings.

In 2017, Nagoe faced his third and final year in ST600. Still racing under the Musashi Harc-Pro outfit, his best race was at Autopolis where he finished in third place, but could not improve the previous year's record and finished sixth overall.

==== J-GP2: First championship ====
In December 2017, Musashi Harc-Pro announced their 2018 line-up, with Nagoe taking the J-GP2 spot left by reigning champion Ryo Mizuno, who would be stepping up to JSB1000. Nagoe began his rookie season in the prototype class on pole position at Motegi, and while a technical problem forced him to retire from the race, he would clinch his maiden podium in the following round at Sugo, behind Ryosuke Iwato and Taro Sekiguchi. Following another podium at Autopolis, Nagoe took victory for the first time in the final round at Suzuka, and was third in the championship standings to Iwato and Sakumoto.

Nagoe returned to J-GP2 for a second year with Harc-Pro in 2019. Throughout the season, he stepped on the podium on all but one occasion, won a total of three races across Motegi, Tsukuba and Autopolis—and clinched the championship title at the final round at Suzuka, beating rivals Enokido and Sakumoto.

==== Moto2 World Championship ====
In June 2019, Nagoe was called up by the Moto2 team Honda Team Asia to make a replacement appearance at the Italian Grand Prix in place of the injured Somkiat Chantra. During the race, he made up nine positions and was running in 23rd place before crashing out on the fourth lap. Two months later, he was called up again for another injury replacement, and took part in the Austrian and British Grands Prix, where he finished 25th and 28th, respectively.

==== ST1000: Runner-up season ====
Following two years and a championship title in J-GP2, Nagoe moved to the brand new production bike class ST1000 with Harc-Pro in 2020, which succeeded the defunct prototype class. As a rookie and with a shortened calendar, he stepped on the podium in three out of four races. After a retirement in the opening round, his maiden podium came in the Autopolis round, which was followed by victories at Motegi and Suzuka. He finished as championship runner-up, behind Yuki Takahashi.

==== JSB1000: Premier-class years and injuries ====
For 2021, Harc-Pro promoted Nagoe to Japan's top class JSB1000, aboard a superbike-spec Honda CBR1000RR-R—and was given a bike development role focused on the team's participation in the Suzuka 8 Hours. In his rookie season, Nagoe managed to consistently finish in the top-ten spots and clinched his maiden podium in the class at Suzuka. He would later earn two more podiums at Okayama and Autopolis, and finished the season fifth as the top-ranked rookie.

During pre-season testing of 2022 at Suzuka, Nagoe suffered an injury to his right knee and consequently missed the first four races of the calendar. After coming back for the Autopolis and Sugo rounds, he was adviced to undergo another operation on his knee and missed the remainder of the season. Nagoe began his third season in the top class with four consecutive podiums at Motegi and Suzuka. He scored top-ten finishes in all races and closed the year with two four-places at Suzuka. It marked his best career season in the JSB1000.

Following another consistent season in 2024, Nagoe saw his 2025 campaign burdened by injuries. During Sugo's Race 1 he went down at high speed, injuring his shoulder, and was forced to withdraw for the remainder of the weekend. Later in the season during the Autopolis round, he suffered another crash where he injured his cervical spine, which ended his season prematurely—and was replaced by Keito Abe for the final two rounds.

==== Return to ST1000 and retirement ====
After five full seasons in Japan's top class, Harc-Pro announced Nagoe would be stepping down to the ST1000 class for 2026, with Yuki Kunii taking his superbike spot. This change not only affected the range of modifications allowed on the motorcycle, but also the tires as he had been riding Bridgestone since 2021, and had to adapt to ST1000's Dunlops. He clinched his first podium of the season in the second race at Autopolis, which was followed up by another podium at Motegi, in wet conditions.

On 18 September 2026, Nagoe formally announced his retirement from motorcycle racing at the end of the 2026 season.

=== Suzuka 8 Hours ===
Nagoe made a total of eight entries to the Suzuka 8 Hours endurance race throughout his career. In 2023, he stepped on the podium for the first time with a second place—racing for his All Japan team SDG Honda Racing, with Naomichi Uramoto and Haruki Noguchi as teammates. The following year, HRC picked Nagoe as one of their three riders for the race, alongside Takumi Takahashi and Johann Zarco. The trio ended up winning the race in front of YART Yamaha and Yoshimura SERT Motul, which marked the team's third consecutive 8 Hours win.

Nagoe returned to Harc-Pro for his final two participations in the 8 Hours, pairing up Yuki Kunii and Keito Abe. The trio finished just outside of the podium in 2025, and eighth in 2026.

== Career statistics ==
=== Tsukuba Road Race Championship ===
==== Races by year ====
(key) (Races in bold indicate pole position; races in italics indicate fastest lap. Superscript numbers indicate overall results, including both national and international classes.)

Year	Class	Bike	1	2	3	4	5	Pos	Pts
2011	J-GP3 (Note: National class.)	Honda	TSU1	TSU2	TSU3	TSU4; 9^{12}		19th	12
2012	J-GP3	Honda	TSU1; 9^{12}	TSU2; Ret	TSU3; 16^{16}	TSU4; 7^{7}	TSU5	12th	31
2013	CBR250R	Honda	TSU1; 2	TSU2; 2	TSU3; 7	**TSU4**; 2		2nd	80

=== Suzuka Grand Championship ===
Year	Class	Bike	Pos
2013	CBR250R Dream Cup	Honda CBR250R	3rd

=== Asia Road Racing Championship ===
==== Races by year ====
(key) (Races in bold indicate pole position; races in italics indicate fastest lap)

Year	Class	Bike	1		2		3		4		5		6		Pos	Pts
Year	Class	Bike	R1	R2	R1	R2	R1	R2	R1	R2	R1	R2	R1	R2	Pos	Pts
2014	Asia Dream Cup	Honda	SEP; 2	SEP; 2	SEN; 1	SEN; Ret	AUT; 2	AUT; 2	SUZ; 2	SUZ; 6	BUR; 5	BUR; 4	LUS; 3	LUS; Ret	3rd	175
2017	SS600	Honda	JOH; 9	JOH; 8	BUR; 11	BUR; 11	SUZ; 11	SUZ; Ret	SEN; 13	SEN; 16	MAD; 4	MAD; 4	BUR; Ret	BUR; 13	11th	62

=== All Japan Road Race Championship ===
==== Races by year ====
(key) (Races in bold indicate pole position; races in italics indicate fastest lap.)

Year	Class	Bike	1	2	3	4	5	6	7	8	9	10	11	12	13	Pos	Pts
2015	ST600	Honda	AUT; 11	MOT; 26	SUG; 18	TSU; C	OKA; 12	SUZ; 13								15th	33
2016	ST600	Honda	TSU; 1	MOT; 5	AUT; C	SUG; 6	OKA; Ret	SUZ; 3								3rd	79
2017	ST600	Honda	TSU; 8	SUG; Ret	MOT; 8	AUT; 3	OKA; 5	SUZ; 4								6th	83
2018	J-GP2	Harc-Pro	**MOT**; Ret	SUG; 3	TSU1; 5	TSU2; 5	AUT; 2	OKA; 4‡	SUZ; 1							3rd	111
2019	J-GP2	Harc-Pro	**MOT**; 1	SUG; 2	**TSU1**; 2	**TSU2**; 1	OKA; 5	**AUT**; 1	**SUZ**; 2							1st	160
2020	ST1000	Honda	SUG; Ret	OKA; C	AUT; 2	MOT; 1	**SUZ**; 1									2nd	75
2021	JSB1000	Honda	MOT1; Ret	MOT2; 7	SUZ1; Ret	SUZ2; 6	SUG1; 13‡	SUG2; 5	SUZ1; 2	SUZ2; 4	OKA; 3	AUT1; 7	AUT2; 2			5th	115.5
2022	JSB1000	Honda	MOT1	MOT2	SUZ1	SUZ2	AUT1; 5	AUT2; 6	SUG1; Ret	SUG2; 6	AUT	OKA	SUZ1	SUZ2	SUZ3	15th	31
2023	JSB1000	Honda	MOT1; 3	MOT2; 3	SUZ1; 3	SUZ2; 3	SUG1; 6	SUG2; 8	MOT; 5	AUT1; 8	AUT2; 4	OKA; 8	SUZ1; 4	SUZ2; 4		4th	154
2024	JSB1000	Honda	SUZ; 11	MOT1; 7	MOT2; 8	SUG1; 6	SUG2; 8	MOT; 7	AUT1; 6	AUT2; 16	OKA; 8	SUZ1; 9	SUZ2; 7			6th	89
2025	JSB1000	Honda	MOT; 5	SUG1; Ret	SUG2; DNS	MOT1; Ret	MOT2; 6	AUT1; 18†	AUT2; DNS	OKA	SUZ1	SUZ2				19th	21
2026	ST1000	Honda	SUG; 5	AUT; 3	MOT1; 3	MOT2; 6	OKA; 9	SUZ; 4								4th	76

- † – Rider did not finish the race, but was classified as he completed more than 75% of the race distance.
- ‡ – Half points were awarded based on the qualifying results.

=== Suzuka 8 Hours ===
Year	Class	Team	Co-riders	Bike	Pos
2017	EWC	(Japan) Mistresa with ATJ Racing	(Japan) Takahiro Nakatsuhara (Japan) Taro Sekiguchi	Honda CBR1000RR	16th
2018	EWC	(Japan) Mistresa with ATJ Racing	(Japan) Takahiro Nakatsuhara (Japan) Taro Sekiguchi	Honda CBR1000RR SP2	16th
2019	EWC	(Japan) Honda Asia Dream Racing	(Malaysia) Zaqhwan Zaidi (Indonesia) Andi Izdihar	Honda CBR1000RR SP2	11th
2022	EWC	(Japan) SDG Honda Racing	(Japan) Naomichi Uramoto (Japan) Ikuhiro Enokido	Honda CBR1000RR-R	NC
2023	EWC	(Japan) SDG Honda Racing	(Japan) Naomichi Uramoto (Japan) Haruki Noguchi	Honda CBR1000RR-R Fireblade	2nd
2024	EWC	Team HRC with Japan Post	(Japan) Takumi Takahashi (France) Johann Zarco	Honda CBR1000RR-R SP	1st
2025	EWC	(Japan) SDG Harc-Pro Honda	(Japan) Yuki Kunii (Japan) Keito Abe	Honda CBR1000RR-R	4th
2026	EWC	(Japan) SDG Harc-Pro Honda	(Japan) Yuki Kunii (Japan) Keito Abe	Honda CBR1000RR-R	8th

=== Grand Prix motorcycle racing ===
==== By season ====
Season	Class	Motorcycle	Team	Race	Win	Podium	Pole	FLap	Pts	Plcd
2019	Moto3	Kalex	Idemitsu Honda Team Asia	3	0	0	0	0	0	39th
Total				**3**	**0**	**0**	**0**	**0**	**0**	

==== By class ====
Class	Seasons	1st GP	1st pod	1st win	Race	Win	Podiums	Pole	FLap	Pts	WChmp
Moto2	2019	2019 Italy			3	0	0	0	0	0	0
Total	2019				**3**	**0**	**0**	**0**	**0**	**0**	**0**

==== Races by year ====
(key) (Races in bold indicate pole position; races in italics indicate fastest lap)

Year	Class	Bike	1	2	3	4	5	6	7	8	9	10	11	12	13	14	15	16	17	18	19	Pos	Pts
2019	Moto2	Kalex	QAT	ARG	AME	SPA	FRA	ITA; Ret	CAT	NED	GER	CZE	AUT; 25	GBR; 28	RSM	ARA	THA	JPN	AUS	MAL	VAL	39th	0
