= 2024 FIM JuniorGP World Championship =

Junior Motorcycle World Championship

2024 FIM JuniorGP World Championship
Previous:	2023	Next:	2025
Support series: FIM Moto2 European Championship; Stock European Championship; European Talent Cup

The 2024 FIM JuniorGP World Championship was the third season after leaving the historical connection to CEV. The season started on 21 April at Misano World Circuit Marco Simoncelli in Italy and finished on 27 November at Circuito do Estoril in Portugal.

== Calendar ==
The provisional calendar was published in November 2023.

round	Date	Circuit	Pole position	Fastest lap	Race winner	Winning constructor	ref
1	21 April	(Italy) Misano	(Spain) Jesús Rios	(Uruguay) Facundo Llambias	(Spain) Jesús Rios	(Austria) KTM	
1	21 April	(Italy) Misano	(Spain) Jesús Rios	(Spain) Jesús Rios	(Spain) Jesús Rios	(Austria) KTM	
2	5 May	(Portugal) Estoril	(New Zealand) Cormac Buchanan	(Republic of Ireland) Casey O'Gorman	(Finland) Rico Salmela	(Sweden) Husqvarna	
3	19 May	(Spain) Barcelona	(Spain) Adrián Cruces	(Italy) Dodo Boggio	(Spain) Jesús Rios	(Austria) KTM	
3	19 May	(Spain) Barcelona	(Spain) Adrián Cruces	(Austria) Jakob Rosenthaler	(Spain) Álvaro Carpe	(Sweden) Husqvarna	
4	23 June	(Portugal) Portimão	(Italy) Guido Pini	(Italy) Guido Pini	(Spain) Álvaro Carpe	(Sweden) Husqvarna	
4	23 June	(Portugal) Portimão	(Italy) Guido Pini	(Spain) Jesús Rios	(Italy) Guido Pini	(Austria) KTM	
5	15 September	(Spain) Jerez	(Italy) Guido Pini	(Spain) Brian Uriarte	(Italy) Guido Pini	(Austria) KTM	
5	15 September	(Spain) Jerez	(Italy) Guido Pini	(Spain) Brian Uriarte	(Spain) Brian Uriarte	(Austria) KTM	
6	13 October	(Spain) Aragón	(Spain) Brian Uriarte	(Austria) Jakob Rosenthaler	(Spain) Álvaro Carpe	(Sweden) Husqvarna	
7	27 November	(Portugal) Estoril	(Spain) Álvaro Carpe	(Uruguay) Facundo Llambias	(Italy) Guido Pini	(Austria) KTM	
7	27 November	(Portugal) Estoril	(Spain) Álvaro Carpe	(Spain) Máximo Quiles	(Spain) Máximo Quiles	(Japan) Honda	

== Entry list ==
Team	Constructor	No.	Rider	Rounds
(Spain) CFMoto Aspar Junior Team	CFMoto	19	(Italy) Alessandro Morosi	All
(Spain) CFMoto Aspar Junior Team	CFMoto	71	(Qatar) Hamad Al Sahouti	1–2
(Spain) CFMoto Aspar Junior Team	CFMoto	89	(Spain) Marcos Uriarte	All
(Japan) Asia Talent Team	Honda	32	(Japan) Zen Mitani	1
(Japan) Asia Talent Team	Honda	56	(Japan) Amon Odaki	All
(Japan) Asia Talent Team	Honda	57	(Malaysia) Danial Shahril	All
(Indonesia) Astra Honda Racing Team	Honda	93	(Indonesia) Fadillah Arbi Aditama	3–7
(United Kingdom) British Talent Team-MLAV Racing	Honda	8	(United Kingdom) Eddie O'Shea	1–5
(United Kingdom) British Talent Team-MLAV Racing	Honda	52	(United Kingdom) Evan Belford	All
(United Kingdom) British Talent Team-MLAV Racing	Honda	92	(United Kingdom) Lucas Brown	6–7
Honda Racing Thailand	Honda	20	(Thailand) Jakkreephat Phuettisan	All
Honda Racing Thailand	Honda	85	(Thailand) Kiattisak Singhapong	2
(Spain) Team Estrella Galicia 0,0	Honda	24	(France) Guillem Planques	1–2
(Spain) Team Estrella Galicia 0,0	Honda	28	(Spain) Máximo Quiles	All
(Spain) Team Estrella Galicia 0,0	Honda	67	(Republic of Ireland) Casey O'Gorman	All
(Spain) Team Estrella Galicia 0,0	Honda	94	(Uruguay) Facundo Llambias	All
(Germany) Liqui Moly Husqvarna Intact Junior GP Team	Husqvarna	5	(Austria) Leo Rammerstorfer	All
(Germany) Liqui Moly Husqvarna Intact Junior GP Team	Husqvarna	27	(Finland) Rico Salmela	All
(Germany) Liqui Moly Husqvarna Intact Junior GP Team	Husqvarna	78	(Austria) Jakob Rosenthaler	All
(Spain) STV Laglisse Racing	Husqvarna	4	(Poland) Milan Pawelec	1, 3–7
(Spain) STV Laglisse Racing	Husqvarna	83	(Spain) Álvaro Carpe	All
(Italy) AC Racing Team	KTM	29	(Hungary) Kevin Farkas	All
(Italy) AC Racing Team	KTM	72	(Italy) Edoardo Liguori	All
(Spain) AGR Team	KTM	14	(New Zealand) Cormac Buchanan	All
(Spain) AGR Team	KTM	17	(India) Geoffrey Emmanuel	1–4
(Spain) AGR Team	KTM	22	(Netherlands) Owen van Trigt	5–7
(Spain) AGR Team	KTM	45	(South Africa) Kgopotso Mononyane	All
(Italy) Eagle-1	KTM	18	(Italy) Edoardo Bertola	6
(Italy) Eagle-1	KTM	34	(Italy) Cesare Tiezzi	All
(Italy) Eagle-1	KTM	47	(Italy) Dodo Boggio	1–5, 7
(Spain) Finetwork Team	KTM	11	(Spain) Adrián Cruces	All
(Spain) Finetwork Team	KTM	21	(South Africa) Ruché Moodley	1–5
(Spain) Finetwork Team	KTM	95	(Italy) Leo Zanni	6–7
(Germany) F. Koch Rennsport	KTM	2	(Germany) Loris Schönrock	All
(Spain) MRE Talent	KTM	54	(Spain) Jesús Rios	All
(Italy) MTA Junior Team	KTM	25	(Italy) Leonardo Abruzzo	All
(Italy) MTA Junior Team	KTM	41	(Japan) Aoi Uezu	All
(Italy) MTA Junior Team	KTM	48	(Switzerland) Lenoxx Phommara	All
(Italy) MTA Junior Team	KTM	91	(Japan) Kotaro Uchiumi	All
(Spain) Seventytwo Motorsports Artbox	KTM	36	(Australia) Angus Grenfell	1–6
(Spain) Seventytwo Motorsports Artbox	KTM	51	(Spain) Brian Uriarte	5–7
(Spain) Seventytwo Motorsports Artbox	KTM	69	(Spain) Marcos Ruda	1–3
(Spain) Seventytwo Motorsports Artbox	KTM	96	(Italy) Guido Pini	4–7
(Malaysia) SIC Racing-MSI	KTM	13	(Malaysia) Hakim Danish	1–6
(Malaysia) SIC Racing-MSI	KTM	37	(Malaysia) Farish Hafiy	7
Entry lists:

== Championship standings ==
Scoring system

Points were awarded to the top fifteen finishers. Rider had to finish the race to earn points.

Position	1st	2nd	3rd	4th	5th	6th	7th	8th	9th	10th	11th	12th	13th	14th	15th
Points	25	20	16	13	11	10	9	8	7	6	5	4	3	2	1

=== Riders championship ===
Pos.	Rider	Bike	MIS (Italy)		EST1 (Portugal)	CAT (Spain)		POR (Portugal)		JER (Spain)		ARA (Spain)	EST2 (Portugal)		Points
1	(Spain) Álvaro Carpe	Husqvarna	6	Ret	9	9	1	1	3	3	3	1	Ret^{P}	6^{P}	157
2	(Italy) Guido Pini	KTM						2^{PF}	1^{P}	1^{P}	4^{P}	4	1	2	141
3	(Spain) Máximo Quiles	Honda	Ret	9	6	15	4	4	2	Ret	2	2	Ret	1^{F}	129
4	(Spain) Jesús Rios	KTM	1^{P}	1^{PF}	26	1	Ret	25	4^{F}	Ret	5	11	7	12	117
5	(Spain) Marcos Uriarte	CFMoto	3	6	2	2	3	27	10	14	13	18	3	9	116
6	(New Zealand) Cormac Buchanan	KTM	Ret	3	3^{P}	5	5	5	Ret	9	10	6	2	7	116
7	(Spain) Adrián Cruces	KTM	11	2	7	3^{P}	6^{P}	6	9	4	9	17	Ret	4	116
8	(Italy) Alessandro Morosi	CFMoto	2	7	4	7	2	11	Ret	11	12	9	10	19	98
9	(Austria) Jakob Rosenthaler	Husqvarna	10	Ret	10	4	Ret^{F}	17	8	28	6	7^{F}	5	3	79
10	(Spain) Brian Uriarte	KTM								2^{F}	1^{F}	5^{P}	4	8	78
11	(Republic of Ireland) Casey O'Gorman	Honda	4	5	Ret^{F}	Ret	15	3	6	7	Ret	3	Ret	Ret	76
12	(Uruguay) Facundo Llambias	Honda	7^{F}	Ret	29	6	Ret	8	7	13	8	Ret	8^{F}	5	66
13	(Finland) Rico Salmela	Husqvarna	16	Ret	1	16	Ret	Ret	5	5	Ret	8	Ret	10	61
14	(United Kingdom) Eddie O'Shea	Honda	8	4	8	12	Ret	Ret	DNS	6	7				52
15	(Malaysia) Hakim Danish	KTM	9	15	15	11	7	9	11	8	Ret	13			46
16	(South Africa) Ruché Moodley	KTM	Ret	Ret	13	10	9	7	13	10	11				39
17	(Austria) Leo Rammerstorfer	Husqvarna	12	20	11	13	8	26	14	12	Ret	16	9	14	35
18	(Malaysia) Danial Shahril	Honda	Ret	10	5	18	13	Ret	17	20	16	10	16	18	26
19	(Italy) Dodo Boggio	KTM	14	11	25	8^{F}	Ret	18	29	Ret	Ret		6	Ret	25
20	(Poland) Milan Pawelec	Husqvarna	13	13		19	12	16	21	15	15	Ret	11	Ret	17
21	(United Kingdom) Evan Belford	Honda	DNQ	DNQ	27	21	10	10	Ret	18	22	Ret	18	13	15
22	(Spain) Marcos Ruda	KTM	Ret	8	12	14	Ret								14
23	(Japan) Amon Odaki	Honda	Ret	14	DNQ	23	14	13	24	21	23	14	25	11	14
24	(France) Guillem Planques	Honda	11	12	14										11
25	(Indonesia) Fadillah Arbi Aditama	Honda				Ret	28	19	12	Ret	25	12	14	17	8
26	(Switzerland) Lenoxx Phommara	KTM	15	Ret	21	22	18	20	16	17	14	19	12	16	7
27	(Italy) Leonardo Abruzzo	KTM	18	17	18	26	11	WD	WD	24	20	21	15	Ret	6
28	(South Africa) Kgopotso Mononyane	KTM	Ret	19	19	20	16	12	15	16	17	25	WD	WD	5
29	(Italy) Edoardo Liguori	KTM	19	16	17	31	20	Ret	23	19	Ret	22	13	15	4
30	(Australia) Angus Grenfell	KTM	Ret	21	16	25	19	14	19	DNQ	DNQ	24			2
31	(Japan) Kotaro Uchiumi	KTM	21	23	30	17	Ret	15	18	25	Ret	20	23	21	1
32	(Netherlands) Owen van Trigt	KTM								27	21	15	17	25	1
33	(Thailand) Jakkreephat Phuettisan	Honda	16	Ret	22	24	17	22	20	23	18	29	21	23	0
34	(Japan) Zen Mitani	Honda	17	18											0
35	(Italy) Cesare Tiezzi	KTM	20	22	NC	29	21	21	28	22	19	23	19	22	0
36	(Hungary) Kevin Farkas	KTM	DNQ	DNQ	23	27	22	23	22	26	24	DNQ	20	20	0
37	(Thailand) Kiattisak Singhapong	Honda			20										0
38	(Qatar) Hamad Al Sahouti	CFMoto	22	25	DNQ										0
39	(United Kingdom) Lucas Brown	Honda										26	22	26	0
40	(Japan) Aoi Uezu	KTM	23	24	24	30	23	Ret	25	DNQ	DNQ	27	26	27	0
41	(Malaysia) Farish Hafiy	KTM											24	24	0
42	(India) Geoffrey Emmanuel	KTM	DNQ	DNQ	28	DNQ	DNQ	24	26						0
43	(Germany) Loris Schönrock	KTM	DNQ	DNQ	DNQ	DNQ	DNQ	DNQ	27	DNQ	DNQ	DNQ	27	Ret	0
44	(Italy) Edoardo Bertola	KTM										28			0
	(Italy) Leo Zanni	KTM										WD	WD	WD	0
Pos.	Rider	Bike	MIS (Italy)		EST1 (Portugal)	CAT (Spain)		POR (Portugal)		JER (Spain)		ARA (Spain)	EST2 (Portugal)		Points

=== Constructors Championship ===
Pos.	Constructor	MIS (Italy)		EST1 (Portugal)	BAR (Spain)		ALG (Portugal)		JER (Spain)		ARA (Spain)	EST2 (Portugal)		Points
1	(Austria) KTM	1	1	3	1	5	2	1	1	1	4	1	2	255
2	(Sweden) Husqvarna	6	13	1	4	1	1	3	3	3	1	5	3	201
3	(Japan) Honda	4	4	5	6	4	3	2	6	2	2	8	1	179
4	(China) CFMoto	2	6	2	2	2	11	10	11	12	9	3	9	140
Pos.	Constructor	MIS (Italy)		EST1 (Portugal)	BAR (Spain)		ALG (Portugal)		JER (Spain)		ARA (Spain)	EST2 (Portugal)		Points
