= 2022 Asia Talent Cup =

Motorcycle racing series

2022 Asia Talent Cup
Previous:	2021	Next:	2023

The 2022 Honda Idemitsu Talent Cup is the eighth season of the Asia Talent Cup. Malaysian rider Hakim Danish won the championship, following Japanese rider Shinya Ezawa in second and Indonesian rider Veda Ega Pratama in third.

== Entry list ==
2022 entry list
No	Rider
2	(Japan) Rei Wakamatsu
3	(Indonesia) Aan Riswanto
5	(Japan) Gun Mie
6	(Australia) Carter Thompson
7	(Indonesia) Veda Ega Pratama
8	(Malaysia) Farres Putra
9	(Thailand) Thanakorn Lakharn
10	(India) Kavin Quintal
11	(Thailand) Thanat Laoongplio
12	(Australia) Marianos Nikolis
13	(Malaysia) Hakim Danish
14	(Japan) Amon Odaki
15	(Indonesia) Reykat Yusuf Fadilah
16	(Vietnam) Nguyen Tran Duc Tai
17	(Malaysia) Emil Izdhar
18	(Australia) Cameron Swain
19	(Malaysia) Farish Hafiy
20	(Thailand) Jakkreephat Phuettisan
21	(Japan) Shinya Ezawa
22	(Indonesia) Diandra Trihardika
23	(Qatar) Hamad al-Sahouti

== Calendar ==
The following Grand prix were the scheduled Grand prix for the 2022 Asia Talent Cup.

2022 calendar
Round	Round	Coinciding Event	Date	Circuit
1	Grand Prix of Qatar	2022 MotoGP World Championship	4–6 March	Losail International Circuit, Lusail
2	Pertamina Grand Prix of Indonesia	2022 MotoGP World Championship	18–20 March	Mandalika International Street Circuit, Central Lombok
3	MOTUL Grand Prix of Japan	2022 MotoGP World Championship	23–25 September	Mobility Resort Motegi, Motegi
4	OR Grand Prix of Thailand	2022 MotoGP World Championship	30 September–2 October	Chang International Circuit, Buriram
5	Petronas Grand Prix of Malaysia	2022 MotoGP World Championship	21–23 October	Sepang International Circuit, Sepang
6	(Indonesia) Pirelli Indonesian Round	2022 Superbike World Championship	11–13 November	Mandalika International Street Circuit, Central Lombok

== Results ==
The following results are the official race results of the 2022 Asia Talent Cup:

2022 Grand Prix results
Round	Round	Date	Circuit	Pole position	Race winner
1	Qatar Round	5 March	Losail International Circuit	(Japan) Amon Odaki	(Japan) Shinya Ezawa
1	Qatar Round	6 March	Losail International Circuit	(Japan) Amon Odaki	(Japan) Amon Odaki
2	Indonesia Round	19 March	Mandalika International Street Circuit	(Japan) Amon Odaki	(Malaysia) Hakim Danish
2	Indonesia Round	20 March	Mandalika International Street Circuit	(Japan) Amon Odaki	(Malaysia) Hakim Danish
3	Japan Round	24 September	Mobility Resort Motegi	(Japan) Gun Mie	(Japan) Shinya Ezawa
3	Japan Round	25 September	Mobility Resort Motegi	(Japan) Gun Mie	Race Cancelled
4	Thailand Round	1 October	Chang International Circuit	(Australia) Carter Thompson	(Malaysia) Hakim Danish
4	Thailand Round	2 October	Chang International Circuit	(Australia) Carter Thompson	(Indonesia) Veda Ega Pratama
5	(Malaysia) Malaysian Round	22 October	Sepang International Circuit	(Australia) Carter Thompson	(Australia) Carter Thompson
5	(Malaysia) Malaysian Round	23 October	Sepang International Circuit	(Australia) Carter Thompson	(Malaysia) Hakim Danish
6	(Indonesia) WSBK Indonesian Round	12 November	Mandalika International Street Circuit	(Indonesia) Veda Ega Pratama	(Indonesia) Veda Ega Pratama
6	(Indonesia) WSBK Indonesian Round	13 November	Mandalika International Street Circuit	(Indonesia) Veda Ega Pratama	(Indonesia) Veda Ega Pratama

== Riders' Championship standings ==
Scoring System

Points are awarded to the top fifteen finishers. A rider has to finish the race to earn points.

Position	1st	2nd	3rd	4th	5th	6th	7th	8th	9th	10th	11th	12th	13th	14th	15th
Points	25	20	16	13	11	10	9	8	7	6	5	4	3	2	1

Pos.	Rider	QAT1 (Qatar)	QAT2 (Qatar)	IND1 (Indonesia)	IND2 (Indonesia)	JPN1 (Japan)	JPN2 (Japan)	THA1 (Thailand)	THA2 (Thailand)	MAL1 (Malaysia)	MAL2 (Malaysia)	SBK1 (Indonesia)	SBK2 (Indonesia)	Pts
1	(Malaysia) Hakim Danish	5	5	1	1	2	C	1	7	Ret	1	3	2	187
2	(Japan) Shinya Ezawa	1	6	2	3	1	C	6	4	4	3	4	3	177
3	(Indonesia) Veda Ega Pratama	Ret	3			6	C	2	1	Ret	2	1	1	141
4	(Japan) Gun Mie	2	4	DNS	2	Ret	C	3	2	3	5	5	8	135
5	(Australia) Carter Thompson	Ret	7	Ret	6	Ret	C	4	3	1	Ret	2	7	102
6	(Qatar) Hamad al-Sahouti	4	2	4	8	3	C	13	Ret	8	6			91
7	(Japan) Amon Odaki	3	1	Ret	4	7	C	17	13	5	Ret	8	12	89
8	(Indonesia) Reykat Yusuf Fadilah	8	14	3	7	13	C	9	8	9	8	11	4	86
9	(Japan) Rei Wakamatsu	Ret	9	5	6	4	C	Ret		2	4	9	13	85
10	(Thailand) Jakkreephat Phuettisan	7	8	Ret	10	5	C	8	5	14	10	7	9	77
11	(Australia) Marianos Nikolis	Ret	10	7	14	8	C	5	14	6	Ret	10	10	60
12	(Indonesia) Aan Riswanto	Ret	13	8	12	17	C	11	6	12	11	6	6	59
13	(Malaysia) Farish Hafiy	6	Ret	9	13	11	C	12	Ret	7	13	13	5	55
14	(Indonesia) Diandra Trihardika	10	11	Ret	9	12	C	21	10	10	12	12	Ret	42
15	(Malaysia) Farres Putra	9	12	Ret	Ret	10	C	7	11	11	Ret	Ret		36
16	(Thailand) Thanakorn Lakharn	Ret	NC			9	C	10	9	16	7	15	15	31
17	(Thailand) Thanat Laoongplio	Ret	Ret	6	11			15	12	13	Ret	14	11	30
18	(Malaysia) Emil Idzhar	Ret	15	10	15	15	C	19	15	15	9	17	16	18
19	(Australia) Cameron Swain	11	16	10	16	14	C	16	17	17	Ret	Ret	14	14
20	(India) Kavin Quintal	Ret	17	13	17	16	C	20	18	18	14	18	18	5
21	(Indonesia) Zachry Akbar			12	18									4
22	(Vietnam) Nguyen Tran Duc Tai	12	18	Ret	Ret			Ret	19					4
23	(Thailand) Burapa Wanmoon							14	Ret					2
24	(Indonesia) Decksa Almer Alfarezel											16	17	0
25	(Thailand) Vatican Sukkum							18	16					0
Pos.	Rider	QAT1 (Qatar)	QAT2 (Qatar)	IND1 (Indonesia)	IND2 (Indonesia)	JPN1 (Japan)	JPN2 (Japan)	THA1 (Thailand)	THA2 (Thailand)	MAL1 (Malaysia)	MAL2 (Malaysia)	SBK1 (Indonesia)	SBK2 (Indonesia)	Pts
