= Autoliv =

Swedish automotive safety supplier

Autoliv AB
- Type: Public company
- Traded as: NYSE: ALV; Nasdaq Stockholm: ALIV SDB; S&P 400 component
- ISIN: US0528001094; SE0000382335
- Industry: Automotive safety
- Founded: 1953; 73 years ago
- Headquarters: Klarabergsviadukten 70, Stockholm, Sweden
- Area served: Worldwide
- Key people: Jan Carlson (Chairman), Mikael Bratt (President and CEO)
- Products: Seatbelts, Airbags, Steering Wheels, Pedestrian Protection Systems, Mobility Safety Solutions
- Revenue: ▲US$10.8 billion (2025)
- Operating income: ▲US$1.09 billion (2025)
- Net income: ▲US$735 million (2025)
- Number of employees: 68,000 (worldwide)
- Parent: Autoliv, Inc.
- Website: www.autoliv.com

Autoliv AB is a Swedish automotive safety supplier founded in Vårgårda in 1953, and headquartered in Stockholm, Sweden, It is the world’s largest automotive safety system supplier, producing systems such as airbags, seatbelts, and steering wheels for automotive manufacturers.

Autoliv has approximately 64,000 employees in 25 countries and conducts research and development through 13 technical centers with 20 test tracks.

The group is among the largest Tier 1 automotive suppliers in the world, with annual revenues exceeding US$8 billion, and is part of the Fortune 500, ranking #289 in 2018.

Legal incorporation is held under Delaware-registered parent Autoliv, Inc. to facilitate the group's dual listings: the company's shares are listed on the New York Stock Exchange and its Swedish Depository Receipts on the Nasdaq Stockholm.

== History ==
Autoliv was founded in Vårgårda, Sweden in the form of Auto Service AB in 1953 by Lennart Lindblad. Autoliv's name combines auto for automobiles, and "liv" {‘li:v} the Swedish word for "life". In 1956, the company became a pioneer in seat belt technology when it began production of two-point seat belts. The name of the company was changed to Autoliv AB in 1968. It was bought in 1974 by Granges Weda AB, inventors of the retractable seat belt. Granges Weda was acquired in turn in 1989 by Electrolux and changed its name to Electrolux Autoliv AB. During the 1980s and 1990s, the company grew through acquisitions, mainly in Europe. Between 1994 and 1997 the company was listed on the Stockholm Stock Exchange under the name of Autoliv AB and in 1997 it merged with the American firm Morton ASP Inc to form Autoliv Inc. In June 2018, the company spun off its Electronics business into a separate company Veoneer Inc.

In March 2019 Autoliv was fined €121 million by the European Commission for participating in two cartels that violated EU antitrust rules. The company, along with TRW and Takata, coordinated the supply of seatbelts, airbags, and steering wheels to Volkswagen Group and BMW Group from 2007 to 2011. Autoliv received a 30% reduction in its fine under the Leniency Notice and an additional 10% reduction for acknowledging its involvement. This case was part of a broader investigation into anti-competitive practices in the automotive parts sector, which resulted in total fines of €2.15 billion.

In November 2019, Autoliv selected Fredrik Westin as Chief Financial Officer and Executive Vice President, succeeding Interim CFO Christian Hanke.

== Products ==
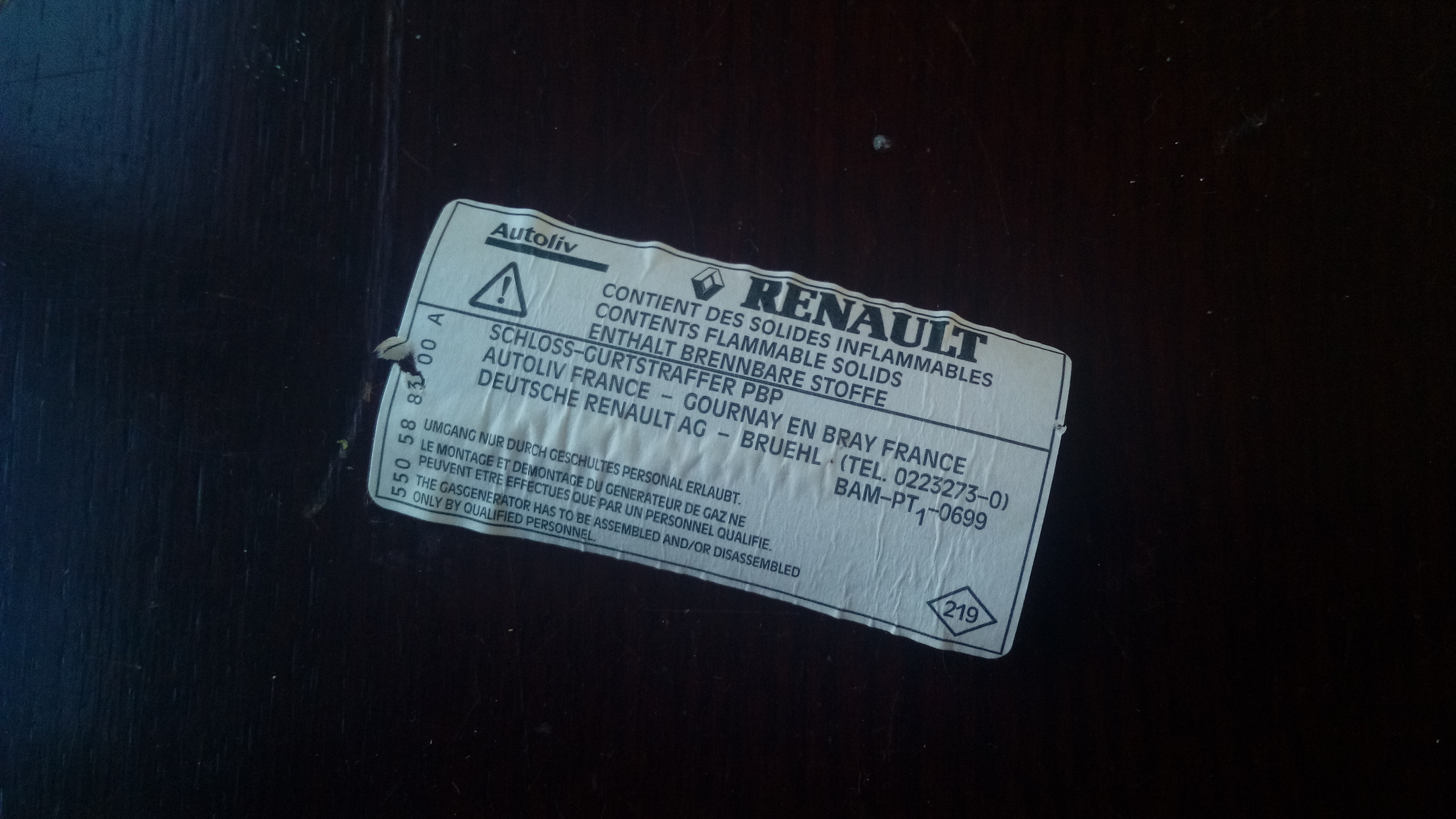
Label from a Renault seatbelt pretensioner unit manufactured by Autoliv

The company develops, manufactures and markets safety systems (estimated market share of approximately 42% in 2020) such as airbags, seatbelts, steering wheels, and passive safety electronics. It also produces pedestrian protection systems.

== See also ==
- List of Swedish companies
- Veoneer
