= Keihin Corporation =

Japanese automotive and motorcycle parts brand

Keihin

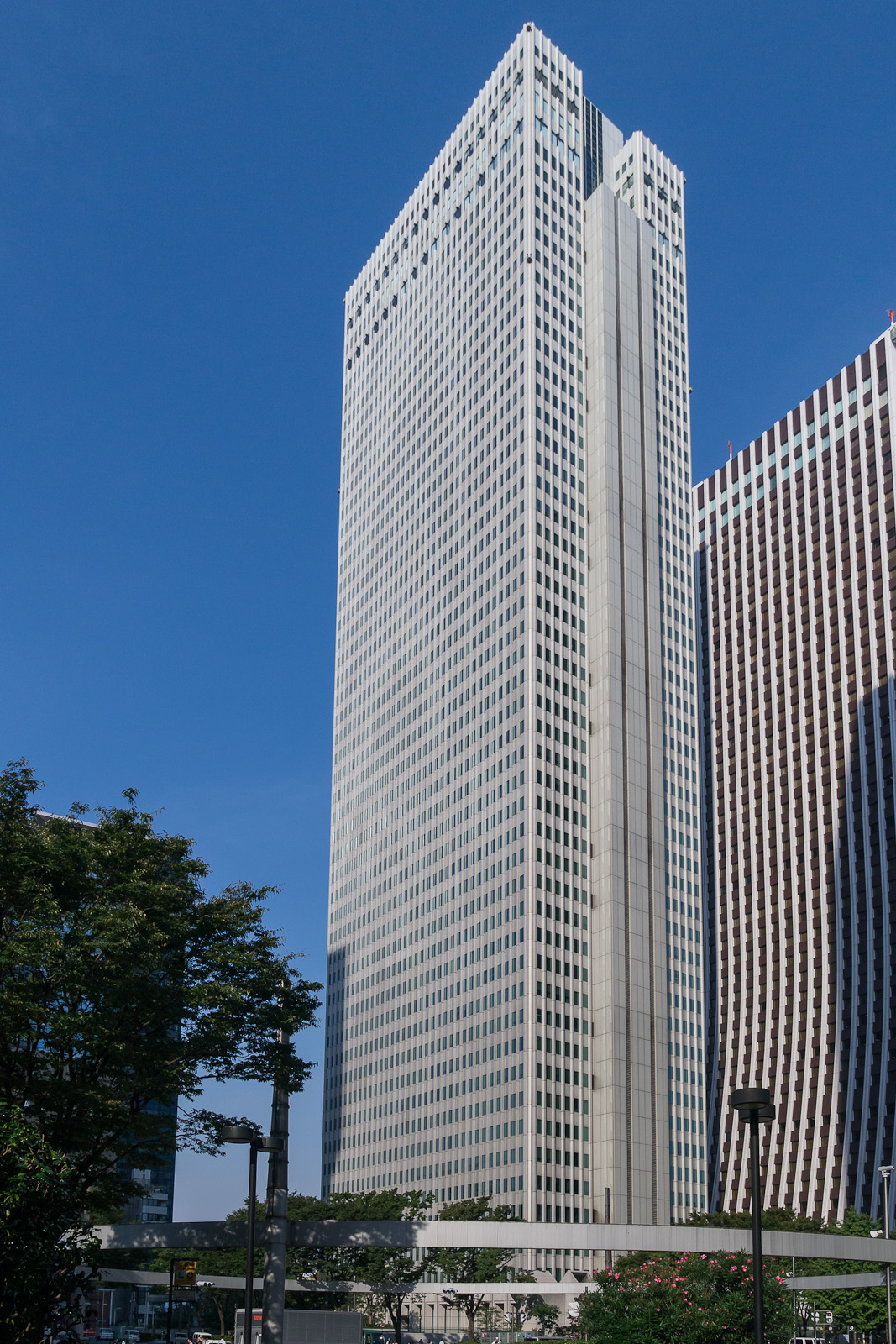
- Keihin's headquarters
- Type: Brand
- Industry: Automotive
- Founded: December 19, 1956; 69 years ago
- Headquarters: Shinjuku Nomura Building, Shinjuku, Tokyo, Japan
- Area served: Worldwide
- Key people: Chitoshi Yokota (President)
- Products: Fuel injection systems; Carburetors; Fuel supply systems; Air-conditioning systems; Fuel cell vehicle products; Hybrid vehicle products
- Revenue: ▲JPY 351 billion (FY 2017) (US$ 3.1 billion) (FY 2017)
- Net income: ▲JPY 17.8 billion (FY 2017) (US$ 160 million) (FY 2017)
- Number of employees: 22,310 (consolidated, as of March 31, 2017)
- Parent: Astemo

Keihin is a Japanese automotive and motorcycle parts brand of Astemo. In the past Keihin was a major supplier to Honda, who owned nearly half of Keihin's shares, but the company also supplies other motorcycle manufacturers, among them Triumph, Suzuki, Kawasaki, KTM, Royal Enfield, and Harley-Davidson. In addition to carburetors, Keihin supplies the automotive industry with engine, transmission, and climate control products, including intake manifold assemblies, HVAC assemblies, compressors, valves, solenoids, and engine control units.

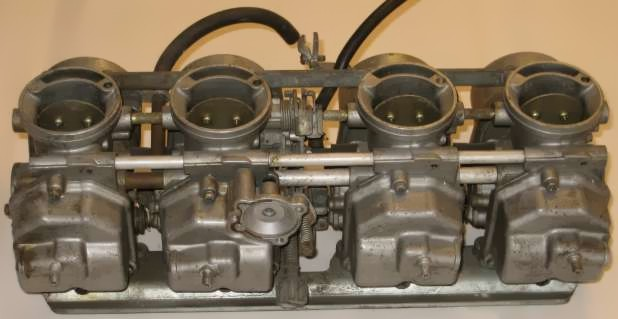
Keihin carburetor assembly for a Honda CB750

== History ==
Keihin was founded in 1956 and began manufacturing in the U.S. in 1989. Counting all U.S. locations, Keihin has more than 20,000 employees. Keihin North America's corporate headquarters is in Anderson, Indiana.
