= Astemo =

Global auto parts supplier

Astemo, Ltd.
- Native name: Astemo株式会社
- Romanized name: Astemo Kabushiki gaisha
- Formerly: Hitachi Astemo, Ltd. (2021–2025)
- Type: Public (K.K)
- Industry: Automotive parts
- Predecessors: Hitachi Automotive Systems; Keihin Corporation; Showa Corporation; Nissin Kogyo
- Founded: January 1, 2021; 5 years ago
- Headquarters: TOFROM YAESU TOWER 28F, 1-6-1 Yaesu 103-0028 Chuo-ku. Tokyo Japan
- Key people: Katsushi Inoue (井上 勝史) (President & CEO)
- Revenue: ▲¥2.19 trillion (2024)
- Operating income: ▲¥67.4 billion (2024)
- Owners: Honda Motor Co., Ltd. (61%); JIC Capital (20%); Hitachi, Ltd. (19%)
- Number of employees: c. 80,000 (2024)
- Website: www.astemo.com

Astemo, Ltd. is a global automotive components manufacturer headquartered in Yaesu, Chuo-ku, Tokyo, Japan.

The company name was changed from Hitachi Astemo, Ltd. to Astemo, Ltd. on April 1, 2025.

== Overview ==
Astemo was established in January 2021 as a global automotive components manufacturer through the business merger of Hitachi Automotive Systems, Keihin Corporation, Showa Corporation, and Nissin Kogyo.

The name "Astemo" stands for "Advanced Sustainable Technologies for Mobility", reflecting the company's focus on technologies related to connected, autonomous, shared and electric mobility. Astemo develops automotive technologies aligned with the industry trends of connectivity, autonomous systems and electrification, with a focus on both passenger and motorcycle applications.

Astemo's ownership structure includes major stakes from both Hitachi, Ltd. and Honda Motor Co., Ltd., each holding 40%, with JIC Capital holding the remaining 20%. While Astemo includes former Honda-affiliated parts manufacturers, it also maintains business relationships with Nissan Motor Co., reflecting Hitachi's historical ties to the Nissan Group.

In December 2025, Honda announced it would acquire an additional 21% of Astemo shares from Hitachi. As a result, the shareholding structure of Astemo will change to 61% for Honda, 20% for JIC, and 19% for Hitachi.

== Strategic direction and market position ==
Astemo has expanded its research and development activities in electric powertrains, advanced driver-assistance systems, and in-vehicle software. These efforts support its strategic focus on electrification and autonomous mobility. The company has also pursued partnerships and vertical integration to address industry competition and supply chain challenges.

In December 2024, the Government of Cantabria awarded the Hitachi Astemo Buelna plant a €1 million grant through SODERCAN’s competitive programme for major industrial competitiveness projects. The funding supports a €5 million experimental development project focused on advanced braking systems, to be completed over 18 months. This initiative underlines the region’s strategic support for automotive innovation and sustainability efforts.

== Technology and innovation ==
Astemo develops components for electric and autonomous vehicles, with a focus on integration of key systems such as power control units, motors, inverters, and software-defined vehicle platforms. The company also emphasizes model-based systems engineering and virtual validation to shorten development timelines and reduce prototyping costs. In 2023, Astemo announced a ¥15.3 billion (~US $100 million) expansion of its Berea, Kentucky plant to support its electrification business.

In July 2025, Astemo announced a £100 million investment in its Horwich manufacturing facility in Bolton, Greater Manchester. The project will establish a new production line dedicated to electric vehicle (EV) inverters, making the site the only facility in the United Kingdom with this production capability.

== Products and technologies ==
- Advanced Driver Assistance Systems (ADAS) and autonomous driving
- Connected and in-vehicle software platforms
- Electrified Powertrain Systems
- Chassis, braking and steering systems
- Steer-by-wire driving

== Milestone ==
Year	Event
1930	Hitachi Ltd. begins production of automotive electric parts in Japan.
1937	Tokyo Kiki Kogyo, Ltd. is spun off from Tokyo Gas Electric Industry, Ltd.
1938	Tokyo Kiki Kogyo, Ltd. becomes a subsidiary of Hitachi, Ltd.
1956	Nissan Motor Co., Ltd. Atsugi Plant is spun off to form Atsugi Automotive Parts.
1965	Tokyo Kiki Kogyo Ltd. changes its name to TOKICO, Ltd.
1989	Atsugi Automotive Parts changes its company name to Atsugi Unisia.
1993	Atsugi Unisia merges with Nihon Denshi Kiki Co., Ltd. to form Unisia Jecs Corporation.
1999	Acquired 16.7% of the stock of Unisia Jecs Corporation to strengthen collaborative development.
2002	Unisia Jecs Corporation becomes a wholly owned subsidiary and changes its name to Hitachi Unisia Automotive, Ltd.
2003	The Automotive Products Division is renamed Automotive Systems. Established Hitachi Automotive Systems Europe GmbH in Germany. Established Hitachi Highly Automotive Products (Shanghai), Ltd. in China.
2004	TOKICO and Hitachi Unisia Automotive merge with Hitachi Ltd. Commenced operations of Guangzhou Hitachi Unisia Automotive Parts Co., Ltd. in China.
2009	Hitachi Automotive Systems is formed as an independent entity.
2023	Hitachi, Ltd. announces the sale of a portion of its shares, adjusting ownership stakes to Hitachi and Honda each holding 40%, and JIC Capital holding 20%.
2025	Company name changed to Astemo, Ltd.

== Global operations ==
As of 2025, Astemo operates over 100 business sites globally, including manufacturing plants, R&D centers and regional offices across Asia, Europe and the Americas.

Key locations include:

- Japan: Headquarters – Toform Yaesu Tower, Chuo-ku, Tokyo
- United States: R&D Center – Farmington Hills, Michigan
- United States: Manufacturing Plant – Berea, Kentucky, where Astemo is investing $153 million to expand production of electric vehicle components and create over 200 jobs
- Germany: European Technical Center – Schwaig-Oberding, Bavaria
- China: Powertrain Systems Facility – Qingpu District, Shanghai

Astemo's facilities span over 25 countries, including sites in Mexico, France, Brazil, Thailand and Vietnam. A complete list is available on the Astemo Global Network.

In September 2025, CBS News and The Detroit News reported that Astemo planned to establish a regional headquarters in Wixom, Michigan, as part of a $95 million investment expected to create about 200 jobs.

== Motorsports and sponsorships ==
Hitachi Astemo sponsors Team Penske in NTT IndyCar Series in the U.S.A.

Astemo also sponsors Real Racing in the Super GT GT500 class and S.I. RACING in the MFJ All Japan Road Race Championship Series.

Astemo owns the Japanese women's volleyball team "Hitachi Astemo Rivale" and sponsors Mie Honda Heat, a Japanese rugby union team based in Suzuka City.

== Misconduct ==
On December 21, 2021, Hitachi Astemo admitted to falsifying inspection data on brake and suspension components. Over 50,000 instances of improper testing were identified, dating back to 2003.
