= Suzuki CS =

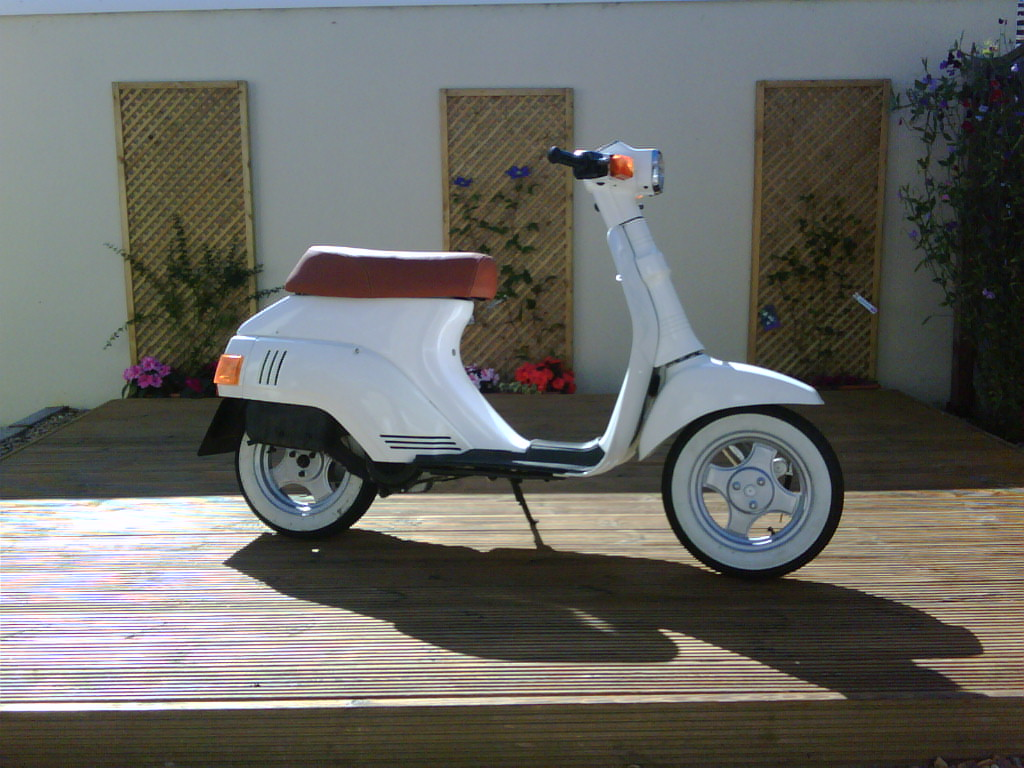
- 1983 Suzuki CS50 DD, UK specification
- Manufacturer: Suzuki
- Also called: Suzuki Gemma; Puch Lido; Suzuki Roadie
- Production: 1982–1988
- Assembly: Japan, Austria
- Class: Scooter
- Engine: Near vertical 49–79 cc (3.0–4.8 cu in) two-stroke, 125 cc (7.6 cu in) four-stroke, air-cooled single
- Transmission: 3 speed, automatic with wet multi-plate centrifugal clutch
- Frame type: Step through pressed steel monocoque underbone
- Suspension: Front: Mono-fork, Trailing link, telescopic shock Rear: Integrated engine/gearbox swingarm, telescopic shock
- Brakes: Front: drum Rear: drum
- Weight: 65–80 kg (143–176 lb) (dry)
- Fuel consumption: 100 mpg_{‑imp} (2.8 L/100 km; 83 mpg_{‑US})

The Suzuki CS is a series of scooters/mopeds that were produced between 1982 and 1988 by the Suzuki Motor Corporation in Japan. The line-up consisted of three basic models, the CS50 (49cc two-stroke engine), CS80 (79cc two-stroke) and CS125 (125cc four-stroke). The CS series were marketed as the 'Suzuki Gemma' in Asia, and the 'Suzuki Roadie' in the UK and Australasia. The CS series was also produced under licence and sold in continental Europe as the 'Puch Lido'.

Unusually, for this class of vehicle, all versions were equipped with a very reliable fully automatic three-speed gearbox, with the primary method of drive being a chain. The CS50 and CS80 are virtually mechanically identical, the main differences being a two-person seat, larger brakes (foot operated on rear) and larger headlight on CS80. The CS125 is almost entirely different and shares very few interchangeable parts.

The CS50 was available with kick-start only (6 volt electrics), and electric start and kick start (12 volt electrics).
