= Yamaha Lagenda =

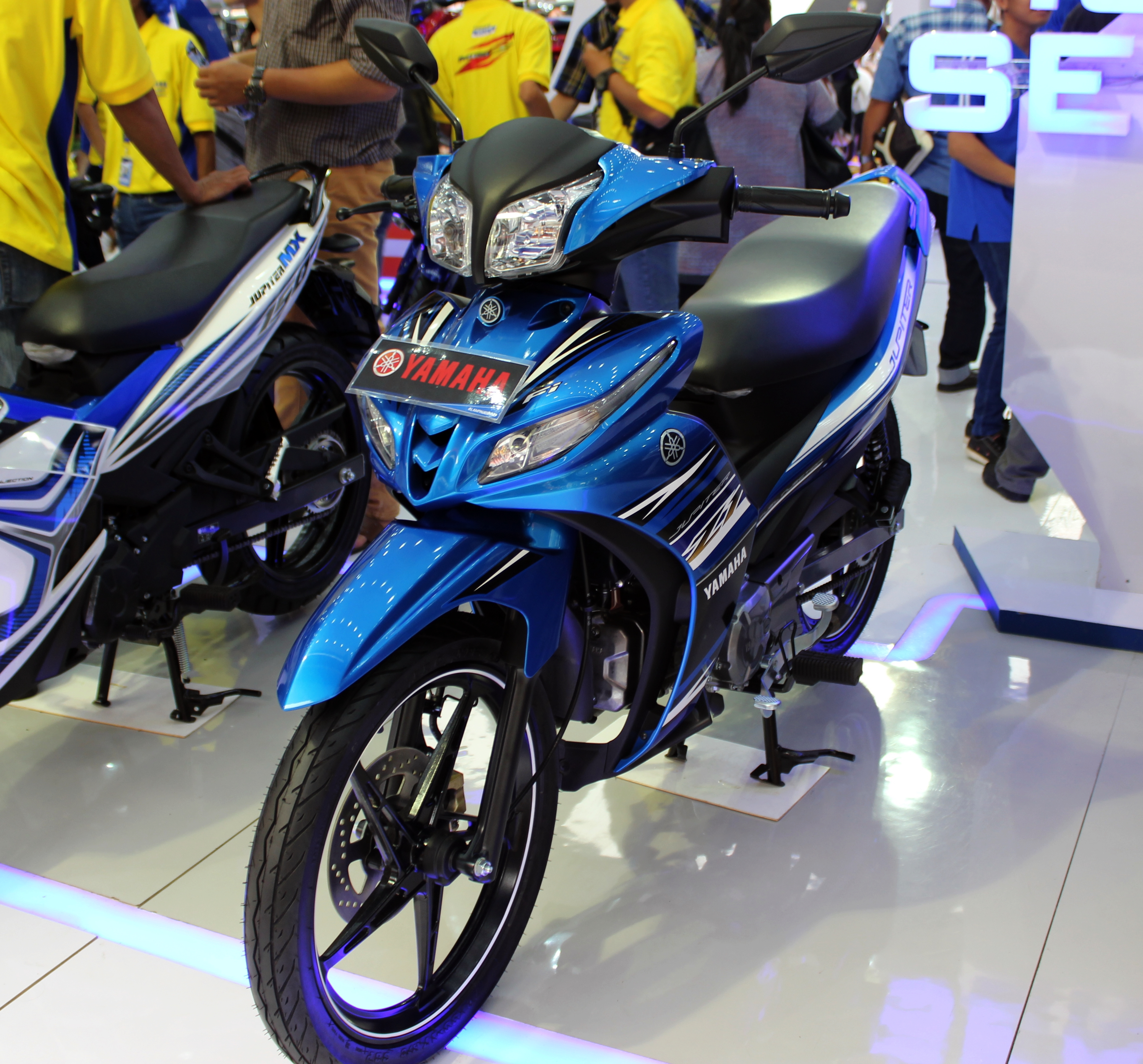
- Yamaha Jupiter Z1 115 (Indonesia)
- Manufacturer: Yamaha Motor Company
- Parent company: Yamaha Corporation
- Production: 2000–2024
- Predecessor: Yamaha SRX 100
- Class: Moped/Underbone

Yamaha Lagenda (known as Jupiter Z in Indonesia & Vietnam. Vega in the Philippines and Spark Re in Thailand) is a series of underbone motorcycle produced by Yamaha for the Southeast Asian market. It was introduced for the 2000 model year replacing the SRX 100. A more performance-oriented version of the Lagenda is marketed as ZR.

== Model history ==
The Yamaha Lagenda series consists 5 generation from 2000 until now. 5 models has been introduced to market since then.

=== 2000–2003 ===
2000–2003
- Also called: Yamaha Jupiter 100 (Indonesia)
- Production: 2000–2003
- Engine: 100 cc SOHC Air-cooled
- Power: 6.1 kW @ 8,000 rpm
- Torque: 8.5 N.m @ 5,500 rpm
- Transmission: Constant mesh 4 forward speed rotary
- Frame type: Backbone
- Suspension: Front: Telescopic fork Rear: Absorber swingarm
- Brakes: Front: Hydraulic Single Disc Brake; Rear: Drum Brake
- Tires: Front: 2.25-17 33L Rear: 2.50-17 38L
- Wheelbase: 1,210mm
- Dimensions: L: 1,890mm W: 670mm H: 1,050mm
- Seat height: 765mm
- Weight: 94kg (dry); 99kg (wet)
- Fuel capacity: 4.5 litres

SR Lagenda 100cc - (2000–2003) The SR Lagenda is the first model of the Lagenda series. Launched by a Japanese motorcycle racer Norifumi Abe, it was built as the successor of the SRX 100. The new model is equipped with a re-engineered air-cooled four stroke engine to ensure better reliability and performance. It also has a high rigidly frame to ensure precise handling performance and stability. In addition, the Lagenda had a sporty and aerodynamic body with multi-reflector combination of headlight and tail-light. In Malaysia, the moped is sold at RM5,451 for the kick-start version and RM5,778 for the electric version. The motorcycle comes in three colours : orange, blue and red.

=== 2003–2005 ===
2003–2005
- Also called: Yamaha Jupiter Z 110 (Indonesia) Yamaha Lagenda 110 (Malaysia)
- Production: 2003–2005
- Engine: 110 cc SOHC Air-cooled
- Power: 6.6 kW @ 8,000 rpm
- Torque: 9.0 N.m @ 5,000 rpm
- Transmission: Constant mesh 4 forward speed rotary
- Frame type: Backbone
- Suspension: Front: Telescopic fork Rear: Absorber swingarm
- Brakes: Front: Hydraulic Single Disc Brake; Rear: Drum Brake
- Tires: Front: 70/90 – 17 38P Rear: 80/90 – 17 44P
- Wheelbase: 1,230mm
- Dimensions: L: 1,910mm W: 675mm H: 1,040mm
- Seat height: 760mm
- Weight: 97kg (dry); 102kg (wet)
- Fuel capacity: 4.5 L

Lagenda 110cc - (2003–2005) The Lagenda 110cc was simply the SR Lagenda with increased engine displacement. However, a few changes have been to the model, such as a more rigid chassis with slightly longer wheelbase and a more straight inlet tract from the carburetor to the inlet manifold, reducing the "puddling" effect. The moped is sold at RM4,388 for the kick-start version and RM4,688 for the electric version in Malaysia. In motor sports, the Lagenda 110 has gained a very good reputation as a racing machine as the bike had won almost all podium positions for every round during the Malaysian Cub Prix.

=== 2005–2010 ===
2005–2010
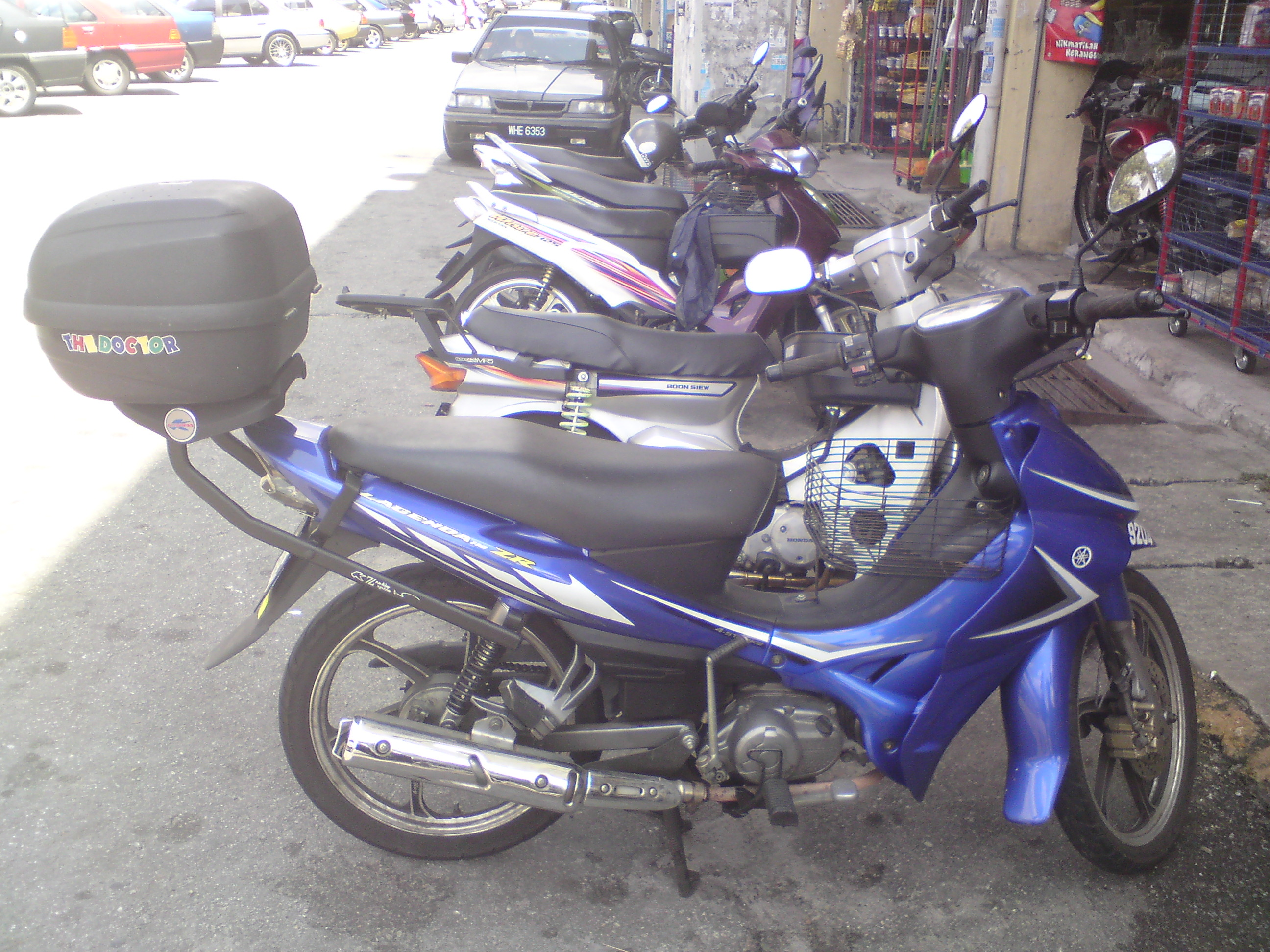
- Also called: Yamaha Jupiter Z 110 (Indonesia)
- Production: 2005–2010
- Engine: 110 cc SOHC Air-cooled
- Power: 6.6 kW @ 8,000 rpm
- Torque: 9.0 N.m @ 5,000 rpm
- Transmission: Constant mesh 4 forward speed rotary
- Frame type: Backbone
- Suspension: Front: Telescopic fork Rear: Absorber swingarm
- Brakes: Front: Hydraulic Single Disc Brake; Rear: Drum Brake
- Tires: Front: 70/90 – 17 38P Rear: 80/90 – 17 44P
- Wheelbase: 1,230mm
- Dimensions: L: 1,910mm W: 680mm H: 1,050mm
- Seat height: 760mm
- Weight: 97kg (dry); 102kg (wet)
- Fuel capacity: 4.5 L

Lagenda Z 110cc - (2005–2010) The Lagenda Z is the facelifted version of the Lagenda 110cc and began production in 2005. The model was facelifted in January 2008, returning the former "Lagenda" logo from the Lagenda 110. The 2008 model is equipped with a key slot cover for better protection against theft. The moped is sold at RM4,686.35 for the kick-start version and RM4,999.25 for the electric version in Malaysia.

Lagenda ZR 110cc - (2005–2010) A modified version of the Lagenda Z for those who prefer more sporty features. Prominent features include sport rims, electric starter, and the rear absorbers have extra oil canisters for a smoother ride on uneven roads. This model is only available in blue and has exactly the same engine specification as the Lagenda Z.

=== 2010–2013 ===
2010–2013
- Also called: Yamaha Lagenda Malaysia
- Production: 2010–2013
- Engine: 115 cc SOHC Air-cooled
- Power: 6.0 kW @ 7,500 rpm
- Torque: 8.3 N-m @ 4,500 rpm
- Transmission: 4-speed
- Frame type: Backbone
- Suspension: Front: Telescopic fork Rear: Absorber swingarm
- Brakes: Front: Hydraulic Single Disc Brake; Rear: Drum Brake
- Tires: Front: 70/90 – 17 38P Rear: 80/90 – 17 44P
- Wheelbase: 1,235mm
- Dimensions: L: 1,930mm W: 680mm H: 1,065mm
- Seat height: 765mm
- Weight: 101kg (wet)
- Fuel capacity: 4.2 L

Lagenda 115Z - (2010–2013) The Lagenda 115Z uses a completely redesigned engine with larger 62 mm journal bearings that limits the engine speed, resulting in slightly lower power output.

Lagenda 115ZR - (2010–2013)

=== 2013–2023 ===
2013–2023
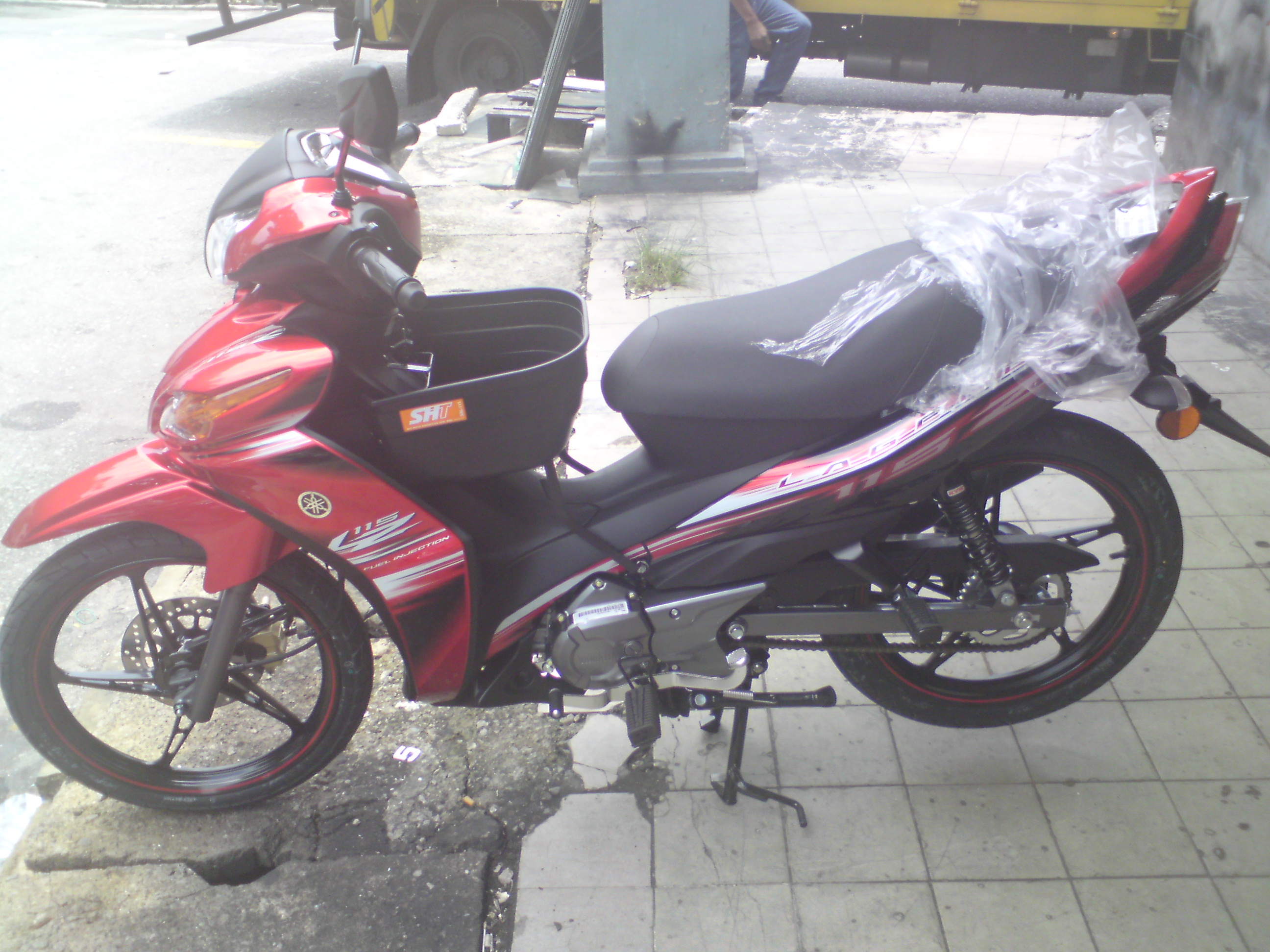
- Also called: Yamaha Jupiter Z1 115 (Indonesia); Yamaha Jupiter RC (Thailand & Vietnam); Yamaha Vega Force i (Philippines); Yamaha Lagenda ZL115 (Malaysia)
- Production: 2013–2023
- Engine: 115 cc SOHC Air-cooled
- Power: 7.4 kW @ 7,750 rpm
- Torque: 9.9 N-m @ 6,500 rpm
- Transmission: 4 Speed Constant Mesh Sequential
- Frame type: Backbone
- Suspension: Front: Telescopic fork Rear: Absorber swingarm
- Brakes: Front: Hydraulic Single Disc Brake; Rear: Drum Brake
- Tires: Front: 70/90 – 17 38P Rear: 80/90 – 17 50P
- Wheelbase: 1,240 mm
- Dimensions: L: 1,935 mm W: 680 mm H: 1,065 mm
- Seat height: 765 mm
- Weight: 100kg (wet)
- Fuel capacity: 4.05 L

Yamaha Lagenda 115Z Fuel Injection - (2013–present) The 2013 Yamaha Lagenda 115Z Fuel Injection uses a completely new 113.7 cc fuel-injected engine that offers 20% improvement over the older engine in terms of power and fuel economy. The Malaysian model uses the same design as the Indonesian 2013 Yamaha Jupiter Z1, while the Thai model uses a completely different design.
