= Modenas CT series =

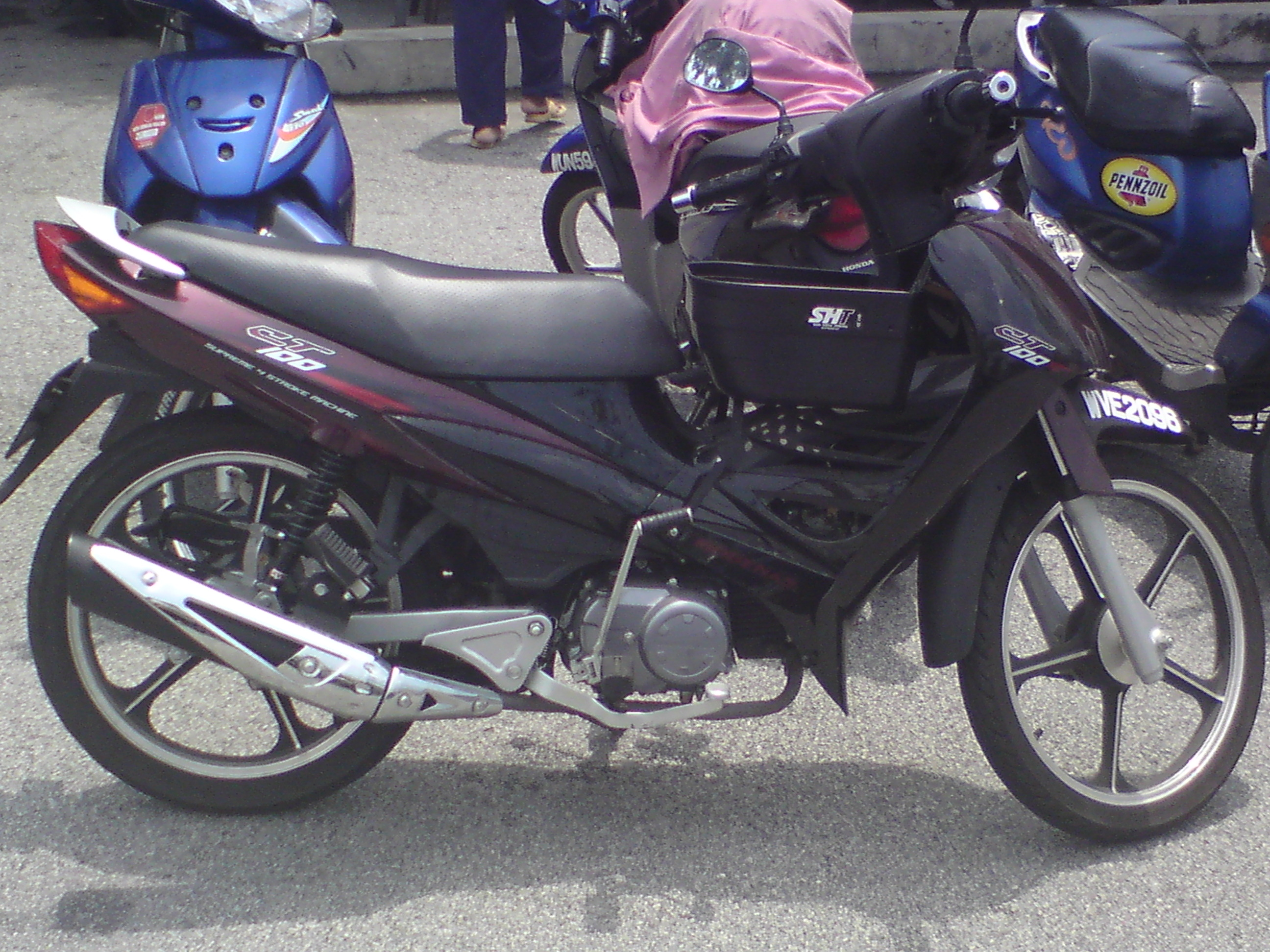
- Also called: Modenas Kriss 125i EFI (Greece); Modenas 118EFI (Malaysian fuel-injected model)
- Production: 2009-present
- Predecessor: Modenas Kriss; Modenas Kristar
- Class: Underbone
- Engine: 100-120 cc SOHC 2-valve 4-stroke air-cooled 1.0 kW BLDC (CTric)
- Power: 5.76 kW (7.83 PS) @ 8,000 rpm (120 cc fuel-injected model); 6.6 kW (9.0 PS) @ 8,500 rpm (110 cc model); 5.0 kW (6.8 PS) @ 7,500 rpm (100 cc model); 3.6 kW (4.9 PS) @ 80 km/h; ratified as 1.0 kW (CTric)
- Torque: 8.4 N⋅m (6.2 lb⋅ft) @ 4,000 rpm (120 cc fuel-injected model); 9.3 N⋅m (6.9 lb⋅ft) @ 4,000 rpm (110 cc model); 6.7 N⋅m (4.9 lb⋅ft) @ 5,500 rpm (100 cc model)
- Transmission: 4-speed (other models); Single-speed (CTric)
- Suspension: Front: Telescopic fork Rear: Swingarm
- Brakes: Front: Disc (other models); drum (100 cc model); Rear: Drum
- Fuel capacity: 4.3 L (fuel-injected model); 5.3 L (other variants)
- Related: Modenas Kriss; Modenas GT128

Modenas CT series is a series of underbone motorcycles produced by Malaysian motorcycle manufacturer, Modenas. The CT were first launched in 2009 as a legitimate successor of the popular Modenas Kriss series. Before the CT was developed, another underbone model known as Modenas Kristar was produced in 2004 but the production ended two years later due to lack of appeal. The 100 cc and 110 cc engines derived from the Kriss series remain unchanged, but with the addition of a decompression mechanism for the 110 cc model to ease starting.

In 2011, an electric version of the CT known as the Modenas CTric was launched, making the CTric as the first all-electric motorcycle being sold in Malaysia.

In 2013, the fuel-injected version of the CT was launched in Greece as Modenas Kriss 125i EFI. The fuel-injected model is later released for Malaysian domestic market as Modenas 118EFI.

== Model history ==
The CT was debuted on 23 October 2009 for the 110 cc model. It features an all-new design developed in-house by Modenas, with the exception of the AN110 engine developed by Kawasaki. Later, the 100 cc model was released on 13 February 2010, with same MB100 engine derived from Kriss 100. Both models have a 5.3-liter fuel tank each, which is claimed by Modenas as the largest among underbone motorcycles at that time, before being surpassed by the 2012 Honda Future 125.

=== Modenas CTric (2011-present) ===
In 2010, Modenas developed an electric motorcycle model through a partnership with Universiti Sains Malaysia. According to Modenas, the CTric is the first Malaysian-made electric motorcycle that has passed the latest SIRIM MS2413 standard for electric motorcycles as well as the JIS standards.

The electric motorcycle is powered by a brushless DC electric motor, producing the peak power of 3.6 kW at the speed of 80 km/h, though ratified at 1.0 kW. Power is supplied by five 12-volt nano-gel batteries capable of producing 60 V, 20 Ah of electricity. The motorcycle can be recharged by using an ordinary BS 1363 240-volt, 13-amp power outlet, with the charging times of 3.5 hours (fast charging) or 8 hours (slow charging). Once fully charged, the CTric's traveling range is between 30 and 50 km.

The performance of the CTric is comparable with a 90 cc underbone motorcycle, with the top speed of about 70–80 km/h.

=== Modenas 118EFI / Kriss 125i EFI (2013-present) ===
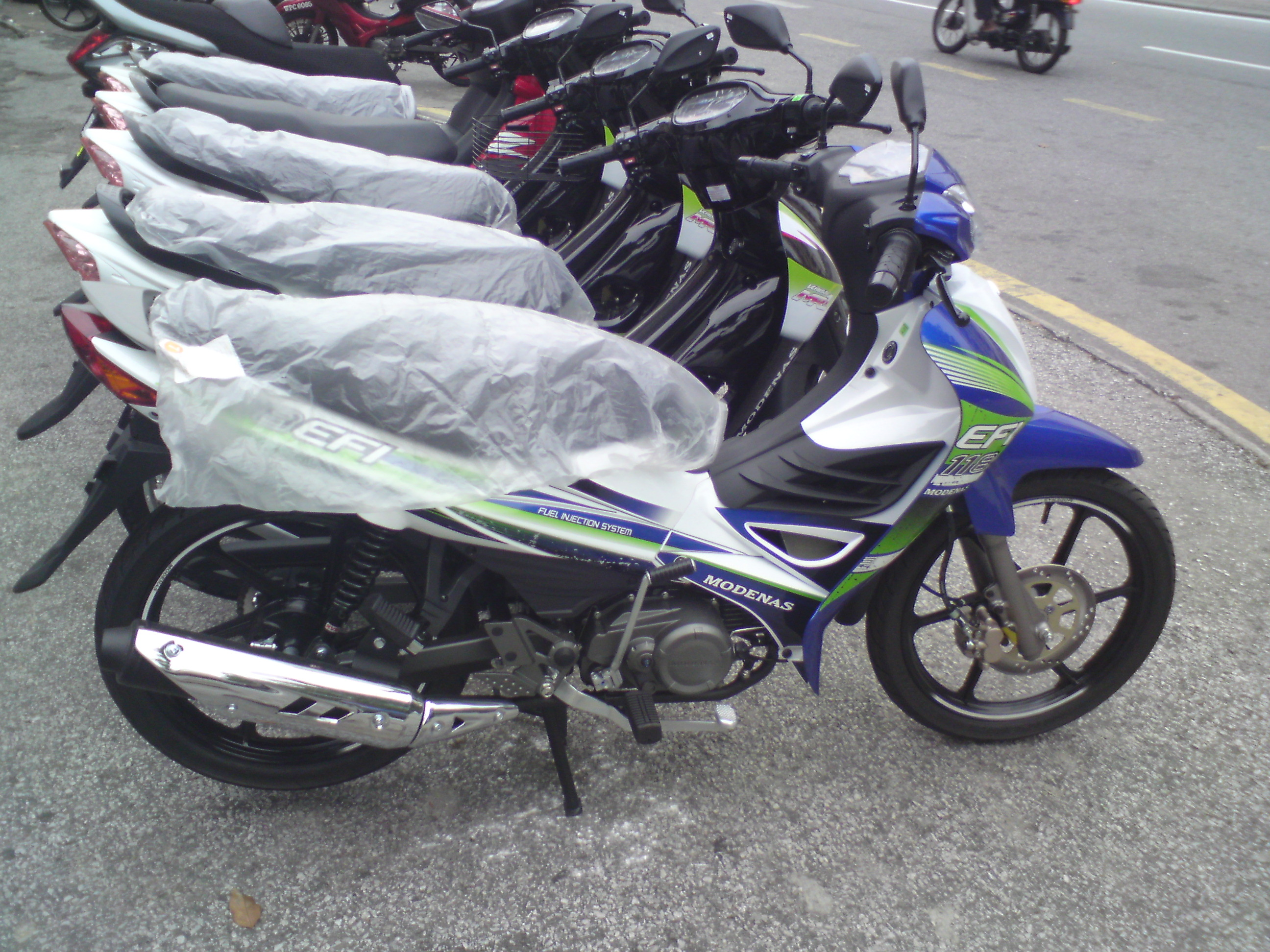
The fuel-injected Modenas 118EFI.

On 22 March 2013, Modenas launched the fuel-injected version of the CT in Greece as Modenas Kriss 125i EFI. The Kriss 125i uses the larger 120 cc engine mated together with the fuel injection system with a lambda sensor supplied by Synerject. The same model was later launched in the home market as the Modenas 118EFI during the DRB-Hicom Autofest in Penang on 30 July 2013. The fuel-injected variant uses the same 120 cc engine being derived from the Kriss 120 and Ace 115 but with slightly lower power output. The 118EFI was sold in Malaysia with the price tag of RM4,755.00.

== Award ==
- 2011 Malaysia Good Design Mark - Public Area and Transport Category (together with Modenas GT128)
