= Yamaha Lexam =

- Manufacturer: Yamaha Motor Vietnam
- Parent company: Yamaha Motors, Japan
- Production: 2009–present
- Class: Underbone
- Engine: 113.7 cc (6.94 cu in), 4 stroke, 2 valve, SOHC, air-cooled, single
- Bore / stroke: 50 mm × 57.9 mm (1.97 in × 2.28 in)
- Transmission: Chain-driven CVT
- Brakes: Disc / drum
- Wheelbase: 1,240 mm (49 in)
- Dimensions: L: 1,920 mm (76 in); W: 680 mm (27 in); H: 1,075 mm (42.3 in)
- Seat height: 760 mm (30 in)
- Fuel capacity: 4.1 L (0.90 imp gal; 1.1 US gal)
- Oil capacity: 0.9 L (0.20 imp gal; 0.24 US gal)

Yamaha Lexam is a motorcycle manufactured and designed for the Southeast Asia market by Yamaha Motor Vietnam. Lexam is an underbone and uses the Yamaha Compact Automatic Transmission (Y-CAT), a compact CVT transmission with chain. It was introduced in 2009 in Vietnam and in 2010 in Indonesia.
