= Modenas Kriss series =

Modenas Kriss

Overview
- Production: 1996–present

Body and chassis
- Class: Underbone Motorcycle

First generation
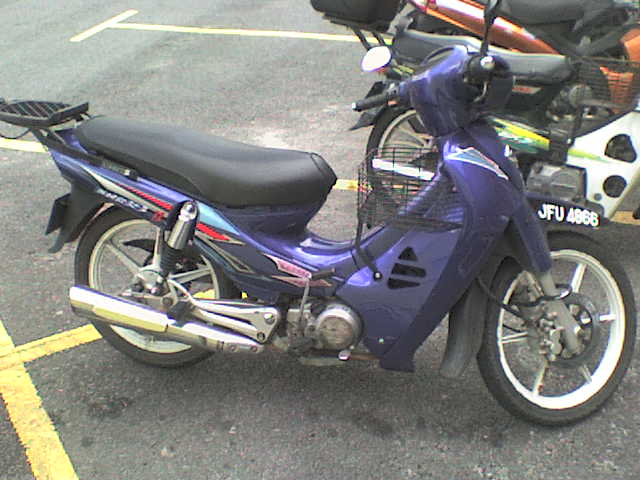
- Manufacturer: Modenas
- Also called: Tondro Bahman a/b, Jahanro Keyvan/Kayak (Iran)
- Production: 1996–2019
- Class: Underbone
- Engine: 120.2 cc (7.3 cu in); 111.6 cc (6.8 cu in); 97.2 cc (5.9 cu in); SOHC 2-valve 4-stroke air-cooled
- Bore / stroke: 55.0 mm × 50.6 mm (2.17 in × 1.99 in)(120cc); 53.0 mm × 50.6 mm (2.09 in × 1.99 in)(110cc); 50.0 mm × 49.5 mm (1.97 in × 1.95 in)(100cc)
- Compression ratio: 9.0:8 (120cc); 9.3:1 (110cc); 9.0:1 (100cc)
- Power: 7.3 kW (9.9 PS) @ 8,500 rpm (120 cc model); 6.6 kW (9.0 PS) @ 8,500 rpm (110 cc model); 5.0 kW (6.8 PS) @ 7,500 rpm (100 cc model)
- Torque: 9.1 N⋅m (6.7 lb⋅ft) @ 4,500 rpm (120 cc model); 9.3 N⋅m (6.9 lb⋅ft) @ 4,000 rpm (110 cc model); 6.7 N⋅m (4.9 lb⋅ft) @ 5,500 rpm (100 cc model)
- Ignition type: Magneto to CDI
- Transmission: 4-speed (Semi-Automatic): Return(Down) (110cc); Rotary (100cc & 120cc)
- Frame type: Steel pipe backbone
- Suspension: Front: Telescopic fork Rear: Trailing swingarm
- Brakes: Front: Disc; Drum; Rear: Drum
- Tires: Front: 70/90-17; Rear: 80/90-17
- Rake, trail: 27°, 79mm
- Wheelbase: 1,245 mm (49.0 in)
- Dimensions: L: 1,910 mm (75 in); W: 670 mm (26 in); H: 1,050 mm (41 in)
- Seat height: 750 mm (30 in)
- Weight: 96 kg (100cc); 98-101kg (110cc & 120cc) (dry)
- Fuel capacity: 4.3 L (0.95 imp gal; 1.1 US gal)
- Oil capacity: 1.1 L (0.24 imp gal; 0.29 US gal) (110cc & 120cc); 0.9 L (0.20 imp gal; 0.24 US gal) (100cc)
- Fuel consumption: 47 km/L (130 mpg_{‑imp}; 110 mpg_{‑US}) @ 80 km/h (120cc); 44 km/L (120 mpg_{‑imp}; 100 mpg_{‑US}) @ 90 km/h (110cc); 46.2 km/L (131 mpg_{‑imp}; 109 mpg_{‑US}) @ 80 km/h (100cc)
- Related: Modenas CT series Modenas Ace 115; Modenas Kristar

The Modenas Kriss series is the debut 4-stroke underbone motorcycle series by Malaysian motorcycle manufacturer, Modenas. The original Kriss 110 was developed through a partnership with Kawasaki, which partly owned Modenas, based on Kawasaki Kazer 110 underbone model.

It began production in August 1996 and previewed to the public during Malaysian National Day parade in 1996. The motorcycle was launched by former Malaysian Prime Minister Mahathir Mohamad on 3 October 1996.

Since its debut in December 1996 for the original 110 cc model with drum brakes, the Modenas Kriss became one of the most popular 4-stroke underbone motorcycle in Malaysia, attaining a peak of over 50% of the Malaysian 4-stroke underbone market in 2000 and 2001.

The Kriss series has spawned several variants, including the front disc brake model in 1999, the 100 cc model in 2004, and the 120 cc model in 2007.

== Etymology ==
The Kriss is named after a Malay traditional weapon, kris, which inspire Malaysians to "thrust forward (in the development of the nation)", though some motorcycle shops in the United Kingdom had mistakenly advertised the model to be named from the acronym of a famous American motorcycle racer, Kenny Roberts because Modenas had once built some racing motorcycles for Modenas KR Motorcycle Grand Prix team.

== Model history ==
The Modenas Kriss 110 was launched in May 1996. It was previewed to public during the Hari Merdeka celebration in 1996. It was built based on Kawasaki Kazer AN110 underbone motorcycle but with a slightly different styling. The Kriss also uses the same Kawasaki AN110 engine as the Kazer.

Since 1997, the Kriss became one of the most popular 4-stroke underbone in Malaysia, with about 99,800 units (or 46% of the Malaysian 4-stroke underbone market segment) being sold during its debut year. The success of the Kriss was contributed by several factors such as affordability, performance, reliability, spare parts availability, and very good fuel economy. Due to the success of the Kriss 110, the Kriss series has spawned several variants, including the front disc brake model in 1999, the 100 cc model in 2004, and the 120 cc model in 2007. A lower-cost 110 cc variant known as Kriss SG was also produced in 2002 but being phased out later due to unappealing design.

In 2000, the AN110 engine was retuned to increase its power rating from 7.5 PS (5.5 kW) in the original Kriss to 9.0 PS (6.6 kW). The fuel consumption of the Kriss 110 is very good, clocking 44 km/L (100 mpg_{‑US}) at the constant speed of 107 km/h (66 mph).

The Kriss was facelifted in 2003, featuring the newer lights, newer graphics and full colour body panels. In 2007, the second-generation Kriss was launched. The second-generation Kriss uses a new 120 cc engine which is essentially a rebored AN110 engine, with a revised camshaft profile being dubbed as MAC-S (Modenas Advanced Camshaft System).

There are two attempts by Modenas to introduce a legitimate successor of the Kriss. The first attempt was the Modenas Kristar which was launched in 2004 but the production ended in 2006 due to lack of appeal. It was only in 2009 that Modenas had finally launched the legitimate successor of the Kriss series, known as the Modenas CT series, with the 100 and 110 cc engines being derived from the Kriss series. As a result, the Kriss 100 and Kriss 110 were being phased out to make way for the CT series, leaving the Kriss 120 as the only Kriss variant being sold.

In 2012, the Kriss family lineup was revised once again, by reinstating the 100 cc variant currently known as the Kriss MR1 (MR1 stands for "Motosikal Rakyat 1Malaysia" or 1Malaysia People's Motorcycle), launched in December 2011, while the 120 cc variant was phased out to make way for the Ace 115.

=== Export market ===
The Modenas Kriss was first being exported in 1997, with Cambodia and Greece became the earliest export market. Soon, the Kriss series were also being made available in other countries such as United Kingdom, South Africa, Iran, Vietnam, Turkey, Argentina, Malta and Brunei. In Cambodia, Iran and Vietnam, the Kriss is sold as CKD models.

== See also ==
- Modenas CT series
