= Malaysian Cub Prix =

Moped racing series in Malaysia

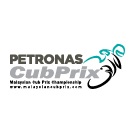
- 2021 Malaysian Cub Prix Logo
- Category: Motorcycle sport
- Country: Malaysia
- Region: National
- Inaugural season: 1994
- Classes: CP150; CP125; Wira; PETRONAS Sprinta Pro-Am Cup; Yamaha PETRONAS Super Series; Honda Dash 125 Challenge; Aeon Credit Service Yamaha NVX Challenge
- Constructors: Honda; Modenas; Suzuki; Yamaha; Voge
- Official website: malaysiancubprix.com

CP150
- Riders' champion: Azroy Hakeem Anuar
- Constructors' champion: Honda
- Teams' champion: Honda Yuzy Idemitsu Team

CP125
- Riders' champion: Mohd Adib Rosley
- Constructors' champion: Yamaha
- Teams' champion: Ipone Yamaha YY Pang Racing Team

Wira
- Riders' champion: Mohd Aqil Danial Rasul
- Constructors' champion: Yamaha
- Teams' champion: PETRONAS Sprinta Yamaha-31 Racing

The Malaysian Cub Prix Championship is a national-level underbone or moped racing series for motorcycles with displacements from 100 to 150cc. The tournament is a grassroots developer with the main objective of discovering and developing Malaysian motorcycle racing talents.

The title sponsor of the championship is Petronas and it is supported by motorcycle manufacturers Yamaha, Honda, and Suzuki.

== History ==
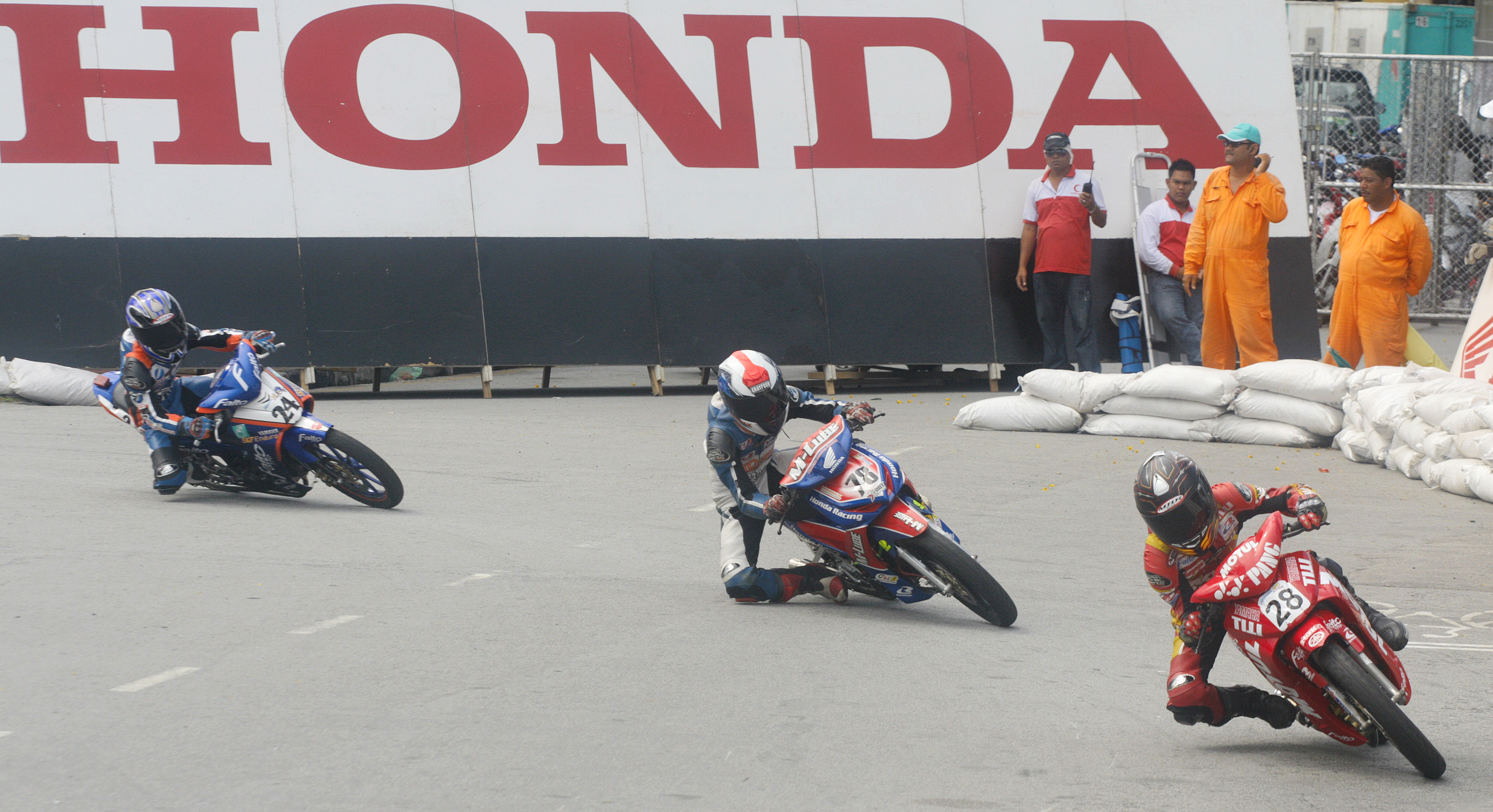
2011 Cub Prix Penang Stage

The name Cub Prix itself is derived from the moniker Cub 仔. Pronounced ‘cub chai’ or ‘kapcai’, the phrase literally means Little Cub in Cantonese and refers to the original Honda Cub (Honda 50 that was introduced by Soichiro Honda in 1958). Today, the name has become synonymous with underbone motorcycles in Malaysia.

Begun in 1994, the concept was to create a motorsports championship that was accessible to people from all walks of life. That is why, to this day, Cub Prix races predominantly on the streets with a maximum of two rounds per year held at permanent circuits.

To date, Cub Prix is still the only mobile motorsports event that brings the excitement of motorcycle racing to its fans throughout the country. Through Cub Prix's mobility, the championship has visited every major town and city in Malaysia. A typical season for Cub Prix consists of 10 rounds beginning in late March and ending in December with a two-month break in between for the Ramadan and Shawwal celebrations.

== Underbone ==
The underbone motorcycle was born in Asia in 1958 when Soichiro Honda rolled out the first Honda 50.

An underbone motorcycle is a small motorcycle built around a single tube frame called the underbone. This ‘underbone’ supports the whole vehicle and runs low all across the length of the motorcycle. There is a similarity in appearance to the scooter, largely due to the fuel tank position, the open-frame design which the fuel tank position allows and the splash guards. However, the entire power train, namely the engine position, power transmission and wheels are based on the design of conventional motorcycles.

The position of the fuel tank, in fact, located below the seat, is the main aspect that truly differentiates the underbone with other conventional motorcycles. This allows for a design that improves ease of mounting and dismounting, making the underbone popular with consumers of both genders.

The engine size of a typical underbone motorcycle can range between 80cc to 150cc. In the early years, two-stroke engines were the norm, but come the turn of the millennium, the four-stroke evolution picked up speed.

The technical sophistication of larger motorcycles such as fuel injection systems, capacitor discharge ignition and electric starters, were gradually fused into the underbone. With each addition, the underbone became zippier, sportier and trendier.

== Objectives ==
Since its inception, Cub Prix's main objective was to build a base of grassroots talents from which Malaysian riders can be filtered through to the higher levels of racing. Grassroots development formed a significant part in the growth of any sport.

== Race Categories ==
The actual format of the race classes and their technical regulations differ from season to season, evolving either in response to, or to trigger changes in the industries.

In 2017, the race categories are as follows:

=== Open-Make Categories ===
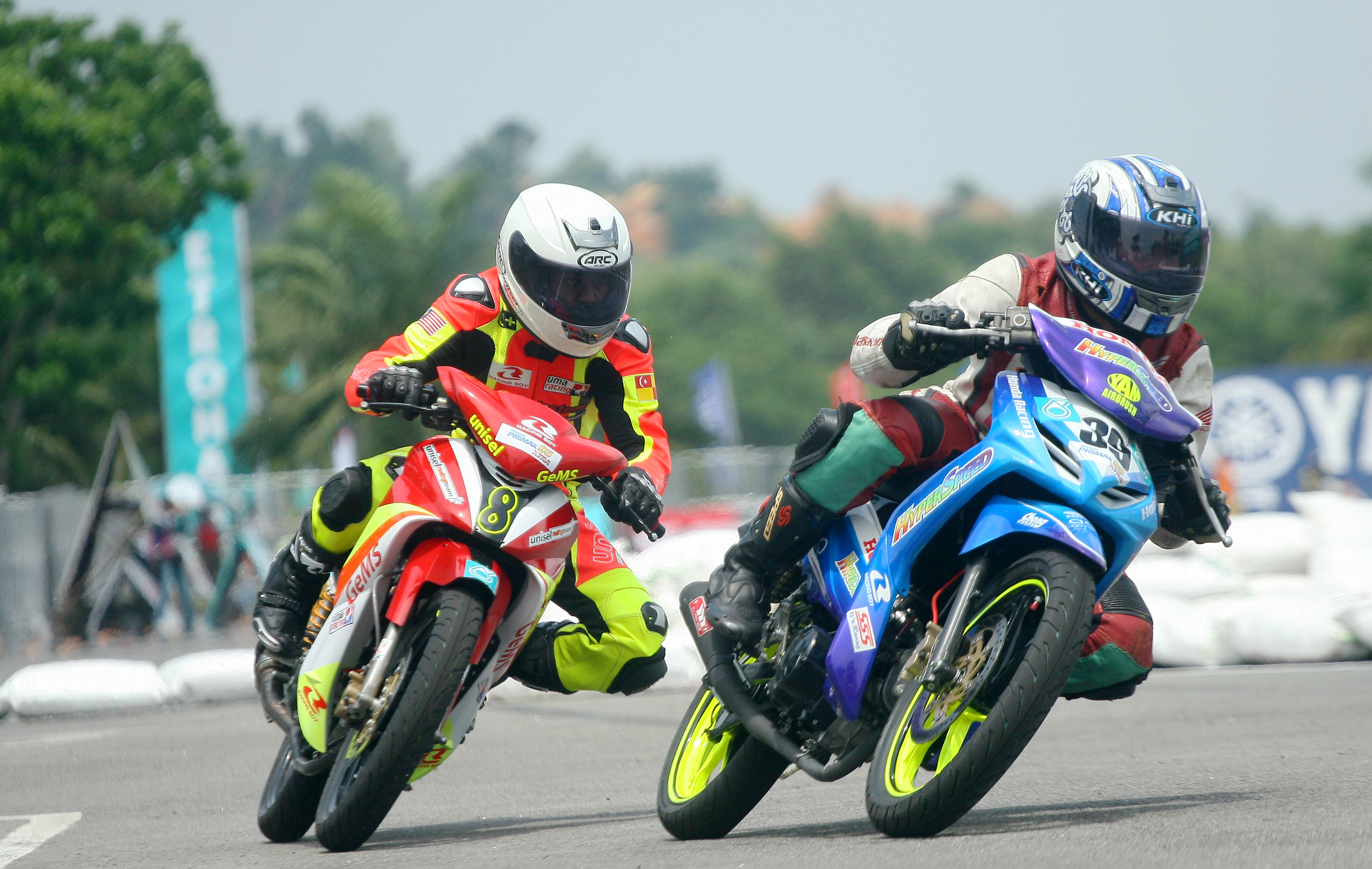
2012 Cub Prix Season

- CP150 – A new class opened for Malaysian Cub Prix 24 for the year 2017, with introduction of new cub bikes with larger engine capacity for the year 2016. Due to this had increased demand for this class to be opened, requested by public, manufacturers to enhance more marketing and interest as cub class motorcycles continues to grow in the country. It replaces the former CP130 by increasing the engine capacity of category and due to this implementation, most team are able to utilize fuel injection systems in their bikes to qualify for Euro inspection races as required by FIM. For this class, it will be the first time fuel injection systems being used in Cub Prix history. Formerly known as the Expert class, this is the premiere class of the Malaysian Cub Prix.
- CP125 – Intermediary category for riders who have had some racing experience but are not yet ready to race in the hyper-competitive CP150 class.
- Wira – This is an age-restricted class only for riders aged between 13 years to 17 years old.

=== Semi-Amateur Category ===
- Privateer – This is strictly for privateer riders who race without factory backing.

=== One-Make Categories ===
The one-make categories of the Malaysian Cub Prix play a vital role in the effort to bring in more fresh talent every season. Fully supported by motorcycle manufacturers Honda, Suzuki and Yamaha, the manufacturers prepare the bikes for the riders who are also supplied with the proper racing gear and safety attire. The one-make races, therefore, become ideal platforms for first-time newbies to break into the sport. To qualify for the one-make races, the riders must range from ages 13 to 20 and must be first-time riders in Cub Prix. In 2017, the one-make categories are:

- Yamaha PETRONAS Super Series
- Honda Dash 125 Challenge
- Aeon Credit Service Yamaha NVX Challenge

The Malaysian Cub Prix is only open to Malaysian riders only and all entries must hold the appropriate racing license issued by the Motorsports Association of Malaysia (MAM).

== Key Milestones ==
- 1994: First Cub Prix race on May 8, 1994, in Melaka.
- 2002: Introduction of the age-restricted Wira class specifically for riders below-21 years of age. This is Cub Prix's first 4-stroke class. Since then, the age ceiling has been progressively dropped as part of the Championship's drive to attract more younger riders who will be able to enjoy a longer international career.
- 2003: Petronas signed on as title sponsor of the Malaysian Cub Prix.
- 2005: The introduction of the Team Award in the Expert class, aimed at creating recognition for the teams’ efforts to develop new talents, added heat to the competition.
- 2006: The Novice class was transformed from 2-stroke 110cc to 4-stroke 115cc. The age-ceiling in the Wira class was lowered to under-19. The landmark year also saw the old making way for the new. Veteran names like M. Meganathan, Wazi Abdul Hamid, Shahrun Nizam Tamin, Chia Tuck Cheong and Soong Chee Kieong announced their retirements. A new batch of riders quickly came in to fill the void.
- 2007: The Malaysian Cub Prix went from a one-day event to a two-day event, giving more track time to the riders.
- 2008: The migration from 2-stroke to 4-stroke was finally complete when the 4-stroke 125cc class was introduced for the Expert category.
- 2009: Race classes were rebranded. The Expert category was renamed the CP130 class and the Novice category was renamed as the CP115 class. Nasha Edziera Bahauddin, the first woman rider, starts competing in Cub Prix.
- 2017: CP150 class replaces the CP130.
- 2020: CP125 class replaces CP115

== Creating Malaysian Champions ==
In 2009, the key teams and sponsors of the Malaysian Cub Prix came together as an industry to launch its first mega-project. A wildcard development programme aimed at training Malaysian riders to race in the World Motorcycle Grand Prix. After an exhaustive training and selection process, Elly Idzlianizar Ilias and Zulfahmi Khairuddin made their GP125 debut. From there, Zulfahmi was given the opportunity to race full-season in the GP125 class of the MotoGP and became the 2nd Malaysian to do so after Shahrol Yuzy.

In 2010, the wildcard project moved from the GP125 class to the newly introduced Moto2 class. Only one rider was selected – Md Zamri Baba.

In 2011, the wildcard project was expanded to two riders – Md Zamri Baba and Hafizh Syahrin Abdullah.

== Future ==
The organiser considering to add a new 'Rookie' category into the championship because of overwhelming response received during the new season rider's registration. Organiser received near 1000 rider's applications for the Season 2017 championship.

In December 2017, Benelli, one of the oldest Italian motorcycle manufacturers, testing their prototype for CP150 class category. Currently, there are only two constructors competes in CP150 class which is Honda and Yamaha.

With Modenas expected to launch their new supermoped in 2018, it is very likely Modenas will compete in the CP150 class in the future.

== List of Motorcycle Manufacturers ==
- Yamaha
- Suzuki
- Honda
- Modenas

== Full Champions List ==
Year	Expert	Novice					
1994	M. Meganathan (Suzuki)	Alizan Tambi (Yamaha)					
1995	M. Meganathan (Suzuki)	Choo Chee Hoong (Yamaha)					
1996	Wazi Abdul Hamid (Suzuki)	Abdul Halim Zahid (Yamaha)					
1997	Chia Tuck Cheong (Yamaha)	Rosnizam Mohd Noor (Yamaha)					
1998	Mohd Faisal Yahya (Yamaha)	Abd Jabar Che Mat (Yamaha)					
Year	Expert	Novice	Yamaha 125Z Challenge				
1999	M. Meganathan (Suzuki)	Choo Chuen Hoong (Yamaha)	Irwan Rosli				
2000	M. Meganathan (Suzuki)	Mohd Hatta Turin (Suzuki)	Abd Rahim Sidek				
2001	Chia Tuck Cheong (Yamaha)	Abdul Rahim Sidek (Yamaha)	Yap Chee Loong				
Year	Expert	Novice	Wira	Yamaha 125Z Challenge			
2002	Ahmad Fuad Baharudin (Yamaha)	Yap Chee Loong (Yamaha)	Mohd Syahnas Shahidan (Yamaha)	Mior Aripin Mior Abd Salim			
2003	Shahrun Nizam Tamin (Yamaha)	Mohd Syahnas Shahidan (Yamaha)	Mohd Firdaus Manan (Yamaha)	Safrizan Buang			
Year	Expert	Novice	Wira	Yamaha Nouvo Challenge			
2004	K. Sivanesan (Yamaha)	Mohd Yusri Ibrahim (Yamaha)	Mohd Zamri Baba (Yamaha)	Mohd Nazim Abd Latip			
Year	Expert	Novice	Wira	Yamaha Nouvo Challenge	Modenas Kristar Challenge		
2005	Norizman Ismail (Yamaha)	Mohd Zanardi Azahar (Yamaha)	Mohd Iskandar Raduan (Yamaha)	Elly Idzliaikmal Ilias	Sharil Salleh		
Year	Expert	Novice	Wira	Yamaha 135LC Challenge	MZ Mantizz 125 Challenge		
2006	Mohd Suhadi Ali Rahmat (Yamaha)	Mohd Zamri Baba (Yamaha)	Ridwan Bakri (Yamaha)	Elly Idzlianizar Ilias	Mahadhir Raduan		
Year	Expert	Novice	Wira	Honda Wave 125-S Challenge	Yamaha GiVi Cup	MZ Mantizz 125 Challenge	Junior GP Racing Dream
2007	Ahmad Fazli Sham (Yamaha)	Mohd Affendi Rosli (Yamaha)	Mohd Emir Firdaus Hasan (Yamaha)	Azlan Shah Saidun Hardi	Mohd Azwan Mohd Ridwan	Syuhaimi Man	Mohd Rozaliman Zakaria
Year	Expert	Novice	Wira	Honda Wave 125-S Challenge	Yamaha GiVi Cup		
2008	Ahmad Fazli Sham (Yamaha)	Abdul Muhaimin Roslan (Yamaha)	Zaidy Mohd Zaifaizal (Yamaha)	Mohd Taufiq Roslan	Mohd Rozaliman Zakaria		
Year	Expert	Novice	Wira	Honda Icon Challenge	Yamaha 135LC Cup		
2009	Ahmad Fuad Baharudin (Yamaha)	Hafizh Syahrin Abdullah (Yamaha)	Mohd Azhar Abd Jalil (Yamaha)	Mohd Syawalludin Mohd Zaki	Mohd Ramdan Mohd Rosli		
Year	CP130	CP115	Wira	Honda Icon Challenge	Yamaha 135LC Cup		
2010	Hafizh Syahrin Abdullah (Yamaha)	Mohd Ramdan Mohd Rosli (Yamaha)	Mohd Adib Rosley (Yamaha)	Mohd Hafizuddin Azahar	Tengku Amirul Haffiruddin		
Year	CP130	CP115	Wira	Privateer	Honda Wave Junior Challenge	Yamaha Ego LC Petronas Cup	
2011	Norizman Ismail (Honda)	Shahril Izzuwan Mohd Noor (Yamaha)	Zulsyafiz Rosli (Yamaha)	Wazir Abd Razak	Mohd Rabilfirli Azmin	Mohd Nasri Mohd Ishak	
Year	CP130	CP115	Wira	Privateer	Honda Future One-Make Challenge	Yamaha 135 Super Series PETRONAS	Suzuki Belang Challenge
2012	Azlan Shah Kamaruzaman (Honda)	Mohd Amirul Ariff Musa (Honda)	Mohd Hafiz Nor Azman (Yamaha)	Khairul Azizi Abd Mansor	Khairul Idham Pawi	Mohd Izzat Zaidi	Mohd Syafiq Rosli
2013	Ahmad Fuad Baharudin (Yamaha)	Ahmad Afif Amran (Yamaha)	Mohd Hafiza Rofa (Yamaha)	Ang Beng Seang	Mohd Izrul Huzaimie	Mohd Azam Omar	Tengku Syahmi Tuan Yusoff
Year	CP130	CP115	Wira	PETRONAS Sprinta Pro-Am Cup	Honda Future One-Make Challenge	Yamaha 135 Super Series PETRONAS	
2014	Mohd Zaqhwan Zaidi (Honda)	Mohd Izzat Zaidi (Yamaha)	Khairul Idham Pawi (Honda)	Mohd Imran Zulkafli	Saiful Azhary Muhammad	Mohd Irfan Rosnizam	
Year	CP130	CP115	Wira	PETRONAS Sprinta Pro-Am Cup	Honda Future One-Make Challenge	Yamaha PETRONAS Super Series	
2015	Ahmad Fazrul Sham (Yamaha)	Kasma Daniel Kasmayudin (Yamaha)	Mohd Harith Farhan Baharin	Azrulaffendi Hadi	Mohd Aznil Mohd Ali	Mohd Haqiz Mohd Fairues	

== See also ==
- Underbone
