= Centrifugal clutch =

Automatic clutch that uses centrifugal force to operate

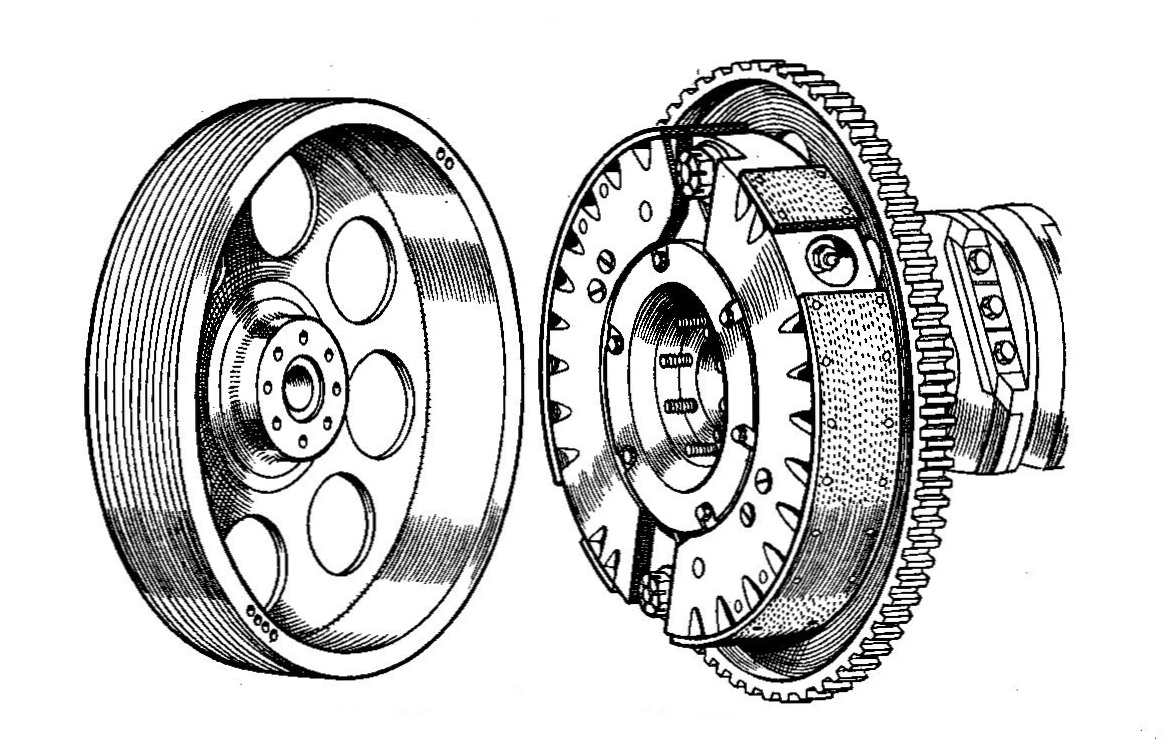
Talbot car's 'traffic clutch' of the 1930s

A centrifugal clutch is an automatic clutch that uses centrifugal force to operate. The output shaft is disengaged at lower rotational speed and engages as the output increases to a certain speed. It is often used in mopeds, underbones, lawn mowers, go-karts, chainsaws, mini bikes, and some paramotors and boats to keep the engine from stalling when the output shaft is slowed or stopped abruptly, and to remove load when starting and idling. It has been superseded for automobile applications by the fluid coupling, torque converter and automated manual transmissions.

== Principle ==
This works on the principle of centrifugal force, which means when engine speed reaches a specific rotational speed (often expressed in revolutions per minute or RPM) it generates enough centrifugal force inside the clutch which results in clutch engagement, and it transmits the engine power. At lower speeds, it disconnects itself to stop power transmission.

== Operation ==
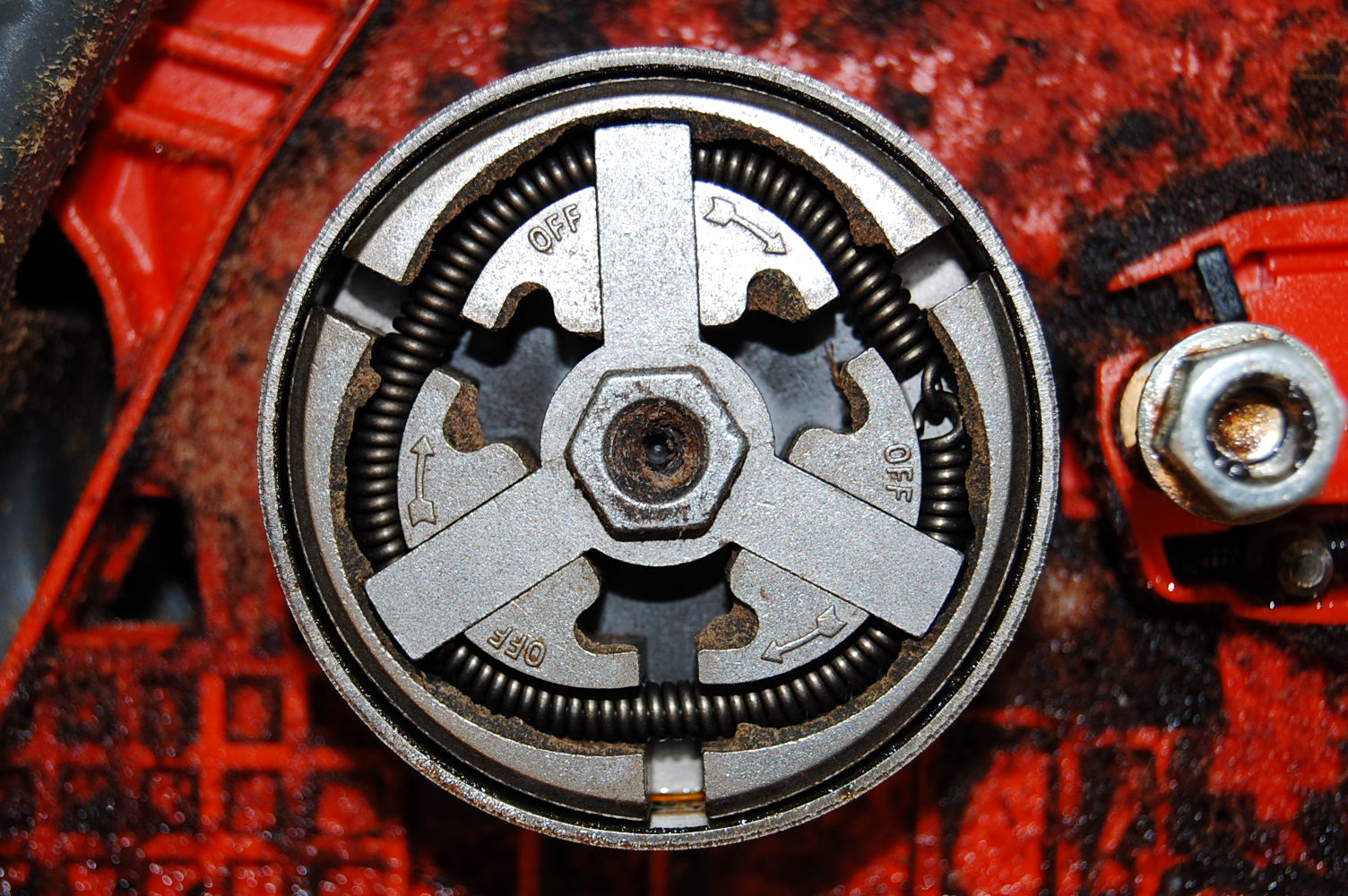
A chainsaw's clutch. The chain wraps around a sprocket behind the clutch that turns with the outer drum.

The input of the clutch is connected to the engine crankshaft while the output may drive a shaft, chain, or belt. As engine revolutions per minute increase, weighted arms in the clutch swing outward and force the clutch to engage. The most common types have friction pads or shoes radially mounted that engage the inside of the rim of a housing. On the center shaft, there is an assorted number of extension springs, which connect to a clutch shoe. When the central shaft spins fast enough, the springs extend, causing the clutch shoes to engage the friction face. It can be compared to a drum brake in reverse. This type can be found on most home-built karts, lawn and garden equipment, fuel-powered model cars, and low power chainsaws.

Another type used in racing karts has friction and clutch disks stacked together like a motorcycle clutch. The weighted arms force these disks together and engage the clutch. When the engine reaches a certain speed, the clutch activates, working somewhat like a continuously variable transmission. As the load increases, the speed drops, disengaging the clutch, letting the speed rise again, and reengaging the clutch. If tuned properly, the clutch will tend to keep the speed at or near the torque peak of the engine. This results in a fair bit of waste heat, but over a broad range of speeds, it is much more useful than a direct drive in many applications.

== History ==
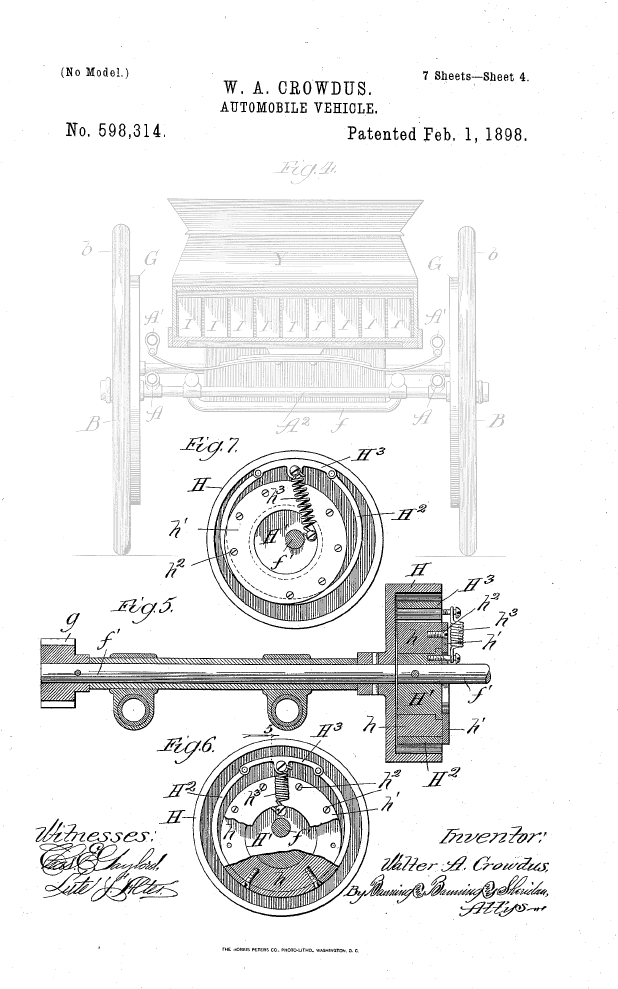
A centrifugal clutch shown in a patent application, 1898

Centrifugal clutches were used in railway locomotives before 1858, and referred to (in relation to electric motors) in a patent of 1899.

A patent was issued in the United States for an automotive centrifugal clutch (on an electric vehicle) in 1898.

There is a design for a toy 'automatic clutch' in Meccano Magazine of June 1934.

Armstrong Siddeley cars featured automatic (centrifugal) clutches beginning in 1936.

Thomas Fogarty, who is also credited with inventing the balloon catheter, is credited with inventing a centrifugal clutch for small motor applications in the 1940s.

== See also ==
- Saxomat
