= Motorcycle transmission =

Transmission for motorcycle applications

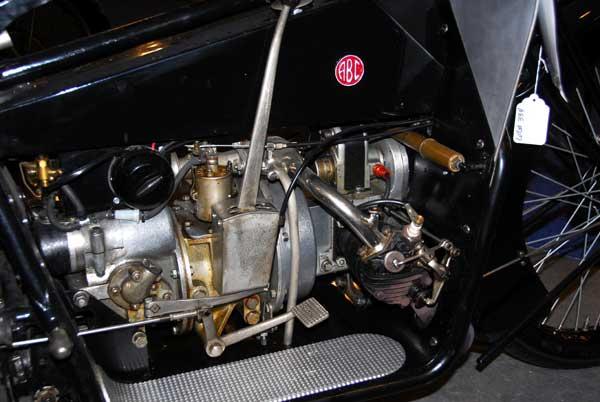
The transmission on this 1921 ABC motorcycle is located behind the engine and shifts by a long hand-operated lever on its right side.

A motorcycle transmission is a transmission created specifically for motorcycle applications. They may also be found in use on other light vehicles such as motor tricycles and quadbikes, go-karts, offroad buggies, auto rickshaws, mowers, and other utility vehicles, microcars, and even some superlight racing cars.

== Manual gearing ==
Most manual transmission two-wheelers use a sequential gearbox. Most motorcycles (except scooters) change gears (of which they increasingly have five or six) by a foot-shift lever. On a typical motorcycle, either first or second gear can be directly selected from neutral, but higher gears may only be accessed in order – it is not possible to shift from second gear to fourth gear without shifting through third gear. A five-speed of this configuration would be known as "one down, four up" because of the placement of the gears with relation to neutral, though some motorcycle gearboxes and/or shift mechanisms can be reversed so that a "one up, four down" shifting pattern can be used. Neutral is to be found "half a click" away from first and second gears, so shifting directly between the two gears can be made in a single movement.

== Automatic ==
Fully-automatic transmissions are far less common on motorcycles than manuals, and are mostly found only on motor scooters, mopeds, underbones, minibikes, and some custom cruisers and exotic sports bikes. Types include: hydraulic automatic transmission, continuously variable transmission, and dual-clutch automatic transmissions.

== Semi-automatic ==
Semi-automatic transmissions on motorcycles are also referred to as auto-clutch transmissions, or sometimes, clutchless manual transmissions. They function in the same way as a conventional fully-manual motorcycle with a sequential gearbox, except they utilize a fully-automatic clutch system, or sometimes torque converter, but still require the rider's input to manually actuate change gears. They are much less common than motorcycles with conventional manual transmissions, typically use a centrifugal clutch, and are mostly found on smaller motorcycles, such as minibikes, underbone (step-thru) motorcycles (e.g., the Honda Super Cub), smaller dirt bikes (such as pit bikes), and various (mostly older) mopeds and motor scooters. Semi-automatic transmissions are often erroneously called "automatic" transmissions, which is only partially correct but not fully correct, since the rider's input is still required for switching gears, and these transmissions will not automatically change gears by themselves.

Other applications of semi-automatic transmissions on motorcycles include the Yamaha FJR1300AE sport-touring motorcycle, with the YCCS automatic clutch system, Honda's range of 2- and 3-speed Hondamatic semi-automatic transmissions, used on various motorcycles throughout the 1970s and 1980s, and the three-wheeled BRP Can-Am Spyder Roadster motorcycle, with its SE5 and SE6 range of transmissions. Some high-performance sport bikes also use a trigger-shift system, with a handlebar-mounted trigger, paddle, switch, or button, and an automatically-operated clutch system.

Quickshifters are electronic devices that allow for clutchless upshifts (and usually downshifts) on high-performance motorcycles with a standard manual transmission. An ECU works in conjunction with a sensor and a microcontroller (CPU) to cut the ignition and/or fuel injection momentarily, so the rider can switch gears. Bi-directional quickshifters are technically considered semi-automatic since clutch actuation isn't required whatsoever, however, mono-directional quickshifters, such as those used on the 2016 Kawasaki Ninja ZX-10R and the Ninja H2/R, only work on upshifts, and the rider still has to manually actuate the clutch and blip the throttle on downshifts, so it's not really semi-automatic, in that sense.

== Reverse gear ==
The weight of the largest touring motorcycles (sometimes in excess of 360 kg or 800 lbs) is sometimes such that they cannot effectively be pushed backwards by a seated rider, and they are fitted with a reverse gear as standard. In some cases, including the Honda Gold Wing and BMW K1200LT, this is not really a reverse gear, but a feature of the starter motor which when reversed, performs the same function. To avoid accidental operation, the reverse is often engaged using an entirely separate control switch - e.g., a pull-toggle at the head of the fuel tank - when the main gearshift is in neutral.

== Shift control ==
In earlier times (pre-WWII), hand-operated gear changes were common, with a lever provided to the side of the fuel tank (above the rider's leg). British and many other motorcycles after World War II used a lever on the right (with the brake on the left), but today gear-changing is standardised on a foot-operated lever to the left.

== Scooters, underbones, and miniatures ==
Traditional scooters (such as the Vespa) still have manual gear-changing by a twist grip on the left-hand side of the handlebar, with a co-rotated clutch lever. Modern scooters were often fitted with a throttle-controlled continuously variable transmission, thus earning the term twist-and-go.

Underbone and miniature motorcycles often have a three to five-speed foot-shift lever, but the clutch is automatic (usually a centrifugal clutch). This type of clutchless (no manual clutch) transmission still must have the gears shifted manually by the rider, and the system is commonly known as a semi-automatic transmission.

== Clutch ==
The clutch in a manual-shift motorcycle transmission is typically an arrangement of plates stacked in alternating fashion, one geared on the inside to the engine and the next geared on the outside to the transmission input shaft. Whether wet (rotating in engine oil) or dry, the plates are squeezed together by springs, causing friction build up between the plates until they rotate as a single unit, driving the transmission directly. A lever on the handlebar exploits mechanical advantage through a cable or hydraulic arrangement to release the clutch spring(s), allowing the engine to freewheel with respect to the transmission.

Automatic and semi-automatic transmissions typically use a centrifugal clutch which operates in a different fashion. At idle, the engine is disconnected from the gearbox input shaft, allowing both it and the bike to freewheel (unlike torque converter automatics, there is no "idle creep" with a properly adjusted centrifugal clutch). As the throttle is opened and engine speed rises, counterweights attached to movable inner friction surfaces (connected to the engine shaft) within the clutch assembly are thrown gradually further outwards, until they start to make contact with the inside of the outer housing (connected to the gearbox shaft) and transmit an increasing amount of engine power. The effective "bite point" is found automatically by equilibrium where the power being transmitted through the (still-slipping) clutch is equal to what the engine can provide. This allows relatively fast full-throttle takeoffs (with the clutch adjusted so the engine will be turning near its maximum-torque rpm) without the engine slowing or bogging down, as well as more relaxed starts and low-speed maneuvers at lower throttle settings and RPMs.

Above a certain engine speed - when the bike is properly in motion, so the gearbox input shaft is also rotating quickly and so allowing the engine to accelerate further by way of clutch slip - the outward pressure of the weighted friction plates is sufficient that the clutch will enter full lock-up, the same as a conventional plate-clutch with a fully released lever or pedal. After this, there is no clutch slip, and the engine is locked to and providing all of its available power to the transmission; engine rpm is now dependent on the road speed and the current gear ratio (under either user control in a semi-auto, or reliant on-road speed (and sometimes load/throttle position) in a CVT setup). In a typical CVT, the gear ratio will be chosen so the engine can reach and maintain its maximum-power speed as soon as possible (or at least, when at full throttle, in a partially load-dependent system), but in a semi-auto, the rider is responsible for this choice, and they can ride around all day in top gear (or first) if they so prefer. Also, when the engine is turning fast enough to lock the clutch, it will stay fully engaged until the RPMs fall below that critical point again, even if the throttle is fully released. Below the lock-up point, partially or fully releasing the throttle can lead to the RPM falling off rapidly, thanks to the feedback loop of lower engine speed meaning less friction pressure. This toggle-like mode of operation can lead to certain characteristic centrifugal-clutch-automatic behaviour, such as being able to freewheel rapidly downhill from a standstill, with engine braking only being triggered by turning the throttle briefly (and not then cancellable without braking to quite a slow, gear-dependent pace), and lockup triggering at a lower speed with full versus minimal throttle.

== Construction ==
Pre-unit construction, also called separate construction, is a motorcycle engine architecture where the engine and gearbox are separate casings. In unit construction the engine and gearbox share a single housing.

In many modern designs, the engine sits in front of the gearbox. From a sprocket on one side of the crankshaft, a chain or sprocket directly mounted to the clutch will drive the clutch, which can often be found behind a large circular cover on one side of the gearbox. The clutch is connected to the gearbox input shaft. For motorcycles with chain drive, the gearbox output shaft is typically connected to the sprocket which drives the final drive chain.

Most modern manual motorcycle gearboxes have "constant-mesh" gears which are always mated but may rotate freely on a shaft until locked by a toothed sliding collar, or "dog clutch". Since the gears are always rotating and can only be accessed sequentially, synchromesh is not generally needed. To save space, both shafts may contain a mixture of fixed and free-spinning gears, with some gears built into the sliding parts.
