= Underbone =

Type of motorcycle

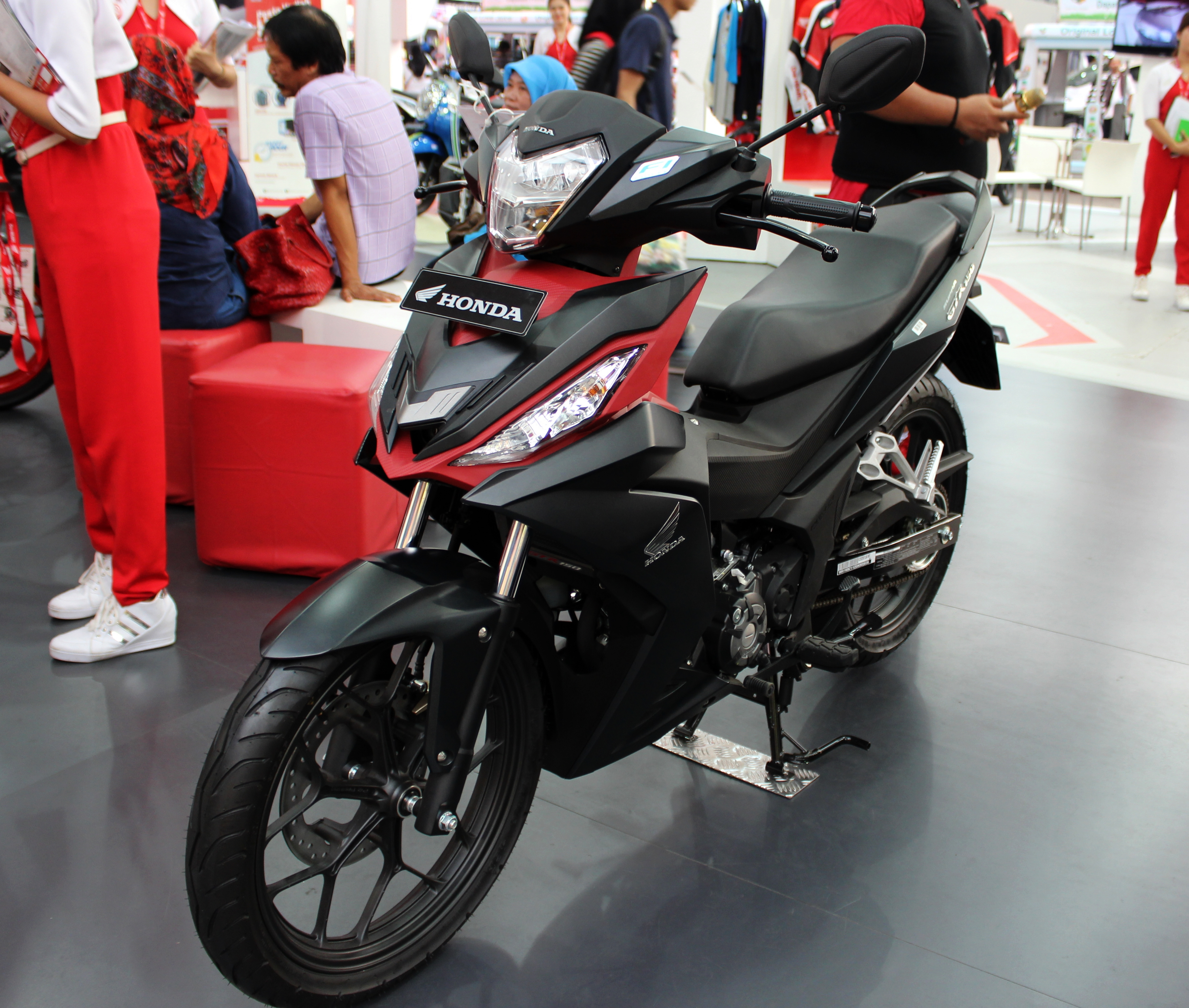
Honda Winner, an underbone with 150 cc engine displacement.

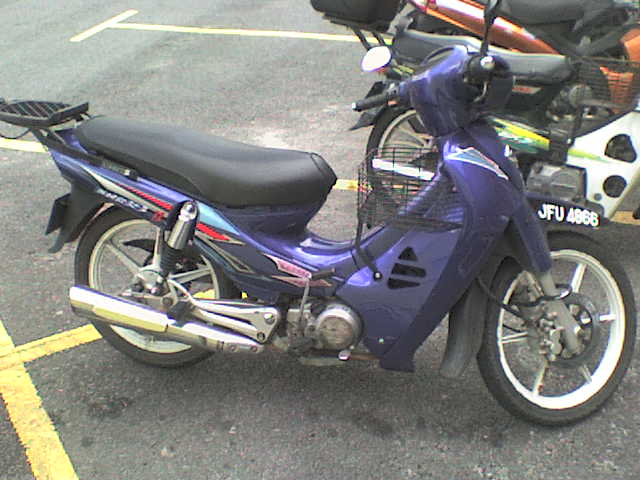
Plastic panels and covers are widely used on modern underbones e.g. Modenas Kriss 2.

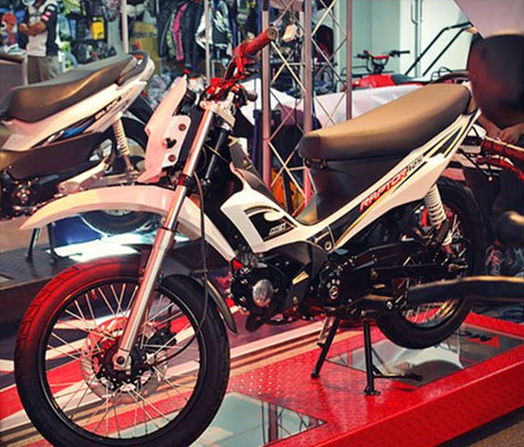
MCX Raptor, an underbone from the Philippines.

An underbone is a type of motorcycle that uses structural tube framing with an overlay of plastic or non-structural body panels and contrasts with monocoque or unibody designs where pressed steel serves both as the vehicle's structure and bodywork. Outside Asia, the term underbone is commonly misunderstood to refer to any lightweight motorcycle that uses the construction type known colloquially as step-throughs, mopeds or scooters.

An underbone motorcycle may share its fuel tank position and tube framing, along with fitted bodywork and splash guards with a scooter while the wheel dimensions, engine layouts, and power transmission are similar with conventional motorcycles.

Unlike conventional motorcycles, underbones are mostly popular in Asia and Greece. In Indonesia, the fourth most populous country in the world, and the largest country in Southeast Asia, almost half the population have a motorcycle, most of which are underbones and scooters. (120 million in 2018, compared to 16 million cars).

== Design ==
The appearance and frame of an underbone are quite different from that of a standard motorcycle, but the powertrain is functionally almost identical. The underbone engine is positioned between the rider's feet but the rear wheel is driven by a regular motorcycle secondary chain drive. Styling considerations only mean that the chain-driven nature of the machine tends to be concealed under sheet-metal covers to a greater extent than that of motorcycles.

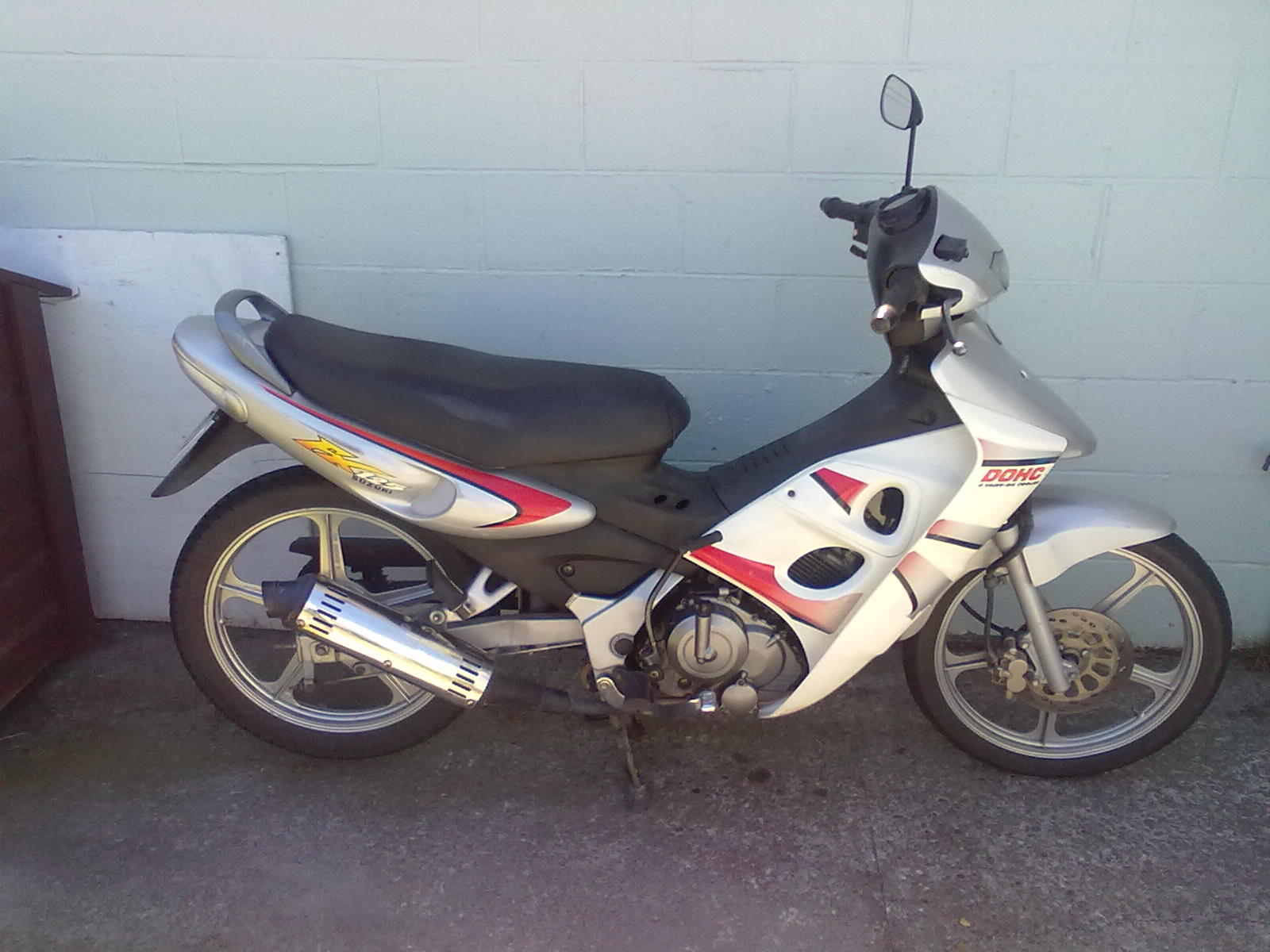
Plastic panels and covers are widely used on modern underbones, such as a Suzuki FX125

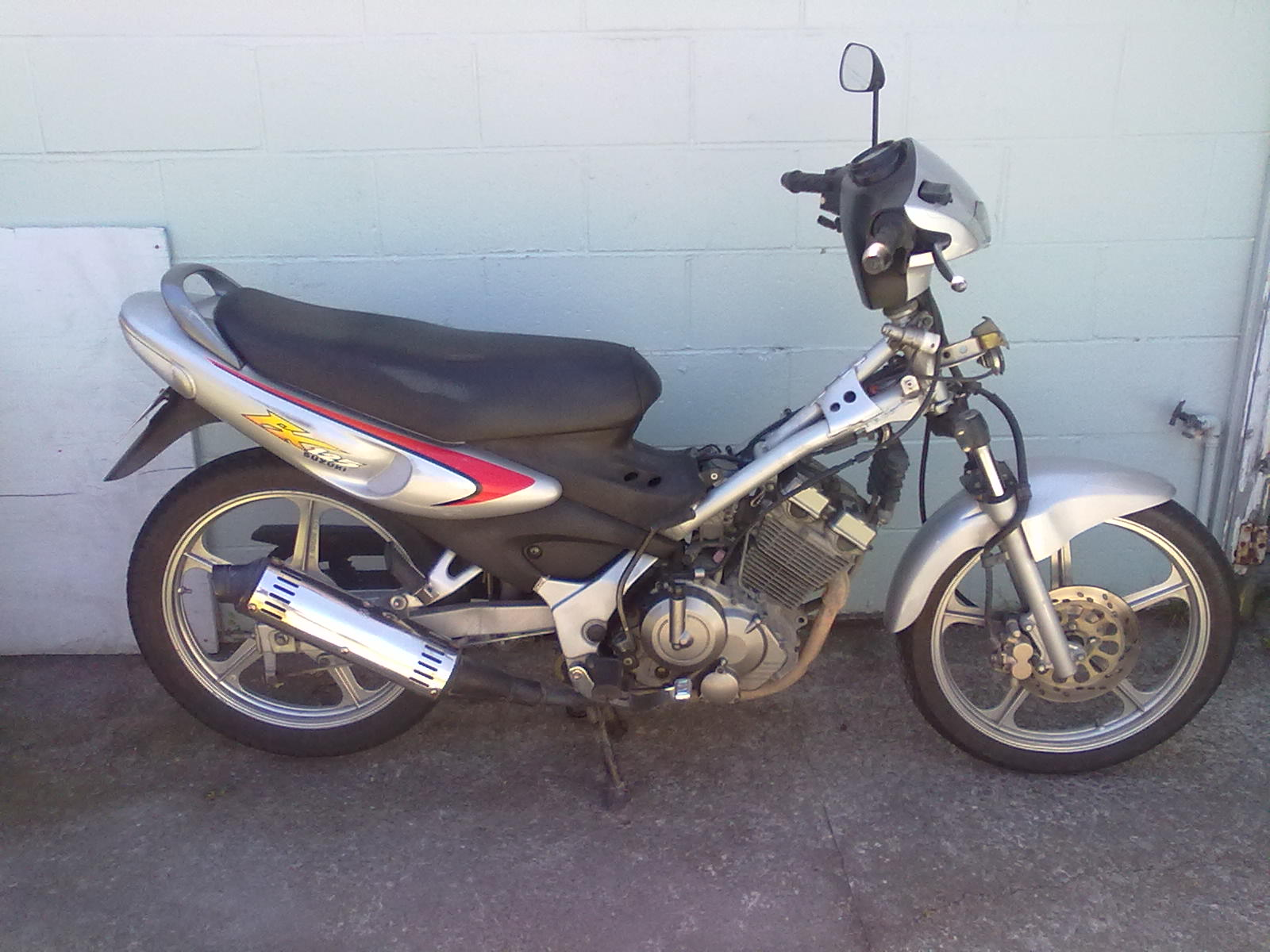
A Suzuki FX125 with covers removed

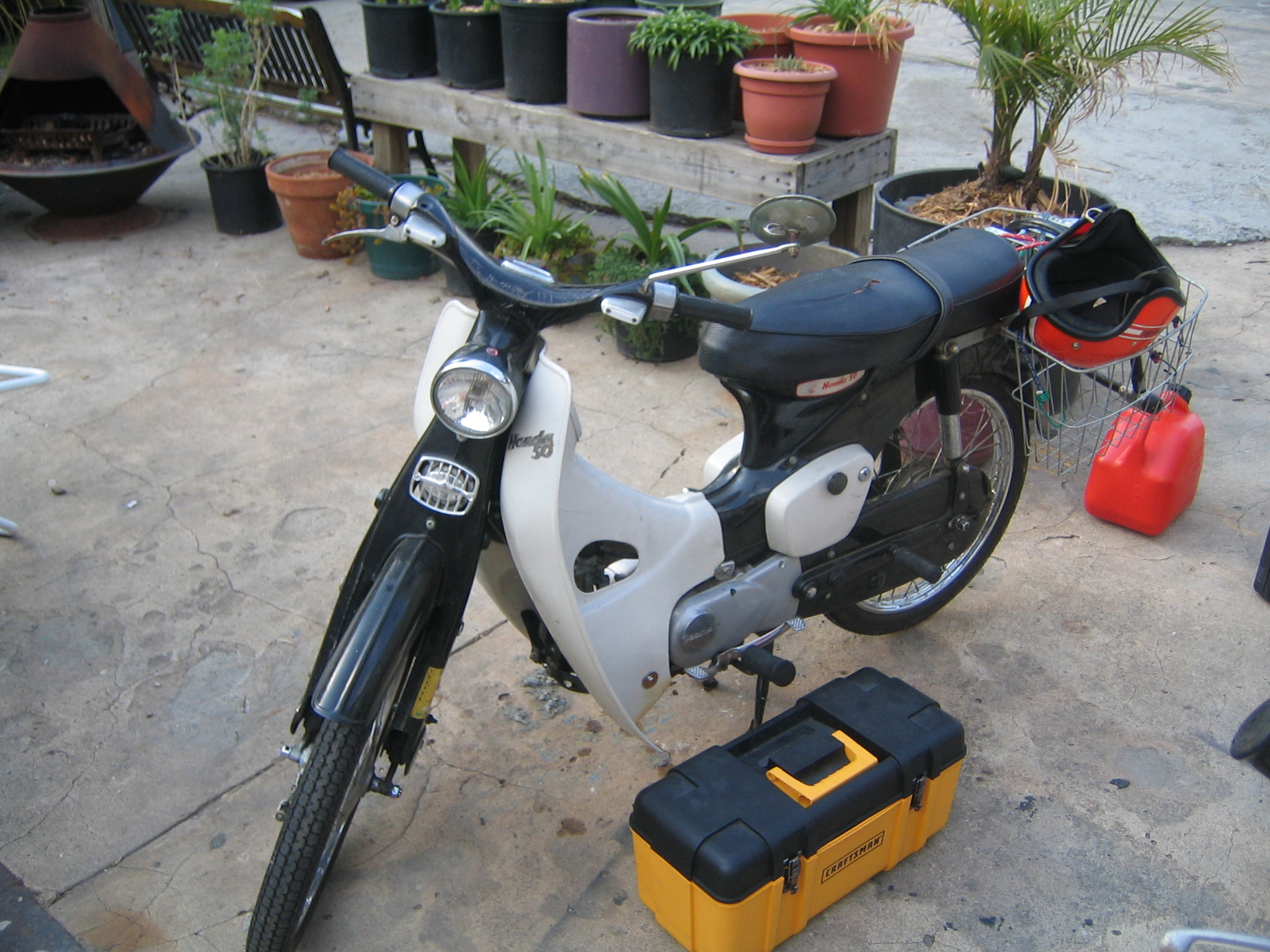
An early underbone design: the Honda Super Cub, the most produced motor vehicle ever.

In only one significant respect does the underbone differ from the conventional motorcycle - there is no frame member or fuel tank between the seat base and the headstock. Generally, the fuel tank is located under the seat. The underbone arrangement improves the ease of mounting and dismounting and contributes to the cross-gender appeal of the layout as an around-town shopping and commuter vehicle. The engine displacement of a typical underbone motorcycle is generally between 50 cc and up to about 150 cc, though much larger ones are available. Currently, production underbone model with the largest engine displacement is the SYM VF3i, which is powered by a fuel-injected 183 cc SOHC 4-valve water-cooled engine.

Historically, underbones popularized semi-automatic transmissions and indicator systems. In other respects, the technical sophistication of underbones tended to lag those of larger motorcycles, but nowadays they are increasingly equipped with similar electronic ignition, fuel injection, etc.

Underbones do not have large footrests on the sides (compared to scooters/mopeds), this makes it easier, safer and more comfortable to ride on rough roads or off-road. As the rider can more easily stand up or put both feet on the ground while riding, to shift centre of gravity, smooth out rough roads with knees in half-standing, maintain stability and control. Similar to techniques commonly used in dirt biking or mountain biking.

Underbones may have spoked or alloy wheels that are spindle mounted and usually sized to fit small conventional motorcycle frames. These provide much better road-holding and braking than scooters, though it does make punctures more difficult to repair

Underbones generally features a three- to six-speed sequential gearbox, either with an automatic clutch, usually a centrifugal clutch, or a conventional manual hand clutch. Depending on whether the motorcycle has a manual hand clutch or an automatic centrifugal clutch, determines whether the motorcycle transmission is a semi-automatic (automatic clutch) or a manual transmission. It is then coupled to a sprocket and chain drive to transmit power to the rear wheel. There are some exceptions to this, such as the Yamaha Lexam. Although the similar design of an underbone motorcycle, it has a CVT transmission and therefore has no gears for the rider to select, similar to scooters.

== Origins ==
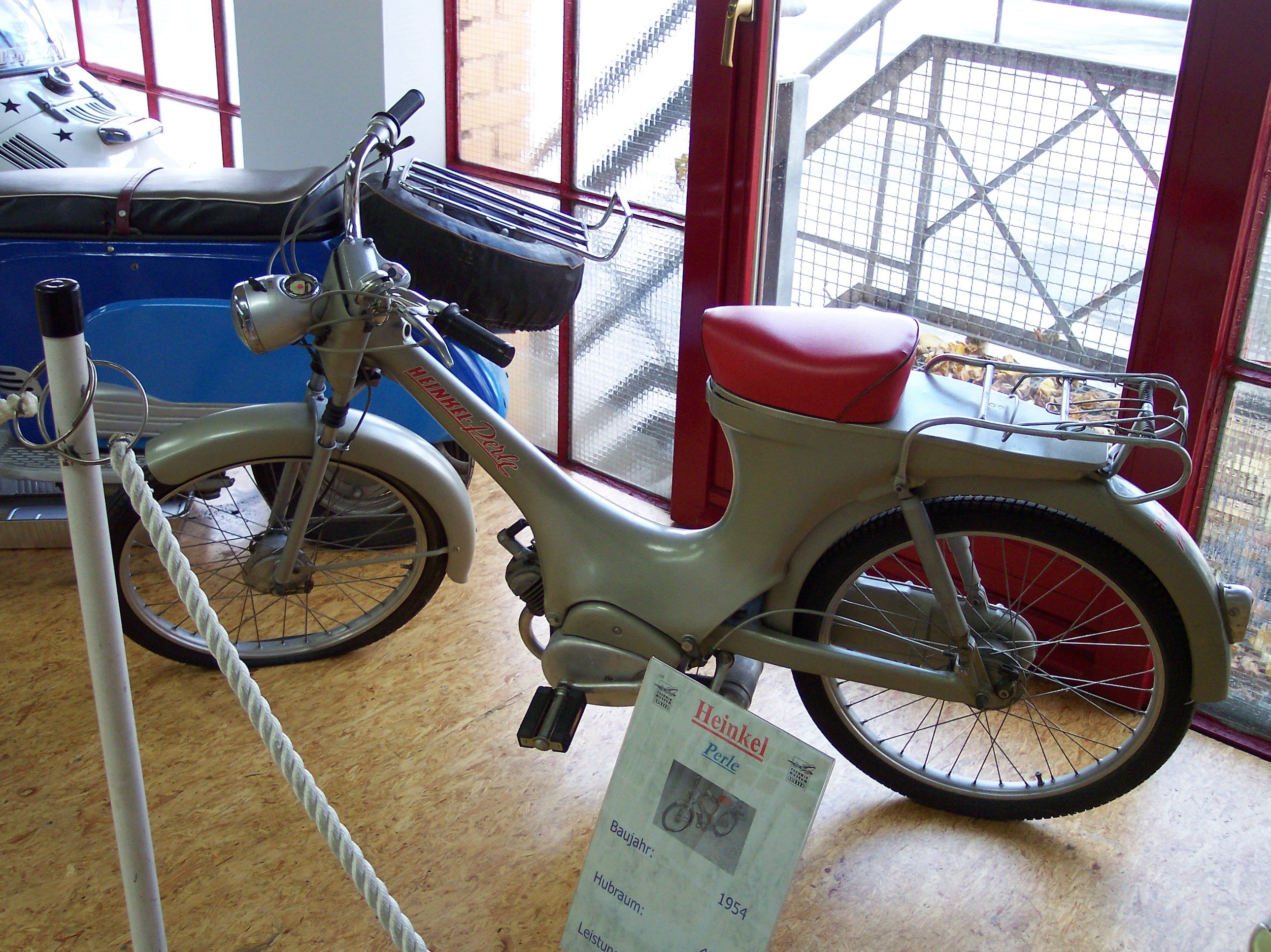
The Heinkel Perle was introduced in 1954, four years before the Honda Super Cub

The underbone concept can be seen in some of the European mopeds of the early 1950s, including the NSU Quickly and the Heinkel Perle. The spine-framed, plastic-faired Honda Super Cub is the most produced motor vehicle of all time. Production of the Super Cub began in 1958, surpassing 60 million units in April 2008, and continuing to be made in several countries around the world as of 2012.

== Other names and derivations ==
In Malaysia and Singapore this vehicle is commonly known as Kapcai or Kapchai, a slang word derived from Cantonese, being a combination of the word "Cub" from the word Honda Cub and "仔" in Chinese. In Cantonese, "仔" (pronounced "jai", or in pinyin "zai") means "little" (or its derivatives, e.g. "small", "mini", etc.). Therefore,"kapchai" literally means a "Little Cub". With Honda being a very popular brand in Malaysia, all underbone motorbikes have come to be called "kapchai". In Indonesia, it is called "motor bebek" (literally means "duck bike"). In Greece this is known as Papi or Papaki, a slang term that can also mean duck.

A variation on the underbone concept known as the "maxi-scooter" or "touring scooter" is popular in western Europe. These are much larger than the underbones known to the Asian market and vary in size from the early Honda Helix with 250 cc to the 850 cc Gilera GP800. Many current versions are between 400 cc and 650 cc, including the Honda Silver Wing with 582 cc, the Suzuki Burgman with 400 cc or 638 cc, the Yamaha Majesty 400 with 395 cc, and the Yamaha T-Max 500 with 499 cc.

Underbones of conventional size are popular in Western Europe and marketed alongside conventional scooters. They are sometimes referred to as scooters, despite the design difference between underbones and conventional scooters.

In Southeast Asia, some manual underbone bikes are designed by cover body without side wings, full-length front shock, and sport bike look headlamp. It look more sporty and better performance than the cub underbones. For example, Suzuki Raider R150, Honda Nova series, Suzuki Akira/Stinger, Yamaha MX Speed, Cagiva Stella, and many more. In Indonesia, this type of bike are called "ayago" (ayam jago means rooster)

== Storage ==
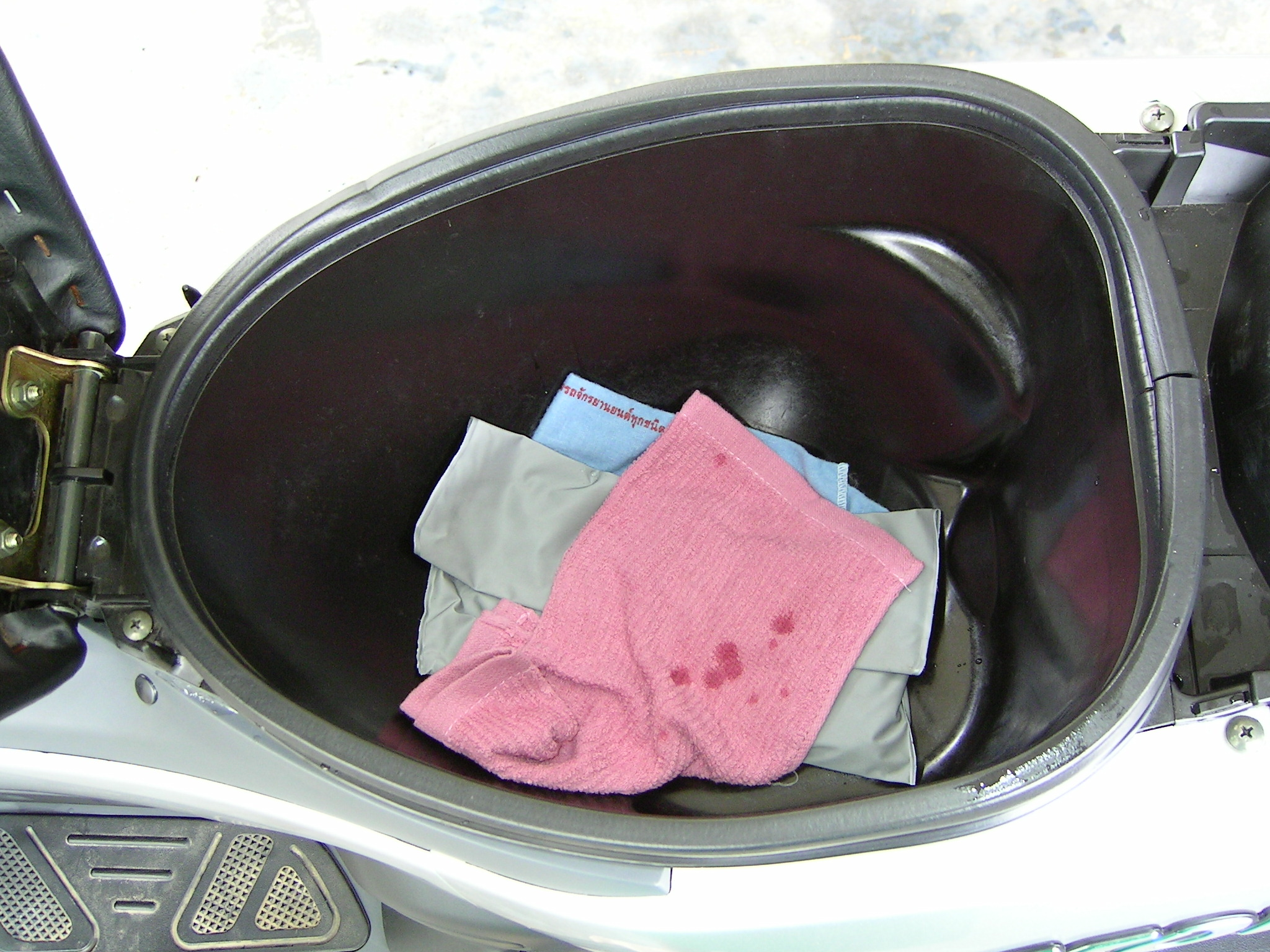
Yamaha Nouvo's helmet storage compartment.

Underbone motorcycles often come with storage, and this may vary between markets. In Southeast Asia, there is commonly a steel basket provided as there is none under the seat, as this is the placement of the fuel tank. Some underbones have a lockable storage compartment under the seat. Some have a hook in the area between the rider's knees for a shopping bag. Another storage capacity may be provided in a top box, detachable in some cases.

== Manufacturers ==
The market for underbone motorcycles is dominated by Japanese manufacturers, though many of them are built in factories elsewhere, including China and Taiwan. In other cases, manufacturers have violated copyright and illegally copied the models of Japanese manufacturers. The Honda Cub, Honda Wave series, and Yamaha Lagenda series are amongst the most copied.

MZ Motorrad currently produces underbone models in Malaysia by their main shareholder, Hong Leong Group which is also the sole distributor of Yamaha motorcycle in Malaysia and Singapore. Mforce Bikes Holdings Sdn Bhd also producing an underbone motorcycle under Benelli Motorcycle.

The major underbone manufacturers are as follows:

- China: Haojue, Zongshen, Lifan, KAMAX.
- Malaysia: Modenas, Momos Motor (rebadge of Cagiva), Naza Bikers (rebadge of Zongshen), Demak and Mforce Bikes Holdings.
- Germany: MZ Motorrad
- India: TVS Motors (underbone versions are available in India, Indonesia and the Philippines)
- Indonesia: Kanzen, Binter (rebadge of Kawasaki), Viar
- Italy: Cagiva, Piaggio, Benelli
- Japan: Honda, Yamaha, Suzuki, Kawasaki
- Philippines: LuckyStar Motorcycles, MCX Motor (Phils.), Blaze Motortech, Sunriser, RUSI,
- South Korea: Daelim Motor Company
- Taiwan: Kymco, SYM Motors
- Thailand: Tiger Motor Co. Ltd
- Mexico: Italika

== Culture ==
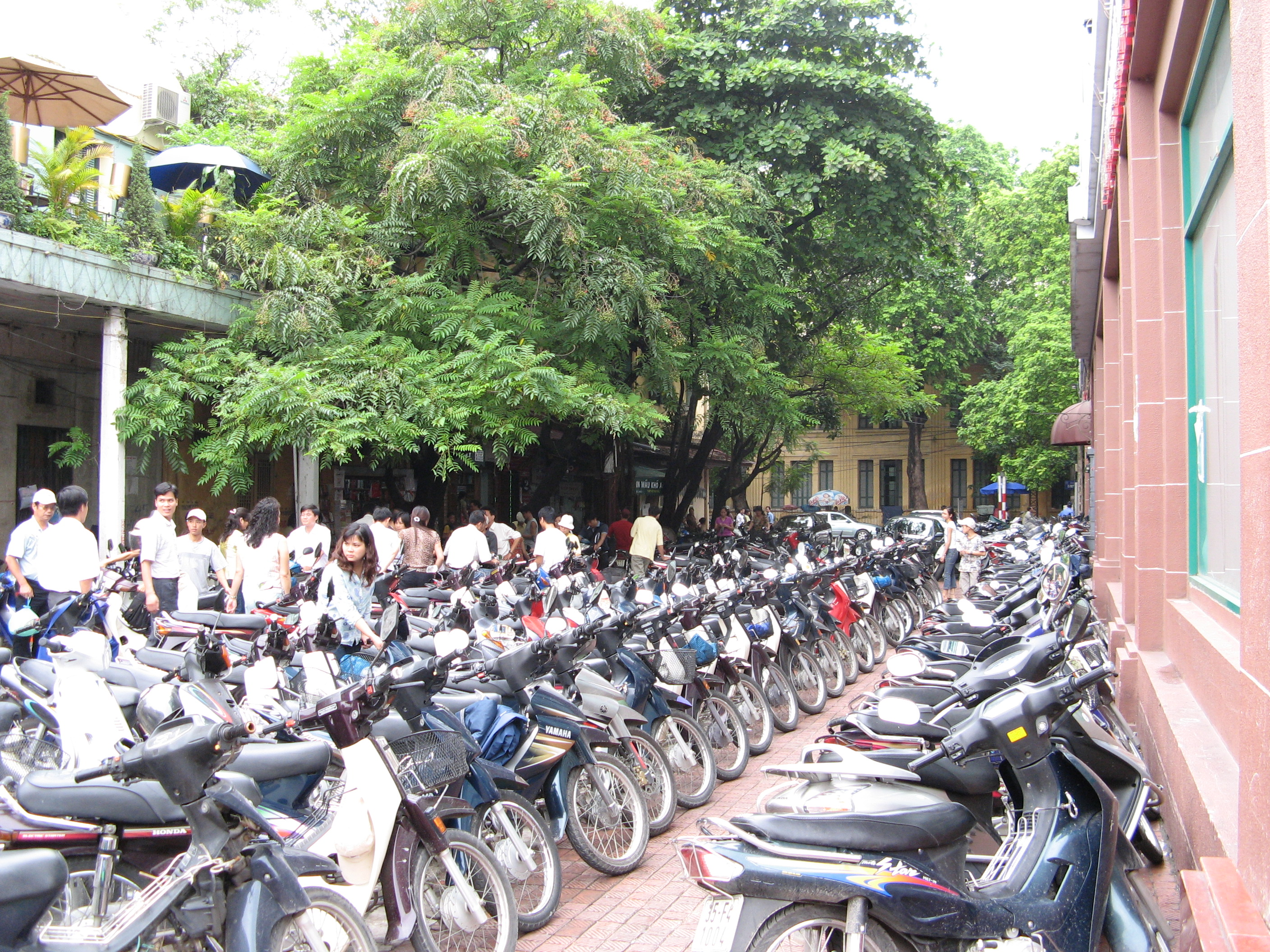
Underbones parked in Hanoi

Underbones are very popular in Southeast Asia and Greece. There is a demand for aftermarket and tuner parts. Many enthusiasts modify their underbones either for a show (such as installing small sound systems, neon lights and custom paint jobs) or for performance (like increasing the engine power and fine-tuning the suspension). Riding gear may not even extend to wearing shoes and long pants for safety. Illegal underbone drag racing has become popular in countries such as the Philippines, Malaysia, Thailand, Indonesia and Greece, and poses safety issues for the commuting public as well as the riders themselves, as underbones offer little protection in the event of crashes. The most popular underbone for these purposes is the Honda XRM, Suzuki Raider 150 and the Honda Wave, although similar models from Kawasaki and Yamaha are also frequently used.

In Singapore and Malaysia, it is not uncommon to see old bicycles customized with parts found on an underbone motorcycle, a growing trend popular with the youth.

=== Racing ===
Underbone motorcycle racing are one of the most popular motorcycle racing class in the Southeastern Asia region, which uses a modified version of road-legal, production-based underbone motorcycle available for purchase in public, mostly manufactured by Yamaha, Honda, and Suzuki. Underbone racing popularity is mostly influenced by their wide variety of racing classes, race track limitations, and fairly cheaper cost of parts and development compared to sport motorcycle classes. Underbone racing class may be further categorized into the engine cycle, engine displacement, engine layout, fuel delivery systems, allowable modifications and restrictions, time brackets (in drag racing), and the rider's skill level. These categories are then regulated by the country's motorcycle racing governing body, from which national racing series may be organized. One of the most popular categories is the 150cc four-stroke fuel-injected class and may have engine power output ranging from 24 to 32 horsepower and can reach up to 180 km/h. Most of the motorcycle competing in this class are Yamaha T-150, Honda RS150R, Voge FR150 and Suzuki Raider 150.

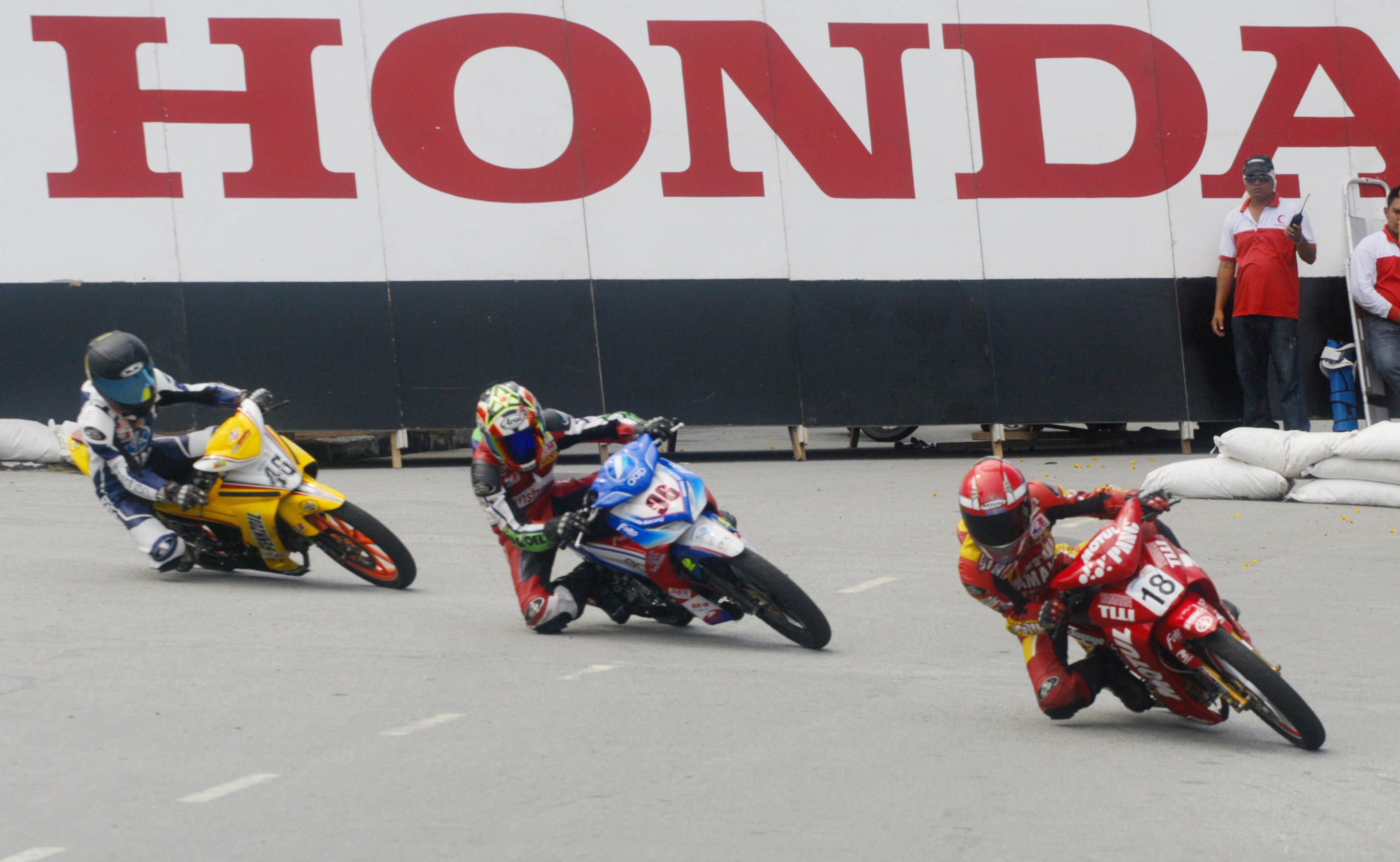
Malaysian Cub Prix

Notable underbone road racing series in Southeast Asia countries are Malaysian Cub Prix and Indonesian Oneprix and MotoPrix Series. The highest level for underbone road racing class is held by Asia Road Racing Championship under UB150 class, from which only production underbone motorcycle with a maximum of 150cc engine displacement may compete in this class, hence the name. Only Yamaha and Honda motorcycles compete in this class with teams from various Asian countries.

Underbone racing series in lower divisions in each country may also be organized to encourage new teams and riders to develop and prepare for the national racing series. In Malaysia, the underbone racing series was created in partnership with the government of Malaysia's Ministry of Youth and Culture in 2012 to encourage youth to race in a controlled track environment rather than on the streets. It was designed to have a lower cost of entry than existing underbone series, such as the Malaysian Cub Prix.
