= List of rider deaths in motorcycle racing =

This article lists motorcycle riders who have died competing at motorcycle racing events. This article lists rider deaths in all series, at any level.

== Isle of Man TT, Manx Grand Prix and Southern 100 ==
There have been over 275 recorded competitor deaths in the Isle of Man since 1910. Some Isle of Man deaths are included directly below, as the races carried World Championship status until a British Grand Prix was established on short-circuits from 1977.

== MotoGP/Grand Prix motorcycle racing World Championship ==
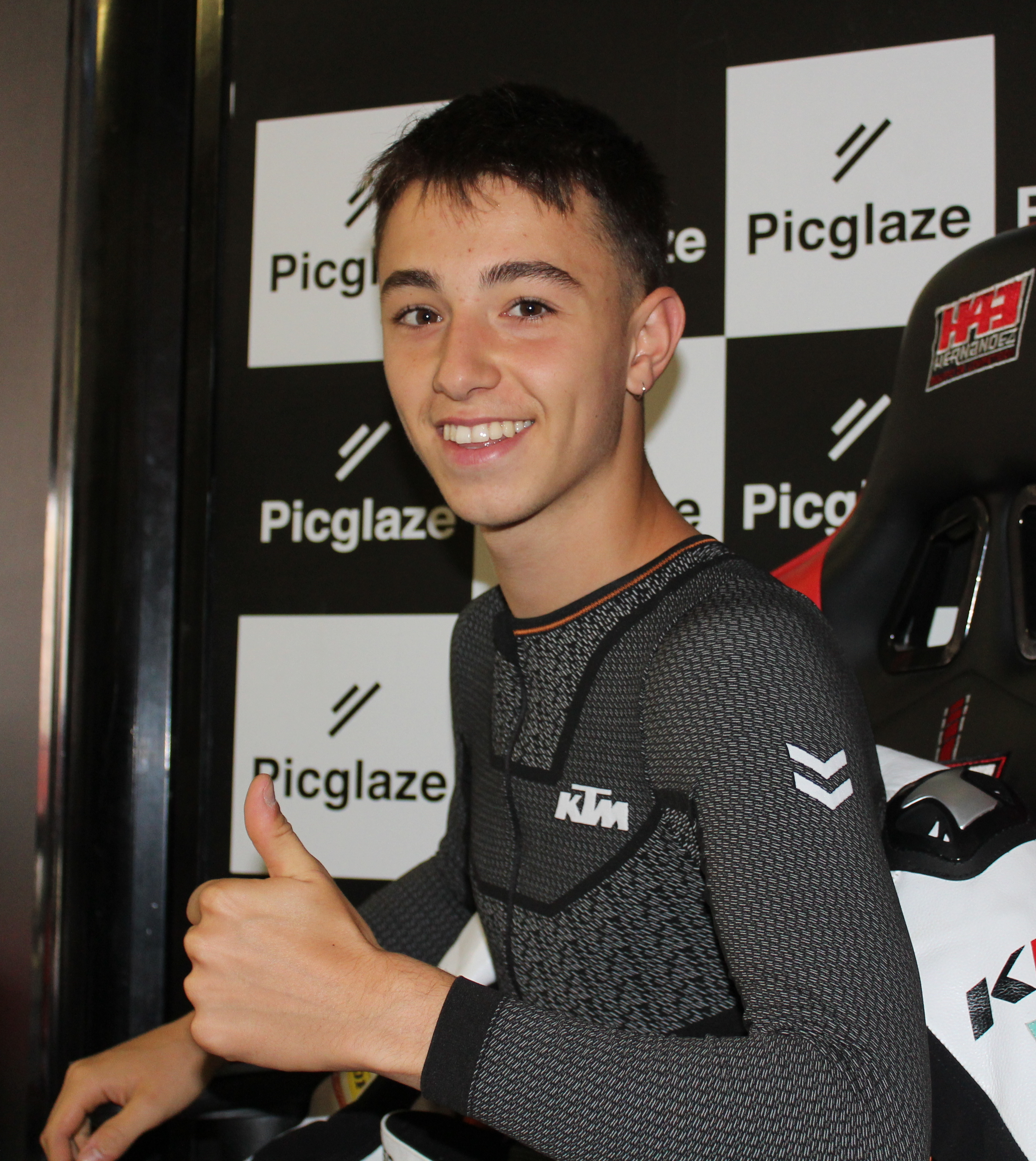
Jason Dupasquier is the most recent rider to be fatally injured during a Grand Prix motorcycle racing event.

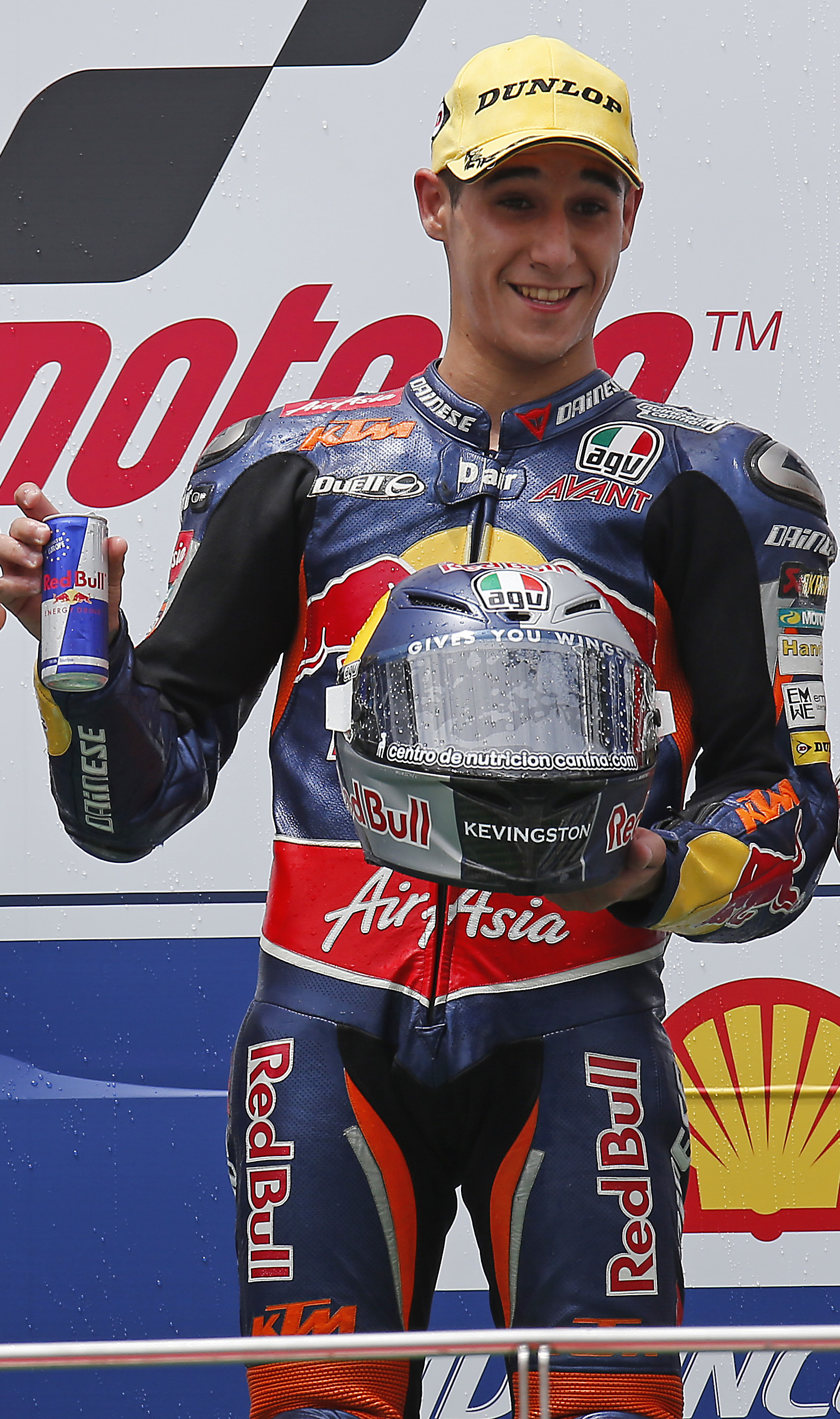
Luis Salom is the most recent rider to be fatally injured during a home Grand Prix motorcycle racing event.

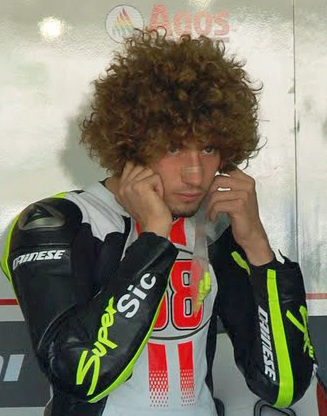
Marco Simoncelli is the most recent 500 cc/MotoGP class rider (and most recent former champion) to be fatally injured during a Grand Prix motorcycle racing event and the most recent during a race session.

Listed are fatalities of riders in the Grand Prix motorcycle racing World Championship races since its foundation in 1949. In total, 104 riders have died from incidents that occurred at Grand Prix motorcycle racing events, with Ben Drinkwater being the first in 1949. Three riders died in the 1940s; twenty-nine in the 1950s; twenty-seven in the 1960s; twenty-four in the 1970s; fourteen in the 1980s; two in the 1990s; one in the 2000s; three in the 2010s; and one in the 2020s. Twenty-six of the fatalities occurred on permanent circuits; seventy-eight fatalities took place on street circuits, with 36 fatalities at the Isle of Man TT, which was removed from the championship after 1976. The most recent fatal accident occurred in May 2021 when Jason Dupasquier was killed after a crash during qualifying at the Italian Grand Prix, while the most recent fatal accident to occur in the 500 cc/MotoGP class happened in October 2011, when Marco Simoncelli was killed after he was struck by Valentino Rossi and Colin Edwards during the Malaysian Grand Prix.

Eight Grand Prix motorcycle racing champions have died while racing or practicing in Grand Prix motorcycle racing: Dario Ambrosini in 1951, Leslie Graham in 1953, Rupert Hollaus in 1954, Tom Phillis in 1962, Bill Ivy in 1969, Jarno Saarinen in 1973, Daijiro Kato in 2003, and Marco Simoncelli in 2011. Rupert Hollaus' 1954 title was the only time a posthumous World Champion was crowned in any class in Grand Prix motorcycle racing. He was killed during practice for the Italian Grand Prix before the end of the 1954 season.

Rider	Date of accident	Race	Class	Circuit	Bike	During	Ref
Ben Drinkwater (UK)	June 9, 1949	1949 Isle of Man TT	350 cc	Isle of Man TT Mountain Course	Norton	Race	
Edouard Bruylant (BEL)	July 17, 1949	1949 Belgian Grand Prix	Sidecar	Circuit de Spa-Francorchamps	Norton	Race	
"Hurst" (UK) (Note: "Hurst" was racing under a nom de course, and his full name was not released publicly at the time of his death. Archives of the municipality of Francorchamps indicate that his full name was Keeth Hurst, although Keeth may have been a misspelling of Keith.)	July 17, 1949	1949 Belgian Grand Prix	Sidecar	Circuit de Spa-Francorchamps	Norton	Race	
David Whitworth (UK)	July 2, 1950	1950 Belgian Grand Prix	350 cc	Circuit de Spa-Francorchamps	Velocette	Race	
John O'Driscoll (UK)	May 31, 1951	1951 Isle of Man TT	350 cc	Isle of Man TT Mountain Course	Rudge	Practice	
John Wenman (UK)	June 4, 1951	1951 Isle of Man TT	350 cc	Isle of Man TT Mountain Course	Norton	Race	
Chris Horn (UK)	June 8, 1951	1951 Isle of Man TT	500 cc	Isle of Man TT Mountain Course	Norton	Race	
Dario Ambrosini (ITA)	July 14, 1951	1951 French Grand Prix	250 cc	Circuit d'Albi	Benelli	Practice	
Sante Geminiani (ITA)	August 15, 1951	1951 Ulster Grand Prix	250 cc	Clady Circuit	Moto Guzzi	Practice	
Gianni Leoni (ITA)	August 15, 1951	1951 Ulster Grand Prix	250 cc	Clady Circuit	Moto Guzzi	Practice	
Dave Bennett (UK)	May 18, 1952	1952 Swiss Grand Prix	500 cc	Circuit Bremgarten	Norton	Race	
(Italy) Ercole Frigerio	May 18, 1952	1952 Swiss Grand Prix	Sidecar	Circuit Bremgarten	Gilera	Race	
Frank Fry (UK)	June 4, 1952	1952 Isle of Man TT	500 cc	Isle of Man TT Mountain Course	Norton	Practice	
Norman Stewart (UK)	August 16, 1952	1952 Ulster Grand Prix	350 cc	Clady Circuit	Norton	Race	
Harry Stephen (UK)	June 8, 1953	1953 Isle of Man TT	350 cc	Isle of Man TT Mountain Course	Norton	Race	
Thomas Swarbrick (UK)	June 8, 1953	1953 Isle of Man TT	350 cc	Isle of Man TT Mountain Course	AJS	Race	
Leslie Graham (UK)	June 12, 1953	1953 Isle of Man TT	500 cc	Isle of Man TT Mountain Course	MV Agusta	Race	
Geoffrey Walker (AUS)	June 12, 1953	1953 Isle of Man TT	500 cc	Isle of Man TT Mountain Course	Norton	Race	
Ernie Ring (AUS)	July 5, 1953	1953 Belgian Grand Prix	500 cc	Circuit de Spa-Francorchamps	AJS	Race	
Simon Sandys-Winsch (UK)	June 18, 1954	1954 Isle of Man TT	500 cc	Isle of Man TT Mountain Course	Velocette	Race	
Gordon Laing (UK)	July 4, 1954	1954 Belgian Grand Prix	350 cc	Circuit de Spa-Francorchamps	Norton	Race	
Dennis Lashmar (UK)	July 25, 1954	1954 German Grand Prix	500 cc	Solitudering	BSA	Race	
Rupert Hollaus (AUT)	September 11, 1954	1954 Nations Grand Prix	125 cc	Autodromo Nazionale Monza	NSU	Practice	
Ricardo Galvagni (ARG)	June 25, 1955	1955 German Grand Prix	500 cc	Nürburgring	Norton	Practice	
Julian Crossley (UK)	August 11, 1955	1955 Ulster Grand Prix	350 cc	Dundrod Circuit	Norton	Race	
Derek Ennett (IOM)	August 9, 1956	1956 Ulster Grand Prix	350 cc	Dundrod Circuit	Moto Guzzi	Race	
Charlie Salt (UK)	June 7, 1957	1957 Isle of Man TT	500 cc	Isle of Man TT Mountain Course	BSA	Race	
(East Germany) Josef Knebel{	June 28, 1957	1957 Dutch TT	Sidecar	TT Circuit Assen	BMW	Practice	
Roberto Colombo (ITA)	July 6, 1957	1957 Belgian Grand Prix	350 cc	Circuit de Spa-Francorchamps	MV Agusta	Practice	
John Antram (NZ)	May 26, 1958	1958 Isle of Man TT		Isle of Man TT Mountain Course	AJS	Practice	
Des Wolff (RHO)	June 6, 1958	1958 Isle of Man TT	500 cc	Isle of Man TT Mountain Course	Norton	Race	
(Italy) Adolfo Covi	September 6, 1959	1959 Nations Grand Prix	500 cc	Autodromo Nazionale Monza	Norton	Race	
Peter Ferbrache (UK)	June 25, 1960	1960 Dutch TT	350 cc	TT Circuit Assen	AJS	Race	
Bob Brown (AUS)	July 24, 1960	1960 German Grand Prix	250 cc	Solitudering	Honda	Practice	
Mike Brookes (UK)	June 10, 1961	1961 Isle of Man TT	500 cc	Isle of Man TT Mountain Course	Norton	Practice	
Marie Lambert (CH)	June 12, 1961	1961 Isle of Man TT	Sidecar	Isle of Man TT Mountain Course	BMW	Race	
Ralph Rensen (UK)	June 16, 1961	1961 Isle of Man TT	500 cc	Isle of Man TT Mountain Course	Norton	Race	
Ron Miles (AUS)	August 9, 1961	1961 Ulster Grand Prix	350 cc	Dundrod Circuit	Norton	Practice	
Tom Phillis (AUS)	June 6, 1962	1962 Isle of Man TT	350 cc	Isle of Man TT Mountain Course	Honda	Race	
Colin Meehan (NZ)	June 6, 1962	1962 Isle of Man TT	350 cc	Isle of Man TT Mountain Course	AJS	Race	
Hans Schuld (NED)	June 29, 1962	1962 Dutch TT	250 cc	TT Circuit Assen	NSU	Practice	
Marcelin Herranz (FRA)	June 1, 1963	1963 French Grand Prix	250 cc	Charade Circuit	Moto Morini	Practice	
Brian Cockrell (UK)	June 2, 1964	1964 Isle of Man TT	Sidecar	Isle of Man TT Mountain Course	Norton	Practice	
Peter Essery (UK)	June 8, 1964	1964 Isle of Man TT	Sidecar	Isle of Man TT Mountain Course	Matchless	Race	
Roland Föll (GER)	June 26, 1964	1964 Dutch TT	125 cc	TT Circuit Assen	Honda	Practice	
(East Germany) Karl Recktenwald	July 19, 1964	1964 German Grand Prix	500 cc	Solitudering	Norton	Race	
Vernon Cottle (UK)	August 29, 1964	1964 Finnish Grand Prix	350 cc	Imatra Circuit	AJS	Race	
Norman Huntingford (UK)	June 25, 1966	1966 Dutch TT	Sidecar	TT Circuit Assen	Matchless	Race	
(Japan) Toshio Fujii	August 26, 1966	1966 Isle of Man TT	125 cc	Isle of Man TT Mountain Course	Kawasaki	Practice	
Brian Duffy (UK)	August 28, 1966	1966 Isle of Man TT	250 cc	Isle of Man TT Mountain Course	Yamaha	Race	
Alfred Shaw (UK)	June 10, 1967	1967 Isle of Man TT	500 cc	Isle of Man TT Mountain Course	Norton	Practice	
Werner Daubitz (DDR)	July 16, 1967	1967 East German Grand Prix		Sachsenring	MZ	Practice	
Ian Veitch (NZ)	June 10, 1968	1968 Isle of Man TT	250 cc	Isle of Man TT Mountain Course	Kawasaki	Race	
(West Germany) Johann Attenberger	July 7, 1968	1968 Belgian Grand Prix	Sidecar	Circuit de Spa-Francorchamps	BMW	Race	
Josef Schillinger (GER)	July 7, 1968	1968 Belgian Grand Prix	Sidecar	Circuit de Spa-Francorchamps	BMW	Race	
Rolf Schmid (GER)	October 13, 1968	1968 Hockenheim Grand Prix (Note: The sidecar race at the 1968 Nations Grand Prix was cancelled and so a replacement race was held alongside the German national championship at the Hockenheimring in October.)	Sidecar	Hockenheimring	BMW	Race	
Arthur Lavington (UK)	June 6, 1969	1969 Isle of Man TT	350 cc	Isle of Man TT Mountain Course	Velocette	Practice	
Bill Ivy (UK)	July 12, 1969	1969 East German Grand Prix	350 cc	Sachsenring	Jawa	Practice	
František Boček (CSK)	July 20, 1969	1969 Czechoslovak Grand Prix	350 cc	Brno Circuit	Jawa	Race	
Robin Fitton (UK)	May 2, 1970	1970 German Grand Prix	350 cc	Nürburgring	Norton	Practice	
Les Iles (UK)	June 1, 1970	1970 Isle of Man TT	125 cc	Isle of Man TT Mountain Course	Bultaco	Practice	
Michael Collins (UK)	June 3, 1970	1970 Isle of Man TT	500 cc	Isle of Man TT Mountain Course	Seeley	Practice	
Dennis Blower (UK)	June 3, 1970	1970 Isle of Man TT	Sidecar	Isle of Man TT Mountain Course	BSA	Practice	
Santiago Herrero (ESP)	June 8, 1970	1970 Isle of Man TT	250 cc	Isle of Man TT Mountain Course	Ossa	Race	
John Wetherall (MLT)	June 12, 1970	1970 Isle of Man TT	500 cc	Isle of Man TT Mountain Course	Norton	Race	
Brian Steenson (UK)	June 12, 1970	1970 Isle of Man TT	500 cc	Isle of Man TT Mountain Course	Seeley	Race	
Maurice Jeffery (UK)	June 12, 1971	1971 Isle of Man TT	500 cc	Isle of Man TT Mountain Course	Norton	Race	
Christian Ravel (FRA)	July 4, 1971	1971 Belgian Grand Prix	500 cc	Circuit de Spa-Francorchamps	Kawasaki	Race	
(East Germany) Günter Bartusch	July 8, 1971	1971 East German Grand Prix	350 cc	Sachsenring	MZ	Practice	
Gilberto Parlotti (ITA)	June 9, 1972	1972 Isle of Man TT	125 cc	Isle of Man TT Mountain Course	Morbidelli	Race	
Hans-Jürgen Cusnik (GER)	July 16, 1972	1972 Czechoslovak Grand Prix	Sidecar	Brno Circuit	BMW	Race	
Renzo Pasolini (ITA)	May 20, 1973	1973 Nations Grand Prix	250 cc	Autodromo Nazionale Monza	Harley-Davidson	Race	
Jarno Saarinen (FIN)	May 20, 1973	1973 Nations Grand Prix	250 cc	Autodromo Nazionale Monza	Yamaha	Race	
Billie Nelson (UK)	September 8, 1974	1974 Yugoslavian Grand Prix	250 cc	Opatija Circuit	Yamaha	Race	
Phil Gurner (UK)	June 4, 1975	1975 Isle of Man TT	500 cc	Isle of Man TT Mountain Course	Yamaha	Race	
(West Germany) Rolf Thiele	June 28, 1975	1975 Dutch TT	250 cc	TT Circuit Assen	Yamaha	Race	
(Italy) Paolo Tordi	May 16, 1976	1976 Nations Grand Prix	350 cc	Mugello Circuit	Yamaha	Race	
Otello Buscherini (ITA)	May 16, 1976	1976 Nations Grand Prix	250 cc	Mugello Circuit	Yamaha	Race	
Walter Wörner (GER)	June 7, 1976	1976 Isle of Man TT	Sidecar	Isle of Man TT Mountain Course	Yamaha	Race	
Les Kenny (AUS)	June 12, 1976	1976 Isle of Man TT	250 cc	Isle of Man TT Mountain Course	Yamaha	Race	
Hans Stadelmann (CH)	May 1, 1977	1977 Austrian Grand Prix	350 cc	Salzburgring	Yamaha	Race	
(Italy) Giovanni Ziggiotto	June 18, 1977	1977 Yugoslavian Grand Prix	250 cc	Opatija Circuit	Yamaha	Practice	
Ulrich Graf (CH)	June 19, 1977	1977 Yugoslavian Grand Prix	50 cc	Opatija Circuit	Kreidler	Race	
Patrick Pons (FRA)	August 10, 1980	1980 British Grand Prix	500 cc	Silverstone Circuit	Yamaha	Race	
Malcolm White (UK)	August 10, 1980	1980 British Grand Prix	Sidecar	Silverstone Circuit	Yamaha	Race	
Michel Rougerie (FRA)	May 31, 1981	1981 Yugoslavian Grand Prix	350 cc	Automotodrom Grobnik	Chevallier	Race	
(Italy) Sauro Pazzaglia (Note: Pazzaglia died on July 14, 1981, three days after his accident.)	July 11, 1981	1981 San Marino Grand Prix	250 cc	Autodromo Enzo e Dino Ferrari	MBA	Practice	
(France) Alain Béraud	August 30, 1981	1981 Czechoslovak Grand Prix	250 cc	Brno Circuit	Yamaha	Race	
Jock Taylor (UK)	August 15, 1982	1982 Finnish Grand Prix	Sidecar	Imatra Circuit	Windle	Race	
(Japan) Iwao Ishikawa	March 29, 1983	1983 French Grand Prix	500 cc	Bugatti Circuit	Suzuki	Practice	
Michel Frutschi (CH)	April 3, 1983	1983 French Grand Prix	500 cc	Bugatti Circuit	Honda	Race	
Rolf Rüttimann (CH)	June 12, 1983	1983 Yugoslavian Grand Prix	125 cc	Automotodrom Grobnik	MBA	Race	
Norman Brown (UK)	July 31, 1983	1983 British Grand Prix	500 cc	Silverstone Circuit	Suzuki	Race	
Peter Huber (CH)	July 31, 1983	1983 British Grand Prix	500 cc	Silverstone Circuit	Suzuki	Race	
Kevin Wrettom (UK)	July 7, 1984	1984 Belgian Grand Prix	500 cc	Circuit de Spa-Francorchamps	Suzuki	Practice	
Alfred Heck (GER)	July 21, 1988	1988 French Grand Prix	Sidecar	Circuit Paul Ricard	LCR	Practice	
Iván Palazzese (VEN)	May 28, 1989	1989 German Grand Prix	250 cc	Hockenheimring	Aprilia	Race	
(Japan) Nobuyuki Wakai	May 1, 1993	1993 Spanish Grand Prix	250 cc	Circuito de Jerez	Suzuki	Practice	
Simon Prior (UK) (Note: Prior died on June 30, 1994, two weeks and four days after his accident.)	June 12, 1994	1994 German Grand Prix	Sidecar	Hockenheimring	LCR	Race	
Daijiro Kato (JPN) (Note: Kato died on April 20, 2003, two weeks after his accident.)	April 6, 2003	2003 Japanese Grand Prix	MotoGP	Suzuka Circuit	Honda	Race	
Shoya Tomizawa (JPN)	September 5, 2010	2010 San Marino and Rimini Grand Prix	Moto2	Misano Circuit	Suter	Race	
Marco Simoncelli (ITA)	October 23, 2011	2011 Malaysian Grand Prix	MotoGP	Sepang International Circuit	Honda	Race	
Luis Salom (ESP)	June 3, 2016	2016 Catalan Grand Prix	Moto2	Circuit de Barcelona-Catalunya	Kalex	Practice	
Jason Dupasquier (CH) (Note: Dupasquier died on May 30, 2021, one day after his accident.)	May 29, 2021	2021 Italian Grand Prix	Moto3	Mugello Circuit	KTM	Qualifying	

Footnotes

=== By circuit ===
Circuit	Total	First	Last
(United Kingdom) Isle of Man TT Mountain Course	36	1949	1976
(Belgium) Circuit de Spa-Francorchamps	10	1949	1984
(Netherlands) TT Circuit Assen	6	1957	1975
(Italy) Autodromo Nazionale Monza	4	1954	1973
(United Kingdom) Silverstone Circuit	4	1980	1983
(United Kingdom) Clady Circuit	3	1951	1952
(Germany) Solitudering	3	1954	1964
(United Kingdom) Dundrod Circuit	3	1955	1961
(Czech Republic) Brno Circuit	3	1969	1981
(Germany) Hockenheimring	3	1968	1994
(Germany) Sachsenring	3	1967	1971
(Socialist Federal Republic of Yugoslavia) Opatija Circuit	3	1974	1977
(Italy) Mugello Circuit	3	1976	2021
(Switzerland) Circuit Bremgarten	2	1952	1952
(Germany) Nürburgring	2	1955	1970
(Finland) Imatra Circuit	2	1964	1982
(Socialist Federal Republic of Yugoslavia) Automotodrom Grobnik	2	1981	1983
(France) Bugatti Circuit	2	1983	1983
(France) Circuit d'Albi	1	1951	1951
(France) Charade Circuit	1	1963	1963
(Austria) Salzburgring	1	1977	1977
(Italy) Autodromo Enzo e Dino Ferrari	1	1981	1981
(France) Circuit Paul Ricard	1	1988	1988
(Spain) Circuito de Jerez	1	1993	1993
(Japan) Suzuka Circuit	1	2003	2003
(Italy) Misano Circuit	1	2010	2010
(Malaysia) Sepang International Circuit	1	2011	2011
(Spain) Circuit de Barcelona-Catalunya	1	2016	2016

=== By decade ===
Decade	Total
1940s	3
1950s	29
1960s	27
1970s	24
1980s	14
1990s	2
2000s	1
2010s	3
2020s	1
Total	104

== Grand Prix class racing ==
Year	Rider	Circuit	Series	Ref
1925	(United Kingdom) Bill Hollowell	Spa-Francorchamps	Non-Championship GP	
1926	(Italy) Gino Galli	Monza	Non-Championship GP	
1926	(Italy) Giacomo Basso	Ostiense	Italian Motorcycle Racing Championship	
1926	(Italy) Gino Galli	Monza	Italian Motorcycle Racing Championship	
1932	(Italy) Bruno Quaglieni	Spa-Francorchamps	Non-Championship GP	
1932	(Germany) Robby Jecker	Spa-Francorchamps	Non-Championship GP	
1933	(Norway) Harry Bjelkerud	Saxtorp	Non-Championship GP	
1933	(Sweden) Eric Lundberg	Saxtorp	Non-Championship GP	
1934	(Sweden) Gunnar Kalén	Sachsenring	Non-Championship GP	
1934	(Belgium) Erik "Noir" Haps	Sachsenring	Non-Championship GP	
1934	(Belgium) Pol Demeuter	Sachsenring	Non-Championship GP	
1934	(Netherlands) Arie van der Pluym	Spa-Francorchamps	European Motorcycle Championship - 500cc	
1936	(Belgium) Marcel Preud'Homme	Floreffe	Non-Championship GP	
1937	(United Kingdom) Jimmie Guthrie	Sachsenring	Non-Championship GP	
1938	(Germany) Ernst Lehmann	Sachsenring	European Motorcycle Championship	
1938	(Germany) Hermann Widenmeyer	Sachsenring	European Motorcycle Championship - 500cc	
1947	(Italy) Paolo Altissimi	Posillipo	Italian Motorcycle Racing Championship	
1948	(United Kingdom) Norman Linnecar	Monaco	Non-Championship GP	
1948	(Finland) Gösta Lönnfors	Assen (Van Drenthe Circuit)	Dutch TT - 350cc	
1948	(Italy) Omobono Tenni	Bern	Non-Championship GP	
1950	(Italy) Oscar Clemencich	Ospedaletti	Italian Motorcycle Speed Championship	
1952	(Italy) Libero Borsari	Marghera	Italian Motorcycle Championship	
1956	(Germany) Hans Baltisberger	Brno	Non-Championship GP	
1958	(Germany) Inge Stoll	Brno	Non-Championship Sidecar GP +	
1960	(United Kingdom) Dave Chadwick	Mettet	Mettet International Road Races	
1955	(Federation of Rhodesia and Nyasaland) Ray Amm	Autodromo Dino Ferrari		
1956	(United Kingdom) Fergus Anderson	Floreffe		
1958	(Australia) Keith Campbell	Cadours		
1959	(Australia) Harry Hinton Jr.	Autodromo Dino Ferrari	Italian Motorcycle Speed Championship	
1961	(United Kingdom) Dickie Dale	Nürburgring		
1961	(Italy) Franco Tirri	Monza	Italian Motorcycle Speed Championship	
1972	(Indonesia) John Saksono	Prievidza, Bojnice	Czechoslovak Motorcycle Championship	
1990	(Italy) Eros Manferdini	Rijeka	European Motorcycle Championship - 250cc	
2018	(Spain) Andreas Pérez	Catalunya	CEV Moto3 Junior World Championship	
2021	(Spain) Hugo Millán	MotorLand Aragón	European Talent Cup	
2025	(Spain) Pau Alsina	MotorLand Aragón	JuniorGP	

== Endurance Series ==
Year	Rider	Circuit	Race	Ref
1936	(France) René Bourra	Saint-Germain-en-Laye	Bol d'Or	
1959	(Spain) Conrado Cadirat	Montjuïc	24 Horas de Montjuïc	
1966	(Spain) Pedro Bernaus	Montjuïc	24 Horas de Montjuïc	
1970	(Netherlands) Franz Huber	Circuit Maashaven	24 Hours of Oss	
1970	(United Kingdom) Gerald Bunting	Montjuïc	24 Horas de Montjuïc	
1970	(Germany) Peter Strauss	Montjuïc	24 Horas de Montjuïc	
1970	(Japan) Satoru Takashima	Suzuka	Suzuka 10 Hours Production	
1971	(Belgium) Herman Hertsens	Circuit Maashaven	24 Hours of Oss	
1971	(Netherlands) Lambert Schuurmans	Circuit Maashaven	24 Hours of Oss	
1972	(Belgium) Claude Romain	Zolder	24 Hours of Liège	
1973	(Spain) Francisco Cufí	Montjuïc	24 Horas de Montjuïc	
1975	(Netherlands) Hans Hutten	Circuit Maashaven	24 Hours of Oss	
1976	(Brazil) Francisco Teixeira	Interlagos	24 Horas de Interlagos	
1976	(France) Gilbert Lavelle	Bugatti	Bol d'Or	
1983	(Japan) Kunio Katsumata	Suzuka	Suzuka 8 Hours	
1985	(France) Dominique Litaudon	Bugatti	24 Hours of Le Mans	
1985	(Germany) Nickolaus Ruck	Montjuïc	24 Horas de Montjuïc	
1985	(France) Jean-Pierre Haemisch	Spa-Francorchamps	24 Hours of Liège	
1985	(Germany) Harald Layher	Spa-Francorchamps	24 Hours of Liège	
1986	(Germany) Erwin Loichinger	Hockenheim	1000 km Hockenheim	
1986	(Spain) Domingo Parés	Montjuïc	24 Horas de Montjuïc	
1990	(France) Jean-Michel Besozzi	Paul Ricard	Bol d'Or	
1990	(Germany) Horst Lotz	Paul Ricard	Bol d'Or	
1991	(Canada) Steve Caya	Road Atlanta	WERA 6 Hours	
1996	(United Kingdom) Lee Pullan	Spa-Francorchamps	24 Hours of Liège	
1999	(Belgium) Luc Van Haver	Spa-Francorchamps	24 Hours of Liège	
1999	(Japan) Tadashi Oshima	Motegi	Motegi 7 Hours	
2000	(Spain) Salvador Ferrando	Catalunya	24 Horas de Catalunya	
2000	(Japan) Mamoru Yamakawa	Suzuka	Suzuka 8 Hours	
2001	(Switzerland) Herbert Graf	Magny-Cours	Bol d'Or	
2005	(France) Xavier Fabra	Catalunya	24 Horas de Catalunya	
2007	(Germany) Holger Turni	Hockenheim	ADAC 1000 km Hockenheim	
2007	(Spain) Carlos Vargas	Catalunya	24 Horas de Catalunya	
2008	(Belgium) Adrien Nicolas	Spa-Francorchamps	Spa 8 Hours	
2017	(France) Anthony Delhalle	Nogaro	Tests	
2017	(Spain) Enric Sauri	Catalunya	24 Horas de Catalunya	
2018	(Denmark) Julie Brøndum Mortensen	Hockenheim	1000 km Hockenheim	

== Sidecar World Championship ==
The following riders have been killed in the Sidecar World Championship

Year	Rider	Circuit	Ref
2013	(Germany) Sandor Pohl	TT Circuit Assen	

== Superbike World Championship ==
The following riders have been killed in the Superbike World Championship

Year	Rider	Circuit	Ref
1995	(Japan) Yasutomo Nagai	Assen	
1997	(United Kingdom) Graeme Ritchie	Brands Hatch	

== Supersport World Championship ==
The following riders have been killed in the Supersport World Championship

Year	Rider	Circuit	Ref
1998	(Belgium) Michaël Paquay	Monza	
1999	(South Africa) Brett MacLeod	Kyalami	
2008	(United Kingdom) Craig Jones	Brands Hatch	
2013	(Italy) Andrea Antonelli	Moscow Raceway	

== Other international events ==
Year	Rider	Circuit	Series	Ref
1973	(New Zealand) Kim Newcombe	Silverstone	Formula 750	
1973	(Hong Kong) Shea Lun Tsang	Guia Circuit	Macau Grand Prix	
1973	(United States) Cal Rayborn	Pukekohe	Marlboro Road Race Series	
1977	(United States) Pat Evans	Imola	Imola 200	
1983	(Italy) Guido Paci	Imola	Imola 200	
1985	(Japan) Kengo Kiyama	Suzuka	200 km Suzuka	
1994	(Japan) Katsuhiro Tottori	Guia Circuit	Macau Grand Prix	
1995	(Switzerland) Marcel Meier	Schleizer Dreieck	ISRA Eurocup	
1997	(France) Jean-Marc Fresc	Brno	ISRA Eurocup	
2000	(Northern Ireland) Joey Dunlop	Tallinn	Kalevi Suursõit	
2004	(Italy) Alessio Perilli	TT Circuit Assen	FIM Superstock 1000 Championship	
2005	(Japan) Keisuke Sato	Suzuka	200 km Suzuka	
2005	(France) Bruno Bonhuil	Guia Circuit	Macau Grand Prix	
2011	(Republic of Ireland) Adrian McFarland	Těrlicko	International Road Racing Championship	
2012	(Australia) Oscar McIntyre	Phillip Island	? (SBK meet)	
2012	(Portugal) Luis Carreira	Guia Circuit	Macau Grand Prix	
2014	(Germany) Thilo Häfele	Chimay	International Road Racing Championship	
2014	(Belgium) Vick de Cooremeter	Chimay	International Road Racing Championship	
2017	(Finland) Sammy Ahonen	Hořice	International Road Racing Championship	
2017	(United Kingdom) Daniel Hegarty	Guia Circuit	Macau Grand Prix	
2019	(Switzerland) Mathias Gnägi	Imatra Circuit	International Road Racing Championship	
2021	(Spain) Dean Berta Viñales	Circuito de Jerez	Supersport 300 World Championship	
2022	(Netherlands) Victor Steeman	Algarve International Circuit	Supersport 300 World Championship	
2023	(Netherlands) Joey Den Besten	Imatra Circuit	International Road Racing Championship	
2024	(Italy) Luca Salvadori	Frohburger Dreieck	International Road Racing Championship	

== National Series in Europe ==
Year	Rider	Country	Circuit	Series	Ref				
1934	(Germany) Karl Hess	Germany	Kölner Stadtwald	Westmark Championship					
1952	(West Germany) Horst-Wilhelm Herrmann	Germany	Feldberg	German Street Motorcycle Championship					
1954	(West Germany) Karl Josef Henke	Germany	Hachenburg	ADAC Junior Championship					
1964	(New Zealand) Morrie Low	Germany	Freiburg	German Street Motorcycle Championship					
1965	(Germany) Manfred König	Germany	Nürburgring	ADAC					
1966	(Spain) Francisco Falcet	Spain	Cadiz	Andalusia Championship					
1967	(West Germany) Dietmar Voelmle	Germany	Freiburg - Schauinsland	German Road Race Championship					
1969	(Spain) Pedro Álvarez	Spain	Castellón de la Plana	Spanish Motorcycle Championship					
1970	(Germany) Ulrich Ritkowski	Germany	Nürburgring	German Junior Motorcycle Championship					
1970	(Austria) Roland Frenzl	Austria	Schwanenstadt-Oberndorf	Austrian Motorcycle Championship					
1970	(Austria) Jürgen Walentich	Austria	Schwanenstadt-Oberndorf	Austrian Motorcycle Championship					
1971	(Italy) Angelo Bergamonti	Italy	Riccione	Italian Senior Riders Championship					
1971	(Germany) Herbert Mann	Germany	Nürburgring	German Street Motorcycle Championship					
1972	(Italy) Maurizio Cecere	Italy	Vallelunga	Italian Junior Racers Championship 750 cm3					
1973	(Switzerland) Franz Hullinger	Swiss	Casale Monferrato	Swiss Motorcycle Championship					
1973	(Italy) Carlo Chionio	Italy	Monza	Italian Junior Racers Championship 500 cm3					
1973	(Italy) Renzo Colombini	Italy	Monza	Italian Junior Racers Championship 500 cm3					
1973	(Italy) Renato Galtrucco	Italy	Monza	Italian Junior Racers Championship 500 cm3					
1973	(Italy) Gaetano Bonali	Italy	Vallelunga	Italian Junior Riders Championship 750 cm3					
1975	(France) Pierre Lecru	France	Guichen	French Motorcycle National Championship					
1976	(Netherlands) Martin van Tol	Netherlands	Oldebroek	Dutch Motorcycle Championship					
1976	(Portugal) Francisco José Neto da Veiga	Portugal	Vila do Conde	Portuguese Motorcycle Championship					
1976	(France) Philippe Collas	France	Linas-Montlhéry	Challenge Honda France					
1977	(France) Laurent Bailo	France	Circuit de Lédenon	Promosport					
1977	(France) Alain Chantelat	France	Paul Ricard	Promosport					
1980	(France) Jean-Marie Adam	France	Paul Ricard	Challenge Raymond Acat					
1980	(France) Olivier Chevallier	France	Paul Ricard						
1981	(Finland) Jorma Nevala	Germany	Nürburgring	German Motorcycle Championship					
1981	(Uruguay) Gastón Biscia	Spain	Jarama	Spanish Motorcycle Championship					
1983	(France) Alain Cornier	France	Croix-en-Ternois	Yamaha Cup					
1984	(Netherlands) Jack Middelburg	Netherlands	Tolbert	Netherlands National RR Championship					
1984	(France) Hubert Génard	France	Bugatti	Open French Championship					
1985	(Netherlands) Ruud van Leijden	Netherlands	TT Circuit Assen	Dutch Motorcycle Championship					
1985	(Italy) Umberto Brighi	Italy	Vallelunga	Trofeo Gran Prix					
1985	(Italy) Lorenzo Ghiselli	Italy	Autodromo Dino Ferrari	Italian Motorcycle Championship					
1985	(Czechoslovakia) Vladimír Novák	Czechoslovakia	Piešťany airfield circuit						
1985	(Hungary) János Drapál	Czechoslovakia	Piešťany airfield circuit						
1985	(Denmark) Thomas Damgaard	Denmark	Anderstorp	Danish Road Racing Championship					
1985	(France) Philippe Crespy	France	Circuit de Lédenon	Promosport					
1986	(France) Jean-Luc Denevy	France	Magny-Cours	French Production Championship					
1986	(Germany) Hans Michael Kolb	Germany	Nürburgring	German Motorcycle Championship					
1986	(Poland) Zdzisław Lewandowski	Poland	Poznań	Polish Motorcycle Championship					
1987	(France) Christian Roubaud	France	Circuit d'Albi	Promosport					
1987	(France) Paul Baudry	France	Circuit d'Albi	Promosport					
1987	(Italy) Mauro Ceccoli	Italy	Monza	Yamaha Supertrophy					
1988	(France) Arnaud Fournet	France	Pau-Arnos	Promosport Cup - 350 cm3					
1988	(France) Patrick Durix	France	Paul Ricard	French 500 Open Championship					
1989	(Austria) Heinz Hutter	Austria	Salzburgring	Austrian Motorcycle Championship					
1990	(Spain) Javier Moreno	Spain	Jerez	Andalusian Motorcycle Championship					
1991	(Italy) Wilmer Marsigli	Italy	Monza	Italian Motorcycle Racing Championship					
1991	(France) Charly Coudour	France	Pau-Arnos	French Sidecar Championship					
1993	(Austria) Hans-Peter Klampfer	Austria	Zeltweg	Austrian Motorcycle Championship					
1996	(Italy) Marco Burnelli	Italy	Monza	Campionati Assoluti d'Italia					
1997	(France) Icham Abbassi	France	Bordeaux-Mérignac	Promosport					
1998	(Italy) Luca Niero	Italy	Mugello Circuit						
1999	(Italy) Claudio Carotti	Italy	Misano	Italian Motorcycle Speed Championship					
2002	(Netherlands) Rob Branderhorst	Belgium	Chimay	International Historic Racing Organisation					
2003	(Belgium) Ronny Vanhee	Belgium	Oostende	Belgian Yamaha R6 Cup					
2003	(Italy) Roberto Tani	Italy	Mugello Circuit						
2003	(Spain) Miguel Ángel Ferré	Spain	Calafat	Catalan Motorcycle Championship					
2004	(France) Jean-François Le Glatin	France	Bugatti	Open French Championship					
2004	(Germany) Gernot Backmann	Germany	Oschersleben	Internationalen Deutschen Motorradmeisterschaft					
2004	(Germany) Jürgen Oelschläger	Germany	Oschersleben	Internationalen Deutschen Motorradmeisterschaft					
2004	(Spain) José Manuel Suárez	Spain	Tarajalillo	Canary Road Championship					
2005	(France) Jean-Luc Chalumeau	France	Circuit de Lédenon	Promosport					
2005	(France) Stéphane Loicq	France	Circuit de Lédenon	Promosport					
2005	(France) Loïc Burdin	France	Val de Vienne	French Honda Cup					
2005	(Germany) Florian Ebert	Germany	Pannónia-Ring	Internationalen Deutschen Motorradmeisterschaft					
2005	(Russia) Nikolay Repnikov	Russia	St. Petersburg	Russian Motorcycle Championship					
2006	(Spain) Rubén Torres Fernández	Spain	Catalunya	Spanish Motorcycle Racing Championship					
2008	(Latvia) Aleksandrs Bekers	Latvia	Bikernieki	Latvian National Motorcycle Championship					
2008	(United Kingdom) Steve Norbury	Germany	Hockenheimring	Internationalen Deutschen Motorradmeisterschaft					
2009	(Germany) Dani Lo Bue	Germany	Oschersleben	Internationalen Deutschen Motorradmeisterschaft					
2010	(Italy) Giovanni Bicchierini	Italy	Vallelunga	FMI Cup					
2011	(Germany) Vítězslav Křepelka	Czech Republic	Hořice v Podkrkonoší	Czech Republic Supermono Championship					
2011	(Czech Republic) Robin Bořke	Czech Republic	Hořice v Podkrkonoší	Czech Road Racing Cup					
2011	(Denmark) Thomas Harding	Denmark	Padborg Park	Danish Superbike Championship					
2012	(United Kingdom) Sam Matthews	France	Magny-Cours	European Bikes					
2012	(France) Antoine Collignon	France	Val de Vienne	Weekend Racing Cup					
2014	(Italy) Emanuele Cassani	Italy	Misano	Bridgestone Champions Challenge					
2014	(Austria) Josef Strassnayr	Austria	Red Bull Ring	Ducati Speed Days					
2014	(Austria) Peter Benderle	Czech Republic	Ostrava	Czech Road Racing Cup					
2014	(Belgium) Julien Paquet	Belgium	Chimay	Belgian Supersport Open Championship					
2014	(Austria) Helmut Peer	Czech Republic	Brno	Czech Motorcycle Road Racing					
2014	(Austria) Reinhold Gutzelnig	Czech Republic	Brno	Czech Motorcycle Road Racing					
2015	(Czech Republic) Vítězslav Bican	Czech Republic	Hořice v Podkrkonoší	Czech Motorcycle Road Racing					
2015	(Germany) Jonas Hähle	Germany	Oschersleben	ADAC Junior Cup					
2016	(Netherlands) Wouter Hollegien	Netherlands	TT Circuit Assen	Dutch Open Wegrace Cup					
2016	(Czech Republic) Olin Hanák	Czech Republic	Ostrava	Czech Road Racing Cup					
2017	(France) Adrien Protat	France	Bugatti	Supersport Pirelli Championship					
2017	(United Kingdom) Mark Fincham	Thruxton Circuit	British Superstock 1000						
2019	(Germany) Dennis Lippert	Germany	Oschersleben	Internationalen Deutschen Motorradmeisterschaft					
2019	(Spain) Marcos Garrido	Spain	Jerez	Andalusian Motorcycle Championship					
2019	(Portugal) Filipa Gomes	Portugal	Estoril	Copa Dunlop Motoval					
2021	(France) Adrien Boulay	France	Magny-Cours	Promosport					
2022	(Germany) Leon Langstädtler	Germany	Hockenheimring	Internationalen Deutschen Motorradmeisterschaft		2022	(England) Chrissy Rouse	Donington Park	British Superbike Championship
2025	(England) Owen Jenner	Oulton Park	British Supersport Championship						
2025	(New Zealand) Shane Richardson	Oulton Park	British Supersport Championship						

== National Series in North America ==
Year	Rider	Series	Circuit	Ref
1988	(United States) Randy Glenn	CCS	Daytona	
2000	(United States) Chris Tatro	Championship Cup Series	Daytona	
2000	(Canada) Glenn Schauble	RACE Ontario Superseries	Shannonville Motorsport Park	
2001	(United States) Stuart Stratton	Championship Cup Series	Daytona	
2003	(United States) Trent Dailey	WERA National Challenge Series	Talladega Gran Prix Raceway	
2008	(United States) Alex Lyskawa	Championship Cup Series	Summit Point Raceway	
2010	(United States) Peter Lenz	US Grand Prix Riders Union (MotoGP meet)	Indianapolis	
2013	(United States) Kenny Anderson	AFM	Buttonwillow Raceway	

== Asian National Series ==
Year	Rider	Country	Circuit	Series	Ref
1987	(Canada) Tom Walther	Japan	Fuji	All Japan Road Race Championship TT	
2002	(Japan) Yoshitetsu Ike	Japan	Tsukuba	Kantō Challenge Cup	
2010	(Switzerland) Pascal Grosjean	United Arab Emirates	Dubai Autodrome	United Arab Emirates Sportsbike Championship	
2011	(Philippines) Maico Buncio	Philippines	Clark International Speedway	Philippine Underbone King Championship	
2013	(Malaysia) Muhammad Izzat	Malaysia	Sepang	Malaysian Super Series	
2014	(Singapore) Milton Poh	Malaysia	Sepang	Malaysian Super Series	
2014	(Malaysia) Amaludin Abd Rahman	Malaysia	Sepang	Malaysian Super Series	
2017	(Indonesia) Ricky Atsiadi	Indonesia	Mandala-Merauke Street Circuit	Kapolres Cup 1	
2017	(Indonesia) Muhammad Fadil	Indonesia	Nabire Street Course	Motoprix Bupati Cup Nabire	
2017	(Indonesia) Muhammad Ihwal Zahran	Indonesia	Andi Djemma Circuit	Chalolo Road Race Palopo	
2018	(Italy) Federico Fratelli	United Arab Emirates	Dubai Autodrome	United Arab Emirates Sportsbike Championship	
2019	(Indonesia) Royn Polone	Indonesia	Sirkuit Sang Profesor	Gorontalo Regent Cup Motor Racing Regional Championship	
2019	(Indonesia) Muhammad Syukur	Indonesia	Lapangan Tugu Temporary Street Course	IMI Bengkalis Regional Road Racing Championship	
2019	(Indonesia) Ilham Pramudya	Indonesia	Arteri Rangas Circuit	Kapolresta Mamuju Cup I	
2019	(Indonesia) Dandy Latif	Indonesia	Sirkuit Puncak Mario	Indonesian South Sulawesi Road Racing Championship	
2019	(Indonesia) Afridza Munandar	Malaysia	Sepang	Asia Talent Cup	
2019	(Philippines) Amber Garcia	Thailand	Chang	Asia Road Racing Championship	
2019	(Indonesia) Safrianto Ilham	Indonesia	Kota Jantho Street Circuit	Indonesian Sumatra Regional Championship	
2022	(Indonesia) Kuntet Khalisa	Indonesia	La Ode Pandu Sports Facility	Indonesian Road Racing Open Championship	
2022	(Indonesia) Kevin Safaruddin Madria	Indonesia	Sentul	Idemitsu bLU cRU Yamaha Sunday Race	
2023	(Indonesia) Muhammad Putra	Indonesia	Bukittinggi Street Course	Kota Wisata Bukittinggi Road Race	
2023	(India) Shreyas Hareesh	India	Chennai	MMSC fmsci Indian National Motorcycle Racing Championship	
2023	(Indonesia) Andi Supriady	Indonesia	Paser Street Course	Bupati Paser Cup Road Races	
2025	(Indonesia) Awhin Sanjaya	Indonesia	Zabak National Circuit Jambi	Sumatera Cup Prix 2025	
2026	(Vietnam) Đinh Hoàng Quốc Hiếu	Vietnam	Cần Thơ Stadium	Vietnamese National Circular Motorcycle Racing Championship	

== National Series in South America ==
Year	Rider	Country	Circuit	Series	Ref
1958	(Venezuela) José Antonio "El Negro" Vivas	Venezuela	Caracas	Venezuelan Motorcycle Championship	
1974	(Brazil) Hélio Gumerato	Brazil	Goiânias	Brazilian Motorcycle Championship	
1983	(Venezuela) Arsenio Negrin	Venezuela	Turagua	Venezuelan Motorcycle Championship	
1984	(Brazil) José de Oliveira Peixoto	Brazil	Interlagos	São Paulo State Motorcycle Racing Championship	
1986	(Brazil) Ricardo de Jesus	Brazil	Tarumã	Yamaha RD 350 Cup	
1989	(Brazil) José da Penha Moreira	Brazil	Interlagos	São Paulo State Motorcycle Racing Championship	
1998	(Argentina) Gonzalo Gándola	Argentina	Villa Concepción del Tío	Argentinean Motorcycle Championship	
2006	(Ecuador) Christian Sánchez	Ecuador	Yahuarcocha	Ecuadorian National Motorcycle Championship	
2010	(Brazil) Bruno Freire Santiago	Brazil	Goiânias	Goiás State Motorcycle and Supermoto Championship	
2011	(Colombia) Luis Eduardo Peña	Colombia	Tocancipá	Colombian Pro Motorcycle Championship - Touring class	
2012	(Brazil) Willian Onzi	Brazil	Autódromo Internacional de Guaporé	Rio Grande do Sul Motorcycle Racing Championship	
2013	(Brazil) Cristiano Ferreira	Brazil	Interlagos	Moto 1000 GP, GP Light Class	
2013	(Ecuador) Luis Ramiro Pásquel	Ecuador	Yahuarcocha	Ecuadorian National Motorcycle Championship	
2014	(Brazil) Emerson Hidalgo	Brazil	Santa Cruz do Sul	Moto 1000 GP, GP Light Class	
2014	(Brazil) Dani Lenzi	Brazil	Curitiba	Moto 1000 GP, GP Light Class	
2015	(Argentina) Nico Kusmanich	Argentina	Autódromo Parque Ciudad	Southern Argentina Motorcycle Speed Contest	
2015	(Argentina) Claudio Valmaggio	Argentina	Autódromo Parque Ciudad	Southern Argentina Motorcycle Speed Contest	
2015	(Brazil) Joãozinho Sobreira	Brazil	Goiânias	Brazilian Motorcycle Championship	
2018	(Argentina) Gabriel Gerbasi	Argentina	Autódromo Hermanos Emiliozzi	Argentinean Superbike Championship - Yamaha R3 Cup	
2018	(Argentina) Silvano Bentaverri	Argentina	Autódromo Ciudad de Dolores	Province of Buenos Aires Motorcycle Championship - Moto 3 Pro	

== British National or Club Series ==
There have been over 120 recorded deaths in British motorcycle racing series since 1930.

== North West 200 and Irish Road Racing ==
Year	Rider	Series	Ref
1926	(United Kingdom) Ted Stuart	Ulster Grand Prix	
1928	(United Kingdom) J. C. Allen	Ulster Grand Prix	
1936	(United Kingdom) Ben Bickell	Ulster Grand Prix	
1939	(United Kingdom) Norman Wainwright	North West 200	
1949	(United Kingdom) P. L. Phillips	North West 200	
1951	(United Kingdom) William Bennison	North West 200	
1955	(United Kingdom) Julian Crossley	Ulster Grand Prix	
1956	(New Zealand) Bill Aislabie	North West 200	
1956	(Isle of Man) Derek Ennett	Ulster Grand Prix	
1961	(United Kingdom) Carl Todd	Killinchy 150	
1961	(Australia) Ron Miles	Ulster Grand Prix	
1970	(United Kingdom) Andy Manship	North West 200	
1973	(United Kingdom) Graham Fish	North West 200	
1974	(Northern Ireland) Norman Connor	Killinchy 150	
1977	(United Kingdom) Geoff Barry	Killinchy 150	
1977	(Isle of Man) George Oates	Ulster Grand Prix	
1977	(Isle of Man) John Molyneux	Ulster Grand Prix	
1978	(United Kingdom) Monty Swann	Ulster Grand Prix	
1978	(United Kingdom) John Williams	Ulster Grand Prix	
1979	(United Kingdom) Brian Hamilton	North West 200	
1979	(Northern Ireland) Tom Herron	North West 200	
1979	(Northern Ireland) Frank Kennedy	North West 200	
1980	(Northern Ireland) Mervyn Robinson	North West 200	
1982	(United Kingdom) John Newbold	North West 200	
1983	(Northern Ireland) Gerard Frame	Killinchy 150	
1986	Pat McLaughlin	North West 200	
1986	(Northern Ireland) Stephen Smyth	Ulster Grand Prix	
1987	(United Kingdom) Steve Bull	North West 200	
1987	Elaine Surgenor	Killinchy 150	
1987	(Germany) Klaus Klein	Ulster Grand Prix	
1992	(Northern Ireland) Oral Watson	Tandragee 100	
1992	(United Kingdom) Steve Johnson	Ulster Grand Prix	
1994	(United Kingdom) Geoff Calvin	Dundrod 150	
1995	(United Kingdom) Stanley Cooper	Fore Road Races	
1996	(United Kingdom) Daniel Humphreys	Tandragee 100	
1997	(Republic of Ireland) Steven Galligan	Ulster Grand Prix	
1999	(Northern Ireland) Donny Robinson	North West 200	
1999	(Northern Ireland) Owen McNally	Ulster Grand Prix	
2001	(Northern Ireland) Gerald Allaway	Ulster Grand Prix	
2002	(Northern Ireland) Gary Jess	Ulster Grand Prix	
2004	(United Kingdom) Andy Wallace	Ulster Grand Prix	
2005	(Northern Ireland) Richard Britton	Ballybunion Road Races	
2006	(Northern Ireland) Darran Lindsay	Killalane Road Races	
2007	(Northern Ireland) John Donnan	Tandragee 100	
2008	(Northern Ireland) Robert Dunlop	North West 200	
2008	(Republic of Ireland) Martin Finnegan	Tandragee 100	
2009	(Northern Ireland) Mark Young	North West 200	
2010	(Northern Ireland) Victor Gilmore	Killalane Road Races	
2012	(United Kingdom) Mark Buckley	North West 200	
2012	(United Kingdom) Lee Vernon	Dundrod 150	
2014	(Republic of Ireland) Noel Murphy	Tandragee 100	
2014	(United Kingdom) Simon Andrews	North West 200	
2016	(United Kingdom) Malachi Mitchell-Thomas	North West 200	
2017	(Italy) Dario Cecconi	Tandragee 100	
2017	(United Kingdom) Jamie Hodson	Ulster Grand Prix	
2018	(Northern Ireland) William Dunlop	Skerries 100	
2018	(France) Fabrice Miguet	Ulster Grand Prix	
2026	(Czech Republic) Kamil Holán	North West 200	

== Motocross ==
Year	Rider	Type	Series	Circuit	Ref
1975	(United States) Jim West	Motocross	Trans AMA Motocross Championship	Saddleback Park	
2004	(United States) Jason Ciarletta	Supercross	AMA Supercross Championship	Qualcomm Stadium	
2010	(Australia) Andrew McFarlane	Motocross	Australian Motocross Championship	Broadford Track	
2011	(United States) Josh Lichtle	Motocross	AMA Motocross Championship	Red Bud	
2025	(Australia) Joel Evans	Motocross	Australian ProMX Championship	Gillman Track	

== Japanese Parimutuel Flat Track ==
Since the beginning in 1950, 96 riders have lost their lives in paved flat-track motorcycle racing since the first death at Funabashi on 5 May 1951, with the most recent being at December 2021, nine of those since 1993, when the Suzuki AR600 engine became the specification engine in paved flat-track racing, replacing numerous competing engines including the Meguro, Triumph, Toyo, Kyokuto and the HKS produced Fuji; 23 of those since 1967, when it became compulsory for tracks to take place on paved asphalt, instead of dirt as is common in the similar speedway or flat track genres.

Year	Rider	Grade	Meeting	Circuit	Ref
1999	Junji Fujikawa			Funabashi	
1999	Masanobu Nakamura			Iizuka	
2002	Teruyoshi Irie			Sanyo	
2006	Kazuyoshi Hashimoto			Kawaguchi	
2007	Kosuke Asai			Kawaguchi	
2009	Hideki Nagai			Iizuka	
2012	Hiromi Sakai		Testing	Funabashi	
2021	Masato Sato		9th at Kawaguchi, 30 Oct.	Kawaguchi	
2021	Akira Kuroiwa		5th at Kawaguchi, 3 Dec	Kawaguchi	

== Board Track Racing ==
Year	Rider	Series	Circuit	Ref
1912	(United States) Eddie Hasha	Board Track Race	New Jersey Motordome	
1912	Harry Davis		Wandamere Motordrome	

== American Flat Track ==
Year	Rider	Series	Circuit	Ref
1924	(United States) Ray Weishaar	American Motorcyclist Association Event	Legion Ascot Speedway	
1927	(United States) Eddie Brinck	American Motorcyclist Association National	Eastern States Expo Speedway	
1971	(United States) Rusty Bradley	AMA Grand National Championship	Daytona	
1977	(United States) Jay Ridgeway	AMA Grand National Championship	DuQuoin State Fairgrounds	
1978	(United States) Russ Kerr	AMA Pro event	Asdhland County Fairgrounds	
1978	(United States) Donnie Tortorelli	AMA Pro event	Tulare Cycle Park	
1978	(United States) Larry Ross	AMA Pro event	Clark County Fairgrounds	
1978	(United States) Mike Escue	AMA Grand National Championship	DuQuoin State Fairgrounds	
1978	(United States) Stevie Foster	AMA Pro event	Santa Fe Speedway	
1990^	(United States) David Jones	AMA Grand National Championship	Louisville Downs	
1980	(United States) Steve Dallefeld	AMA Grand National Championship	Delaware State Fairgrounds	
1980	(United States) Mike Schmidt	AMA Pro event	Logan County Fairgrounds	
1980	(United States) Steve Polson	AMA Pro event	Ascot Park	
1981	(United States) Geoff Lowe	AMA Pro event	Rice County Fairgrounds	
1982	(United States) Willie Crabbe	AMA Grand National Championship	Santa Clara County Fairgrounds	
1982	(United States) Ted Guarasci	AMA Pro event	Allen County Fairgrounds	
1983	(United States) Mark Jones	AMA Grand National Championship	Brainerd International Raceway	
1983	(United States) Hugh Humble	AMA Grand National Championship	Brainerd International Raceway	
1983	(United States) Alan Reed	AMA Junior National	Peoria Motorcycle Clubgrounds	
1983	(United States) John Demoisey II	AMA Pro event	Amrou Grotto	
1984	(United States) Rick Levitte	AMA Pro event	Caro Fairgrounds	
1985	(United States) Randy Turbett	AMA Junior National	Illinois State Fairgrounds	
1988	(United States) Darell Davis	AMA Junior National	Erie County Fairgrounds	
1987	(United States) Gary Wielt	AMA Regional Championship	Shaheen Speedway	
1988	(United States) Ted Boody	AMA Regional Championship	Ascot Park	
1988	(United States) Joel Green	AMA 600 National	Illinois State Fairgrounds	
1990^{1}	(United States) Steve Eklund	AMA Grand National Championship	New Mexico State Fairgrounds	
1991	(United States) Joey Phelps	AMA Regional Championship	Illinois State Fairgrounds	
1992	(United States) Rodney Mashue	AMA Regional Championship	Darke County Fairgrounds	
1995	(United States) Rodney Farris	AMA Grand National Championship	DuQuoin State Fairgrounds	
1997	(United States) Andy Tresser	AMA Grand National Championship	Black Hills Speedway	
1999	(United States) Davey Camlin	AMA Grand National Championship	DuQuoin State Fairgrounds	
1999	(United States) Toby Jorgensen	AMA Grand National Championship	Lone Star Park	
2000	(United States) Dusty Faulds	AMA Hot Shoe event	Iowa State Fairgrounds	
2001	(United States) Danny Hart	West Coast Flat Track event	Bakersfield, CA	
2001	(United States) Rob Damron	West Coast Flat Track event	Perris Auto Speedway	
2001	(United States) Will Davis	AMA Grand National Championship	State Fair Speedway (Sedalia MO)	
2002	(United States) Jim Sumner	AMA Grand National Championship	Illinois State Fairgrounds	
2004	(United States) Aaron Creamer	AMA Hot Shoe event	Sturgis Fairgrounds	
2005	(United States) Teddy Taylor	West Coast Vintage Flat Track event	Tulare Cycle Park	
2010	(United States) Jesse Phibbs	AMA Grand National Championship	Indiana State Fairgrounds	
2014^{2}	(United States) Jethro Halbert	AMA Grand National Championship	Calistoga Speedway	
2016	(United States) Charlotte Kainz	AMA Grand National Championship	Sonoma County Fairgrounds	
2016	(United States) Kyle McGrane	AMA Grand National Championship	Sonoma County Fairgrounds	
2017	(United States) Jamison Minor	AMA Grand National Championship	Charlotte Motor Speedway	
2018	(United States) Alec Muth	AMA Grand National Championship	Black Hills Speedway	
2022	(United States) Ryan Varnes	AMA Grand National Championship	Weedsport Speedway	

^{1} Eklund's accident happened in 1990. He died in 1991 from his injuries.
^{2} Halbert's accident happened in 2014. He died in 2015 from his injuries.

== Enduro ==
Year	Rider	Circuit	Ref
2011‡	(Finland) Mika Ahola	Girona, Spain	

‡ Ahola's accident happened in 2011. He died in 2012, as a result of injuries sustained.

== Other rallying events ==
- 2001 John Deacon (GBR) Rally France/Jordan
- 2004 Richard Sainct (FRA) Rallye des Pharaons

== Miscellaneous ==
Year	Rider	Circuit	Ref
2000	(Northern Ireland) Joey Dunlop	Pirita-Kose-Kloostrimetsa Circuit (Tallinn, Estonia)	

== Other superbike series ==
Year	Rider	Series	Circuit	Ref
1992	(United States) Larry Schwarzbach	AMA Superbike Championship	Mid-Ohio	
1992	(Argentina) Horacio Aita	Santa Rosa	Argentinean Superbike Championship	
1993	(United States) Jimmy Adamo	AMA Superbike Championship	Daytona	
2000	(Canada) Frank Wilson Jr.	Canadian Superbike Championship	Shannonville Motorsport Park	
2007	(England) Ollie Bridewell	Mallory Park	British Superbike Championship	
2013	(Canada) Christian Auger	Canadian Superbike Championship	Mosport	
2013	(Canada) J. R. MacRae	Canadian Superbike Championship	Mont-Tremblant	
2013	(Argentina) Gerónimo Sánchez	Autódromo Jorge Ángel Pena	Cuyan Superbike Zonal Championship	
2015	(Spain) Bernat Martinez	MotoAmerica	Mazda Raceway Laguna Seca	
2015	(Spain) Dani Rivas	MotoAmerica	Mazda Raceway Laguna Seca	
2017	(Brazil) Sérgio dos Santos	Interlagos	SuperBike Brasil	
2017	(Argentina) Federico Palacio	Autódromo Juan Oria	Argentinean Superbike Central Championship	
2018	(Brazil) Rogério Munuera	Interlagos	SuperBike Brasil	
2019	(Brazil) Maurício Paludete	Interlagos	SuperBike Brasil	
2019	(Brazil) Danilo Berto	Interlagos	SuperBike Brasil	
2020	(Dominican Republic) Indiana Muñoz	Goianias	Goias Superbike	
2020	(Brazil) Matheus Barbosa	Interlagos	SuperBike Brasil	
2022	(United States) Scott Briody	Brainerd GP	MotoAmerica (Superbikes at Minnesota)	
2022	(United Kingdom) Chrissy Rouse	Donington Park	British Superbike Championship	
2023	(Japan) Haruki Noguchi	Mandalika	Asia Road Racing Championship	
2023	(Japan) Otojiro Tanimoto	Motegi	All Japan Road Race Championship JSB1000	
2026	(Austria) Philipp Steinmayr	Alpe Adria International Motorcycle Championship	Automotodrom Brno	
2026	(Romania) Adrian Rus	Alpe Adria International Motorcycle Championship	Automotodrom Brno	

== Other supersport series ==
Year	Rider	Series	Circuit	Ref
2005	(Japan) Shiro Okagawa	Motegi	All Japan Road Race Championship ST 600	
2007	(Japan) Masao Okuno	SUGO	All Japan Road Race Championship ST 600	
2012	(Japan) Naoki Kato	Motegi	All Japan Road Race Championship ST 600	
2024	(Japan) Ryota Haga	Autopolis	All Japan Road Race Championship ST 600	
2025	(United Kingdom) Owen Jenner	Oulton Park	British Supersport Championship	
2025	(New Zealand) Shane Richardson	Oulton Park	British Supersport Championship	
2025	(Spain) Borja Gómez	Circuit de Magny-Cours	FIM Stock European Championship	
2025	(Italy) Gabriele Cotini	Cremona Circuit	Dunlop Cup 600 Supersport	
