= Tomoko Igata =

Japanese motorcycle racer

- Nationality: Japanese
- Born: October 30, 1965 (age 61)
Motorcycle racing career statistics
MotoGP World Championship
Active years	1992 - 1995
First Grand Prix	1992 125cc Japanese Grand Prix
Last Grand Prix	1995 125cc Catalan Grand Prix
Manufacturers	Honda
Championships	0
Starts / Wins / Podiums / Poles / F. laps / Points; 25 / 0 / 0 / -

Tomoko Igata (井形とも子, born October 30, 1965) is a Japanese former professional Grand Prix motorcycle road racer. She competed in the Grand Prix world championships from 1992 to 1995. Igata is notable for being the second full-time female rider after Taru Rinne, to compete in Grand Prix motorcycle racing history. In 2016, Igata was named an FIM Legend for her pioneering Grand Prix racing career. She is the sister of pioneering motorcycle racer, Mari Igata.

== Motorcycle racing career ==
Igata competed in the 125cc All Japan Road Race Championship from 1991 to 1993, finishing in the top-ten every year. Her best result was in 199q when she finished sixth in the Championship. In 1992, Igata made her Grand Prix debut at Suzuka as a wild card where she survived the treacherous wet track finishing 20th and capturing the attention of the media.

In 1994, Igata signed up for a full 125cc World Championship with the FCC Technical Sports team racing a Honda RS125. Igata immediately won two points at the first race in Australia and rode an impressive race in Suzuka, but was injured in a crash at the Austrian Grand Prix and was replaced by her teammate in Japanese championship Tomomi Manako. She returned towards the end of season to finish 28th in the Championship.

Igata again competed in the 1995 season and achieved a best place finish of seventh at the Czech Grand Prix after having also occupied the fifth place during the race; the highest placing for a female in the history of the Championship. She ended the season in 20th.

Igata subsequently returned to Japanese racing in the 125cc class but without major success.

In 2016, Igata was awarded the FIM Women's Legend Rider, becoming the first Japanese rider to receive the honor.
