= 1984 All Japan Road Race Championship =

Motorcycle road racing season

The 1984 MFJ All Japan Road Race Championship (Japanese: 1984 MFJ全日本ロードレース選手権シリーズ, Hepburn: 1984 MFJ Zen Nihon Rōdo Rēsu Senshuken Shirīzu) was the 18th MFJ Road Race season of the All Japan Road Race Championship since the series-format started, and the 23rd consecutive year since the first All Japan race was held after the MFJ was established. The season began at Suzuka on 10 March, and concluded on 28 October at Tsukuba.

== Calendar ==
Round	Circuit	Location	Date	Class	Map of circuit locations
1	Suzuka Circuit	(Mie Prefecture) Suzuka, Mie	10–11 March	GP500, TT-F1 (Note: Part of the 2&4 event.)	1984 All Japan Road Race Championship is located in Japan
2	Tsukuba Circuit	(Ibaraki Prefecture) Shimotsuma, Ibaraki	24–25 March	GP500, GP250, GP125, TT-F3	1984 All Japan Road Race Championship is located in Japan
3	Sportsland Sugo	(Miyagi Prefecture) Murata, Miyagi	7–8 April	GP500, GP250, GP125, TT-F1, TT-F3	1984 All Japan Road Race Championship is located in Japan
4	Suzuka Circuit	(Mie Prefecture) Suzuka, Mie	21–22 April	GP500, GP250, GP125, TT-F1, TT-F3	1984 All Japan Road Race Championship is located in Japan
5	Tsukuba Circuit	(Ibaraki Prefecture) Shimotsuma, Ibaraki	12–13 May	GP500, GP250, GP125, TT-F3	1984 All Japan Road Race Championship is located in Japan
6	Sportsland Sugo	(Miyagi Prefecture) Murata, Miyagi	25–26 May	GP500, GP250, GP125, TT-F1, TT-F3	1984 All Japan Road Race Championship is located in Japan
7	Suzuka Circuit	(Mie Prefecture) Suzuka, Mie	9–10 June	GP500, GP250, GP125, TT-F1, TT-F3	1984 All Japan Road Race Championship is located in Japan
8	Tsukuba Circuit	(Ibaraki Prefecture) Shimotsuma, Ibaraki	23–24 June	GP500, GP250, GP125, TT-F3	1984 All Japan Road Race Championship is located in Japan
9	Sportsland Sugo	(Miyagi Prefecture) Murata, Miyagi	25–26 August	GP500, GP250, GP125, TT-F3	1984 All Japan Road Race Championship is located in Japan
10	Suzuka Circuit	(Mie Prefecture) Suzuka, Mie	8–9 September	GP500, GP250, GP125, TT-F1, TT-F3	1984 All Japan Road Race Championship is located in Japan
11	Tsukuba Circuit	(Ibaraki Prefecture) Shimotsuma, Ibaraki	27–28 October	GP500, GP250, GP125, TT-F3	1984 All Japan Road Race Championship is located in Japan

== Class changes ==
The 1984 season introduced the TT-F1 and TT-F3 classes, along with the existing GP500, GP250 and GP125. The TT Formula categories primarily featured modified production motorcycles, generally four-strokes, rather than the purpose-built two-stroke Grand Prix machines. Unlike in future superbike classes, regulations were more permissive regarding chassis construction, with some machines being effectively prototypes built around production-derived engines.

== Champions by class ==
Class	Rider	Manufacturer	Points
GP500	(Japan) Tadahiko Taira	Yamaha	175
GP250	(Japan) Masaru Kobayashi	Honda	101
GP125	(Japan) Jiro Kuriya	Honda	153
TT-F1	(Japan) Shunji Yatsushiro	Honda	56
TT-F3	(Japan) Tadashi Ezaki	Yamaha	120

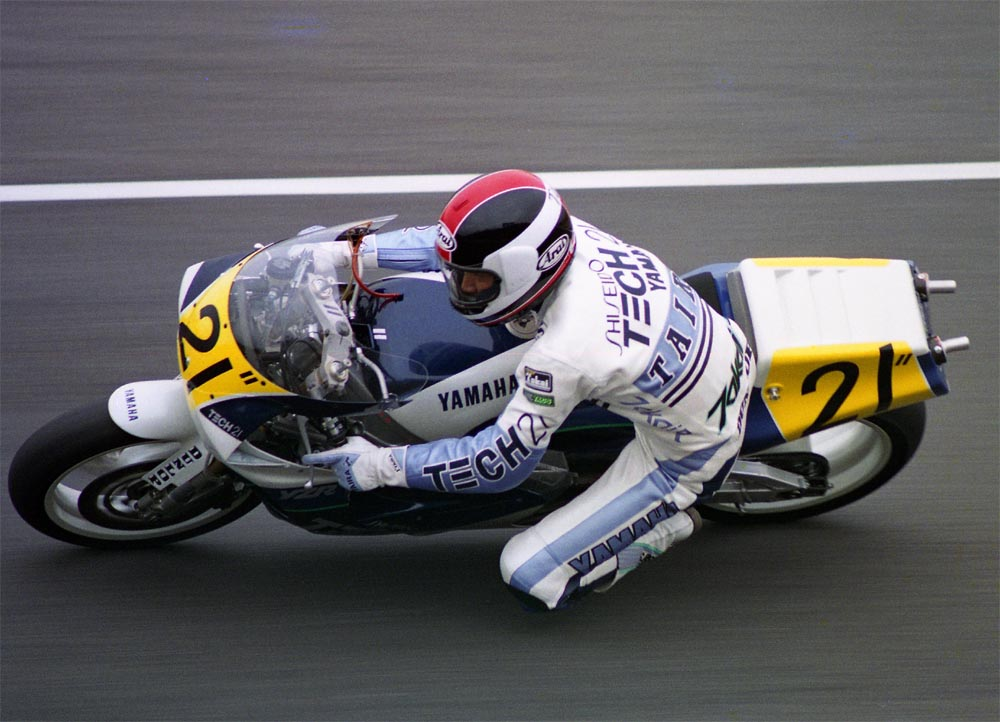
Tadahiko Taira was the GP500 champion.

== Championship standings ==
Scoring system

Points were awarded to the top fifteen finishers. The same point system was used across the five classes. Three extra-points were awarded in the 10th round at the Japanese Grand Prix at Suzuka Circuit. (Note: The Japanese Grand Prix was a domestic championship event and not part of the motorcycle Grand Prix World Championship.)

Position	1st	2nd	3rd	4th	5th	6th	7th	8th	9th	10th	11th	12th	13th	14th	15th
Points (Rd. 1–9, 11)	20	17	15	13	11	10	9	8	7	6	5	4	3	2	1
Points (Rd. 10)	23	20	18	16	14	13	12	11	10	9	8	7	6	5	4

The number of points-scoring positions depended on how many motorcycles entered the race.

Number of entrants	30<	28–29	26–27	24–25	22–23	20–21	18–19	16–17	14–15	12–13	10–11	8–9	6–7	5
Last point-scoring position	15th	14th	13th	12th	11th	10th	9th	8th	7th	6th	5th	4th	3rd	2nd

=== Riders' standings ===
==== GP500 ====
Pos.	Rider	Bike	SUZ (Mie Prefecture)	TSU (Ibaraki Prefecture)	SUG (Miyagi Prefecture)	SUZ (Mie Prefecture)	TSU (Ibaraki Prefecture)	SUG (Miyagi Prefecture)	SUZ (Mie Prefecture)	TSU (Ibaraki Prefecture)	SUG (Miyagi Prefecture)	SUZ (Mie Prefecture)	TSU (Ibaraki Prefecture)	Pts
1	(Japan) Tadahiko Taira	Yamaha		1	1	1	1^{P}	2	3	1	1	1^{F}		175
2	(Japan) Keiji Kinoshita	Honda	1^{P}	2	3	3^{P}	4	1	1^{P F}	2	2	Ret^{P}	1	174
3	(Japan) Hiroyuki Kawasaki	Yamaha	3^{F}		2	2	2	3	4	4	3	2	6	152
4	(Japan) Masaru Mizutani	Suzuki	Ret	3	5	4	5	4	Ret	5	4	Ret	2	104
5	(Japan) Osamu Suzuki	Yamaha	7	5	6	9	7		6		8	6		77
6	(Japan) Yoshihisa Hasegawa	Honda	4			Ret			7	7	6	3	4	72
7	(Japan) Hidehiko Fukushima	Suzuki		4		8	8		9	6	7	7	7	69
8	(Japan) Takao Abe	Honda	DNS		4	5		5	2				5	63
9	(Japan) Shinichi Ueno	Yamaha	Ret			Ret	3			3		4	3	61
10	(Japan) Takumi Ito	Suzuki	2	7		11		6	5			15†		47
11	(Japan) Hideo Hotate	Suzuki				7	9		10	8		10		33
12	(Japan) Susumu Shimada	Honda	DNS	6		Ret			12	9		5		31
13	(Japan) Hisashi Yamana	Suzuki	6	8		Ret			11			8		29
14	(Japan) Yoshiharu Matsumoto	Suzuki					6					11		18
15	(Japan) Jin Saito	Suzuki	5			10						Ret		17
16	(Japan) Sadao Asami	Yamaha	DNS								5			11
17	(Japan) Shigeharu Otsuka	Yamaha	8			6			Ret					10
18	(Japan) Hiroo Takemura	Suzuki										9		10
19	(Japan) Yukiya Ueda	Honda	9			Ret			8					8
	(Japan) Takashi Yoshimi	Yamaha	10			12			Ret			12		0
	(Japan) Yutaka Sugano	Suzuki				Ret			13†					0
	(Japan) Rikiya Takahashi	Suzuki										13		0
	(Japan) Sakae Koizumi	Yamaha										14		0
	(Japan) Joji Okamoto	Yamaha	Ret									Ret		0
	(Japan) Yasuaki Fujimoto	Yamaha	Ret											0
	(Japan) Miyoshi Abe	Yamaha	Ret											0
	(Japan) Toshimitsu So	Honda				Ret								0
	(Japan) Takazumi Katayama	Honda										Ret		0
	(Japan) Isoyo Sugimoto	Yamaha										Ret		0
	(France) Raymond Roche	Honda										Ret		0
	(Japan) Yutaka Kanno	Suzuki	DNS											0
	(Japan) Hitoshi Saito	Suzuki	DNS											0
	(Japan) Toshihiro Yoshimura	Honda	DNS											0

Notes:

- † – Rider did not finish the race, but was classified as they completed more than 75% of the race distance.

==== GP250 ====
Pos.	Rider	Bike	TSU (Ibaraki Prefecture)	SUG (Miyagi Prefecture)	SUZ (Mie Prefecture)	TSU (Ibaraki Prefecture)	SUG (Miyagi Prefecture)	SUZ (Mie Prefecture)	TSU (Ibaraki Prefecture)	SUG (Miyagi Prefecture)	SUZ (Mie Prefecture)	TSU (Ibaraki Prefecture)	Pts
1	(Japan) Masaru Kobayashi	Honda	6		9	12	8	10	3	1	5	2	101
2	(Japan) Seigo Kikuchi	Yamaha	1	8	2	7	6	Ret		11	9	12	83
3	(Japan) Hiroshi Okumura	Yamaha	9	3	1^{P F}			2			Ret	1	79
4	(Japan) Ryoichi Arai	Yamaha			Ret	11	4	4	6	3	1^{F}		79
5	(Japan) Shinji Ito	Yamaha		2	4	2	5	Ret	1		Ret		78
6	(Japan) Shinji Katayama	Yamaha	4	10	13	3	9	Ret	4		7	8	77
7	(Japan) Mitsuo Saito	Yamaha	2				2	1^{F}				4	67
8	(Japan) Osamu Hiwatashi	Honda		5				8		2	2	5	67
9	(Japan) Hideo Mikami	Yamaha	3	7	Ret	1		9	9	13	16		61
10	(Japan) Takao Abe	Honda				4	1	7				3	57
11	(Japan) Shoji Hiratsuka	Yamaha		1			3	Ret		9	10		51
12	(Japan) Hiromi Yamashita	Yamaha			8			3		12	3	10	51
13	(Japan) Takayoshi Yamamoto	Yamaha	14				12	5		5	6		41
14	(Japan) Ryoji Ishikawa	Yamaha		6	6	6						11	35
15	(Japan) Shunji Yatsushiro	Honda	11			5			2				33
16	(Japan) Hideshi Tomita	Yamaha								4	11	6	33
17	(Japan) Akira Sakaguchi	Honda			10			12	10	6	Ret	9	33
18	(Japan) Hiroo Takemura	Yamaha	7		7					10	12		31
19	(Japan) Hisashi Nishikawara	Yamaha	5		Ret		7	6			Ret		30
20	(Japan) Masaharu Kasuno	Yamaha		4	15†	9		Ret^{P}		7	Ret		29
21	(Japan) Mitsuo Sato	Yamaha	10		12		11	17	7		14		29
22	(Japan) Yasuaki Fujimoto	Yamaha								8	4		24
23	(Japan) Kiyotaka Sakai	Yamaha		9	3								22
24	(Japan) Toshihiro Wakayama	Yamaha			5						8		22
25	(Japan) Toshiya Nakamura	Yamaha						13	5		13		20
26	(Japan) Shoji Amada	Honda				8		Ret	8	14	NC		18
27	(Japan) Hiroyuki Kakutani	Yamaha	12	11			10	Ret					15
28	(Japan) Norio Iyobe	Honda					13	15				7	13
29	(Japan) Mitsuyoshi Terada	Yamaha	8										8
30	(Japan) Kenichi Fujita	Yamaha	13		11			18†					8
31	(Japan) Mitsuo Tanaka	Yamaha						14	11				7
32	(Japan) Masahiko Ishikawa	Yamaha				10					Ret		6
33	(Japan) Sankichi Abe	Yamaha			Ret			11					5
34	(Japan) Rikiya Takahashi	Yamaha									15		4
35	(Japan) Suguru Yoshimi	Yamaha			14			16			17		2
	(Japan) Kiichiro Furuya	Yamaha			16†			Ret			Ret		0
	(Japan) Toshihiko Minamiguchi	Yamaha						Ret			Ret		0
	(Japan) Tadao Kato	Yamaha			Ret								0
	(Japan) Yasuo Kikuchi	Yamaha						Ret					0

Notes:

- † – Rider did not finish the race, but was classified as they completed more than 75% of the race distance.

==== GP125 ====
Pos.	Rider	Bike	TSU (Ibaraki Prefecture)	SUG (Miyagi Prefecture)	SUZ (Mie Prefecture)	TSU (Ibaraki Prefecture)	SUG (Miyagi Prefecture)	SUZ (Mie Prefecture)	TSU (Ibaraki Prefecture)	SUG (Miyagi Prefecture)	SUZ (Mie Prefecture)	TSU (Ibaraki Prefecture)	Pts
1	(Japan) Jiro Kuriya	Honda	5	3	3	1	1	5	2	4	4	3	153
2	(Japan) Masato Shima	Honda	3	5	4	2	6	6		1	3	2	131
3	(Japan) Eiji Tomita	Honda		4	Ret	5	3	4	1	3	1^{P F}	1	130
4	(Japan) Masaki Shinoda	Honda	4	2	2	4				5	2	4	104
5	(Japan) Yoichi Yamamoto	Honda	2	6	1^{P F}		2	2^{P}					81
6	(Japan) Hidetoshi Koshiyama	Honda			5	6	4	3	3		8		75
7	(Japan) Noriaki Ichinose	Honda	1	1	Ret			1^{F}					60
8	(Japan) Seiji Yamada	Honda					5	8		2	7		40
9	(Japan) Masayuki Shiono	Honda			7	3		9	4		12		37
10	(Japan) Mari Igata	Honda			14			Ret	5		5	5	36
11	(Japan) Masao Kaneko	Honda	6		8			11		6	9		28
12	(Japan) Hiroshi Shinjo	Honda	7		Ret				6		Ret		19
13	(Japan) Kazuhito Takeda	Honda			6			7			Ret		19
14	(Japan) Takaaki Iwase	Honda	8		9			10			Ret		15
15	(Japan) Masahiro Nakahira	Honda			10			13			6		13
	(Japan) Fumiaki Yoshikawa	Honda			11			12			10		
	(Japan) Sadao Sakamoto	Honda			13†			Ret			11		
	(Japan) Shoichi Matsui	Honda			12								
	(Japan) Haruo Takase	Honda			15†								

Notes:

- † – Rider did not finish the race, but was classified as they completed more than 75% of the race distance.

==== TT-F1 ====
A contemporary, race-prepared Suzuki GSX-R750, similar to the ones used by TT-F1 Suzuki riders.

Pos.	Rider	Bike	SUZ (Mie Prefecture)	SUZ (Mie Prefecture)	SUZ (Mie Prefecture)	SUZ (Mie Prefecture)	Pts
1	(Japan) Shunji Yatsushiro	Honda	1^{F}	4	Ret	1^{F}	56
2	(Japan) Shinji Hagiwara	Honda		1	1	4	56
3	(Japan) Shosuke Kita	Kawasaki	4	3		3	46
4	(Japan) Takeshi Yokoi	Honda	7	2	6	5	41
5	(Japan) Hiroyuki Ito	Honda		5	7	7	32
6	(Japan) Toshiharu Araki	Honda	5	6	8	Ret	29
7	(Japan) Masaki Tokuno	Honda	2^{P}	DNS	Ret		17
8	(Japan) Noboru Miura	Suzuki	3	DNS^{P}		Ret	15
9	(Japan) Shinichi Ueno	Yamaha			4		13
10	(Japan) Kazuma Morimitsu	Honda	6	Ret	5	Ret	11
11	(Japan) Motoyoshi Kitano	Suzuki				8	11
12	(Japan) Yuji Amano	Kawasaki	DNS	Ret	9	9	10
	(Japan) Tadataka Hanaoka	Suzuki	10	7	Ret	Ret	
	(Japan) Jun Kinoshita	Honda	8				
	(Japan) Kenji Sakakibara	Honda	9	Ret	10	Ret	
	(Japan) Norifusa Sakata	Honda				10	
	(Japan) Susumu Fujimoto	Honda				11	
	(Japan) Nao Ikeda	Suzuki	Ret	DNS	Ret	12†^{P}	
	(Japan) Mamoru Yamakawa	Kawasaki			Ret		
	(Japan) Shigeharu Otsuka	Suzuki				Ret	
Riders without an MFJ license ineligible for points
	(New Zealand) Graeme Crosby	Suzuki			2	2	
	(South Africa) Kork Ballington	Kawasaki			3		
	(United Kingdom) Neil Robinson	Honda				6	
	(Australia) Wayne Gardner	Honda			Ret		

Notes:

- † – Rider did not finish the race, but was classified as they completed more than 75% of the race distance.

==== TT-F3 ====
Pos.	Rider	Bike	TSU (Ibaraki Prefecture)	SUZ (Mie Prefecture)	TSU (Ibaraki Prefecture)	SUG (Miyagi Prefecture)	SUZ (Mie Prefecture)	TSU (Ibaraki Prefecture)	SUG (Miyagi Prefecture)	SUZ (Mie Prefecture)	TSU (Ibaraki Prefecture)	Pts
1	(Japan) Tadashi Ezaki	Yamaha		1^{F}	1	3	2		3	3^{P}	3	120
2	(Japan) Hideo Kawai	Honda	3	3	2		4	2		6	2	107
3	(Japan) Noboru Miura	Suzuki	2	DNS^{P}			11†	3	1	1^{F}		75
4	(Japan) Nao Ikeda	Suzuki			3	1	5			5		60
5	(Japan) Yoichi Yamamoto	Honda					1^{F}		6	4	4	59
6	(Japan) Shoji Hiratsuka	Yamaha				2	Ret		2		1	54
7	(Japan) Osamu Hiwatashi	Moriwaki Honda	1	2			3					52
8	(Japan) Takashi Suzuki	Yamaha		4		4	6			Ret		36
9	(Japan) Shinji Hagiwara	Honda						1	4	Ret		33
10	(Japan) Kenichi Fujita	Honda				5	Ret	6		7		33
11	(Japan) Tsunehiko Wada	Yamaha		6			8			9	5	31
12	(Japan) Minoru Wada	Yamaha			4		9			8		24
13	(Japan) Michio Nanao	Suzuki		Ret				4		Ret		13
14	(Japan) Takeshi Tojo	Yamaha		5			10			Ret		11
15	(Japan) Yoshio Takahashi	Yamaha						5				11
16	(Japan) Kazuma Morimitsu	Honda							5	Ret		11
17	(Japan) Motoyoshi Kitano	Yamaha								10		9
	(Japan) Susumu Fujimoto	Kawasaki		7			7					
	(Japan) Hiroaki Sakai	Suzuki		8†						Ret		
	(Japan) Takashi Sugiyama	Honda		Ret								
	(Japan) Mamoru Yamakawa	Yamaha								Ret		
	(Japan) Shigeharu Otsuka	Yamaha								Ret		
Riders without an MFJ license ineligible for points
	(New Zealand) Graeme Crosby	Suzuki								2		

Notes:

- † – Rider did not finish the race, but was classified as they completed more than 75% of the race distance.
