= Peter Huber (motorcyclist) =

Swiss motorcyclist (1954–1983)

- Nationality: Swiss
- Born: 25 December 1954; St. Gallen, Switzerland
- Died: 31 July 1983 (aged 28); Silverstone, Northamptonshire, United Kingdom
Motorcycle racing career statistics
MotoGP World Championship
Active years	1982 – 1983
Starts / Wins / Podiums / Poles / F. laps / Points; 8 / 0 / 0 / 0 / 0 / 0

Peter Huber (25 December 1954 – 31 July 1983) was a Swiss motorcycle rider who competed in Grand Prix motorcycle racing from 1982 to 1983, until his death at the Silverstone Circuit, along with Norman Brown. He raced in the 500cc class as a privateer.

== Motorcycle career ==
Peter Huber was born in St. Gallen, Switzerland on 25 December 1954. He was previously a mechanic. In the 1982 Grand Prix motorcycle racing season, he competed with a Suzuki RG500, entering 3 races but only finishing one, the 1982 San Marino motorcycle Grand Prix. In the 1983 Grand Prix motorcycle racing season, he entered 5 races, finishing 4 of them.

== Death ==
Huber died at the 1983 British motorcycle Grand Prix. He collided into Norman Brown, and was found unconscious. He was taken to the John Radcliffe Hospital, where he was pronounced dead on arrival.

== See also ==
- List of rider deaths in motorcycle racing
