= Tandragee 100 =

Multi-race motorcycle event in Northern Ireland

- Venue: Road course (clockwise)
- Location: Tandragee, County Armagh, Northern Ireland
- First race: 1958
- Most wins (rider): Ryan Farquhar (19)

Circuit information
- Surface: Tarmac
- Length: 5.3 mi (8.5 km)

The Tandragee 100 is a motorcycle race that occurs on the public roads which connect Tandragee and Markethill, near the village of Clare, in County Armagh, Northern Ireland. Spanning 5.3 miles, it is sometimes referred to by its organisers as the 'Mini TT'.

== History ==
The first race of the North Armagh Motorcycle & Car Club (abbreviated to 'North Armagh MC & CC') was held on Saturday 19 April 1958 over a distance of 100 miles – hence the number in the name. For safety and organisational reasons and because of the increased performance of the participating motorcycles, the distance was repeatedly reduced. In the meantime, depending on the racing class, only four to seven laps are driven on a track, so that a race lasts an average of a quarter of an hour. It is one of the first races of the Irish road racing season. According to organisers, the race attracts about 120 drivers and up to 12,000 spectators.

While typically held annually, the Tandragee 100 was not held in 1972 and 2001. The race was again cancelled in 2010 due to the "economic climate and circumstances beyond [the organiser's] control". The race also did not take place during 2020 or 2021 due to COVID-19. It was also cancelled in 2023 (due to insurance costs) and again in 2024 (due to the condition of the road surface). The 2025 event, the first since 2022, was won by Michael Dunlop who set a course record (of 111.58mph) on his final circuit.

== Participants ==
The Tandragee 100 has previously played host to a number of notable road racers. These have included: Guy Martin, Joey Dunlop, Ryan Farquhar, Philip McCallen and Michael Dunlop.

== Winners record ==
Riders	Wins	Participation
Ryan Farquhar	19	1995–2016
Joey Dunlop	18	1971–2000
Brian Reid	14	1980–1994
Michael Dunlop	12	2006–2025
Ray McCullough	10	1971–1982
Phillip McCallen	9	1988–1999
Sam McClements	8	1981–1989
William Dunlop	8	2008–2016
Robert Dunlop	7	1985–2006

== Fatalities at the event ==
Martin Finnegan, from County Dublin, was killed following a crash at the course in 2008. Several other riders died, following accidents on the course, at the 2007, 2014, 2017, and 2026 events. A memorial garden, to the riders and spectators who died during the annual event, was submitted for planning assessment in late 2019.

Rider	Year
Bob Thompson	1961
Michael Shanahan	1977
Rab Duncan	1990
Oral Watson	1992
Daniel Humphreys	1996
Maurice Wilson	2004
John Donnan	2007
Martin Finnegan	2008
Noel Murphy	2014
Dario Cecconi	2017
James Walsh	2026
