= Mari Igata =

Japanese motorcycle racer (1958–2024)

- 井形 マリ
- Born: March 16, 1958; Bunkyō,Tokyo
- Died: August 13, 2024 (aged 66)
- Years active: 1978–1990
- Known for: Motorcycling pioneer
- Relatives: Tomoko Igata (sister)
- Website: https://www.t-mari.net/

Mari Igata (Japanese: 井形 マリ, romanized: Igata Mari; March 16, 1958 – August 13, 2024) was a pioneering Japanese professional Grand Prix motorcycle road racer. She would become the first woman to race in the Suzuka 8 Hours and the All Japan Road Race Championship. A member of the Showa era, Igata is remembered for breaking barriers for Japanese women in sport, as well as creating opportunities for the next generation with her Team Mari racing school. Igata was the elder sister of championship racer Tomoko Igata.

== Background ==
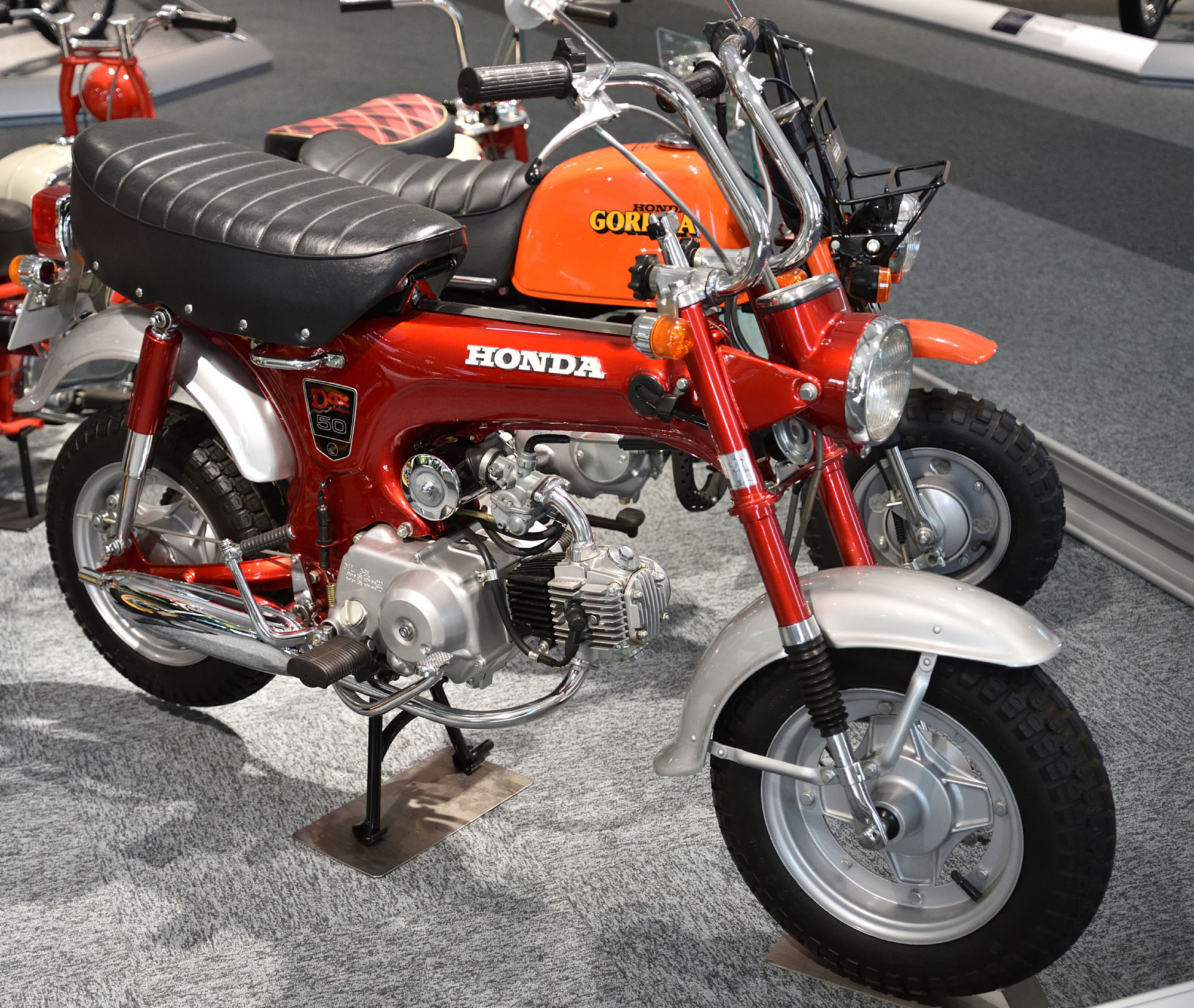
Aa 1969 Honda Dax, similar to the first motorcycle purchased by Igata.

Igata was born in Bunkyō, Tokyo in 1958. She became interested in motorcycles early, buying a 50cc Honda Dax in her second year of high school.

In 1975 at age 18, Igata was hired by Honda as an administrative typist. She soon turned to racing when she learned about Honda's "Blue Helmets" team. Initially, she was turned away, but kept returning to the team's club room, performing menial tasks such as refueling the bikes until they suggested giving her a 125cc to ride.

In 1978, Igata made her competitive debut, initially on 125cc motorcycles. In 1982, she was the second woman in Japan to be promoted to an International A-class license when she was 24 years old. From 1983 to 1984, she participated in the Suzuka 8 Hours Endurance Road Race, becoming the first woman in the world to do so. By 1985, she placed fifth in the All Japan Championship International A-class 125 rankings. Her fifth-place ranking would be the highest result achieved by a woman for 39 years, when Shizuka Okazaki placed fourth in the rankings in 2024.

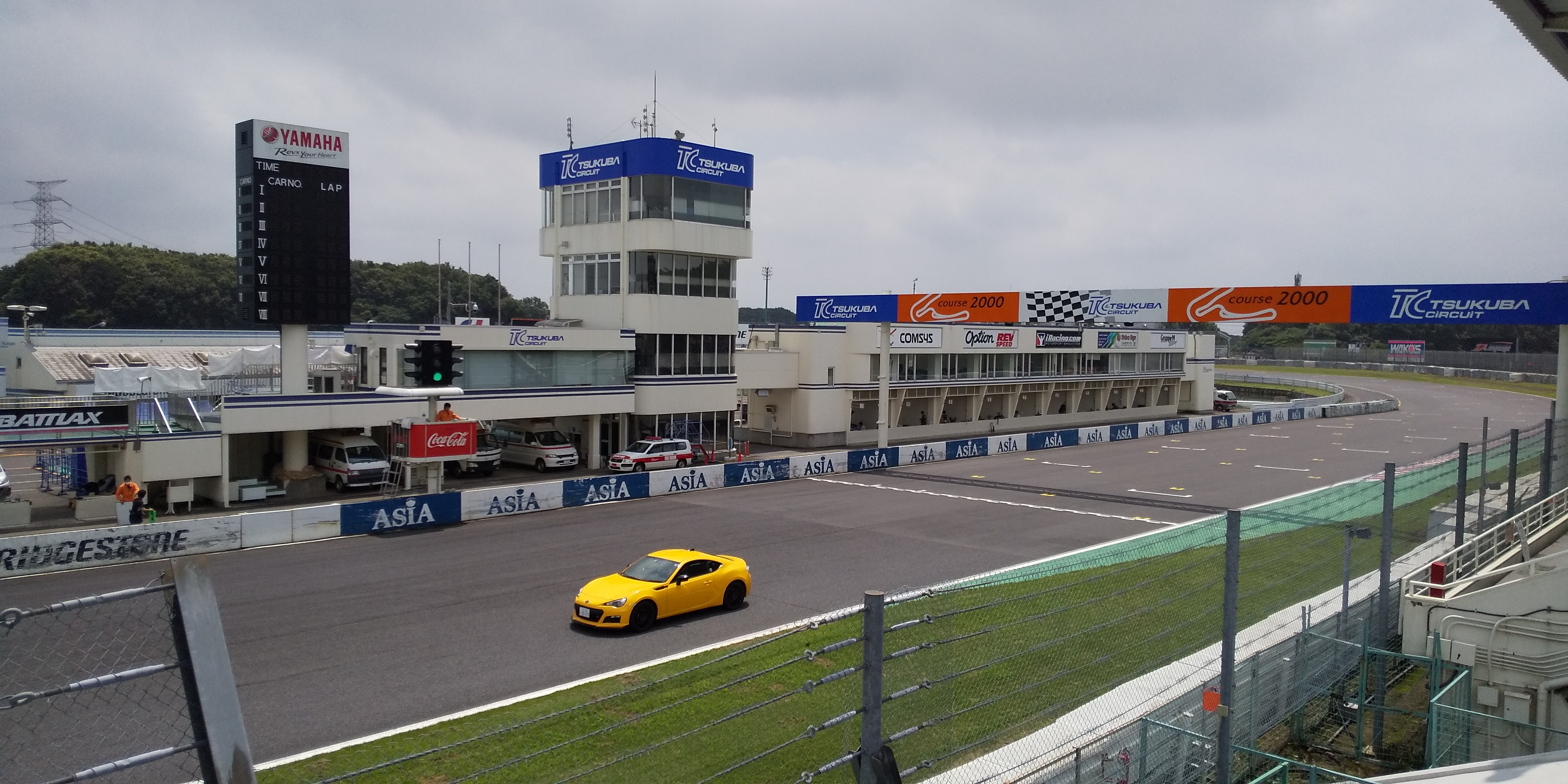
Track view at the Tsukuba Circuit, the site of Igata's accident.

In 1987 at age 30, Mari had an accident at Tsukuba while racing in the All Japan Road Race Championship. Coming into the final corner, she fell, breaking her femur and pelvis, and suffering internal organ damage. Igata had to relearn how to walk, and found riding a motorcycle painful. Despite efforts to return to racing, she eventually retired from competitive sport in 1990.

=== Team Mari ===
Eager to remain involved in motorsport while recovering, in 1988, Igata founded "Team Mari" a motorcycling school for women. It was the first motorcycle training school exclusively for women in Japan. The school has trained more than 16,000 women to ride, and has taught motorcyclists across Japan the principles of safe motorcycling. The school and training continues today, held in Saitama, Motegi, Suzuka and elsewhere in Japan where it has been supported by Honda Motorcycles and Bridgestone.

=== Later years ===
In 2003, Igata was diagnosed with myasthenia gravis. In 2004, due to worsening health issues, Igata's sister Tomo took over day-to-day management of Team Mari. She retired completely from her racing school in 2010. On 13 August 2024, Igata died suddenly of complications of myasthenia gravis at age 66.
