= 2016 Catalan motorcycle Grand Prix =

(Catalonia) 2016 Catalan Grand Prix
Race details
- Race 7 of 18 races in the 2016 Grand Prix motorcycle racing season
- Date: 5 June 2016
- Official name: Gran Premi Monster Energy de Catalunya
- Location: Circuit de Barcelona-Catalunya
- Course: Permanent racing facility; 4.655 (Note: 4.727 km (2.937 mi) for Friday practice sessions.) km (2.892 mi)

MotoGP
Pole position
Rider	(Spain) Marc Márquez	Honda
Time	1:43.589	
Fastest lap
Rider	(Spain) Maverick Viñales	Suzuki
Time	1:45.971 on lap 5	
Podium
First	(Italy) Valentino Rossi	Yamaha
Second	(Spain) Marc Márquez	Honda
Third	(Spain) Dani Pedrosa	Honda

Moto2
Pole position
Rider	(France) Johann Zarco	Kalex
Time	1:49.179	
Fastest lap
Rider	(France) Johann Zarco	Kalex
Time	1:49.968 on lap 2	
Podium
First	(France) Johann Zarco	Kalex
Second	(Spain) Álex Rins	Kalex
Third	(Japan) Takaaki Nakagami	Kalex

Moto3
Pole position
Rider	(South Africa) Brad Binder	KTM
Time	1:54.024	
Fastest lap
Rider	(Italy) Romano Fenati	KTM
Time	1:54.145 on lap 8	
Podium
First	(Spain) Jorge Navarro	Honda
Second	(South Africa) Brad Binder	KTM
Third	(Italy) Enea Bastianini	Honda

The 2016 Catalan motorcycle Grand Prix was the seventh round of the 2016 MotoGP season. It was held at the Circuit de Barcelona-Catalunya in Montmeló on 5 June 2016.

The weekend was overshadowed by the death of Moto2 rider Luis Salom, as he was killed in a crash at Europcar (motorcycle Turn 12) during Free Practice 2 on Friday, approximately 25 minutes before the end of the session. For the remainder of the weekend, the track layout was altered to use the configuration used by Formula One since 2007, in order to reduce speeds in the part of the circuit where Salom's accident occurred. The altered layout included the replacement of the long sweeping corner at La Caixa with a slower hairpin and the insertion of a chicane between Europcar (the penultimate turn) and New Holland (final turn).

Further adjustments were made to the circuit by safety officials following an evaluation conducted with a group of riders on Friday evening. The changes included narrowing the chicane by two metres on the outside, creating a gravel trap in the run-off area of the chicane and making the chicane a permanent yellow flag zone during the event. Following the 2016 season, the FIM, FIA and the circuit agreed to move the chicane up by a few metres for motorcycles. This modification, which was constructed for the 2017 winter testing season, added additional run-off areas for motorcycles and ease the entrance to pit lane. However, after the first practice of the 2017 race, the chicane was deemed dangerous and was reverted to the car chicane because of concerns over the surface change between the intended motorcycle and the car chicanes. Following the removal of seating in the area and additional runoff, the chicane will be eliminated in 2018.

This event also saw the end of the controversial rivalry between Valentino Rossi and Marc Márquez since it began at the 2015 Malaysian Grand Prix, when Rossi shook hands with Márquez at the parc fermé post-race. Rossi later said that the handshake was the right thing to do following Salom's death.

== Pre-race ==
Significant amounts of speculation concerning the top riders and their plans for 2017 culminated in a series of riders announcing their future teams. Marc Márquez confirmed he would partner teammate Dani Pedrosa for a further two seasons at Repsol Honda, while it was announced that Tech 3 pairing Bradley Smith and Pol Espargaró would move to the new factory KTM squad.

Following Maverick Viñales's previous confirmation alongside Valentino Rossi at Yamaha, and reigning champion Jorge Lorenzo's confirmed move to Ducati, the only factory seats remaining were those alongside Andrea Iannone and Sam Lowes at Suzuki and Aprilia respectively.

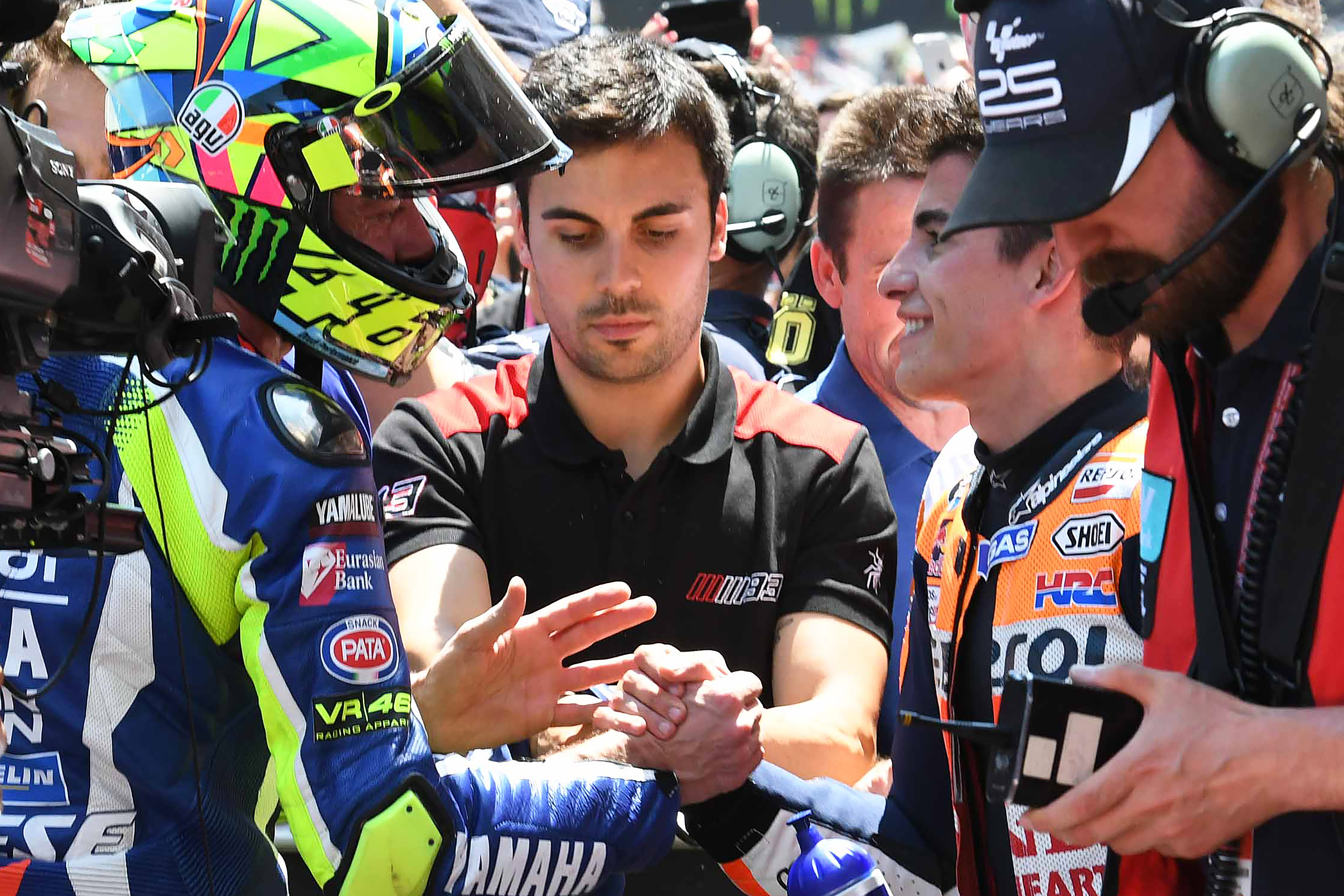
Valentino Rossi and Marc Márquez, congratulating each other after finishing first and second at the MotoGP race.

== Classification ==
=== MotoGP ===
Pos.	No.	Rider	Team	Manufacturer	Laps	Time/Retired	Grid	Points
1	46	(Italy) Valentino Rossi	Movistar Yamaha MotoGP	Yamaha	25	44:37.589	5	25
2	93	(Spain) Marc Márquez	Repsol Honda Team	Honda	25	+2.652	1	20
3	26	(Spain) Dani Pedrosa	Repsol Honda Team	Honda	25	+6.313	3	16
4	25	(Spain) Maverick Viñales	Team Suzuki Ecstar	Suzuki	25	+24.388	6	13
5	44	(Spain) Pol Espargaró	Monster Yamaha Tech 3	Yamaha	25	+29.546	12	11
6	35	(United Kingdom) Cal Crutchlow	LCR Honda	Honda	25	+36.244	7	10
7	4	(Italy) Andrea Dovizioso	Ducati Team	Ducati	25	+41.464	10	9
8	19	(Spain) Álvaro Bautista	Aprilia Racing Team Gresini	Aprilia	25	+42.975	21	8
9	9	(Italy) Danilo Petrucci	Octo Pramac Yakhnich	Ducati	25	+45.337	9	7
10	43	(Australia) Jack Miller	Estrella Galicia 0,0 Marc VDS	Honda	25	+49.514	19	6
11	8	(Spain) Héctor Barberá	Avintia Racing	Ducati	25	+46.669 (Note: 1-position penalty.)	4	5
12	6	(Germany) Stefan Bradl	Aprilia Racing Team Gresini	Aprilia	25	+55.133	18	4
13	50	(Republic of Ireland) Eugene Laverty	Aspar Team MotoGP	Ducati	25	+57.974	17	3
14	53	(Spain) Tito Rabat	Estrella Galicia 0,0 Marc VDS	Honda	25	+1:00.141	20	2
15	51	(Italy) Michele Pirro	Ducati Team	Ducati	25	+1:00.429	15	1
16	45	(United Kingdom) Scott Redding	Octo Pramac Yakhnich	Ducati	25	+1:16.269	11	
17	68	(Colombia) Yonny Hernández	Aspar Team MotoGP	Ducati	24	+1 lap	16	
Ret	41	(Spain) Aleix Espargaró	Team Suzuki Ecstar	Suzuki	18	Electronics	13	
Ret	99	(Spain) Jorge Lorenzo	Movistar Yamaha MotoGP	Yamaha	16	Collision	2	
Ret	29	(Italy) Andrea Iannone	Ducati Team	Ducati	16	Collision	8	
Ret	38	(United Kingdom) Bradley Smith	Monster Yamaha Tech 3	Yamaha	6	Engine	14	

=== Moto2 ===
Pos.	No.	Rider	Manufacturer	Laps	Time/Retired	Grid	Points
1	5	(France) Johann Zarco	Kalex	23	42:31.347	1	25
2	40	(Spain) Álex Rins	Kalex	23	+4.180	2	20
3	30	(Japan) Takaaki Nakagami	Kalex	23	+9.313	4	16
4	55	(Malaysia) Hafizh Syahrin	Kalex	23	+10.777	13	13
5	12	(Switzerland) Thomas Lüthi	Kalex	23	+10.961	3	11
6	22	(United Kingdom) Sam Lowes	Kalex	23	+13.000	5	10
7	94	(Germany) Jonas Folger	Kalex	23	+17.046	12	9
8	44	(Portugal) Miguel Oliveira	Kalex	23	+20.637	15	8
9	49	(Spain) Axel Pons	Kalex	23	+20.646	6	7
10	23	(Germany) Marcel Schrötter	Kalex	23	+23.163	9	6
11	21	(Italy) Franco Morbidelli	Kalex	23	+28.145	18	5
12	54	(Italy) Mattia Pasini	Kalex	23	+28.348	19	4
13	60	(Spain) Julián Simón	Speed Up	23	+34.482	17	3
14	7	(Italy) Lorenzo Baldassarri	Kalex	23	+37.567	8	2
15	87	(Australia) Remy Gardner	Kalex	23	+42.998	24	1
16	32	(Spain) Isaac Viñales	Tech 3	23	+44.632	27	
17	57	(Spain) Edgar Pons	Kalex	23	+48.536	25	
18	73	(Spain) Álex Márquez	Kalex	23	+51.046	7	
19	93	(Malaysia) Ramdan Rosli	Kalex	23	+1:22.466	28	
20	97	(Spain) Xavi Vierge	Tech 3	23	+1:25.462	22	
21	70	(Switzerland) Robin Mulhauser	Kalex	22	+1 lap	26	
Ret	14	(Thailand) Ratthapark Wilairot	Kalex	15	Accident Damage	23	
Ret	77	(Switzerland) Dominique Aegerter	Kalex	14	Engine	14	
Ret	10	(Italy) Luca Marini	Kalex	14	Accident Damage	20	
Ret	52	(United Kingdom) Danny Kent	Kalex	10	Brakes	21	
Ret	11	(Germany) Sandro Cortese	Kalex	5	Radiator Leak	10	
Ret	24	(Italy) Simone Corsi	Speed Up	2	Accident	11	
Ret	19	(Belgium) Xavier Siméon	Speed Up	1	Accident	16	
DNS	2	(Switzerland) Jesko Raffin	Kalex		Withdrew (Teammate's fatal crash)		
DNS	39	(Spain) Luis Salom	Kalex		FP2 fatal crash (Europcar)		
OFFICIAL MOTO2 REPORT

=== Moto3 ===
Pos.	No.	Rider	Manufacturer	Laps	Time/Retired	Grid	Points
1	9	(Spain) Jorge Navarro	Honda	22	42:18.228	3	25
2	41	(South Africa) Brad Binder	KTM	22	+0.564	1	20
3	33	(Italy) Enea Bastianini	Honda	22	+0.817	5	16
4	5	(Italy) Romano Fenati	KTM	22	+0.925	10	13
5	8	(Italy) Nicolò Bulega	KTM	22	+1.531	4	11
6	44	(Spain) Arón Canet	Honda	22	+1.581	9	10
7	20	(France) Fabio Quartararo	KTM	22	+13.605	12	9
8	36	(Spain) Joan Mir	KTM	22	+13.672	17	8
9	4	(Italy) Fabio Di Giannantonio	Honda	22	+13.753	18	7
10	84	(Czech Republic) Jakub Kornfeil	Honda	22	+14.814	15	6
11	64	(Netherlands) Bo Bendsneyder	KTM	22	+14.840	13	5
12	40	(South Africa) Darryn Binder	Mahindra	22	+29.860	30	4
13	58	(Spain) Juan Francisco Guevara	KTM	22	+32.006	21	3
14	24	(Japan) Tatsuki Suzuki	Mahindra	22	+33.305	24	2
15	17	(United Kingdom) John McPhee	Peugeot	22	+33.766	26	1
16	11	(Belgium) Livio Loi	Honda	22	+34.986	20	
17	65	(Germany) Philipp Öttl	KTM	22	+36.384	28	
18	16	(Italy) Andrea Migno	KTM	22	+41.731	14	
19	55	(Italy) Andrea Locatelli	KTM	22	+42.985	23	
20	23	(Italy) Niccolò Antonelli	Honda	22	+59.035	2	
21	3	(Italy) Fabio Spiranelli	Mahindra	22	+1:29.713	35	
22	77	(Italy) Lorenzo Petrarca	Mahindra	22	+1:30.640	34	
Ret	98	(Czech Republic) Karel Hanika	Mahindra	21	Accident	31	
Ret	37	(Italy) Davide Pizzoli	KTM	21	Accident	29	
Ret	19	(Argentina) Gabriel Rodrigo	KTM	20	Accident	19	
Ret	89	(Malaysia) Khairul Idham Pawi	Honda	19	Accident	6	
Ret	88	(Spain) Jorge Martín	Mahindra	16	Accident	22	
Ret	12	(Spain) Albert Arenas	Mahindra	13	Accident	16	
Ret	21	(Italy) Francesco Bagnaia	Mahindra	5	Accident	7	
Ret	7	(Malaysia) Adam Norrodin	Honda	5	Accident Damage	25	
Ret	76	(Japan) Hiroki Ono	Honda	3	Accident	11	
Ret	95	(France) Jules Danilo	Honda	3	Accident	8	
Ret	6	(Spain) María Herrera	KTM	2	Accident	27	
Ret	43	(Italy) Stefano Valtulini	Mahindra	2	Accident Damage	32	
Ret	10	(France) Alexis Masbou	Peugeot	0	Accident	33	
OFFICIAL MOTO3 REPORT

== Championship standings after the race (MotoGP) ==
Below are the standings for the top five riders and constructors after round seven has concluded.

Riders' Championship standings

Pos.	Rider	Points
1	(Spain) Marc Marquez	125
2	(Spain) Jorge Lorenzo	115
3	(Italy) Valentino Rossi	103
4	(Spain) Dani Pedrosa	82
5	(Spain) Maverick Vinales	72

Constructors' Championship standings

Pos.	Constructor	Points
1	(Japan) Yamaha	165
2	(Japan) Honda	135
3	(Italy) Ducati	92
4	(Japan) Suzuki	78
5	(Italy) Aprilia	37

- Note: Only the top five positions are included for both sets of standings.

== Notes ==
Previous race: 2016 Italian Grand Prix	FIM Grand Prix World Championship; 2016 season	Next race: 2016 Dutch TT
Previous race: 2015 Catalan Grand Prix	Catalan motorcycle Grand Prix	Next race: 2017 Catalan Grand Prix
