= Kazuma Watanabe (motorcyclist) =

Japanese motorcycle racer

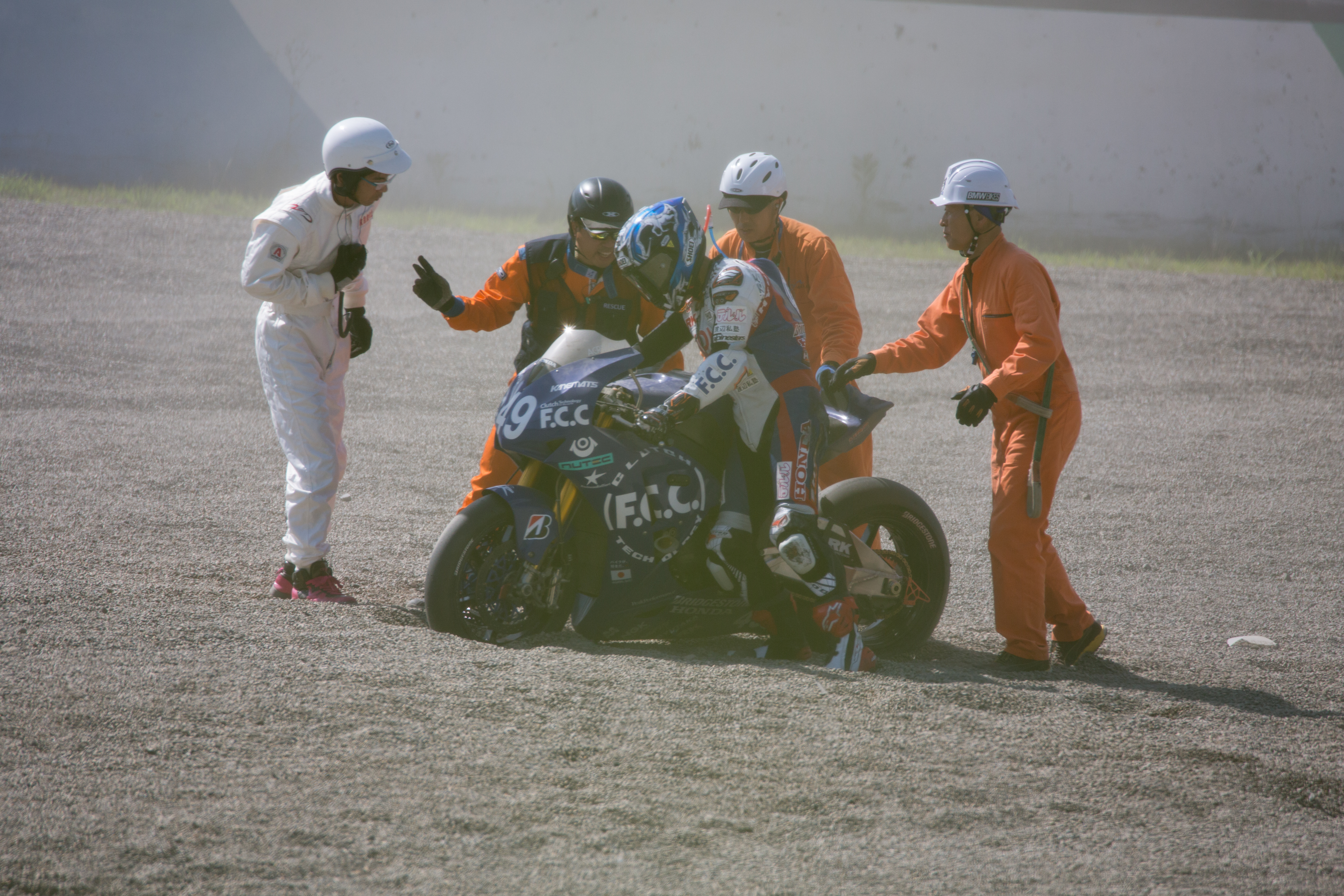
- Watanabe in 2016
- Nationality: Japanese
- Born: 6 May 1990 (age 36); Tochigi, Japan
- Current team: Astemo Honda Dream SIRacing
- Bike number: 11
Motorcycle racing career statistics
125cc World Championship
Active years	2006–2008
Manufacturers	Honda
Starts / Wins / Podiums / Poles / F. laps / Points; 5 / 0 / 0 / 0 / 0 / 0

Kazuma Watanabe (渡辺 一馬, Watanabe Kazuma; born 6 May 1990) is a Japanese motorcycle racer, competing in the All Japan Road Race JSB1000 Championship aboard a Kawasaki ZX-10R. He has competed in the GP125 and J-GP2 classes of the All Japan Road Race Championship, as well as in the ST600 class, where he was champion in 2013.

== Career statistics ==
=== Grand Prix motorcycle racing ===
==== By season ====
Season	Class	Motorcycle	Race	Win	Podium	Pole	FLap	Pts	Plcd
2006	125cc	Honda	3	0	0	0	0	0	NC
2007	125cc	Honda	1	0	0	0	0	0	NC
2008	125cc	Honda	1	0	0	0	0	0	NC
Total			**5**	**0**	**0**	**0**	**0**	**0**	

==== Races by year ====
Year	Class	Bike	1	2	3	4	5	6	7	8	9	10	11	12	13	14	15	16	17	Pos.	Points
2006	125cc	Honda	SPA	QAT	TUR	CHN	FRA	ITA	CAT	NED	GBR	GER	CZE	MAL	AUS	JPN; Ret	POR; 20	VAL; 30		NC	0
2007	125cc	Honda	QAT	SPA	TUR	CHN	FRA	ITA	CAT	GBR	NED	GER	CZE	RSM	POR	JPN; 18	AUS	MAL	VAL	NC	0
2008	125cc	Honda	QAT	SPA	POR	CHN	FRA	ITA	CAT	GBR	NED	GER	CZE	RSM	INP	JPN; Ret	AUS	MAL	VAL	NC	0

=== All Japan Road Race Championship ===
==== Races by year ====
(key) (Races in bold indicate pole position; races in italics indicate fastest lap)

Year	Class	Bike	1	2	3	4	5	6	7	8	9	10	11	Pos	Pts
2024	JSB1000	Honda	SUZ; 13	MOT1	MOT2	SUG1	SUG2	MOT	AUT1	AUT2	OKA	SUZ1	SUZ2	26th	3
