= Sonoma County Fairgrounds =

Fairground in Santa Rosa, California

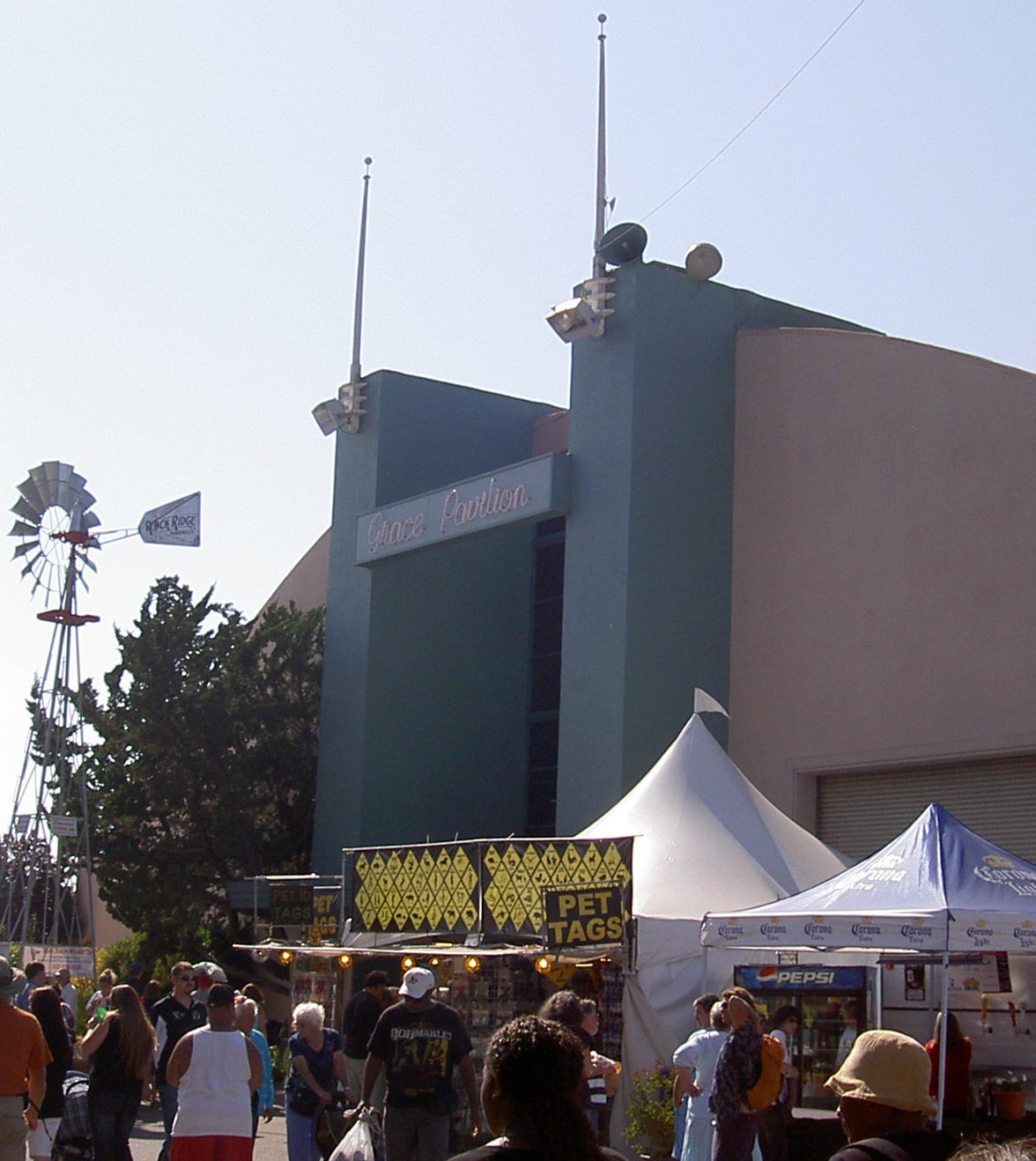
Grace Pavilion at the Sonoma County Fairgrounds

The Sonoma County Fairgrounds is a fairground and exhibition center located in Santa Rosa, California. It is where the annual Sonoma County fair takes place and other events throughout the year.

== History ==
Historically, the fairgrounds have held horse races. Racing at the fairgrounds started in 1936. The Gravenstein Apple Show Classic was held at the fairgrounds, as part of the Sonoma County Fair, until 1938.

== Facilities ==
The fairgrounds feature a horse-racing track and jockey club, a golf course, several open-air amphitheaters, and multiple buildings. The largest hall at the fairgrounds is Grace Pavilion (38.4323°N 122.7014°W), a 40,500-square-foot (3,760 m^{2}) indoor arena which can seat 4,400 people. It houses exhibits during the fair and is used throughout the year for concerts, fights, and other events.

== Annual events ==
There are a number of annual events that take place at the fairgrounds, including the Sonoma County Fair. The fair takes place each July, and participants experience music, carnival rides, farm animals, food, and horse races. The Sonoma Valley Harvest Fair is a wine festival. It takes place each October, and attendees can partake in Sonoma wine and food. It also has a grape stomping contest. The Harmony Festival, which is in June, is a new age festival with psychics, food, and music. Starting in 2013, the Emerald Cup, an "organic cannabis competition", started taking place at the fairgrounds, moving from its original location in Mendocino.
