= Norman Brown (motorcyclist) =

Professional motorcycle racer from Northern Ireland

- Nationality: Northern Irish
- Born: 16 March 1959
- Died: 31 July 1983 (aged 24)
Motorcycle racing career statistics
Isle of Man TT career
TTs contested	2 (1982-1983)
TT wins	1
First TT win	1982 Senior TT
TT podiums	3

Norman Brown Jr. (16 March 1959 – 31 July 1983) was an Irish professional motorcycle road racer from Northern Ireland.

== Biography ==
Brown was born in Newry, County Down, Northern Ireland, where his father, Norman Brown Sr., ran a public house, "The Star Bar" or "Brown's Bar", overlooking the Clanrye River and Newry Town Hall. An alumnus of Newry High School, Brown Jr. started racing at the Isle of Man TT in 1982, and won the Senior TT at his first attempt. In 1983, he raised the TT lap record to 116.19 mph in the Senior Classic event for machines up to 1000cc. Brown also won the 350cc class at the 1983 North West 200 race in Northern Ireland.

== Death ==
Brown was killed during the 1983 British Grand Prix at Silverstone on 31 July 1983. When it began to rain he slowed, apparently due to mechanical problems. With greatly reduced speed he continued the lap to reach the pits. After exiting the Stowe corner he held to the inside line and was passed by multiple riders before being hit by Swiss rider Peter Huber, whose view was obscured by the riders in front of him. Brown died instantly and Huber later died at the hospital.
