= All Japan Road Race Championship =

Motorcycle road racing championship

- Category: Motorcycle sport
- Country: Japan
- Inaugural season: 1967
- Tyre suppliers: Dunlop, Bridgestone, Pirelli
- Riders' champion: (Japan) Ryo Mizuno (JSB1000)
- Official website: Official website

The All Japan Road Race Championship (Japanese: 全日本ロードレース選手権, Hepburn: Zen Nihon Rōdo Rēsu Senshuken) is the premiere motorcycle road racing championship in Japan. It is run by the Motorcycle Federation of Japan (MFJ) (日本モーターサイクルスポーツ協会) – the Japanese affiliate of the FIM.

== History ==
The MFJ was formed in 1961 and held its first motorcycle road race in 1967.

The Championship's premiere class for a number of years had been the 500cc class but it was replaced by a superbike class in 1994. During the 2002 season the championship was used by some manufacturers to test their MotoGP prototypes. The prototypes usually won the races but were not eligible for points. The series now runs a small seven round schedule but has a large field of Japanese riders and bikes. Similar to Spain's CEV championship, Moto3 motorcycles are used in Japan.

== Current classes ==
=== JSB1000 ===
The motorcycles used are primarily based on 1000cc commercial road sport models, modified into full race-spec machines. Since the 2023 season, the class has been using the carbon-neutral racing fuel ETS Renewa Blaze NIHON R100. The manufacturers usually involved are Honda, Kawasaki, Suzuki, Yamaha, Aprilia, BMW and Ducati. They use specs similar to those used in the Endurance World Championship, the top category of the Suzuka 8 Hours endurance race and the Superbike World Championship.

Tyre suppliers vary from Dunlop to Bridgestone.

=== ST1000 ===
Like in the JSB1000, the motorcycles are based on commercially available road sport models with 1000cc engines, but the range of modifications allowed for racing is extremely limited, making them much closer to stock. The manufacturers involved are the same ones from JSB1000. The machines align with the SST class regulations used in the Suzuka 8 Hours endurance race, which is part of the Endurance World Championship.

All teams use series-specified Dunlop tyres.

=== ST600 ===
The motorcycles used are primarily based on 600cc commercial road sport models. Like in ST1000, the range of modifications allowed for racing use is very limited. Honda and Yamaha are the main manufacturers in the class.

All teams use series-specified Bridgestone tyres.

=== J-GP3 ===
The motorcycles used are prototype-based machines, the Honda NSF250R and KTM RC250R. The machines conform to the specifications of the Moto3™ class in the MotoGP™ World Championship.

Tyre suppliers vary from Dunlop, Bridgestone and Pirelli.

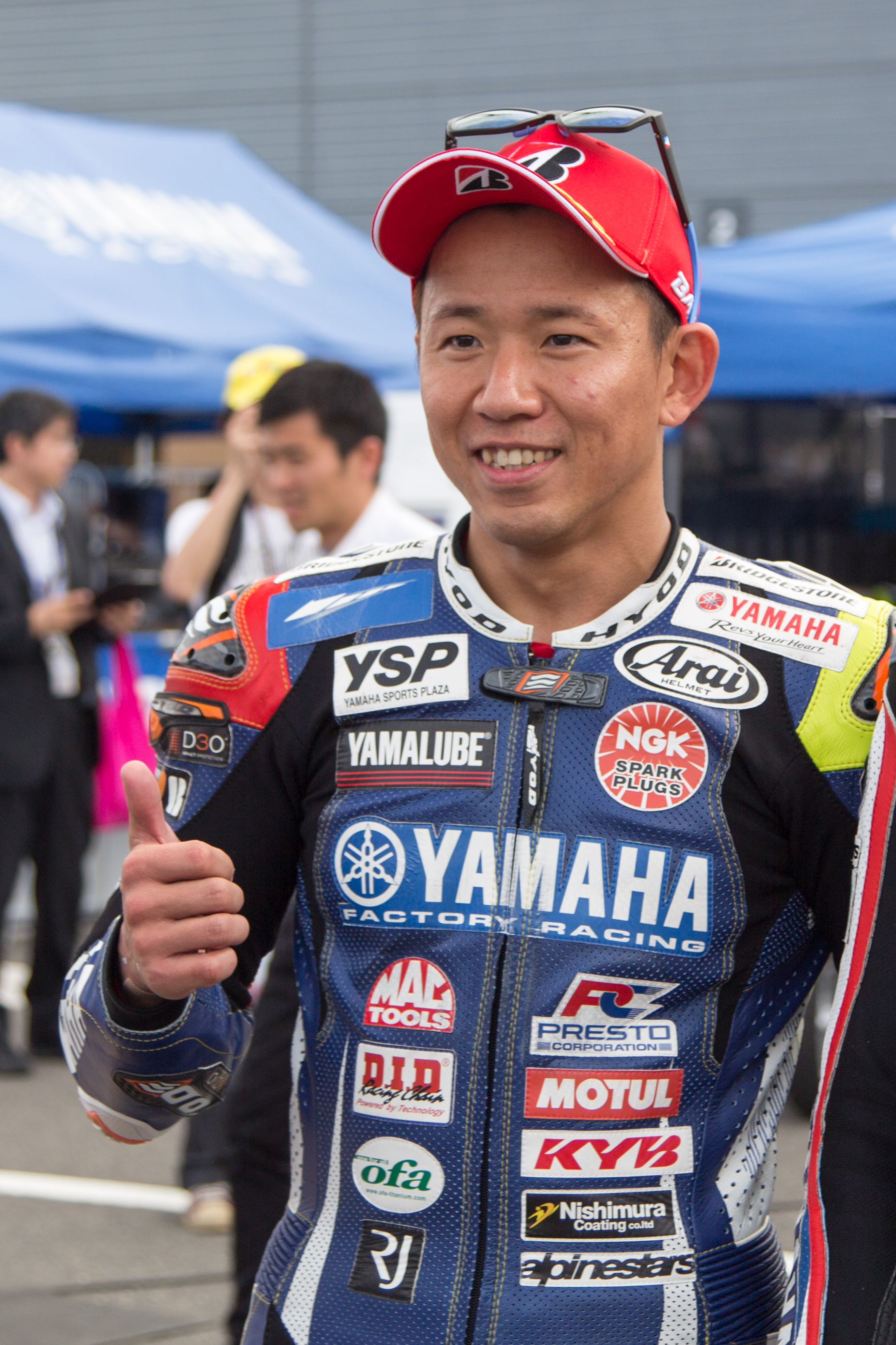
Katsuyuki Nakasuga holds the most JSB1000 titles in the history of the All Japan Road Race Championship, with 13 championships as of 2025.

== Champions ==
| Year | 50 cm^{3} | 90 cm^{3} | 125 cm^{3} | 250 cm^{3} | over 250 cm^{3} |
|---|---|---|---|---|---|
| 1967 | Mitsuo Itoh | Yasunori Shigeno | Tsunehiro Masuda | Keiji Yano | Takashi Matsunaga |
| 1968 | | Yoshiaki Kamiya | Tadao Baba | Masahiro Wada | Takashi Matsunaga |
| 1969 | | Yutaka Oda | Morio Sumiya | Hideo Kanaya | Morio Sumiya |
| 1970 | | Eiji Kondoh | Yutaka Oda | Toshio Ohwaki | Hiroyuki Kawasaki |
| 1971 | | Hideo Kanaya | Izumi Sugimoto | Toshio Ohwaki | Hideo Kanaya |
| 1972 | | | Yutaka Oda | | Yutaka Oda |
| Year | 125 cm^{3} | 250 cm^{3} | 350 cm^{3} | 500 cm^{3} | 750 cm^{3} |
| 1973 | Shinji Sumiya | | | | Ken Nemoto |
| 1974 | Tatsumi Aoki | | | | Ikujiro Takaï |
| 1975 | Tadashi Ezaki | | | | Tadao Asami |
| 1976 | | Yoshikazu Mouri | Junzoh Satoh | | Ikujiro Takaï |
| 1977 | Hiroyuki Iida | | Osamu Suzuki | | Yoshikazu Mouri |
| 1978 | Koji Ueda | Koji Ueda | Iwao Ishikawa | | Shin'ichi Ueno |
| 1979 | Mitsuo Saitoh | | Keiji Kinoshita | | Masaru Mizutani |
| 1980 | Noriaki Ichinose | | Tadahiko Taira | | Osamu Suzuki |
| 1981 | Noriaki Ichinose | | Yasuaki Fujimoto | Keiji Kinoshita | |
| Year | 125 cm^{3} | 250 cm^{3} | 500 cm^{3} | TT-F1 | TT-F3 |
| 1982 | Noriaki Ichinose | Teruo Fukuda | Masaru Mizutani | | |
| 1983 | Jiroh Kuriya (Honda) | Mitsuo Saito (Yamaha) | Tadahiko Taira (Yamaha) | | |
| 1984 | Jiroh Kuriya (Honda) | Masaru Kobayashi (Honda) | Tadahiko Taira (Yamaha) | Shunji Yatusushiro (Honda) | Tadashi Ezaki (Yamaha) |
| 1985 | Hisashi Unemoto (Honda) | Masaru Kobayashi (Honda) | Tadahiko Taira (Yamaha) | Satoshi Tsujimoto (Suzuki) | Yoichi Yamamoto (Honda) |
| 1986 | Kenichi Yoshida (Honda) | Shinji Katayama (Yamaha) | Keiji Kinoshita (Honda) | Satoshi Tsujimoto (Suzuki) | Yoichi Yamamoto |
| 1987 | Hisashi Unemoto (Honda) | Masahiro Shimizu (Honda) | Norihiko Fujiwara (Yamaha) | Yukiya Ohshima (Suzuki) | Masumitsu Taguchi |
| 1988 | Masayuki Hirose (Honda) | Toshihiko Honma (Yamaha) | Norihiko Fujiwara (Yamaha) | Shoji Miyazaki (Honda) | Toshinobu Shiomori (Yamaha) |
| 1989 | Fuyuki Yamazaki (Honda) | Tadayuki Okada (Honda) | Norihiko Fujiwara (Yamaha) | (United States) Doug Polen (Suzuki) | (United States) Doug Polen (Suzuki) |
| 1990 | Kazuto Sakata (Honda) | Tadayuki Okada (Honda) | Shinichi Ito (Honda) | Ken'ichiro Iwahashi (Honda) | Ryuji Tsuruta (Kawasaki) |
| 1991 | Masafumi Ono (Honda) | Tadayuki Okada (Honda) | (Australia) Peter Goddard (Yamaha) | Shoji Miyazaki (Honda) | Katsuyoshi Takahashi (Yamaha) |
| 1992 | Akira Saito (Honda) | Tetsuya Harada (Yamaha) | (Australia) Daryl Beattie (Honda) | Shoichi Tsukamoto (Kawasaki) | |
| 1993 | Yoshiaki Katoh (Yamaha) | Tohru Ukawa (Honda) | Norick Abe (Honda) | Keiichi Kitagawa (Kawasaki) | |
| Year | 125 cm^{3} | 250 cm^{3} | Superbike | S-NK | Superstock 600 |
| 1994 | Ken Miyasaka (Honda) | Tohru Ukawa (Honda) | Wataru Yoshikawa (Yamaha) | | |
| 1995 | Youichi Ui (Yamaha) | Noriyasu Numata (Suzuki) | Takuma Aoki (Honda) | | |
| 1996 | Masao Azuma (Honda) | Noriyasu Numata (Suzuki) | Takuma Aoki (Honda) | | |
| 1997 | Takashi Akita (Yamaha) | Daijiro Kato (Honda) | Noriyuki Haga (Yamaha) | | |
| 1998 | Hideyuki Nakajoh (Honda) | Shinya Nakano (Yamaha) | Shinichi Ito (Honda) | | |
| 1999 | Hideyuki Nakajoh (Honda) | Naoki Matsudo (Yamaha) | Wataru Yoshikawa (Yamaha) | Manabu Kamada (Suzuki) | |
| 2000 | Tomoyoshi Koyama (Yamaha) | Shinichi Nakatomi (Honda) | Hitoyasu Izutsu (Kawasaki) | Ryuji Tsuruta (Kawasaki) | |
| 2001 | Hideyuki Nakajoh (Honda) | Taro Sekiguchi (Yamaha) | Akira Ryo (Suzuki) | Keiichi Kitagawa (Suzuki) | Yuichi Takeda (Honda) |
| Year | 125 cm^{3} | 250 cm^{3} | Superbike | JSB/S-NK | Superstock 600 |
| 2002 | Hideyuki Nakajoh (Honda) | Tekkyu Kayoh (Yamaha) | Atsushi Watanabe (Suzuki) | Tatsuya Yamaguchi (Honda) | Ryuichi Kiyonari (Honda) |
| Year | 125 cm^{3} | 250 cm^{3} | JSB1000 | GP-Mono | Superstock 600 |
| 2003 | Shuhei Aoyama (Honda) | Hiroshi Aoyama (Honda) | Keiichi Kitagawa (Suzuki) | | Yoshiteru Konishi (Honda) |
| 2004 | Hideyuki Nakajoh (Honda) | Yuki Takahashi (Honda) | Hitoyasu Izutsu (Honda) | | Takeshi Tsujimura (Honda) |
| 2005 | Hiroyuki Kikuchi (Honda) | Shuhei Aoyama (Honda) | Shinichi Ito (Honda) | | Takashi Yasuda (Honda) |
| 2006 | Takaaki Nakagami (Honda) | Ryuji Yokoe (Yamaha) | Shinichi Ito (Honda) | Tasuku Yamashita(Yamaha) | Takashi Yasuda (Honda) |
| 2007 | Hiroomi Iwata (Honda) | Youichi Ui (Yamaha) | Atsushi Watanabe (Suzuki) | Takayoshi Mori (Honda) | Yoshiteru Konishi (Honda) |
| 2008 | Hiroyuki Kikuchi (Honda) | Takumi Takahashi (Honda) | Katsuyuki Nakasuga (Yamaha) | Yasutomo Nomura (Honda) | Yoshiteru Konishi (Honda) |
| 2009 | Hiroyuki Kikuchi (Honda) | Youichi Ui (Yamaha) | Katsuyuki Nakasuga (Yamaha) | Kazuki Hanafusa (Yamaha) | Yusuke Teshima (Honda) |
| Year | J-GP3 | J-GP2 | JSB1000 | GP-Mono | Superstock 600 |
| 2010 | Hikari Okubo (Honda) | Yoshiteru Konishi (Honda) | Kousuke Akiyoshi (Honda) | Kenta Fujii (Honda) | Tatsuya Yamaguchi (Honda) |
| 2011 | Kenta Fujii (Honda) | Takaaki Nakagami (Honda) | Kousuke Akiyoshi (Honda) | Tetsuta Nagashima (Honda) | Tatsuya Yamaguchi (Honda) |
| 2012 | Masaki Tokudome (Honda) | Kazuki Watanabe (Kawasaki) | Katsuyuki Nakasuga (Yamaha) | | (Thailand) Decha Kraisart (Yamaha) |
| 2013 | Sena Yamada (Honda) | Kohta Nozane (Honda) | Katsuyuki Nakasuga (Yamaha) | | Kazuma Watanabe (Honda) |
| 2014 | Sena Yamada (Honda) | Yuki Takahashi (Moriwaki) | Katsuyuki Nakasuga (Yamaha) | | Ryuta Kobayashi (Honda) |
| 2015 | Ryo Mizuno (Honda) | Yuki Takahashi (Moriwaki) | Katsuyuki Nakasuga (Yamaha) | | Ryuji Yokoe (Yamaha) |
| 2016 | Masaki Tokudome (Honda) | Naomichi Uramoto (Suzuki) | Katsuyuki Nakasuga (Yamaha) | | Ikuhiro Enokido (Honda) |
| 2017 | Yuta Date (Honda) | Ryo Mizuno (HARC-PRO) | Takumi Takahashi (Honda) | | Keisuke Maeda (Yamaha) |
| 2018 | Genki Nakajima (Honda) | Ryosuke Iwato (Moriwaki) | Katsuyuki Nakasuga (Yamaha) | | Yuki Okamoto (Yamaha) |
| 2019 | Sho Hasegawa (Honda) | Teppei Nagoe (HARC-PRO) | Katsuyuki Nakasuga (Yamaha) | | Tomoyoshi Koyama (Honda) |
| Year | J-GP3 (Moto3) | Superstock 1000 | JSB1000 (Superbike) | | Superstock 600 |
| 2020 | Takeru Murase (Honda) | Yuki Takahashi (Honda) | Kohta Nozane (Yamaha) | | Yuki Okamoto (Yamaha) |
| 2021 | Hiroki Ono (Honda) | Kazuma Watanabe (Honda) | Katsuyuki Nakasuga (Yamaha) | | Haruki Noguchi (Honda) |
| 2022 | Hiroki Ono (Honda) | Kazuma Watanabe (Honda) | Katsuyuki Nakasuga (Yamaha) | | Kohta Arakawa (Honda) |
| 2023 | Hiroki Ono (Honda) | Kazuma Watanabe (Honda) | Katsuyuki Nakasuga (Yamaha) | | Keito Abe (Yamaha) |
| 2024 | Hiroki Ono (Honda) | Yuki Kunii (Honda) | Yuki Okamoto (Yamaha) | | Keito Abe (Yamaha) |
| 2025 | Hiroki Ono (Honda) | Taiga Hada (Honda) | Katsuyuki Nakasuga (Yamaha) | | Yuta Date (Yamaha) |
| 2026 | Shingo Iidaka (Honda) | Takuma Kunimine (Honda) | Ryo Mizuno (Ducati) | | Rei Matsuoka (Yamaha) |
