= 2021 Brazilian Superbike Championship =

The 2021 Brazilian Superbike Championship is the 13th edition of the Brazilian Superbike Championship.

== Calendar ==
Round	Date	Circuit	City
1	May 30	Autódromo Internacional de Interlagos	São Paulo, SP
2	June 20	Autódromo Internacional de Interlagos	São Paulo, SP
3	July 25	Autódromo Internacional de Interlagos	São Paulo, SP
4	August 22	Autódromo Internacional de Interlagos	São Paulo, SP
5	September 26	Autódromo Ayrton Senna	Goiânia, GO
6	October 31	Autódromo Internacional de Curitiba	Curitiba, PR
7	November 21	Autódromo Internacional Potenza	Lima Duarte, MG
8	December 19	Autódromo Internacional de Interlagos	São Paulo, SP

== Results ==
=== Superbike ===
Round	Circuit	Date	Pole position	Fastest lap	Winning rider	Winning team	Winning constructor	Ref.
1	(São Paulo (state)) Autódromo Internacional de Interlagos	May 30	(Brazil) Pedro Sampaio	(Brazil) Leonardo Tamburro	(Brazil) Pedro Sampaio	(Brazil) RXP/TRH Racing	(Japan) Honda	
2	(São Paulo (state)) Autódromo Internacional de Interlagos	June 20	(Brazil) Pedro Sampaio	(Brazil) Pedro Sampaio	(Brazil) Pedro Sampaio	(Brazil) RXP/TRH Racing	(Japan) Honda	
3	(São Paulo (state)) Autódromo Internacional de Interlagos	July 25	(Brazil) Pedro Sampaio	(Brazil) Pedro Sampaio	(Brazil) Leonardo Tamburro	(Brazil) JC Racing Team	(Japan) Kawasaki	
4	(São Paulo (state)) Autódromo Internacional de Interlagos	August 22	(Brazil) Pedro Sampaio	(Brazil) Pedro Sampaio	(Brazil) Pedro Sampaio	(Brazil) RXP/TRH Racing	(Japan) Honda	
5	(Goiás) Autódromo Ayrton Senna	September 26	(Brazil) Pedro Sampaio	(Brazil) Pedro Sampaio	(Brazil) Pedro Sampaio	(Brazil) RXP/TRH Racing	(Japan) Honda	
6	(Paraná (state)) Autódromo Internacional de Curitiba	October 31	(Brazil) Pedro Sampaio	(Brazil) Danilo Lewis	(Brazil) Danilo Lewis	(Brazil) Tecfil Racing Team	(Germany) BMW	
7	(Minas Gerais) Autódromo Internacional Potenza	November 21	(Brazil) Danilo Lewis	(Brazil) Danilo Lewis	(Brazil) Danilo Lewis	(Brazil) Tecfil Racing Team	(Germany) BMW	
8	(São Paulo (state)) Autódromo Internacional de Interlagos	December 19	(Brazil) Danilo Lewis	(Brazil) Pedro Sampaio	(Brazil) Danilo Lewis	(Brazil) Tecfil Racing Team	(Germany) BMW	

=== Superbike Pro Master ===
Ronda	Circuito	Fecha	Pole Position	Vuelta rápida	Piloto ganador	Equipo ganador	Constructor	Ref.
1	(São Paulo (state)) Grande Prêmio de São Paulo	28 de mayo	(Brazil) Matheus Andreas	(Brazil) Matheus Andreas	(Brazil) Matheus Andreas	(Brazil) Boettger Racing	(Austria) KTM	
2	(São Paulo (state)) Grande Prêmio Petrobras	18 de junio	(Brazil) Alex Barros	(Uruguay) Solano Silva	(Brazil) Mauri Grando	(Austria) Red Bull KTM Racing	(Austria) KTM	
3	(São Paulo (state)) Grande Prêmio Elf	23 de julio	(Brazil) Fernando Medeiros	(Brazil) Alex Barros	(Brazil) Alex Barros	(Brazil) Alex Barros Racing	(Germany) BMW	
4	(São Paulo (state)) Grande Prêmio Suhai	22 de agosto	(Brazil) Alex Barros	(Brazil) Alex Barros	(Brazil) Alex Barros	(Brazil) Alex Barros Racing	(Germany) BMW	
5	(Goiás) Grande Prêmio de Goiânia	24 de septiembre	(Brazil) Alex Barros	(Brazil) Marcelo Machado	(Brazil) Alex Barros	(Brazil) Alex Barros Racing	(Germany) BMW	
6	(Paraná (state)) Grande Prêmio de Curitiba	28 de octubre	(Brazil) Mauri Grando	(Brazil) Fabiano Mazzochin	(Brazil) Mauri Grando	(Austria) Red Bull KTM Racing	(Austria) KTM	
7	Grande Prêmio de Minas Gerais	18 de noviembre	(Brazil) Alex Barros	(Brazil) Alex Barros	(Argentina) Emiliano Bogado	(Austria) Red Bull KTM Racing	(Austria) KTM	
8	(São Paulo (state)) Grande Prêmio de Interlagos	16 de diciembre	(Argentina) Federico Boasso	(Argentina) Federico Boasso	(Argentina) Federico Boasso	Yamaha Motor Argentina Racing	(Japan) Yamaha	

=== Superbike Light ===
Ronda	Circuito	Fecha	Pole Position	Vuelta rápida	Piloto ganador	Equipo ganador	Constructor	Ref.
1	(São Paulo (state)) Grande Prêmio de São Paulo	28 de mayo	(Brazil) André Veríssimo	(Brazil) Joelsu Mitiko	(Brazil) André Veríssimo	(Brazil) PSBK Racing	(Japan) Kawasaki	
2	(São Paulo (state)) Grande Prêmio Petrobras	18 de junio	(Brazil) Joelsu Mitiko	(Brazil) Joelsu Mitiko	(Brazil) Joelsu Mitiko	(Brazil) Controllity Racing	(Japan) Kawasaki	
3	(São Paulo (state)) Grande Prêmio Elf	23 de julio	(Brazil) Joelsu Mitiko	(Brazil) Joelsu Mitiko	(Brazil) Joelsu Mitiko	(Brazil) Controllity Racing	(Japan) Kawasaki	
4	(São Paulo (state)) Grande Prêmio Suhai	22 de agosto	(Brazil) Joelsu Mitiko	(Brazil) Joelsu Mitiko	(Brazil) André Veríssimo	(Brazil) PSBK Racing	(Japan) Kawasaki	
5	(Goiás) Grande Prêmio de Goiânia	24 de septiembre	(Brazil) Raphael Santos	(Brazil) Manow Martins	(Brazil) Rodrigo Dazzi	(Brazil) Ello Racing	(Germany) BMW	
6	(Paraná (state)) Grande Prêmio de Curitiba	28 de octubre	(Brazil) Juliano Ferrante	(Brazil) Joelsu Mitiko	(Brazil) Joelsu Mitiko	(Brazil) Controllity Racing	(Japan) Kawasaki	
7	Grande Prêmio de Minas Gerais	18 de noviembre	(Brazil) Felipe Macan	(Brazil) Felipe Macan	(Brazil) Felipe Macan	(Brazil) Controllity Racing	(Japan) Kawasaki	
8	(São Paulo (state)) Grande Prêmio de Interlagos	16 de diciembre	(Brazil) Danilo Brun	(Brazil) Danilo Brun	(Brazil) Joelsu Mitiko	(Brazil) Controllity Racing	(Japan) Kawasaki	

=== Supersport 600 ===
Ronda	Circuito	Fecha	Pole Position	Vuelta rápida	Piloto ganador	Equipo ganador	Constructor	Ref.
1	(São Paulo (state)) Grande Prêmio de São Paulo	28 de mayo	(Brazil) Gustavo Manso	(Brazil) Ives Moraes	(Brazil) Ives Moraes	(Brazil) Motom	(England) Triumph	
2	(São Paulo (state)) Grande Prêmio Petrobras	18 de junio	(Brazil) Diego Viveiros	(Brazil) Diego Viveiros	(Brazil) Diego Viveiros	(Brazil) Dual Sports Performance	(Japan) Kawasaki	
3	(São Paulo (state)) Grande Prêmio Elf	23 de julio	(Brazil) Théo Manna	(Brazil) Théo Manna	(Brazil) Lucas Torres	(Brazil) PKM Racing	(Japan) Kawasaki	
4	(São Paulo (state)) Grande Prêmio Suhai	22 de agosto	(Brazil) Théo Manna	(Brazil) Lucas Torres	(Brazil) Gustavo Manso	(Brazil) Dezeró Racing	(Japan) Kawasaki	
5	(Goiás) Grande Prêmio de Goiânia	24 de septiembre	(Brazil) Gustavo Manso	(Brazil) Pedro Kamikaze	(Brazil) Gustavo Manso	(Brazil) Dezeró Racing	(Japan) Kawasaki	
6	(Paraná (state)) Grande Prêmio de Curitiba	28 de octubre	(Brazil) Lucas Torres	(Brazil) Lucas Torres	(Brazil) Lucas Torres	(Brazil) PRT	(Japan) Kawasaki	
7	Grande Prêmio de Minas Gerais	18 de noviembre	(Uruguay) Sebastian Alonso	(Brazil) Hebert Pereira	(Brazil) Gustavo Manso	(Brazil) Dezeró Racing	(Japan) Kawasaki	
8	(São Paulo (state)) Grande Prêmio de Interlagos	16 de diciembre	(Argentina) Mauro Passarino	(Brazil) Lucas Torres	(Brazil) Lucas Torres	(Brazil) PRT	(Japan) Kawasaki	

=== Supersport 400 ===
Ronda	Circuito	Fecha	Pole Position	Vuelta rápida	Piloto ganador	Equipo ganador	Constructor	Ref.
1	(São Paulo (state)) Grande Prêmio de São Paulo	28 de mayo	(Brazil) Lincoln Lima Melo	(Brazil) Rafael S. Oliveira	(Argentina) Mauro Passarino	(Brazil) Tecfil Racing Team	(Japan) Kawasaki	
2	(São Paulo (state)) Grande Prêmio Petrobras	18 de junio	(Argentina) Mauro Passarino	(Brazil) Lincoln Lima Melo	(Brazil) Lincoln Lima Melo	(Brazil) Tecfil Racing Team	(Japan) Kawasaki	
3	(São Paulo (state)) Grande Prêmio Elf	23 de julio	(Argentina) Mauro Passarino	(Argentina) Mauro Passarino	(Brazil) Leopoldo Manella	(Brazil) PSBK Racing	(Japan) Kawasaki	
4	(São Paulo (state)) Grande Prêmio Suhai	22 de agosto	(Argentina) Mauro Passarino	(Brazil) Lincoln Lima Melo	(Argentina) Mauro Passarino	(Brazil) Tecfil Racing Team	(Japan) Kawasaki	
5	(Goiás) Grande Prêmio de Goiânia	24 de septiembre	(Argentina) Mauro Passarino	(Brazil) Rafael S. Oliveira	(Brazil) Rafael S. Oliveira	(Brazil) Cajuru Racing	(Japan) Kawasaki	
6	(Paraná (state)) Grande Prêmio de Curitiba	28 de octubre	(Argentina) Mauro Passarino	(Brazil) Lincoln Lima Melo	(Brazil) Rafael S. Oliveira	(Brazil) Cajuru Racing	(Japan) Kawasaki	
7	Grande Prêmio de Minas Gerais	18 de noviembre	(Argentina) Mauro Passarino	(Brazil) Mário Salles	(Brazil) Mário Salles	(Brazil) RTT	(Japan) Kawasaki	
8	(São Paulo (state)) Grande Prêmio de Interlagos	16 de diciembre	(Brazil) João Pedro Arratia	(Argentina) Mauro Passarino	(Brazil) João Pedro Arratia	(Brazil) PSBK Racing	(Japan) Kawasaki	

=== Copa Honda CBR 650R ===
Ronda	Circuito	Fecha	Pole Position	Vuelta rápida	Piloto ganador	Equipo ganador	Constructor	Ref.
1	(São Paulo (state)) Grande Prêmio de São Paulo	28 de mayo	(Brazil) Guilherme Brito	(Brazil) Felipe Macan	(Brazil) João Vítor Carneiro	(Brazil) Cajuru Racing	(Japan) Honda	
2	(São Paulo (state)) Grande Prêmio Petrobras	18 de junio	(Brazil) Guilherme Brito	(Brazil) Felipe Macan	(Brazil) João Vítor Carneiro	(Brazil) Cajuru Racing	(Japan) Honda	
3	(São Paulo (state)) Grande Prêmio Elf	23 de julio	(Brazil) Guilherme Brito	(Brazil) Felipe Macan	(Brazil) Guilherme Brito	(Brazil) Koube Motonil Motors	(Japan) Honda	
4	(São Paulo (state)) Grande Prêmio Suhai	22 de agosto	(Brazil) Felipe Gonçalves	(Brazil) Felipe Macan	(Brazil) João Vítor Carneiro	(Brazil) Cajuru Racing	(Japan) Honda	
5	(Goiás) Grande Prêmio de Goiânia	24 de septiembre	(Brazil) Felipe Gonçalves	(Brazil) João Vítor Carneiro	(Brazil) Felipe Gonçalves	(Brazil) PSBK Racing	(Japan) Honda	
6	(Paraná (state)) Grande Prêmio de Curitiba	28 de octubre	(Brazil) Felipe Macan	(Brazil) Felipe Macan	(Brazil) Guilherme Brito	(Brazil) Koube Motonil Motors	(Japan) Honda	
7	Grande Prêmio de Minas Gerais	18 de noviembre	(Brazil) Guilherme Brito	(Brazil) Guilherme Brito	(Brazil) Guilherme Brito	(Brazil) Koube Motonil Motors	(Japan) Honda	
8	(São Paulo (state)) Grande Prêmio de Interlagos	16 de diciembre	(Brazil) Guilherme Brito	(Brazil) Felipe Gonçalves	(Brazil) João Vítor Carneiro	(Brazil) Cajuru Racing	(Japan) Honda	

=== Superbike Escola ===
Ronda	Circuito	Fecha	Pole Position	Vuelta rápida	Piloto ganador	Equipo ganador	Constructor	Ref.
1	(São Paulo (state)) Grande Prêmio de São Paulo	28 de mayo	(Brazil) Júnior "Juninho 10"	(Brazil) André Batista	(Brazil) Felipe Bittencourt	(Brazil) PCM/PRT	(Japan) Suzuki	
2	(São Paulo (state)) Grande Prêmio Petrobras	18 de junio	(Brazil) Christian Simonit	(Brazil) Alex de Souza	(Brazil) Alex de Souza	(Brazil) Koube Motonil Motors	(Japan) Kawasaki	
3	(São Paulo (state)) Grande Prêmio Elf	23 de julio	(Brazil) Jeferson Bezerra	(Brazil) Alex de Souza	(Brazil) Thales de Paula	(Brazil) PKM Racing	(Germany) BMW	
4	(São Paulo (state)) Grande Prêmio Suhai	22 de agosto	(Brazil) Alex de Souza	(Brazil) Alex de Souza	(Brazil) Alex de Souza	(Brazil) Koube Motonil Motors	(Japan) Kawasaki	
5	(Goiás) Grande Prêmio de Goiânia	24 de septiembre	(Argentina) Sebastian Bongiovanni	(Brazil) Christian Simonit	(Brazil) Christian Simonit	(Brazil) RXP/TRH Racing	(Germany) BMW	
6	(Paraná (state)) Grande Prêmio de Curitiba	28 de octubre	(Brazil) Alex de Souza	(Brazil) Alex de Souza	(Brazil) Márcio Pacheco	(Brazil) Tom Racing	(Japan) Kawasaki	
7	Grande Prêmio de Minas Gerais	18 de noviembre	(Brazil) Rafael Maranhão Gonçalves	(Brazil) André Batista	(Brazil) Alex de Souza	(Brazil) Koube Motonil Motors	(Japan) Kawasaki	
8	(São Paulo (state)) Grande Prêmio de Interlagos	16 de diciembre	(Brazil) Felipe Bittencourt	(Brazil) Christian Simonit	(Brazil) Felipe Bittencourt	(Brazil) PCM/PRT	(Japan) Suzuki	

=== Honda Junior Cup ===
Ronda	Circuito	Fecha	Pole Position	Vuelta rápida	Piloto ganador	Equipo ganador	Constructor	Ref.
1	(São Paulo (state)) Grande Prêmio de São Paulo	28 de mayo	(Brazil) Guilherme Fernandes	(Brazil) João Teixeira	(Brazil) João Teixeira	(Brazil) Certainty Racing	(Japan) Honda	
2	(São Paulo (state)) Grande Prêmio Petrobras	18 de junio	(Brazil) João Teixeira	(Brazil) Murilo Gomes Silva	(Brazil) Murilo Gomes Silva	(Argentina) Koopman Racing	(Japan) Honda	
3	(São Paulo (state)) Grande Prêmio Elf	23 de julio	(Brazil) João Teixeira	(Brazil) Guilherme Fernandes	(Brazil) Leonardo Marques Barbim	(Brazil) Spirit Racing	(Japan) Honda	
4	(São Paulo (state)) Grande Prêmio Suhai	22 de agosto	(Brazil) Guilherme Fernandes	(Brazil) Guilherme Fernandes	(Brazil) Guilherme Fernandes	(Brazil) Spirit Racing	(Japan) Honda	
5	(Goiás) Grande Prêmio de Goiânia	24 de septiembre	(Brazil) Murilo Gomes Silva	(Brazil) Enzo Ximenes	(Brazil) Murilo Gomes Silva	(Argentina) Koopman Racing	(Japan) Honda	
6	(Paraná (state)) Grande Prêmio de Curitiba	28 de octubre	(Brazil) João Teixeira	(Brazil) Murilo Gomes Silva	(Brazil) Leonardo Marques Barbim	(Brazil) Spirit Racing	(Japan) Honda	
7	Grande Prêmio de Minas Gerais	18 de noviembre	(Brazil) João Teixeira	(Brazil) Leonardo Marques Barbim	(Brazil) Leonardo Marques Barbim	(Brazil) Spirit Racing	(Japan) Honda	
8	(São Paulo (state)) Grande Prêmio de Interlagos	16 de diciembre	(Brazil) João Teixeira	(Brazil) Leonardo Marques Barbim	(Brazil) Guilherme Fernandes	(Brazil) Spirit Racing	(Japan) Honda	

== Standings ==
Classifications for the Brazilian Superbike Championship

=== Superbike ===
Icon	Class
PRO	PRO

Pos.	River	Moto	Class	(São Paulo (state)) SPO	(São Paulo (state)) PET	(São Paulo (state)) ELF	(São Paulo (state)) SUH	(Goiás) GOI	(Paraná (state)) CTB	(Minas Gerais) MGS	(São Paulo (state)) INT	Pts
1	(Brazil) Pedro Sampaio	Honda	PRO	1	1	10	1	1	3	2	2	177
2	(Brazil) Mauriti Ribeiro Jr	Kawasaki	PRO	3	2	4	3	5	6	3	3	129
3	(Brazil) Leonardo Tamburro	Kawasaki	PRO	2	6	1	2	9	7	4	9	123
4	(Brazil) Júlio Fortunato	BMW	PRO	5	4	3		2	4	8	4	121
5	(Brazil) Danilo Lewis	BMW	PRO						1	1	1	77
6	(Brazil) Beto Auad	Kawasaki	PRO	6	9	8		7		5	8	70
7	(Argentina) Facundo Sanguinetti	Ducati	PRO	4	8	5	5		Ret	9	7	59
8	(Brazil) Hermes Machado	Bimota	PRO	Ret	3		4	8	DNP	7	6	56
9	(Brazil) Victor Villaverde	Ducati	PRO	9	Ret	2	9	3	NC		Ret	50
10	(Italy) Luca Iannaccone	Kawasaki	PRO	10	Ret		6		8		5	35
11	(Brazil) Fernando Henning	Bimota	PRO	8	5	DNS	DNQ		DSQ	6		29
12	(Brazil) Rogério Ceratti	Kawasaki	PRO			7		4			DNS	22
13	(Brazil) Márcio Fumagalli	Aprilia	PRO	7	Ret	9	DNS			10		22
14	(Colombia) Alejandro Piedrahíta	MV Agusta	PRO	DNS					2	Ret	DNA	20
15	(Argentina) Ignácio Rodríguez	Yamaha	PRO	13	11	6	Wth					18
16	(Brazil) Evando Behr	Yamaha	PRO	Ret	10		7		NC			15
17	(Germany) Maximilian Hackl	BMW	PRO	12	DNQ		Ret	6				14
18	(Argentina) Francisco Vélez	Aprilia	PRO	11	7					Ret	INF	14
19	(Brazil) Gilberto Gadones	BMW	PRO						5	Ret		11
20	(Brazil) Guilherme Brito	Kawasaki	PRO			11			DNS	Ret	Ret	10
21	(Brazil) Maicon Zuge	BMW	PRO	DNS		INF	8					8
22	(Brazil) Jorge Schwerz	MV Agusta	PRO	Ret		Ret						0
23	(Brazil) Márcio Bortolini	Honda	PRO								Ret	0
24	(Argentina) Maurício Roldán	Suzuki	PRO			Ret						0
25	(Brazil) Leonardo Neiland	Kawasaki	PRO				Ret	Ret		DNS	DSQ	0
26	(Brazil) Éverton Marinho	BMW	PRO				Ret					0
27	(Brazil) Marcelo Lago	BMW	PRO					DNS				0
28	(Brazil) Luciano Rocha	Yamaha	PRO					NC				0
29	(Brazil) Adriano Palladino	Suzuki	PRO					NQ				0
30	(Brazil) Tiago Binkowski	Kawasaki	PRO						Ret	Ret		0
31	(Brazil) Caetano Mello	Kawasaki	PRO						DNS			0
32	(Brazil) Fernando Minuscoli	Kawasaki	PRO						Ret			0
33	(Brazil) Gilberto Azambuja	Kawasaki	PRO							Ret	Ret	0
34	(Brazil) Bruno Corano	BMW	PRO								DNS	0
Pos	Rider	Moto	Class	(São Paulo (state)) SPO	(São Paulo (state)) PET	(São Paulo (state)) ELF	(São Paulo (state)) SUH	(Goiás) GOI	(Paraná (state)) CTB	(Minas Gerais) MGS	(São Paulo (state)) INT	Pts

Colour	Result
Gold	Winner
Silver	Second place
Bronze	Third place
Green	Points classification
Blue	Non-points classification
Blue	Non-classified finish (NC)
Purple	Retired, not classified (Ret)
Red	Did not qualify (DNQ)
Red	Did not pre-qualify (DNPQ)
Black	Disqualified (DSQ)
White	Did not start (DNS)
White	Withdrew (WD)
White	Race cancelled (C)
Blank	Did not practice (DNP)
Blank	Did not arrive (DNA)
Blank	Excluded (EX)

=== Constructors' standings ===
Pos	Constructor	(São Paulo (state)) SPO	(São Paulo (state)) PET	(São Paulo (state)) ELF	(São Paulo (state)) SUH	(Goiás) GOI	(Paraná (state)) CTB	(Minas Gerais) MGS	(São Paulo (state)) INT	Pts
1	(Japan) Honda	1	1	10	1	1	3	2	2	162
2	(Germany) BMW	5	4	3	Ret	2	1	1	1	135
3	(Japan) Kawasaki	2	2	1	2	4	6	4	5	132
4	(Italy) Ducati	4	8	2	5	3	Ret	9	7	84
5	(Italy) Bimota	8	3	DNS	4	8	DSQ	6	6	65
6	(Italy) Aprilia	7	7	9	DNS			10	INF	31
7	(Japan) Yamaha	13	11	6	7	NC				27
8	(Italy) MV Agusta	Ret		Ret			2	Ret	DNA	20
9	(Japan) Suzuki			Ret		NQ				0
Pos	Constructor	(São Paulo (state)) SPO	(São Paulo (state)) PET	(São Paulo (state)) ELF	(São Paulo (state)) SUH	(Goiás) GOI	(Paraná (state)) CTB	(Minas Gerais) MGS	(São Paulo (state)) INT	Pts

=== Superbike Pro Master ===
Icon	Class
MAS	PRO Master

Pos.	River	Moto	Class	(São Paulo (state)) SPO	(São Paulo (state)) PET	(São Paulo (state)) ELF	(São Paulo (state)) SUH	(Goiás) GOI	(Paraná (state)) CTB	(Minas Gerais) MGS	(São Paulo (state)) INT	Pts
1	(Brazil) Alex Barros	BMW	MAS	8	3	1	1	1	5	Ret	8	118
2	(Brazil) Mauri Grando	KTM	MAS	9	1	4	3	8	1	29	2	114
3	(Argentina) Federico Boasso	Yamaha	MAS	2	10	14	6	5	2	4	1	107
4	(Argentina) Emiliano Bogado	KTM	MAS	4	7	7	5	7	4	1	3	105
5	(Brazil) Marcelo Machado	Gas Gas	MAS	6	5	9	2	2	7	7	4	99
6	(Brazil) Fabiano Mazzochin	Kawasaki	MAS	DNS	2		10	3	3	2	10	84
7	(Brazil) Matheus Andreas	KTM	MAS	1	Ret	2	Ret	4		3		74
8	(Brazil) Reinaldo Pereira	Kawasaki	MAS	5	4	6	12	12	9	6	7	68
9	(Brazil) Álvaro Becker	Yamaha	MAS	7	6	5	7	9	10	13	13	58
10	(Brazil) César Busnello	Honda	MAS	14	9	8	14	10	8	5	9	51
11	(Brazil) Fernando Medeiros	Husqvarna	MAS	15	Ret	3	Ret	6	Ret	8	6	45
12	(Brazil) Carlos Saraiva	Honda	MAS	3	Ret	Ret	4	19	6	26	18	39
13	(Brazil) Wílson Gross	BMW	MAS	17	8	10	9	18	15	10	12	32
14	(Brazil) Rodrigo Pox	Yamaha	MAS	19	14	Ret	11	11	12	15	5	28
15	(Brazil) Alexandre Fraga	Gas Gas	MAS	Ret	13	15	8	Ret	14	11	Ret	19
16	(Brazil) Jair Mendes	KTM	MAS	Ret	11	18	Ret	15	11	12	15	16
17	(Brazil) Bruno Pataxo	Yamaha	MAS	10	15	Ret	13	24	13	21	14	15
18	(Brazil) Nélson Santana	Yamaha	MAS	11	Ret	17	Ret	16		9	23	12
19	(Brazil) Elias Cabreira	Yamaha	MAS	13		12		13		14	Ret	12
20	(Paraguay) Ricardo Garay	KTM	MAS	24		11		14	Ret	17		7
21	(Brazil) Roberto Silva	KTM	MAS	12		13						7
22	(Brazil) Adavílson Lazzarotto	Yamaha	MAS	26		Ret	C-19	21		Ret	11	5
23	(Brazil) Bruno Eizerik	Husqvarna	MAS	16	12	28	16	31	22	27	25	4
24	(Brazil) Mariano Serra	KTM	MAS				15	25	Ret	Ret	20	1
25	(Brazil) João Marcelo Tavares	Yamaha	MAS	Ret		16		27	Ret	Ret	Ret	0
26	(Brazil) Jorge Cardoso	Honda	MAS	27	16	Ret	18		21		Ret	0
27	(Brazil) Ibrail Vergueiro	Husqvarna	MAS	25		Ret	17	22	17	23	17	0
28	(Brazil) Lucas Fuhr	KTM	MAS	33	18	24	20	26	19	18	16	0
29	(Brazil) Pedro Stein	Husqvarna	MAS	23		26	Ret	Ret	16	25	19	0
30	(Brazil) Danny Araújo	Honda	MAS	20	17	Ret	19	17	18	19	27	0
31	(Brazil) Rodrigo Conte	Yamaha	MAS					20		16	21	0
32	(Argentina) Santiago Valenzuela	KTM	MAS	18		25		Ret				0
33	(Armenia) Mauro Guevgeozián	Honda	MAS			19						0
34	(Argentina) Mariano Puch	Honda	MAS		19			Ret				0
35	(Portugal) Guilherme Guedes	Honda	MAS		20		21	30	23	30	24	0
36	(Uruguay) Solano Silva	Honda	MAS		Ret		Ret		20		Ret	0
37	(Italy) Alessandro Seghetti	Yamaha	MAS			21						0
38	(Brazil) Ari Zanoni	Husqvarna	MAS	22		20						0
39	(Brazil) Vítor Amaral	Husqvarna	MAS	28		DNS		Ret		20		0
40	(Brazil) Ricardo Cougo	Husqvarna	MAS	21		22						0
41	(Brazil) Giovanni Ferraz	Yamaha	MAS					23		28		0
42	(Brazil) Vinícius Carvalho	KTM	MAS	Ret		23						0
43	(Argentina) Jonathan Dellarossa	KTM	MAS	32		DNS		28	24	22	26	0
44	(Spain) Marc Carbó	KTM	MAS	29		27		29		24	22	0
45	(Brazil) Rogério Poggere	KTM	MAS						25		28	0
46	(Brazil) Gabriel Vaz	Honda	MAS	30		Ret						0
47	(Serbia) Marko Scepovic	Husqvarna	MAS	31								0
48	(Brazil) Fernando Resner	Honda	MAS	34								0
49	(Brazil) Rafael Pinto	Honda	MAS	35								0
50	(Uruguay) Andrés Mehring	KTM	MAS				Ret					0
51	(Brazil) Mário Manfro	Suzuki	MAS		DNS							0
Pos	Piloto	Moto	Clase	(São Paulo (state)) SPO	(São Paulo (state)) PET	(São Paulo (state)) ELF	(São Paulo (state)) SUH	(Goiás) GOI	(Paraná (state)) CTB	(Minas Gerais) MGS	(São Paulo (state)) INT	Pts

Colour	Result
Gold	Winner
Silver	Second place
Bronze	Third place
Green	Points classification
Blue	Non-points classification
Blue	Non-classified finish (NC)
Purple	Retired, not classified (Ret)
Red	Did not qualify (DNQ)
Red	Did not pre-qualify (DNPQ)
Black	Disqualified (DSQ)
White	Did not start (DNS)
White	Withdrew (WD)
White	Race cancelled (C)
Blank	Did not practice (DNP)
Blank	Did not arrive (DNA)
Blank	Excluded (EX)

=== Constructors' standings ===
Pos	Constructor	(São Paulo (state)) SPO	(São Paulo (state)) PET	(São Paulo (state)) ELF	(São Paulo (state)) SUH	(Goiás) GOI	(Paraná (state)) CTB	(Minas Gerais) MGS	(São Paulo (state)) INT	Pts
1	(Austria) KTM	1	1	2	3	4	1	1	2	169
2	(Japan) Yamaha	2	6	5	6	5	2	4	1	120
3	(Germany) BMW	8	3	1	1	1	5	Ret	8	118
4	(Japan) Kawasaki	5	2	6	10	3	3	2	7	108
5	(Spain) Gas Gas	6	5	9	2	2	7	7	4	99
6	(Japan) Honda	3	9	8	4	10	6	5	9	78
7	(Sweden) Husqvarna	15	12	3	Ret	6	Ret	8	6	49
8	(Japan) Suzuki		DNS							0
Pos	Constructor	(São Paulo (state)) SPO	(São Paulo (state)) PET	(São Paulo (state)) ELF	(São Paulo (state)) SUH	(Goiás) GOI	(Paraná (state)) CTB	(Minas Gerais) MGS	(São Paulo (state)) INT	Pts

=== Superbike Light ===
Icon	Class
EVO	EVO
LGT	Light
MAS	Master
SEN	Master Senior

Pos.	River	Moto	Class	(São Paulo (state)) SPO	(São Paulo (state)) PET	(São Paulo (state)) ELF	(São Paulo (state)) SUH	(Goiás) GOI	(Paraná (state)) CTB	(Minas Gerais) MGS	(São Paulo (state)) INT	Pts
1	(Brazil) Joelsu Mitiko	Kawasaki	EVO	11	1	1	2	3	1	11	1	146
2	(Brazil) André Veríssimo	Kawasaki	EVO	1	2	2	1	4	4	4	3	145
3	(Brazil) Manow Martins	Kawasaki	EVO	Ret	3	5	3	2	3	2	2	119
4	(Brazil) Raphael Santos	BMW	LGT	5	6	4	6	14	7	6	11	70
5	(Brazil) Rodrigo Dazzi	BMW	EVO				10	1		3	4	60
6	(Brazil) Leandro Pardini	BMW	LGT	7	5	8	16	Ret	11	5	7	53
7	(Brazil) Alex Godói	Kawasaki	MAS	10	14	9	9	7	6	9	14	50
8	(Brazil) Rafael Palmieri "Rizada"	BMW	EVO	2		3	4		Ret			49
9	(Brazil) Danilo Brun	Kawasaki	LGT	9	8	7	14	Ret	16	7	6	45
10	(Brazil) Édson Luiz Mamute	Suzuki	MAS	17		12	8	6	5	8	Ret	41
11	(Brazil) Wesley Lima	BMW	LGT	12	19	14	12	5	13	10	16	35
12	(Brazil) Felipe Macan	Kawasaki	EVO							1	8	33
13	(Brazil) Felipe Comerlatto	BMW	EVO	3	11	19	7	Ret	Ret			30
14	(Brazil) Victor Villaverde	BMW	EVO		9		5				5	29
15	(Brazil) Luiz Bertoli	Kawasaki	LGT	14	16	11	13	12	8		9	29
16	(Brazil) Luís Ferraz	BMW	LGT	Ret	13	10	19	10	14	12	12	25
17	(Brazil) Juliano Ferrante	Kawasaki	EVO		12				2			24
18	(Brazil) Breno Barbosa	Yamaha	LGT	6		13	NQ	8			13	24
19	(Brazil) Luciano Pokémon	Suzuki	EVO		4	6						23
20	(Brazil) Marcelo Skaf	Kawasaki	EVO	4	Ret	Ret	DNA	AN	9	Ret		20
21	(Brazil) Luís Armando Boechat	BMW	SEN	13	15	15	18	9	12	14	18	18
22	(Brazil) Peterson Pet	BMW	LGT	8	10	Ret	11	Ret	Ret			13
23	(Brazil) Osvaldo Jorge "Duende"	Kawasaki	EVO				15				10	7
24	(Brazil) Tiago Binkowski	Kawasaki	EVO						10			6
25	(Brazil) Rodrigo Simon	Honda	LGT	16	20	16	Ret	11	15	Ret		6
26	(Brazil) Édson Errera	Honda	SEN	19	22	20	Ret	13	17	15	19	4
27	(Brazil) Demétrius Machado	BMW	EVO							13		3
28	(Brazil) Nélson Gonçalves "Mágico"	BMW	SEN	20	21	18	Ret	15	DSQ	DSQ	21	1
29	(Brazil) Luiz Roberto Nucci Ziliani	Ducati	LGT	18		DNS	Ret				15	1
30	(Brazil) Serginho Aparecido da Silva	Yamaha	LGT	15	Ret	22	Ret	Ret			20	1
31	(Brazil) Chrystian Quick	Honda	LGT		17	17	17	DSQ				0
32	(Argentina) Santiago Toloza	MV Agusta	MAS								17	0
33	(Brazil) Sérgio Prates	BMW	EVO	DSQ	18	DNF	Wth					0
34	(Brazil) Émerson Luiz	Kawasaki	MAS			21	DSQ					0
35	(Brazil) Elson Tenebra Otero	Suzuki	SEN								22	0
36	(Brazil) Caetano Mello	Kawasaki	EVO						NC			0
37	(Brazil) Leandro Siqueira	Kawasaki	EVO				Ret					0
38	(Brazil) Fernando Minuscoli	Kawasaki	EVO						Ret			0
39	(Argentina) Mauro Burruchaga	MV Agusta	MAS								Ret	0
40	(Brazil) Marcos Migliorelli	Ducati	LGT	Ret								0
41	(Brazil) Fabrício Marciano de Freitas	KTM	LGT								DNQ	0
42	(Brazil) Lúcio Mauro "Maurão	BMW	SEN					AN			NQ	0
43	(Brazil) Eduardo Marques	Honda	LGT					AN				0
Pos	Piloto	Moto	Clase	(São Paulo (state)) SPO	(São Paulo (state)) PET	(São Paulo (state)) ELF	(São Paulo (state)) SUH	(Goiás) GOI	(Paraná (state)) CTB	(Minas Gerais) MGS	(São Paulo (state)) INT	Pts

Colour	Result
Gold	Winner
Silver	Second place
Bronze	Third place
Green	Points classification
Blue	Non-points classification
Blue	Non-classified finish (NC)
Purple	Retired, not classified (Ret)
Red	Did not qualify (DNQ)
Red	Did not pre-qualify (DNPQ)
Black	Disqualified (DSQ)
White	Did not start (DNS)
White	Withdrew (WD)
White	Race cancelled (C)
Blank	Did not practice (DNP)
Blank	Did not arrive (DNA)
Blank	Excluded (EX)

=== Constructors' standings ===
Pos	Constructor	(São Paulo (state)) SPO	(São Paulo (state)) PET	(São Paulo (state)) ELF	(São Paulo (state)) SUH	(Goiás) GOI	(Paraná (state)) CTB	(Minas Gerais) MGS	(São Paulo (state)) INT	Pts
1	(Japan) Kawasaki	1	1	1	1	2	1	1	1	195
2	(Germany) BMW	2	6	3	4	1	7	3	4	122
3	(Japan) Suzuki	17	4	6	8	6	5	8	22	60
4	(Japan) Yamaha	6	Ret	13	NQ	8			13	24
5	(Japan) Honda	16	20	16	Ret	11	15	15	19	7
6	(Italy) Ducati	18		DNS	Ret				15	1
7	(Italy) MV Agusta								17	0
8	(Austria) KTM								DNQ	0
Pos	Constructor	(São Paulo (state)) SPO	(São Paulo (state)) PET	(São Paulo (state)) ELF	(São Paulo (state)) SUH	(Goiás) GOI	(Paraná (state)) CTB	(Minas Gerais) MGS	(São Paulo (state)) INT	Pts

=== Supersport 600 ===
Icon	Class
PRO	PRO
EXT	Extreme
EST	Estreante

Pos.	River	Moto	Class	(São Paulo (state)) SPO	(São Paulo (state)) PET	(São Paulo (state)) ELF	(São Paulo (state)) SUH	(Goiás) GOI	(Paraná (state)) CTB	(Minas Gerais) MGS	(São Paulo (state)) INT	Pts
1	(Brazil) Gustavo Manso	Kawasaki	PRO	Ret	2	3	1	1	2	1	2	147
2	(Brazil) Théo Manna	Kawasaki	PRO	5	4	2	3	2	3	2	3	132
3	(Brazil) Lucas Torres	Kawasaki	PRO			1	2	3	1	15	1	112
4	(Brazil) Victor "Durval Careca"	Triumph	PRO	4	5	5	4	5	4	9	DNS	79
5	(Brazil) Diego Viveiros	Kawasaki	PRO	2	1	4					6	68
6	(Brazil) Régis Santos	Kawasaki	EXT			9	9	4	5	4	7	62
7	(Brazil) Pedro Kamikaze	Kawasaki	EXT	7	6	10	8	6	6	16	8	61
8	(Brazil) Marcello de Souza	Kawasaki	EXT		9	12	10	7	7	8	10	49
9	(Brazil) Rubens Mesquita	Kawasaki	PRO	6	3	6	6					46
10	(Brazil) Ronaldo "Tutti" Ranieri	Kawasaki	EST	8	18	14	12	10	10	6	11	42
11	(Brazil) Paulo Joe King	Kawasaki	EST	9	10	13	11	11	9	Ret	13	36
12	(Brazil) Paulo Foroni	Kawasaki	EXT	10	7	20	Ret	14	12	11	14	28
13	(Brazil) Daniel Gurgel Mendonça	Kawasaki	PRO		Ret	8	5				4	26
14	(Brazil) Ives Moraes	Triumph	PRO	1								25
15	(Brazil) Júlio César Parra	Kawasaki	PRO	3	Ret						9	23
16	(Brazil) Marcos Fortunato	Kawasaki	EXT	11	NQ	15	DSQ	13	8	20	17	17
17	(Brazil) Jonas José Vieira "McDonalds"	Kawasaki	EST	17	11	17	13	16	13	10	20	17
18	(Brazil) Rafael Paschoalin	Honda	PRO							3		16
19	(Brazil) Tiago Serafim	Kawasaki	EST							5	12	15
20	(Argentina) Franco Pandolfino	Kawasaki	EXT	21	21	11	7				NA	14
21	(Paraguay) Pedro Valiente	Yamaha	PRO								5	11
22	(Brazil) Rafael Augusto	Kawasaki	EST	14	8	25						10
23	(Brazil) Luiz Cerciari	Kawasaki	PRO	Ret	Ret	7	NPQ					9
24	(Uruguay) Sebastian Alonso	Honda	PRO							7		9
25	(Brazil) Daniel Zape	Kawasaki	EST					12	11			9
26	(Brazil) Olímpio Filho	Kawasaki	EST					8	Ret			8
27	(Brazil) Douglas Russo	Kawasaki	EXT	12	15	16	15			14	NA	8
28	(Brazil) Marco Theodoro	Kawasaki	EST	INF	14	18	16	17	15	12		7
29	(Brazil) Vicente Flores	Kawasaki	EST					9	X			7
30	(Brazil) Marcos Kawasaki	Kawasaki	EXT	13	13	21	17	19	18	18		6
31	(Brazil) Gabriel Silva	Yamaha	EST	15	12	Ret					Ret	5
32	(Brazil) Júnio Bereta	Triumph	EST	20	16	24	20	20	16	13	21	3
33	(Brazil) Thirsen Mourão	Yamaha	EST	Ret				15	14			3
34	(Brazil) Luiz Imparato	Kawasaki	EXT	18	17		14				16	2
35	(Brazil) Luiz Boechat	Kawasaki	EST								15	1
36	(Brazil) Gérson Caleb	Kawasaki	EXT	16	Ret						18	0
37	(Brazil) Guilherme M. de Assis	MV Agusta	EST				18	18	17			0
38	(Brazil) Reinaldo Spinola	Kawasaki	EST							17		0
39	(Brazil) Allan Josefh	Triumph	EST	DNF	19	22	21				19	0
40	(Brazil) Walter Becker	Triumph	EST	DNS	Ret	19	19				23	0
41	(Brazil) Fernando Henrique Murari "Brutus"	Yamaha	EST	19	20	23	22					0
42	(Brazil) Marcos Fugise	Triumph	EST					21	19			0
43	(Brazil) Hebert Pereira	Kawasaki	PRO							19		0
44	(Brazil) Fabrício Bandeira	Kawasaki	EST								22	0
45	(Brazil) Felipe Macan	Kawasaki	PRO					Ret	DNS			0
46	(Argentina) Mauro Passarino	Kawasaki	EXT								Ret	0
47	(Brazil) Aroldo Jr	Kawasaki	EST							Ret		0
48	(Brazil) Fabrício Vásques	Yamaha	EXT	DNS								0
Pos	Piloto	Moto	Clase	(São Paulo (state)) SPO	(São Paulo (state)) PET	(São Paulo (state)) ELF	(São Paulo (state)) SUH	(Goiás) GOI	(Paraná (state)) CTB	(Minas Gerais) MGS	(São Paulo (state)) INT	Pts

Colour	Result
Gold	Winner
Silver	Second place
Bronze	Third place
Green	Points classification
Blue	Non-points classification
Blue	Non-classified finish (NC)
Purple	Retired, not classified (Ret)
Red	Did not qualify (DNQ)
Red	Did not pre-qualify (DNPQ)
Black	Disqualified (DSQ)
White	Did not start (DNS)
White	Withdrew (WD)
White	Race cancelled (C)
Blank	Did not practice (DNP)
Blank	Did not arrive (DNA)
Blank	Excluded (EX)

=== Constructors' standings ===
Pos	Constructor	(São Paulo (state)) SPO	(São Paulo (state)) PET	(São Paulo (state)) ELF	(São Paulo (state)) SUH	(Goiás) GOI	(Paraná (state)) CTB	(Minas Gerais) MGS	(São Paulo (state)) INT	Pts
1	(Japan) Kawasaki	2	1	1	1	1	1	1	1	195
2	(United Kingdom) Triumph	1	16	19	19	20	16	13	19	28
3	(Japan) Yamaha	15	12	Ret	22	15	14		5	19
4	(Japan) Honda							3		16
5	(Italy) MV Agusta				18	18	17			0
Pos	Constructor	(São Paulo (state)) SPO	(São Paulo (state)) PET	(São Paulo (state)) ELF	(São Paulo (state)) SUH	(Goiás) GOI	(Paraná (state)) CTB	(Minas Gerais) MGS	(São Paulo (state)) INT	Pts

=== Supersport 400 ===
Icon	Class
NJA	Ninja 400 Cup
MAS	R3 Master
R3	R3 Cup
400	Ninja 400
NMT	Ninja 400 Master
CBR	CBR 500R

Pos.	River	Moto	Class	(São Paulo (state)) SPO	(São Paulo (state)) PET	(São Paulo (state)) ELF	(São Paulo (state)) SUH	(Goiás) GOI	(Paraná (state)) CTB	(Minas Gerais) MGS	(São Paulo (state)) INT	Pts
1	(Brazil) Lincoln Lima Melo	Kawasaki	400	2	1	3	3	5	2	3	2	144
2	(Argentina) Mauro Passarino	Kawasaki	NJA	1	3	2	1	2	26	16	11	111
3	(Brazil) João Pedro Arratia	Kawasaki	NJA	Ret	4	4	4	3	8	2	1	108
4	(Brazil) Rafael S. Oliveira	Kawasaki	400	3	Ret	7	5	1	1	6	DSQ	96
5	(Brazil) Leopoldo Manella	Kawasaki	NJA		2	1	2	10	7	10	15	87
6	(Brazil) Mário Salles	Kawasaki	NJA	7	7	6	7	6	14	1	8	82
7	(Brazil) Pedro Balla	Kawasaki	NJA	4	5	5	6	8	5	4	INF	80
8	(Brazil) Gustavo Silveira "Gão"	Kawasaki	NJA	11	8	9	10	9	3	7	7	67
9	(Brazil) Pedro Foroni	Kawasaki	NJA	9	11	13	14	15	10	5	3	51
10	(Argentina) Mateo Bongiovanni Escobar	Kawasaki	NJA	Ret	Ret	14	8	7	6	12	6	43
11	(Brazil) Renan Passos	Kawasaki	NMT	8		16		12	15	23	16	36
12	(Brazil) Gabrielly Lewis	Yamaha	R3	13	13	11	16	19	13	13	19	35
13	(Brazil) Osmar Gonçalves	Kawasaki	NMT	17	16	17	15	17	11	21	5	35
14	(Brazil) Ana Lima	Kawasaki	NMT	14	6	Ret	9	13	Ret	11	9	34
15	(Brazil) Enzo Macapani	Yamaha	R3	15	9	12	Ret	11	9	9	13	34
16	(Brazil) Filipe Campos	Kawasaki	NJA	16	12	10	11	14				17
17	(Brazil) Jorge Jr	Kawasaki	400	12	10	18		18	12	15		15
18	(Brazil) Léo Mascarello	Kawasaki	400	10		8						14
19	(Brazil) Raphael Ramos	Kawasaki	400						4			13
20	(Brazil) João Fascinelli	Yamaha	R3								4	13
21	(Brazil) Lucca Augusto	Kawasaki	400					4				13
22	(Brazil) André Schettini	Kawasaki	400				12			8		12
23	(Brazil) Christian Cerciari	Kawasaki	400	5	Ret	DSQ						11
24	(Brazil) Enzo Valentim Garcia	Yamaha	R3	6		DSQ						10
25	(Brazil) Eduardo Burr	Yamaha	R3								10	6
26	(Brazil) Brayann Santos Ligeirinho	Yamaha	R3	23	14	15	19	22	19		14	5
27	(Brazil) Edinho Pikoloko	Yamaha	MAS	20	18		26		20	19	27	5
28	(Brazil) Fabrício Zamperetti	Yamaha	MAS	18		20	21			14	20	4
29	(Brazil) Fábio Vuicik	Kawasaki	MAS								12	4
30	(Brazil) Joaquim Fernandes	Kawasaki	NMT		15	28			Ret			1
31	(Brazil) Fabinho da Hornet	Honda	CBR	19	17	21	23	23	18	17	Ret	1
32	(Brazil) Werley Campelo	Kawasaki	400		DNS			20			17	0
33	(Brazil) Felipe K. da Silveira	Kawasaki	400				17					0
34	(Brazil) Vinícius Martínez	Kawasaki	NMT			19	20	16	28		21	0
35	(Brazil) Alex Fernandes	Kawasaki	NMT	21	21	Ret	25	24	17	18	26	0
36	(Brazil) Mauro Sapico	Yamaha	R3				18	21	16			0
37	(Brazil) José Assis	Kawasaki	MAS								18	0
38	(Brazil) Ricardo de Camargo	Yamaha	MAS	22	19	27	29			20	Ret	0
39	(Brazil) Eduardo Lopes	Kawasaki	NMT		20						24	0
40	(Brazil) Enzo Dematte	Kawasaki	400						23		22	0
41	(Brazil) Heitor Ourinho	Yamaha	R3		22	24	28	25	29	22	34	0
42	(Brazil) Gui Foguetinho	Yamaha	R3				22		21		Ret	0
43	(Brazil) Lucas Silva	Yamaha	R3			22	24				23	0
44	(Brazil) Daniel Leites	Kawasaki	NMT						22			0
45	(Brazil) Magno "Menino de Ouro"	Kawasaki	NMT		23	25					29	0
46	(Brazil) Edgar Grampola	Honda	CBR			23						0
47	(Brazil) Edinaldo Dias	Kawasaki	400						24			0
48	(Brazil) Tirsten Soares Mourão	Kawasaki	NJA								25	0
49	(Brazil) Fabiano Silva	Kawasaki	400						25			0
50	(Brazil) Léo Marques	Yamaha	MAS			26	27				30	0
51	(Brazil) Vinícius Dissenha	Kawasaki	400						27			0
52	(Brazil) Flávio Trevizan	Kawasaki	NJA								28	0
53	(Brazil) Ian Góes	Yamaha	R3				30				Ret	0
54	(Brazil) Cauã Buzzo	Yamaha	R3								31	0
55	(Brazil) Caio Baldoíno	Yamaha	R3								32	0
56	(Brazil) Gui Stunt	Honda	CBR								33	0
57	(Brazil) Léo Soprano	Yamaha	R3								34	0
58	(Brazil) Vinícius Fideliz	Kawasaki	NJA								NC	0
59	(Argentina) Fernando Sainz	Honda	CBR					Ret				0
60	(Brazil) Daw Pereira	Kawasaki	NJA								Ret	0
61	(Brazil) Luciano Charles	Kawasaki	400							Ret		0
62	(Brazil) Willians Piuí	Kawasaki	NMT			DSQ						0
Pos	Piloto	Moto	Clase	(São Paulo (state)) SPO	(São Paulo (state)) PET	(São Paulo (state)) ELF	(São Paulo (state)) SUH	(Goiás) GOI	(Paraná (state)) CTB	(Minas Gerais) MGS	(São Paulo (state)) INT	Pts

Colour	Result
Gold	Winner
Silver	Second place
Bronze	Third place
Green	Points classification
Blue	Non-points classification
Blue	Non-classified finish (NC)
Purple	Retired, not classified (Ret)
Red	Did not qualify (DNQ)
Red	Did not pre-qualify (DNPQ)
Black	Disqualified (DSQ)
White	Did not start (DNS)
White	Withdrew (WD)
White	Race cancelled (C)
Blank	Did not practice (DNP)
Blank	Did not arrive (DNA)
Blank	Excluded (EX)

=== Constructors' standings ===
Pos	Constructor	(São Paulo (state)) SPO	(São Paulo (state)) PET	(São Paulo (state)) ELF	(São Paulo (state)) SUH	(Goiás) GOI	(Paraná (state)) CTB	(Minas Gerais) MGS	(São Paulo (state)) INT	Pts
1	(Japan) Kawasaki	1	1	1	1	1	1	1	1	200
2	(Japan) Yamaha	6	9	11	16	19	9	9	4	49
3	(Japan) Honda	19	17	21	23	23	18	17	33	0
Pos	Constructor	(São Paulo (state)) SPO	(São Paulo (state)) PET	(São Paulo (state)) ELF	(São Paulo (state)) SUH	(Goiás) GOI	(Paraná (state)) CTB	(Minas Gerais) MGS	(São Paulo (state)) INT	Pts

=== Copa Honda CBR 650R ===
Icon	Class
PRO	PRO
PMA	PRO Master
EVO	EVO
EVM	EVO Master
LTM	Light Master

Pos.	River	Moto	Class	(São Paulo (state)) SPO	(São Paulo (state)) PET	(São Paulo (state)) ELF	(São Paulo (state)) SUH	(Goiás) GOI	(Paraná (state)) CTB	(Minas Gerais) MGS	(São Paulo (state)) INT	Pts
1	(Brazil) João Vítor Carneiro	Honda	PRO	1	1	3	1	3	2	2	1	172
2	(Brazil) Felipe Macan	Honda	PRO	3	2	2	4	2	3	3	2	141
3	(Brazil) Guilherme Brito	Honda	PRO	2	3	1	3	4	1	1	DSQ	140
4	(Brazil) Felipe Gonçalves	Honda	PRO	4	4	4	2	1	4	4	3	126
5	(Brazil) Richard Oliveira	Honda	PRO	7	7	5	5	5	5	Ret	4	75
6	(Brazil) Alexandre Colorado	Honda	PMA	9	9	8	8	6	7	6	6	69
7	(Brazil) Maurício Marques	Honda	PRO	8	5	6	7	10	6	5	DSQ	65
8	(Brazil) Maurício Laranjeira	Honda	EVO	12	17	12	11	7	8	8	9	47
9	(Brazil) Michael Valtingojer	Honda	EVO	11	11	10	9	DSQ	9	9	7	46
10	(Brazil) Marcelo Simões Bode	Honda	EVO	10	8	9	6	DNS	Ret	7	14	42
11	(Brazil) Lucas Minato	Honda	PRO	6	6	7	Ret	Ret			5	40
12	(Brazil) Rodrigo Medeiros	Honda	EVM	15	10	13	10	Ret	10	NC	8	30
13	(Brazil) Ayres Filho	Honda	LTM	17	14	16	13	Ret	12	11	13	23
14	(Brazil) Marcos Kawasaki	Honda	LTM	18	16	17	14	8	13	12	11	22
15	(Brazil) Anderson Felipe	Honda	EVM	14	13	15	12	Ret	Wth	10	15	17
16	(Brazil) Michael Alexandre "Tanga"	Honda	LTM	16	15	14	Ret	9	11	Ret		15
17	(Brazil) Marcelo Colorado	Honda	EVM	13	12	11						12
18	(Brazil) Rafael Rigueiro	Honda	PRO	5	Ret	Ret						11
19	(Brazil) Ronaldo Suricato	Honda	EVO	Ret							10	6
20	(Brazil) Luís "Betinho" Ferreira	Honda	LTM	19		18	15				12	5
21	(Brazil) Rafael Paschoalin	Honda	PRO								DNS	0
Pos	Piloto	Moto	Clase	(São Paulo (state)) SPO	(São Paulo (state)) PET	(São Paulo (state)) ELF	(São Paulo (state)) SUH	(Goiás) GOI	(Paraná (state)) CTB	(Minas Gerais) MGS	(São Paulo (state)) INT	Pts

Colour	Result
Gold	Winner
Silver	Second place
Bronze	Third place
Green	Points classification
Blue	Non-points classification
Blue	Non-classified finish (NC)
Purple	Retired, not classified (Ret)
Red	Did not qualify (DNQ)
Red	Did not pre-qualify (DNPQ)
Black	Disqualified (DSQ)
White	Did not start (DNS)
White	Withdrew (WD)
White	Race cancelled (C)
Blank	Did not practice (DNP)
Blank	Did not arrive (DNA)
Blank	Excluded (EX)

=== Superbike Escola ===
Icono	Categoría
ESC	Escola
EST	Estreante

Pos.	River	Moto	Class	(São Paulo (state)) SPO	(São Paulo (state)) PET	(São Paulo (state)) ELF	(São Paulo (state)) SUH	(Goiás) GOI	(Paraná (state)) CTB	(Minas Gerais) MGS	(São Paulo (state)) INT	Pts
1	(Brazil) Felipe Bittencourt	Suzuki	ESC	1	2	4	5	4	6	5	1	128
2	(Brazil) Alex de Souza	Kawasaki	ESC	6	1	2	1	Ret	3	1	16	121
3	(Brazil) Christian Simonit	BMW	ESC	9	3	7	2	1	Ret	14	2	99
4	(Brazil) Júnior "Juninho 10"	Kawasaki	ESC	3			10	5	8	8	4	62
5	(Brazil) Everton Nicks	Kawasaki	ESC	4	Ret	3	Ret	6	2			59
6	(Argentina) Sebastian Bongiovanni	Kawasaki	EST	11	6	9	9	2		Ret	13	58
7	(Brazil) Adílson Maurício	Kawasaki	EST	8	8	11	Ret	8	13	10	11	55
8	(Brazil) Lucas Bessa	Honda	EST				4	3	15	7	3	55
9	(Brazil) Alex Barbosa	BMW	EST			10	11	7	4		9	40
10	(Brazil) Renan Pezani	BMW	ESC	7	9		6				5	37
11	(Brazil) Jeferson Bezerra	BMW	EST	12		5	3		10			37
12	(Brazil) Leandro Nexo	BMW	EST	10	5	6	8	Ret	DNS		DNS	35
13	(Brazil) Gustavo Levy	Kawasaki	ESC	2	4	Ret						33
14	(Brazil) Vanderlei Pinho	BMW	EST	Ret	7	Ret	7	Ret	9		8	33
15	(Brazil) Márcio Pacheco	Kawasaki	EST						1		10	31
16	(Brazil) André Batista	BMW	ESC	5						3		27
17	(Brazil) Thales de Paula	BMW	ESC			1						25
18	(Brazil) Felipe Pan	Kawasaki	EST					10	11	11	7	25
19	(Brazil) Adelino Navarro	Kawasaki	EST	13	10	13	Ret	9		13	15	23
20	(Brazil) Sandro Oliveira	BMW	ESC							2		20
21	(Brazil) Rafael Maranhão Gonçalves	BMW	EST							4		13
22	(Brazil) André Grego	BMW	ESC						5		14	13
23	(Brazil) Luciano "Tiano"	BMW	ESC							6		10
24	(Brazil) Dimi Medellas	BMW	EST								6	10
25	(Brazil) Willian Silva	Kawasaki	ESC						7			9
26	(Brazil) Márcio Rodrigues	Kawasaki	EST			8						8
27	(Brazil) Caio Morisco	BMW	EST							9		7
28	(Brazil) Victor Hugo	Ducati	EST			12						4
29	(Brazil) Tiago Dellanegra	BMW	EST				12					4
30	(Brazil) Cláudio Feltrin	BMW	ESC						12			4
31	(Brazil) Luiz Carlos de Souza Pereira	BMW	ESC							12		4
32	(Brazil) Willian Almeida	Aprilia	EST								12	4
33	(Brazil) Eduardo Guerreiro	Kawasaki	EST	14								2
34	(Brazil) Cléverson Oliveira	BMW	EST						14			2
35	(Brazil) Alexandre Augusto	BMW	EST								17	0
36	(Brazil) Thiago Pedroso	BMW	EST						Ret			0
37	(Brazil) Bruno Félix	BMW	EST								Ret	0
38	(Brazil) Givanildo Massardi	BMW	EST							DNS		0
Pos	Piloto	Moto	Clase	(São Paulo (state)) SPO	(São Paulo (state)) PET	(São Paulo (state)) ELF	(São Paulo (state)) SUH	(Goiás) GOI	(Paraná (state)) CTB	(Minas Gerais) MGS	(São Paulo (state)) INT	Pts

Colour	Result
Gold	Winner
Silver	Second place
Bronze	Third place
Green	Points classification
Blue	Non-points classification
Blue	Non-classified finish (NC)
Purple	Retired, not classified (Ret)
Red	Did not qualify (DNQ)
Red	Did not pre-qualify (DNPQ)
Black	Disqualified (DSQ)
White	Did not start (DNS)
White	Withdrew (WD)
White	Race cancelled (C)
Blank	Did not practice (DNP)
Blank	Did not arrive (DNA)
Blank	Excluded (EX)

=== Constructors' standings ===
Pos	Constructor	(São Paulo (state)) SPO	(São Paulo (state)) PET	(São Paulo (state)) ELF	(São Paulo (state)) SUH	(Goiás) GOI	(Paraná (state)) CTB	(Minas Gerais) MGS	(São Paulo (state)) INT	Pts
1	(Japan) Kawasaki	3	1	2	1	2	1	1	4	169
2	(Germany) BMW	5	3	1	2	1	4	2	2	150
3	(Japan) Suzuki	1	2	4	5	4	6	5	1	128
4	(Japan) Honda				4	3	15	7	3	55
5	(Italy) Ducati			12						4
6	(Italy) Aprilia								12	4
Pos	Constructor	(São Paulo (state)) SPO	(São Paulo (state)) PET	(São Paulo (state)) ELF	(São Paulo (state)) SUH	(Goiás) GOI	(Paraná (state)) CTB	(Minas Gerais) MGS	(São Paulo (state)) INT	Pts

=== Honda Junior Cup ===
Icono	Categoría
CUP	Honda Junior Cup
FEM	Cup Feminino

Pos.	Rider	Moto	Class	(São Paulo (state)) SPO	(São Paulo (state)) PET	(São Paulo (state)) ELF	(São Paulo (state)) SUH	(Goiás) GOI	(Paraná (state)) CTB	(Minas Gerais) MGS	(São Paulo (state)) INT	Pts
1	(Brazil) João Teixeira	Honda	CUP	1	2	2	2	4	4	4	5	142
2	(Brazil) Guilherme Fernandes	Honda	CUP	2	4	7	1	5	3	2	1	141
3	(Brazil) Leonardo Marques Barbim	Honda	CUP	Ret	3	1	4	2	1	1	4	140
4	(Brazil) Murilo Gomes Silva	Honda	CUP	4	1	3	5	1	2	3	6	138
5	(Brazil) Enzo Ximenes	Honda	CUP	6	5	6	6	3	8	5	8	86
6	(Brazil) Heitor Luz Santos "Ourinho"	Honda	CUP	5	6	5	8	6	6	8	7	79
7	(Brazil) Giovana Brasil	Honda	FEM	3	Ret	4	3	10	10	6	14	72
8	(Brazil) Letícia Vivolo	Honda	FEM	8	8	11	10	12	11	9	Ret	44
9	(Brazil) Vítor Hugo	Honda	CUP			DNS	7			7	2	38
10	(Brazil) Gabriel Marchi	Honda	CUP	15	11	15	14	9	7	11	12	37
11	(Brazil) Vítor de Castro Ribeiro	Honda	CUP	7	7	12	15	14	12		13	35
12	(Brazil) Miguel Simon	Honda	CUP	9	13	14	16	7	9	12		33
13	(Argentina) Gustavo Martínez	Honda	CUP			8	9	8	16		10	31
14	(Brazil) Érick Adib	Honda	CUP	14	12	9	12		14		9	28
15	(Brazil) Lucas Mendes	Honda	CUP	11	9	10	11	11	DNS			28
16	(Italy) Valentino Dematte	Honda	CUP						5		3	27
17	(Brazil) Fernanda Lopes Marçon	Honda	FEM	13	10	13	17	15	13	10	Ret	23
18	(Brazil) Alice Matos	Honda	FEM	10	Ret	16	13	13	15		Ret	14
19	(Bolivia) Nicolás Torrez	Honda	CUP								11	5
20	(Brazil) Lucas Alsina dos Santos	Honda	CUP	12	Ret	17	Ret	Ret	Ret			4
21	(France) Rebecca Bernard	Honda	FEM							Ret		0
Pos	Piloto	Moto	Clase	(São Paulo (state)) SPO	(São Paulo (state)) PET	(São Paulo (state)) ELF	(São Paulo (state)) SUH	(Goiás) GOI	(Paraná (state)) CTB	(Minas Gerais) MGS	(São Paulo (state)) INT	Pts

Colour	Result
Gold	Winner
Silver	Second place
Bronze	Third place
Green	Points classification
Blue	Non-points classification
Blue	Non-classified finish (NC)
Purple	Retired, not classified (Ret)
Red	Did not qualify (DNQ)
Red	Did not pre-qualify (DNPQ)
Black	Disqualified (DSQ)
White	Did not start (DNS)
White	Withdrew (WD)
White	Race cancelled (C)
Blank	Did not practice (DNP)
Blank	Did not arrive (DNA)
Blank	Excluded (EX)

=== Scoring system ===
Points are awarded to the top fifteen finishers of the main race and to the top nine of the sprint. A rider has to finish the race to earn points.

Position	1°	2°	3°	4°	5°	6°	7°	8°	9°	10°	11°	12°	13°	14°	15°
Race	25	20	16	13	11	10	9	8	7	6	5	4	3	2	1

== Champions of all categories ==
=== Overview ===
#	Class	Champion	Team	Construtor	Moto	Ref
PRO	Superbike PRO	(Brazil) Pedro Sampaio	(Brazil) RXP / TRH Racing	(Japan) Honda	Honda CBR 1000RR	
MAS	Superbike PRO Master	(Brazil) Alex Barros	(Brazil) Alex Barros Racing	(Germany) BMW	BMW S1000RR	
EVO	Superbike Light Evolution	(Brazil) Joelsu Mitiko	(Brazil) Controllity Racing	(Japan) Kawasaki	Kawasaki Ninja ZX-10R	
LGT	Superbike Light	(Brazil) Raphael Santos	(Brazil) Ello Racing	(Germany) BMW	BMW S1000RR	
MAS	Superbike Light Master	(Brazil) Alex Godói	(Brazil) Tuning Prosport	(Japan) Kawasaki	Kawasaki Ninja ZX-10R	
SEN	Superbike Light Master Senior	(Brazil) Luís Armando Boechat	(Brazil) Lancer Racing	(Germany) BMW	BMW S1000RR	
PRO	Supersport 600 PRO	(Brazil) Gustavo Manso	(Brazil) Dezeró Racing	(Japan) Kawasaki	Kawasaki Ninja ZX-6R	
EXT	Supersport 600 Extreme	(Brazil) Régis Santos	(Brazil) Elden Racing	(Japan) Kawasaki	Kawasaki Ninja ZX-6R	
EST	Supersport 600 Estreante	(Brazil) Ronaldo "Tutti" Ranieri	(Brazil) Roadways Racing	(Japan) Kawasaki	Kawasaki Ninja ZX-6R	
NJA	Supersport 400 Ninja 400 Cup	(Argentina) Mauro Passarino	(Brazil) Tecfil Racing Team	(Japan) Kawasaki	Kawasaki Ninja 400	
MAS	Supersport 400 R3 Master	(Brazil) Edinho Pikoloko	(Brazil) PMA Motorsport	(Japan) Yamaha	Yamaha YZF-R3	
R3	Supersport 400 R3 Cup	(Brazil) Gabrielly Lewis	(Brazil) NV Racing	(Japan) Yamaha	Yamaha YZF-R3	
400	Supersport 400 Ninja 400	(Brazil) Lincoln Lima Melo	(Brazil) Tecfil Racing Team	(Japan) Kawasaki	Kawasaki Ninja 400	
NMT	Supersport 400 Ninja 400 Master	(Brazil) Renan Passos	(Brazil) One Sport Performance	(Japan) Kawasaki	Kawasaki Ninja 400	
CBR	Supersport 400 CBR 500R	(Brazil) Fabinho da Hornet	(Brazil) Bolza Corse	(Japan) Honda	Honda CBR 500R	
PRO	Copa Honda CBR 650R PRO	(Brazil) João Vítor Carneiro	(Brazil) Cajuru Racing	(Japan) Honda	Honda CBR 650R	
PMA	Copa Honda CBR 650R PRO Master	(Brazil) Alexandre Colorado	(Brazil) Colorado Racing	(Japan) Honda	Honda CBR 650R	
EVO	Copa Honda CBR 650R EVO	(Brazil) Maurício Laranjeira	(Brazil) Aikoa Racing	(Japan) Honda	Honda CBR 650R	
EVM	Copa Honda CBR 650R EVO Master	(Brazil) Rodrigo Medeiros	(Brazil) MM Motorsport	(Japan) Honda	Honda CBR 650R	
LTM	Copa Honda CBR 650R Light Master	(Brazil) Ayres Filho	(Brazil) MM Motorsport	(Japan) Honda	Honda CBR 650R	
ESC	Superbike Escola	(Brazil) Felipe Bittencourt	(Brazil) PCM/PRT	(Japan) Suzuki	Suzuki GSX-S1000	
EST	Superbike Estreante	(Argentina) Sebastian Bongiovanni	(Argentina) BGB Motorsports	(Japan) Kawasaki	Kawasaki Ninja ZX-10R	
CUP	Honda Junior Cup	(Brazil) João Teixeira	(Brazil) Certainty Racing	(Japan) Honda	Honda CG 160 Titan	
FEM	Honda Junior Cup Feminino	(Brazil) Giovana Brasil	(Brazil) Unifort	(Japan) Honda	Honda CG 160 Titan	

== See also ==
- SuperBike Brasil
- Moto 1000 GP
- Superbike World Championship
- Outline of motorcycles and motorcycling
- British Superbike Championship
- MotoAmerica
- AMA Superbike Championship
- All Japan Road Race Championship
- Australian Superbike Championship
- Grand Prix motorcycle racing
