= 2022 Brazilian Superbike Championship =

Motorcycle racing competition

The 2022 Brazilian Superbike Championship is the 13th edition of the Brazilian Superbike Championship.

== Calendar ==
Round	Date	Circuit	City
1	February 6	Autódromo Internacional de Interlagos	São Paulo, SP
2	April 24	Autódromo Internacional de Interlagos	São Paulo, SP
3	May 15	Autódromo Internacional de Interlagos	São Paulo, SP
4	June 19	Autódromo Internacional de Interlagos	São Paulo, SP
5	July 24	Autódromo Internacional de Interlagos	São Paulo, SP
6	August 28	Autódromo Internacional de Interlagos	São Paulo, SP
7	September 25	Autódromo Internacional Potenza	Lima Duarte, MG
8	October 23	Autódromo Internacional Ayrton Senna	Londrina, PR
9	November 20	Autódromo Ayrton Senna	Goiânia, GO
10	November 27	Autódromo Internacional de Interlagos	São Paulo, SP

== Results ==
=== Superbike ===
Round	Circuit	Date	Pole position	Fastest lap	Winning rider	Winning team	Winning constructor	Ref.
1	(São Paulo (state)) Autódromo Internacional de Interlagos	February 6	(Brazil) Pedro Sampaio	(Brazil) Pedro Sampaio	(Brazil) Guilherme Brito	(Brazil) Dezeró Racing	(Germany) BMW	
2	(São Paulo (state)) Autódromo Internacional de Interlagos	April 24	(Brazil) Joelsu Mitiko	(Brazil) Pedro Sampaio	Pedro Sampaio	(Brazil) Luvizotto Race Team	(Japan) Honda	
3	(São Paulo (state)) Autódromo Internacional de Interlagos	May 15	(Brazil) Pedro Sampaio	(Argentina) Ramiro Gandola	(Argentina) Ramiro Gandola	(Brazil) RXP/TRH Racing	(Germany) BMW	
4	(São Paulo (state)) Autódromo Internacional de Interlagos	June 19	(Brazil) Pedro Sampaio	(Argentina) Ramiro Gandola	(Argentina) Ramiro Gandola	(Brazil) RXP/TRH Racing	(Germany) BMW	
5	(São Paulo (state)) Autódromo Internacional de Interlagos	July 24	(Brazil) Pedro Sampaio	(Argentina) Ramiro Gandola	(Brazil) Pedro Sampaio	(Brazil) Luvizotto Race Team	(Japan) Honda	
6	(São Paulo (state)) Autódromo Internacional de Interlagos	August 28	(Argentina) Ramiro Gandola	(Brazil) Pedro Sampaio	(Argentina) Ramiro Gandola	(Brazil) RXP/TRH Racing	(Germany) BMW	
7	(Minas Gerais) Autódromo Internacional Potenza	September 25	(Brazil) Pedro Sampaio	(Argentina) Ramiro Gandola	(Brazil) Pedro Sampaio	(Brazil) Luvizotto Race Team	(Japan) Honda	
8	(Paraná (state)) Autódromo Internacional Ayrton Senna	October 23	(Brazil) Pedro Sampaio	(Brazil) Guilherme Brito	(Argentina) Ramiro Gandola	(Brazil) RXP/TRH Racing	(Germany) BMW	
9	(Goiás) Autódromo Ayrton Senna	November 20	(Brazil) Pedro Sampaio	(Argentina) Ramiro Gandola	(Brazil) Guilherme Brito	(Brazil) Dezeró Racing	(Germany) BMW	
10	(São Paulo (state)) Autódromo Internacional de Interlagos	November 27	(Brazil) Pedro Sampaio	(Brazil) Pedro Sampaio	(Argentina) Ramiro Gandola	(Brazil) RXP/TRH Racing	(Germany) BMW	

=== Superbike Light ===
Ronda	Circuito	Fecha	Pole Position	Vuelta rápida	Piloto ganador	Equipo ganador	Constructor	Ref.
1	(São Paulo (state)) Grande Prêmio de São Paulo	3 de febrero	(Brazil) Juninho Dez	(Brazil) Luís Bertoli	(Brazil) Luís Bertoli	(Brazil) JC Racing Team	(Japan) Kawasaki	
2	(São Paulo (state)) Grande Prêmio Petrobras	21 de abril	(Brazil) Peterson Pet	(Brazil) Osvaldo Jorge "Duende"	(Brazil) Osvaldo Jorge "Duende"	(Brazil) Duende Racing	(Japan) Kawasaki	
3	(São Paulo (state)) Grande Prêmio Elf	12 de mayo	(Brazil) Marcelo Skaf	(Brazil) Osvaldo Jorge "Duende"	(Brazil) Osvaldo Jorge "Duende"	(Brazil) Duende Racing	(Japan) Kawasaki	
4	(São Paulo (state)) Grande Prêmio Suhai	16 de junio	(Brazil) Luís Bertoli	(Brazil) Osvaldo Jorge "Duende"	(Brazil) Luís Bertoli	(Brazil) JC Racing Team	(Japan) Kawasaki	
5	(São Paulo (state)) Grande Prêmio Honda	21 de julio	(Brazil) Luís Bertoli	(Brazil) Juracy Rodrigues "Black"	(Brazil) Luís Bertoli	(Brazil) JC Racing Team	(Japan) Kawasaki	
6	(São Paulo (state)) Grande Prêmio dos Bandeirantes	25 de agosto	(Brazil) Marcelo Skaf	(Brazil) Marcelo Skaf	(Brazil) Marcelo Skaf	(Brazil) Racer X	(Japan) Kawasaki	
7	Grande Prêmio de Minas Gerais	22 de septiembre	(Brazil) Luís Bertoli	(Brazil) Luís Bertoli	(Brazil) Breno Pinto	(Brazil) PRT	(Japan) Yamaha	
8	(Paraná (state)) Grande Prêmio de Londrina	20 de octubre	(Brazil) Juracy Rodrigues "Black"	(Brazil) Luís Bertoli	(Brazil) Juracy Rodrigues "Black"	(Brazil) Tecfil Racing Team	(Japan) Kawasaki	
9	(Goiás) Grande Prêmio de Goiânia	17 de noviembre	(Brazil) Felipe Comerlatto	(Brazil) Wendel Vaz	(Brazil) Marcelo Skaf	(Brazil) Racer X	(Japan) Kawasaki	
10	(São Paulo (state)) Grande Prêmio de Interlagos	24 de noviembre	(Brazil) Felipe Comerlatto	(Brazil) Felipe Comerlatto	(Brazil) Felipe Comerlatto	(Brazil) Sport Plus Racing	(Germany) BMW	

=== Supersport 600 ===
Ronda	Circuito	Fecha	Pole Position	Vuelta rápida	Piloto ganador	Equipo ganador	Constructor	Ref.
1	(São Paulo (state)) Grande Prêmio de São Paulo	3 de febrero	(Argentina) Mauro Passarino	(Argentina) Mauro Passarino	(Argentina) Mauro Passarino	(Argentina) W2V MotorSport	(Japan) Kawasaki	
2	(São Paulo (state)) Grande Prêmio Petrobras	21 de abril	(Brazil) Felipe Gonçalves	(Brazil) Felipe Gonçalves	(Brazil) Felipe Gonçalves	(Brazil) HJC/ PSBK	(Japan) Kawasaki	
3	(São Paulo (state)) Grande Prêmio Elf	12 de mayo	(Brazil) Felipe Gonçalves	(Argentina) Mauro Passarino	(Brazil) Felipe Gonçalves	(Brazil) HJC/ PSBK	(Japan) Kawasaki	
4	(São Paulo (state)) Grande Prêmio Suhai	16 de junio	(Brazil) Felipe Gonçalves	(Brazil) Felipe Gonçalves	(Brazil) Felipe Gonçalves	(Brazil) HJC/ PSBK	(Japan) Kawasaki	
5	(São Paulo (state)) Grande Prêmio Honda	21 de julio	(Argentina) Mauro Passarino	(Argentina) Mauro Passarino	(Brazil) Théo Manna	(Brazil) PRT	(Japan) Kawasaki	
6	(São Paulo (state)) Grande Prêmio dos Bandeirantes	25 de agosto	(Brazil) Théo Manna	(Argentina) Franco Pandolfino	(Brazil) Théo Manna	(Brazil) PRT	(Japan) Kawasaki	
7	Grande Prêmio de Minas Gerais	22 de septiembre	(Argentina) Mauro Passarino	(Brazil) Felipe Gonçalves	(Argentina) Mauro Passarino	(Argentina) W2V MotorSport	(Japan) Kawasaki	
8	(Paraná (state)) Grande Prêmio de Londrina	20 de octubre	(Brazil) Felipe Gonçalves	(Brazil) Felipe Gonçalves	(Brazil) Felipe Gonçalves	(Brazil) HJC/ PSBK	(Japan) Kawasaki	
9	(Goiás) Grande Prêmio de Goiânia	17 de noviembre	(Argentina) Mauro Passarino	(Brazil) Felipe Gonçalves	(Argentina) Mauro Passarino	(Argentina) W2V MotorSport	(Japan) Kawasaki	
10	(São Paulo (state)) Grande Prêmio de Interlagos	24 de noviembre	(Argentina) Mauro Passarino	(Argentina) Mauro Passarino	(Argentina) Mauro Passarino	(Argentina) W2V MotorSport	(Japan) Kawasaki	

=== Supersport 400 ===
Ronda	Circuito	Fecha	Pole Position	Vuelta rápida	Piloto ganador	Equipo ganador	Constructor	Ref.
1	(São Paulo (state)) Grande Prêmio de São Paulo	3 de febrero	(Brazil) Gabrielly Lewis	(Brazil) João Arratia	(Brazil) João Arratia	(Brazil) HJC/ PSBK	(Japan) Kawasaki	
2	(São Paulo (state)) Grande Prêmio Petrobras	21 de abril	(Brazil) João Arratia	(Brazil) Lincoln Melo	(Brazil) Lincoln Melo	(Argentina) W2V Racing	(Japan) Kawasaki	
3	(São Paulo (state)) Grande Prêmio Elf	12 de mayo	(Brazil) João Arratia	(Brazil) João Arratia	(Brazil) João Arratia	(Brazil) HJC/ PSBK	(Japan) Kawasaki	
4	(São Paulo (state)) Grande Prêmio Suhai	16 de junio	(Brazil) João Arratia	(Brazil) Lincoln Melo	(Brazil) Lincoln Melo	(Argentina) W2V Racing	(Japan) Kawasaki	
5	(São Paulo (state)) Grande Prêmio Honda	21 de julio	(Brazil) Lincoln Melo	(Brazil) João Arratia	(Brazil) Lincoln Melo	(Argentina) W2V Racing	(Japan) Kawasaki	
6	(São Paulo (state)) Grande Prêmio dos Bandeirantes	25 de agosto	(Brazil) Lincoln Melo	(Brazil) João Arratia	(Argentina) Ezequiel Allende	(Argentina) W2V MotorSport	(Japan) Kawasaki	
7	Grande Prêmio de Minas Gerais	22 de septiembre	(Brazil) João Arratia	(Brazil) Daw Pereira	(Brazil) Lincoln Melo	(Argentina) W2V Racing	(Japan) Kawasaki	
8	(Paraná (state)) Grande Prêmio de Londrina	20 de octubre	(Brazil) Lincoln Melo	(Argentina) Ezequiel Allende	(Brazil) Guilherme Galan	(Brazil) G Racing Team	(Japan) Kawasaki	
9	(Goiás) Grande Prêmio de Goiânia	17 de noviembre	(Brazil) Gabrielly Lewis	(Brazil) Lincoln Melo	(Brazil) Lincoln Melo	(Argentina) W2V Racing	(Japan) Kawasaki	
10	(São Paulo (state)) Grande Prêmio de Interlagos	24 de noviembre	(Brazil) Mário Salles	(Brazil) Mário Salles	(Brazil) Mário Salles	(Brazil) RXP/TRH Racing	(Japan) Kawasaki	

=== Copa Honda CBR 650R ===
Ronda	Circuito	Fecha	Pole Position	Vuelta rápida	Piloto ganador	Equipo ganador	Constructor	Ref.
1	(São Paulo (state)) Grande Prêmio de São Paulo	3 de febrero	(Brazil) João Carneiro	(Brazil) João Carneiro	(Brazil) João Carneiro	(Brazil) Cajuru Racing	(Japan) Honda	
2	(São Paulo (state)) Grande Prêmio Petrobras	21 de abril	(Brazil) João Carneiro	(Brazil) João Carneiro	(Brazil) João Carneiro	(Brazil) Cajuru Racing	(Japan) Honda	
3	(São Paulo (state)) Grande Prêmio Elf	12 de mayo	(Brazil) João Carneiro	(Brazil) João Carneiro	(Brazil) João Carneiro	(Brazil) Cajuru Racing	(Japan) Honda	
4	(São Paulo (state)) Grande Prêmio Suhai	16 de junio	(Brazil) João Carneiro	(Brazil) João Carneiro	(Brazil) João Carneiro	(Brazil) Cajuru Racing	(Japan) Honda	
5	(São Paulo (state)) Grande Prêmio Honda	21 de julio	(Brazil) João Carneiro	(Brazil) João Carneiro	(Brazil) João Carneiro	(Brazil) Cajuru Racing	(Japan) Honda	
6	(São Paulo (state)) Grande Prêmio dos Bandeirantes	25 de agosto	(Brazil) João Carneiro	(Brazil) João Carneiro	(Brazil) João Carneiro	(Brazil) Cajuru Racing	(Japan) Honda	
7	Grande Prêmio de Minas Gerais	22 de septiembre	(Brazil) João Carneiro	(Brazil) João Carneiro	(Brazil) João Carneiro	(Brazil) Cajuru Racing	(Japan) Honda	
8	(Paraná (state)) Grande Prêmio de Londrina	20 de octubre	(Brazil) João Carneiro	(Brazil) João Carneiro	(Brazil) João Carneiro	(Brazil) Cajuru Racing	(Japan) Honda	
9	(Goiás) Grande Prêmio de Goiânia	17 de noviembre	(Brazil) João Carneiro	(Brazil) João Carneiro	(Brazil) João Carneiro	(Brazil) Cajuru Racing	(Japan) Honda	
10	(São Paulo (state)) Grande Prêmio de Interlagos	24 de noviembre	(Brazil) João Carneiro	(Brazil) João Carneiro	(Brazil) João Carneiro	(Brazil) Cajuru Racing	(Japan) Honda	

=== Superbike Escola ===
Ronda	Circuito	Fecha	Pole Position	Vuelta rápida	Piloto ganador	Equipo ganador	Constructor	Ref.
1	(São Paulo (state)) Grande Prêmio de São Paulo	3 de febrero	(Brazil) Felipe Pan	(Brazil) Vanderlei Pinho	(Brazil) Vanderlei Pinho	(Brazil) Tecfil Racing Team	(Germany) BMW	
2	(São Paulo (state)) Grande Prêmio Petrobras	21 de abril	(Brazil) Felipe Pan	(Brazil) Márcio Pacheco	(Brazil) Márcio Pacheco	(Brazil) RXP/TRH Racing	(Germany) BMW	
3	(São Paulo (state)) Grande Prêmio Elf	12 de mayo	(Brazil) Vanderlei Pinho	(Brazil) Alex Barbosa	(Brazil) Vanderlei Pinho	(Brazil) Tecfil Racing Team	(Germany) BMW	
4	(São Paulo (state)) Grande Prêmio Suhai	16 de junio	(Brazil) Felipe Pan	(Brazil) Alex Barbosa	(Brazil) Alex Barbosa	(Brazil) Koube Motonil Motors	(Germany) BMW	
5	(São Paulo (state)) Grande Prêmio Honda	21 de julio	(Brazil) Felipe Pan	(Brazil) Alex Barbosa	(Uruguay) Adolfo Maciel "Uruguaio"	(Brazil) RXP/TRH Racing	(Germany) BMW	
6	(São Paulo (state)) Grande Prêmio dos Bandeirantes	25 de agosto	(Brazil) Alex Barbosa	(Brazil) Alex Barbosa	(Brazil) Alex Barbosa	(Brazil) Koube Motonil Motors	(Germany) BMW	
7	Grande Prêmio de Minas Gerais	22 de septiembre	(Brazil) Vanderlei Pinho	(Brazil) Vanderlei Pinho	(Brazil) Vanderlei Pinho	(Brazil) Tecfil Racing Team	(Germany) BMW	
8	(Paraná (state)) Grande Prêmio de Londrina	20 de octubre	(Brazil) Vanderlei Pinho	(Brazil) Vanderlei Pinho	(Brazil) Vanderlei Pinho	(Brazil) Tecfil Racing Team	(Germany) BMW	
9	(Goiás) Grande Prêmio de Goiânia	17 de noviembre	(Brazil) Vanderlei Pinho	(Brazil) Vanderlei Pinho	(Brazil) Vanderlei Pinho	(Brazil) Tecfil Racing Team	(Germany) BMW	
10	(São Paulo (state)) Grande Prêmio de Interlagos	24 de noviembre	(Brazil) Vanderlei Pinho	(Brazil) Alex Barbosa	(Brazil) Anderson Costa	(Brazil) Tamujunto Racing Team	(Japan) Honda	

=== Supersport 400 Escola ===
Ronda	Circuito	Fecha	Pole Position	Vuelta rápida	Piloto ganador	Equipo ganador	Constructor	Ref.
1	(São Paulo (state)) Grande Prêmio de São Paulo	3 de febrero	(Brazil) Andressa Rosa	(Brazil) Jordan Ribeiro	(Brazil) Iolando Maciel	(Brazil) Dezeró Racing	(Japan) Yamaha	
2	(São Paulo (state)) Grande Prêmio Petrobras	21 de abril	(Brazil) Charles França	(Brazil) Charles França	(Brazil) Iolando Maciel	(Brazil) Dezeró Racing	(Japan) Yamaha	
3	(São Paulo (state)) Grande Prêmio Elf	12 de mayo	(Brazil) Charles França	(Brazil) Charles França	(Brazil) Felipe Ardel	(Brazil) Kings SE Racing Team	(Japan) Kawasaki	
4	(São Paulo (state)) Grande Prêmio Suhai	16 de junio	(Brazil) Jemerson Medeiros	(Brazil) Caio Lopes	(Brazil) Caio Lopes	(France) DS Performance	(Japan) Kawasaki	
5	(São Paulo (state)) Grande Prêmio Honda	21 de julio	(Brazil) Ricardo "Preguinho"	(Brazil) Paulinho PJ	(Brazil) Devid Minho	(Brazil) Team.racing22	(Japan) Kawasaki	
6	(São Paulo (state)) Grande Prêmio dos Bandeirantes	25 de agosto	(Brazil) Iolando Maciel	(Brazil) Éverton dos Santos	(Brazil) Charles França	(Brazil) Kings SE Racing Team	(Japan) Kawasaki	
7	Grande Prêmio de Minas Gerais	22 de septiembre	(Brazil) Charles França	(Brazil) Charles França	(Brazil) Paulinho PJ	(Brazil) Garage 74/PSBK	(Japan) Kawasaki	
8	(Paraná (state)) Grande Prêmio de Londrina	20 de octubre	(Brazil) Paulinho PJ	(Brazil) Paulinho PJ	(Brazil) Paulinho PJ	(Brazil) Garage 74/PSBK	(Japan) Kawasaki	
9	(Goiás) Grande Prêmio de Goiânia	17 de noviembre	(Brazil) Iolando Maciel	(Brazil) Iolando Maciel	(Brazil) Iolando Maciel	(Brazil) Dezeró Racing	(Japan) Yamaha	
10	(São Paulo (state)) Grande Prêmio de Interlagos	24 de noviembre	(Brazil) Iolando Maciel	(Brazil) Charles França	(Brazil) Iolando Maciel	(Brazil) Dezeró Racing	(Japan) Yamaha	

=== Honda Junior Cup ===
Ronda	Circuito	Fecha	Pole Position	Vuelta rápida	Piloto ganador	Equipo ganador	Constructor	Ref.
1	(São Paulo (state)) Grande Prêmio de São Paulo	3 de febrero	(Brazil) Murilo Gomes Silva	(Brazil) Miguel Garcia	(Brazil) Miguel Garcia	(Argentina) Koopman Racing	(Japan) Honda	
2	(São Paulo (state)) Grande Prêmio Petrobras	21 de abril	(Brazil) Miguel Garcia	(Brazil) Leonardo Marques Barbim	(Brazil) Enzo Ximenes	(Brazil) HD Racing	(Japan) Honda	
3	(São Paulo (state)) Grande Prêmio Elf	12 de mayo	(Brazil) Leonardo Marques Barbim	(Brazil) Enzo Ximenes	(Brazil) Leonardo Marques Barbim	(Brazil) Spirit Racing	(Japan) Honda	
4	(São Paulo (state)) Grande Prêmio Suhai	16 de junio	(Brazil) Leonardo Marques Barbim	(Brazil) Leonardo Marques Barbim	(Brazil) Leonardo Marques Barbim	(Brazil) Spirit Racing	(Japan) Honda	
5	(São Paulo (state)) Grande Prêmio Honda	21 de julio	(Brazil) Leonardo Marques Barbim	(Brazil) Leonardo Marques Barbim	(Brazil) Leonardo Marques Barbim	(Brazil) Spirit Racing	(Japan) Honda	
6	(São Paulo (state)) Grande Prêmio dos Bandeirantes	25 de agosto	(Brazil) Enzo Ximenes	(Brazil) Leonardo Marques Barbim	(Brazil) Vítor Hugo	(Brazil) Traxx Racing Team	(Japan) Honda	
7	Grande Prêmio de Minas Gerais	22 de septiembre	(Brazil) Leonardo Marques Barbim	(Brazil) Leonardo Marques Barbim	(Brazil) Leonardo Marques Barbim	(Brazil) Spirit Racing	(Japan) Honda	
8	(Paraná (state)) Grande Prêmio de Londrina	20 de octubre	(Brazil) Vítor Hugo	(Brazil) Leonardo Marques Barbim	(Brazil) Leonardo Marques Barbim	(Brazil) Spirit Racing	(Japan) Honda	
9	(Goiás) Grande Prêmio de Goiânia	17 de noviembre	(Brazil) Enzo Ximenes	(Brazil) Vítor Hugo	(Brazil) Leonardo Marques Barbim	(Brazil) Spirit Racing	(Japan) Honda	
10	(São Paulo (state)) Grande Prêmio de Interlagos	24 de noviembre	(Brazil) Enzo Ximenes	(Brazil) Enzo Ximenes	(Brazil) Enzo Ximenes	(Brazil) HD Racing	(Japan) Honda	

== Standings ==
Classifications for the Brazilian Superbike Championship

=== Superbike ===
Icon	Class
PRO	PRO
EVO	EVO

Pos.	River	Moto	Class	(São Paulo (state)) SPO	(São Paulo (state)) PET	(São Paulo (state)) ELF	(São Paulo (state)) SUH	(São Paulo (state)) HON	(São Paulo (state)) BAN	(Minas Gerais) MGS	(Paraná (state)) LON	(Goiás) GOI	(São Paulo (state)) INT	Pts
1	(Brazil) Pedro Sampaio	Honda	PRO	9	1	2	2	1	2	1	3	2	2	209
2	(Argentina) Ramiro Gandola	BMW	PRO	Ret	2	1	1	12	1	2	1	Ret	1	175
3	(Brazil) Guilherme Brito	BMW	PRO	1		6	5	2	4	4	2	1	3	153
4	(Brazil) Rafael Paschoalin	Honda	PRO	4	4	7	3	3	3	3	4	3	4	142
5	(Brazil) Leonardo Tamburro	Kawasaki	PRO	3	5	5			6	5	5	4	5	97
6	(Brazil) Manow Martins	Kawasaki	EVO	10	12	4	4	6	8	6	6	10		80
7	(Brazil) Júlio Fortunato	BMW	PRO	7		8	6	4	5	8	7	5	DNQ	79
8	(Brazil) Raphael Santos	BMW	EVO	5	8	9	7	7	11	7	Ret	Ret	6	68
9	(Brazil) André Veríssimo	Kawasaki	EVO	8	7	10	18	8	7	9	Ret	6	9	64
10	(Brazil) Joelsu Mitiko	Kawasaki	PRO	2	3	3	9							59
11	(Brazil) Victor Villaverde	BMW	EVO	6	10	11	11	11						31
12	(Brazil) Rafael Palmieri "Rizada"	Kawasaki	EVO		11	12						8	8	25
13	(Brazil) Gustavo Manso	BMW	PRO				8	5	DNS					19
14	(Brazil) Juracy Rodrigues "Black"	BMW	PRO				12	10	9	Ret	DNS	DNS		17
15	(Brazil) Christian Simonit	Kawasaki	EVO				16			10	9			13
16	(Argentina) Adrián Gutierrez	Ducati	PRO					13		11	10			13
17	(Uruguay) Maximiliano Gerardo	Yamaha	PRO	Ret						12	8		Ret	12
18	(Brazil) Rodrigo Dazzi	BMW	EVO					9			11			12
19	(Brazil) Mauriti Ribeiro Jr	BMW	PRO		6									10
20	(Brazil) Osvaldo Jorge "Duende"	Kawasaki	EVO										7	9
21	(Brazil) Wendell Vaz	BMW	EVO									7		9
22	(Brazil) Lucas Barros	BMW	EVO		9	Ret								7
23	(Brazil) Iovandes Menezes	BMW	PRO									9		7
24	(Brazil) Fábio Pitta	BMW	EVO				15		10			DSQ		7
25	(Brazil) Beto Auad	Kawasaki	PRO				10			NC				6
26	(Brazil) Luís Bertoli	Kawasaki	EVO				Ret		12				NC	4
27	(Brazil) Breno Pinto	Yamaha	PRO				13		Ret					3
28	(Brazil) Rodrigo Simon	Honda	PRO				14							2
29	(Brazil) Cléverson Oliveira	BMW	EVO				17							0
30	(Brazil) Marcelo Skaf	Kawasaki	PRO		Ret	Ret	Ret					Ret	Ret	0
31	(Brazil) Felipe Comerlatto	BMW	EVO	DNS				Ret	Ret	DNS			DNQ	0
32	(Argentina) Facundo Medina	Yamaha	EVO	Ret									Ret	0
33	(Brazil) Murilo Tom	BMW	EVO								Ret			0
34	(Brazil) Peterson Pet	BMW	PRO				Ret							0
35	(Brazil) Flávio Trevizan	Ducati	EVO					DSQ						0
Pos	Rider	Moto	Class	(São Paulo (state)) SPO	(São Paulo (state)) PET	(São Paulo (state)) ELF	(São Paulo (state)) SUH	(São Paulo (state)) HON	(São Paulo (state)) BAN	(Minas Gerais) MGS	(Paraná (state)) LON	(Goiás) GOI	(São Paulo (state)) INT	Pts

Colour	Result
Gold	Winner
Silver	Second place
Bronze	Third place
Green	Points classification
Blue	Non-points classification
Blue	Non-classified finish (NC)
Purple	Retired, not classified (Ret)
Red	Did not qualify (DNQ)
Red	Did not pre-qualify (DNPQ)
Black	Disqualified (DSQ)
White	Did not start (DNS)
White	Withdrew (WD)
White	Race cancelled (C)
Blank	Did not practice (DNP)
Blank	Did not arrive (DNA)
Blank	Excluded (EX)

=== Constructors' standings ===
Pos	Constructor	(São Paulo (state)) SPO	(São Paulo (state)) PET	(São Paulo (state)) ELF	(São Paulo (state)) SUH	(São Paulo (state)) HON	(São Paulo (state)) BAN	(Minas Gerais) MGS	(Paraná (state)) LON	(Goiás) GOI	(São Paulo (state)) INT	Pts
1	(Germany) BMW	1	2	1	1	2	1	2	1	1	1	235
2	(Japan) Honda	4	1	2	2	1	2	1	3	2	2	204
3	(Japan) Kawasaki	2	3	3	4	6	6	5	5	4	5	131
4	(Japan) Yamaha	Ret			13		Ret	12	8		Ret	15
5	(Italy) Ducati					13		11	10			14
Pos	Constructor	(São Paulo (state)) SPO	(São Paulo (state)) PET	(São Paulo (state)) ELF	(São Paulo (state)) SUH	(São Paulo (state)) HON	(São Paulo (state)) BAN	(Minas Gerais) MGS	(Paraná (state)) LON	(Goiás) GOI	(São Paulo (state)) INT	Pts

=== Superbike Light ===
Icon	Class
LGT	Light
MAS	Master
SEN	Master Senior

Pos.	River	Moto	Class	(São Paulo (state)) SPO	(São Paulo (state)) PET	(São Paulo (state)) ELF	(São Paulo (state)) SUH	(São Paulo (state)) HON	(São Paulo (state)) BAN	(Minas Gerais) MGS	(Paraná (state)) LON	(Goiás) GOI	(São Paulo (state)) INT	Pts
1	(Brazil) Luís Bertoli	Kawasaki	LGT	1	Ret	2	1	1	2	Ret	2	17	2	168
2	(Brazil) Felipe Comerlatto	BMW	LGT	4	5	Ret	3	5	4	2	3	2	1	159
3	(Brazil) Juracy Rodrigues "Black"	Kawasaki	MAS	2	18	3	4	2	3	3	1	Ret		126
4	(Brazil) Luís Ferraz	BMW	LGT	3	7	4	6	4	5	INF	8	3	6	120
5	(Brazil) Osvaldo Jorge "Duende"	Kawasaki	LGT		1	1	2	3		11	4	NQ		115
6	(Brazil) Peterson Pet	BMW	LGT	5	3	5	5	19	8	8	9	8	4	109
7	(Brazil) Lucas Bessa	Honda	LGT	9	14	6	DSQ	7	9	4	6	7	7	88
8	(Brazil) Felipe Bittencourt	Suzuki	LGT	6	8	7	9	8	12	5	12	11	11	86
9	(Brazil) Breno Pinto	Yamaha	LGT		6	DNQ	8		7	1		6	Ret	65
10	(Brazil) Édson Luiz Mamute	Suzuki	MAS	8	9	8	7	11	11	6	Ret	9	DNQ	59
11	(Brazil) Pablo Flores Nunes	Suzuki	MAS	12	11	9	13	9	10	7		10	9	54
12	(Brazil) Marcelo Skaf	Kawasaki	LGT		Ret	Ret	Ret	Ret	1	Ret		1	Ret	52
13	(Brazil) Victor Villaverde	BMW	LGT						6	DNF	5	5	5	46
14	(Brazil) Serginho Aparecido da Silva	Yamaha	LGT	10	15	DNQ	Ret	15	14	9	Ret	NPQ	10	39
15	(Brazil) Alex Souza	Kawasaki	LGT	7	4	Ret	12		DNS	Ret				35
16	(Brazil) Cléverson Oliveira	BMW	MAS	16	12	11	11	12	Ret	10	10	13	12	37
17	(Brazil) Christian Simonit	Kawasaki	LGT	17	13	10	15	13	DNS					32
18	(Brazil) Rodrigo Simon	Honda	LGT	13		Ret	10	21				12	8	32
19	(Brazil) Wesley Lima	BMW	LGT					6					3	27
20	(Brazil) Fábio Pitta	BMW	LGT				14	10	Wth		11	18		24
21	(Brazil) Juliano Ferrante	Kawasaki	LGT		2									20
22	(Brazil) Sérgio Prates	BMW	LGT			Ret						15	13	15
23	(Brazil) Leandro Nexo	BMW	LGT	15	10	Ret	16	14						13
24	(Brazil) Wendel Vaz	BMW	LGT									4		13
25	(Brazil) Tiago Dellanegra	BMW	LGT							15	15	21		13
26	(Brazil) Édson Errera	Honda	SEN	14	16	12	18	16	16	16	16	19	14	11
27	(Brazil) Oswaldo Barrueco	BMW	LGT								7			10
28	(Brazil) Nelson Gonçalves "Mágico"	BMW	SEN	18	17	14	17	18	17	12	14	16	DNQ	10
29	(Brazil) Elson Tenebra Otero	Suzuki	SEN		19			17	15	13	13	14	16	9
30	(Brazil) Rafael Maranhão	BMW	LGT							14				8
31	(Brazil) Rodrigo Hayashi	Kawasaki	LGT						13					6
32	(Brazil) Chrystian Quick	Honda	MAS	11	20									5
33	(Brazil) Juninho Dez	Kawasaki	LGT	19	DNQ								DNS	5
34	(Brazil) Iovandes Menezes	BMW	LGT									20		2
35	(Brazil) Emerson Coelho	Ducati	MAS					20	18				15	1
36	(Brazil) Carlos Barcelos	Suzuki	MAS					22						0
37	(Brazil) Luiz Roberto Nucci Ziliani	Ducati	MAS	Ret										0
38	(Argentina) Leandro Fernández	Ducati	LGT										Ret	0
39	(Brazil) Jefferson Bezerra	Kawasaki	LGT	DNS			NC							0
Pos	Piloto	Moto	Clase	(São Paulo (state)) SPO	(São Paulo (state)) PET	(São Paulo (state)) ELF	(São Paulo (state)) SUH	(São Paulo (state)) HON	(São Paulo (state)) BAN	(Minas Gerais) MGS	(Paraná (state)) LON	(Goiás) GOI	(São Paulo (state)) INT	Pts

Colour	Result
Gold	Winner
Silver	Second place
Bronze	Third place
Green	Points classification
Blue	Non-points classification
Blue	Non-classified finish (NC)
Purple	Retired, not classified (Ret)
Red	Did not qualify (DNQ)
Red	Did not pre-qualify (DNPQ)
Black	Disqualified (DSQ)
White	Did not start (DNS)
White	Withdrew (WD)
White	Race cancelled (C)
Blank	Did not practice (DNP)
Blank	Did not arrive (DNA)
Blank	Excluded (EX)

=== Constructors' standings ===
Pos	Constructor	(São Paulo (state)) SPO	(São Paulo (state)) PET	(São Paulo (state)) ELF	(São Paulo (state)) SUH	(São Paulo (state)) HON	(São Paulo (state)) BAN	(Minas Gerais) MGS	(Paraná (state)) LON	(Goiás) GOI	(São Paulo (state)) INT	Pts
1	(Japan) Kawasaki	1	1	1	1	1	1	3	1	1	2	236
2	(Germany) BMW	3	3	4	3	4	4	2	3	2	1	168
3	(Japan) Suzuki	6	8	7	7	8	10	5	12	9	9	79
4	(Japan) Honda	9	14	6	DSQ	7	9	4	6	7	7	76
5	(Japan) Yamaha	10	6	DNQ	8	15	7	1	Ret	6	10	75
6	(Italy) Ducati	Ret				20	18				15	1
Pos	Constructor	(São Paulo (state)) SPO	(São Paulo (state)) PET	(São Paulo (state)) ELF	(São Paulo (state)) SUH	(São Paulo (state)) HON	(São Paulo (state)) BAN	(Minas Gerais) MGS	(Paraná (state)) LON	(Goiás) GOI	(São Paulo (state)) INT	Pts

=== Supersport 600 ===
Icon	Class
PRO	PRO
EVO	EVO
PEV	PRO EVO
EST	Estreante

Pos.	River	Moto	Class	(São Paulo (state)) SPO	(São Paulo (state)) PET	(São Paulo (state)) ELF	(São Paulo (state)) SUH	(São Paulo (state)) HON	(São Paulo (state)) BAN	(Minas Gerais) MGS	(Paraná (state)) LON	(Goiás) GOI	(São Paulo (state)) INT	Pts
1	(Brazil) Felipe Gonçalves	Kawasaki	PRO	4	1	1	1	2	3	3	1	2	7	194
2	(Brazil) Théo Manna	Kawasaki	PRO	6	3	2	3	1	1	2	3	3	2	186
3	(Argentina) Mauro Passarino	Kawasaki	PRO	1	4	9	4	30	2	1	2	1	1	173
4	(Brazil) Lucas Torres	Kawasaki	PRO	3	2	3	2	3	DNQ	4	5	6	DNQ	122
5	(Brazil) Victor Durval Careca	Kawasaki	PRO	8	6	10	6	5	7	11	8	10	6	83
6	(Argentina) Franco Pandolfino	Kawasaki	PEV	18	8	12	8	6	10	6	7	8	5	74
7	(Brazil) Felipe Macan	Kawasaki	PRO	7	Ret	4	5	37	Ret		4	5	3	73
8	(Brazil) Enzo Maccapani	Kawasaki	PRO			6	12	4	5	Ret	6	7	4	70
X	(Brazil) Mauro Thomassini	Kawasaki	EVO	9	10	7	9	7	8	9	11	15	8	67
9	(Paraguay) Pedro Valiente	Yamaha	PEV		5	5		21	6	5	17	22	11	48
10	(Brazil) Diego Viveiros	Kawasaki	PEV	11	9	8	10	19	DSQ	8	9	12	17	45
11	(Brazil) Ronaldo "Tutti" Ranieri	Kawasaki	EVO	Ret	12	14	15	10	14	12	14	11	9	29
12	(Brazil) Pedro Kamikaze	Kawasaki	PEV	10	Ret	11	11	9	12				DNF	27
13	(Brazil) Eduardo Burr	Yamaha	PRO						4			4		26
14	(Brazil) Júlio César Parra	Kawasaki	PEV		7			8	11				Ret	22
15	(Brazil) Luís Armando Boechat	Kawasaki	EVO	14	11	13	13	32	19	13	13	13	DNQ	22
16	(Brazil) Gustavo Manso	Kawasaki	PRO	2										20
17	(Brazil) Gabriel Silva	Yamaha	EVO	28	17	17	17	13	15	10	12	18	10	20
18	(Brazil) Daniel Gurgel	Kawasaki	PEV				7		9				Ret	16
19	(Brazil) Rubens Mesquita	Kawasaki	PRO	5										11
20	(Brazil) Paulo Foroni	Kawasaki	EVO	15	13	20	14	16	20	Ret	19	16	12	10
21	(Brazil) Marcelo Skaf	Kawasaki	PEV					31		7				9
22	(Brazil) Paulo Joe King	Kawasaki	EVO	12				11						9
23	(Brazil) Marcos Fortunato	Kawasaki	EVO	16	15	15	19	12	13	18	18	17	DNF	9
24	(Brazil) Jonas Vieira McDonalds	Kawasaki	EVO	13	14	21	16	15	17	17	16	14	18	8
25	(Brazil) Régis Santos	Kawasaki	PEV									9		7
26	(Brazil) Valmir Monteiro	Kawasaki	EVO								10			6
27	(Brazil) Gérson Caleb	Kawasaki	EVO		24	16	22	33	16				13	3
28	(Brazil) Júnio Roberto Bereta	Triumph	EST	23	19	18	18	17	23	14	15	21	19	3
29	(Brazil) Luiz Imparato	Kawasaki	EVO	DNS	20	22	20	20	18			19	14	2
30	(Brazil) Itamar Quadros	Kawasaki	EST					14						2
31	(Brazil) Marcos Kawasaki	Kawasaki	EVO	25	23	Ret	24	29	31	21	Ret	23	15	1
32	(Brazil) Luciano Charles	Kawasaki	EST	29		DNS	26		30	15		24	NQ	1
33	(Brazil) Marco Theodoro	Kawasaki	EST	19	21	19	23	18	21	16	20	20	Ret	0
34	(Argentina) Leandro Fernández	Kawasaki	EVO				30	36	Ret	22	22		16	0
35	(Brazil) Thirsen Mourão	Yamaha	EST	24	16	INF		24	27				22	0
36	(Brazil) Rodrigo Medeiros	Kawasaki	EVO	17										0
37	(Brazil) Guilherme M. de Assis	Kawasaki	EST		18	23		23						0
38	(Brazil) Dú Rodrigues	Ducati	EST							19	Ret			0
39	(Brazil) Douglas Russo	Kawasaki	EVO	Ret	27	DSQ	25	25	29	20	21	Ret		0
40	(Brazil) Fabrício Bandeira	Kawasaki	EST	20	28	Ret	21	22	25					0
41	(Brazil) Diego Dortti	Honda	EST				29	35					20	0
42	(Brazil) Pierre Balducci	Kawasaki	EST					34	32				21	0
43	(Brazil) Reinaldo Baggio	Kawasaki	EST	21										0
44	(Brazil) Walter Becker	Triumph	EST	27	22	24		26	22				Ret	0
45	(Brazil) Cléber Araújo "Rei do Iphone"	Triumph	EST	22					28				23	0
46	(Brazil) Felipe Martinuzzo	Kawasaki	EST					NC	24				24	0
47	(Brazil) Fernando Brutus	Kawasaki	EST	DNQ	25	25	28							0
48	(Brazil) Bryan Nascimento	Kawasaki	EST										25	0
49	(Brazil) Rodrigo Salioni	Kawasaki	EST									25		0
50	(Brazil) Allan Josefh Martins	Triumph	EST		26	Ret	27	27	26				26	0
51	(Brazil) Rodrigo Pacheco	Triumph	EST	26				28						0
52	(Brazil) Berlim Weber	Triumph	EST						Ret				27	0
53	(Brazil) Mauro Rodrigues	Kawasaki	EST										28	0
54	(Brazil) Michael Valtingojer	Kawasaki	PRO		29									0
55	(Brazil) Ernani Stock	Kawasaki	EST										29	0
56	(Brazil) Gustavo Gadelha	Honda	EST				Ret						30	0
57	(Brazil) Amauri Jr	Kawasaki	EST										31	0
58	(Brazil) Patrick Wittich	Kawasaki	EST										32	0
59	(Brazil) Jair Gabriel	Kawasaki	EST					Ret	Ret			DNS	NC	0
60	(Brazil) Thiago Eduardo	Kawasaki	EVO										NC	0
61	(Brazil) Gustavo Silveira "Gão"	Kawasaki	PRO										Ret	0
62	(Brazil) Marcelo Berlin	Triumph	EST	Ret										0
63	(Brazil) Leandro Pardini	Kawasaki	EVO										DNQ	0
Pos	Piloto	Moto	Clase	(São Paulo (state)) SPO	(São Paulo (state)) PET	(São Paulo (state)) ELF	(São Paulo (state)) SUH	(São Paulo (state)) HON	(São Paulo (state)) BAN	(Minas Gerais) MGS	(Paraná (state)) LON	(Goiás) GOI	(São Paulo (state)) INT	Pts

Colour	Result
Gold	Winner
Silver	Second place
Bronze	Third place
Green	Points classification
Blue	Non-points classification
Blue	Non-classified finish (NC)
Purple	Retired, not classified (Ret)
Red	Did not qualify (DNQ)
Red	Did not pre-qualify (DNPQ)
Black	Disqualified (DSQ)
White	Did not start (DNS)
White	Withdrew (WD)
White	Race cancelled (C)
Blank	Did not practice (DNP)
Blank	Did not arrive (DNA)
Blank	Excluded (EX)

NOTA: SuperBike Brasil declared Ronaldo “Tutti” Ranieri the champion of the SuperSport 600cc EVO category for the 2022 season. The confirmation of the result was postponed due to an appeal submitted to the Superior Sports Court of Justice (STJD).

=== Constructors' standings ===
Pos	Constructor	(São Paulo (state)) SPO	(São Paulo (state)) PET	(São Paulo (state)) ELF	(São Paulo (state)) SUH	(São Paulo (state)) HON	(São Paulo (state)) BAN	(Minas Gerais) MGS	(Paraná (state)) LON	(Goiás) GOI	(São Paulo (state)) INT	Pts
1	(Japan) Kawasaki	1	1	1	1	1	1	1	1	1	1	250
2	(Japan) Yamaha	24	5	5	17	13	4	5	12	4	10	61
3	(United Kingdom) Triumph	22	19	18	18	17	23	14	15	21	19	3
4	(Italy) Ducati							19	Ret			0
5	(Japan) Honda				29	35					20	0
Pos	Constructor	(São Paulo (state)) SPO	(São Paulo (state)) PET	(São Paulo (state)) ELF	(São Paulo (state)) SUH	(São Paulo (state)) HON	(São Paulo (state)) BAN	(Minas Gerais) MGS	(Paraná (state)) LON	(Goiás) GOI	(São Paulo (state)) INT	Pts

=== Supersport 400 ===
Icon	Class
NJA	Ninja 400 Cup
MAS	Master
R3	R3 Cup

Pos.	River	Moto	Class	(São Paulo (state)) SPO	(São Paulo (state)) PET	(São Paulo (state)) ELF	(São Paulo (state)) SUH	(São Paulo (state)) HON	(São Paulo (state)) BAN	(Minas Gerais) MGS	(Paraná (state)) LON	(Goiás) GOI	(São Paulo (state)) INT	Pts
1	(Brazil) João Arratia	Kawasaki	NJA	1	2	1	2	2	2	18	3	2	3	182
2	(Brazil) Lincoln Melo	Kawasaki	NJA	2	1	2	1	1	13	1	DSQ	1	5	179
3	(Brazil) Pedro Foroni	Kawasaki	NJA	4	5	DSQ	5	3	5	Ret	2	4	Ret	95
4	(Brazil) Gabrielly Lewis	Kawasaki	NJA	3	Ret	3	3		4	14	DSQ	Ret	2	83
5	(Brazil) Fabinho da Hornet	Kawasaki	MAS	10	13	5	10	Ret	11	10	11	7	9	78
6	(Brazil) Fabrício Zamperetti	Kawasaki	MAS	9	4		6	5	7	6		3		76
7	(Brazil) João Fascinelli	Yamaha	R3	5	6		7	6	6	5		5		72
8	(Brazil) Bruno Brito	Kawasaki	NJA	12	12	4	9		9	9	9	16	6	59
9	(Brazil) Bruno Ribeiro	Kawasaki	NJA		3		4	4	10					48
10	(Brazil) Brayann Ligeirinho	Yamaha	R3	6	10		12	7	12	8				41
11	(Brazil) Heitor Ourinho	Yamaha	R3	14	17	9	15	9	22	12	7	11	11	40
12	(Brazil) Guilherme Fernandes	Kawasaki	NJA						17	4	5		4	37
13	(Brazil) Daw Pereira	Kawasaki	MAS						3	2		Ret		36
14	(Brazil) Caio Baldoíno	Yamaha	R3	17	19	10	19	12	16	11	8	12	7	36
15	(Argentina) Ezequiel Allende	Kawasaki	NJA						1		6		Ret	35
16	(Brazil) Werley Campelo	Kawasaki	NJA	7	9	7						6		34
17	(Brazil) Ana Lima	Kawasaki	NJA	DNS		6	8	8	Ret					26
18	(Brazil) Mário Salles	Kawasaki	NJA										1	25
19	(Brazil) Guilherme Galan	Kawasaki	NJA								1			25
20	(Brazil) Murilo Gomes Silva	Yamaha	R3	19				18	19	13	10	8	10	23
21	(Brazil) Léo Marques	Kawasaki	NJA	18	DSQ	8	16	DSQ	15	Ret	DSQ	10	12	19
22	(Brazil) Jorge Jr	Kawasaki	NJA	8	14		14	10						18
23	(Brazil) Gustavo Manso	Yamaha	R3							3		DSQ		16
24	(Argentina) Lucas Gutiérrez	Kawasaki	NJA				11	Ret	Ret	7	Ret			14
25	(Brazil) Osmar Gonçalves	Kawasaki	MAS	11	7									14
26	(Argentina) Gustavo Martínez	Kawasaki	NJA								4			13
27	(Argentina) Nicolas Torrez	Yamaha	R3		18	11	Ret	19	20	16	13	13	14	13
28	(Brazil) João Teixeira	Yamaha	R3	15	16		17	15	18	15		9		10
29	(Brazil) Fernanda Lopes Marçon	Yamaha	R3	20	20	12	20	20	23	17	14	14	15	9
30	(Brazil) Guto Figueiredo	Kawasaki	NJA		8									8
31	(Brazil) Deivid Minho	Kawasaki	NJA						8					8
32	(Brazil) Léo Henry	Kawasaki	NJA										8	8
33	(Argentina) Matias Amarfil	Kawasaki	NJA		11	Ret	13							8
34	(Brazil) Flávio Trevizan	Kawasaki	MAS	DSQ	15		DSQ	11	NC	Ret		DSQ		6
35	(Brazil) Jhonatan Valentim	Kawasaki	NJA								12			4
36	(Brazil) Caio Lopes	Kawasaki	NJA					14					13	4
37	(Brazil) Eduardo Lopes	Kawasaki	MAS	13		Ret		17						3
38	(Brazil) Deividi Borges	Kawasaki	MAS					13						3
39	(Brazil) Leonardo Panades	Kawasaki	MAS						14					2
40	(Brazil) Tiago Crespo	Kawasaki	MAS									15		1
41	(Brazil) Ayres Filho	Kawasaki	NJA										16	0
42	(Brazil) Cauã Buzzo	Yamaha	R3	16										0
43	(Brazil) Samir Mattana	Kawasaki	MAS					16						0
44	(Brazil) Rafa Sanches	Kawasaki	MAS				18						DSQ	0
45	(Argentina) Andrés Gandola	Kawasaki	NJA						21					0
46	(Brazil) André Rizzato	Yamaha	R3				21							0
47	(Brazil) Ian Góes	Yamaha	R3					21	DNS					0
48	(Brazil) Rafael Palmieri "Risada"	Kawasaki	MAS								Ret			0
49	(Brazil) Léo Soprano	Yamaha	R3		Ret									0
50	(Brazil) Marco Barros	Kawasaki	NJA		Ret									0
51	(Brazil) Gabriel Noronha	Kawasaki	NJA			Ret								0
52	(Brazil) Leandro Pardini	Yamaha	R3				Ret							0
53	(Brazil) Cristiano Augusto	Kawasaki	MAS								Ret			0
54	(Brazil) Edinaldo "Tinta"	Kawasaki	NJA								DSQ			0
55	(Brazil) Jonathan Veronezi	Kawasaki	MAS								DSQ			0
56	(Brazil) Vítor Von	Kawasaki	NJA								DSQ			0
57	(Brazil) Luka Veríssimo	Kawasaki	MAS										DSQ	0
Pos	Piloto	Moto	Clase	(São Paulo (state)) SPO	(São Paulo (state)) PET	(São Paulo (state)) ELF	(São Paulo (state)) SUH	(São Paulo (state)) HON	(São Paulo (state)) BAN	(Minas Gerais) MGS	(Paraná (state)) LON	(Goiás) GOI	(São Paulo (state)) INT	Pts

Colour	Result
Gold	Winner
Silver	Second place
Bronze	Third place
Green	Points classification
Blue	Non-points classification
Blue	Non-classified finish (NC)
Purple	Retired, not classified (Ret)
Red	Did not qualify (DNQ)
Red	Did not pre-qualify (DNPQ)
Black	Disqualified (DSQ)
White	Did not start (DNS)
White	Withdrew (WD)
White	Race cancelled (C)
Blank	Did not practice (DNP)
Blank	Did not arrive (DNA)
Blank	Excluded (EX)

=== Constructors' standings ===
Pos	Constructor	(São Paulo (state)) SPO	(São Paulo (state)) PET	(São Paulo (state)) ELF	(São Paulo (state)) SUH	(São Paulo (state)) HON	(São Paulo (state)) BAN	(Minas Gerais) MGS	(Paraná (state)) LON	(Goiás) GOI	(São Paulo (state)) INT	Pts
1	(Japan) Kawasaki	1	1	1	1	1	1	1	1	1	1	250
2	(Japan) Yamaha	5	6	9	7	6	6	3	7	5	7	102
Pos	Constructor	(São Paulo (state)) SPO	(São Paulo (state)) PET	(São Paulo (state)) ELF	(São Paulo (state)) SUH	(São Paulo (state)) HON	(São Paulo (state)) BAN	(Minas Gerais) MGS	(Paraná (state)) LON	(Goiás) GOI	(São Paulo (state)) INT	Pts

=== Copa Honda CBR 650R ===
Icon	Class
PRO	PRO
MAS	Master
LGT	Light

Pos.	River	Moto	Class	(São Paulo (state)) SPO	(São Paulo (state)) PET	(São Paulo (state)) ELF	(São Paulo (state)) SUH	(São Paulo (state)) HON	(São Paulo (state)) BAN	(Minas Gerais) MGS	(Paraná (state)) LON	(Goiás) GOI	(São Paulo (state)) INT	Pts
1	(Brazil) João Carneiro	Honda	PRO	1	1	1	1	1	1	1	1	1	1	250
2	(Brazil) Marcelo Simões "Bode"	Honda	PRO	3	4	4	4	4	4	4	8	4	4	128
3	(Brazil) Gustavo da Silveira "Gão"	Honda	PRO	10	2	2	Ret	2	3	3	3	14	6	126
4	(Brazil) Maurício Laranjeira	Honda	PRO	4	6	5	7	7	6	8		7	8	87
5	(Brazil) Alexandre Colorado	Honda	MAS	Ret	5	3	3	Ret	17	2		3	7	88
6	(Brazil) Ayres Filho	Honda	LGT	6	7	6	9	5	5	Ret	Ret	8	Ret	66
7	(Brazil) Alex Fernandes	Honda	LGT	9	10	9	11	14	9	11	6	9	12	60
8	(Brazil) Lucas Minato	Honda	PRO	2	3	Ret	2	Ret					14	58
9	(Brazil) Juninho Moreira	Honda	LGT				5	3	2			6	17	57
10	(Brazil) Michael Valtingojer	Honda	MAS	5	11	13	10	10	7				10	46
11	(Brazil) Michael "Tanga"	Honda	MAS	7	8	8	6	12	DNS				13	42
12	(Brazil) Anderson Felipe	Honda	LGT	8	9	7	Ret	13	11	12		12		40
13	(Brazil) Pedro Kamikaze	Honda	PRO								4	5	5	35
14	(Brazil) Chrystian Quick	Honda	MAS					16	10	6	7		9	32
15	(Brazil) Fábio Bandeira	Honda	LGT							7	2		DNS	29
16	(Brazil) Edgar Grampola	Honda	LGT		13	11	13	15	12	10		11		27
17	(Brazil) Rodrigo Simon	Honda	LGT					9	8	5				26
18	(Brazil) Guilherme M. de Assis	Honda	LGT							9	5	10	Ret	26
19	(Brazil) Leandro Lima	Honda	MAS			12	8	6	Ret					22
20	(Brazil) Raquel Vaz	Honda	PRO									2		20
21	(Brazil) Rafael Oliveira	Honda	PRO										2	20
22	(Brazil) Richard Oliveira	Honda	PRO										3	16
23	(Brazil) Nélson Gonçalves "Mágico"	Honda	MAS				Ret			13	9			10
24	(Brazil) Marcos Kawasaki	Honda	LGT			10	12							10
25	(Brazil) Fábio Saeki	Honda	LGT					11					11	10
26	(Brazil) Fernando Orsi	Honda	LGT					8						8
27	(Brazil) Luiz Betinho Ferreira	Honda	PRO		12	Ret		17	13					7
28	(Brazil) Nelmer Zaffalon	Honda	MAS					20	16	14		13	16	5
29	(Brazil) Fabrício Ávila	Honda	LGT			14	14	19	Ret					4
30	(Brazil) Fernando Mezzalira	Honda	LGT						14					2
31	(Brazil) Marco Barros	Honda	MAS			15	15	18	Ret			Ret	19	2
32	(Brazil) Doca Schievano	Honda	LGT				16		15				15	2
33	(Brazil) Henrique Almeida	Honda	LGT										18	0
34	(United States) Ryan Burke	Honda	MAS		Ret									0
35	(Brazil) Leandro Siebert	Honda	LGT				Ret							0
36	(Brazil) Darla Farnesi	Honda	LGT							Ret				0
37	(Brazil) Leandro Leidens	Honda	LGT					DNS						0
Pos	Piloto	Moto	Clase	(São Paulo (state)) SPO	(São Paulo (state)) PET	(São Paulo (state)) ELF	(São Paulo (state)) SUH	(São Paulo (state)) HON	(São Paulo (state)) BAN	(Minas Gerais) MGS	(Paraná (state)) LON	(Goiás) GOI	(São Paulo (state)) INT	Pts

Colour	Result
Gold	Winner
Silver	Second place
Bronze	Third place
Green	Points classification
Blue	Non-points classification
Blue	Non-classified finish (NC)
Purple	Retired, not classified (Ret)
Red	Did not qualify (DNQ)
Red	Did not pre-qualify (DNPQ)
Black	Disqualified (DSQ)
White	Did not start (DNS)
White	Withdrew (WD)
White	Race cancelled (C)
Blank	Did not practice (DNP)
Blank	Did not arrive (DNA)
Blank	Excluded (EX)

=== Superbike Escola ===
Icon	Class
ESC	Escola
EST	Estreante

Pos.	River	Moto	Class	(São Paulo (state)) SPO	(São Paulo (state)) PET	(São Paulo (state)) ELF	(São Paulo (state)) SUH	(São Paulo (state)) HON	(São Paulo (state)) BAN	(Minas Gerais) MGS	(Paraná (state)) LON	(Goiás) GOI	(São Paulo (state)) INT	Pts
1	(Brazil) Vanderlei Pinho	BMW	ESC	1	2	1	2	3	DSQ	1	1	1	Ret	181
2	(Brazil) Anderson Costa	Honda	EST		8	8	7	5	4	3	3	2	1	126
3	(Uruguay) Adolfo Maciel "Uruguaio"	BMW	EST		6	Ret	4	1	2	2	2	5	10	125
4	(Brazil) Felipe Pan	Kawasaki	ESC	2	4	5	3	2	3	4	4	Ret		122
5	(Brazil) Alex Barbosa	BMW	ESC	4	3	4	1	7	1	Ret			Ret	101
6	(Brazil) Alex Melo	Kawasaki	EST	9	9	7	5	13	6	5	6	3	12	88
7	(Brazil) Adílson Maurício "Sele12"	Kawasaki	ESC	6	7	6	6	9	5	Ret	7	4	7	88
8	(Brazil) Adelino Navarro	Kawasaki	EST	7	10	10	10	14	9	7	8	7	6	72
9	(Brazil) Márcio Pacheco	BMW	ESC	3	1	Ret		4	Ret				3	70
10	(Brazil) Rafael Barros	BMW	EST	5	5	2		6	DSQ	Ret		NC	13	55
11	(Brazil) Luiz Veiga	Kawasaki	EST	8	DSQ	11	8	16	Ret	6	5	DNS		42
12	(Brazil) Christiano Frandoloso	Ducati	EST				Ret	Ret	10	8	DNS	6	5	35
13	(Brazil) David Pianez	Kawasaki	EST					11	8				2	33
14	(Brazil) Diego "Seco"	BMW	EST			9		10	7					22
15	(Brazil) Bruno Garcia	BMW	EST			3								16
16	(Brazil) Reginaldo Coutinho	Suzuki	EST										4	13
17	(Brazil) Diego Silva	Kawasaki	EST					17	Ret				8	8
18	(Brazil) Daniel Barbosa	BMW	EST									8		8
19	(Brazil) Márcio Candeia	Kawasaki	ESC					8						8
20	(Brazil) Nelmer Zaffalon	BMW	EST				9							7
21	(Brazil) Rodrigo Cereza Menocci	Ducati	EST										9	7
22	(Brazil) Daniel Deleu	Kawasaki	EST										11	5
23	(Brazil) Vinícius Moser Ochôa	Suzuki	EST					12						4
24	(Brazil) Marcelo Oliveira	BMW	EST					15						1
25	(Brazil) Mateus Bordin	BMW	EST	Ret										0
26	(Brazil) Marco Barros	Suzuki	EST	Ret										0
27	(Brazil) Diego Bue	BMW	EST						Ret					0
28	(Brazil) Fabrício Klug	BMW	EST						Ret					0
29	(Brazil) Thiago Fischer	Ducati	EST										Ret	0
30	(Brazil) Renato Santos	Honda	EST										Ret	0
31	(Brazil) Marcus Vinícius	BMW	ESC										Ret	0
32	(Brazil) Thiago Fragoso	BMW	EST										Wth	0
33	(Brazil) Leandro Leidens	Kawasaki	ESC										DNQ	0
Pos	Piloto	Moto	Clase	(São Paulo (state)) SPO	(São Paulo (state)) PET	(São Paulo (state)) ELF	(São Paulo (state)) SUH	(São Paulo (state)) HON	(São Paulo (state)) BAN	(Minas Gerais) MGS	(Paraná (state)) LON	(Goiás) GOI	(São Paulo (state)) INT	Pts

Colour	Result
Gold	Winner
Silver	Second place
Bronze	Third place
Green	Points classification
Blue	Non-points classification
Blue	Non-classified finish (NC)
Purple	Retired, not classified (Ret)
Red	Did not qualify (DNQ)
Red	Did not pre-qualify (DNPQ)
Black	Disqualified (DSQ)
White	Did not start (DNS)
White	Withdrew (WD)
White	Race cancelled (C)
Blank	Did not practice (DNP)
Blank	Did not arrive (DNA)
Blank	Excluded (EX)

=== Constructors' standings ===
Pos	Constructor	(São Paulo (state)) SPO	(São Paulo (state)) PET	(São Paulo (state)) ELF	(São Paulo (state)) SUH	(São Paulo (state)) HON	(São Paulo (state)) BAN	(Minas Gerais) MGS	(Paraná (state)) LON	(Goiás) GOI	(São Paulo (state)) INT	Pts
1	(Germany) BMW	1	1	1	1	1	1	1	1	1	3	241
2	(Japan) Kawasaki	2	4	5	3	2	3	4	4	4	2	168
3	(Japan) Honda		8	8	7	5	4	3	3	2	1	126
4	(Italy) Ducati				Ret	Ret	10	8	DNS	6	5	35
5	(Japan) Suzuki	Ret				12					4	17
Pos	Constructor	(São Paulo (state)) SPO	(São Paulo (state)) PET	(São Paulo (state)) ELF	(São Paulo (state)) SUH	(São Paulo (state)) HON	(São Paulo (state)) BAN	(Minas Gerais) MGS	(Paraná (state)) LON	(Goiás) GOI	(São Paulo (state)) INT	Pts

=== Supersport 400 Escola ===
Icon	Class
NJA	Ninja 400 Cup
R3	R3 Cup
500	CBR 500R
GCP	Girls Cup

Pos.	River	Moto	Class	(São Paulo (state)) SPO	(São Paulo (state)) PET	(São Paulo (state)) ELF	(São Paulo (state)) SUH	(São Paulo (state)) HON	(São Paulo (state)) BAN	(Minas Gerais) MGS	(Paraná (state)) LON	(Goiás) GOI	(São Paulo (state)) INT	Pts
1	(Brazil) Charles França	Kawasaki	NJA		8	3	5	4	1	2	3		2	129
2	(Brazil) Paulinho PJ	Kawasaki	NJA		3			2		1	1	2	3	122
3	(Brazil) Iolando Maciel	Yamaha	R3	1	1	9	4					1	1	120
4	(Brazil) Jemerson Medeiros	Kawasaki	NJA	5	4	2	2	Ret	DNS					64
5	(Brazil) Caio Lopes	Kawasaki	NJA	3	2	DSQ	1	Ret						61
6	(Brazil) Arílton "Piloto do Zero"	Kawasaki	NJA	Ret				6	2	4	4			56
7	(Brazil) Felipe Ardel	Kawasaki	NJA	12	Ret	1	3							45
8	(Brazil) Andressa Rosa	Kawasaki	GCP	6					5	8	11		10	40
9	(Brazil) Thati Iagui	Kawasaki	GCP	2		6	9							37
10	(Brazil) Devid Minho	Kawasaki	NJA		6	DNQ		1						35
11	(Brazil) Eduardo Maia	Yamaha	R3	7	7		8						7	35
12	(Brazil) Jordan Ribeiro	Honda	500	4	5		6							34
13	(Brazil) Ramón Torres	Yamaha	R3							7	6	4	Ret	32
14	(Brazil) Cris Fernandes	Kawasaki	GCP						6	10	12	5	Ret	31
15	(Brazil) Éverton dos Santos	Yamaha	R3	8			10	3	Ret					30
16	(Brazil) Fernando Moreno	Yamaha	R3		Ret	8	7				Ret		4	30
17	(Brazil) Bruno Pereira	Yamaha	R3	9		7		5						27
18	(Brazil) Jonathas Galvão	Kawasaki	NJA			DNQ						3	11	21
19	(Brazil) Carlos "Japa"	Kawasaki	NJA		Ret	DNQ					2			20
20	(Brazil) Melissa Eschiavi	Kawasaki	GCP						4	Ret	9			20
21	(Brazil) Jonathas Bruno	Kawasaki	NJA							5	7			20
22	(Brazil) Andrigo Morandi	Kawasaki	Ninja 250		Ret	4	11							18
23	(Brazil) Fernando Abbott	Kawasaki	Ninja 300			5		9						18
24	(Brazil) Evandro Lima	Kawasaki	NJA						3			Ret		16
25	(Brazil) Thiago Correia	Kawasaki	NJA							3				16
26	(Brazil) Thiago Crespo	Yamaha	R3		10					6				16
27	(Brazil) Ricardo "Preguinho"	Kawasaki	NJA					11					6	15
28	(Brazil) Patrícia Godoy Barbosa	Kawasaki	GCP	10					7				16	15
29	(Brazil) Dênisson Malhano	Kawasaki	Ninja 300	11		Ret		8						13
30	(Brazil) Flávio Kai	Kawasaki	NJA								5			11
31	(Brazil) Erklin Leite	Kawasaki	NJA										5	11
32	(Brazil) Eduardo Correia	Kawasaki	NJA					7						9
33	(Brazil) Alessandra Ribeiro	Honda	GCP		9	Ret	Ret							7
34	(Brazil) Imar Mourão	Yamaha	R3	Ret		Ret				9				7
35	(Brazil) Alexandre Negrão	Yamaha	R3								8			8
36	(Brazil) Rodrigo Ranieri	Kawasaki	NJA										8	8
37	(Brazil) Kaio Felipe de Oliveira	Kawasaki	NJA										9	7
38	(Brazil) Cristian Pierre	Kawasaki	Ninja 300					10			DNQ			6
39	(Brazil) Fernando Dias	Kawasaki	NJA								10			6
40	(Brazil) Juliana Reis	Kawasaki	GCP			DNQ							12	4
41	(Brazil) Emanuel Formagio	Yamaha	R3			DNQ							13	3
42	(Brazil) Gustavo Duarte	Yamaha	R3										14	2
43	(Brazil) Alice Matos	Yamaha	GCP										15	1
44	(Brazil) Léo Henry	Kawasaki	NJA										17	0
45	(Brazil) Valter Pinho	Kawasaki	NJA			Ret							Ret	0
46	(Brazil) Willian Silva	Yamaha	R3										Ret	0
Pos	Piloto	Moto	Clase	(São Paulo (state)) SPO	(São Paulo (state)) PET	(São Paulo (state)) ELF	(São Paulo (state)) SUH	(São Paulo (state)) HON	(São Paulo (state)) BAN	(Minas Gerais) MGS	(Paraná (state)) LON	(Goiás) GOI	(São Paulo (state)) INT	Pts

Colour	Result
Gold	Winner
Silver	Second place
Bronze	Third place
Green	Points classification
Blue	Non-points classification
Blue	Non-classified finish (NC)
Purple	Retired, not classified (Ret)
Red	Did not qualify (DNQ)
Red	Did not pre-qualify (DNPQ)
Black	Disqualified (DSQ)
White	Did not start (DNS)
White	Withdrew (WD)
White	Race cancelled (C)
Blank	Did not practice (DNP)
Blank	Did not arrive (DNA)
Blank	Excluded (EX)

=== Constructors' standings ===
Pos	Constructor	(São Paulo (state)) SPO	(São Paulo (state)) PET	(São Paulo (state)) ELF	(São Paulo (state)) SUH	(São Paulo (state)) HON	(São Paulo (state)) BAN	(Minas Gerais) MGS	(Paraná (state)) LON	(Goiás) GOI	(São Paulo (state)) INT	Pts
1	(Japan) Kawasaki	2	2	1	1	1	1	1	1	2	2	230
2	(Japan) Yamaha	1	1	7	4	3	Ret	6	6	1	1	125
3	(Japan) Honda	4	5	Ret	6							34
Pos	Constructor	(São Paulo (state)) SPO	(São Paulo (state)) PET	(São Paulo (state)) ELF	(São Paulo (state)) SUH	(São Paulo (state)) HON	(São Paulo (state)) BAN	(Minas Gerais) MGS	(Paraná (state)) LON	(Goiás) GOI	(São Paulo (state)) INT	Pts

=== Honda Junior Cup ===
Icon	Class
CUP	Honda Junior Cup

Pos.	River	Moto	Class	(São Paulo (state)) SPO	(São Paulo (state)) PET	(São Paulo (state)) ELF	(São Paulo (state)) SUH	(São Paulo (state)) HON	(São Paulo (state)) BAN	(Minas Gerais) MGS	(Paraná (state)) LON	(Goiás) GOI	(São Paulo (state)) INT	Pts
1	(Brazil) Leonardo Marques Barbim	Honda	CUP	4	2	1	1	1	3	1	1	1	3	220
2	(Brazil) Enzo Ximenes	Honda	CUP	5	1	3	3	2	4	2	2	4	1	182
3	(Brazil) Vítor Hugo	Honda	CUP	6	5	2	2	3	1	3	3	2	5	165
4	(Brazil) Heitor Luz Santos "Ourinho"	Honda	CUP	3	7	5	4	4	2	4	4	3	4	137
5	(Brazil) Miguel Garcia	Honda	CUP	1	3	8	7	7	6	5	5	Ret	2	120
6	(Brazil) Érick Adib	Honda	CUP	12	10	7	9	9	7	8	7	6	6	79
7	(Brazil) Marcos Vinícius	Honda	CUP	10	4	4	5	6	5	6				74
8	(Brazil) Felipe Simões	Honda	CUP	Ret	12		6	5		9	6	5	9	60
9	(Brazil) Alice Matos	Honda	CUP	11	11	10	8	12	Ret	Ret	10	8	10	48
10	(Brazil) Miguel Simon	Honda	CUP	7	9	9		8	Ret	10			7	46
11	(Brazil) Lucas Mendes	Honda	CUP	DNS	13	11	11	10	8	Ret		11	12	36
12	(Brazil) Guilherme Baron	Honda	CUP						Ret	11	8	7	8	30
13	(Brazil) Cauã Nunes Rocha	Honda	CUP	9	8	Ret	Ret			7			Ret	24
14	(Argentina) Gustavo Martínez	Honda	CUP	8	6	12	DNS							22
15	(Brazil) Murilo Gomes Silva	Honda	CUP	2	Ret									21
16	(Brazil) Gabriel Marchi	Honda	CUP	15		6	10							17
17	(Brazil) Pedro Rizadinha	Honda	CUP								11	9	11	17
18	(Brazil) Renan Lourenço	Honda	CUP				12							11
19	(Brazil) Lorenzo Messerchmitt	Honda	CUP				13	Ret			12		13	10
20	(Brazil) Enzo Amorim	Honda	CUP						9					7
21	(Brazil) Vinícius Rueda Garcia	Honda	CUP								9			7
22	(Brazil) Anna Vaz	Honda	CUP									10		6
23	(Brazil) Iván Silva Álvares	Honda	CUP	13				13						6
24	(Brazil) Gigi Quadros	Honda	CUP					11						5
25	(Brazil) Gilmar Alves	Honda	CUP								13			3
26	(Brazil) Kelly Krug Pinheiro	Honda	CUP	14				16						2
27	(Brazil) João Pedro França	Honda	CUP					14						2
28	(Brazil) Valentina Pereira	Honda	CUP					15						1
29	(Brazil) Gustavo Silva	Honda	CUP	16										0
30	(Brazil) Nanda Abbott	Honda	CUP					17						0
31	(Brazil) Daniel Kraus	Honda	CUP	17										0
Pos	Piloto	Moto	Clase	(São Paulo (state)) SPO	(São Paulo (state)) PET	(São Paulo (state)) ELF	(São Paulo (state)) SUH	(São Paulo (state)) HON	(São Paulo (state)) BAN	(Minas Gerais) MGS	(Paraná (state)) LON	(Goiás) GOI	(São Paulo (state)) INT	Pts

Colour	Result
Gold	Winner
Silver	Second place
Bronze	Third place
Green	Points classification
Blue	Non-points classification
Blue	Non-classified finish (NC)
Purple	Retired, not classified (Ret)
Red	Did not qualify (DNQ)
Red	Did not pre-qualify (DNPQ)
Black	Disqualified (DSQ)
White	Did not start (DNS)
White	Withdrew (WD)
White	Race cancelled (C)
Blank	Did not practice (DNP)
Blank	Did not arrive (DNA)
Blank	Excluded (EX)

=== Scoring system ===
Points are awarded to the top fifteen finishers of the main race and to the top nine of the sprint. A rider has to finish the race to earn points.

Position	1°	2°	3°	4°	5°	6°	7°	8°	9°	10°	11°	12°	13°	14°	15°
Race	25	20	16	13	11	10	9	8	7	6	5	4	3	2	1

== Champions of all categories ==
=== Overview ===
#	Class	Champion	Team	Construtor	Moto	Ref
PRO	Superbike	(Brazil) Pedro Sampaio	(Brazil) Luvizotto Race Team	(Japan) Honda	Honda CBR1000RR	
EVO	Superbike Evolution	(Brazil) Manow Martins	(Brazil) Koube Motonil Motors	(Japan) Kawasaki	Kawasaki Ninja ZX-10R	
LGT	Superbike Light	(Brazil) Luís Bertoli	(Brazil) Controllity Racing	(Japan) Kawasaki	Kawasaki Ninja ZX-10R	
MAS	Superbike Master	(Brazil) Juracy Rodrigues "Black"	(Brazil) Tecfil Racing Team	(Japan) Kawasaki	Kawasaki Ninja ZX-10R	
SEN	Superbike Master Senior	(Brazil) Édson Errera	(Brazil) Errera Racing	(Japan) Honda	Honda CBR1000RR	
PRO	Supersport 600 Pro	(Brazil) Felipe Gonçalves	(Brazil) HJC / PSBK Racing	(Japan) Kawasaki	Kawasaki Ninja ZX-6R	
EVO	Supersport 600 Evolution	(Brazil) Ronaldo "Tutti" Ranieri	(France) DS Performance	(Japan) Kawasaki	Kawasaki Ninja ZX-6R	
PEV	Supersport 600 PRO Evolution	(Argentina) Franco Pandolfino	(Brazil) Luvizotto Race Team	(Japan) Kawasaki	Kawasaki Ninja ZX-6R	
EST	Supersport 600 Estreante	(Brazil) Júnio Bereta	(Brazil) AST Racing	(United Kingdom) Triumph	Triumph Daytona 675R	
NJA	Supersport 400 - Ninja 400 Cup	(Brazil) João Arratia	(Brazil) HJC/ PSBK Racing	(Japan) Kawasaki	Kawasaki Ninja Z400	
MAS	Supersport 400 - Master	(Brazil) Fabinho da Hornet	(Brazil) W2V MotorSport	(Japan) Kawasaki	Kawasaki Ninja Z400	
R3	Supersport 400 - R3 Cup	(Brazil) João Fascinelli	(Brazil) Fascinelli Racing	(Japan) Yamaha	Yamaha YZF-R3	
PRO	Copa Honda CBR 650R Pro	(Brazil) João Carneiro	(Brazil) Cajuru Racing	(Japan) Honda	Honda CBR 650R	
LGT	Copa Honda CBR 650R Light	(Brazil) Ayres Filho	(Brazil) AllBoy Colorado	(Japan) Honda	Honda CBR 650R	
MAS	Copa Honda CBR 650R Master	(Brazil) Alexandre Colorado	(Brazil) AllBoy Colorado	(Japan) Honda	Honda CBR 650R	
ESC	Superbike Escola	(Brazil) Vanderlei Pinho	(Brazil) Tecfil Racing Team	(Germany) BMW	BMW S1000RR	
EST	Superbike Estreante	(Brazil) Anderson Costa	(Brazil) Tamujunto Racing Team	(Japan) Honda	Honda CBR 1000RR	
NJA	Supersport 400 Escola - Ninja 400 Cup	(Brazil) Charles França	(Brazil) Kings SE Racing Team	(Japan) Kawasaki	Kawasaki Ninja 400	
500	Supersport 400 Escola - 500cc	(Brazil) Jordan Ribeiro	(Brazil) MP Racing	(Japan) Honda	Honda CBR500R	
R3	Supersport 400 Escola - R3	(Brazil) Iolando Maciel	(Brazil) Dezeró Racing	(Japan) Yamaha	Yamaha YZF R3	
GCP	Girls Cup	(Brazil) Andressa Rosa	(Brazil) Heart of Racing by SPS	(Japan) Kawasaki	Kawasaki Ninja 400	
	Supersport 400 Escola - Ninja 300 Cup	(Brazil) Fernando Abbott	(Brazil) Collection Motorsport	(Japan) Kawasaki	Kawasaki Ninja 400	
	Supersport 400 Escola - Ninja 250 Cup	(Brazil) Andrigo Morandi	(Brazil) WTM by Rinaldi Racing	(Japan) Kawasaki	Kawasaki Ninja 400	
CUP	Honda Junior Cup	(Brazil) Leonardo Marques Barbim	(Brazil) Spirit Racing	(Japan) Honda	Honda CG 160 Titan	

== See also ==
- SuperBike Brasil
- Moto 1000 GP
- Superbike World Championship
- Outline of motorcycles and motorcycling
- British Superbike Championship
- MotoAmerica
- AMA Superbike Championship
- All Japan Road Race Championship
- Australian Superbike Championship
- Grand Prix motorcycle racing
