= SuperBike Brasil =

Motorcycle racing category in Brazil

Superbike Brasil
- Category: Motorcycle sport
- Country: Brazil
- Inaugural season: 2010
- Riders: 22
- Teams: 11
- Constructors: 6 (Germany) BMW, (Italy) Ducati, (Japan) Honda, (Japan) Kawasaki, (Japan) Suzuki, (Japan) Yamaha
- Tyre suppliers: P Pirelli
- Riders' champion: 2025 – (São Paulo (state)) Eric Granado
- Official website: superbike.com.br

The Brazilian Superbike Championship was the main motorcycle category in Brazil in 2010 and since 2016. In between Moto 1000 GP gained in popularity from 2011 to 2015 with backing from former MotoGP rider Alex Barros.

The Brazilian Superbike Championship is the leading road racing superbike championship in Brazil, and is acknowledged to be the premier domestic superbike racing series in South America.

The Brazilian Superbike Championship, known as SuperBike Brasil, was created with the goal of professionalizing and strengthening motorcycle road racing competitions in the country. Founded in the early 2010s, the championship quickly established itself as the main national motorcycle racing series, bringing together experienced riders, young talents, and well-structured teams.

Inspired by major international championships, SuperBike Brasil introduced a new standard of organization, safety, and visibility to the sport, with well-defined technical regulations and multiple categories, such as SuperBike Pro, SuperSport, and SuperStock, allowing riders of different skill levels to compete.

Over the years, the championship has visited important Brazilian racetracks, including Interlagos, Goiânia, and Curitiba, and has helped reveal riders who went on to stand out both nationally and internationally. In addition, it has significantly contributed to the development of the motorcycle industry, attracting manufacturers, sponsors, and public interest.

Today, SuperBike Brasil is recognized as a benchmark in Brazilian motorsport, playing a fundamental role in rider development and in popularizing motorcycle road racing in Brazil.

== Brazilian superbike champions ==
Season	Champion	Moto	Team	Info
2010	(São Paulo (state)) Murilo Colatreli	(Japan) Kawasaki ZX-10R	(Brazil) Dia-Frag Racing	
2011	(São Paulo (state)) Danilo Andric	(Germany) BMW S1000RR	(Brazil) Limited Motorsport	
2012	(Paraná (state)) Diego Faustino	(Germany) BMW S1000RR	(Brazil) BMW Team Brasil	
2013	(Rio Grande do Sul) Maico Teixeira	(Japan) Honda CBR1000RR	(Brazil) Honda Mobil Racing	
2014	(Rio Grande do Sul) Maico Teixeira	(Japan) Honda CBR1000RR	(Brazil) Honda Mobil Racing	
2015	(Paraná (state)) Diego Faustino	(Japan) Honda CBR1000RR	(Brazil) Honda Mobil Racing	
2016	(Paraná (state)) Diego Faustino	(Japan) Honda CBR1000RR	(Brazil) Honda Racing Corporation	
2017	(São Paulo (state)) Eric Granado	(Japan) Honda CBR1000RR	(Brazil) Honda Racing Corporation	
2018	(São Paulo (state)) Eric Granado	(Japan) Honda CBR1000RR	(Brazil) Honda Racing Corporation	
2019	(São Paulo (state)) Eric Granado	(Japan) Honda CBR1000RR	(Brazil) Honda Racing Corporation	
2020	(São Paulo (state)) Eric Granado	(Japan) Honda CBR1000RR	(Brazil) Honda Racing Corporation	
2021	(Rio Grande do Sul) Pedro Sampaio	(Japan) Honda CBR1000RR	(Brazil) RXP / TRH Racing	
2022	(Rio Grande do Sul) Pedro Sampaio	(Japan) Honda CBR1000RR	(Brazil) Luvizotto Race Team	
2023	(Uruguay) Maxi Gerardo	(Germany) BMW S1000RR	(Brazil) BMW Rider Experience	
2024	(São Paulo (state)) Eric Granado	(Japan) Honda CBR1000RR	(Brazil) Honda Racing Brasil	
2025	(São Paulo (state)) Eric Granado	(Japan) Honda CBR1000RR	(Brazil) Honda Racing Brasil	
