= 2019 Brazilian Superbike Championship =

Motorcycle racing competition

The 2019 Brazilian Superbike Championship was the 11th edition of the Brazilian Superbike Championship.

== Calendar ==
Round	Date	Circuit	City
1	March 24	Autódromo Internacional de Interlagos	São Paulo, SP
2	April 14	Autódromo Internacional de Interlagos	São Paulo, SP
3	May 26	Autódromo Internacional de Interlagos	São Paulo, SP
4	July 14	Autódromo Ayrton Senna	Goiânia, GO
5	September 01	Autódromo Internacional de Curitiba	Curitiba, PR
6	September 22	Autódromo Ayrton Senna	Goiânia, GO
7	October 20	Autódromo Ayrton Senna	Goiânia, GO
8	November 10	Autódromo Internacional de Curitiba	Curitiba, PR
9	November 26	Autódromo Internacional de Interlagos	São Paulo, SP

== Results ==
=== Superbike ===
Round	Circuit	Date	Pole position	Fastest lap	Winning rider	Winning team	Winning constructor	Ref.
1	(São Paulo (state)) Autódromo Internacional de Interlagos	March 24	(Brazil) Eric Granado	(Brazil) Pedro Sampaio	(Australia) Anthony West	(Brazil) JC Racing Team	(Japan) Kawasaki	
2	(São Paulo (state)) Autódromo Internacional de Interlagos	April 14	(Brazil) Eric Granado	(Brazil) Eric Granado	(Brazil) Eric Granado	(Brazil) Honda Racing	(Japan) Honda	
3	(São Paulo (state)) Autódromo Internacional de Interlagos	May 26	(Brazil) Eric Granado	(Brazil) Eric Granado	(Brazil) Eric Granado	(Brazil) Honda Racing	(Japan) Honda	
4	(Goiás) Autódromo Ayrton Senna	July 14	(Brazil) Eric Granado	(Brazil) Eric Granado	(Brazil) Eric Granado	(Brazil) Honda Racing	(Japan) Honda	
5	(Paraná (state)) Autódromo Internacional de Curitiba	September 01	(Brazil) Pedro Sampaio	(Brazil) Danilo Lewis	(Brazil) Danilo Lewis	(Brazil) Tecfil Havoline Racing Team	(Germany) BMW	
6	(Goiás) Autódromo Ayrton Senna	September 22	(Brazil) Eric Granado	(Brazil) Eric Granado	(Brazil) Eric Granado	(Brazil) Honda Racing	(Japan) Honda	
7	(Goiás) Autódromo Ayrton Senna	October 20	(Brazil) Eric Granado	(Brazil) Eric Granado	(Brazil) Eric Granado	(Brazil) Honda Racing	(Japan) Honda	
8	(Paraná (state)) Autódromo Internacional de Curitiba	November 10	(Brazil) Eric Granado	(Brazil) Danilo Lewis	(Brazil) Eric Granado	(Brazil) Honda Racing	(Japan) Honda	
9	(São Paulo (state)) Autódromo Internacional de Interlagos	December 01	(Brazil) Eric Granado	(Brazil) Eric Granado	(Brazil) Eric Granado	(Brazil) Honda Racing	(Japan) Honda	

=== Superbike Light ===
Ronda	Circuito	Fecha	Pole Position	Vuelta rápida	Piloto ganador	Equipo ganador	Constructor	Ref.
1	(São Paulo (state)) Grande Prêmio de São Paulo	22 de febrero	(Brazil) Marcelo Skaf	(Brazil) Bruno Corano	(Brazil) Bruno Corano	(Germany) BMW Motorrad MotorSport	(Germany) BMW	
2	(São Paulo (state)) Grande Prêmio Petrobras	12 de abril	(Brazil) Bruno Corano	(Brazil) Marcelo Skaf	(Brazil) Bruno Corano	(Germany) BMW Motorrad MotorSport	(Germany) BMW	
3	(São Paulo (state)) Grande Prêmio Elf	24 de mayo	(Brazil) Bruno Corano	(Brazil) Bruno Corano	(Brazil) Juracy Rodrigues "Black"	(Spain) Volcano Motorsport	(Germany) BMW	
4	(São Paulo (state)) Grande Prêmio Yamaha	12 de julio	(Brazil) Bruno Corano	(Brazil) Márcio Bortolini	(Brazil) Márcio Bortolini	(Brazil) Sulina Racing	(Germany) BMW	
5	(Paraná (state)) Grande Prêmio de Curitiba	30 de agosto	(Brazil) Felipe Comerlatto	(Brazil) Felipe Comerlatto	(Brazil) Felipe Comerlatto	(Brazil) Pro Racing Team	(Germany) BMW	
6	Grande Prêmio de Goiás	20 de septiembre	(Brazil) Márcio Bortolini	(Brazil) Osvaldo Jorge "Duende"	(Brazil) Márcio Bortolini	(Brazil) Sulina Racing	(Germany) BMW	
7	(Goiás) Grande Prêmio das Esmeraldas	17 de octubre	(Brazil) Victor Villaverde	(Brazil) Guilherme Neto	(Brazil) Márcio Bortolini	(Brazil) Sulina Racing	(Germany) BMW	
8	(Goiás) Grande Prêmio de Goiânia	18 de octubre	(Brazil) André Veríssimo	(Brazil) Márcio Bortolini	(Brazil) Guilherme Neto	(Brazil) Pro Racing Team	(Germany) BMW	
9	(Paraná (state)) Grande Prêmio do Paraná	8 de noviembre	(Brazil) André Veríssimo	(Brazil) Marcelo Skaf	(Brazil) Márcio Bortolini	(Brazil) Sulina Racing	(Germany) BMW	
10	(São Paulo (state)) Grande Prêmio Suhai	26 de noviembre	(Brazil) Guto Figueiredo	(Brazil) Felipe Comerlatto	(Brazil) Márcio Manow Martins	(Brazil) Trust Motor	(Japan) Kawasaki	
11	(São Paulo (state)) Grande Prêmio de Interlagos	27 de noviembre	(Brazil) André Veríssimo	(Brazil) Bruno Corano	(Brazil) Bruno Corano	(Germany) BMW Motorrad MotorSport	(Germany) BMW	

=== Superbike Escola 1000 ===
Ronda	Circuito	Fecha	Pole Position	Vuelta rápida	Piloto ganador	Equipo ganador	Constructor	Ref.
1	(São Paulo (state)) Grande Prêmio de São Paulo	22 de febrero	(Brazil) Rafael Palmieri	(Brazil) Eduardo Lopes	(Paraguay) Nicolas Agüero Castorino	(Brazil) Motom	(Japan) Honda	
2	(São Paulo (state)) Grande Prêmio Petrobras	12 de abril	(Brazil) Rafael Palmieri	(Brazil) Fábio "Queiroz"	(Brazil) Fábio "Queiroz"	(Brazil) Double F Racing	(Germany) BMW	
3	(São Paulo (state)) Grande Prêmio Elf	24 de mayo	(Brazil) Rafael Palmieri	(Brazil) Éverton Antônio Pires	(Brazil) Éverton Antônio Pires	(Brazil) Motonil Motors	(Germany) BMW	
4	(São Paulo (state)) Grande Prêmio Yamaha	12 de julio	(Brazil) Rafael Palmieri	(Brazil) Rafael Palmieri	(Brazil) Rafael Palmieri	(Brazil) PSBK Racing	(Germany) BMW	
5	(Paraná (state)) Grande Prêmio de Curitiba	30 de agosto	(Brazil) Luiz H. Bertoli	(Brazil) Rafael Palmieri	(Brazil) Rafael Palmieri	(Brazil) PSBK Racing	(Germany) BMW	
6	Grande Prêmio de Goiás	20 de septiembre	(Brazil) Rafael Palmieri	(Brazil) Bruno Eduardo "Bruninho"	(Brazil) Rafael Palmieri	(Brazil) PSBK Racing	(Germany) BMW	
7	(Goiás) Grande Prêmio das Esmeraldas	17 de octubre	(Brazil) Luiz H. Bertoli	(Brazil) Eduardo Lopes	(Brazil) Luiz H. Bertoli	(Brazil) PSBK Racing	(Japan) Kawasaki	
8	(Goiás) Grande Prêmio de Goiânia	18 de octubre	(Brazil) Eduardo Lopes	(Brazil) Eduardo Lopes	(Brazil) Eduardo Lopes	(Argentina) Team Patito	(Italy) Ducati	
9	(Paraná (state)) Grande Prêmio do Paraná	8 de noviembre	(Brazil) Luiz H. Bertoli	(Brazil) Luiz H. Bertoli	(Brazil) Rafael Palmieri	(Brazil) PSBK Racing	(Germany) BMW	
10	(São Paulo (state)) Grande Prêmio Suhai	26 de noviembre	(Brazil) Rafael Palmieri	(Brazil) Marco Pérez "Marcão"	(Brazil) Fábio "Queiroz"	(Brazil) Double F Racing	(Germany) BMW	
11	(São Paulo (state)) Grande Prêmio de Interlagos	27 de noviembre	(Brazil) Rafael Palmieri	(Brazil) Rafael Palmieri	(Brazil) Rafael Palmieri	(Brazil) PSBK Racing	(Germany) BMW	

=== Supersport 600 ===
Ronda	Circuito	Fecha	Pole Position	Vuelta rápida	Piloto ganador	Equipo ganador	Constructor	Ref.
1	(São Paulo (state)) Grande Prêmio de São Paulo	22 de febrero	(Brazil) Leonardo Tamburro	(Brazil) Leonardo Tamburro	(Brazil) Matheus Barbosa	(Japan) Kawasaki Racing Team	(Japan) Kawasaki	
2	(São Paulo (state)) Grande Prêmio Petrobras	12 de abril	(Brazil) Matheus Barbosa	(Brazil) Matheus Barbosa	(Brazil) Matheus Barbosa	(Japan) Kawasaki Racing Team	(Japan) Kawasaki	
3	(São Paulo (state)) Grande Prêmio Elf	24 de mayo	(Brazil) Matheus Barbosa	(Brazil) Matheus Barbosa	(Brazil) Matheus Barbosa	(Japan) Kawasaki Racing Team	(Japan) Kawasaki	
4	(São Paulo (state)) Grande Prêmio Yamaha	12 de julio	(Brazil) Leonardo Tamburro	(Brazil) Leonardo Tamburro	(Brazil) Leonardo Tamburro	(Japan) Kawasaki Racing Team	(Japan) Kawasaki	
5	(Paraná (state)) Grande Prêmio de Curitiba	30 de agosto	(Brazil) Leonardo Tamburro	(Brazil) Matheus Barbosa	(Brazil) Leonardo Tamburro	(Japan) Kawasaki Racing Team	(Japan) Kawasaki	
6	Grande Prêmio de Goiás	20 de septiembre	(Brazil) Matheus Barbosa	(Brazil) Matheus Barbosa	(Brazil) Matheus Barbosa	(Japan) Kawasaki Racing Team	(Japan) Kawasaki	
7	(Goiás) Grande Prêmio das Esmeraldas	17 de octubre	(Brazil) Matheus Barbosa	(Brazil) Matheus Barbosa	(Brazil) Matheus Barbosa	(Japan) Kawasaki Racing Team	(Japan) Kawasaki	
8	(Goiás) Grande Prêmio de Goiânia	18 de octubre	(Brazil) Matheus Barbosa	(Brazil) Matheus Barbosa	(Brazil) Matheus Barbosa	(Japan) Kawasaki Racing Team	(Japan) Kawasaki	
9	(Paraná (state)) Grande Prêmio do Paraná	8 de noviembre	(Brazil) Matheus Barbosa	(Argentina) Mauro Passarino	(Brazil) Matheus Barbosa	(Japan) Kawasaki Racing Team	(Japan) Kawasaki	
10	(São Paulo (state)) Grande Prêmio Suhai	26 de noviembre	(Brazil) Matheus Barbosa	(Brazil) Matheus Barbosa	(Brazil) Leonardo Tamburro	(Japan) Kawasaki Racing Team	(Japan) Kawasaki	
11	(São Paulo (state)) Grande Prêmio de Interlagos	27 de noviembre	(Brazil) Matheus Barbosa	(Brazil) Leonardo Tamburro	(Brazil) Leonardo Tamburro	(Japan) Kawasaki Racing Team	(Japan) Kawasaki	

=== Supersport Escola 600 ===
Ronda	Circuito	Fecha	Pole Position	Vuelta rápida	Piloto ganador	Equipo ganador	Constructor	Ref.
1	(São Paulo (state)) Grande Prêmio de São Paulo	22 de febrero	(Brazil) Alex Penholato	(Brazil) Alex Penholato	(Brazil) Alex Penholato	(Brazil) Spiga/MB Racing	(Japan) Kawasaki	
2	(São Paulo (state)) Grande Prêmio Petrobras	12 de abril	(Brazil) Alex Penholato	(Brazil) Fernando Martins	(Brazil) Alex Penholato	(Brazil) Spiga/MB Racing	(Japan) Kawasaki	
3	(São Paulo (state)) Grande Prêmio Elf	24 de mayo	(Brazil) Raphael Santos	(Brazil) Raphael Santos	(Brazil) Raphael Santos	(Brazil) Dezeró Racing	(England) Triumph	
4	(São Paulo (state)) Grande Prêmio Yamaha	12 de julio	(Brazil) Vítor Simões	(Brazil) Vítor Simões	(Brazil) Vítor Simões	(Brazil) SPN Racing - 598	(Japan) Yamaha	
5	(Paraná (state)) Grande Prêmio de Curitiba	30 de agosto	(Brazil) Marcelo Demasi	(Brazil) Vítor Simões	(Brazil) Danilo Nicolas "Nico"	(Argentina) Rene Zanatta Sport	(Italy) Ducati	
6	Grande Prêmio de Goiás	20 de septiembre	(Brazil) Raphael Motta	(Brazil) Raphael Motta	(Brazil) Raphael Motta	(Brazil) Dezeró Racing	(England) Triumph	
7	(Goiás) Grande Prêmio das Esmeraldas	17 de octubre	(Brazil) Gustavo Turner	(Brazil) Raphael Motta	(Brazil) Raphael Motta	(Brazil) Dezeró Racing	(England) Triumph	
8	(Goiás) Grande Prêmio de Goiânia	18 de octubre	(Brazil) Gustavo Turner	(Brazil) Vítor Simões	(Brazil) Vítor Simões	(Brazil) SPN Racing - 598	(Japan) Yamaha	
9	(Paraná (state)) Grande Prêmio do Paraná	8 de noviembre	(Brazil) Vítor Simões	(Brazil) Vítor Simões	(Brazil) Vítor Simões	(Brazil) SPN Racing - 598	(Japan) Yamaha	
10	(São Paulo (state)) Grande Prêmio Suhai	26 de noviembre	(Brazil) Vítor Simões	(Brazil) Rodrigo César "Batata"	(Brazil) Vítor Simões	(Brazil) SPN Racing - 598	(Japan) Yamaha	
11	(São Paulo (state)) Grande Prêmio de Interlagos	27 de noviembre	(Brazil) Raphael Motta	(Brazil) Raphael Motta	(Brazil) Raphael Motta	(Brazil) Dezeró Racing	(England) Triumph	

=== Copa Honda CBR 500R ===
Ronda	Circuito	Fecha	Pole Position	Vuelta rápida	Piloto ganador	Equipo ganador	Constructor	Ref.
1	(São Paulo (state)) Grande Prêmio de São Paulo	22 de febrero	(Brazil) Raphael K. Ramos	(Brazil) Marcelo Moreno "MM"	(Brazil) Fábio Florian	Qatar Racing Team	(Japan) Honda	
2	(São Paulo (state)) Grande Prêmio Petrobras	12 de abril	(Brazil) Raphael K. Ramos	(Brazil) Raphael K. Ramos	(Brazil) Raphael K. Ramos	(Brazil) MotoSchool Racing Team	(Japan) Honda	
3	(São Paulo (state)) Grande Prêmio Elf	24 de mayo	(Brazil) Raphael K. Ramos	(Brazil) Fábio Florian	(Brazil) Fábio Florian	Qatar Racing Team	(Japan) Honda	
4	(São Paulo (state)) Grande Prêmio Yamaha	12 de julio	(Brazil) Mário Nicoli	(Brazil) Mário Nicoli	(Brazil) Raphael K. Ramos	(Brazil) MotoSchool Racing Team	(Japan) Honda	
5	(Paraná (state)) Grande Prêmio de Curitiba	30 de agosto	(Brazil) Raphael K. Ramos	(Brazil) Fábio Florian	(Brazil) Luiz Henrique "Luizinho"	(Brazil) Tecfil Havoline Racing	(Japan) Honda	
6	Grande Prêmio de Goiás	20 de septiembre	(Brazil) Christian Cerciari	(Brazil) Fábio Florian	(Brazil) Christian Cerciari	(Brazil) Cerciari Racing School	(Japan) Honda	
7	(Goiás) Grande Prêmio das Esmeraldas	17 de octubre	(Brazil) Christian Cerciari	(Brazil) Fábio Florian	(Brazil) Christian Cerciari	(Brazil) Cerciari Racing School	(Japan) Honda	
8	(Goiás) Grande Prêmio de Goiânia	18 de octubre	(Brazil) Raphael K. Ramos	(Brazil) Fábio Florian	(Brazil) Raphael K. Ramos	(Brazil) MotoSchool Racing Team	(Japan) Honda	
9	(Paraná (state)) Grande Prêmio do Paraná	8 de noviembre	(Brazil) Raphael K. Ramos	(Brazil) Christian Cerciari	(Brazil) Raphael K. Ramos	(Brazil) MotoSchool Racing Team	(Japan) Honda	
10	(São Paulo (state)) Grande Prêmio Suhai	26 de noviembre	(Brazil) Christian Cerciari	(Brazil) Fábio Florian	(Brazil) Raphael K. Ramos	(Brazil) MotoSchool Racing Team	(Japan) Honda	
11	(São Paulo (state)) Grande Prêmio de Interlagos	27 de noviembre	(Brazil) Christian Cerciari	(Brazil) Fábio Florian	(Brazil) Raphael K. Ramos	(Brazil) MotoSchool Racing Team	(Japan) Honda	

=== Yamaha Yamalube R3 Cup ===
Ronda	Circuito	Fecha	Pole Position	Vuelta rápida	Piloto ganador	Equipo ganador	Constructor	Ref.
1	(São Paulo (state)) Grande Prêmio de São Paulo	22 de febrero	(Brazil) Enzo Valentim Garcia	(Brazil) Guilherme Brito	(Brazil) Guilherme Brito	(Brazil) Pitico Race Team/Nacar Yamaha	(Japan) Yamaha	
2	(São Paulo (state)) Grande Prêmio Petrobras	12 de abril	(Brazil) Enzo Valentim Garcia	(Argentina) Emiliano Lancion	(Argentina) Emiliano Lancion	(Brazil) MG/AD78 Yamaha Racing	(Japan) Yamaha	
3	(São Paulo (state)) Grande Prêmio Elf	24 de mayo	(Brazil) Humberto Maier "Turquinho Jr"	(Brazil) Alex Milan	(Brazil) Guilherme Brito	(Brazil) Pitico Race Team/Nacar Yamaha	(Japan) Yamaha	
4	(São Paulo (state)) Grande Prêmio Yamaha	12 de julio	(Brazil) Guilherme Brito	(Brazil) Enzo Valentim Garcia	(Argentina) Emiliano Lancion	(Brazil) MG/AD78 Yamaha Racing	(Japan) Yamaha	
5	(Paraná (state)) Grande Prêmio de Curitiba	30 de agosto	(Brazil) Guilherme Brito	(Brazil) Bruno César Borges	(Brazil) Leandro Bagnarelli	(Brazil) Motonil Motors	(Japan) Yamaha	
6	Grande Prêmio de Goiás	20 de septiembre	(Brazil) Guilherme Brito	(Brazil) Guilherme Brito	(Uruguay) Facundo Llambias	Qatar Racing Team	(Japan) Yamaha	
7	(Goiás) Grande Prêmio das Esmeraldas	17 de octubre	(Argentina) Emiliano Lancion	(Brazil) Guilherme Brito	(Argentina) Emiliano Lancion	(Brazil) MG/AD78 Yamaha Racing	(Japan) Yamaha	
8	(Goiás) Grande Prêmio de Goiânia	18 de octubre	(Brazil) Humberto Maier "Turquinho Jr"	(Brazil) Humberto Maier "Turquinho Jr"	(Brazil) Humberto Maier "Turquinho Jr"	(Brazil) Yamalub Racing	(Japan) Yamaha	
9	(Paraná (state)) Grande Prêmio do Paraná	8 de noviembre	(Spain) Yeray Ruiz	(Brazil) Ton Kawakami	(Brazil) Ton Kawakami	(Brazil) PlayStation Yamaha Racing	(Japan) Yamaha	
10	(São Paulo (state)) Grande Prêmio Suhai	26 de noviembre	(Brazil) Kaywan Freire	(Spain) Yeray Ruiz	(Brazil) Kaywan Freire	(Brazil) Yamalub Racing	(Japan) Yamaha	
11	(São Paulo (state)) Grande Prêmio de Interlagos	27 de noviembre	(Spain) Yeray Ruiz	(Spain) Yeray Ruiz	(Brazil) Ton Kawakami	(Brazil) PlayStation Yamaha Racing	(Japan) Yamaha	

=== Honda Junior Cup ===
Ronda	Circuito	Fecha	Pole Position	Vuelta rápida	Piloto ganador	Equipo ganador	Constructor	Ref.
1	(São Paulo (state)) Grande Prêmio de São Paulo	22 de febrero	(Brazil) Pedro Balla	(Brazil) Pedro Balla	(Brazil) Pedro Balla	(Japan) Idemitsu Honda Team	(Japan) Honda	
2	(São Paulo (state)) Grande Prêmio Petrobras	12 de abril	(Brazil) Pedro Balla	(Brazil) João Teixeira	(Brazil) João Teixeira	(Brazil) Certainty Racing	(Japan) Honda	
3	(São Paulo (state)) Grande Prêmio Elf	24 de mayo	(Brazil) João Teixeira	(Brazil) Brayann dos Santos Silva "Ligeirinho"	(Brazil) João Teixeira	(Brazil) Certainty Racing	(Japan) Honda	
4	(São Paulo (state)) Grande Prêmio Yamaha	12 de julio	(Brazil) João Teixeira	(Brazil) João Teixeira	(Brazil) Pedro Balla	(Japan) Idemitsu Honda Team	(Japan) Honda	
5	(Paraná (state)) Grande Prêmio de Curitiba	30 de agosto	(Brazil) João Teixeira	(Brazil) João Teixeira	(Brazil) João Teixeira	(Brazil) Certainty Racing	(Japan) Honda	
6	Grande Prêmio de Goiás	20 de septiembre	(Brazil) Pedro Balla	(Brazil) João Teixeira	(Brazil) João Teixeira	(Brazil) Certainty Racing	(Japan) Honda	
7	(Goiás) Grande Prêmio das Esmeraldas	17 de octubre	(Brazil) Brayann dos Santos Silva "Ligeirinho"	(Brazil) Brayann dos Santos Silva "Ligeirinho"	(Brazil) Pedro Balla	(Japan) Idemitsu Honda Team	(Japan) Honda	
8	(Goiás) Grande Prêmio de Goiânia	18 de octubre	(Brazil) João Henrique Fascineli	(Brazil) Brayann dos Santos Silva "Ligeirinho"	(Brazil) Matheus Oliveira	(Brazil) Huber Racing	(Japan) Honda	
9	(Paraná (state)) Grande Prêmio do Paraná	8 de noviembre	(Brazil) Pedro Balla	(Brazil) Brayann dos Santos Silva "Ligeirinho"	(Brazil) João Teixeira	(Brazil) Certainty Racing	(Japan) Honda	
10	(São Paulo (state)) Grande Prêmio Suhai	26 de noviembre	(Brazil) Brayann dos Santos Silva "Ligeirinho"	(Brazil) Matheus Oliveira	(Brazil) Pedro Balla	(Japan) Idemitsu Honda Team	(Japan) Honda	
11	(São Paulo (state)) Grande Prêmio de Interlagos	27 de noviembre	(Brazil) João Teixeira	(Brazil) Brayann dos Santos Silva "Ligeirinho"	(Brazil) João Teixeira	(Brazil) Certainty Racing	(Japan) Honda	

== Standings ==
Classifications for the Brazilian Superbike Championship

=== Superbike ===
Icono	Categoría
PRO	PRO
EXT	Extreme

Pos.	Rider	Moto	Class	(São Paulo (state)) SPO	(São Paulo (state)) PET	(São Paulo (state)) ELF	(São Paulo (state)) YAM	(Paraná (state)) CTB	(Goiás) GOI	(Goiás) ESM	(Goiás) GNA	(Paraná (state)) PAR	(São Paulo (state)) SUH	(São Paulo (state)) INT	Pts
1	(Brazil) Eric Granado	Honda	PRO	Ret	1	1	1		1	1	1	1	1	1	225
2	(Brazil) Pedro Sampaio	Honda	PRO	3	8	4	4	Ret	5	2	3	5	2	2	148
3	(Brazil) Alex Barros	BMW	PRO	2	10	2	5	2	2	3	2	4			146
4	(Brazil) Danilo Lewis	BMW	PRO	5	4	6		1	3	Ret	14	2	4	3	126
5	(Uruguay) Maximiliano Gerardo	Kawasaki	PRO	4	2	5	3	9	4			3	3	4	125
6	(Brazil) Rodrigo Dazzi	BMW	EXT	Ret	5	7	6	7	7	6	5	7	6	7	97
7	(Brazil) Diego Viveiros	BMW	EXT	7	12	9	7	5	9	5	6	9	8	9	90
8	(Brazil) Júlio Fortunato	BMW	EXT		14	11	10	6	8	4	7	10	7	6	78
9	(Australia) Anthony West	Kawasaki	PRO	1	3	3	2								77
10	(Brazil) Mauriti Ribeiro Jr	BMW	EXT	14	9	8	Ret	8		Ret	9	6	9	8	57
11	(Brazil) Marcelo Skaf	Kawasaki	EXT	Ret	6	14	Ret	3		DNS	NC		10	12	39
12	(Brazil) Bruno Corano	BMW	PRO	6	17		8			DNS	8		DNS	DNS	26
13	(Brazil) Matheus Barbosa	Kawasaki	PRO										5	5	22
14	(Brazil) Leandro Arruda	Suzuki	PRO	13						INF	4		NC	DNS	16
15	(Brazil) Ian Testa	Ducati	EXT	12	18	13	9	Ret							14
16	(Argentina) Fabrízio Palma	Yamaha	PRO		13			DNS	14			8			13
17	(Qatar) Sharbel EL Hajjar	Kawasaki	EXT					4				Ret			13
18	(Brazil) Sérgio Ribeiro	Suzuki	PRO	9			DNQ						DNS	10	13
19	(Brazil) Kioman Muñoz	BMW	EXT						6				Ret	Ret	10
20	(Brazil) Fábio Franzoni	Kawasaki	PRO	Ret		Ret	11					DSQ	11	DNS	10
21	(Argentina) Diego Pierluigi	Yamaha	PRO	Ret	7										9
22	(Brazil) José Luiz Teixeira Jr "Cachorrão"	Honda	PRO		11	12									9
23	(Brazil) Danilo Berto	Kawasaki	EXT	8	DNS										8
24	(Brazil) Hamilton Tiziano	Aprilia	EXT	11				DNS	13						8
25	(Brazil) Marcus Garcia	Moto Guzzi	PRO				13						DNS	11	8
26	(Brazil) Rodrigo Helal	Ducati	EXT	10	DNQ		15						Ret	NC	7
27	(Brazil) Davi Costa	BMW	EXT			10									6
28	(Brazil) Orion Barreto	Derbi	EXT						10						6
29	(Brazil) Silvano Falcão	Kawasaki	EXT							DNF	10				6
30	(Chile) Maximiliano Cerato	Honda	PRO					Ret	11			Ret	DNQ	Ret	5
31	(Brazil) Guilherme Gil	Kalex	EXT						DNS			11			5
32	(Brazil) Fernanda Barth	Cagiva	PRO							DNS	11				5
33	(Brazil) Giovanni Mackedanz	Benelli	EXT				12								4
34	(Spain) Iker Veja	Yamaha	EXT						12						4
35	(Brazil) Tiago Pedroso	KTM	PRO	DNS	15		14					NPQ			3
36	(Spain) Gabriel Rabanillo	Yamaha	PRO							DSQ	13	Ret			3
37	(Uruguay) Pablo Hernández	Minarelli	PRO						Ret				Ret	13	3
38	(Brazil) Juninho Trudes	Kawasaki	PRO		DNS										0
39	(Brazil) Lucas Dezeró	BMW	PRO		Ret		Ret								0
40	(Brazil) Leandro Espósito	Yamaha	EXT		Ret	DNS									0
41	(Brazil) Hilton Ferreira	Aprilia	EXT	Ret	Ret										0
42	(Colombia) Camilo Camacho	KTM	PRO	DNS											0
43	(Argentina) Fabián Sánchez	Derbi	PRO		16	Ret						DNS			0
44	(Argentina) Matías Benítez	Kawasaki	EXT		DSQ	Ret									0
45	(Brazil) Lizandro Borges	Cagiva	PRO					Ret							0
46	(Brazil) Bruno Ferreira	Moto Guzzi	PRO					Ret							0
47	(Brazil) Wágner Müller	Benelli	EXT							Ret	DNS	DNS			0
48	(Brazil) Fernando Carrion	Kawasaki	EXT							Ret	Ret	DNS			0
Pos	Piloto	Moto	Clase	(São Paulo (state)) SPO	(São Paulo (state)) PET	(São Paulo (state)) ELF	(São Paulo (state)) YAM	(Paraná (state)) CTB	(Goiás) GOI	(Goiás) ESM	(Goiás) GNA	(Paraná (state)) PAR	(São Paulo (state)) SUH	(São Paulo (state)) INT	Pts

Colour	Result
Gold	Winner
Silver	Second place
Bronze	Third place
Green	Points classification
Blue	Non-points classification
Blue	Non-classified finish (NC)
Purple	Retired, not classified (Ret)
Red	Did not qualify (DNQ)
Red	Did not pre-qualify (DNPQ)
Black	Disqualified (DSQ)
White	Did not start (DNS)
White	Withdrew (WD)
White	Race cancelled (C)
Blank	Did not practice (DNP)
Blank	Did not arrive (DNA)
Blank	Excluded (EX)

=== Constructors' standings ===
Pos	Constructor	(São Paulo (state)) SPO	(São Paulo (state)) PET	(São Paulo (state)) ELF	(São Paulo (state)) YAM	(Paraná (state)) CTB	(Goiás) GOI	(Goiás) ESM	(Goiás) GNA	(Paraná (state)) PAR	(São Paulo (state)) SUH	(São Paulo (state)) INT	Pts
1	(Japan) Honda	3	1	1	1	3	1	1	1	1	1	1	257
2	(Germany) BMW	2	4	2	5	1	2	3	2	2	4	3	194
3	(Japan) Kawasaki	1	2	3	2	3	4	DNF	10	3	3	4	161
4	(Japan) Suzuki	9			DNQ			INF	4		NC	10	26
5	(Japan) Yamaha	Ret	7			DNS	14			8			19
6	(Italy) Ducati	10	18	13	9	Ret					Ret	NC	16
7	(Italy) Aprilia	11	Ret			DNS	13						8
8	(Italy) Moto Guzzi				13	Ret					DNS	11	8
9	(Spain) Derbi		16	Ret			10			DNS			6
10	(Germany) Kalex						DNS			11			5
11	(Italy) Cagiva					Ret		DNS	11				5
12	(Italy) Benelli				12								4
13	(Austria) KTM	DNS	15		14				Ret	NPQ	DNS		3
14	(Italy) Minarelli						Ret				Ret	13	3
Pos	Constructor	(São Paulo (state)) SPO	(São Paulo (state)) PET	(São Paulo (state)) ELF	(São Paulo (state)) YAM	(Paraná (state)) CTB	(Goiás) GOI	(Goiás) ESM	(Goiás) GNA	(Paraná (state)) PAR	(São Paulo (state)) SUH	(São Paulo (state)) INT	Pts

=== Superbike Light ===
Icono	Categoría
LGT	Light
MAS	Master
EVO	EVO
1000	EVO 1000
EVM	EVO Master
STK	Stock

Pos.	Rider	Moto	Class	(São Paulo (state)) SPO	(São Paulo (state)) PET	(São Paulo (state)) ELF	(São Paulo (state)) YAM	(Paraná (state)) CTB	(Goiás) GOI	(Goiás) ESM	(Goiás) GNA	(Paraná (state)) PAR	(São Paulo (state)) SUH	(São Paulo (state)) INT	Pts
1	(Brazil) Márcio Bortolini	BMW	1000	2	6	Ret	1	2	1	1	17	1	5		161
2	(Brazil) Bruno Corano	BMW	EVO	1	1	Ret	3	3	6	4	18	3	DNS	1	146
3	(Brazil) Felipe Comerlatto	BMW	1000	35	2	3	2	1	8	7			3	4	127
4	(Brazil) André Veríssimo	Kawasaki	1000	Ret	3	7	4	4	2	2	Ret	5	INF	2	122
5	(Brazil) Marcelo Skaf	Kawasaki	EVO	3	8	15	28	5	5	5	19	2	2	DNS	98
6	(Brazil) Victor Villaverde	BMW	LGT	10	9	11	6	22	7	6	2	7	10	3	98
7	(Brazil) Cristiano Nogueira	Kawasaki	EVM	12		NC	10	14	13	11	8	10	13	8	73
8	(Brazil) Juracy Rodrigues "Black"	BMW	EVM	4	4	1	5	6							72
9	(Brazil) Guto Figueiredo	Kawasaki	STK	27	DNS	20	8	18	10	8	4	9	7	17	57
10	(Brazil) Rodrigo Cabecinha	Suzuki	1000	9	20	4	18	9	DSQ	3	Ret	4			56
11	(Brazil) Osvaldo Jorge "Duende"	BMW	STK	11	16		26	7	4	9	11	6	9	Ret	56
12	(Brazil) Guilherme Neto	BMW	LGT	8	10	DSQ	Ret	20	16	10	1	21	14	13	50
13	(Brazil) Murilo Tom	Honda	LGT	19	13	NPQ	DNS	12	20	13	3	8		7	43
14	(Brazil) Raphael Arcari "Fletado"	BMW	LGT	5	33	18	7		3	Ret					36
15	(Brazil) Marcos Ramalho	BMW	EVM	18	32	Ret	9	19	11	Ret	5	11		12	32
16	(Brazil) Márcio Manow Martins	Kawasaki	LGT										1	10	31
17	(Brazil) Ramon Cruz Miquilini	Kawasaki	LGT	15	19	INF	20	Ret			6	13	12	9	25
18	(Brazil) Cassiano Palomo Macedo	BMW	LGT	Ret	Ret	2	16		14	19				21	22
19	(Brazil) Carlos Fuzza	Honda	1000	25	Ret	5					20	DNS	8	20	19
20	(Brazil) Magno "Menino de Ouro"	Kawasaki	STK	DNQ	DNS		12	15	9	12	13	18	DNA		19
21	(Brazil) Fábio Pitta	BMW	EVO	14	Ret	16	13	8					11	Ret	18
22	(Brazil) Luciano Pokémon	Suzuki	STK	6	11										15
23	(Brazil) Diogo Corrêa	Ducati	STK	28		9		Ret	18	20	9	15			15
24	(Brazil) Gustavo Silveira "Gão"	Kawasaki	1000										4	Ret	13
25	(Brazil) Marcelo Marques	Kawasaki	LGT		17		Ret	Ret	Ret	17	7	12	Ret	Ret	13
26	(Brazil) Édson Luiz Mamute	BMW	EVO	13	7										12
27	(Brazil) Cléber Pires	Kawasaki	LGT	7	14								15		12
28	(Brazil) Rubem Nico Mardegan	BMW	STK	22	15	6		21						5	11
29	(Brazil) Maurício Lingüiça	Suzuki	EVO	DNS	5	22									11
30	(Brazil) Tiago Crespo	Kawasaki	LGT		26		23	Ret			16	Ret	6	26	10
31	(Brazil) Eduardo Nascimento "Edu"	KTM	1000		DNS									6	10
32	(Brazil) Juliano Ferrante	Kawasaki	EVO	16	Ret	Ret		11						11	10
33	(Brazil) Nélson Gonçalves "Mágico"	Suzuki	MAS	26	24	DSQ	22	INF	17	18	10	14	16	24	8
34	(Brazil) Marcelo Miarelli	Honda	1000	23	DNS	8									8
35	(Brazil) Sérgio Prates	BMW	1000	20	30	10			15	16	DNP	16		25	7
36	(Brazil) Renê Ferreira	BMW	MAS					10							6
37	(Brazil) Ricardo Seiji Hayashi	Kawasaki	EVM		12		14							Ret	6
38	(Brazil) Carlos Ronan	BMW	LGT				11								5
39	(Brazil) Pablo Flores Nunes	Yamaha	EVO	17	34		17	17	12	15			17	23	5
40	(Brazil) Danilo Costa	Kawasaki	LGT	31	INF		21	DNF			12	17			4
41	(Brazil) Adriano Lima	Kawasaki	1000	21		12									4
42	(Brazil) Édson Errera	Kawasaki	MAS	33	31	13	24	NE	19	21	15	19	19	28	4
43	(Brazil) Rivaldo Borges	Kawasaki	1000	36	18	Ret	15		NPQ	14					3
44	(Brazil) Peterson Pet	BMW	STK	Ret				13						18	3
45	(Brazil) Eduardo Aceto	BMW	MAS	34	25	Ret	25	NQ	22	23	14	20	20		2
46	(Brazil) Luka Veríssimo	Aprilia	1000		NPQ	14									2
47	(Brazil) Juninho Moreira	Ducati	LGT											14	2
48	(Brazil) Thiago Eduardo Castro	BMW	STK				WD	Ret						15	1
49	(Brazil) Agnaldo Schmitz "Iron Man"	BMW	1000					16					18		0
50	(Brazil) Leandro Ferreira	Kawasaki	LGT											16	0
51	(Paraguay) Nicolas Agüero Castorino	Honda	STK		Ret	19	Ret								0
52	(Brazil) Daniel Sánches	BMW	LGT				19								0
53	(Brazil) Richard "Bochecha"	BMW	1000											19	0
54	(Brazil) Pedro Corrêa "Bonitão"	BMW	MAS						21	22					0
55	(Brazil) Thiago Felipe Fonseca "Doidinho"	Ducati	1000		21										0
56	(Brazil) Júnior Américo	Kawasaki	EVM											22	0
57	(Brazil) Fabrício Zamperetti	Kawasaki	LGT	24	28										0
58	(Brazil) Ewerton Nakamura	BMW	LGT		29	17									0
59	(Brazil) Kléber Reimberg	BMW	MAS		23	21									0
60	(Brazil) Édson Farias	Aprilia	MAS		22										0
61	(Brazil) Remi Toscano	KTM	MAS				27		23	24					0
62	(Brazil) Válter Embaixador	BMW	LGT				Ret		Ret	25					0
63	(Brazil) Gustavo de Sousa	Kawasaki	MAS										Ret	27	0
64	(Brazil) Eduardo Lopes	Aprilia	STK		27										0
65	(Brazil) Adílson Callix "Didi"	Honda	LGT	29	NC										0
66	(Brazil) Leonardo Ferreira	MV Agusta	LGT											29	0
67	(Brazil) Eduardo Garcia	Kawasaki	LGT	32											0
68	(Brazil) Leandro Bressan	Suzuki	MAS	30											0
69	(Brazil) Henrique Poli Jr	KTM	1000									DSQ			0
70	(Brazil) Fabrício Marciano de Freitas	Yamaha	1000	NC											0
71	(Brazil) Leandro Siqueira	MV Agusta	LGT								Ret				0
72	(Brazil) Carlos Sakurai "Kaká"	BMW	LGT	Ret	Ret										0
73	(Brazil) Maurício Protta	Kawasaki	LGT		Ret		DNS								0
74	(Brazil) Marcos Migliorelli	BMW	LGT						DNS	DNS					0
75	(Brazil) Thiago Cordaro	Suzuki	LGT			Wth									0
76	(Brazil) Clayton Barbosa	BMW	LGT		Ret										0
77	(Paraguay) Pedro Valiente	Yamaha	LGT		DNS										0
78	(Brazil) Thiago Godoy	BMW	LGT				Ret							NC	0
79	(Brazil) Herlan Conti	KTM	EVM						NPQ	NPQ					0
80	(Brazil) Rogério Gentil Fernandes	Kawasaki	EVM	Ret											0
81	(Brazil) Édison Simões	Kawasaki	MAS	Ret					AN	DNS					0
82	(Brazil) José Cunha	Kawasaki	MAS		DNF										0
83	(Brazil) Jonathan Polaco	BMW	STK										Ret		0
Pos	Piloto	Moto	Clase	(São Paulo (state)) SPO	(São Paulo (state)) PET	(São Paulo (state)) ELF	(São Paulo (state)) YAM	(Paraná (state)) CTB	(Goiás) GOI	(Goiás) ESM	(Goiás) GNA	(Paraná (state)) PAR	(São Paulo (state)) SUH	(São Paulo (state)) INT	Pts

Colour	Result
Gold	Winner
Silver	Second place
Bronze	Third place
Green	Points classification
Blue	Non-points classification
Blue	Non-classified finish (NC)
Purple	Retired, not classified (Ret)
Red	Did not qualify (DNQ)
Red	Did not pre-qualify (DNPQ)
Black	Disqualified (DSQ)
White	Did not start (DNS)
White	Withdrew (WD)
White	Race cancelled (C)
Blank	Did not practice (DNP)
Blank	Did not arrive (DNA)
Blank	Excluded (EX)

=== Constructors' standings ===
Pos	Constructor	(São Paulo (state)) SPO	(São Paulo (state)) PET	(São Paulo (state)) ELF	(São Paulo (state)) YAM	(Paraná (state)) CTB	(Goiás) GOI	(Goiás) ESM	(Goiás) GNA	(Paraná (state)) PAR	(São Paulo (state)) SUH	(São Paulo (state)) INT	Pts
1	(Germany) BMW	1	1	1	1	1	1	1	1	1	3	1	266
2	(Japan) Kawasaki	3	3	7	4	4	2	2	4	2	1	2	185
3	(Japan) Suzuki	6	5	4	18	9	17	3	10	4	16	24	76
4	(Japan) Honda	19	13	5	Ret	12	20	13	3	8	8	7	62
5	(Italy) Ducati	28	21	9		Ret	18	20	9	15		14	17
6	(Japan) Yamaha	17	34		17	17	12	15			17	23	5
7	(Italy) Aprilia		22	14									2
8	(Austria) KTM		DNS		27		23	24					0
9	(Italy) MV Agusta								Ret			29	0
Pos	Constructor	(São Paulo (state)) SPO	(São Paulo (state)) PET	(São Paulo (state)) ELF	(São Paulo (state)) YAM	(Paraná (state)) CTB	(Goiás) GOI	(Goiás) ESM	(Goiás) GNA	(Paraná (state)) PAR	(São Paulo (state)) SUH	(São Paulo (state)) INT	Pts

=== Superbike Escola 1000 ===
Icono	Categoría
SBK	Superbike

Pos.	Rider	Moto	Class	(São Paulo (state)) SPO	(São Paulo (state)) PET	(São Paulo (state)) ELF	(São Paulo (state)) YAM	(Paraná (state)) CTB	(Goiás) GOI	(Goiás) ESM	(Goiás) GNA	(Paraná (state)) PAR	(São Paulo (state)) SUH	(São Paulo (state)) INT	Pts
1	(Brazil) Rafael Palmieri	BMW	SBK	5	2	9	1	1	1	DSQ	DSQ	1	3	1	187
2	(Brazil) Luiz H. Bertoli	Kawasaki	SBK	13	4	4	2	3	2	1	2	2	2	3	186
3	(Brazil) Fábio "Queiroz"	BMW	SBK	3	1	Ret	3	6	3	2	3	3	1	2	180
4	(Brazil) Éverton Antônio Pires	BMW	SBK	8		1	5	Ret	Ret	9	12	Wth	5	4	79
5	(Brazil) Júnior Moisés	Kawasaki	SBK		14	5	6		6	Ret	10	7	4	5	72
6	(Brazil) Bruno Eduardo "Bruninho"	Suzuki	SBK	11	3	Ret	4	Ret	7	16	11	DNS	8	10	62
7	(Brazil) Eduardo Lopes	Ducati	SBK	2						4	1				58
8	(Brazil) Marco Pérez "Marcão"	BMW	SBK	9	5	3	Ret	7	Ret	15	14	DSQ	Ret	DNS	46
9	(Brazil) Douglas Russo	Kawasaki	SBK	7	7	DSQ	Ret	DNS	5	18	Ret	DNS	Ret	11	34
10	(Brazil) Eduardo Andrioli	Kawasaki	SBK					2	4						33
11	(Brazil) Guilherme Machado	BMW	SBK	12	12	6				14	15	9			28
12	(Brazil) Fabiano Tofoli "Binho81"	Kawasaki	SBK	14		7	7	Ret	8	17	16		Ret	DNS	28
13	(Brazil) Willian Souza Barros	Honda	SBK				10			8	4				27
14	(Brazil) Wesley Lima	BMW	SBK							3	6				26
15	(Brazil) Everson dos Santos	Kawasaki	SBK					4				4			26
16	(Paraguay) Nicolas Agüero Castorino	Honda	SBK	1											25
17	(Brazil) Thiago Eduardo "Cão"	BMW	SBK	4								5			24
18	(Brazil) Marcelino Zambuzi "Kiko"	Kawasaki	SBK							5	5				22
19	(Brazil) Rinaldo Mello	Triumph	SBK							6	8	13			21
20	(Brazil) Jackson "Baianin Speed"	BMW	SBK			2									20
21	(Brazil) Sérgio da Silva "Serginho"	Yamaha	SBK										6	6	20
22	(Brazil) Pedro Henrique Santos	BMW	SBK							7	7				18
23	(Brazil) Édison "Ed Jr"	Honda	SBK										7	8	17
24	(Brazil) Augusto de Oliveira	Honda	SBK	10	Ret							6			16
25	(Brazil) Fábio Nakano	Kawasaki	SBK		8							8			16
26	(Brazil) Ian Beltrão	BMW	SBK										9	7	16
27	(Brazil) Eldiley Emílio "Minduim"	Kawasaki	SBK										10	9	13
28	(Brazil) Gérson Caleme	Honda	SBK		15					12	9	Ret			12
29	(Brazil) Leandro Pardini	BMW	SBK		10							10			12
30	(Brazil) Ariston P. Pereira	BMW	SBK					5							11
31	(Brazil) Marcelo Ribeiro	MV Agusta	SBK	6											10
32	(Brazil) Danilo Reis	Kawasaki	SBK		6										10
33	(Brazil) Gérson Caleb	Honda	SBK				8								8
34	(Brazil) Bruno Amate	Kawasaki	SBK		13							11			8
35	(Brazil) Rafael S. Félix	Honda	SBK			8									8
36	(Brazil) Gérson Luiz Jr	Honda	SBK		9										7
37	(Brazil) Elias Souza	Honda	SBK				9								7
38	(Brazil) Alexandre Dante	BMW	SBK						9						7
39	(Brazil) Júnior Carvalho	BMW	SBK	15	Ret					13	13				7
40	(Brazil) Carlos Eduardo Rodrigues	Kawasaki	SBK						10						6
41	(Brazil) André Pretto	Triumph	SBK							10	Ret	Ret			6
42	(Brazil) Alessandro Strambeck	Suzuki	SBK		DNS					11	Ret				5
43	(Brazil) Evandro Hernandes "Vandão"	Yamaha	SBK		11										5
44	(Brazil) Peter Clay	Kawasaki	SBK		DNQ							12			4
45	(Brazil) Paulo Krambeck	Suzuki	SBK									14			2
46	(Brazil) André L. Aguiar	Ducati	SBK	16											0
47	(Brazil) Rômulo Resende	BMW	SBK	17											0
48	(Brazil) Rodrigo Araújo do Vale	MV Agusta	SBK	18											0
49	(Brazil) Cícero Ribeiro	Kawasaki	SBK										DNS	Ret	0
50	(Brazil) Danilo Brum	BMW	SBK	Ret											0
51	(Brazil) Wendelis Carvalho	Kawasaki	SBK	Ret											0
52	(Brazil) Francis Pontes	Kawasaki	SBK	Ret											0
53	(Brazil) Caio Morisco	Suzuki	SBK	Ret											0
54	(Brazil) Tércio P. Castilho	Honda	SBK		Ret										0
55	(Brazil) Diogenes Jr	Kawasaki	SBK		Ret										0
56	(Brazil) Rogério Rocha	Ducati	SBK		Ret										0
Pos	Piloto	Moto	Clase	(São Paulo (state)) SPO	(São Paulo (state)) PET	(São Paulo (state)) ELF	(São Paulo (state)) YAM	(Paraná (state)) CTB	(Goiás) GOI	(Goiás) ESM	(Goiás) GNA	(Paraná (state)) PAR	(São Paulo (state)) SUH	(São Paulo (state)) INT	Pts

Colour	Result
Gold	Winner
Silver	Second place
Bronze	Third place
Green	Points classification
Blue	Non-points classification
Blue	Non-classified finish (NC)
Purple	Retired, not classified (Ret)
Red	Did not qualify (DNQ)
Red	Did not pre-qualify (DNPQ)
Black	Disqualified (DSQ)
White	Did not start (DNS)
White	Withdrew (WD)
White	Race cancelled (C)
Blank	Did not practice (DNP)
Blank	Did not arrive (DNA)
Blank	Excluded (EX)

=== Constructors' standings ===
Pos	Constructor	(São Paulo (state)) SPO	(São Paulo (state)) PET	(São Paulo (state)) ELF	(São Paulo (state)) YAM	(Paraná (state)) CTB	(Goiás) GOI	(Goiás) ESM	(Goiás) GNA	(Paraná (state)) PAR	(São Paulo (state)) SUH	(São Paulo (state)) INT	Pts
1	(Germany) BMW	5	1	1	1	1	1	2	3	1	1	1	247
2	(Japan) Kawasaki	7	4	4	2	2	2	1	2	2	2	3	196
3	(Japan) Honda	1	9	8	8			12	9	6	7	8	86
4	(Japan) Suzuki	11	3	Ret	4	Ret	7	16	11	14	8	10	64
5	(Italy) Ducati	2	Ret					4	1				58
6	(Japan) Yamaha		11								6	6	25
7	(United Kingdom) Triumph							6	8	13			21
8	(Italy) MV Agusta	6											10
Pos	Constructor	(São Paulo (state)) SPO	(São Paulo (state)) PET	(São Paulo (state)) ELF	(São Paulo (state)) YAM	(Paraná (state)) CTB	(Goiás) GOI	(Goiás) ESM	(Goiás) GNA	(Paraná (state)) PAR	(São Paulo (state)) SUH	(São Paulo (state)) INT	Pts

=== Supersport 600 ===
Icono	Categoría
PRO	PRO
EXT	Extreme
MAS	Master
STK	Stock

Pos.	Rider	Moto	Class	(São Paulo (state)) SPO	(São Paulo (state)) PET	(São Paulo (state)) ELF	(São Paulo (state)) YAM	(Paraná (state)) CTB	(Goiás) GOI	(Goiás) ESM	(Goiás) GNA	(Paraná (state)) PAR	(São Paulo (state)) SUH	(São Paulo (state)) INT	Pts
1	(Brazil) Matheus Barbosa	Kawasaki	PRO	1	1	1	14	8	1	1	1	1	2	4	225
2	(Brazil) Leonardo Tamburro	Kawasaki	PRO	2	2	3	1	1	3	2	3	3	1	1	224
3	(Brazil) José Duarte	Kawasaki	PRO	9	5	4	3	4	4	5	Ret	4	13	3	116
4	(Brazil) Arthur Costa	Kawasaki	PRO	5	3	2	2	12	2	4	5				115
5	(Paraguay) Pedro Fidélis Valiente	Yamaha	EXT			7	4	2	5	6	4	6	15	6	97
6	(Argentina) Mauro Passarino	Yamaha	PRO					13		3	2	2	6	2	89
7	(Brazil) Gustavo da Silveira "Gão"	Kawasaki	EXT	10	7	10		5	6	Ret	8	7	4	11	87
8	(Brazil) Luís Ferraz	Kawasaki	EXT	11	8	11	12	6	7	8	11	9	5	Ret	72
9	(Brazil) Maurício Marques	Kawasaki	STK		12	12	6	3	11	Ret	7	14	Ret	7	59
10	(Brazil) Daniel Gurgel Mendonça	Kawasaki	PRO	8	9	8	DNQ						3	5	50
11	(Brazil) Daniel Mos	Kawasaki	STK	18	14	14	10	9		13	15		9	8	36
12	(Brazil) Victor Luciano "Durval Careca"	Kawasaki	PRO	6	4	6									33
13	(Brazil) Luiz Cerciari	Yamaha	PRO	12	DNS	5	5		Ret	Ret	DNS		10	Ret	32
14	(Brazil) Marcos Fortunato	Kawasaki	EXT		13	17	11	Ret	9	INF	12	11	17	9	31
15	(Brazil) Régis Santos	Kawasaki	EXT	26		16	7	10	8			8			31
16	(Argentina) Sebastián Solón	Kawasaki	PRO	4	6	Ret	Ret								23
17	(Brazil) Walter J. Barros	Kawasaki	EXT				8			7	10				23
18	(Brazil) Gérverson Paz de Oliveira "Déris"	Triumph	STK	24			9	Ret		14	14		8	Ret	19
19	(Brazil) Eduardo Marques	Honda	EXT							9	6				17
20	(Brazil) Niko Ramos	Kawasaki	PRO	3											16
21	(Brazil) Rafael Paschoalin	Yamaha	PRO	7	10	Ret									15
22	(Brazil) Rubens Luís Arenas Bosch	Kawasaki	MAS	25		21	13		13				16	14	14
23	(Brazil) Franco Lopes	Triumph	MAS	22	18	Ret		11				13	14	13	13
24	(Brazil) Vicente Flores	Kawasaki	MAS							11	9				12
25	(Brazil) Paulo Foroni	Triumph	MAS									12	12	12	12
26	(Brazil) Hebert Pereira	Kawasaki	PRO									5			11
27	(Brazil) Ives Moraes	Triumph	PRO	NC		9				12	DNS				11
28	(Brazil) Rodrigo Medeiros	Ducati	PRO										11	10	11
29	(Brazil) Tirshen Mourão	Honda	STK		16	20		7							9
30	(Brazil) Júlio César Parra Neto	Kawasaki	EXT	Ret									7	Ret	9
31	(Brazil) Olímpio Filho	Kawasaki	MAS							10	13				9
32	(Brazil) Breno Barbosa	Yamaha	EXT	Ret								10			6
33	(Brazil) Rogério Gentil Fernandes	Kawasaki	MAS						10			Ret			6
34	(Brazil) Ricardo Fox	Ducati	PRO		11										5
35	(Brazil) Ricardo Barlette	Kawasaki	STK		15	19			12						5
36	(Brazil) Marco Ferreira	Yamaha	EXT	14	Ret	13									5
37	(Brazil) Henrique Daniel	Kawasaki	EXT	13	Wth	Ret									3
38	(Brazil) Lucas Dezeró	Kawasaki	PRO	15								15			2
39	(Argentina) Lautaro Espejo	Yamaha	EXT			15									1
40	(Brazil) Luka Veríssimo	Ducati	STK	16											0
41	(Brazil) Alexandre Dell'Aquila	Honda	EXT	19	17	Ret									0
42	(Brazil) Leonel V. Carvalho Jr	Kawasaki	EXT	17											0
43	(Brazil) Carlos Alberto Ribeiro	Kawasaki	EXT	21	Ret	18									0
44	(Brazil) Maurício Cassiano	Kawasaki	STK	20											0
45	(Brazil) Domenico Micaroni	Honda	EXT	23											0
46	(Brazil) Vinícius Ramos	Ducati	STK			22									0
47	(Brazil) Felipe Bazolli	Triumph	EXT	DNS											0
48	(Brazil) José Cunha	Yamaha	MAS	DNS											0
Pos	Piloto	Moto	Clase	(São Paulo (state)) SPO	(São Paulo (state)) PET	(São Paulo (state)) ELF	(São Paulo (state)) YAM	(Paraná (state)) CTB	(Goiás) GOI	(Goiás) ESM	(Goiás) GNA	(Paraná (state)) PAR	(São Paulo (state)) SUH	(São Paulo (state)) INT	Pts

Colour	Result
Gold	Winner
Silver	Second place
Bronze	Third place
Green	Points classification
Blue	Non-points classification
Blue	Non-classified finish (NC)
Purple	Retired, not classified (Ret)
Red	Did not qualify (DNQ)
Red	Did not pre-qualify (DNPQ)
Black	Disqualified (DSQ)
White	Did not start (DNS)
White	Withdrew (WD)
White	Race cancelled (C)
Blank	Did not practice (DNP)
Blank	Did not arrive (DNA)
Blank	Excluded (EX)

=== Constructors' standings ===
Pos	Constructor	(São Paulo (state)) SPO	(São Paulo (state)) PET	(São Paulo (state)) ELF	(São Paulo (state)) YAM	(Paraná (state)) CTB	(Goiás) GOI	(Goiás) ESM	(Goiás) GNA	(Paraná (state)) PAR	(São Paulo (state)) SUH	(São Paulo (state)) INT	Pts
1	(Japan) Kawasaki	1	1	1	1	1	1	1	1	1	1	1	275
2	(Japan) Yamaha	7	10	5	4	2	5	6	4	6	6	2	133
3	(United Kingdom) Triumph	22	18	9	9	11		12	14	12	8	12	41
4	(Japan) Honda	19	16	20		7		9	6				26
5	(Italy) Ducati	16	11	22							11	10	16
Pos	Constructor	(São Paulo (state)) SPO	(São Paulo (state)) PET	(São Paulo (state)) ELF	(São Paulo (state)) YAM	(Paraná (state)) CTB	(Goiás) GOI	(Goiás) ESM	(Goiás) GNA	(Paraná (state)) PAR	(São Paulo (state)) SUH	(São Paulo (state)) INT	Pts

=== Supersport Escola 600 ===
Icono	Categoría
SSP	Supersport

Pos.	Rider	Moto	Class	(São Paulo (state)) SPO	(São Paulo (state)) PET	(São Paulo (state)) ELF	(São Paulo (state)) YAM	(Paraná (state)) CTB	(Goiás) GOI	(Goiás) ESM	(Goiás) GNA	(Paraná (state)) PAR	(São Paulo (state)) SUH	(São Paulo (state)) INT	Pts
1	(Brazil) Vítor Simões	Yamaha	SSP	5	2	2	1	3	3	2	1	1	1	2	223
2	(Brazil) Raphael Motta	Triumph	SSP						1	1	3	2	3	1	127
3	(Brazil) Rodrigo César "Batata"	Kawasaki	SSP	8	3	5	3	Ret	12	13	9	Ret	2	3	101
4	(Brazil) Alex Penholato	Kawasaki	SSP	1	1	4			4	8	10	9			97
5	(Brazil) Alexandre Livino	Kawasaki	SSP				4		2	7	7	5	4	5	86
6	(Brazil) Gustavo Turner	Yamaha	SSP	15		14		2	6	3	2	3	Ret	DNS	85
7	(Brazil) Raphael Santos	Triumph	SSP	2	Ret	1	2	Ret	Wth	10	6				81
8	(Brazil) José Antônio N. Baceiredo	Kawasaki	SSP				6	5	8	4	8	7			59
9	(Brazil) Danilo Nicolas "Nico"	Ducati	SSP	14		Ret		1					5	4	51
10	(Brazil) Augusto de Oliveira	Yamaha	SSP							6	4	DNS	6	7	42
11	(Brazil) Walyson Trautenmuller	Kawasaki	SSP	6	5	7	Ret	DSQ	11	12	DNQ				39
12	(Brazil) William Silva	Kawasaki	SSP	7	4	6									32
13	(Brazil) Givanildo Santos	Kawasaki	SSP	17	13	19	5	NC	Ret	11	5	INF			30
14	(Brazil) Fernando Martins	Yamaha	SSP	3	6										26
15	(Brazil) Ivan Severino da Silva	Kawasaki	SSP	9	7	12									20
16	(Brazil) Luiz Imparato	Kawasaki	SSP			10			5	DSQ	DSQ	8	DNS	DNS	19
17	(Brazil) Gérson Caleb	Kawasaki	SSP										8	6	18
18	(Brazil) Jackson "Baianinho"	Yamaha	SSP										7	8	17
19	(Brazil) Paulo Foroni	Triumph	SSP		8	9									17
20	(Brazil) Tiago Franzim	Kawasaki	SSP			3									16
21	(Brazil) Mario Paulo	Kawasaki	SSP						7	9	DNS				16
22	(Brazil) Walter Becker	Triumph	SSP			17			9				9	Ret	14
23	(Brazil) Breno Florian	MV Agusta	SSP	4											13
24	(Brazil) Marcelo Demasi	Yamaha	SSP					4							13
25	(Brazil) Felipe C. Alencar	Triumph	SSP									4			13
26	(Brazil) Luã Gabriel	Yamaha	SSP							5	Ret				11
27	(Brazil) Rhoan Caio Lima "Caveirinha"	Yamaha	SSP				DNS					6			10
28	(Brazil) Henrique Ferro	Kawasaki	SSP	12	11										9
29	(Brazil) Rodrigo Gonçalvez	Kawasaki	SSP			8									8
30	(Brazil) Rodolfo Ferreira Filho	Yamaha	SSP		9										7
31	(Brazil) Vinícius Dagano Monteiro	Ducati	SSP	13	12										7
32	(Brazil) Rafael Gustavo	Triumph	SSP										10	Ret	6
33	(Brazil) Rafael Monteiro	Honda	SSP		10										6
34	(Brazil) Tirshen Mourão	Honda	SSP	10											6
35	(Brazil) Alex Baptista	Kawasaki	SSP	11											5
36	(Brazil) Gustavo Levy	Triumph	SSP			11									5
37	(Brazil) Felipe G. Rossi	Kawasaki	SSP			13									3
38	(Brazil) Vinícius Ramos	MV Agusta	SSP	Ret	14										2
39	(Brazil) Diego Fernandes	Honda	SSP			15									1
40	(Brazil) Rodrigo Jorge "Digão"	Honda	SSP	16											0
41	(Brazil) Rodolfo Mazoni	Suzuki	SSP			16									0
42	(Brazil) Cláudio H. Araújo	Honda	SSP			18									0
43	(Brazil) Marcos Paz	Triumph	SSP	Ret											0
44	(Brazil) Charles Edward	Triumph	SSP			Ret									0
45	(Brazil) Rafa Sanazar	Kawasaki	SSP		DNS										0
46	(Brazil) Célio da Silva	Yamaha	SSP						DNS						0
Pos	Piloto	Moto	Clase	(São Paulo (state)) SPO	(São Paulo (state)) PET	(São Paulo (state)) ELF	(São Paulo (state)) YAM	(Paraná (state)) CTB	(Goiás) GOI	(Goiás) ESM	(Goiás) GNA	(Paraná (state)) PAR	(São Paulo (state)) SUH	(São Paulo (state)) INT	Pts

Colour	Result
Gold	Winner
Silver	Second place
Bronze	Third place
Green	Points classification
Blue	Non-points classification
Blue	Non-classified finish (NC)
Purple	Retired, not classified (Ret)
Red	Did not qualify (DNQ)
Red	Did not pre-qualify (DNPQ)
Black	Disqualified (DSQ)
White	Did not start (DNS)
White	Withdrew (WD)
White	Race cancelled (C)
Blank	Did not practice (DNP)
Blank	Did not arrive (DNA)
Blank	Excluded (EX)

=== Constructors' standings ===
Pos	Constructor	(São Paulo (state)) SPO	(São Paulo (state)) PET	(São Paulo (state)) ELF	(São Paulo (state)) YAM	(Paraná (state)) CTB	(Goiás) GOI	(Goiás) ESM	(Goiás) GNA	(Paraná (state)) PAR	(São Paulo (state)) SUH	(São Paulo (state)) INT	Pts
1	(Japan) Yamaha	3	2	2	1	3	3	2	1	1	1	2	228
2	(United Kingdom) Triumph	2	8	1	2	Ret	1	1	3	2	3	1	200
3	(Japan) Kawasaki	1	1	3	3	5	2	4	7	5	2	3	182
4	(Italy) Ducati	14	12	Ret		1					5	4	55
5	(Japan) Honda	10	10	15									23
6	(Italy) MV Agusta	4	14										15
7	(Japan) Suzuki			16									0
Pos	Constructor	(São Paulo (state)) SPO	(São Paulo (state)) PET	(São Paulo (state)) ELF	(São Paulo (state)) YAM	(Paraná (state)) CTB	(Goiás) GOI	(Goiás) ESM	(Goiás) GNA	(Paraná (state)) PAR	(São Paulo (state)) SUH	(São Paulo (state)) INT	Pts

=== Copa Honda CBR 500R ===
Icono	Categoría
PRO	PRO
LGT	Light
TEE	Teen
EXT	Extreme
P/T	PRO/Teen (Simultáneo)
L/T	Light/Teen (Simultáneo)

Pos.	Rider	Moto	Class	(São Paulo (state)) SPO	(São Paulo (state)) PET	(São Paulo (state)) ELF	(São Paulo (state)) YAM	(Paraná (state)) CTB	(Goiás) GOI	(Goiás) ESM	(Goiás) GNA	(Paraná (state)) PAR	(São Paulo (state)) SUH	(São Paulo (state)) INT	Pts
1	(Brazil) Raphael K. Ramos	Honda	P/T	2	1	2	1	3	3	3	1	1	1	1	238
2	(Brazil) Fábio Florian	Honda	TEE	1	3	1	3	4	2	2	5	2	2	2	206
3	(Brazil) Christian Cerciari	Honda	PRO	7	5	3	Ret	2	1	1	4	6	Ret	DNS	129
4	(Brazil) Luiz Henrique "Luizinho"	Honda	LGT	8	6	Ret	4	1	Ret	4	2	10	4	3	124
5	(Brazil) Mário Nicoli	Honda	L/T	9	2		2	Ret	4	5	6	4	5	Wth	105
6	(Brazil) Renan Fui	Honda	PRO	6	8	5	6	8	5			3	3	5	101
7	(Brazil) Gilberto Jr	Honda	EXT	11	9	6		6	7	6	3	Ret	6	4	90
8	(Brazil) Maurício Laranjeira	Honda	EXT	Ret	14	12	11	5	8	10	8	8	12	14	58
9	(Brazil) Eduardo Domingues	Honda	LGT	19	13	7	Ret	12		9	9	7	7	7	57
10	(Brazil) Dênis Peppe	Honda	EXT	14	17	11	7	13	Ret	7	7	11	11	10	53
11	(Brazil) Richard Oliveira	Honda	L/T	22	Ret	17	9	10	9	8	10	14	9	8	43
12	(Brazil) Michael Valtingojer	Honda	EXT	10	Ret	16	14	15	11	13	12	5	13	11	40
13	(Brazil) Luiz Felipe	Honda	LGT	4	4	4									39
14	(Brazil) Gabrielly Lewis	Honda	TEE	Ret	15	Ret	5	9	6	15	11	NC	15	13	39
15	(Brazil) Alexandre Colorado	Honda	EXT	12	11	13	8	14		11	13	12	14	DSQ	36
16	(Brazil) Rodrigo Medeiros	Honda	LGT	16	12	14	10	7	DSQ				10	12	31
17	(Brazil) Isaque Teixeira	Honda	EXT	18	16	15	12	16	10	12	Ret	9	16	Ret	22
18	(Brazil) Ronaldo Guimarães	Honda	LGT	20		20	13	17	Ret				8	6	21
19	(Brazil) Juninho Moreira	Honda	PRO	5	7	DNS									20
20	(Brazil) Marcelo Moreno "MM"	Honda	EXT	3											16
21	(Brazil) Fábio Puccini	Honda	LGT	13	10	9									16
22	(Brazil) Mafe Rocha	Honda	TEE			8		11	DSQ						13
23	(Brazil) Anderson Felipe	Honda	EXT	23	18	19	15	19	13	14	Ret	15	17	Ret	7
24	(Brazil) Kléber Santos	Honda	EXT			10									6
25	(Brazil) Michael Alexandre "Tanga"	Honda	LGT	21	Ret			18	12						4
26	(Brazil) Heridelto L. Ribeiro	Honda	LGT									13			3
27	(Brazil) Rafael Sestenari	Honda	LGT	15	Ret										1
28	(Brazil) Guilherme de Brito	Honda	L/T	17	NC										0
29	(Brazil) Carlos Eduardo Trigo	Honda	EXT			18									0
30	(Brazil) Eduardo Monteiro	Honda	LGT							Ret	DNS	DNQ			0
31	(Brazil) Adriano Machado	Honda	LGT										Ret	DNS	0
32	(Brazil) Rafael Touche	Honda	EXT			Ret									0
33	(Brazil) Magno "Menino de Ouro"	Honda	EXT	DNS											0
34	(Brazil) Ademílson Peixer	Honda	PRO					AT							0
Pos	Piloto	Moto	Clase	(São Paulo (state)) SPO	(São Paulo (state)) PET	(São Paulo (state)) ELF	(São Paulo (state)) YAM	(Paraná (state)) CTB	(Goiás) GOI	(Goiás) ESM	(Goiás) GNA	(Paraná (state)) PAR	(São Paulo (state)) SUH	(São Paulo (state)) INT	Pts

Colour	Result
Gold	Winner
Silver	Second place
Bronze	Third place
Green	Points classification
Blue	Non-points classification
Blue	Non-classified finish (NC)
Purple	Retired, not classified (Ret)
Red	Did not qualify (DNQ)
Red	Did not pre-qualify (DNPQ)
Black	Disqualified (DSQ)
White	Did not start (DNS)
White	Withdrew (WD)
White	Race cancelled (C)
Blank	Did not practice (DNP)
Blank	Did not arrive (DNA)
Blank	Excluded (EX)

=== Yamaha Yamalube R3 Cup ===
Icono	Categoría
MAS	R3 Master
R3	R3 Cup
STK	Stock

Pos.	Rider	Moto	Class	(São Paulo (state)) SPO	(São Paulo (state)) PET	(São Paulo (state)) ELF	(São Paulo (state)) YAM	(Paraná (state)) CTB	(Goiás) GOI	(Goiás) ESM	(Goiás) GNA	(Paraná (state)) PAR	(São Paulo (state)) SUH	(São Paulo (state)) INT	Pts
1	(Brazil) Guilherme Brito	Yamaha	R3	1	13	1	2	4	2	9	2	22	8	4	154
2	(Brazil) Humberto Maier "Turquinho Jr"	Yamaha	STK	3	27	5		12	9	2	1	8	3	2	127
3	(Argentina) Emiliano Lancion	Yamaha	R3	9	1	4	1	17	4	1	3	23	Ret	DNS	124
4	(Brazil) Enzo Valentim Garcia	Yamaha	R3	2	Ret	2	3	30	7	4	4	Ret	4	9	111
5	(Brazil) Lincoln Melo	Yamaha	R3	10	17	6	4	2	10	6	5	2	10	10	108
6	(Brazil) Kaywan Freire	Yamaha	STK	7	19	7		Ret	3	8	13	13	1	3	89
7	(Spain) Yeray Ruiz	Yamaha	R3				8	3	11	3	9	10	5	8	77
8	(Brazil) Felipe Macan	Yamaha	STK	8	Ret	9		14	6	10	14	4	6	6	68
9	(Brazil) João Vítor Carneiro	Yamaha	R3	28	30	14	5	Ret	13	7	8	5	2	Ret	64
10	(Brazil) Ton Kawakami	Yamaha	R3									1	Ret	1	50
11	(Brazil) Gustavo Manso	Yamaha	STK	14	21	17		7	5	14	Ret	7	11	12	42
12	(Uruguay) Facundo Llambias	Yamaha	R3	17	3	Ret		Ret	1	Ret	20	Ret			41
13	(Brazil) Leandro Bagnarelli	Yamaha	R3	6	28	11		1							40
14	(Brazil) Leopoldo Manella	Yamaha	STK	20	4	12		9	15	12	15	9	15	14	40
15	(Brazil) Kevin Fontainha	Yamaha	R3	16	20	20		6	8	5	7	24			38
16	(Brazil) Lucas Torres	Yamaha	R3	21	2	8	7								37
17	(Brazil) Bruno César Borges	Yamaha	R3	4	29	10	6	8	Ret	DSQ	DSQ				37
18	(Brazil) Alex Milan	Yamaha	R3	5	16	3		Ret					9	Ret	34
19	(Brazil) Fabinho Jandaia	Yamaha	MAS	12		13	10	25	19	16	6	16	Ret	5	34
20	(Brazil) Rafael Fernandes	Yamaha	STK	31	6	22		13	12	13	17	6	Ret	20	30
21	(Brazil) Rafael Rigueiro	Yamaha	R3	13	9	18	11	26				11	12	13	27
22	(Brazil) João Pires Arratia	Yamaha	STK	18	5	DNS		18	16	11	10	17	14	15	25
23	(Brazil) Théo Manna	Yamaha	R3	23	14	38	Ret	Ret	29	Ret	12	3	19	17	22
24	(Brazil) Bruno Ribeiro	Yamaha	R3	19	18	21	9	5	20	17	16		Ret	16	18
25	(Brazil) Enzo Maccapani	Yamaha	R3	33	10	24	15	10	Ret			25	13	21	16
26	(Brazil) Eduardo Burr	Yamaha	R3	24	7	16		Ret	18	15	11	DNS	18	18	15
27	(Brazil) Felipe Gonçalves	Yamaha	R3	15				DNS	Ret				7	11	15
28	(Brazil) Mário Salles	Yamaha	STK	30	8	19		15	17	18	18	14	16	Ret	11
29	(Brazil) Meikon Kawakami	Yamaha	R3										Ret	7	9
30	(Brazil) Rodrigo Gregório "Diguinho"	Yamaha	STK	11	Ret			DNS	14	21	21				7
31	(Brazil) Marcelo Martins	Yamaha	R3	32	24	27	18	11	DNS	24	DNS	Ret			5
32	(Brazil) Sylvio Neto	Yamaha	MAS	41	11	34		23	DSQ	26	INF	Ret	27	25	5
33	(Brazil) Pierre Bauducci	Yamaha	MAS	36		Ret	22	31	28			12	21	22	4
34	(Brazil) Gustavo Sarcinella	Yamaha	R3	Ret	12	36									4
35	(Brazil) Sarah Conessa	Yamaha	R3	DNS		28	12	22	DNS	20	19	18	23	24	4
36	(Brazil) Lucas Cottet	Yamaha	R3	35	23	26	13								3
37	(Brazil) Fernando Santos	Yamaha	MAS	29	22	25	14								2
38	(Brazil) José Roberto Rangel	Yamaha	MAS	37	25	Ret		20		25	Ret	15	Ret	DNS	1
39	(Brazil) Odair Delafrati	Yamaha	MAS	26		15		Wth				21			1
40	(Brazil) Rafael Traldi	Yamaha	R3		15										1
41	(Brazil) Roberney Favoretto	Yamaha	MAS				16								0
42	(Brazil) Antônio Enrique	Yamaha	MAS					16							0
43	(Brazil) Rubens Mesquita	Yamaha	STK	27		Ret		19	21	19	Ret	20	17	19	0
44	(Brazil) Lucas Minato	Yamaha	R3		Ret	23	17	29				DNS			0
45	(Brazil) Édson "Edinho Picoloko"	Yamaha	R3	39	Ret	35	21	28	27	28	Ret	19	26	26	0
46	(Brazil) Alen Filho	Yamaha	R3				19	NC		Ret	DNS				0
47	(Brazil) Luiz Henrique Tavares	Yamaha	MAS		32	32	20		25	27	NC	Ret	28	27	0
48	(Brazil) Marcelo Simões	Yamaha	R3										20	Ret	0
49	(Brazil) Rique E. F. da Silva	Yamaha	R3					21							0
50	(Brazil) Davi Gama	Yamaha	R3	34	33				22	22	22				0
51	(Brazil) Ruan Burdino	Yamaha	MAS										22	Ret	0
52	(Brazil) Alzhan Barrossi	Yamaha	R3	22											0
53	(Brazil) Rafael Macedo	Yamaha	MAS	38	26	31		24	DSQ			DSQ	25	23	0
54	(Brazil) João Vitor Silva "João Bala"	Yamaha	R3	40						23	Ret				0
55	(Brazil) Fábio Delafrati	Yamaha	MAS					Ret	23						0
56	(Brazil) Gabriel "Biel Garcia"	Yamaha	R3										24	29	0
57	(Brazil) Clementino Santos "Tino Bala"	Yamaha	MAS						24						0
58	(Brazil) Alex Schultz	Yamaha	MAS	25											0
59	(Brazil) João Fascinelli	Yamaha	R3						26						0
60	(Brazil) Marcos Alípio V. Viana	Yamaha	MAS					27							0
61	(Brazil) Iures Delfino	Yamaha	MAS										29	28	0
62	(Brazil) Ana Lima	Yamaha	MAS			29									0
63	(Brazil) Leandro L. Oliveira	Yamaha	MAS			30									0
64	(Brazil) Leandro Lionese	Yamaha	MAS	Ret	31	Ret									0
65	(Brazil) Saulo Filho	Yamaha	R3			33									0
66	(Brazil) Pedro Henrique Ramos	Yamaha	R3	Ret	Ret	37	Ret								0
67	(Brazil) Deyvid Sousa	Yamaha	MAS	42											0
68	(Brazil) Gustavo Lima	Yamaha	R3									Ret	Ret	INF	0
69	(Brazil) Marciano Santin	Yamaha	MAS	Ret											0
70	(Brazil) Marcos Kawasaki	Yamaha	MAS	Ret											0
71	(Brazil) Gustavo Turner	Yamaha	MAS		Ret										0
72	(Brazil) Wellington Reis	Yamaha	R3									Ret			0
Pos	Piloto	Moto	Clase	(São Paulo (state)) SPO	(São Paulo (state)) PET	(São Paulo (state)) ELF	(São Paulo (state)) YAM	(Paraná (state)) CTB	(Goiás) GOI	(Goiás) ESM	(Goiás) GNA	(Paraná (state)) PAR	(São Paulo (state)) SUH	(São Paulo (state)) INT	Pts

Colour	Result
Gold	Winner
Silver	Second place
Bronze	Third place
Green	Points classification
Blue	Non-points classification
Blue	Non-classified finish (NC)
Purple	Retired, not classified (Ret)
Red	Did not qualify (DNQ)
Red	Did not pre-qualify (DNPQ)
Black	Disqualified (DSQ)
White	Did not start (DNS)
White	Withdrew (WD)
White	Race cancelled (C)
Blank	Did not practice (DNP)
Blank	Did not arrive (DNA)
Blank	Excluded (EX)

=== Honda Junior Cup ===
Icono	Categoría
CUP	Honda Junior Cup

Pos.	Rider	Moto	Class	(São Paulo (state)) SPO	(São Paulo (state)) PET	(São Paulo (state)) ELF	(São Paulo (state)) YAM	(Paraná (state)) CTB	(Goiás) GOI	(Goiás) ESM	(Goiás) GNA	(Paraná (state)) PAR	(São Paulo (state)) SUH	(São Paulo (state)) INT	Pts
1	(Brazil) João Teixeira	Honda	CUP	3	1	1	4	1	1	3	6	1	2	1	199
2	(Brazil) Pedro Balla	Honda	CUP	1	10	2	1	3	2	1	2	7	1	Ret	150
3	(Brazil) Brayann dos Santos Silva "Ligeirinho"	Honda	CUP	4	Ret	3	2	2	3	6	3	6	3	3	122
4	(Brazil) João Henrique Fascineli	Honda	CUP	2	Ret	5	3	10	6	5	5	5	NC	7	94
5	(Brazil) Matheus Oliveira	Honda	CUP	5	4	4	Ret	Ret	4	Ret	1	2	5	4	83
6	(Brazil) Raul Mattos Cerciari	Honda	CUP		2	6		7	7	7	7		6	5	68
7	(Brazil) Cauã Buzzo	Honda	CUP	9		9	6	9	10	10	Ret	3	Ret	10	65
8	(Brazil) Giovanna Brasil	Honda	CUP	7	3	7		5	13	13	8		7	6	61
9	(Brazil) Rafael Oliveira	Honda	CUP		9	12	8	4	9	11	Ret	9	8	11	56
10	(Brazil) Cauã Rodrigues	Honda	CUP	11	8	14		6	8	4	9	10	Ret	13	55
11	(Brazil) Matheus Machado Lima	Honda	CUP	Ret	6	11	7		Ret	14	DSQ	4	9	9	46
12	(Brazil) Saulinho Jales Filho	Honda	CUP							2	4		4	2	40
13	(Brazil) Miguel Henrique	Honda	CUP	8	DNS	Ret	11	8	12	8	10	Ret	11	12	40
14	(Brazil) Leonardo Henry	Honda	CUP		5	8				9	11	Ret	10	8	38
15	(Brazil) Allan Chacon	Honda	CUP	10	7	10	9		11				12	DNS	33
16	(Brazil) Letícia Vivolo	Honda	CUP	12	11	15	12	11	14	12	INF	11	14	16	30
17	(Brazil) Kauã P. Leão	Honda	CUP				5		5						22
18	(Brazil) Rafael Lima Ramos	Honda	CUP			13	10					8	13	14	19
19	(Brazil) Érik Vivolo	Honda	CUP	6											10
20	(Brazil) Tarso da Silva	Honda	CUP		12										5
21	(Brazil) Enzo Verdeli	Honda	CUP										DNQ	15	1
22	(Brazil) Carlos Konopka	Honda	CUP			DNS									0
Pos	Piloto	Moto	Clase	(São Paulo (state)) SPO	(São Paulo (state)) PET	(São Paulo (state)) ELF	(São Paulo (state)) YAM	(Paraná (state)) CTB	(Goiás) GOI	(Goiás) ESM	(Goiás) GNA	(Paraná (state)) PAR	(São Paulo (state)) SUH	(São Paulo (state)) INT	Pts

Colour	Result
Gold	Winner
Silver	Second place
Bronze	Third place
Green	Points classification
Blue	Non-points classification
Blue	Non-classified finish (NC)
Purple	Retired, not classified (Ret)
Red	Did not qualify (DNQ)
Red	Did not pre-qualify (DNPQ)
Black	Disqualified (DSQ)
White	Did not start (DNS)
White	Withdrew (WD)
White	Race cancelled (C)
Blank	Did not practice (DNP)
Blank	Did not arrive (DNA)
Blank	Excluded (EX)

=== Scoring system ===
Points are awarded to the top fifteen finishers of the main race and to the top nine of the sprint. A rider has to finish the race to earn points.

Position	1°	2°	3°	4°	5°	6°	7°	8°	9°	10°	11°	12°	13°	14°	15°
Race	25	20	16	13	11	10	9	8	7	6	5	4	3	2	1

== Champions of all categories ==
=== Overview ===
#	Class	Champion	Team	Construtor	Moto	Ref
PRO	Superbike PRO	(Brazil) Eric Granado	(Brazil) Honda Racing Brasil	(Japan) Honda	Honda CBR 1000RR	
EXT	Superbike Extreme	(Brazil) Rodrigo Dazzi	(Brazil) ELLO Racing	(Germany) BMW	BMW S1000RR	
LGT	Superbike Light	(Brazil) Victor Villaverde	(Germany) BMW Motorrad MotorSport	(Germany) BMW	BMW S1000RR	
MAS	Superbike Light Master	(Brazil) Nélson Gonçalves "Mágico"	(Brazil) Red Ant Racing	(Japan) Suzuki	Suzuki GSX-R 1000	
EVO	Superbike Light EVO	(Brazil) Bruno Corano	(Germany) BMW Motorrad MotorSport	(Germany) BMW	BMW S1000RR	
1000	Superbike Light EVO 1000	(Brazil) Márcio Bortolini	(Brazil) Sulina Racing	(Germany) BMW	BMW S1000RR	
EVM	Superbike Light EVO Master	(Brazil) Cristiano Nogueira	(Brazil) Trust Motor	(Japan) Kawasaki	Kawasaki Ninja ZX-10R	
STK	Superstock	(Brazil) Guto Figueiredo	(Brazil) PSBK Racing	(Japan) Kawasaki	Kawasaki Ninja ZX-10R	
SBK	Superbike Escola 1000	(Brazil) Rafael Palmieri "Rizada"	(Brazil) PSBK Racing	(Germany) BMW	BMW S1000RR	
PRO	Supersport 600 PRO	(Brazil) Matheus Barbosa	(Japan) Kawasaki Racing Team	(Japan) Kawasaki	Kawasaki Ninja ZX-6R	
EXT	Supersport 600 Extreme	(Paraguay) Pedro Fidélis Valiente	(Paraguay) Valiente Racing	(Japan) Yamaha	Yamaha YZF-R6	
MAS	Supersport 600 Master	(Brazil) Rubens Luís Arenas Bosch	(Spain) Barry Racing	(Japan) Kawasaki	Kawasaki Ninja ZX-6R	
STK	Supersport 600 Stock	(Brazil) Maurício Marques	(Brazil) Celani Team	(Japan) Kawasaki	Kawasaki Ninja ZX-6R	
SSP	Supersport Escola 600	(Brazil) Vítor Simões	(Brazil) SPN Racing - 598	(Japan) Yamaha	Yamaha YZF-R6	
PRO	Copa Honda CBR 500R PRO	(Brazil) Raphael K. Ramos	(Brazil) MotoSchool Racing Team	(Japan) Honda	Honda CBR 500R	
LGT	Copa Honda CBR 500R Light	(Brazil) Luiz Henrique "Luizinho"	(Brazil) Tecfil Havoline Racing	(Japan) Honda	Honda CBR 500R	
TEE	Copa Honda CBR 500R Teen	(Brazil) Raphael K. Ramos	(Brazil) MotoSchool Racing Team	(Japan) Honda	Honda CBR 500R	
EXT	Copa Honda CBR 500R Extreme	(Brazil) Gilberto Jr	(Brazil) Tecfil Havoline Racing	(Japan) Honda	Honda CBR 500R	
MAS	Yamaha Yamalube R3 Master	(Brazil) Fabinho Jandaia	(Brazil) Team Carat	(Japan) Yamaha	Yamaha YZF-R3	
R3	Yamaha Yamalube R3 Cup	(Brazil) Guilherme Brito	(Brazil) Pitico Race Team/Nacar Yamaha	(Japan) Yamaha	Yamaha YZF-R3	
STK	Yamaha Yamalube Stock	(Brazil) Humberto Maier "Turquinho Jr"	(Brazil) Yamalub Racing	(Japan) Yamaha	Yamaha YZF-R3	
CUP	Honda Junior Cup	(Brazil) João Teixeira	(Brazil) Certainty Racing	(Japan) Honda	Honda CG 160 Titan	

== See also ==
- SuperBike Brasil
- Moto 1000 GP
- Superbike World Championship
- Outline of motorcycles and motorcycling
- British Superbike Championship
- MotoAmerica
- AMA Superbike Championship
- All Japan Road Race Championship
- Australian Superbike Championship
- Grand Prix motorcycle racing
