= Hardwick Racing =

Hardwick Racing was a grand-prix motorcycle racing team founded by Australian businessman Jeff Hardwick. The team ran in the world championship with Shell-sponsored Honda motorcycles from 1998 to 2001 and became the first Australian-owned and managed team in the premier class of road racing.

== History ==
Jeff Hardwick started his long relationship with Honda in 1972, when he bought a motorcycle dealership on the Gold Coast, Queensland. Within few years the business expanded to many shops and dealerships.

In 1985, Hardwick approached Shell to market its motorcycle oils in Australia. Around that time Hardwick and Shell began backing a number of bikes in major local road racing events such as Bathurst and the Castrol 6-Hours, providing a national platform for riders like Mick Doohan, Mat Mladin, Troy Bayliss and Andrew Pitt.

In 1998 Hardwick Racing entered a team in the 500cc world championship establishing a workshop in Belgium. Garry McCoy and Juan Borja were the two riders, aboard Shell-backed Honda NSR500Vs. McCoy was the leading rookie until a crash at Brno ended his season prematurely.

The following year Hardwick joined forces with Mick Doohan to enter a team in the 250cc world championship with Tohru Ukawa riding a works Honda NSR250, and Anthony West on a TSR-Honda 250. Ukawa won the French and Valencian grands prix, finishing the season in second place behind the young Valentino Rossi.

In 2000 the Hardwick team continued in the 250cc world championship with Ukawa and West. The Japanese rider won two races and finished fourth in the championship.

The team moved back to the premier 500cc class in 2001 with Chris Walker aboard a Honda NSR500 and Leon Haslam riding a Honda NSR500V. During the season Hardwick signed Katja Poensgen to ride the last races with a Honda in the 250cc class.

For 2002 Hardwick planned a four-riders team, signing Poensgen and Alex Debon for the 250cc class, while Haslam and Tetsuya Harada would have contested the 500cc class. However at the end of 2001 Shell ceased their sponsorship deal with Hardwick Racing and the team fell in financial difficulties. The 250cc program was discarded, leaving Poensgen and Debon without a team, while the 500cc program and Harada were taken over by Pramac Racing. Jeff Hardwick became the first Pramac team manager, but then he retired from racing and returned to Australia to establish the Hardwick Racing Products emporium.

Jeff Hardwick died in 2011 at the age of 66.
