= Anthony West (motorcyclist) =

Australian motorcycle racer (born 1981)

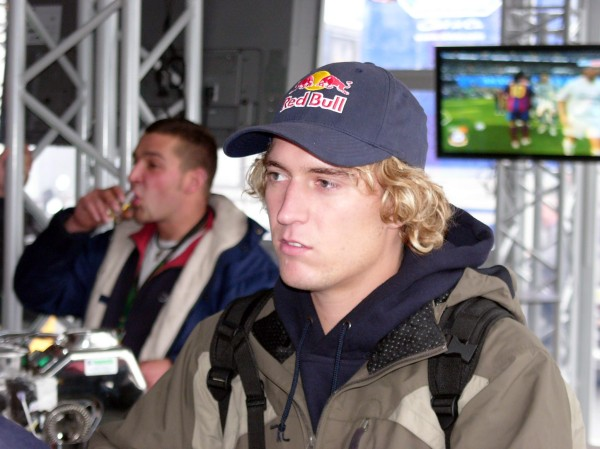
- West in 2005
- Nationality: Australian
- Born: 17 July 1981 (age 45); Maryborough, Queensland, Australia
- Current team: EAB antwest Racing & Webike IKAZUCHI Racing
- Bike number: 13
- Website: Official Webpage
Motorcycle racing career statistics
MotoGP World Championship
Active years	2007–2008, 2015
Manufacturers	Kawasaki, Honda
Championships	0
2015 championship position	NC (0 pts)
Starts / Wins / Podiums / Poles / F. laps / Points; 32 / 0 / 0 / 0 / 0 / 109
Moto2 World Championship
Active years	2010–2016
Manufacturers	MZ-RE Honda, Moriwaki, Speed Up, Suter
Championships	0
2016 championship position	27th (6 pts)
Starts / Wins / Podiums / Poles / F. laps / Points; 99 / 1 / 1 / 0 / 0 / 193
500cc World Championship
Active years	2001
Manufacturers	Honda
Championships	0
2001 championship position	18th (27 pts)
Starts / Wins / Podiums / Poles / F. laps / Points; 14 / 0 / 0 / 0 / 0 / 27
250cc World Championship
Active years	1999–2000, 2003–2007
Manufacturers	Honda, Aprilia, KTM
Championships	0
2007 championship position	19th (25 pts)
Starts / Wins / Podiums / Poles / F. laps / Points; 92 / 1 / 5 / 0 / 1 / 578
125cc World Championship
Active years	1998
Manufacturers	Honda
Championships	0
1998 championship position	NC (0 pts)
Starts / Wins / Podiums / Poles / F. laps / Points; 1 / 0 / 0 / 0 / 0 / 0
Superbike World Championship
Active years	2016–2017
Manufacturers	Kawasaki
Championships	0
2017 championship position	27th (13 pts)
Starts / Wins / Podiums / Poles / F. laps / Points; 16 / 0 / 0 / 0 / 0 / 77
Supersport World Championship
Active years	2004, 2007, 2009, 2016–2018
Manufacturers	Honda, Yamaha, Kawasaki
Championships	0
2018 championship position	10th (51 pts)
Starts / Wins / Podiums / Poles / F. laps / Points; 33 / 2 / 9 / 0 / 2 / 330

Anthony Keith West, (born 17 July 1981 in Maryborough, Queensland), is an Australian motorcycle road racer. He most recently raced in the 2019 Brazilian Superbike Championship for the Kawasaki Racing Team. West was suspended from participating at any FIM sanctioned events for 24 months due to testing positive for banned substances from 8 July 2018 to 14 September 2020. In 2018, he competed in the Supersport World Championship, aboard a Kawasaki ZX-6R and in the Asia Road Race SS600 Championship, aboard a Yamaha YZF-R6.

During 2017, West raced in the Supersport World Championship (600 cc) and the Asia Road Race SS600 Championship initially aboard a Yamaha YZF-R6 followed by a Kawasaki ZX-6R, and also selected events in the Superbike World Championship on a Kawasaki ZX-10R as a stand-in rider for Puccetti Kawasaki.

West has won two races in Grands Prix, the 2003 Dutch TT in the 250 cc class, and the 2014 Dutch TT in the Moto2 class. He is known as "The Rain Man" because of his ability to ride well in the extreme wet, which he attributes to a dirt track racing background. As of 2024, he raced in the Australian Superbike Championship.

== Career ==
=== 500cc World Championship ===
In 2001, West was a 500cc rider for the Dee Cee Jeans Racing Team, scoring minor points in 12 of the 16 races to place 18th overall.

In 2002, West had a year away from motorcycling as he could not gather enough sponsorship to secure a factory Aprilia ride.

=== Return to 250cc ===
In the 2003 and 2004 seasons, West rode for the Italian Abruzzo Racing team, running a privateer Aprilia both years. 2003 was the more successful of the years, he won a race and achieved three additional podium places.

2005 was supposed to be West's big break, but a factory deal with KTM saw him miss three quarters of the season due to a lack of development and several mechanical failures. However, West rode the KTM to a podium place on debut, placing second in the rain soaked British Grand Prix at Donington Park.

Early in the 2007 season, West rode in the 250cc World Championship on a semi-factory, LE Aprilia run by Matteoni Racing. A disappointing start to the season saw West unable to match the times he set on the Kiefer Bos bike in 2006, with a best result of ninth after the fourth round of seventeen, leading him to quit the team.

However, West enjoyed more success when, at the Monza round of the 2007 World Supersport Championship, he rode through the field from 18th on the grid to finish 3rd, while substituting for injured compatriot Kevin Curtain on his first visit to the track, on his first race aboard the Yamaha. Then, in the following World Supersport round at the historic Silverstone circuit, West secured victory in a wet race. He repeated this feat again at Misano. He finished the championship in ninth place, despite only contesting three of the thirteen rounds.

=== Return to MotoGP ===
Following the retirement of Olivier Jacque in June 2007, West was offered the position to race with the Kawasaki Racing Team in MotoGP and aboard the Ninja ZX-RR for the remainder of the season, buying out his contract with Yamaha. He made a good debut at the British Grand Prix, reaching fourth position, but then crashing and eventually finishing 11th. His first four races each saw him finish progressively higher, with seventh at Mazda Raceway Laguna Seca and eighth at the Sachsenring. He was seventh again in the wet at Motegi, but could have been even higher. Starting sixth, he jumped the start fractionally – by the time the ride-through penalty was handed out, he was leading the race. Teammate Randy de Puniet came second amidst an all-Bridgestone podium, emphasising the missed opportunity. In his home country's Grand Prix the Australian's error caused him to only finish 12th while compatriot Casey Stoner won aboard his Ducati.

At the following race in Malaysia, Sepang, West qualified an impressive fifth behind teammate Randy de Puniet but was yet again given a ride through penalty, this time for lining up incorrectly on the starting grid. West climbed his way back through the field to 15th, capturing one championship point.

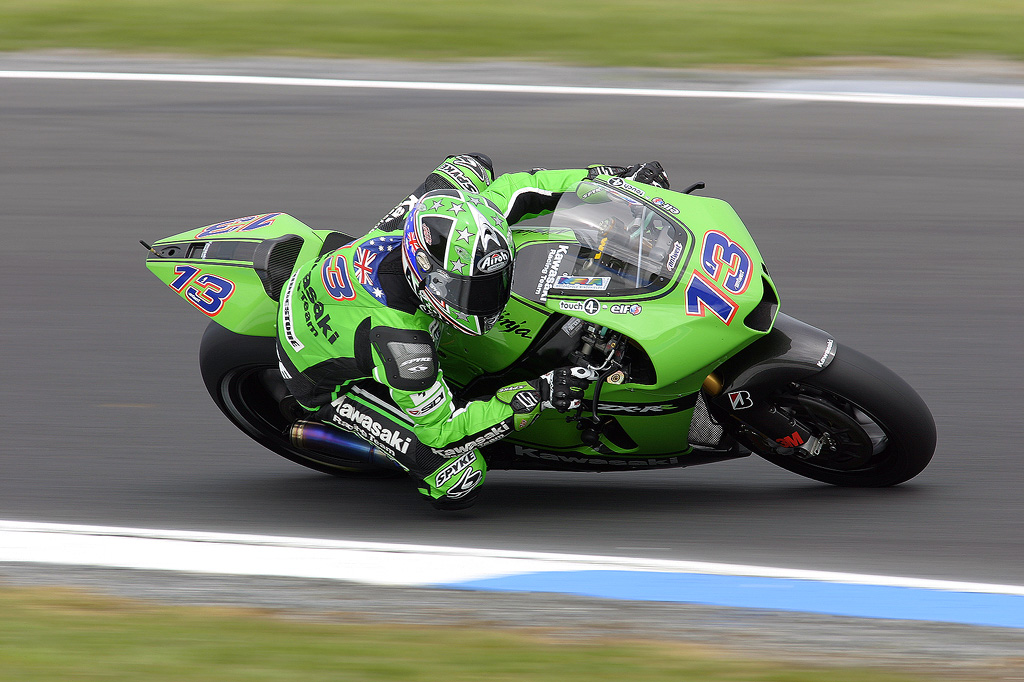
Anthony West riding a Kawasaki at the 2007 Australian MotoGP at Phillip Island

West remained with Kawasaki full-time for 2008, joined by John Hopkins. However, he did not achieve great success, and spent much of the season as the last of the 18 regular riders in the championship. There was improvement at Brno however; he qualified sixth in the wet and carried the form over into a dry race, finishing fifth in a race dominated by Bridgestone tyred bikes.

It had already been announced on the Saturday at Brno that West would not be riding for Kawasaki in the 2009 season. Kawasaki reportedly offered him a ride in another championship (which would likely be the Supersport World Championship, in which he competed briefly in 2007); West did not immediately reveal whether he had accepted or declined this offer.

Due to Kawasaki team manager Michael Bartholemy's stated desire to keep West in the Kawasaki family, West was rumoured to be an outside chance to ride a third Kawasaki in MotoGP, which would have been run by Jorge Martínez 'Aspar', who runs the Aspar 125cc and 250cc teams. However, West was never officially mentioned and it transpired that Martinez and his sponsors were only interested in hiring a Spanish rider, a factor that resulted in the team's entry to MotoGP being postponed until after 2009 when no suitable rider could be found.

On 16 October 2008, it was announced that West had signed to ride for the Stiggy Honda team for the 2009 World Supersport Championship, cutting his ties with Kawasaki.

=== Moto2 World Championship ===
For 2010, West raced in the new Moto2 class.

==== 2012 ====
For 2012, West was scheduled to ride for the Speed Master team in MotoGP with their CRT Spec Aprilia RSV-4, however he failed to raise the sponsorship necessary and the ride went to Mattia Pasini. West then signed with Supersonic Racing, riding the BMW S1000RR in the British Superbike Championship after narrowly missing out on a ride with Swan Yamaha.

Further drama was to come however, when West's fellow countryman Damian Cudlin was dropped from the QMMF Moto2 Team after struggling with the Moriwaki machine in pre-season testing. West quickly signed with the team, less than a week before the season opener in Qatar. He subsequently left the British Superbike Championship to race in Moto2 full-time.

From Mugello onwards, West raced the Speed Up chassis in place of the struggling Moriwaki. He achieved two season best results of second at Malaysia and his home Grand Prix in Phillip Island.

On 31 October, it was announced that a sample that West had provided for testing at the French Grand Prix contained traces of methylhexanamine, a banned substance. West was stripped of his seventh-place finish in the French Grand Prix and was banned from competing in any FIM-sanctioned race for one month.

==== 2013 ====
For 2013, West continued with the QMMF Moto2 Team alongside Indonesian rider Rafid Topan Sucipto who replaced West at Valencia following his ban. In November 2013 the Court of Arbitration for Sport ruled on an appeal by the World Anti-Doping Agency against the decision of the Fédération Internationale de Motocyclisme to only ban West for one month following his positive drug test in 2012. The court retrospectively increased the ban to 18 months and all his results between 20 May 2012 and 19 October 2013 were voided.

==== 2014 ====
In 2014, West remained again with QMMF Racing Team, this time partnered by Spanish rookie Roman Ramos. Both raced in the Italian Speed Up.

West started very well the season, finishing the first five races in points positions, with a best of seventh place at the American GP. While Ràmos always struggled with the Speed Up (he never scored points) West was always fighting for points and he was the best Speed Up rider in a field almost dominated by Kalexs.

At the Dutch TT, West qualified in a poor 23rd position out of 34 riders. But in a wet-drying race where most riders struggled, West once again showed his amazing wet ability and climbed up in first position, to win his second career world championship win, once again in the Dutch TT after his 2003 win. He was the first non-Kalex rider to win that year. Only two other non-Kalex riders won a race that year, both on a Suter. He climbed up to eighth position after that win.

West rarely scored points again after that Dutch win, and he finished in 12th position with 72 points. He scored three more points than rookie Sam Lowes, so he was the best Speed Up rider that season.

West was confirmed once again to ride with the QMMF team for the 2015 season.

==== 2015 ====
In 2015, West was partnered this time by a more competitive rider than the others, Spain's Julián Simón.

This time West's performance were not so good. He often struggled in qualifying and he always had to regain positions in the race, going to the limits and retiring more often than previous years.

Tensions with the team didn't help and when West was finally in the midpoints positions, he was sacked by the team after the San Marino GP. He was replaced by Mika Kallio.

West did not race the remaining five races and he finished the season in 22nd position, with 30 points. His best races were at Austin and a wet Silverstone, where he finished seventh in both occasions.

==== 2016 ====
West raced in World Supersport Championship in 2016 with a wildcard entry in his home race with team Tribeca Racing riding a Yamaha YZF-R6. He finished the race at third position. He also entered the Assen race with his self-sponsored team called West Racing, but he did not race.

West competed in World Superbike with Pedercini replacing Lucas Mahias. At Sepang, West finished the race in ninth in the first race and fifth in the second race in wet conditions. He raced for all but two races onwards, always finishing on points scoring positions, except in one race when he retired. He finished 17th in the standings with 64 points.

West made a wildcard appearance with Montaze Broz Racing in Moto2 aboard a Suter at the 2016 Czech Republic motorcycle Grand Prix, he started 28th on the grid and finished in tenth place on rain-affected conditions, one of the two riders who scored points in a Suter that year.

West finished sixth in the Asia Road Race SS600 Championship with three wins, the only rider able to do that.

=== Supersport & Superbike World Championship ===
==== 2017 ====
For 2017, West re-entered his private West Racing team in the Supersport World Championship. At Phillip Island, he finished once again in third position. He did not raced in Thailand and Aragon, though he entered the Spanish race. He finished in points scoring positions in every race he entered that year. At Assen, he finished 14th. At Imola, he finished 11th. At Donington Park, he managed a seventh place, at Misano, a tenth place, and at the Lausitzring, he finished eighth. West finished the season in eighth place with 83 points.

West also raced in the Monterey Peninsula round of the MotoAmerica SuperBike Championship, where he finished in fifth and eighth place, resulting in a total of 19 points and a current 17th place in the standings.

West entered four races in the World Superbike Championship for the Puccetti Kawasaki Racing team at the Portuguese and French rounds, replacing injured Randy Krummenacher. He scored 13 points with an eighth place in Race 2 at the Algarve's Portimao Circuit being his best result, before switching to the Puccetti Supersport 600 machine for the last two meetings of the year, due to Kenan Sofuoğlu's injuries and Kyle Ryde's termination by the team leaving machines available. The Puccetti Superbike was taken over by Sylvain Guintoli.

=== Return to racing ===
==== 2021 ====
For 2021, West returned to racing in the Australian Superbike Championship. He started racing in the second round of the season for Moto-Go Yamaha Team aboard a Yamaha YZF-R1. In his first race back, West finished eighth out of 20 riders while in the second, he finished in tenth place.

== Career statistics ==
=== Grand Prix motorcycle racing ===
==== By season ====
Season	Class	Motorcycle	Team	Race	Win	Podium	Pole	FLap	Pts	Plcd	WCh
1998	125cc	Honda RS125	Christopher West Plumbing	1	0	0	0	0	0	NC	–
1999	250cc	TSR-Honda	Shell Advance Honda Team	16	0	0	0	0	66	12th	–
2000	250cc	Honda NSR250	Shell Advance Honda Team	16	0	0	0	0	146	6th	–
2001	500cc	Honda NSR500	Dee Cee Jeans Racing Team	14	0	0	0	0	27	18th	–
2003	250cc	Aprilia RSV 250	Team Zoppini Abruzzo	16	1	4	0	0	145	7th	–
2004	250cc	Aprilia RSV 250	Freesoul Abruzzo Racing Team	14	0	0	0	0	88	11th	–
2005	250cc	Aprilia RSV 250	Aprilia Germany	1	0	0	0	0	30	17th	–
2005	250cc	Honda RS250R	Wurth Honda BQR	1	0	0	0	0	30	17th	–
2005	250cc	KTM 250 FRR	Red Bull KTM GP250	5	0	1	0	1	30	17th	–
2006	250cc	Aprilia RSV 250	Kiefer-Bos-Racing	16	0	0	0	0	78	11th	–
2007	250cc	Aprilia RSV 250	Team Sicilia	7	0	0	0	0	25	18th	–
2007	MotoGP	Kawasaki Ninja ZX-RR	Kawasaki Racing Team	11	0	0	0	0	59	15th	–
2008	MotoGP	Kawasaki Ninja ZX-RR	Kawasaki Racing Team	18	0	0	0	0	50	18th	–
2010	Moto2	MZ Moto2	MZ Racing Team	17	0	0	0	0	26	23rd	–
2011	Moto2	MZ Moto2	MZ Racing Team	17	0	0	0	0	40	22nd	–
2012	Moto2	Moriwaki MD600	QMMF Racing Team	16	0	0	0	0	0	NC	–
2012	Moto2	Speed Up S12	QMMF Racing Team	16	0	0	0	0	0	NC	–
2013	Moto2	Speed Up SF13	QMMF Racing Team	17	0	0	0	0	19	21st	–
2014	Moto2	Speed Up SF14	QMMF Racing Team	18	1	1	0	0	72	12th	–
2015	Moto2	Speed Up SF15	QMMF Racing Team	13	0	0	0	0	30	22nd	–
2015	MotoGP	Honda RC213V-RS	AB Motoracing	3	0	0	0	0	0	NC	–
2016	Moto2	Suter MMX2	Montáže Brož Racing Team	1	0	0	0	0	6	27th	–
Total				**238**	**2**	**6**	**0**	**1**	**907**		**0**

==== By class ====
Class	Seasons	1st GP	1st Pod	1st Win	Race	Win	Podiums	Pole	FLap	Pts	WChmp
125cc	1998	1998 Australia			1	0	0	0	0	0	0
250cc	1999–2000, 2003–2007	1999 Malaysia	2003 Catalunya	2003 Netherlands	92	1	5	0	1	578	0
500cc	2001	2001 South Africa			14	0	0	0	0	27	0
MotoGP	2007–2008, 2015	2007 Great Britain			32	0	0	0	0	109	0
Moto2	2010–2016	2010 Qatar	2014 Netherlands	2014 Netherlands	99	1	1	0	0	193	0
Total	1998–2001, 2003–2008, 2010–2016				**238**	**2**	**6**	**0**	**1**	**907**	**0**

==== Races by year ====
(key) (Races in bold indicate pole position, races in italics indicate fastest lap)

Year	Class	Bike	1	2	3	4	5	6	7	8	9	10	11	12	13	14	15	16	17	18	Pos	Pts
1998	125cc	Honda	JPN	MAL	SPA	ITA	FRA	MAD	NED	GBR	GER	CZE	IMO	CAT	AUS; Ret	ARG					NC	0
1999	250cc	Honda	MAL; 14	JPN; 10	SPA; 17	FRA; 9	ITA; Ret	CAT; Ret	NED; 10	GBR; 11	GER; 6	CZE; 15	IMO; 15	VAL; 9	AUS; 10	RSA; 9	RIO; Ret	ARG; 8			12th	66
2000	250cc	Honda	RSA; 5	MAL; 6	JPN; 6	SPA; 5	FRA; 5	ITA; 7	CAT; 9	NED; 4	GBR; Ret	GER; 10	CZE; 10	POR; 4	VAL; 7	RIO; 5	PAC; 6	AUS; 7			6th	146
2001	500cc	Honda	JPN	RSA; 14	SPA; 15	FRA; DNS	ITA; Ret	CAT; Ret	NED; 15	GBR; 14	GER; 15	CZE; Ret	POR; 12	VAL; 13	PAC; 14	AUS; 12	MAL; 12	RIO; 13			18th	27
2003	250cc	Aprilia	JPN; Ret	RSA; 6	SPA; 5	FRA; 7	ITA; 9	CAT; 3	NED; 1	GBR; 3	GER; 6	CZE; Ret	POR; 10	RIO; 8	PAC; Ret	MAL; 9	AUS; 2	VAL; Ret			7th	145
2004	250cc	Aprilia	RSA; 16	SPA; 4	FRA; 6	ITA; 10	CAT; 9	NED; 6	RIO; Ret	GER; 7	GBR; 6	CZE; 4	POR; 6	JPN; Ret	QAT; Ret	MAL; Ret	AUS; DNS	VAL			11th	88
2005	250cc	Aprilia	SPA	POR	CHN	FRA; 18	ITA	CAT													17th	30
2005	250cc	Honda							NED; Ret												17th	30
2005	250cc	KTM								GBR; 2	GER; 10	CZE; 12	JPN; Ret	MAL; Ret	QAT; DNS	AUS	TUR	VAL			17th	30
2006	250cc	Aprilia	SPA; Ret	QAT; Ret	TUR; 9	CHN; 9	FRA; 11	ITA; 8	CAT; 9	NED; 8	GBR; 9	GER; 7	CZE; Ret	MAL; 15	AUS; 9	JPN; 11	POR; 9	VAL; 19			11th	78
2007	250cc	Aprilia	QAT; 13	SPA; 9	CHN; Ret	TUR; 13	FRA; 10	ITA; 10	CAT; 21												19th	25
2007	MotoGP	Kawasaki								GBR; 11	NED; 9	GER; 8	USA; 7	CZE; 12	RSM; 8	POR; 12	JPN; 7	AUS; 12	MAL; 15	VAL; 16	15th	59
2008	MotoGP	Kawasaki	QAT; 16	SPA; 13	POR; 16	CHN; 17	FRA; 14	ITA; 15	CAT; 12	GBR; 10	NED; Ret	GER; 10	USA; 17	CZE; 5	RSM; 13	INP; 11	JPN; 15	AUS; 12	MAL; 12	VAL; 17	18th	50
2010	Moto2	MZ-RE Honda	QAT; Ret	SPA; 15	FRA; 26	ITA; 27	GBR; 17	NED; Ret	CAT; 9	GER; 13	CZE; 18	INP; 10	RSM; 17	ARA; 21	JPN; 23	MAL; 24	AUS; 21	POR; 7	VAL; 27		23rd	26
2011	Moto2	MZ-RE Honda	QAT; Ret	SPA; 11	POR; 27	FRA; 25	CAT; 22	GBR; Ret	NED; 4	ITA; 21	GER; 23	CZE; 29	INP; 26	RSM; 27	ARA; 11	JPN; 12	AUS; Ret	MAL; Ret	VAL; 4		22nd	40
2012	Moto2	Moriwaki	QAT; 25	SPA; 16	POR; 17	FRA; DSQ	CAT; DSQ	GBR; DSQ	NED; DSQ	GER; DSQ											NC	0
2012	Moto2	Speed Up									ITA; DSQ	IND; DSQ	CZE; DSQ	RSM; DSQ	ARA; DSQ	JPN; DSQ	MAL; DSQ	AUS; DSQ	VAL		NC	0
2013	Moto2	Speed Up	QAT; DSQ	AME; DSQ	SPA; DSQ	FRA; DSQ	ITA; DSQ	CAT; DSQ	NED; DSQ	GER; DSQ	IND; DSQ	CZE; DSQ	GBR; DSQ	RSM; DSQ	ARA; DSQ	MAL; DSQ	AUS; 10	JPN; 11	VAL; 8		21st	19
2014	Moto2	Speed Up	QAT; 9	AME; 7	ARG; 12	SPA; 11	FRA; 14	ITA; 18	CAT; 10	NED; 1	GER; 17	INP; 9	CZE; 22	GBR; 22	RSM; 17	ARA; Ret	JPN; Ret	AUS; 22	MAL; 18	VAL; 9	12th	72
2015	Moto2	Speed Up	QAT; Ret	AME; 7	ARG; 14	SPA; 15	FRA; 11	ITA; 19	CAT; 22	NED; Ret	GER; Ret	INP; 13	CZE; 21	GBR; 7	RSM; 15	ARA	JPN				22nd	30
2015	MotoGP	Honda																AUS; 23	MAL; 20	VAL; 22	NC	0
2016	Moto2	Suter	QAT	ARG	AME	SPA	FRA	ITA	CAT	NED	GER	AUT	CZE; 10	GBR	RSM	ARA	JPN	AUS	MAL	VAL	27th	6

=== Supersport World Championship ===
==== Races by year ====
(key) (Races in bold indicate pole position, races in italics indicate fastest lap)

Year	Bike	1	2	3	4	5	6	7	8	9	10	11	12	13	14	Pos	Pts
2004	Honda	SPA	AUS	SMR	ITA	GER	GBR	EUR; 9	NED	ITA	FRA					32nd	7
2007	Yamaha	QAT	AUS	EUR	SPA	NED	ITA; 3	GBR; 1	SMR; 1	CZE	GBR	GER	ITA	FRA		9th	66
2009	Honda	AUS; 3	QAT; 9	SPA; 2	NED; 7	ITA; Ret	RSA; 8	USA; 10	SMR; 7	GBR; Ret	CZE; 2	GER; 15	ITA; 8	FRA; 4	POR	7th	117
2016	Yamaha	AUS; 3	THA	SPA	NED; DNS	ITA	MAL	GBR	ITA	ITA	GER	FRA	SPA	QAT		23rd	16
2017	Yamaha	AUS; 3	THA	SPA; DNS	NED; 14	ITA; 11	GBR; 7	ITA; 10	GER; 8	POR	FRA					8th	73
2017	Kawasaki											SPA; 3	QAT; 5			8th	73
2018	Kawasaki	AUS; Ret	THA; 6	SPA; 9	NED; DNS	ITA; 6	GBR; 11	CZE; 7	ITA; 6	POR	FRA	ARG	QAT			10th	51

=== Superbike World Championship ===
==== Races by year ====
(key) (Races in bold indicate pole position, races in italics indicate fastest lap)

Year	Bike	1		2		3		4		5		6		7		8		9		10		11		12		13		Pos	Pts
Year	Bike	R1	R2	R1	R2	R1	R2	R1	R2	R1	R2	R1	R2	R1	R2	R1	R2	R1	R2	R1	R2	R1	R2	R1	R2	R1	R2	Pos	Pts
2016	Kawasaki	AUS	AUS	THA	THA	SPA	SPA	NED	NED	ITA	ITA	MAL; 9	MAL; 5	GBR; 10	GBR; 12	ITA; 10	ITA; 11	USA; 12	USA; 9	GER; 11	GER; Ret	FRA	FRA	SPA; 14	SPA; 9	QAT	QAT	17th	64
2017	Kawasaki	AUS	AUS	THA	THA	SPA	SPA	NED	NED	ITA	ITA	GBR	GBR	ITA	ITA	USA	USA	GER	GER	POR; 13	POR; 8	FRA; 18	FRA; 14	SPA	SPA	QAT	QAT	27th	13
